= List of songs recorded by Jubin Nautiyal =

Jubin Nautiyal Songs

Jubin Nautiyal is an Indian playback singer. He made his debut in Hindi films with the song "Ek Mulaqat" from Sonali Cable (2014). He mostly sings in Hindi and has also sang in other Indian languages such as Telugu, Bengali, Odia, Tamil, English, Gujarati, Kannada, Sanskrit and Punjabi.

== Film songs ==
=== Hindi ===
Year	Film	Song	Music	Lyrics	Co-singer(s)
2014	Sonali Cable	"Ek Mulaqat"	Amjad–Nadeem	Sameer	
2014	The Shaukeens	"Meherbaani"	Arko		
2015	Sharafat Gayi Tel Lene	"Dil Ka Funda"	Sandeep Chatterjee	Tejpal Singh Rawat	Talia Bentson
2015	Barkhaa	"Tu Itni Khoobsurat Hai" (Reloaded)	Amjad–Nadeem	Shadab Akhtar	Prakriti Kakar
2015	Kuch Kuch Locha Hai	"Na Jaane Kya Hai Tumse Waasta"	Amjad–Nadeem	Sanjeev Chaturvedi	Asees Kaur
2015	Kuch Kuch Locha Hai	"Ishq Da Maara"	Amjad–Nadeem	Amjad–Nadeem	
2015	Bajrangi Bhaijaan	"Zindagi Kuch Toh Bata"	Pritam	Neelesh Misra	
2015	Kis Kisko Pyaar Karoon	"Samandar"	Tanishk Bagchi	Arafat Mehmood	Shreya Ghoshal
2015	Jazbaa	"Bandeyaa"	Amjad–Nadeem	Amjad–Nadeem, Sanjay Gupta	
2016	Fitoor	"Tere Liye"	Amit Trivedi	Swanand Kirkire	Sunidhi Chauhan
2016	7 Hours to Go	"Zinda Hota Mein"	Sugat–Shubham	Shraddha Bhilave	
2016	Ishq Forever	"Ishq Forever"	Nadeem Saifi	Sameer	Palak Muchhal
2016	1920 London	"Gumnaam Hai Koi"	Kaushik-Akash for JAM8	Kunaal Vermaa	Antara Mitra
2016	A Scandall	"Labon Se"	Amjad–Nadeem	Sameer	Shivranjani Singh
2016	Raaz: Reboot	"Yaad Hai Na" (Sufi Version)	Jeet Gannguli	Kausar Munir	
2016	Raaz: Reboot	"The Sound Of Raaz"	Jeet Gannguli	Rashmi Virag	
2016	One Night Stand	"Le Chala"	Jeet Gannguli	Manoj Muntashir	
2016	Rustom	"Dhal Jaun Main"	Jeet Gannguli	Manoj Muntashir	Akankshka Sharma
2017	Ok Jaanu	"The Humma Song"	A. R. Rahman, Tanishk Bagchi, Badshah	Mehboob, Badshah (rap lyrics)	Shashaa Tirupati, Tanishk Bagchi, Badshah (rap)
2017	Commando 2: The Black Money Trail	"Seedha Saadha"	Mannan Shaah	Kumaar	
2017	Running Shaadi	"Faraar"	Keegan Pinto		
2017	Running Shaadi	"Kuch To Hai"	Anjana Ankur Singh & Sandeep Madhavan	Anas Ali Khan	
2017	Kaabil	"Kaabil Hoon"	Rajesh Roshan	Nasir Faraaz	Palak Muchhal
2017	Kaabil	"Kaabil Hoon" (Sad Version)	Rajesh Roshan	Nasir Faraaz	
2017	Kaabil	"Kuch Din"	Rajesh Roshan	Manoj Muntashir	
2017	Kaabil	"Kisi Se Pyar Ho Jaye"	Rajesh Roshan	Kumaar, Anand Bakshi	
2017	Jolly LLB 2	"Bawara Mann"	Chirrantan Bhatt	Junaid Wasi	Neeti Mohan
2017	Raabta	"Ik Vaari Aa"	Pritam	Amitabh Bhattacharya	
2017	Tubelight	"Tinka Tinka Dil Mera"	Pritam	Kausar Munir	
2017	Dil Jo Na Keh Saka	"Tanha Tanha"	Shail–Pritesh	A. M. Turaz	Aditi Paul
2017	Kuchh Bheege Alfaaz	"Pehla Nasha"	Jatin–Lalit (recreated by Anshuman Mukherjee)	Majrooh Sultanpuri	Palak Muchhal
2017	Machine	"Tera Junoon"	Tanishk Bagchi	Arafat Mehmood	
2017	Baadshaho	"Socha Hai"	R. D. Burman, Tanishk Bagchi	Manoj Muntashir, Sahir Ludhianvi	Neeti Mohan, Kishore Kumar, Asha Bhosle
2017	Baadshaho	"Socha Hai" (2nd Version)	R. D. Burman, Tanishk Bagchi	Manoj Muntashir, Sahir Ludhianvi	Neeti Mohan
2017	Baadshaho	"Socha Hai" (Love Version)	R. D. Burman, Abhijit Vaghani	Manoj Muntashir, Sahir Ludhianvi	Neeti Mohan
2017	Ittefaq	"Ittefaq Se"	Tanishk Bagchi (original by Bappi Lahiri)	Tanishk Bagchi, Groot, Anjaan	Nikhita Gandhi
2018	Dil Juunglee	"Gazab Ka Hai Din"	Tanishk Bagchi (original by Anand–Milind)	Tanishk Bagchi, Arafat Mehmood	Prakriti Kakar
2018	Hate Story 4	"Boond Boond"	Arko Pravo Mukherjee	Manoj Muntashir	Neeti Mohan
2018	Hate Story 4	"Tum Mere Ho"	Mithoon	Manoj Muntashir	Amrita Singh
2018	Baaghi 2	"Lo Safar"	Mithoon	Sayeed Quadri	
2018	Phamous	"Dil Beparwah"	Sundeep Gosswami & Surya Vishwakarma	Naveen Tyagi	Jonita Gandhi
2018	Genius	"Holi Biraj Ma"	Himesh Reshammiya	Manoj Muntashir	
2018	Mitron	"Sawarne Lage"	Tanishk Bagchi	Tanishk Bagchi	
2018	Loveyatri	"Akh Lad Jaave"	Tanishk Bagchi	Tanishk Bagchi, Badshah (rap lyrics)	Asees Kaur, Badshah (rap)
2018	Jalebi	"Tum Se"	Samuel–Akanksha	Manoj Kumarnath	
2018	Jalebi	"Tum Se Adlib"	Samuel–Akanksha	Manoj Kumarnath	
2018	The Dark Side of Life: Mumbai City	"Aawargi"	Sabir Khan	Azeem Shirazi	
2019	Why Cheat India	"Phir Mulaaqat"	Kunaal–Rangon	Kunaal Vermaa	
2019	Kabir Singh	"Tujhe Kitna Chahein Aur"	Mithoon		
2019	Amavas	"Finito"	Abhijit Vaghani	Kunaal Vermaa, Ikka	Sukriti Kakar, Ikka
2019	Amavas	"Dhadkan"	Sanjeev–Darshan	Sandeep Nath	Palak Muchhal
2019	Junglee	"Fakeera Ghar Aaja"	Sameer Uddin	Anvita Dutt	
2019	India's Most Wanted	"Matvaare"	Amit Trivedi	Amitabh Bhattacharya	Sanah Moidutty
2019	Code Blue	"Kaash Tu Mila Hota"	Shadab Azmi	Arafat Mehmood	
2019	Hume Tumse Pyaar Kitna	"Baarish"	Raaj Aashoo	Shabbir Ahmed	Priyani Vani
2019	Cypher	"Aagaz"	Bharat Kamal	Sagar Pathak	Dhvani Bhanushali
2019	SP Chauhan	"Bulandiyaan"	Vibhas	Abhendra Kumar Udhapay	Vipin Aneja
2019	Khandaani Shafakhana	"Dil Jaaniye"	Payal Dev	Shabbir Ahmed	Tulsi Kumar
2019	Bala	"Pyaar Toh Tha"	Sachin–Jigar	Priya Saraiya	Asees Kaur
2019	Bypass Road	"So Gaya Yeh Jahan"	Raaj Ashoo	Shabbir Ahmed	Nitin Mukesh, Saloni Thakkar
2019	Marjaavaan	"Tum Hi Aana"	Payal Dev	Kunaal Vermaa	
2019	Marjaavaan	"Tum Hi Aana" (Sad Version)	Payal Dev	Kunaal Vermaa	
2019	Marjaavaan	"Tum Hi Aana" (Happy Version)	Payal Dev	Kunaal Vermaa	
2019	Marjaavaan	"Tum Hi Aana" (Duet Version)	Payal Dev	Kunaal Vermaa	Dhvani Bhanushali
2019	Marjaavaan	"Kinna Sona"	Meet Bros	Kumaar	Dhvani Bhanushali
2019	Marjaavaan	"Haiya Ho"	Tanishk Bagchi	Tanishk Bagchi	Tulsi Kumar
2019	Pagalpanti	"Bimar Dil"	Tanishk Bagchi	Shabbir Ahmed	Asees Kaur
2019	LuvUTurn	"Khuda Raazi"	Prem Anand	Sunil Sirvaiya	Akankshka Sharma
2019	The Body	"Main Janta Hoon"	Shamir Tandon	Sameer	
2019	Music Teacher	"Sambhaal Rakhiyan"	Rochak Kohli	Gurpreet Saini	
2019	Dabangg 3	"Habibi Ke Nain"	Sajid–Wajid	Irfan Kamal	Shreya Ghoshal
2020	Street Dancer 3D	"Bezuban Kab Se"	Sachin–Jigar	Jigar Saraiya	Siddharth Basrur, Sachin–Jigar
2020	Happy Hardy and Heer	"Ishqbaaziyaan"	Himesh Reshammiya	Shabbir Ahmed	Harshdeep Kaur, Asees Kaur, Alamgir Khan
2020	Love Aaj Kal	"Shayad" (Film Version)	Pritam	Irshad Kamil	
2020	Sadak 2	"Shukriya"	Jeet Gannguli	Rashmi Virag	KK
2020	Sadak 2	"Shukriya" (Reprise)	Jeet Gannguli	Rashmi Virag	KK
2020	Sadak 2	"Shukriya" (Rendition)	Jeet Gannguli	Rashmi Virag	KK, Arijit Singh
2020	Ginny Weds Sunny	"Phir Chala"	Payal Dev	Kunaal Vermaa	
2020	Unpaused	"Ummeed Hai"	Payal Dev	Kunaal Vermaa	
2020	Ludo	"Meri Tum Ho"	Pritam	Sandeep Shrivastava, Shloke Lal	Ash King
2020	Ludo	"Meri Tum Ho" (Unplugged)	Pritam	Sandeep Shrivastava, Shloke Lal	Ash King
2020	Namumkin Tere Bin Jeena	"Ghumsum Chandni Ho"	Monty Sharma	Sunil Sirvaiya	
2021	Roohi	"Kiston"	Sachin–Jigar	Amitabh Bhattacharya	Sachin–Jigar
2021	Koi Jaane Na	"Ishq Karo Dil Se"	Amaal Mallik	Kumaar	
2021	Shershaah	"Raataan Lambiyan"	Tanishk Bagchi		Asees Kaur
2021	Bhuj: The Pride of India	"Hanjugam"	Gourov Dasgupta	Devshi Khanduri	
2021	Kya Meri Sonam Gupta Bewafa Hai?	"Kuch Paas Mere"	Rahul Mishra	Manoj Muntashir	
2021	Sanak	"Suna Hai"	Jeet Gannguli	Rashmi Virag	
2021	Chandigarh Kare Aashiqui	"Maafi - Vibe Mix"	Sachin–Jigar	Priya Saraiya	
2021	Hum Do Hamare Do	"Kamli"	Sachin–Jigar	Shellee	Divya Kumar, Sachin–Jigar
2021	Satyameva Jayate 2	"Meri Zindagi Hai Tu"	Rochak Kohli	Manoj Muntashir	Neeti Mohan
2021	Antim: The Final Truth	"Hone Laga"	Ravi Basrur	Shabbir Ahmed	
2021	Bekhudi	"Meherwan"	Rahul Nair	Rajesh Dheeraj	
2021	Tadap	"Tu Mera Hogaya Hai"	Pritam	Irshad Kamil	
2022	Before You Die	"Hum Tere Ho Gaye"	Bob SN	Budhaditya Mukherjee	
2022	Radhe Shyam	"Udd Jaa Parindey"	Mithoon		
2022	Attack	"Ik Tu Hai"	Shashwat Sachdev	Kumaar	Shashwat Sachdev
2022	Attack	"Phir Se Zara"	Shashwat Sachdev	Kumaar	Shashwat Sachdev
2022	Jungle Cry	"Hero"	Palash Muchhal	Palash Mucchal, Shailendra	
2022	Vikram	"Ek Sher Ho Tum"	Anirudh Ravichander	Raqueeb Alam	
2022	Dear Dia	"Mann Uda Uda Jaye"	Mahesh Matkar, Rakesh Kharvi	Rakesh Kharvi, Amit Sagar	
2022	Ittu Si Baat	"Darbadar"	Vishal Mishra	Raj Shekhar	
2022	HIT: The First Case	"Tinka"	Manan Bhardwaj		
2022	Khuda Haafiz 2	"Chaiyaan Mein Saiyaan Ki"	Mithoon		Asees Kaur, Keshav Anand
2022	Good Luck Jerry	"Paracetamol"	Parag Chhabra	Raj Shekhar	Parag Chhabra, Soom T, Shehnaz Akhtar, Sahil Akhtar
2022	Tara vs Bilal	"Sau Rab Di"	Manan Bhardwaj		Manan Bhardwaj, Purvashi Grover
2022	Prem Geet 3	"Koi Na Koi Naata Hai"	Pawandeep Rajan	Ruby Fulara, Subhash Kale	
2022	Middle Class Love	"Naya Pyaar Naya Ehsaas"	Himesh Reshammiya		Palak Muchhal
2022	Dhokha: Round D Corner	"Tu Banke Hawa"	Gourov Dasgupta	Devshi Khanduri	
2022	Thank God	"Manike"	Tanishk Bagchi, Chamath Sangeeth	Rashmi Virag, Dulan ARX, Mellow D	Yohani, Surya Ragunnathan
2022	Thank God	"Haaniya Ve"	Tanishk Bagchi	Rashmi Virag	
2022	Nazar Andaaz	"Aadhi Kahani"	Vishal Mishra	Raj Shekhar	
2022	Drishyam 2	"Saath Hum Rahein"	Devi Sri Prasad	Amitabh Bhattacharya	
2022	Salaam Venky	"Yu Tere Hue Hum"	Mithoon		Palak Muchhal
2022	Govinda Naam Mera	"Bana Sharabi"	Tanishk Bagchi	Tanishk Bagchi	
2023	Mission Majnu	"Rabba Janda"	Tanishk Bagchi	Shabbir Ahmed	
2023	Tu Jhoothi Main Makkaar	"Jaadui"	Pritam	Amitabh Bhattacharya	
2023	Gumraah	"Allah De Bande"	Mithoon		Aaman Trikha, Mithoon
2023	8 A.M. Metro	"Ghoomey"	Mark K Robin	Manoj Juloori	
2023	Kushi	"Aradhya"	Hesham Abdul Wahab	Raqueeb Alam	Palak Muchhal
2023	Dream Girl 2	"Dil Ka Telephone 2.0"	Meet Bros	Kumaar	Meet Bros, Jonita Gandhi
2023	Dream Girl 2	"Piya"	Arko		
2023	Yaariyan 2	"Bewafaa Tu"	Manan Bhardwaj	Manan Bhardwaj, Rahim Shah, Shamsul Hasan Shams	
2023	Gadar 2	"Udd Jaa Kaale Kaava" (Climax Version)	Uttam Singh, Mithoon	Anand Bakshi	Udit Narayan
2023	Ab Dilli Dur Nahin	"Mehsoos Hua"	Ajay Singha		
2023	The Destiny Kalchakra	"Jeena Bhi Kya Jeena"	Prosenjit Mahapatra	Prosenjit Mahapatra, Viral	
2023	Love All	"Baton Baton Mein"	Saurabh Vaibhav	Ankit Pandey	
2023	Pippa	"Jazbaat"	A. R. Rahman	Shellee	Shilpa Rao
2023	Mein Atal Hoon	"Desh Pehle"	Payal Dev	Manoj Muntashir	
2024	Article 370	"Dua"	Shashwat Sachdev	Kumaar	Priyanshi Naidu, Shashwat Sachdev
2024	Shaitaan	"Khushiyaan Bator Lo"	Amit Trivedi	Kumaar	
2024	Love Sex Aur Dhokha 2	"Gulabi Ankhiyan"	Meet Bros	Kumaar	Sakshi Holkar, Piyush Mehroliyaa, Meet Bros
2024	Srikanth	"Tu Mil Gaya"	Tanishk Bagchi	Shloke Lal	Tulsi Kumar
2024	Mr. & Mrs. Mahi	"Agar Ho Tum"	Tanishk Bagchi	Kausar Munir	
2024	Savi	"Paas Tere Main"	Javed–Mohsin	Rashmi Virag	Shreya Ghoshal
2024	Dedh Bigha Zameen	"Musafir"	Arko		
2024	Aho Vikramaarka	"Maa"	Arko		
2024	Ishq Vishk Rebound	"Rehmat"	Rochak Kohli	Gurpreet Saini, Gautam G Sharma	
2024	Bad Newz	"Rabb Warga"	Abhijeet Srivastava	Shayra Apoorva	
2024	Bad Newz	"Haule Haule"	Rochak Kohli	Gurpreet Saini, Gautam G Sharma	
2024	Auron Mein Kahan Dum Tha	"Jahan Se Chale The"	M. M. Keeravani	Manoj Muntashir	Sunidhi Chauhan
2024	Auron Mein Kahan Dum Tha	"Dobara Humein Kya"	M. M. Keeravani	Manoj Muntashir	Sunidhi Chauhan
2024	Ulajh	"Shaukan"	Shashwat Sachdev	Kumaar	Neha Kakkar, Shashwat Sachdev
2024	Ulajh	"Thoda Galat"	Shashwat Sachdev	Kumaar	Shashwat Sachdev
2024	Ghudchadi	"Rote Rote"	Tanishk Bagchi	Kumaar	
2024	Bandaa Singh Chaudhary	"Enna Sona"	Rahul Jain	Jax53	Rahul Jain
2024	Sikandar Ka Muqaddar	"Thehre Rahen"	Payal Dev	Manoj Muntashir	
2025	Fateh	"Roohdaari"	Vivek Hariharan	Mandeep Khurana	Vivek Hariharan
2025	Loveyapa	"Rehna Kol"	Tanishk Bagchi	Gurpreet Saini, MellowD (rap lyrics)	Zahrah S. Khan, MellowD (rap)
2025	Mere Husband Ki Biwi	"Channa Tu Bemisal"	Tanishk Bagchi	Mudassar Aziz	Bhoomi Trivedi
2025	Kesari Chapter 2	"Parwardigara"	Shashwat Sachdev	Irshad Kamil	Ajoy Chakrabarty, Garvit Soni
2025	Kesari Chapter 2	"Parwardigara" (Sufi Version)	Shashwat Sachdev	Irshad Kamil	Ajoy Chakrabarty, Garvit Soni
2025	Ground Zero	"So Lene De"	Tanishk Bagchi	Vayu	Afsana Khan
2025	Raid 2	"Tumhe Dillagi"	Rochak Kohli	Manoj Muntashir	
2025	Bhool Chuk Maaf	"Ganga Kinare"	Tanishk Bagchi	Irshad Kamil	
2025	Kaalidhar Laapata	"Haseen Pareshaaniyaan"	Amit Trivedi	Geet Sagar	Shahid Mallya, Deepali Sathe
2025	Aankhon Ki Gustaakhiyan	"Aankhon Ki Gustaakhiyan (Title Track)"	Vishal Mishra	Vishal Mishra, Kaushal Kishore	
2025	Aankhon Ki Gustaakhiyan	"Yuhi Safar"	Vishal Mishra	Vishal Mishra	
2025	Saiyaara	"Barbaad"	The Rish (Rishab Kant)		
2025	Saiyaara	"Go Follow Your Dream"	The Rish (Rishab Kant)	The Rish, John Stewart Eduri	
2025	Dhadak 2	"Bas Ek Dhadak"	Javed–Mohsin	Rashmi Virag	Shreya Ghoshal
2025	Dhadak 2	"Bawaria"	Tanishk Bagchi	Oziz Dalal	Suvarna Tiwari
2025	Jaan Abhi Baaki Hai	"Phir Na Kabhi"	Mahesh Matkar	I J Mishra, Satyajeet	
2025	Son of Sardaar 2	"Nazar Battu"	Harsh Upadhyay, Jay Mavani	Pranav Vatsa	
2025	War 2	"Jeete Jeete"	Pritam	Amitabh Bhattacharya	
2025	Love in Vietnam	"Chahe Jo Ho"	Aamir Ali	Rahhat Shah Kazmi	
2025	Maa	"Humnava"	Rocky-Shiv	Manoj Muntashir	Shreya Ghoshal
2025	Ek Deewane Ki Deewaniyat	"Khoobsurat"	Kunaal Vermaa		
2025	Kis Kisko Pyaar Karoon 2	"Ranjhe Nu Heer"	DigV	Lavraj	
2025	Tu Meri Main Tera Main Tera Tu Meri	"Mudh Ja Raahiye"	Vishal-Shekhar	Anvita Dutt	
2026	Do Deewane Seher Mein	"Aasma Aasma"	Hesham Abdul Wahab	Abhiruchi Chand	Neeti Mohan
2026	Dhurandhar: The Revenge	"Aakhri Ishq"	Shashwat Sachdev	Irshad Kamil	
2026	Dhurandhar: The Revenge	"Kanhaiyaa"	Shashwat Sachdev	Nawab Sadiq Jung Bahadur ‘Hilm’	
2026	Haunted 3D: Echoes of the Past	"Dard"	Nayeem-Shabir	Shakeel Aazmi	
2026	Tera Yaar Hoon Main	"Tum Hi Se Pyaar"	Payal Dev, Aditya Dev	Kunaal Vermaa	
2026	Awarapan 2	"Laado"	Jeet Gannguli	Rashmi Virag	
2026	The Vvaan: Force of the Forrest	"Samjho Na"	Tanishk Bagchi	Manoj Muntashir	Suvarna Tiwari
2026	Pehla Pyaar Doosri Baar	"Pyaar Manga Hai Tumhi Se"	Rochak Kohli	Raj Shekhar	
2026	Prem Keetanu	"Haan Umr Bhar Ko"	Annkur R Pathakk	Sachin Urmtosh	
2026	Ramayana: Part 1	"Ram Raja Bhi Hain Aur Tapasvi Bhi Hain"	Dr. Kumar Vishwas		
2026	Parivarik ManuRanjan	"Yaad Tu Aaya"	Anuj Garg	Yash Kapoor, Anuj Garg	Aseem Trivedi

=== Bengali ===
Year	Film	Song	Music	Lyrics	Co-singer(s)
2015	Aashiqui	"Tor Aashiqui"	Savvy Gupta	Prasen (Prasenjit Mukherjee)	
2017	Rangbaaz	"Ghum Amar"	Savvy Gupta	Prasen (Prasenjit Mukherjee)	Prashmita Paul
2017	Dekh Kemon Lage	"Let's Dance Kolkata"	Jeet Gannguli	Raja Chanda	Palak Muchhal
2018	Jamai Badal	"Toke Chara"	Jeet Gannguli	Ritam Sen	
2018	Jamai Badal	"Mon"	Jeet Gannguli	Ritam Sen	Neha Karode
2018	Girlfriend	"Bin Tere Sanam"	Jeet Gannguli	Raja Chanda	
2019	Kidnap	"Ami Tomake Bhalobashi"	Jeet Gannguli	Raja Chanda	Parry Gripp (rap)
2019	Jaanbaaz	"Tui Je Amar"	Dev Sen	Rivo	Antara Mitra
2020	Tumi Ashbe Bole	"Ki Kore Bhule Thakbo Toke"	Jeet Gannguli	Priyo Chattopadhyay	
2021	Baazi	"Tor Bhul Bhangabo Ki Kore Bol"	Jeet Gannguli	Pranjol	
2022	Toke Chhara Banchbo Na	"Dine Dine Tui"	Jeet Gannguli	Prasen (Prasenjit Mukherjee)	
2022	Jotugriho	"Barse Re"	Dabbu, Loy-Deep	Loy-Deep	
2025	Antaratma	"Antaratma" (Title Track)	Indraadip Dasgupta	Robiul Islam Jibon	

=== Telugu ===
Year	Film	Song	Music	Lyrics	Co-singer(s)
2016	Sarrainodu	"Telusa Telusa"	S. Thaman	Sri Mani	Sameera Bharadwaj
2016	Ism	"Kanulu Naavaina"	Anup Rubens	Bhaskarabhatla Ravi Kumar	Mohana Bhogaraju
2018	Gayatri	"Oka Nuvvu Oka Nenu"	S. Thaman	Ramajogayya Sastry	Shreya Ghoshal
2018	Lover	"Adbhutham"	Tanishk Bagchi	Sri Mani	Ranjini Jose
2019	Dabangg 3	"Gulabi"	Sajid–Wajid	Ramajogayya Sastry	Shreya Ghoshal
2020	Street Dancer 3D	"Mounamaa"	Sachin–Jigar	Ramajogayya Sastry	Aditya Iyengar, Siddharth Basrur, Sachin-Jigar
2026	Lenin	"VaareVaa VaareVaa"	S. Thaman	Anantha Sriram	Shwetha Mohan

=== Kannada ===
Year	Film	Song	Music	Lyrics	Co-singer(s)
2017	Mass Leader	"Deepave Ninna"	Veer Samarth	V. Nagendra Prasad	Aishwarya Rangarajan
2019	Dabangg 3	Thabbibaadene	Sajid–Wajid	Anup Bhandari	Shreya Ghoshal

=== Tamil ===
Year	Film	Song	Music	Lyrics	Co-singer(s)
2019	Dabangg 3	"Orey Sontham"	Sajid–Wajid	Pa. Vijay	Shreya Ghoshal
2020	Street Dancer 3D	"Oomaiyaai Nirkiren"	Sachin–Jigar	Veeramani Kannan, Tony J Madras Macha (rap lyrics)	Aditya Iyengar, Siddharth Basrur, Sachin-Jigar

=== Gujarati ===
Year	Film	Song	Music	Lyrics	Co-singer(s)
2025	Kaashi Raaghav	"Maa Ganga"	Vatsal–Kavan	Jatan Pandya	

=== English ===
Year	Film	Song	Music	Lyrics	Co-singer(s)
2021	Initiation	"Breaking The Rules"	Rocky–Jubin	ShivM	

== Non-film songs ==
=== Television ===
Year	Show	Song	Music	Lyrics	Co-singer(s)
2015	Pyaar Tune Kya Kiya	"Pyaar Tune Kya Kiya"	Amjad–Nadeem	Amjad–Nadeem, Sanjeev Chaturvedi	

=== Web series ===
Year	Show	Song	Music	Lyrics	Co-singer(s)
2020	The Forgotten Army – Azaadi Ke Liye	"Ae Dil Bata"	Pritam	Kausar Munir	Antara Mitra
2020	JL50	"Main Hi Hoon"	Aseem Trivedi		
2024	Call Me Bae	"Khwaish Poori"	Rochak Kohli	Gurpreet Saini	Rochak Kohli
2025	The Royals	"Tu Tu Hai Wahi"	R. D. Burman, RUUH, JOH	Gulshan Bawra	Asha Bhosle, Jonita Gandhi, RUUH, JOH
2025	The Royals	"Ecstasy"	RUUH, JOH	RUUH, JOH, Smriti Bhoker	Jonita Gandhi
2025	The Ba***ds of Bollywood	"Ruseya"	Shashwat Sachdev	Jasmine Sandlas	

=== Albums ===
Year	Album	Song	Music	Lyrics	Co-singer(s)
2023	Tum Aaye Ho Toh	"Aisi Teri Yaadein"	Rocky - Jubin	Rocky Khanna	
2023	Tum Aaye Ho Toh	"Humko Tumse"	Rocky - Jubin	Rocky Khanna	
2023	Tum Aaye Ho Toh	"Udta Udta"	Rocky - Jubin	Rocky Khanna	
2023	Tum Aaye Ho Toh	"Tum Aaye Ho Toh"	Rocky - Jubin	Rocky Khanna	
2023	Tum Aaye Ho Toh	"Meri Sau"	Rocky - Jubin	Rocky Khanna	
2023	Tum Aaye Ho Toh	"Kahani Teri Meri"	Rocky - Jubin	Rocky Khanna	
2024	Azaad Collab	"Rangeeni"	Amit Trivedi	Amitabh Bhattacharya	Hansika Pareek
2025	Rangat	"Jyun"	Amit Saagar		

=== Singles ===
Year	Song	Music	Lyrics	Co-singer(s)
2015	"Teri Ek Hassi"	Palash Muchhal	Palak Muchhal	
2016	"Shikwa Nahi"	Amjad Nadeem		
2017	"Haaye Dil"	Rocky - Shiv	Sayeed Quadri	
2017	"Pehlo Prem"	Viraal		
2017	"Dil Buddhu"	Ashish-Vijay	Avinash Kumar	Pawni Pandey
2017	"Tu Hai Meri"	Shayadshah Shahebdin	Pratyush Prakash	
2017	"Dil Ka Haal"	Shayadshah Shahebdin	Pratyush Prakash	
2018	"Humnava Mere"	Rocky - Shiv	Manoj Muntashir	
2019	"Tujhe Paane Ko	Abhijit Vaghani	Manoj Muntashir	Neeti Mohan
2019	"Chitthi"	Khajan Dutt Sharma	Kumaar	
2019	"Ae Mere Des"	Joe Costa	Nikhil Khamkar	
2019	"Ghar Aaja"	Aditya Dev, Javed Bashir, Rocky - Shiv	Bulleh Shah Poetry, Manzoor Mian, Rocky Khanna	Juggy Sandhu
2019	"Ta Chuma"	Aditya Dev, Narendra Singh Negi	Narendra Singh Negi, Kunaal Verma	Tulsi Kumar
2019	"Ganesha"	Raaj Aashoo	Murali Agarwal	
2020	"Bewafa Tera Masoom Chehra"	Rochak Kohli	Rashmi Virag	
2020	"Taaron Ke Shehar"	Jaani		Neha Kakkar
2020	"Nayan"	Lijo George, Dj Chetas	Manoj Muntashir	Dhvani Bhanushali
2020	"Aatishbaazi"	Rocky-Jubin	Rocky Khanna	
2020	"Nashe Mein"	Viraal, Arya	Viraal	
2020	"Shri Krishna Govind Hare Murari"	Raaj Aashoo	Murali Agarwal	
2020	"Main Balak Tu Mata"	Manan Bhardwaj	Manoj Muntashir	
2020	"Om Jai Jagdish Hare"	Manan Bhardwaj	Traditional	Tulsi Kumar, Neha Kakkar, Dhvani Bhanushali, Parampara Thakur, Sachet Tandon, Guru Randhawa, Millind Gaba
2020	"Govind Bolo"	Raaj Aashoo	Pankaj Narayan	
2020	"Dil Chahte Ho"	Payal Dev	A. M. Turaz	
2020	"Meri Aashiqui"	Rochak Kohli	Rashmi Virag	
2021	"Lut Gaye"	Tanishk Bagchi	Manoj Muntashir	
2021	"Meri Jaan"	Shashwat Sachdev	Raj Shekhar	Shashwat Sachdev
2021	"Pehle Pyaar Ka Pehla Gham"	Manan Bhardwaj	Rashmi Virag	Tulsi Kumar
2021	"Rim Jhim"	Ami Mishra	Kunaal Vermaa	
2021	"Main Jis Din Bhulaa Du"	Rochak Kohli	Manoj Muntashir	Tulsi Kumar
2021	"Wafa Na Raas Aayee"	Meet Bros	Rashmi Virag	
2021	"Toh Aagaye Hum"	Mithoon	Sayeed Quadri	
2021	"Kabira"	Raaj Aashoo	Traditional	
2021	"Bewafa Tera Muskurana"	Meet Bros	Rashmi Virag	
2021	"Rabba Maine Chand Vekhya"	Tanishk Bagchi, Vayu	Vayu, Vibha Saraf	Vibha Saraf
2021	"Hare Krishna Hare Rama"	Shabbir Ahmed	Shabbir Ahmed, Ayaz Kohli	
2021	"Khushi Jab Bhi Teri"	Rochak Kohli	A. M. Turaz	
2021	"Tujhe Bhoolna Toh Chaaha"	Rochak Kohli	Manoj Muntashir	
2021	"Dil Galti Kar Baitha Hai"	Meet Bros, Shardul Rathod	Manoj Muntashir, Shardul Rathod	
2021	"Barsaat Ki Dhun"	Rochak Kohli	Rashmi Virag	
2021	"Dil Lauta Do"	Payal Dev	Kunaal Vermaa	Payal Dev
2022	"Mast Nazron Se"	Rochak Kohli	Manoj Muntashir	
2022	"Rishta Kya"	Md Irfan Ali, Rahul Sharma	Sahas Pareek	
2022	"Dil Jisse Zinda Hain"	Meet Bros	Youngveer	
2022	"Meri Tarah"	Payal Dev	Kunaal Vermaa	Payal Dev
2022	"Kachiyaan Kachiyaan"	Meet Bros	Kumaar	
2022	"O Aasman Wale"	Rochak Kohli	Manoj Muntashir	
2022	"Tumse Pyaar Karke"	Payal Dev	Kunaal Vermaa	Tulsi Kumar
2022	"Shish Nawata Hoon"	Payal Dev	Jubin Nautiyal	
2022	"Meri Maa Ke Barabar Koi Nahi"	Payal Dev	Manoj Muntashir	
2022	"Mere Ghar Ram Aaye Hain"	Payal Dev	Manoj Muntashir	
2022	"Kaun Kehte Hain Bhagwan Aate Nahi (Achyutam Keshavam)"	Payal Dev	Rashmi Virag	Tulsi Kumar
2022	"Meri Mai"	Payal Dev	Manoj Muntashir	
2022	"Mere Baba"	Payal Dev	Manoj Muntashir	
2022	"Mere Kanha"	Raaj Aashoo	Seepi Jha	Jaya Kishori
2022	"Meethi Meethi"	Payal Dev	Rashmi Virag	Payal Dev
2022	"Tu Saamne Aaye"	Rocky - Jubin	Rocky Khanna	Yohani
2022	"Barsaat Ho Jaaye"	Payal Dev	Rashmi Virag	Payal Dev
2022	"Kuch Baatein"	Payal Dev	Kunaal Vermaa	Payal Dev
2022	"Teri Galliyon Se"	Meet Bros	Rashmi Virag	
2023	"Pehli Baarish Mein"	Rochak Kohli	Gurpreet Saini, Gautam G Sharma	
2023	"Siya Ram"	Raaj Aashoo	Seepi Jha	Jaya Kishori
2023	"Mere Bhole Nath"	Payal Dev	Vishal Bagh	
2023	"Maa Ka Bulawa Aaya Hai"	Payal Dev	Manoj Muntashir	
2023	"Maai Hai Na"	Payal Dev	Manoj Muntashir	Payal Dev
2023	"Dotara"	Payal Dev	Vayu	Payal Dev
2023	"Mere Kanha Bhool Na Jaana"	Ashish Kulkarni	Manoj Muntashir	
2023	"Chaudhary"	Amit Trivedi	Shellee	Yohani, Mame Khan
2023	"Kali Kali Zulfon Ke"	Rochak Kohli	Gurpreet Saini	Rochak Kohli
2023	"Hariye Gelam Re"	Dipankar Ghosh		
2023	"Hai Kaisi Kaisi"	Rocky - Jubin	Rocky Khanna	
2023	"Mast Aankhein"	Rahat Fateh Ali Khan, T.B.	Rashmi Virag, Rahat Fateh Ali Khan	Tulsi Kumar
2024	"Hadh Se"	Rahul Mishra	Prince Dubey	
2024	"Piya"	Viraal		
2024	"Zor Ki Barsaat Hui"	Rochak Kohli	Gurpreet Saini	
2024	"Jai Jagannath"	Prem Anand	Bapu Goswami	
2024	"Jai Jagannath"	Prem Anand	Kaushal Kishore	
2024	"Aa Rahe Bhagwan Hai"	Rocky - Jubin	Prachi Chandra	
2024	"Gayatri Mantra"	Traditional		
2024	"Har Har Shambhu"	Payal Dev	Manoj Muntashir	
2024	"Shri Ram Chandra Kripalu"	Payal Dev	Manoj Muntashir	
2024	"Narayan Mil Jayega"	Payal Dev	Manoj Muntashir	
2024	"Hove Hove"	Vishal Shelke	Jessica Nandania	
2025	"Ishq Mera"	Akashdeep Sengupta	Mukund Suryawanshi	
2025	"Bedard Mere Dil Ko"	Kausar Jamot		
2025	"Raghuvar Humare"	Payal Dev	Manoj Muntashir	
2025	"Sab Kuch Bhagwan Tumhi Se Hai"	Payal Dev	Manoj Muntashir	
2025	"Shiv Kailasho Ke Vasi"	Traditional		
2025	"Aigiri Nandini Mahishasura Mardini Stotra"	Jubin Nautiyal	Traditional	
2025	"Madhurashtakam"	Jubin Nautiyal	Traditional	
2026	"Bajrang Baan"	Jubin Nautiyal	Traditional	
2026	"Eeja"	Neelesh Misra		
2026	"Mere Humnava"	The Rish	Rocky Khanna	
2026	"Hua"	Rocky - Jubin	Rocky Khanna	Elnaaz Norouzi
2026	"Shyama Aan Baso"	Raaj Aashoo	Manoj Muntashir	
2026	"Waade Saare"	Shubham Srivastava	Kaushal Kishore	

== See also ==
- List of Indian playback singers
