= List of songs recorded by Armaan Malik =

Armaan Malik songs

Armaan Malik discography
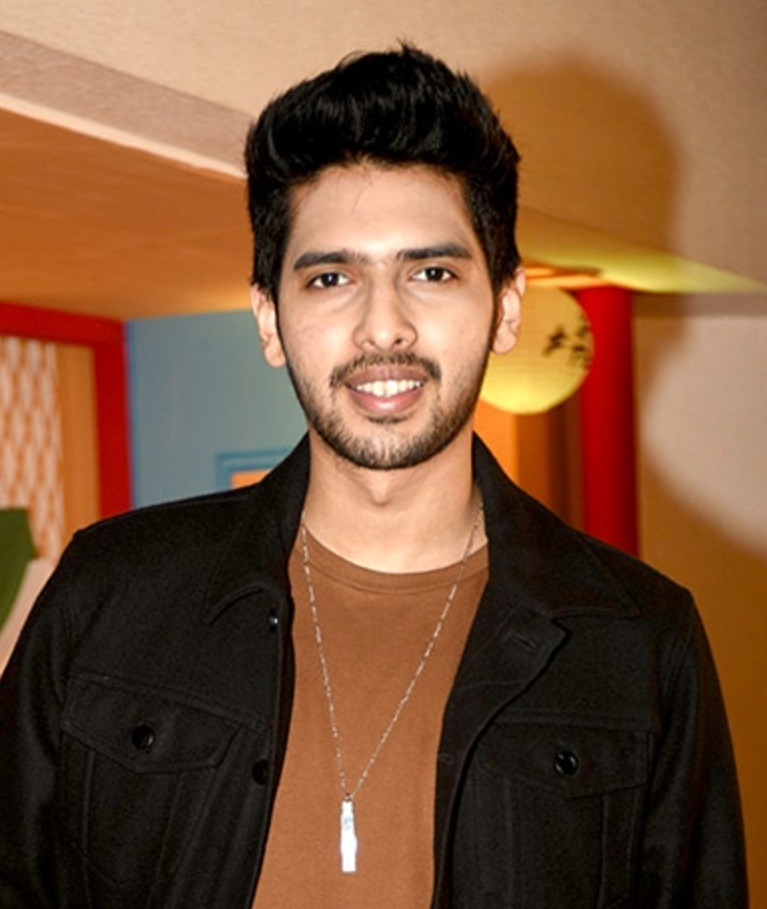
- Malik in 2016
- Studio albums: 1
- EPs: 1
- Singles: 18

Armaan Malik is an Indian singer and songwriter. He made his debut in Bollywood by singing the song "Bum Bum Bhole" from Taare Zameen Par in 2007. He has sung in Hindi, Kannada, Telugu, English, Bengali, Marathi, Tamil, Gujarati, Urdu and Malayalam. This is a list of songs recorded by him.

Number of songs recorded by Armaan Malik
Hindi film songs	135
Hindi non-film songs	51
Telugu film songs	62
Kannada film songs	55
Tamil film songs	20
Bengali film songs	17
Malayalam film songs	2
Marathi film songs	6
Gujarati film songs	3
Urdu film songs	4
Konkani film songs	2
Odia film songs	2
Total	358

== Hindi film songs ==
Year	Film	No	Song	Composer(s)	Lyricist(s)	Co-artist(s)	Note	Ref.
2007	Taare Zameen Par	1	"Bum Bum Bhole"	Shankar–Ehsaan–Loy	Prasoon Joshi	Shaan, Aamir Khan		
2007	Chain Kulii Ki Main Kulii	2	"Sunday"	Salim–Sulaiman	Irfan Siddiqui	Shravan Iyer, Kaustav		
2008	Bhoothnath	3	"Mere Buddy"	Vishal–Shekhar	Javed Akhtar	Amitabh Bachchan		
2009	Zor Lagaa Ke... Haiya!	4	"Koi Aaye Koi Jaye"	Bapi–Tutul	Amitabh Verma	Tanmay Chaudhari, Nilesh Singh		
2009	Zor Lagaa Ke... Haiya!	5	"Satrangi Sapno Ki"	Bapi–Tutul	Amitabh Verma	Tanmay Chaudhari		
2010	Rakta Charitra 2	6	"Khel Shuroo"	Dharam–Sandeep	Roop	Shree Kumar	Bilingual film	
2010	Ramaa: The Saviour	7	"Baam Cheek Cheek"	Siddharth–Suhas	Kumaar	Amit Kumar, Kaustabh, Arpana		
2010	Ramaa: The Saviour	8	"Sunlena Sunlena"	Siddharth–Suhas	Kumaar	Rachel Singh, Koustuv Ghosh		
2010	Ramaa: The Saviour	9	"Tumhara Bhashan" (Remix)	Siddharth–Suhas	Kumaar	Rachel Singh, Koustuv Ghosh, Shweta Pandit		
2011	Kaccha Limboo	10	"Jab Yeh Sitare"	Sudeep Chakravarti, Amardeep Nijjer	Sudeep Chakravarti, Prakash Dharmak			
2011	Kaccha Limboo	11	"Like This"	Ishq Bector	Ishq Bector, Kumaar	Ishq Bector, Shyam Gopal Balakrishna, Kush Ganatra		
2011	Kaccha Limboo	12	"Achha Saccha Kaccha"	Amardeep Nijjer	Prakash Dharmak	Shyam Gopal Balakrishna, Kush Ganatra		
2011	Chillar Party	13	"Aa Rela Hai Apun"	Amit Trivedi	Nitesh Tiwari	Amit Trivedi, Tanmay Chaudhari, Amitabh Bhattacharya, Arvind Vishwakarma		
2011	Chillar Party	14	"Chatte Batte"	Amit Trivedi	Nitesh Tiwari	Mohit Chauhan, Gaurika Rai, Keshav Rai		
2011	Chillar Party	15	"Ziddi Piddi"	Amit Trivedi	Nitesh Tiwari	Amit Trivedi, Tanmay Chaudhari, Gaurika Rai		
2011	Chillar Party	16	"Behla Do"	Amit Trivedi	Nitesh Tiwari	Firoza		
2014	Jai Ho	17	"Tumko To Aana Hi Tha"	Amaal Malik	Shabbir Ahmed	Marianne D'cruz, Altamash Faridi		
2014	Jai Ho	18	"Jai Jai Jai Jai Ho"	Amaal Malik	Shabbir Ahmed	Wajid		
2014	Jai Ho	19	"Love You Till The End"	Amaal Malik	Armaan Malik			
2014	W	20	"Wild Wild"	Daboo Malik		Daboo Malik, Amaal Mallik		
2014	W	21	"Tu Hawa"	Daboo Malik				
2014	Khoobsurat	22	"Naina"	Amaal Malik	Kumaar	Sona Mohapatra		
2014	Ungli	23	"Auliya"	Salim–Sulaiman	Amitabh Bhattacharya			
2015	Hero	24	"Main Hoon Hero Tera" (Armaan Malik Version)	Amaal Mallik	Kumaar			
2015	Hero	25	"Main Hoon Hero Tera" (Sad Version)	Amaal Mallik	Kumaar		Released separately	
2015	Calendar Girls	26	"Khwaishein" (Film Version)	Amaal Mallik	Kumaar			
2015	Hate Story 3	27	"Tumhe Apna Banane Ka"	Amaal Mallik	Rashmi Virag, Nadeem-Shravan	Neeti Mohan		
2015	Hate Story 3	28	"Wajah Tum Ho"	Amaal Mallik	Baman	Manoj Muntashir		
2016	Sanam Re	29	"Hua Hain Aaj Pehli"	Amaal Mallik	Manoj Yadav			
2016	Kapoor & Sons	30	"Buddhu Sa Mann"	Amaal Mallik	Abhiruchi Chand			
2016	Ghayal: Once Again	31	"Lapak Jhapak"	Shankar–Ehsaan–Loy	Amitabh Bhattacharya	Siddharth Mahadevan		
2016	Ki and Ka	32	"Foolishq"	Ilaiyaraaja	Amitabh Bhattacharya	Shreya Ghoshal		
2016	Baaghi	33	"Sab Tera"	Amaal Malik	Sanjeev Chaturvedi	Shraddha Kapoor		
2016	Azhar	34	"Bol Do Na Zara"	Amaal Malik	Rashmi Virag			
2016	Azhar	35	"Oye Oye"	DJ Chetas	Anand Bakshi	Aditi Singh Sharma		
2016	Do Lafzon Ki Kahani	36	"Kuch Toh Hain"	Amaal Malik	Manoj Muntashir			
2016	Junooniyat	37	"Mujhko Barsaat Bana Lo"	Jeet Gannguli	Rashmi Virag			
2016	Baar Baar Dekho	38	"Sau Aasmaan"	Amaal Malik	Kumaar	Neeti Mohan		
2016	M.S. Dhoni: The Untold Story	39	"Besabriyaan"	Amaal Malik	Manoj Muntashir			
2016	M.S. Dhoni: The Untold Story	40	"Jab Tak"	Amaal Malik	Manoj Muntashir			
2016	M.S. Dhoni: The Untold Story	41	"Jab Tak" (Redux)	Amaal Malik	Manoj Muntashir			
2016	M.S. Dhoni: The Untold Story	42	"Kaun Tujhe" (Armaan Malik Version)	Amaal Malik	Manoj Muntashir		Released separately	
2016	Saansein	43	"Tum Jo Mile"	Vivek Kar	Kumaar			
2016	Force 2	44	"Koi Ishara"	Amaal Mallik	Rashmi Virag			
2016	Wajah Tum Ho	45	"Dil Mein Chhupa Lunga"	Meet Bros	Kumaar	Tulsi Kumar		
2016	Wajah Tum Ho	46	"Dil Ke Paas" (Unplugged)	Abhijit Vaghani	Rajinder Krishan	Tulsi Kumar		
2016	Ek Kahani Julie Ki	47	"O Re Piya"	DJ Sheizwood	Taufique Pallavi			
2017	Commando 2	48	"Hare Krishna Hare Ram"	Gourov–Roshin	Sameer			
2017	Commando 2	49	"Tere Dil Mein"	Mannan Shaah	Aatish Kapadia			
2017	Commando 2	50	"Tere Dil Mein" (Club Mix)	Mannan Shaah	Aatish Kapadia			
2017	Noor	51	"Uff Yeh Noor"	Amaal Malik	Manoj Muntashir			
2017	Sweetiee Weds NRI	52	"O Saathiya"	Arko	Prakriti Kakar			
2017	Sweetiee Weds NRI	53	"Shiddat"	Raaj Aashoo	Shakeel Azmi			
2017	Mubarakan	54	"The Goggle Song"	Amaal Malik	Kumaar			
2017	Babumoshai Bandookbaaz	55	"Barfani" (Male)	Gaurav Dagaonkar	Galib Asad Bhopali			
2017	Chef	56	"Tere Mere"	Amaal Malik	Rashmi Virag			
2017	Chef	57	"Tere Mere" (Reprise)	Amaal Malik	Rashmi Virag			
2017	Golmaal Again	58	"Hum Nahi Sudhrenge"	Kumaar				
2017	Tumhari Sulu	59	"Farrata"	Amartya Bobo Rahut	Siddhant Kaushal			
2017	Tera Intezaar	60	"Khali Khali Dil"	Raaj Aashoo	Shabbir Ahmed	Payal Dev		
2018	Nirdosh	61	"Barf Si"	Harry Anand	Amit Khan			
2018	Dil Juunglee	62	"Beat Juunglee"	Tanishk Bagchi	Tanishk Bagchi, Vayu			
2018	Hate Story 4	63	Badnamiyaan	Baman–Chand	Rashmi Virag			
2018	October	64	"Theher Ja"	Abhishek Arora	Abhiruchi Chand			
2018	Ekta	65	"Aaj Se Pehle"	Daboo Malik	Devendra Kafir			
2018	2.0	66	"Mechanical Sundariye"	A.R. Rahman	Abbas Tyrewala	Shashaa Tirupati	Dubbed film	
2018	102 Not Out	67	"Kuch Anokhe Rules"	Salim-Sulaiman	Saumya Joshi			
2018	Mausam Ikrar Ke Do Pal Pyar Ke	68	"Tere Bina"	Bappi Lahiri	Dr. Deepak Sneh			
2019	Why Cheat India	69	"Dil Mein Ho Tum"	Rochak Kohli	Manoj Muntashir			
2019	Amavas	70	"Zikr"	Asad Khan	Junaid Wasi			
2019	Amavas	71	"Jab Se Mera Dil"	Sanjeev-Darshan	Sandeep Nath	Palak Muchhal		
2019	Kabir Singh	72	"Pehla Pyaar"	Vishal Mishra	Irshad Kamil			
2019	Article 15	73	"Intezaari"	Anurag Saikia	Shakeel Azmi			
2019	Pranaam	74	"Sirf Tu"	Vishal Mishra	Manoj Muntashir			
2019	Badla	75	"Kyun Rabba"	Amaal Mallik	Kumaar			
2019	Badla	76	"Kyun Rabba" (Reprise)	Amaal Mallik	Kumaar			
2019	De De Pyaar De	77	"Chaale Aana"	Amaal Mallik	Kunaal Verma			
2019	Pailwaan	78	"Saiyyare"	Arjun Janya	Astha Jagiasi, Sujeet Shetty		Dubbed film	
2019	Yeh Saali Aashiqui	79	"Hawaa Banke"	Hitesh Modak	Tanveer Gazi			
2019	Yeh Saali Aashiqui	80	"Bewaqoofi"	Hitesh Modak	Tanveer Gazi			
2019	Pati Patni Aur Woh	81	"Hum Toh Udd Gaye"	Ritviz		Aditi Singh Sharma	Released throw the film	
2019	Aladdin	82	"One Jump A Head"	Alan Menken			Dubbed	
2019	Aladdin	83	"One Jump A"(Reprise)	Alan Menken				
2019	Aladdin	84	"A Whole New World"	Alan Menken		Monali Thakur		
2019	Aladdin	85	"One Jump A"(Reprise ll)	Alan Menken				
2019	The Lion King	86	"Hakuna Matata"	Hans Zimmer				
2019	The Lion King	87	"Pyar Ki Yeh Sham Hai"	Hans Zimmer		Sunidhi Chauhan		
2020	Darbar	88	"Dil Toh Cute Hain"	Anirudh Ravichander	Raqueeb Alam		Dubbed film	
2020	Gunjan Saxena: The Kargil Girl	89	"Mann Ki Dori" (Male)	Amit Trivedi	Kausar Munir		Netflix film	
2020	Khuda Haafiz	90	"Mera Intezaar"	Mithoon			Disney Plus Hotstar film	
2021	Saina	91	"Main Hoon Na Tere"	Amaal Mallik	Kunaal Vermaa			
2021	Koi Jaane Na	92	"Koi Jaane Na"	Amaal Mallik	Kumaar			
2021	99 Songs	93	"Humnawaa"	A. R. Rahman	Dilshaad Shabbir Shaikh	Shashaa Tirupati		
2021	Bell Bottom	94	"Tum Aaogey"	Amaal Mallik	Rashmi Virag			
2021	Thalaivii	95	"Teri Aankhon Mein"	G. V. Prakash Kumar	Irshad Kamil	Prajakta Shukre	Bilingual film	
2021	Bhoot Police	96	"Mujhe Pyaar Pyaar Hai"	Sachin–Jigar	Priya Saraiya	Shreya Ghoshal	Disney Plus Hotstar film	
2021	Tez Raftaar	97	"Maa"	Rajib–Mona	Ravi Basnet			
2021	Velle	98	"Shukar Manava"	Yug Bhusal	Siddharth-Garima			
2021	Velle	99	"Yaaron Ka Bulaava"	Rochak Kohli	Vayu Shrivastav	Asees Kaur		
2022	Radhe Shyam	100	"Jaan Hai Meri"	Amaal Mallik	Rashmi Virag		Bilingual film	
2022	Radhe Shyam	101	"Labon Pe Naam"	Amaal Mallik	Rashmi Virag		Bilingual film	
2022	Radhe Shyam	102	"Jaan Hai Meri" (Lofi)	Amaal Mallik	Rashmi Virag		Bilingual film	
2022	Hurdang	103	"Kya Yehi Pyaar Hai"	Amaal Mallik	Rashmi Virag			
2022	Bhool Bhulaiyaa 2	104	"De Taali"	Pritam	Amitabh Bhattacharya, Yo Yo Honey Singh	Yo Yo Honey Singh, Shashwat Singh		
2022	Major	105	"Oh Isha"	Sricharan Pakala	Poojan Kohli	Chinmayi Sripaada	Dubbed film	
2022	Ardh	106	"Ishq Ka Manjha"	Palash Muchhal	Palak Muchhal		Zee5 film	
2022	Dobaaraa	107	"Waqt Ke Jungle"	Gaurav Chatterji	Hussain Haidry			
2022	Saroj Ka Rishta	108	"Ajnabee Ban Gaye"	Rahul Jain	Kunaal Vermaa			
2022	Vikram Vedha	109	"Yaara"	Sam C. S.	Manoj Muntashir			
2022	Banaras	110	"Maaya Gange"	B. Ajaneesh Loknath	Arafat Mohammed		Dubbed film	
2022	Mister Mummy	111	"Chupke Chupke"	Rochak Kohli	Kumaar	Shilpa Rao		
2022	Mister Mummy	112	"Chupke Chupke (Film Version)"	Rochak Kohli	Kumaar	Shilpa Rao		
2022	Nazar Andaaz	113	"Sukoon"	Vishal Mishra	Raj Shekhar			
2022	Ved	114	"My One and Only"	Ajay–Atul	Kshitij Patwardhan		Dubbed film	
2023	Shaakuntalam	115	"Madhur Kal Tu"	Mani Sharma	Prashant Ingole	Shweta Mohan	Dubbed film	
2023	Gumraah	116	"Ghar Nahi Jaana"	Tanishk Bagchi	Rashmi Virag	Zahrah S Khan, Salma Agha		
2023	Chatrapathi	117	"Gamey Gamey"	Tanishk Bagchi	Mayur Puri	Zahrah S Khan		
2023	I Love You	118	"Hai Tu"	Gaurav Chatterji	Ginny Diwan			
2023	Dono	119	"Dono"(Solo)	Shankar–Ehsaan–Loy	Irshad Kamil			
2023	Dono	120	"Dono"(Duet)	Shankar–Ehsaan–Loy	Irshad Kamil	Shrinidhi Ghatate		
2023	Pyaar Hai To Hai	121	"Pyaar Hai To Hai"	Anique	Dheeraj Kumar	Palak Muchhal		
2023	Pyaar Hai To Hai	122	"Pyaar Hai To Hai"(Reprise)	Anique				
2024	Main Atal Hoon	123	"Ankaha"	Salim–Sulaiman	Manoj Muntashir	Shreya Ghoshal		
2024	The Goat Life	124	"Khatti Si Woh Imli"	A. R. Rahman	Prasoon Joshi	Chinmayi Sripaada, Rakshita Suresh	Dubbed film	
2024	Do Aur Do Pyaar	125	"Jazbaati Hai Dil'	Lost Stories (DJs)	Kunaal Vermaa	Ananya Birla		
2024	Patna Shukla	126	"Jeetega Tera"	Samuel - Akanksha	Manoj Kumar Nath			
2024	Pad Gaye Pange	127	"Kya Hua"	Dhawal Tandon	Akrita Shrivastava			
2024	Love, Sitara	128	"Tera Jashn Manana Hai"	Sangeet-Siddharth	Rashmin Dighe	Sangeet-Siddharth		
2025	Suswagatam Khushaamadeed	129	"Ban Piya"	Amol–Abhishek	Abhishek Talented	Dhvani Bhanushali		
2025	Mirai	130	"Vibe Hai Baby"	Gowra Hari	Riturraj Tripathii		Dubbed film	
2025	Love in Vietnam	131	"Bade Din Huye"	Amaal Mallik	Raahmi Virag			
2025	Love in Vietnam	132	"Jeena Nahi"	Amaal Mallik	Raahmi Virag			
2025	De De Pyaar De 2	133	"Aakhri Salaam"	Sagar Bhatia				
2025	Gustaakh Ishq	134	"Chal Musafir"	Vishal Bhardwaj	Gulzar			
2026	Bhooth Bangla	135	"Ram Ji Aake Bhala Karenge"	Pritam	Kumaar, Mellow D	Aarvan, Mellow D		
2026	Prem Keetanu	136	"Kaho Toh"	Annkur R Pathakk	Sachin Urmtosh	Altamash Faridi		

== Replaced songs ==
Year	Film	#	Song	Composer(s)	Lyricist(s)	Replaced By	Note	Ref.
2015	Single	1	"Chal Wahan Jaate Hain"	Amaal Malik	Rashmi Virag	Arijit Singh		
2017	Half Girlfriend	2	"Baarish"	Tanishk Bagchi	Arafat Mehmood, Tanishk Bagchi	Ash King		
2019	Why Cheat India	3	"Phir Mulaaqat"	Kunaal–Rangon	Kunaal Verma	Jubin Nautiyal		
2019	Marjaavaan	4	"Kinna Sona"	Meet Bros	Kumaar	Jubin Nautiyal		
2019	Pati Patni Aur Woh	5	"Tu Hi Yaar Mera"	Rochak Kohli	Kumaar	Arijit Singh	Used in the film	
2022	Sarkaru Vaari Paata	6	"Murari Vaa"	Thaman S	Ananth Sriram	Sri Krishna	Telugu film	
2023	Tu Jhoothi Main Makkaar	7	"Jaadui"	Pritam	Amitabh Bhattacharya	Jubin Nautiyal		

== Unreleased songs ==
Year	Film	#	Song	Composer(s)	Lyricist(s)	Note	Ref.
2019	Batla House	1	Unknown	Rochak Kohli			
2019	Pati Patni Aur Woh	2	Udd Gaye	Rochak Kohli	Kumaar	Removed, after copyright claimed by Ritviz	
2021	Dybbuk	3	"Akhiyaan Ladaiya"	Gourav Dasgupta	Rakesh Kumar Pal	Amazon Prime Video film	
2023	Dear Ishq	4	Ishq Tu Mera	JAM8	Shloke Lal	Added in show	

== Hindi non-film songs ==
#	Song	Year	Album	Composer(s)	Lyricist(s)	Co-artist(s)	Note
1	"Tu Zaroori"	2014	—N/a	Sharib–Toshi	Shakeel Azmi		Cover version
2	"Tu Hi Tu"	2015	—N/a	Himesh Reshammiya	Mayur Puri		Cover version
3	"Jeena Jeena"	2015	—N/a	Sachin–Jigar	Dinesh Vijan, Priya Saraiya		Cover version
4	"Main Rahoon Ya Na Rahoon"	2015	—N/a	Amaal Mallik	Rashmi Virag		featuring Emraan Hashmi, Esha Gupta
5	"Chand Chupa"	2016	Suron Ke Rang	Ismail Darbar	Mehboob		Recreated by Amaal Mallik
6	"Pyaar Manga Hai"	2016	—N/a	Abhijit Vaghani	Manoj Muntashir	Neeti Mohan	featuring Zareen Khan, Ali Fazal
7	"Dil Ke Paas" (Unplugged)	2016	T-Series Acoustics	Abhijit Vaghani	Rajendra Krishan	Tulsi Kumar	
8	"Kaun Tujhe & Kuch Toh Hai Mashup"	2017	T-Series Acoustics	Amaal Mallik	Manoj Muntashir		
9	"Tose Naina-Tum Jo Aaye"	2017	T-Series Mixtape	Abhijit Vaghani		Tulsi Kumar	
10	"Main Agar Kahoon-Bol Do Na Zara"	2017	T-Series Mixtape	Abhijit Vaghani	Javed Akhtar, Rashmi Virag	Jonita Gandhi	
11	"Kehta Hai Pal Pal" (Remix)	2017	—N/a	Gourov–Roshin, Anand Raaj Anand	Kumar, Anand Raj Anand	Sukriti Kakar	featuring Sachiin J. Joshi, Alankrita Sahai
12	"Paas Aao"	2017	—N/a	Amaal Mallik	Rashmi Virag	Prakriti Kakar	featuring Sushant Singh Rajput, Kriti Sanon
13	"Kho Na Doon"	2017	Jaana Na Dil Se Door	Paresh Shah	Rashmi Virag	Palak Muchhal	Theme song
14	"Tere Bin Nahi Lagda"	2017	—N/a	Prem–Hardeep	Khawaja Pervaiz		
15	"Bol Do Na Zara Unplugged"	2018	MTV Unplugged (Season 7)	Amaal Malik	Rashmi Virag		
16	"Main Hoon Hero Unplugged"	2018	MTV Unplugged (Season 7)	Amaal Malik	Kumaar		
17	"Main Rahoon Ya Na Rahoon Unplugged"	2018	MTV Unplugged (Season 7)	Amaal Malik	Rashmi Virag	Amaal Mallik	
18	"Sab Tera Unplugged"	2018	MTV Unplugged (Season 7)	Amaal Malik	Sanjeev Chaturvedi		
19	"Tere Mere Unplugged"	2018	MTV Unplugged (Season 7)	Amaal Malik	Rashmi Virag		
20	"Ghar Se Nikalte Hi"	2018	—N/a	Amaal Malik	Kunaal Vermaa		
21	"Tum Hi Ho-Rehnuma"	2019	T-Series Mixtape (Season 2)	Amaal Malik	Abhijit Vaghani		Shreya Ghoshal
22	"Darkhaast-Aankhon Mein Teri"	2019	T-Series Mixtape (Season 2)		Abhijit Vaghani	Sukriti Kakar	
23	"Naya Jahan"	2019	Aladdin	Alan Menken	Irshad Kamil	Monali Thakur	Hindi version
24	"One Jump Ahead"	2019	Aladdin	Alan Menken	Irshad Kamil		Hindi version
25	"Humein Tumse Pyaar Kitna"	2019	—N/a	R.D. Burman	Majrooh Sultanpuri		Cover version
26	"Shaamein"	2019	Broken But Beautiful (Season 2)	Amaal Mallik	Manoj Muntashir		
27	"Hakuna Matata"	2019	The Lion King			Sneha Shankar	Hindi version, featuring Shreyas Talpade
28	"Pyaar Ki Ye Shaam Hai"	2019	The Lion King			Sunidhi Chauhan	Hindi version, featuring Shreyas Talpade
29	"Jaane Na Dunga Kahin"	2020	Never Kiss Your Best Friend (Season 1)	Yash Narvekar			TV series
30	"Kyun Judaa"	2020	Never Kiss Your Best Friend (Season 1)	Yash Narvekar			TV series
31	"Sa Re Ga Ma Pa Title Track"	2020	—N/a	Amaal Mallik	Kunaal Vermaa		Hindi version
32	"Couple Goals"	2020	Bandish Bandits	Shankar–Ehsaan–Loy	Tanishk Nabar	Jonita Gandhi	Web series
33	"Humein Tumse Pyaar"	2020	—N/a	R.D Burman	Majrooh Sultanpuri		Cover version
34	"Gerua"	2020	Jammin' 3	Pritam	Amitabh Bhattacharya	Jonita Gandhi	
35	"Kabhi To Nazar Milao"	2020	Jammin' 3	Adnan Sami	Riaz ur Rehman Saghar	Jonita Gandhi	
36	"Bin Tere"	2020	Jammin' 3	Vishal–Shekhar	Kumaar	Jonita Gandhi	
37	"Veham"	2020	—N/a	Manan Bhardwaj	Rashmi Virag		featuring Asim Riaz and Sakshi Malik
38	"Kya Kiya Hain Tune"	2021	Broken But Beautiful (Season 3)	Amaal Mallik	Rashmi Virag	Palak Muchhal	
39	"Meri Pukaar Suno"	2021	—N/a	A. R. Rahman	Gulzar	Alka, K. S., Shreya, Sadhana, Shashaa, Asees	
40	"Aye Mere Humsafar/Ab Mujhe Raat Din"	2021	T-Series Mixtape (Season 3)	Abhijit Vaghani		Palak Muchhal	
41	"Hasi"	2022	—N/a	Ami Mishra	Kunaal Vermaa	Amaal Mallik	
42	"Nindiya Re"	2022	Duroflex Sounds of Sleep (Season 2)	Yug Bhusal	Himanshu Kohli		
43	"Rehna Tere Paas"	2022	—N/a	Anurag Saikia	Kunaal Vermaa		featuring Priyank Sharma, Shivaleeka Oberoi
44	"Dil Diyan Gallan"	2022	The Unwind Mix	Vishal–Shekhar	Irshad Kamil		
45	"O Re Piya"	2022	The Unwind Mix	Salim–Sulaiman	Jaideep Sahni		
46	"Memu Aagamu"	2022	—N/a	Lost Stories and Elly	Kunaal Vermaa, Elly, S. Tiger	Tri.be	featuring Allu Arjun
47	"Ghalib Hona Hai"	2022	Sukoon	Sanjay Leela Bhansali	A. M. Turaz		
48	"Yaari Duniya Pe Bhaari"	2022	No1 Yaari Jam	Amaal Mallik	Kunaal Vermaa	Nikhita Gandhi, Amaal Mallik	McDowell's No.1 Commercial
49	"Wahi Toh Khuda Hai"	2023	—N/a	Mithoon			
50	"Kasam Se"	2023	—N/a	Amaal Mallik	Kunaal Vermaa		
51	"Tera Main Intezaar"	2024	—N/a	Amaal Mallik	Kunaal Vermaa		

== Telugu film songs ==
Year	Film	No	Song	Composer(s)	Lyricist(s)	Co-artist(s)
2010	Rakta Charitra 2	1	"Aata Ippudu"	Dharam Sandeep	Vayu	
2014	Rowdy Fellow	2	"Yedho"	Sunny M.R.	Krishna Chaitanya	Harishka Gudi
2016	M.S. Dhoni: The Untold Story	3	"Le Padha Padha"	Amaal Mallik	Chaitanya Prasad	
2016	M.S. Dhoni: The Untold Story	4	"Nuvve Pranayagni"	Amaal Mallik	Chaitanya Prasad	
2016	M.S. Dhoni: The Untold Story	5	"Ninne Tholi Premalo"	Amaal Mallik	Chaitanya Prasad	
2017	Katamarayudu	6	"Emo Emo"	Anup Rubens	Ananta Sriram	Shreya Ghoshal
2017	Mahanubhavudu	7	"Rendu Kallu"	S. Thaman	Krishna Kanth	
2017	Hello	8	"Hello"	Anup Rubens	Vanamali	
2018	Tholi Prema	9	"Ninnila Ninnila"	S. Thaman	Sri Mani	
2018	Tholi Prema	10	"Vinnane Vinnane"	S. Thaman	Sri Mani	
2018	Ekta	11	"Idhivaraku Epudu"	Daboo Malik		
2018	Naa Peru Surya	12	"Beautiful Love"	Vishal & Shekhar	Sirivennela Seetharama Sastry	
2018	Aravinda Sametha Veera Raghava	13	"Anaganaga"	S. Thaman	Sirivennela Seetharama Sastry	
2018	Padi Padi Leche Manasu	14	"Padi Padi Leche"	Vishal Chandrashekhar	Krishna Kanth	
2019	Mr. Majnu	15	"Yemaindho"	S. Thaman	Sri Mani	
2019	Mr. Majnu	16	"Koppamga"	S. Thaman	Sri Mani	
2019	Sita	17	"Koyilamma"	Anup Rubens	Lakshmi Bhupal	
2020	Ala Vaikunthapurramuloo	18	"Butta Bomma"	S. Thaman	Ramajogayya Sastry	
2020	Aswathama	19	"Ninne Ninne"	Sricharan Pakala	Ramesh Vakachakra	
2020	Orey Bujjiga	20	"Kurisena Kurisena"	Anup Rubens	Krishna Kanth	
2020	Solo Brathuke So Better	21	"No Pelli"	S. Thaman	Raghuram	
2021	30 Rojullo Preminchadam Ela	22	"Idhera Sneham"	Anup Rubens	Chandrabose	
2021	Yuvarathnaa	23	"Aarambame"	S. Thaman	Ramajogayya Sastry	Shreya Ghoshal
2021	Vakeel Saab	24	"Kanti Papa"	S. Thaman	Ramajogayya Sastry	Deepu
2021	My Indian Boyfriend	25	"Egire Egire"	Shravan Bharadwaj	Purna Chary Challury	
2021	Ichata Vahanamulu Niluparadu	26	"Hey Manasenduku"	Pravin Lakkaraju	Sreejo	
2021	Tuck Jagadish	27	"Kolo Kolanna Kolo"	S. Thaman	Sirivennela Seetharama Sastry	Harini
2021	Most Eligible Bachelor	28	"Guche Gulabi"	Gopi Sundar	Ananta Sriram	
2021	Miles Of Love	29	"Neelambari"	R. R. Dhruvan	Purna Chary Challury	
2022	2020 Golmaal	30	"Sukumaari"	Kanishka	Purna Chary Challury	
2022	Dharmapuri	31	"Nallareni Kalladhaanaa"	Osho Venkat	Bashkar Yadav Dasari	
2022	Shekar	32	"Kinnera"	Anup Rubens	Ananta Sriram	
2022	Major	33	"Oh Isha"	Sricharan Pakala	Rajiv Bharadwaj	Chinmayi Sripaada
2022	Sadha Nannu Nadipe	34	"Oh Prema"	Shubankar, Pratheek Prem	Sri Ram Tapaswi	
2022	Thank You	35	"Farewell Song"	Thaman S	Chandrabose	
2022	Ranga Ranga Vaibhavanga	36	"Kothaga Ledhenti"	Devi Sri Prasad	Sri Mani	Hari Priya
2022	Swathi Muthyam	37	"Nee Charedu Kalle"	Mahati Swara Sagar	Krishna Kanth	Sanjana Kalmanje
2022	Ori Devuda	38	"Paathashala Loo"	Leon James	Ananta Sriram	Sameera Bharadwaj
2022	Banaras	39	"Maaya Ganga"	B. Ajaneesh Loknath	Krishna Kanth	
2022	Urvasivo Rakshasivo	40	"Kalisunte"	Achu Rajamani	Krishna Kanth	
2022	Gurthunda Seethakalam	41	"Suhasini"	Kaala Bhairava	ShreeMani	
2023	Premadesham	42	"Padamule Levu Pilla"	Mani Sharma	Karunakar Adigarla	Harika Narayan
2023	Shaakuntalam	43	"Madhura Gathama"	Mani Sharma	Shreemani	Shreya Ghoshal
2023	Manu Charitra	44	"Ipude Parichayame"	Gopi Sundar	Chandrabose	
2023	Dilse	45	"Yella Yella"	Srikar Velamuri	Anantha Sriram	
2023	Skanda	46	"Dummare Dumma"	Thaman S	Kalyan Chakravarthy	Ayyan Pranati
2023	God	47	"Preminche Manasune"	Yuvan Shankar Raja	Krishna Kanth	Shivani Panneerselvam
2023	Spark Life	48	"Lekha Lekha"	Hesham Abdul Wahab	Anantha Sriram	
2023	Aadikeshava	49	"Hey Bujji Bangaram"	G. V. Prakash Kumar	Ramajogayya Sastry	Yamini Ghantasala
2023	Extra Ordinary Man	50	"Danger Pilla"	Harris Jayaraj	Krishna Kanth	
2023	Jorugaa Husharugaa	51	"Yuvarani"	Praneeth Muzic	Ramajogayya Sastry	Navya Sameera
2024	Bhoot Police	52	"Idhega Prema"	Sachin–Jigar	Kittu Vissapragada	Shweta Pandit
2024	Operation Valentine	53	"Gaganaala"	Mickey J. Meyer	Ramajogayya Sastry	
2024	Ravikula Raghurama	54	"Madhurame"	Sukumar Pammi	Sri Mani	
2024	11:11	55	"Emaindho"	Mani Sharma	Rakendu Mouli	
2024	Seetha Kalyana Vaibhogame	56	"Laagesaave"	Charan Arjun		
2024	Committee Kurrollu	57	"Prema Gaaradi"	Anudeep Dev	Kittu Vissapragada	
2024	Utsavam	58	"Marriages are made in Heaven"	Anup Rubens	Anantha Sriram	
2024	Sarangapani Jathakam	59	"Sarango Saranga"	Vivek Sagar	Ramajogayya Sastry	
2025	Robinhood	60	"Wherever You Go"	G. V. Prakash Kumar	Krishna Kanth	
2025	Mirai	61	"Vibe Undi"	Gowra Hari	Krishna Kanth	
2025	Santhana Prapthirasthu	62	"Telusa Neekosame"	Ajay Arasada	Sri Mani	

== Tamil film songs ==
Year	Film	No	Song	Composer(s)	Lyricist(s)	Co-artist(s)
2010	Rettaisuzhi	1	"Pattaalam Paaruda"	Karthik Raja	V. Ramasamy	
2015	Paayum Puli	2	"Yaar Inda Muyalkutty"	D. Imman	Vairamuthu	
2015	Vasuvum Saravananum Onna Padichavanga	3	"Sona Sona"	D. Imman	Na. Muthukumar	Varun Parandhaman, Maria Roe Vincent
2016	Kavalai Vendam	4	"Un Kadhal Irundhal"	Leon James	Ko Sesha	Shashaa Tirupati
2016	M.S. Dhoni: The Untold Story	5	"Pouraadalaam"	Amaal Mallik	P. Vijay	
2016	M.S. Dhoni: The Untold Story	6	"Konjam"(Version l)	Amaal Mallik	P. Vijay	
2016	M.S. Dhoni: The Untold Story	7	"Konjam"(Version ll)	Amaal Mallik	P. Vijay	
2017	Theeran Adhigaram Ondru	8	"O Sathiye"	Ghibran	Uma Devi	
2021	Naanum Single Thaan	9	"Maamazhai Vaanam"	Hitesh Manjunath		
2021	Annabelle Sethupathi	10	"Vaanil Megham"	Krishna Kishor	Una Devi	Chinmayi Sripaada
2022	Etharkkum Thunindhavan	11	"Summa Surrunu"	D. Imman	Sivakarthikeyan	Nikhita Gandhi
2022	The Legend	12	"Mosalo Mosalu"	Harris Jayaraj	P. Vijay	
2022	Banaras	13	"Maaya Ganga"	B. Ajaneesh Loknath	Palani Bharathi	
2023	Kick	14	"Pathu Murai"	Arjun Janya	Vivek	Saindhavi
2023	Iraivan	15	"Shades Of Love"	Yuvan Shankar Raja	Vivek	Shivani Pannerselvam
2023	Aalambana	16	"Eppa Paarthaalum"	Hiphop Tamizha	P. Vijay	
2024	Bhoot Police (D)	17	"Oh Enthan Kadhal"	Sachin–Jigar	A K Sathish	Dr Yasaswini Kamala
2024	Weapon	18	"Aasaikku Alavethu"	Ghibran	Vaisagh	
2025	Mr. Housekeeping	19	"Nee Naan"	Osho Venkat	Ku Karthik	
2025	Mr. Housekeeping	20	"Nee Naan" (Reprise)	Osho Venkat	Ku Karthik	

== Kannada film songs ==
Year	Film	No	Song	Composer(s)	Lyricist(s)	Co-artist(s)
2015	Siddhartha	1	"Free Idhe"	V. Harikrishna	Jayanth Kaikini	
2015	Siddhartha	2	"Jaadu Maadidanthe"	V. Harikrishna	Jayanth Kaikini	
2015	Siddhartha	3	"Achchaagide"	V. Harikrishna	Jayanth Kaikini	Archana Ravi
2016	Mungaru Male 2	4	"Sariyagi Nenapide"	Arjun Janya	Jayanth Kaikini	
2016	Mungaru Male 2	5	"Neenu Irade"	Arjun Janya	Kaviraj	Anuradha Bhat
2016	Mungaru Male 2	6	"Onte Songu"	Arjun Janya	Gopi Iyengar, Dr. Umesh Pilikudelu	Shreya Ghoshal, Swaroop Khan
2017	Sarvasva	7	"Nee Nanna Loka"	V. Sridhar	Kaviraj	
2017	Hebbuli	8	"Devare"	Arjun Janya	Harsha Priya	
2017	Chakravarthy	9	"Ondu Malebillu"	Arjun Janya	V. Nagendra Prasad	Shreya Ghoshal
2017	Saheba	10	"Heegethake"	V. Harikrishna	Jayanth Kaikini	
2017	Kariya 2	11	"Anumaanave Illa"	Karan B Krupa	Kaviraj	
2017	BMW	12	"Naa Hege Helali"	Sriram Gandharva	Gaurav	
2017	Raaga	13	"Aalisu Baa"	Arjun Janya	Kaviraj	Sanjeev Chimmalgi
2017	Raajaru	14	"Ondalla Ondu"	V. Sridhar	Jayanth Kaikini	
2017	Tarak	15	"Birigaaliyondige"	Arjun Janya	Jayanth Kaikini	
2017	Tarak	16	"Maathadu Nee"	Arjun Janya	Jayanth Kaikini	Shreya Ghoshal
2017	Enendu Hesaridali	17	"Prema Peeditha"	Surendhra Nath B R	Jayanth Kaikini	Palak Muchhal
2018	Hottegagi Genu Battegagi	18	"Ajnanadinda Thayi Berigee"	Ramchandra Hadapad	Narendra Babu	Shwetha Prabhu
2018	Johnny Johnny Yes Papa	19	"Neene Nanagella"	B. Ajaneesh Loknath	Dhananjay Ranjan	Bobby CR
2018	Krishna Tulasi	20	"Yeno Hosa Nantu"	Kiran Ravindranath	Hrudayashiva	
2018	Prema Baraha	21	"Prema Baraha"	Jassie Gift	Hamsalekha	Palak Muchhal
2018	The Villain	22	"Nodivalandava"	Arjun Janya	Prem	Shreya Ghoshal
2018	Swartharatna	23	"Ee Jeeva Kareyole"	B J Bharath	Jayanth Kaikini	
2019	Seetharama Kalyana	24	"Ninna Raja Naanu"	Anup Rubens	V. Sai Sukanya	
2019	Yaarige Yaaruntu	25	"Himada Raashiya"	B J Bharath	K. Kalyan	Supriya Lohith
2019	Face 2 Face	26	"Baayaarike"	Ek Khwaab The Band	Jayanth Kaikini	
2019	Badri v/s Madhumathi	27	"Khushiyo Khushiyu"	Elwin Joshwa		
2019	99	28	"Gamyave"	Arjun Janya	Kaviraj	
2019	Amar	29	"Onde Aetige"	Arjun Janya	Kaviraj	Shreya Ghoshal
2019	I Love You	30	"Maatanaadi Maayavade"	Kiran Thotambyle	Santosh Naik	
2019	Pailwaan	31	"Dhruvataare"	Arjun Janya	V. Nagendra Prasad	
2019	Lungi	32	"Nagabeda Ande Naanu"	Prasad K Shetty	Arjun Lewis	Shweta Mohan
2020	Sri Bharatha Baahubali	33	"Kannalle Kannalle"	Manikanth Kadri	Manju Maandavya	
2021	Yuvarathnaa	34	"Neenaadena"	S. Thaman	Ghouse Peer	Shreya Ghoshal
2021	Premam Poojyam	35	"Ambaari Prema" (Duet)	Raghavendra B S	Raghavendra B S	Mridula Warrier
2021	Premam Poojyam	36	"Ambaari Prema" (Solo)	Raghavendra B S	Raghavendra B S	
2021	Rider	37	"Davva Davva"	Arjun Janya	Chethan Kumar	
2022	Ek Love Ya	38	"Yaare Yaare"	Arjun Janya	Prem's	
2022	Prarambha	39	"Baari Neene Neene"	Prajwal Pai	Santhosh Naik	Ashwini Joshi
2022	Banaras	40	"Maaya Gange"	B. Ajaneesh Loknath	V. Nagendra Prasad	
2022	Raymo	41	"Neene Yella Berenilla"	Arjun Janya	Pavan Wadeyar	
2022	Prema (Private Song)	42	"Prema"	Shashikumar Shantharaju	Nagendra Bijur	Shashikala Sunil
2023	Cocktail	43	"Male Modada"	Loki Tavasya	Hrudaya Shiva, Siraj Miajr	
2023	Ponniyin Selvan: II	44	"PS Anthem"	A. R. Rahman	Gulzar	Nakul Abhyankar, Nabyla Maan
2023	Aparoopa	45	"Aniside Eko"	Prajwal Pai	Ghouse Peer	Sangeetha Ravindranath
2023	Baanadariyalli	46	"Maathella Haage Ide"	Arjun Janya		
2023	Sugar Factory	47	"Haneya Baraha"	Kabir Rafi	Raghavendra V Kamath	
2024	Ondu Sarala Prema Kathe	48	"Neenyarele"	Veera Samarth		
2024	Kotee	49	"Maathu Sothu"	Vasuki Vaibhav	Yogaraj Bhat	
2024	Bhuvanam Gaganam	50	"Bhuvana Gagana"	Gummineni Vijay	Aniruddha Sastry	Aishwarya Rangarajan
2024	Ibbani Tabbida Ileyali	51	"Taare Nihaare"	Gagan Baderiya	Nagarjun Sharma	
2025	Doora Theera Yaana	52	"Idenidu Soochane"	Ronada Bakkesh	Kaviraj	
2025	College Kalavida	53	"Singara Neene"	Suraj Jois	Sanjay Malavalli	Sunidhi Ganesh
2025	Mirai (D)	54	"Vibe Aithe Baby"	Gowra Hari	Varadaraj Chikkaballapura	
2025	Raashi	55	"Modala Preethi"	Vijay Palegar	Vijay Palegar	
2026	Koragajja	56	"Gaali Gandha"	Gopi Sundar	Sudheer Attavar	Shreya Ghoshal
2026	Love Seasons	57	"Maleyaago Modale"	Veer Samarth	Pramod Maravanthe	Pradnya Marathe
2026	TOSS	58	"Hello Hello Neelambari"	Kadri Manikanth	Yogaraj Bhat	

== Bengali film songs ==
Year	Film	No	Song	Composer(s)	Lyricist(s)	Co-artist(s)
2016	Love Express	1	"Dhitang Dhitang"	Jeet Gannguli	Prasen	
2017	Ami Je Ke Tomar	2	"Ami Je Ke Tomar"	Indradeep Dasgupta	Prasen	
2017	Amar Aponjon	3	"Ele Chupi Chupi"	Dabbu	Prasen	Antara Mitra
2017	Tor Karone	4	"Tor Karone"	Apeiruss	Isteaque Ahmed	
2017	Shrestha Bangali	5	"Ichhe Dana"	Monty Sharma	Priyo Chattopadhyay	Palak Muchhal
2017	Shrestha Bangali	6	"Dishey Hara Mon"	Monty Sharma	Lipi	
2018	Naqaab	7	"Tor Hata Chola"	Dev Sen	Prasen	Prashmita Paul
2018	Crisscross	8	"Aalo Chhaya"	Shubham Shirule for JAM8	Smaranjit Chakraborty	Shubham Shirule
2018	Chalbaaz	9	"Tor Premer Brishtite"	Savvy	Anyaman	Madhubanti Bagchi
2018	Villain	10	"Pyar Ki Dose"	Dev Sen, Aritra Shekhar Sanyal	Rivo	
2018	Villain	11	"Shundori Komola"	Subhadeep Mitra for JAM8	Sanjeev Tiwari	Antara Mitra
2018	Piya Re	12	"Tor Neshate"	Jeet Gannguli	Dipangshu Sengupta	
2018	Hoichoi Unlimited	13	"Oh Baby"	Savvy	Raja Chanda	Nikhita Gandhi
2018	Bagh Bandi Khela	14	"Mahi Re"	Jeet Gannguli	Raja Chanda	
2019	Kidnap	15	"Ektu Jayga Dena"	Jeet Gannguli	Ritam Sen	
2020	Jio Jamai	16	"Chhoya Chhuyi"	Dev Sen	Rivo	Debanjali B Joshi
2022	Shaan	17	"Cholo Pakhi Hoi"	Ahmmed Humayun	Prosen	Palak Muchhal

== Malayalam film songs ==
Year	Film	No	Song	Composer(s)	Lyricist(s)	Co-artist(s)
2017	Theeram	1	"Njan Varumee"	Afzal Yusuf	Rinu Razak	Tabitha Chettupally
2026	I'm Game	2	"Mazhavillaye"	Jakes Bejoy	Sharfu	-

== Marathi film songs ==
Year	Film	#	Song	Composer(s)	Lyricist(s)	Co-artist(s)
2016	Youth	1	"Je Hote Mala"	Vishal Rane, Jagdish Pawar		
2016	Kaul Manacha	2	"Man Manjiri"	Rohan-Rohan	Manoj Yadav	Shreya Ghoshal
2017	Rangeela Rayabaa	3	"Nakyawar"	Pankajj Padghat	Valay	
2020	Neighbours	4	"Luk Luk Tara"	Nishaad	Mangesh Kangane	
2022	Ved	5	"My One And Only"	Ajay-Atul	Guru Thakur	
2023	Jaggu Ani Juliet	6	"Tu Bi Aan Mi Bi"	Ajay-Atul	Guru Thakur	Shalmali Kholgade

== Gujarati film songs ==
Year	Film	#	Song	Composer(s)	Lyricist(s)	Co-artist(s)
2016	Daav Thai Gayo Yaar	1	"Mann Gamtu"	Parth Bharat Thakkar	Aishwarya Majmudar	
2017	Superstar	2	"Jaadugari"	Parth Bharat Thakkar	Niren Bhatt	
2023	Hurry Om Hurry	3	"Chal Taali Aap"	Parth Bharat Thakkar	Priya Saraiya	Aditya Gadhvi

== Pakistani film songs ==
Year	Film	#	Song	Composer(s)	Lyricist(s)	Co-artist(s)	Ref.
2016	Janaan	1	"Janaan"	Salim–Sulaiman	Fatima Najeeb		
2017	Mehrunisa V Lub U	2	"Beliya"	Simaab Sen	Gulzar	Aditi Paul	
2019	Sacch	3	"Danista"	Simaab Sen	Fatima Najeeb		
2019	Sacch	4	"Ishq Mera"	Simaab Sen	Fatima Najeeb		

== Konkani songs ==
Year	Film	No	Song	Composer(s)	Writer(s)	Co-artist(s)
2017	Mog Asom 2	1	"Novi Gadi"	Darrel Mascarenhas	Wilson Kateel	
2019	Mangalore To Goa	2	"Mhujya Anja"	Patson Pereira	Gani Dev, Niel Rasquinha	

== Odia songs ==
Year	Film	No	Song	Composer(s)	Writer(s)	Co-artist(s)
2024	TBA	1	Suna Maina	Bimugdha Das	TBA	Kiran Das
	TBA	2	Kete Manami	Bimugdha Das	Nila	

== Albums ==
Title	Details
Armaan	Released: 14 February 2014; Label: Universal Music Group India; Formats: CD, digital download; Link : https://spotify.link/HhDHstSbaEb

Title	Details
Only Just Begun	Release date: 26 October 2023; Label: Always Music; Formats:digital download; Link : https://spotify.link/L08mdE2baEb

== EPs ==
Title	Details
Sun Maahi	Released: 3 February 2023; Label: Always Music Global; Formats: digital download

== Singles ==
=== As lead artist ===
Title	Year	Album	Language
"Krazy Konnection" (featuring Salim Merchant)	2014	Armaan	Hindi
"Aaja Na Ferrari Mein"	2017	Non-album single	Hindi
"Tootey Khaab"	2019	Non-album single	Hindi
"Control"	2020	Non-album single	English
"Control" (Lost Stories Remix)	2020	Non-album single	English
"Next 2 Me"	2020	Non-album single	English
"Zara Thehro" (with Tulsi Kumar)	2020	Non-album single	Hindi
"Beech Raaste" (with Nikhita Gandhi)	2020	Non-album single	Hindi
"Control" (Stripped)	2020	Non-album single	English
"How Many"	2021	Non-album single	English
"Echo" (with Eric Nam and Kshmr)	2021	Non-album single	English
"Barsaat"	2021	Non-album single	Hindi
"You"	2022	Non-album single	English
"Nakhrey Nakhrey"	2022	Non-album single	Hindi
"Tu/You"	2022	Non-album single	English
"Bas Tujhse Pyaar Ho"	2022	Non-album single	Hindi
"Sun Maahi"	2022	Non-album single	Hindi
"Tabaahi" (with OAFF)	2023	Non-album single	Hindi
"HIIR" (featuring Lost Stories, Yashraj, Kimera)	2023	Non-album single	Hindi
"Dil Malanga" (with Nimrat Khaira)	2023	Non-album single	Hindi
"Manzoor Hai"	2023	Non-album single	Hindi

=== As featured artist ===
Title	Year	Language	Album
"2Step" (Ed Sheeran featuring Armaan Malik)	2022	English	Non-album single

== See also ==
- List of songs recorded by Arijit Singh
- List of songs recorded by Shreya Ghoshal
- List of songs recorded by Jubin Nautiyal
- List of Indian playback singers
