= Identity Card (disambiguation) =

Identity Card may refer to:

- An identity document
  - List of national identity card policies by country
- Identity Card (2010 film), a Czech film
- Identity Card (2014 film), an Indian film
- "Identity Card", a song by Kissing the Pink (KTP) from Certain Things Are Likely
- "Identity Card" (Arabic: بطاقة الهوية, romanized: Bitaqat huwiyya), a poem by Mahmoud Darwish
