= Haunted 3D: Echoes of the Past =

2026 Indian film by Vikram Bhatt

- Directed by: Vikram Bhatt; Manish P. Chavan
- Written by: Vikram Bhatt
- Produced by: Anand Pandit; Rakesh Juneja
- Starring: Mahaakshay Chakraborty; Chetna Pande; Gaurav Bajpai; Hemant Pandey; Shruti Prakash; Praneet Bhatt; Mannveer Choudharry
- Cinematography: Nared A. Gedia
- Edited by: Kuldeep Mehan
- Music by: Puneet Dixit; Prateek Walia; Nayeem-Shabir
- Production companies: Anand Pandit Motion Pictures; Promoedge Media; Vsb Pictures
- Distributed by: Anand Pandit Motion Pictures
- Release date: 12 June 2026
- Country: India
- Language: Hindi
- Budget: est. ₹15–20 crore
- Box office: ₹21.24 crore

Haunted 3D: Echoes of the Past is a 2026 Indian Hindi-language supernatural horror film written and directed by Vikram Bhatt. It is a spiritual sequel to the 2011 film Haunted – 3D and stars Mahaakshay Chakraborty (also known as Mimoh Chakraborty), Chetna Pande, Gaurav Bajpai, Hemant Pandey, Shruti Prakash, and Praneet Bhat. The film is produced by Anand Pandit, and Shwetambari Bhatt, with Mahesh Bhatt serving as a presenter. The film was released theatrically on 12 June 2026.

== Cast ==
- Mahaakshay Chakraborty as Devadutt Choudhary/Dev
- Chetna Pande as Sunehri
- Gaurav Bajpai as Titu
- Hemant Pandey as Trilok
- Mannveer Choudharry
- Shruti Prakash as Yamini Jairam
- Praneet Bhat as Vikrat
- Sunil Shakya as Thanedaar
- Kruti Desai as Madara
- Tia Bajpai as Meera Sabharwal
- Prasanna Kumara Dissanayake as Charley
- Achint Kaur as Margaret Malini
- Arif Zakaria as Professor Iyer (evil spirit ghost)
- Prachee Shah Paandya as Mrs. Stephens
- Mohan Kapoor as the priest
- Sanjay Sharma as the Sufi Baba (the ragpicker)

== Production ==
Following the success of their previous collaboration 1920: Horrors of the Heart, the trio of Mahesh Bhatt, Anand Pandit, and Vikram Bhatt reunited to create another horror film. The film is produced by Anand Pandit Motion Pictures and ASA Productions and Enterprises.

== Marketing ==
A teaser for the film was released on 3 September 2025, which received heavy criticism for its poor visual effects, evident green screen work, and artificial-looking backgrounds. In response to the backlash, the film was postponed and director Vikram Bhatt undertook 10 to 12 days of reshoots on real locations to improve the visual quality.

== Soundtrack ==
The music is composed by Nayeem-Shabir, Puneet Dixit and Prateek Walia while the lyrics are penned by Shakeel Azmi, Vikram Bhatt, Prateek Walia, Sandeep Singh Sardaraa, Puneet Dixit and Shweta Bothra.

=== Track listing ===
No.	Title	Lyrics	Music	Singer(s)	Length
1.	"Janmo Janam"	Vikram Bhatt	Prateek Walia	Mohit Chauhan	3:24
2.	"Dard"	Shakeel Azmi	Nayeem-Shabir	Jubin Nautiyal	5:05
3.	"Aashiqui Mein"	Prateek Walia, Shweta Bothra	Prateek Walia	Prateek Walia	4:04
4.	"Raaz Hai"	Shweta Bothra	Prateek Walia	Palak Muchhal	3:07
5.	"Nazrein Tu Mila"	Vikram Bhatt	Prateek Walia	Pragati Nagpal	3:31
6.	"Lauta Do"	Prateek Walia	Prateek Walia	Gurdeep Mehndi	3:01
7.	"Roya Na"	Sandeep Singh Sardaraa, Puneet Dixit	Puneet Dixit	Puneet Dixit	3:01
8.	"Nazrein Tu Mila 2.0"	Vikram Bhatt	Prateek Walia	Neha Karode	3:31
9.	"Janmo Janam - GenZ Mix"	Vikram Bhatt	Prateek Walia	Raghav Chaitanya	3:26
10.	"Satya Kahani"	Vikram Bhatt	Prateek Walia	Sudhir Yaduvanshi	4:27
Total length:					36:48

== Release ==
The film was earlier scheduled to release on 21 November 2025 but was postponed and is released in theaters on 12 June 2026.

== Reception ==
Sana Farzeen of India Today gave 2.5 stars out 5 and said that "The film's mystery holds attention, but weak VFX and minimal scares limit its impact." Bollywood Hungama rated it 2/5 stars and wrote that "On the whole, Haunted: Echoes of the Past rests on a promising story but suffers due to a poor climax, underwhelming music and the excessive, tacky use of VFX and AI." Archika Khurana of The Times of India gave 2 stars out of 5 and said that "A horror sequel that remains haunted not by spirits, but by its inability to move beyond the formulas of the past." Sreeju Sudharkaran, reviewing for Rediff.com rated it 1/5 stars and observed that the film had "no real scares, no real acting, no real sets, no real drama, no real crows and no real 3D effects."

Vinamra Mathur of Firstpost rated it 3/5 stars and stated that "Bhatt once again demonstrates his ability to create haunting worlds filled with emotional depth and supernatural intrigue. Fans of gothic horror and tragic love stories will find plenty to enjoy." Troy Ribeirio of Free Press Journal rated it 2/5 stars and writes that "The film remains caught between nostalgia and reinvention. It offers atmospheric pleasures, earnest performances and moments of emotional sincerity, but its reliance on familiar genre machinery prevents it from becoming the haunting experience it aspires to be." Rishabh Suri of Hindustan Times gave 1 star out of 5 and stated that what made the film unbearable "is not that it's bad. Bad films are made every Friday. It's that it lacks any effort."
