= EMI (film) =

2008 Indian film by Saurabh Kabra

E.M.I
- Film Poster
- Directed by: Saurabh Kabra
- Written by: Saurabh Kabra
- Produced by: Ekta Kapoor; Shobha Kapoor; Sunil Shetty; Shabbir Boxwala
- Starring: Sanjay Dutt; Neha Mehta; Arjun Rampal; Urmila Matondkar; Malaika Arora
- Cinematography: Paramvir Singh
- Edited by: Anand Subaya
- Music by: Songs: Chirantan Bhatt; Background Score: Sanjoy Chowdhury
- Distributed by: Balaji Motion Pictures; Popcorn Motion Pictures; Sahara One Motion Pictures
- Release date: 7 November 2008
- Country: India
- Language: Hindi

EMI (Extension: Easy Monthly Installment - Liya Hai Toh Chukana Padega!) (transl. If you have taken EMI then you will have to pay it) is a 2008 Indian Hindi-language social comedy film directed by Saurabh Kabra, starring Sanjay Dutt, Arjun Rampal, Urmila Matondkar and Malaika Arora.

== Plot ==
Sattar (Sanjay Dutt), owner of Good Luck Recovery Agency, is the saviour and the solution for all those caught in the debt trap. From Bhaigiri to business to politics to social work—that's how Sattar wants to progress in life. He has already graduated from Bhaigiri to business and is now eager to jump into politics.

Most sought after by banks, telecom companies and various multinationals, today his Good Luck Recovery Agency is a leading recovery agency. Sattar follows a simple rule when it comes to his business—Loan liya hai to chukana padega.

== Cast ==
- Sanjay Dutt as Sattar Bhai
- Arjun Rampal as Ryan Briganza
- Ashish Chaudhary as Anil Sharma
- Urmila Matondkar as Prerna Joshi
- Malaika Arora as Nancy Briganza (Ryan's girlfriend)
- Neha Oberoi as Shilpa Sharma
- Snehal Dabi as Sattar Bhai's crew member
- Manoj Joshi as Prem Prakash Patel
- Kulbhushan Kharbanda as Chandrakant Desai
- Daya Shankar Pandey as Gaffur Bhai
- Anant Mahadevan as Babu
- Neha Mehta as Prerna's friend

== Soundtrack ==
EMI

Soundtrack album by Chirantan Bhatt Saurabh Kabra
- Released: 19 September 2008
- Genre: Feature film soundtrack
- Label: T-Series

No.	Title	Lyrics	Singer(s)	Length
1.	"Chori Chori"	Shakeel Azmi	Sunidhi Chauhan, Suzanne D'Mello	04:21
2.	"Aankhon Hi Aankhon Mein"	Sarim Momin	Mohit Chauhan	04:39
3.	"EMI"	Shabbir Ahmed, Hamza Faruqui	Sanjay Dutt, Mahalakshmi Iyer, Suzanne D'Mello, Earl	04:27
4.	"Aaja Aa Bhi Ja"	Hamza Faruqui	Shaan, Suzanne D'Mello, Rishi	04:42
5.	"Roshan Har Dil"	Junaid Wasi	Neisha, Joy, Paarthiv	04:41
6.	"Vote for Sattar Bhai"	Amar Valentine	Ninad Kamat	04:22
7.	"EMI (Remix by Tarun Shahani and Vinayak Manohar)"	Shabbir Ahmed, Hamza Faruqui	Sanjay Dutt, Mahalakshmi Iyer, Suzanne D'Mello, Earl	03:35
8.	"Chori Chori (Remix by Tarun Shahani and Vinayak Manohar)"	Shakeel Azmi	Sunidhi Chauhan, Suzanne D'Mello	04:42

== Reception ==
EMI received mostly negative reviews with The Economic Times saying that its release timing is apt but EMI 'fails to generate interest for its juvenile outlook towards the issue.' Hindustan Times also panned the movie giving it 1.5 stars out of 5 and commenting that "Sanjay Dutt is repeating his Munnabhai act till he makes your toes curl." This film was declared disaster at box office India.
