= Tia Bajpai =

Indian singer and actress

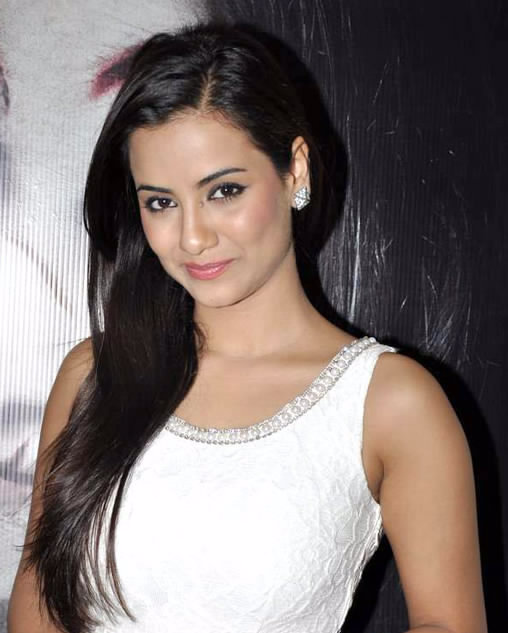
- Bajpai at the promotion of 1920: The Evil Returns in 2012
- Born: Twinkle Bajpai; Lucknow, Uttar Pradesh, India
- Occupations: Actress; singer
- Years active: 2005–Present

Tia Bajpai (born Twinkle Bajpai) is an Indian singer, television and film actress. She made her film debut in 2011 with Vikram Bhatt's film Haunted - 3D, and appeared in 1920: Evil Returns and Baankey Ki Crazy Baraat. She also participated in Sa Re Ga Ma Pa Challenge 2005.

== Career ==
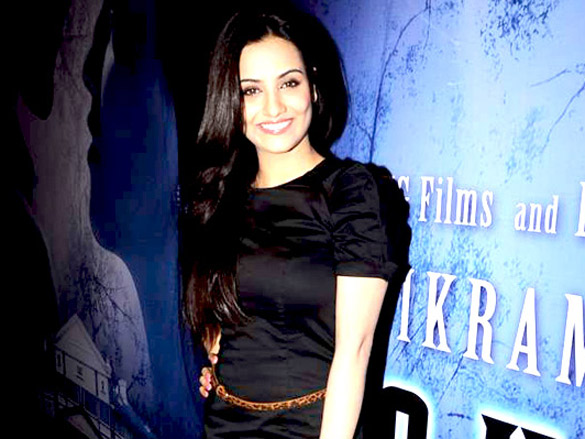
Bajpai at the success bash of Haunted 3D in 2011

Hailing from Lucknow in Uttar Pradesh, Bajpai started her career by appearing in a few television serials and shows. She made her film and singing debut in Vikram Bhatt's horror thriller Haunted 3D in 2011, co-starring Mahaakshay Chakraborty, where she portrayed the character of Meera Sabharwal who is tortured by her piano teacher (played by Arif Zakaria). Taran Adarsh of Bollywood Hungama rated 3.5/5 to the film.

In 2012, Bajpai appeared in Vikram Bhatt's next horror thriller 1920: The Evil Returns, sequel to the 2008 film 1920, alongside Aftab Shivdasani. She portrayed the role of Smriti, a girl who is possessed by an evil spirit. The film garnered average reviews from critics, but turned out to be commercially successful. In 2020, Bajpai released her first international solo album "Upgrade". The music videos for the album were released on YouTube. The song called "Bon Appetit" from the album was released on 23 May and features India's first 3D animation video. She was credited as Tia B on her album.

== Filmography ==
=== Film ===
Year	Title	Role	Notes
2011	Haunted – 3D	Meera Sabharwal	Debut film
2011	Lanka	Dr. Anju A. Khanna	
2012	1920: Evil Returns	Smriti/ Sangeeta	
2014	Desi Kattey	Guddi	
2014	Identity Card	Nazia Siddiqui	
2015	Baankey Ki Crazy Baraat	Anjali	
2018	Hate Story 4	Bhavna	Cameo
2023	Lakeerein	Kavya Agnihotri	

=== Television ===
Year	Title	Role	Notes
2005–06	Sa Re Ga Ma Pa Challenge 2005	Contestant	
2006–08	Ghar Ki Lakshmi Betiyann	Lakshmi Garodia; Lead role	
2008	Kyunki Saas Bhi Kabhi Bahu Thi	Vaidehi Laksh Virani	
2008	Lux Kaun Jeetega Bollywood Ka Ticket	Contestant	
2009	Ssshhhh...Phir Koi Hai - Parchaee		
2009	Ssshhhh...Phir Koi Hai - Tum Meri Ho	Kiran (Episode 110 & Episode 111)	
2009	Ssshhhh...Phir Koi Hai - Qayamat	Priyanka (Episode 166 - Episode 173)	
2011	Anhoniyon Ka Andhera	Herself	Special Appearance in a promotion of Haunted 3D
2017	Twisted	Disha Agarwal	

== As singer ==
Year	Film	Song	Co-Singer	Composer	Lyricist	Notes
2011	Haunted – 3D	Sau Baras	Solo	Chirantan Bhatt	Junaid Wasi	
2011	Lanka	Sheet Leher-II	Solo	Gaurav Dagaonkar		
2018		Chalte Chalte (Cover Version)	Solo	Saurabh Sengar, Jay Mehta, Aishwarya Tripathi; originally by Ghulam Mohammed	Kaifi Azmi	
2019	One Day: Justice Delivered	Tooh Hila lo	Divya Kumar, Farhad	Joy- Anjan	Alaukik Rahi	
2019		Main Gair Hui	Solo		A. M. Turaz	

== Accolades ==
Award Ceremony	Category	Recipient	Result	Ref.(s)
4th Mirchi Music Awards	Upcoming Female Vocalist of The Year	"Sheet Leher" from Lanka	Won	
