= Haunted – 3D =

2011 Indian film by Vikram Bhatt

- Theatrical release poster
- Directed by: Vikram Bhatt
- Written by: Vikram Bhatt
- Story by: Amin Hajee
- Produced by: Vikram Bhatt; Arun Rangachari; Om Raut
- Starring: Mahaakshay Chakraborty; Tia Bajpai; Achint Kaur; Arif Zakaria
- Cinematography: Pravin Bhatt
- Edited by: Kuldeep Mehan
- Music by: Chirantan Bhatt
- Production companies: ASA Productions and Enterprises Pvt. Ltd.; DAR Motion Pictures; BVG Films
- Distributed by: Reliance Entertainment
- Release date: 6 May 2011
- Running time: 143 minutes
- Country: India
- Language: Hindi
- Budget: ₹13 crore
- Box office: est. ₹ 36 crore

Haunted – 3D is a 2011 Indian Hindi-language supernatural horror film directed by Vikram Bhatt, starring Mahaakshay Chakraborty, Tia Bajpai, Achint Kaur and Arif Zakaria. It is the first Indian stereoscopic 3D horror film.

The promos and first look of the film were released on 7 February 2011. The film was released on 6 May 2011, receiving mixed reviews from critics. It emerged as a commercial success. The 3D Blu-ray was released on 3 August 2011. A sequel, titled Haunted 3D: Echoes of the Past, was released in 2026.

== Plot ==
Rehan travels to Ooty to prepare Glen Manor for sale but learns it's haunted after the caretaker dies. Initially skeptical, he encounters supernatural events and discovers a letter from Meera Sabharwal, revealing she was raped by her piano teacher, Iyer, in 1936, and her spirit remains trapped by Iyer’s spirit. Rehan brings a psychic, Mrs. Stephens, who warns him about the presence of the evil entity, but he stays and is attacked by Iyer's spirit. The next morning, a ragpicker catches Rehan's attention, tells him about the cries of the innocent girl and sends Rehan back to 1936. He wakes up, and is startled by the looks of the place. He then sees a newspaper which had the year 1936 written on it, indicating he is indeed in the year 1936 and has time travelled. He befriends Meera and attempts to protect her from Iyer, but events unfold as before, with Iyer hurting Rehan and Meera killing Iyer. Injured, Rehan warns Meera about future dangers. They seek help from a Sufi Baba to break the curse. During the journey, Iyer’s spirit kills the caretaker, possesses Margaret, he then follows them, trying to abduct Meera and kill Rehan, but Rehan and Meera reach the Dargah. The Sufi Baba directs them to a well that can end Iyer's curse. Rehan successfully throws Meera's pendant into the well, defeating Iyer's spirit, but accidentally returns to 2011. Rehan finds a letter from Meera thanking him for freeing her and sees she lived a happy life, indicating Glen Manor is no longer haunted.

== Cast ==
- Mahaakshay Chakraborty as Rehan Ahmed
- Tia Bajpai as Meera Sabharwal
- Prasanna Kumara Dissanayake as Charley
- Achint Kaur as Margaret Malini
- Arif Zakaria as Professor Iyer (evil spirit ghost)
- Prachee Shah Paandya as Mrs. Stephens
- Mohan Kapoor as the priest
- Sanjay Sharma as the Sufi Baba (the ragpicker)
- Mukesh Rawal as Bilawal Ahmed, Rehan's father

== Reception ==
=== Critical response ===
Upon release, the film opened to mixed critical reviews. The Times of India while giving it three stars out of five stated "if the film works -- and it works quite well -- is only because of the special effects of the film. Experiencing the horror in 3D is indeed a novel experience for the viewer, specially since it is smartly done." Taran Adarsh of Bollywood Hungama gave it three and a half stars and concluded that "Haunted is for today's movie savvy audience. It succeeds in keeping you tense and edgy, as a true poltergeist/horror flick should. There are scenes and situations aplenty to shock and astound the viewer coupled with the 3D effects, the prosthetics, the background score, an absorbing screenplay and deft handling of the subject material." Shubhra Gupta of the Indian Express rated it with two stars saying that "the only new thing about 'Haunted' is that it is Bollywood horror in 3D. The rest of it, by which we mean the principal stuff that makes it a film—story, location, characters—are all same old same old." Anupama Chopra of NDTV Movies awarded the film one and a half stars describing it as "an absolutely ridiculous horror movie that works better as comedy, unintentional of course." Preeti Arora of Rediff also gave it one and a half stars saying that "Haunted fails at reviving the age old haunted-house premise, bringing nothing new to the platter."

=== Box office ===
According to boxofficeindia.com, Haunted – 3D recorded the highest opening ever for an Indian horror film. Released with over 1044 prints, the film grossed ₹ 130 million during its opening weekend. By the end of its first week, the film grossed ₹ 143.0 million. In the second weekend, the film experienced a drop of 55% from its first weekend collections, grossing ₹ 3.50 crore for a ten-day total of ₹ 180 million. After four weeks, the film grossed ₹ 262.5 million in India, and ₹ 350 million worldwide. It was declared a Hit by Boxoffice-india.

== Soundtrack ==
The music is composed by Chirantan Bhatt while the lyrics are penned by Shakeel Azmi and Junaid Wasi.

=== Track listing ===
No.	Title	Lyrics	Singer(s)	Length
1.	"Jaaniya"	Junaid Wasi	Siddharth Basrur	5:07
2.	"Mujhe De De Har Gum Tera"	Junaid Wasi	Siddharth Basrur	4:58
3.	"Sau Baras"	Junaid Wasi	Tia Bajpai	5:05
4.	"Tera Hi Bas Hona Chahoon"	Junaid Wasi	Jojo, Ali Zaidi, Najam Sheraz	5:39
5.	"Tum Ho Mera Pyaar"	Shakeel Azmi	KK, Suzanne D'Mello	5:06
6.	"You're So Beautiful"	Junaid Wasi	Nikhil D'Souza	4:30
