= 1920: Evil Returns =

2012 film by Bhushan Patel

1920: The Evil Returns
- Movie poster
- Directed by: Bhushan Patel
- Written by: Vikram Bhatt; Sanjy Masoom (Tamil Dialogue)
- Screenplay by: Rensil D'Silva
- Produced by: Vikram Bhatt
- Starring: Aftab Shivdasani; Tia Bajpai; Vidya Malvade; Sharad Kelkar
- Cinematography: Naren Gedia
- Edited by: Swapnil Raj
- Music by: Songs: Chirantan Bhatt; Background Score: Amar Mohile
- Production companies: ASA Productions and Enterprises Pvt. Ltd.
- Distributed by: Reliance Entertainment
- Release date: 2 November 2012
- Running time: 119 minutes
- Country: India
- Language: Hindi
- Budget: ₹90 million
- Box office: ₹304.4 million

1920: Evil Returns is a 2012 Indian Hindi-language supernatural horror film written by Vikram Bhatt and directed by Bhushan Patel. A quasi-sequel to the 2008 film 1920, and the second of the 1920 film series, it stars Aftab Shivdasani, Tia Bajpai, Vidya Malvade and Sharad Kelkar. The film is third in a series of quasi-sequels released under the Bhatt Banner including Raaz – The Mystery Continues, Murder 2, Jism 2, Jannat 2 and Raaz 3D each of which had nothing to do with their respective prequels, but somehow fell in the same genre following a similar story. The trailer was released on 28 September 2012. The film follows a reclusive writer who after bringing in an amnesiac woman to his house, goes through increasing disturbing and haunting events, which leads him to believe what he is experiencing is supernatural and the woman has something to do with it.

The film released on 2 November 2012 to mixed reception and fared better at the opening Box Office weekend (122.7 million Net.) as compared to any other releases that week except Skyfall (270 million Net.). U Dinesh Kumar, Professor at IIM Bangalore and his team worked with Ami Shah of IntelliAssist, the company that carried out the social media marketing for the film, and assessed Internet activities and campaigns with the case study later published by Harvard Business Publishing.

== Plot ==
In 1920, Jaidev Verma is a famous poet who lives as a loner as Jaidev is unable to meet the love of his life, Smriti. Jaidev and Smriti got to know each other through an exchange of letters and slowly fell in love. While travelling at night, Smriti is attacked by a Possessed Badrinath, Smriti's driver. One of Smriti's employee visits and informs Jaidev that Smriti had died in an accident. Jaidev's sister, Karuna keeps Jaidev motivated. Jaidev finds an unconscious girl near a lake and brings her home. After gaining consciousness, she is unable to remember anything from her life except Jaidev's poems. Karuna becomes skeptical of her presence in the house and gets even more skeptical when an undertaker warns Jaidev and Karuna of an evil spirit inside the girl.

Jaidev is insistent on keeping the girl at home since Jaidev feels a connection with the girl. Jaidev names the girl as Sangeeta. Sangeeta experiences frightening phenomena, vomiting iron nails and seeing ghosts in her room. Jaidev takes Sangeeta to a hospital but the haunting continues. As the doctor is unable to treat Sangeeta, he suggests visiting another advanced hospital in Shimla. Jaidev and Sangeeta stay in a hotel on their way to Shimla. Outside the hotel, Sangeeta gets attacked by Possessed Badrinath, regains her memory and understands that she is Smriti. Sangeeta is possessed by the ghost and Jaidev brings Sangeeta to his house. Jaidev turns to the cemetery keeper, who warned about the possession earlier, for help. With the cemetery keeper's help Jaidev understands that Sangeeta is actually Smriti. Jaidev visits Smriti's address to find out the truth and discovers that Karuna had come to Smriti's house earlier, asking about Smriti. Jaidev returns home and finds Karuna's body hanging in the forest with suicide notes around.

From Karuna's suicide notes, Jaidev learns that his best friend, Amar, who envied Jaidev's success, had a sexual relationship with Karuna. When Amar discovered that Jaidev loved Smriti, he stole one of the love letters to find Smriti's address. Karuna confronts Amar about the letter. But he blackmails Karuna and she hides everything from Jaidev. Amar went to meet Smriti, posing as Jaidev, and took Smriti to his new residence which is under construction in Shimla. Eventually Smriti understands Amar's deceit and confronts him. Amar confesses his plan to Smriti while assaulting her. Smriti pushed Amar away and he fell to his death. Smriti and one of the employees hid Amar's corpse inside his residence. Amar's spirit is now possessing Smriti. Jaidev burns Karuna's corpse.

The cemetery keeper warns Jaidev that the spirit is very vengeful and has to be deceitfully taken to the place where Amar died. The cemetery keeper explains that once Smriti touches Amar's corpse, Amar's spirit will have to leave Smriti's body and return to Amar's corpse and the corpse can then be set on fire, destroying Amar's spirit. While doing this, Smriti must not know where Smriti is being taken; else the spirit will also know. Smriti is fully wrapped in a sacred cloth and taken to Amar's partly constructed house by Jaidev, the cemetery keeper and two of Jaidev's employees. The floor cracks and one of Jaidev's employees trips and the sacred cloth moves away from Smriti, awakening the spirit. The possessed Smriti kills all except Jaidev.

Jaidev is badly injured in the battle against the spirit. The spirit in Smriti's body eats the remains of the cemetery keeper's body and seemingly burns Amar's corpse, thus forever remaining in Smriti's body. Jaidev helplessly pleads with the spirit to kill him, since there is no meaning in letting Jaidev live if the spirit will take Smriti from him forever. Amar's spirit refuses, saying that this is exactly what Amar wanted: for Jaidev to suffer. Jaidev cuts a rope attached to a loft in the ceiling; a corpse falls on Smriti. It is revealed that Jaidev and the group had hidden the real corpse of Amar in the ceiling as a precaution. Amar's spirit leaves Smriti's body and enters the corpse. Enraged, Amar's corpse tries to kill Smriti, but Jaidev saves Smriti and sets Amar's corpse on fire, thus destroying Amar's spirit. Jaidev and Smriti consummate their union.

== Cast ==
- Aftab Shivdasani as Jaidev Verma
- Tia Bajpai as Smriti/Sangeeta
- Vidya Malvade as Karuna Verma
- Sharad Kelkar as Amar (evil Spirit)
- Vicky Ahuja as Bankimlal
- Sanjay Sharma as Bhola
- Tarakesh Chauhan as the doctor in the town hospital
- Naresh Sharma as the driver of a horse carriage
- Yogesh Tripathi as Chand
- Falguni Rajani as Smriti's landlord

== Soundtrack ==
1920 Evil Returns

Soundtrack album by Composer Chirantan Bhatt Lyrics Shakeel Azmi, Junaid Wasi & Manoj Yadav
- Released: 9 October 2012
- Genre: Feature film soundtrack
- Length: 27:20
- Language: Hindi
- Label: T-Series

The music for the film was composed by Chirantan Bhatt and the lyrics written by Shakeel Azmi, Junaid Wasi & Manoj Yadav. The music got positive reviews from critics.

=== Hindi ===
Track listing
No.	Title	Lyrics	Singer(s)	Length
1.	"Apna Mujhe Tu Laga"	Shakeel Azmi	Sonu Nigam	6:06
2.	"Uska Hi Banana"	Junaid Wasi	Arijit Singh	5:28
3.	"Jaavedaan Hai"	Shakeel Azmi	KK, Suzanne D'Mello	5:48
4.	"Khud Ko Tere"	Shakeel Azmi	Mahalakshmi Iyer	5:07
5.	"Majboor Tu Bhi Kahin"	Manoj Yadav	Amit Mishra	4:53
Total length:				27:20

=== Tamil ===
Track listing
No.	Title	Lyrics	Singer(s)	Length
1.	"Kattayam"	Sanjay Masoom	Various Artists	1:20
2.	"Uyire"	Sanjay Masoom	Arijit Singh	4:48
Total length:				6:08

== Critical reception ==
Renuka Vyavahare of Times of India gave it 3 stars. "1920 gives you the creeps...watch it." said ToI. Rediff Movies said "1920 Evil Returns is yet another needless horror film. It's cold and bland." and gave it 1 star. Roshni Devi of Koimoi gave it 2 stars. "Watch it only if you're desperate for some uninspiring horror. Give it a rest otherwise." wrote Roshni Devi. Social Movie Rating site MOZVO gave it a rating of 2.3 putting it in 'Below Average' category. Taran Adarsh of Bollywood Hungama gave it 2.5 stars.

== Box office ==
1920 – Evil Returns had a decent opening weekend where it collected around ₹115 million (US$1.2 million) nett. The film had a good first week and collected ₹160 million (US$1.7 million) nett. It had collected around ₹45.0 million (US$470,000) nett in its second week taking its total to ₹205 million (US$2.1 million) nett. It finished at ₹229 million (US$2.4 million) in the domestic market.

== Sequel ==
The reasonable success of 1920 – Evil Returns prompted producer Vikram Bhatt to plan another sequel. "I will be making another sequel to 1920. We are working on the script right now. It is too early to talk about it as we are developing the concept for it", Vikram said in an interview. It was also revealed that the film would not be in 3D. The sequel to the movie was later named as 1920 London, and released on 6 May 2016.

== See also ==
- Fear, another Vikram Bhatt horror film where the protagonist brings home an amnesiac woman and helps her fight off a ghostly spirit on her trail.
