= Ishq Ke Parindey =

- Theatrical release poster
- Directed by: Shakir Khan
- Written by: Rituraj Tripathi; Rajeev Arora; Shakir Khan
- Screenplay by: Rituraj Tripathi; Rajeev Arora; Shakir Khan
- Starring: Rishi Verma; Priyanka Mehta; Manjul Aazad; Abid Yunus Khan; Yasir Iftikhar Khan
- Cinematography: Najeeb Khan
- Edited by: Tapos Ghosh
- Music by: Vijay Vermaa; Rashid Khan; Sajjad Ali; Mukesh Officials
- Production company: Shyam Motion Pictures
- Distributed by: VIP Cinema
- Release date: 24 April 2015
- Country: India
- Language: Hindi

Ishq Ke Parindey (transl. Love birds) is a Hindi-language film starring Rishi Verma and Priyanka Mehta. The movie portrays the Indo-Pak conflict against the backdrop of a love story, and bears a message of peace.

== Synopsis ==
An innocent and beautiful Pakistani girl, Sheen arrives in Lucknow along with her family. There she meets Faiz, and love blossoms, but results in a deadly fight against their families.

== Production ==
The film was shot entirely in Lucknow, including at such famous locales as - Rumi Gate, [which?] Imambada, Hazratganj, Sheesh Mahal, Qaiser Bagh, Begum Hazrat Mahal Maqbara, the Residency, Jehangirabad Palace, Sultanat Manzil, Dada Miyan Dargah, and Teelewaali Masjid. The director of the film, Shakir Khan has been an associate director under Subhash Ghai on films like Pardes, Taal and Yaadein. DoP Najeeb Khan earlier served as cinematographer of blockbuster Gadar.

== Cast ==
- Rishi Verma as Faiz
- Priyanka Mehta as Sheen
- Manjul Azad as Kadir Bhai
- Abid Yunus Khan as Informer
- Yasir Iftikhar Khan as Shadab

== Soundtrack ==
Ishq Ke Parindey

Soundtrack album by Vijay Vermaa Rashid Khan Sajjad Ali
- Released: 1 April 2015
- Recorded: 2014
- Genre: Feature film soundtrack
- Length: 43:46
- Label: Zee Music
- Producer: Shyam Motion Pictures

The album has six songs and one qawwali, "Maula Karde Karam", sung by Javed Ali, Altamash Faridi, Aftab and Hashim Sabri. The other songs are sung by KK, Sonu Nigam, Javed Ali, and Palak Muchhal. KK sang in the film's signature song "Dil Tod Ke", composed by Vijay Vermaa, with lyrics by Manoj Muntashir, released on 8 April 2015.

Javed Ali and Palak Muchhal performed the romantic duet "Rab Se Maangi". Vijay Vermaa, Rashid Khan, and Sajjad Ali composed the songs, and Shakeel Azmi, Shakir Khan, Manthan, Irshad Khan, and Tanveer Ghazi wrote the lyrics.

=== Track listing ===
No.	Title	Lyrics	Music	Singer(s)	Length
1.	"Ishq Ke Parindey" (Part 1)	Shakir Khan	Sajjad Ali	Shadab Faridi	3:50
2.	"Tumse Mil Ke"	Shakeel Azmi	Vijay Vermaa	Javed Ali, Palak Muchhal	3:44
3.	"Rab Se Maangi"	Irshad Khan	Rashid Khan	Javed Ali, Palak Muchhal	6:17
4.	"Ek Hatheli"	Shakeel Azmi	Vijay Vermaa	Sonu Nigam, Keka Ghoshal	4:40
5.	"Saiyyan"	Sajjad Ali	Sajjad Ali	Raktima	2:10
6.	"Dil Tod Ke"	Manthan	Vijay Vermaa	KK	4:43
7.	"Qawwali- Maula Karde Karam"	Tanveer Ghazi	Rashid Khan	Javed Ali, Altamash Faridi, Aftab Hashim Sabri Brothers	7:03
8.	"Ishq Ke Parindey" (Part 2)	Sajjad Ali	Sajjad Ali	Shadab Faridi, Shakir Khan	1:17
9.	"Ek Hatheli" (Sad)	Shakeel Azmi	Vijay Vermaa	Sonu Nigam	1:46
10.	"Ek Hatheli" (Remix)	Saiyyan	Sajjad Ali	Sajjad Ali, Raktima	2:23
11.	"Rab Se Maangi" (Remix)	Irshad Khan	Rashid Khan	Mohd. Irfan, Suvani Raj	2:23
Total length:					43:46
