= Siddharth Basrur =

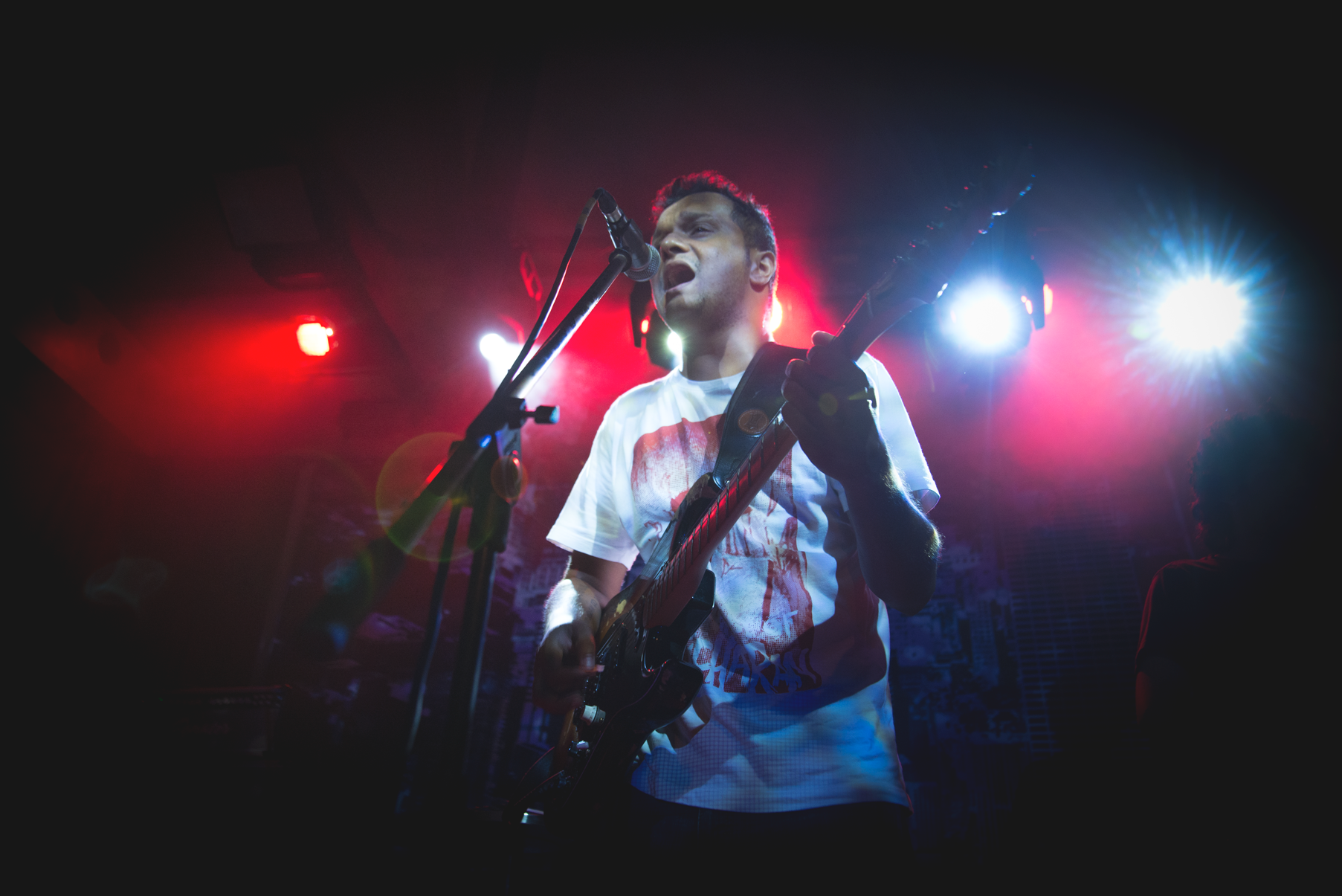
- Siddharth in 2013

Background information
- Genres: Indie, Bollywood, Playback singing, Progressive metal, Alternative rock
- Occupations: Singer, songwriter

Siddharth Basrur is an Indian vocalist, composer, and playback singer. He began his career in the indie music scene with his first band, Kinky Ski Munky. He is the frontman of Mumbai's progressive metal band, Goddess Gagged. Basrur has contributed to Bollywood movies such as Haunted 3D, Players, and David.

== Early life ==
Siddharth Basrur was born in 1981 and developed an interest in music during his childhood. He dropped out of his first year of college and started working in a music store. Basrur grew up listening to a wide range of music, from Alice Cooper to Kishore Kumar, influenced by his father and uncles, who were fans of classic rock 'n’ roll. By the age of 15, alternative rock had become his favorite genre.

== Career ==
Basrur earned a diploma in audio engineering and initially worked in the film industry, focusing on audio post-production. He later transitioned to content writing for Channel V in 2008 but eventually left to pursue music full-time. In 2000, Basrur composed vocal melodies for the band Kinky Ski Munky. His first significant break in commercial music came when he was asked by Chirantan, a friend involved in the making of the soundtrack for Haunted 3D, to sing two songs for the movie. In 2016, he sang the Hindi version of "We Know the Way" for the Hindi-dubbed release of the Disney animated feature film Moana.

== Performances and appearances ==
He was asked to open the show for the daughter of well-known late Indian sitar composer Ravi Shankar, Norah Jones, who performed at the 'A Summer's Day' music festival, held in Mumbai on 2 March 2013. Basrur and Meiyang Chang performed a jam session at the Jack & Jones store in Mumbai on 20 October 2013. He has also performed live at IndiEarth at the Park, held in Chennai.

== Music style and impact ==
Basrur's music ranges between a variety of genres like punk rock and indie rock, to metal music. In 2013, he released his solo album Chasing Rain in two chapters - respectively named Chapter 1 and Chapter 2.

== Awards and nominations ==
Siddharth Basrur won the MTV VMAI in 2013 for Roots Song of the Year. He has been nominated for the Radio Cit Awards in 2013, and also for the Jack Daniels Rock Awards in 2014 in the categories of song of the year and male artist of the year

== Discography ==
Bollywood

Year	Song	Movie	Composer
2011	"Mujhe De De Har Gham Tera"	Haunted – 3D	Chirantan Bhatt
2011	"Jaaniya"	Haunted – 3D	Chirantan Bhatt
2012	"Jhoom Jhoom Ta Hoon Main"	Players	Pritam
2012	"Jis Jagah"	Players	Pritam
2013	"Theme song" (Hindi, Tamil, Telugu)	David (Bilingual film)	Anirudh Ravichander
2014	"Wind of Change"	Paranthe Wali Gali	Vasundhara Das
2014	"Haseena Tu Kameena Mein"	Happy Ending	Sachin-Jigar
2015	"Naach Meri Jaan"	ABCD 2	Sachin-Jigar
2015	"Jaago Mohan Pyaare"	Katti Batti	Shankar-Ehsaan-Loy
2015	"Neend Na Mujhko Aaye"	Shaandaar	Amit Trivedi
2016	"Get Ready to Fight"	Baaghi	Pranaay Rijia
2016	"Paani Ka Raasta"	Raman Raghav 2.0	Ram Sampath
2016	"Parwah Nahin"	M.S. Dhoni: The Untold Story	Amaal Mallik
2016	"Roke Na Ruke"	Phobia	Daniel B George
2017	"Baat Ban Jaaye"	A Gentleman	Sachin-Jigar
2017	"Beparwah"	Munna Michael	Gourav-Roshin
2017	"Karaiyaadhe"	Solo (HindI dub)	Gourav Godkhindi
2017	"You"	Solo (HindI dub)	Gourav Godkhindi
2018	"Get Ready to Fight Again"	Baaghi 2	Pranaay Rijia
2019	"Jigra"	Uri: The Surgical Strike	Shashwat Sachdev
2020	"Bezuban Kab Se"	Street Dancer 3D	Sachin-Jigar
2020	"Get Ready To Fight -Reloaded"	Baaghi 3	Pranaay Rijia
2022	"Jungle Mein Kaand"	Bhediya	Sachin-Jigar
2023	"Hum Aaye Hain"	Ganapath	The White Noise
2023	"Bloody Sweet"	Leo (Hindi dub)	Anirudh Ravichander
2024	"Shaitaan Theme"	Shaitaan	Amit Trivedi
2024	"Hunter Ka Avtaar"	Vettaiyan (Hindi dub)	Anirudh Ravichander
2025	"I Am The Danger"	Coolie (2025 film) (Hindi dub)	Anirudh Ravichander

Kannada

Song	Movie	Composer
"Hulli Hulli"	Hebbuli	Arjun Janya
"Shiva Shankara"	The Villain	Arjun Janya
"Bloody Sweet"	Leo	Anirudh Ravichander
"Hunter Bandha"	Vettaiyan	Anirudh Ravichander

Tamil

Song	Movie	Composer
"Bloody Sweet"	Leo	Anirudh Ravichander
"Hunter Vantaar"	Vettaiyan	Anirudh Ravichander
"I Am the Danger"	Coolie (2025 film)	Anirudh Ravichander
"Rage Of Kaantha"	Kaantha	Jhanu Chanthar

Telugu

Song	Movie	Composer
"Bloody Sweet"	Leo (Telugu dub)	Anirudh Ravichander
"Hunter Entry"	Vettaiyan (Telugu dub)	Anirudh Ravichander
"Ragile Ragile"	Kingdom	Anirudh Ravichander
"I Am The Danger"	Coolie (2025 film) (Telugu dub)	Anirudh Ravichander
"Rage Of Kaantha"	Kaantha (Telugu dub)	Jhanu Chanthar

Malayalam

Song	Movie	Composer
"Bloody Sweet"	Leo (D)	Anirudh Ravichander
"Pyara Mera Veera"	Varshangalkku Shesham	Amrit Ramnath
"I Am The Danger"	Coolie (2025 film) (D)	Anirudh Ravichander

IPL 2018

Song	Music
Best vs BEST	Dan Mace

Solo Career

Album	Track list
Chasing Rain (Chapter 1)	In Between feat. Devesh Dayal
	Rain
	Stay
	Lifting The Veil
	Battleships feat. Naina Kundu
Chasing Rain (Chapter 2)	Light Up My Life
	Sandwich Song
	Come September ft.Vishal J.Singh

Singles
You Never Know
Logic Is Such A Liar
Make Me A Sandwich
Scuttle
Okakifreak – That's Right, Fool
Don't Release Me
Secrets

Goddess Gagged

Album	Track list
Resurfaces	Modern Machines
	Rosemary's Baby
	Dreamer
	Inspire
	Visionary
	Sink or Swim
	Preliminary Stages of The Master Plan

Singles
Shades
Flow
Push Me To Solidarity
Fine Lines
