= Identity Card (2014 film) =

2014 film

Identity Card is a 2014 Indian drama written, produced and directed by Rahat Kazmi. It stars Tia Bajpai, Prashantt Guptha, Furqan Merchant, Vipin Sharma, Brijendra Kala, Saurabh Shukla, Shoib Kazmi and Raghubir Yadav. The film is a depiction of police interrogation and the tension that prevails in Kashmir. The film won multiple international awards.
