= Humnava Mere =

2018 Hindi ballad song

Single by Jubin Nautiyal
- Language: Hindi
- Released: 22 May 2018 (video); 27 May 2018 (lyrical); 28 May 2018 (audio)
- Studio: Songbird Studios
- Genre: Indian pop
- Length: 6:07 (video); 5:49 (lyrical); 5:29 (audio)
- Label: T-Series
- Composer: Rocky-Shiv
- Lyricist: Manoj Muntashir
- Producer: Bhushan Kumar

"Humnava Mere" (Hindi: हमनवा मेरे transl. "O my friend/beloved") is 2018 Hindi language single. The ballad is sung by Indian playback singer Jubin Nautiyal. The song was composed by the musical duo Rocky-Shiv and the lyrics were written by Manoj Muntashir. It was presented by Gulshan Kumar and produced by Bhushan Kumar, under the label of T-Series.

== Release ==
The official music was released on 22 May 2018 by T-Series on YouTube. Meanwhile, the lyrical video was released on 27 May 2018. Same as, an audio version was released on 28 May 2018. It garnered over 36 million views in its first month of release. The lyrical video has gained over 92 million YouTube views as of February 2025. The official music video has received more than 1 billion views as of February 2025.

The director, Ashish Panda, has said that he preferred the song over the video and seeks guidance from lyrics and music. He added that they had 2 days in Venice and a crew of 6 people. They rehearsed it in India and working with Jubin was a pleasure.

Jubin said that it is sad song and is about unrequited love that has been felt in some lives' stages. He further added that he was introduced to this song 3 years earlier and it took more than the expected time. It's a very special song. Bhushan said that Jubin's fans would tell him they love this song and it would help him earn new fans.

== Music video ==
The music video is directed by Ashish Panda. It was shot in Venice. It features Jubin Nautiyal & Romika Sharma. In the beginning, Jubin (Raj in the video) is seen drawing a sketch of a female while sitting on a boat. Suddenly, he sees the same girl as in the sketch. They switch to a flashback where Raj and the girl are dating. One day, the girl comes to Raj and shows him her engagement ring and they break up, though Raj still loves her. They come back to the present where Raj is depressed and sketching when he sees this same girl wandering in Venice. He recognizes her as her beloved. The two go boating. At the end, she runs and Jubin chases her. She reaches her husband who was looking for her. She points towards Jubin, saying that he is Raj. However, her husband comes toward Jubin and apologizes, saying that she's mentally unwell and keeps calling for Raj all the time. He doesn't know who this 'Raj' is. Finally, Raj leaves and a depressing tune of 'Humnava Mere' is sung.

== Credits ==
=== Main credits ===
- Song – Humnava Mere
- Singer – Jubin Nautiyal
- Music – Rocky – Shiv
- Lyrics – Manoj Muntashir
- Music Label – T-Series

=== Audio credits ===
- Song producer – Aditya Dev
- Electric guitar and banjo – Appai Prachotosh Bhowmick
- Flute – Tejas
- Recorded at Songbird Studios by Anish Gohil
- Mixed and mastered by Eric Pillai

== Cover version ==
"Humnava Mere"

Single by Jubin Nautiyal & Amrita Nayak
- Language: Hindi
- Released: 23 August 2018 (video)
- Genre: Ballad
- Length: 4:00
- Label: T-Series
- Composer: Rocky-Shiv
- Lyricist: Manoj Muntashir

The cover version of the song is sung by Jubin Nautiyal and Amrita Nayak. The cover version was released on 23 August 2018 by T-Series and it has garnered over 7 million views on YouTube as of August 2020.

=== Credits ===
- Song – Humnava Mere
- Singer – Jubin Nautiyal & Amrita Nayak
- Video Editor – Vivek Shevade
- DOP – Vaibbhav Budhiraja
- Camera – Kumar Gaurav

== Acoustic version ==
"Humnava Mere"

Single by Jubin Nautiyal
- Language: Hindi
- Released: 27 November 2018
- Genre: Ballad
- Length: 3:50
- Label: T-Series
- Composer: Rocky-Shiv
- Lyricist: Manoj Muntashir

The acoustic version was sung by Jubin Nautiyal. It was released on 27 November 2018 by T-Series. Jubin Nautiyal said that after making the acoustic version of 'Akh Lad Jaave', he received lots of requests from his fans. Therefore, he also made an acoustic version of 'Humnava Mere' and paid gratitude to his fans. Guitar and Piano are used in this version. It has gained 2.4 million views on YouTube as of February 2025.

=== Credits ===
==== Main credits ====
- Song – Humnava Mere
- Version – Acoustic Version
- Singer – Jubin Nautiyal
- Music – Rocky Shiv
- Lyrics – Manoj Muntashir

==== Audio credits ====
- Piano – Aditya Dev
- Guitar – Mohit Dogra
- Mix & Master – Aditya Dev

==== Video credits ====
- Director: Rocky Khanna
- DOP – Dhiru Bhist
- Editor – Mohan Rathod
- DI Colorist – Manoj Singh
- Production Manager – Manish Joshi

== Track listings ==
Original Version
No.	Title	Length
1.	"Humnava Mere"	6:07

Cover Version
No.	Title	Length
1.	"Humnava Mere"	4:00

Acoustic Version
No.	Title	Length
1.	"Humnava Mere"	3:50

== Release history ==
Country	Date	Format(s)	Version	Label	Ref(s).
India	22 May 2018	Digital download	Original	Super Cassettes Industries Private Limited	
India	23 August 2018	Digital download	Cover	Super Cassettes Industries Private Limited	
India	27 November 2018	Digital download	Acoustic	Super Cassettes Industries Private Limited	
