= Shakeel Azmi =

Indian poet, lyricist and scriptwriter

- Born: 20 April 1971 (age 55); Azamgarh, Uttar Pradesh, India
- Occupations: Lyricist, Poet

Shakeel Azmi (born 20 April 1971) is an Indian lyricist and poet. Born in Azamgarh, India, he writes in Urdu language and is primarily known for his contribution as a film lyricist in Bollywood. Most of his poetry revolves around ghazals, a genre of Urdu poetry.

== Filmography ==
As lyricist

Year	Film	Composer(s)	Notes
2023	Bheed	Anurag Saikia	One song
2022	Anek	Anurag Saikia	One song
2022	Kaun Pravin Tambe?	Anurag Saikia	One song
2022	Atithi Bhooto Bhava	Prasad S.	One song
2022	Middle Class Love	Himesh Reshammiya	Two songs
2021	Mera Fauji Calling	Vijay Verma	One Song
2020	Ateet	Harish Sagane	All songs
2020	Thappad	Anurag Saikia	All songs
2020	Hacked	Jeet Gannguli	One song
2019	Ghost	Nayeem - Sabir	One song
2019	Article 15	Anurag Saikia	Four songs
2018	1921	Harish Sagane	Four songs
2018	Nirdosh	Liyakat Ajmeri	One song
2018	Mulk	Prasad Sashte; Anurag Saikia	All songs
2017	Shaadi Mein Zaroor Aana	Rashid Khan; JAM8	Five songs (Two with Kunaal Vermaa)
2017	The Forest	N/A	
2017	Sweetiee Weds NRI	Raaj Aashoo	One song
2017	Baaraat Company	Ali-Ghani	One song
2017	The House Next Door	Girishh G	One song
2016	Tum Bin II	Ankit Tiwari	Two songs based on the original "Ghazal" by Faaiz Anwar
2015	Luckhnowi ishq	Raaj Aashoo	One song
2015	Ishq Ke Parindey	Vijay Varmaa	Three songs
2014	Zid	Shaarib-Toshi	All songs
2014	Karle Pyaar Karle	Prashant Singh	One song
2014	Ya Rab	Amjad-Nadeem	All songs
2012	1920: Evil Returns	Chirantan Bhatt	Three songs
2011	Haunted – 3D	Chirantan Bhatt	One song
2010	Life Express	Roop Kumar Rathod	All songs
2009	Three – Love, Lies and Betrayal	Chirantan Bhatt	All songs
2009	Trump Card	Lalit Sen	One song
2008	EMI	Chirantan Bhatt	One song
2008	Pehli Nazar Ka Pyaar	Ali-Ghani	One song
2008	Dhoom Dadakka	Roop Kumar Rathod	
2007	Showbiz	Lalit Pandit	
2007	Dhokha	M. M. Kreem	
2006	Woh Lamhe	Roop Kumar Rathod	
2005	Nazar	Roop Kumar Rathod	One song
2005	Zeher	Roop Kumar Rathod	Two songs
2005	Tezaab – The Acid of Love	N/A	
2004	Madhoshi	Roop Kumar Rathod	
2004	Woh Tera Naam Tha	Roop Kumar Rathod	Two songs

== Publications ==
- Shakeel Azmi (2017). Paron Ko Khol. Manjul. ISBN 9788183227957.
- Pokhar Mein Singhaade, Childhood Biography (Poetry Collection) – 2014
- Mitti Mein Aasmaan (Poetry Collection) – 2012
- Khizan Ka Mausam Ruka Hua Hai 9 Poetry Collection – 2010
- Raasta bulata Hai (Poetry Collection) – 2005
- Ashtray (Poetry Collection) – 2000
- Dhoop Dariya (Poetry Collection) – 1996
