= Junaid Wasi =

- Born: Kanpur, India
- Occupations: Film writer and Lyricist,

Junaid Wasi is an Indian film writer and lyricist. He has written Hindi film Commando 3, IB 71 and Gunmaster G9 and lyrics for the notable Hindi film songs and is active as a film writer, dialogue writer and lyricist for Bollywood film songs.

== Career ==
Junaid Wasi was first noticed as a lyricist after the release of the Bollywood song "Uska Hi Banana" from the Horror flick 1920: The Evil Returns in 2012. His lyrics for "Uska Hi Banana" were acclaimed by "komoi". His other notable works are the lyrics of the Hindi song "Baawra Mann" from the film Jolly LLB 2, "Tera Hi Bas Hona Chahoon" from the film Haunted - 3D.

He has written Hindi film Commando 3, IB 71 as dialogue writer, and Gunmaster G9 as screenplay writer , dialogue writer and Lyricist also.

Junaid's another romantic song "Zikr" from the movie Amavas with Asad khan & Arman Malik in 2019.
