= Chirrantan Bhatt =

Indian composer

Chirraantan Bhatt
- Genres: Pop, rock, Bollywood, hip hop, dance, R&B, film score
- Occupations: Composer, music director, singer, instrumentalist, record producer
- Years active: 2008–present

Chirraantan Bhatt is an Indian musician, composer, and singer. He has worked within Bollywood, the Indian film industry, and composed music for Telugu films. He is best known for his melody compositions, particularly in Hindi horror films.

He is a member of the Gujarati Bhatt family, film-makers and directors in Bollywood cinema, and is the grandson of Vijay Bhatt. He is the son of Arun Bhatt, a producer and director of Gujarati films.

Bhatt made his debut as a composer for the Hindi film Mission Istaanbul in 2008. His early career works include music for the films Shaapit, Haunted 3D, and 1920: Evil Returns. His later works include "Har Kisi Ko Nahin Milta" in Akshay Kumar's Boss, "Teri Meri Kahaani" and "Coffee Peete Peete" in Gabbar Is Back, "Bawra Mann" in Jolly LLB 2, and "Uska Hi Banana" in 1920: Evil Returns.

After Gabbar Is Back, the director Krish offered Bhatt the opportunity to score his Telugu venture, Kanche. The score won him two major awards in 2016: the GAMA Award in Dubai and the CineMAA Award in Hyderabad. He was also nominated for Best Music Director for Kanche by the Telugu Filmfare Awards. The film also won the National Award 2016 in the Best Regional Film category.

Bhatt later worked on another period film, Gautamiputra Satakarni, which was also directed by Krish and starred the Telugu actor Nandmuri Balakrishna. Bhatt impressed critics with his music and background score for this film.

In 2018, Bhatt created the music and background score for Nandmuri Balakrishna's film Jai Simha. In particular, his song "Ammakutti Ammakutti" from the film became a hit. Chirrantan Bhatt has been nominated in the best Music Album category for the Filmfare Awards 2020 for his contribution to the Akshay Kumar film Kesari, and he won the Radio Mirchi award for the same. He also composed the music for Nandamuri Balakrishna's Telugu film "Ruler". Bhatt's Telugu film "Bimbisara" was acclaimed by both critics and audience alike. The film had three songs composed by Bhatt - "Eeswarude", "O Tene Palukula" and "Gulebakavali".

Chirraantan Bhatt has given some hit singles out of which Zee Music's "Unglich Ring Daal De" and T-Series's Jubin Nautiyal song "Raabta" are hugely popular.

== Discography ==
| Year | Movie | Notes |
|---|---|---|
| 2022 | Bimbisara | Composed three songs: "Eeswarude", "O Tene Palukula" and "Gulebakavali" |
| 2022 | Rashtra Kavach Om | Composed two songs: "Saansain Dene Aana" and "Saasein Bhaari Hain" |
| 2021 | Sanak | composed two songs: "O Yara Dil Lagana" and "Aankhen Mili" |
| 2019 | Ruler | Telugu |
| 2019 | Kesari | Composed one song "Ajj Singh Garjega" |
| 2018 | Jai Simha | Telugu film, composed album and background score |
| 2017 | Jolly LLB 2 | Composed one song "Bawra Mann" |
| 2017 | Gautamiputra Satakarni | Telugu film, composed album and background score |
| 2015 | Kanche | Telugu film, composed album and background score |
| 2015 | Gabbar is Back | Composed two songs"Teri Meri Kahaani" and "Coffee Peetey Peetey" |
| 2014 | Ragini MMS 2 | Composed one track, "Lori of Death" |
| 2013 | Boss | Composed two songs "Har Kisi Ko" and "Har Kisi Ko (Reprise)" |
| 2013 | Ishk Actually | Composed three tracks "Aye Dil Bata", "Lucky Tonight", "Injar Pinjar" |
| 2013 | Ankur Arora Murder Case | Composed album |
| 2013 | Zanjeer | Two tracks, Hindi- "Mumbai Ke Hero", "Lamha Tera Mera" and Telugu- "Mumbai Ke Hero", "Preminchaa.." |
| 2012 | 1920: Evil Returns | Composed album |
| 2011 | Haunted – 3D | Composed album |
| 2010 | Shaapit | Composed album |
| 2010 | Allah Ke Banday | Composed two tracks |
| 2010 | Hide & Seek | Composed one track |
| 2009 | Three: Love, Lies, Betrayal | Composed album |
| 2008 | EMI: Liya Hai To Chukana Padega | Composed album |
| 2008 | Mission Istaanbul | Composed two songs "Mission Mission", "Nobody Like You" |
