= List of songs recorded by Arijit Singh =

Indian singer discography

Songs of Arijit Singh
Playback singer
Hindi songs	560
Bengali songs	143
Telugu songs	25
Tamil songs	4
Marathi songs	4
Kannada songs	2
Malayalam songs	1
Gujarati songs	1
Assamese songs	1
Punjabi songs	1
Total	742

Composer
Hindi songs	22
Bengali songs	6
Total	28

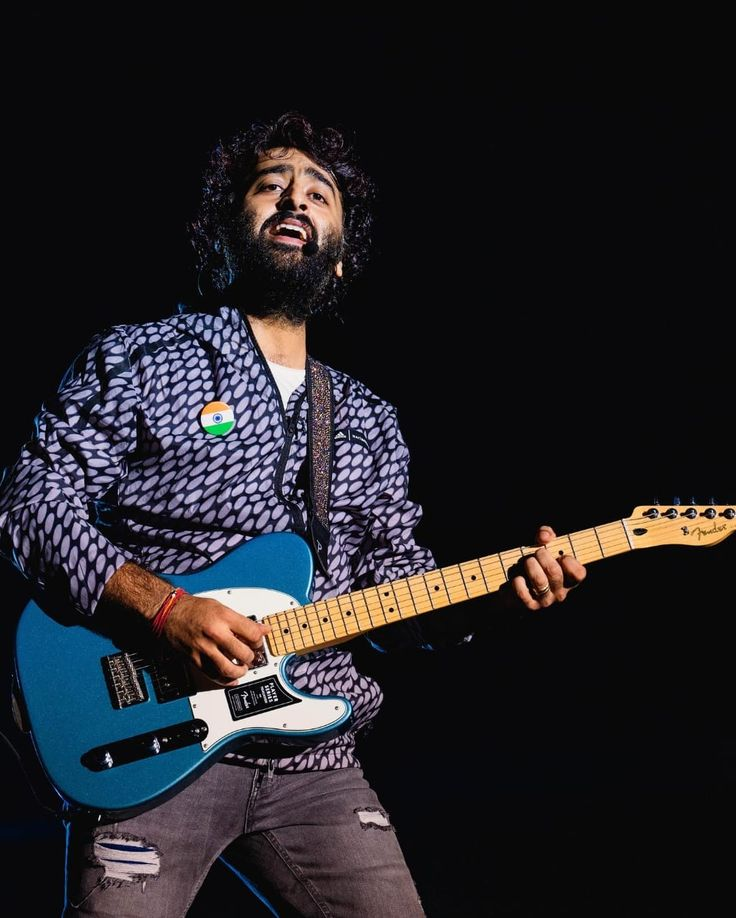
Arijit Singh performing in Mauritius in 2023.

Arijit Singh made his Bollywood debut with Mithoon-composition, "Phir Mohabbat" from Murder 2, which was recorded in 2009 though released in 2011. The following year, he worked with Pritam for four of his films. He rendered four versions of the song "Raabta" in Agent Vinod. He also lent his voice for Chirantan Bhatt in 1920: Evil Returns and for Vishal–Shekhar in Shanghai, where the song "Duaa" from the latter fetched him Mirchi Music Award for Upcoming Male Playback Singer award and was nominated in the same category for "Phir Le Aya Dil" from Barfi!.

Singh rose to widespread prominence with the release of the song "Tum Hi Ho" from Aashiqui 2 (2013). The song fetched him several awards and nominations including his first Filmfare Awards. He worked with Jeet Gannguli for the rest of his tracks in the album. He further allied with Pritam, singing three tracks for Yeh Jawaani Hai Deewani. The duo collaborated with Shahid Kapoor, performing "Main Rang Sharbaton Ka" and "Dhokha Dhadi". Moreover, he dubbed for Shah Rukh Khan in the song "Kashmir Main Tu Kanyakumari" which was composed by Vishal–Shekhar. Apart from rendering the duet version of "Har Kisi Ko", the year marks his first collaboration with Sharib–Toshi and Sanjay Leela Bhansali by singing the song "Kabhi Jo Baadal Barse" for the former and the semi-classical number, "Laal Ishq" for the latter.

In 2014, Singh worked with Sajid–Wajid for the first time, performing two tracks of Main Tera Hero and the song "Raat Bhar". He rendered three re-mixed songs; Amit Trivedi's "Hungama Ho Gaya", Sharib–Toshi's "Samjhawan" and Arko Pravo Mukherjee's "Aaj Phir". The year marks his first collaboration with Vishal Bhardwaj, Tony Kakkar, Palak Muchhal, A. R. Rahman and Sachin–Jigar. During the year, he sang "Humdard", "Manwa Laage", "Sun Le Zara", "Sajde", two songs of Zid and three tracks of Holiday, to name a few. Gannguli-composed Muskurane garnered him most nominations from the year, while he received two Filmfare nominations for Suno Na Sangemarmar and the Sufi song Mast Magan. He has also recorded a Gujarati track, Satrangi Re from the movie Wrong Side Raju .

In 2015, Singh made his Tamil debut with the song "Neeye Vaazhkai Enben" from the film Pugazh. From the film Roy he sang "Sooraj Dooba Hain". Composed by Amaal Mallik and penned by Kumaar, it won him his 2nd Filmfare Award. He also sang "Agar Tum Saath Ho" with Alka Yagnik, from the movie Tamasha which is composed by A. R. Rahman and written by Irshad Kamil. From Khamoshiyan he sang the title track and two other songs. He also sang the title track of Hamari Adhuri Kahani for Jeet Ganguli. Besides working with Chirantan Bhatt on "Teri Meri Kahaani" and Sachin–Jigar on "Chunar", he also lent his voice to "Saware" from Phantom. Arijit was the lead vocalist on the soundtrack of the film Dilwale. He sang "Janam Janam" and "Gerua" with Antara Mitra and the dance number "Tukur Tukur".

In 2016, he made his Gujarati debut with the song "Satrangi Re" from the film Wrong Side Raju. He sang "Soch Na Sake" from Airlift, "Sanam Re" - the title track of the movie Sanam Re, composed and written by Mithoon and "Yeh Fitoor Mera" written by Swanand Kirkire and composed by Amit Trivedi from Fitoor. He was the key vocalist in the movies Raaz Reboot and Ae Dil Hai Mushkil. From Raaz Reboot he sang "Lo Maan Liya", the mellow melody "Raaz Aakhein Teri" and "Yaad Hain Na". He rendered "Channa Mereya" and "Ae Dil Hai Mushkil" from Ae Dil Hai Mushkil. Singh delivered another chartbuster hit "Nashe Si Chadh Gayi" from Befikre. He performed "Naina" from Dangal, composed by Pritam and penned by Amitabh Bhattacharya.

In 2017, he sang the romantic duet "Zaalima" from the movie Raees. He lent his voice for "Roke Na Ruke Naina", composed by Amaal Mallik from the film Badrinath Ki Dulhania and the love ballad "Phir Bhi Tumko Chaahunga", composed by Mithoon, with lyrics by Manoj Muntashir from Half Girlfriend. He was the lead vocalist on the film Raabta singing "Ik Vaari Aa", composed by Pritam, lyrics are penned by Amitabh Bhattacharya. Singh was the lead singer of the Jagga Jasoos Soundtrack singing "Ullu ka Pattha", "Galti Se Mistake", "Jhumri Talaiyya" and also "Phir Wahi". All songs have been composed by Pritam and written by Amitabh Bhattacharya. He also sang "Hawayein" from Jab Harry Met Sejal.

In 2018, he sang "Binte Dil" for the film Padmaavat written by A. M. Turaz and composed by Sanjay Leela Bhansali. It fetched him National Film Award for Best Male Playback Singer. From the movie Kedarnath, he sang "Jaan Nissar" and a duet song "Qaafirana" with Nikhita Gandhi, both the songs composed by Amit Trivedi and lyrics penned by Amitabh Bhattacharya. In 2019, his song "Ve Maahi" with Asees Kaur from film Kesari composed by Tanishk Bagchi was released. He sang "First Class" with Neeti Mohan and title song "Kalank" from film Kalank composed by Pritam Chakraborty and penned by Amitabh Bhattacharya. "Kalank" earned him his sixth Filmfare Award and fifth in a row. He rendered "Khairiyat" from the film Chhichhore. His song "Tujhe Kitna Chahne Lage hum" from Kabir Singh in 2019. In October his song "Ghungroo" with Shilpa Rao was released from the movie, War. In 2020, he sang three songs released from the film Love Aaj Kal : "Shayad", "Haan Tum Ho" and "Haan Main Galat". Singh released his first single "Rihaa" also sang the songs "Aabaad Barbaad" and "Hardum Humdum" from Ludo, besides many others.

In 2021, he composed music for a film for the first time in Pagglait under his banner Oriyon Music. He sang "Tumse Bhi Zyada" from the movie Tadap, composed by Pritam and lyrics penned by Irshad Kamil. Singh also lent his voice for the song "Mere Yaara" from 83 and "Rait Zara Si" from Atrangi Re. In 2022, he sang "Kesariya" and a duet "Deva Deva" with Jonita Gandhi from the movie Brahmāstra. "Kesariya" earned him his seventh Filmfare Award and it also became the first Indian song to cross 300 million and 400 million streams on Spotify. His song "Kitni Haseen Hogi" composed by Mithoon was released from the movie HIT: The First Case. He sang "Apna Bana Le", composed by Sachin-Jigar from Bhediya. Singh's version of "Mere Dholna" and a duet song "Hum Nashe Mein Toh Nahin" with Tulsi Kumar were released from Bhool Bhulaiyaa 2.

In Bengali, he has also delivered a number of chartbusters including "Ureche Mon", "Abar Phire Ele", "Keu Jaane Na", "Bhalobashar Morshum", "Mon Majhi Re", "Bojhena Shey Bojhena" and "Tomake Chai".

== Bengali songs ==
=== 2009 ===
TV Series/Album	No.	Song	Composer(s)	Writer(s)	Co-singer(s)	Note
Dadagiri Unlimited	1	"Dadagiri"	Arijit Singh			

=== 2011 ===
Film	No	Song	Composer(s)	Writer(s)	Co-Singer(s)	Ref.	Note
Egaro	1	"Amader Surya Merun"	Mayukh-Moinak	Sumanta Choudhury	Avik		
Egaro	2	"E Sudhu Khela Noy Songram"	Mayukh-Moinak	Sumanta Choudhury	Avik, Goutam		

=== 2012 ===
Film	No	Song	Composer(s)	Writer(s)	Co-Singer(s)	Ref.	Note
3 Kanya	3	"Golemale"	Indraadip Das Gupta	Srijato	Monali Thakur		
Bojhena Shey Bojhena	4	"Bojhena Shey Bojhena"	Indraadip Das Gupta	Prasen			
Bojhena Shey Bojhena	5	"Na Re Na"	Arindam Chatterjee	Prasen			
Bojhena Shey Bojhena	6	"Sajna" (Reprise Version)	Arindam Chatterjee	Prasen			
Bojhena Shey Bojhena	7	"Bhogoban 2.0"	Arindam Chatterjee	Prasen	Somlata		

=== 2013 ===
Film	No	Song	Composer(s)	Writer(s)	Co-Singer(s)	Ref.	Note
Kanamachi	8	"Mon Baware"	Indraadip Das Gupta	Prosen	Timir Biswas, Ujjaini Mukherjee, Anweshaa		
Hawa Bodol	9	"Din Khon Mapa Ache"	Indraadip Das Gupta	Prosen			
Hawa Bodol	10	"Mone Porle"	Indraadip Das Gupta	Angshuman Chakraborty			
Hawa Bodol	11	"Bhoy Dekhas Na" (Male Version)	Indraadip Das Gupta	Angshuman Chakraborty			
Mrs. Sen	12	"Chupi Chupi"	Indraadip Das Gupta	Rabindranath Tagore (Additional by Srijato)			
Mrs. Sen	13	"Ghar Aaja" (Version 1)	Indraadip Das Gupta	Rabindranath Tagore (Additional by Srijato)			
Mrs. Sen	14	"Ghar Aaja" (Version 2)	Indraadip Das Gupta	Rabindranath Tagore (Additional by Srijato)			
C/O Sir	15	"Theme Jai"	Raja Narayan Deb	Srijato			
Boss	16	"Mon Majhi Re"	Jeet Gannguli	Prosen			
Boss	17	"Eeche Joto"	Jeet Gannguli	Chandrani Ganguly	Monali Thakur		
Proloy	18	"Roshni Elo"	Indraadip Das Gupta	Srijato	Anweshaa		
Proloy	19	"Ghoom Paranir Gaan"	Indraadip Das Gupta	Srijato			
Bangla Naache Bhangra	20	"College Song"	Arindom Chatterjee	Prosen			
Rangbaaz	21	"Ki Kore Toke Bolbo"	Jeet Gannguli	Prosen			
Rangbaaz	22	"Beche Theke Labh Ki Bol"	Jeet Gannguli	Prosen			
Mishawr Rawhoshyo	23	"Balir Shohor"	Indraadip Das Gupta	Srijato	Shreya Ghoshal		
Mishawr Rawhoshyo	24	"Dilli"	Indraadip Das Gupta	Srijato	Shadab Faridi		
Majnu	25	"O Piya Re Piya"	Savvy	Prosen	June Banerjee		
Hanuman.com	26	"Chal Chal Chal"	Indraadip Das Gupta	Gaurav Pandey			
Chander Pahar	27	"Chander Pahar"	Indraadip Das Gupta	Srijato			

TV Series/Album	No.	Song	Composer(s)	Writer(s)	Co-singer(s)	Note
Tomay Amay Mile	2	"Tomaye Amaye Mile"	Indraadip Das Gupta	Prasen	Ujjaini Mukherjee	
Bojhena Se Bojhena	3	"Bojhena Se Bojhena"	Indraadip Das Gupta	Prasen		Female Version: Sung by Madhuraa Bhattacharya (unlike the movie version which featured Prashmita Paul)

=== 2014 ===
Film	No	Song	Composer(s)	Writer(s)	Co-Singer(s)	Ref.	Note
Bangali Babu English Mem	28	"O Re Mon Udashi"	Dabbu & Rishi	Prosen			
Obhishopto Nighty	29	"Sadher Nighty"	Indraadip Das Gupta	Srijato	Mohan Kannan, Samidh Mukherjee, Indraadip Das Gupta		
Chirodini Tumi Je Amar 2	30	"Eka Ekela Mon" (Male Version)	Jeet Gannguli	Prosen			
Chirodini Tumi Je Amar 2	31	"Mon Bojhena"	Jeet Gannguli	Prosen			
Teen Patti	32	"O Fakira"	Indraadip Das Gupta	Srijato			
Teen Patti	33	"Kete Gechey Din"	Indraadip Das Gupta	Srijato	Madhuraa Bhattacharya		
Apur Panchali	34	"Apur Paayer Chaap"	Indraadip Das Gupta	Kaushik Ganguly			
Game	35	"Ore Manwa Re"	Jeet Gannguli	Prosen	Akriti Kakkar		
Golpo Holeo Shotti	36	"Ei Bhalo Ei Kharap"	Indraadip Das Gupta	Prosen	Monali Thakur		
Golpo Holeo Shotti	37	"Ei Bhalo Ei Kharap" (Male Version)	Indraadip Das Gupta	Prosen			
Golpo Holeo Shotti	38	"Piya Bina"	Indraadip Das Gupta	Prosen			
Highway	39	"Khela Sesh"	Anupam Roy	Anupam Roy			
Borbaad	40	"Parbo Na"	Arindom Chatterjee	Prosen	Prashmita Paul		
Borbaad	41	"Ashona"	Arindom Chatterjee	Prosen	Prashmita Paul		
Borbaad	42	"Raja Rani (Revisited)"	Arindom Chatterjee	Prosen	Prashmita Paul		
Borbaad	43	"Parbona (Revisited)"	Arindom Chatterjee	Prosen			
Hercules	44	"Boba Rajkumar"	Arijit Singh	Prosen			
Yoddha	45	"Sharatadin"	Indraadip Das Gupta	Srijato	Anweshaa		
Yoddha	46	"Aami Tomar Kache"	Indraadip Das Gupta	Prosen			
Khaad	47	"Aami Achi"	Indraadip Das Gupta	Srijato			
Khaad	48	"Asadoma Sadgamayo"	Indraadip Das Gupta	Srijato			

TV Series/Album	No.	Song	Composer(s)	Writer(s)	Co-singer(s)	Note
Atlético de Kolkata	4	"Fatafati Football"	Arindam Chatterjee	Prasen		
Suruchi Sangha Puja Anthem	5	"Jaago Maa"	Jeet Gannguli	Chandrani Gannguli		
Let There Be Light (Arijit NGO)	6	"Laal Neel Holud Sobuj"	Arijit Singh			

=== 2015 ===
Film	No	Song	Composer(s)	Writer(s)	Co-Singer(s)	Ref.	Note
Lorai: Play to Live	49	"Kichu Kichu Kotha"	Indraadip Das Gupta	Prosen	Kaushiki Chakrabarty		
Lorai: Play to Live	50	"Mayar Jibon Jonaki"	Indraadip Das Gupta	Prosen			
Herogiri	51	"Ke Tui Bol"	Jeet Gannguli	Raja Chanda			
Amanush 2	52	"Keno"	Arindam Chatterjee	Prosen			
Asche Bochor Abar Hobe	53	"Chine Phelechhi Rastaghat"	Indraadip Das Gupta	Prosen	Anweshaa		
Roga Howar Sohoj Upaye	54	"Wrong Number"	Indraadip Das Gupta	Prosen			
Roga Howar Sohoj Upaye	55	"Thikana Lekha Nei"	Indraadip Das Gupta	Prosen			
Besh Korechi Prem Korechi	56	"Tor Ek Kothaye"	Jeet Gannguli	Prosen			
Parbona Ami Chartey Tokey	57	"Parbona Ami Chartey Tokey"	Indraadip Das Gupta	Prosen			
Katmundu	58	"Aami Raaji"	Anupam Roy	Anupam Roy	Anupam Roy		
Shudhu Tomari Jonyo	59	"Egiye De"	Arindam Chatterjee	Prosen	Madhubanti Bagchi		
Shudhu Tomari Jonyo	60	"Egiye De Reprise"	Arindam Chatterjee	Prosen			
Shudhu Tomari Jonyo	61	"Emotional Saiyaan"	Arindam Chatterjee	Prosen	Shalmali Kholgade, Bob		
Shudhu Tomari Jonyo	62	"Shudhu Tomari Jonyo" (Title Track)	Indraadip Das Gupta	Prosen	Shreya Ghoshal		
Abby Sen	63	"Moneri Majhe Jeno"	Joy Sarkar	Suchandra Chowdhury			

TV Series/Album	No.	Song	Composer(s)	Writer(s)	Co-singer(s)	Note
Stories by Rabindranath Tagore	7	"Amar Parano Jaha Chaye"	Rabindranath Tagore (Recreated by Rana Mazumder)	Rabindranath Tagore		

=== 2016 ===
Film	No	Song	Composer(s)	Writer(s)	Co-Singer(s)	Ref.	Note
Bastu Shaap	64	"Tomake Chuey Dilam" (Male Version)	Indraadip Das Gupta	Srijato			
Cinemawala	65	"Phiriye Dao Cinemahall"	Indraadip Das Gupta	Kaushik Ganguly			
Shikari	66	"Ar Kono Kotha Na Bole"	Indraadip Das Gupta	Prosen	Madhubanti Bagchi		
Shikari	67	"Momo Chittey" (Duet Version)	Indraadip Das Gupta	Rabindranath Tagore	Madhuraa Bhattacharya		
Shikari	68	"Mamo Chittey"	Indraadip Das Gupta	Rabindranath Tagore			
Chocolate	69	"Saat Sagor"	Indraadip Das Gupta	Srijato			
Gangster	70	"Thik Emon Ebhabe"	Arindom Chatterjee	Prosen			
Gangster	71	"Tomake Chai"	Arindom Chatterjee	Prosen			
Haripada Bandwala	72	"Bojhabo Ki Kore"	Indraadip Das Gupta	Prosen	Anweshaa		

=== 2017 ===
Film	No	Song	Composer(s)	Writer(s)	Co-Singer(s)	Ref.	Note
Tomake Chai	73	"Tomake Chai"	Indraadip Das Gupta	Prasen			
Tomake Chai	74	"Bhalolaage Tomake"	Indraadip Das Gupta	Prasen	Anweshaa		
Devi	75	"Hariye Jai"	Savvy	Prasen			
One	76	"Jodi Bolo"	Arindom Chatterjee	Prasen			
Ami Je Ke Tomar	77	"Eshe Gechi Kacha Kachi"	Indraadip Das Gupta	Prasen	Antara Mitra, Aditi Paul		
Boss 2	78	"Ureche Mon"	Jeet Gannguli	Pranjal			
Chaamp	79	"Maula Re"	Jeet Gannguli	Anindya Chatterjee			
Chaya O Chobi	80	"Eh Kancha"	Indraadip Das Gupta	Kaushik Ganguly	Mainak Nandy		
Bolo Dugga Maiki	81	"Dugga Maa"	Arindom Chatterjee	Priyo Chattopadhyay, Raja Chanda, Prasen			
Bolo Dugga Maiki	82	"Tomar Dyakha Naai"	Arindom Chatterjee	Prasen			
Cockpit	83	"Bhalobasa Jaak"	Arindom Chatterjee	Prasen	Somlata Acharyya Chowdhury		
Cockpit	84	"Khela Sesh"	Arindom Chatterjee	Kaushik Ganguly			
Cockpit	85	"Khela Sesh Revisited"	Arindom Chatterjee	Kaushik Ganguly			
Yeti Obhijaan	86	"Kakababur Obhijan"	Indraadip Das Gupta	Prasen	Anupam Roy, Rupam Islam		
Dhaka Attack	87	"Tup Tap"	Arindom Chatterjee	Anindya Chatterjee	Somlata Acharyya Chowdhury		
Samantaral	88	"Tui Chunli Jakhan"	Indraadip Das Gupta	Dipangshu	Shreya Ghoshal		
Samantaral	89	"Ei Mon"	Indraadip Das Gupta	Srijato			
Amazon Obhijaan	90	"Chol Naa Jai"	Indraadip Das Gupta	Prasen			

=== 2018 ===
Film	No	Song	Composer(s)	Writer(s)	Co-Singer(s)	Ref.	Note
Ka Kha Ga Gha	91	"Naam Na Jana Pakhi" (Male Version)	Anindya Chatterjee	Anindya Chatterjee			
Ka Kha Ga Gha	92	"Naam Na Jana Pakhi" (Duet Version)	Anindya Chatterjee	Anindya Chatterjee	Shreya Ghoshal		
Kabir	93	"Akasheo Alpo Neel"	Indraadip Das Gupta	Srijato			
Fidaa	94	"Hoye Jetey Paari"	Arindam Chatterjee	Prasen			
Fidaa	95	"Hoye Jetey Paari" (Revisited)	Arindam Chatterjee	Prasen			
Ek Je Chhilo Raja	96	"Ke Ami Kothay"	Indraadip Das Gupta	Srijato			
Adventures Of Jojo	97	"Jojor Gaan"	Indraadip Das Gupta	Srijato			

=== 2019 ===
Film	No	Song	Composer(s)	Writer(s)	Co-Singer(s)	Ref.	Note
Bijoya	98	"Tomar Pasher Desh"	Indraadip Das Gupta	Kaushik Ganguly			
Bornoporichoy	99	"Bishonno Chimney"	Anupam Roy	Anupam Roy			
Gotro	100	"Maa"	Anindya Chattopadhyay	Anindya Chattopadhyay			

TV Series/Album	No.	Song	Composer(s)	Writer(s)	Co-singer(s)	Note
East Bengal	8	"Eksho Bochor"	Arindam Chatterjee	Raja Chanda, Prasen		

As a Background score composer:

- Kedara (2019)

=== 2020 ===
Film	No	Song	Composer(s)	Writer(s)	Co-Singer(s)	Ref.	Note
Dwitiyo Purush	101	"Abar Phire Ele"	Anupam Roy	Anupam Roy			
Love Aaj Kal Porshu	102	"Aye Dekhe Jaa"	Arindam Chatterjee	Prasen			
Tiki-Taka	103	"Nouka Dile Na"	Nabarun Bose	Rohan Ghose			

TV Series/Album	No.	Song	Composer(s)	Writer(s)	Co-singer(s)	Note
Mukto Kore Dao	9	"Mukto Kore Dao"	Arijit Singh			
Ore Nutan Juger Bhore	10	"Ore Nutan Juger Bhore"	Rabindranath Tagore (Recreated by Arijit Singh)	Rabindranath Tagore		

=== 2021 ===
Film	No	Song	Composer(s)	Writer(s)	Co-Singer(s)	Ref.	Note
Ei Ami Renu	104	"Chol Choley Jaai"	Rana Mazumder	Rana Mazumder	Shreya Ghoshal		

TV Series/Album	No.	Song	Composer(s)	Writer(s)	Co-singer(s)	Note
Amra Chas Kori Anonde	11	"Amra Chas Kori Anonde"	Rabindranath Tagore (Recreated by Arijit Singh)	Rabindranath Tagore		
He Sokha	12	"He Sokha"				

=== 2022 ===
Film	No	Song	Composer(s)	Writer(s)	Co-Singer(s)	Ref.	Note
8/12 Binay Badal Dinesh	105	"Swadhin Hobe Desh"	Soumya Rit	Soumya Rit			
Raavan	106	"Keu Jaane Na"	Savvy Gupta	Prosen			
Kishmish	107	"Oboseshe"	Nilayan Chatterjee	Nilayan Chatterjee			
X=Prem	108	"Bhalobashar Morshum" (Male Version)	Saptak Sanai	Barish			
X=Prem	109	"Bhalobashar Morshum" (Duet)	Saptak Sanai	Barish	Shreya Ghoshal		
Bismillah	110	"Bismillah Title Track"	Indraadip Dasgupta	Srijato			
Bismillah	111	"Aajke Raatey"	Indraadip Dasgupta	Srijato			

TV Series/Album	No.	Song	Composer(s)	Writer(s)	Co-singer(s)	Note
Shorir Jure	13	"Shorir Jure"	Debojyoti Mishra	Somchanda Bhattacharya		(Recorded in 2013, Released in 2022)

=== 2023 ===
Film	No	Song	Composer(s)	Writer(s)	Co-Singer(s)	Ref.	Note
Manobjomin	112	"Mon Re Krishikaj"	Joy Sarkar	Ramprasad Sen	Shreya Ghoshal		
Chengiz	113	"Ebhabe Ke Daake"	Kaushik-Guddu	Prosen			
Biye Bibhrat	114	"Jiya Tui Chara"	Ranajoy Bhattacharjee	Barish			
Biye Bibhrat	115	"Ghono Megher"	Ranajoy Bhattacharjee	Barish	Ashmita Kar		
Biye Bibhrat	116	“Nei Khoti Nei”	Ranajoy Bhattacharjee	Barish	Snigdhajit Bhowmik		
Dawshom Awbotaar	117	"Baundule Ghuri"	Anupam Roy	Anupam Roy	Shreya Ghoshal		
Bagha Jatin	118	"Ashbo Phire"	Nilayan Chatterjee	Nilayan Chatterjee			
Ektu Sore Bosun	119	"Nispolok"	Ranajoy Bhattacharjee	Ranajoy Bhattacharjee	Anweshaa		
Kabuliwala	120	"Bhaabo Jodi"	Indraadip Das Gupta	Anirban Bhattacharya			

TV Series/Album	No.	Song	Composer(s)	Writer(s)	Co-singer(s)	Note
Eto Kiser Tara	14	"Eto Kiser Tara"	Sunny M.R.	Arijit Singh		
Kolkata International Film Festival Theme Song	15	"Kolkata International Film Festival Theme Song"	Indradip Dasgupta	Srijato		

=== 2024 ===
Film	No	Song	Composer(s)	Writer(s)	Co-Singer(s)	Ref.	Note
Ajogyo	121	"Keu Janbe Na"	Indraadip Das Gupta	Kaushik Ganguly			
Padatik	122	"Tu Zinda Hain"	Salil Chaudhury	Shailendra	Sonu Nigam		

TV Series/Album	No.	Song	Composer(s)	Writer(s)	Co-singer(s)	Note
Din Chole Jaye	16	"Din Chole Jaye"	Ananjan Chakraborty	Srijato		
Aar Kobe	17	"Aar Kobe"	Arijit Singh			In Protest of incident happened on RG Kar Hospital

=== 2025 ===
Film	No	Song	Composer(s)	Writer(s)	Co-Singer(s)	Ref.	Note
Grihapravesh	123	"Golpo Holo Shuru"	Indraadip Das Gupta	Prasen	Shreya Ghoshal, Armaan Rashid Khan		
Dhumketu	124	"Gaane Gaane"	Anupam Roy	Anupam Roy	Shreya Ghoshal		
Bela	125	"Boba Raat"	Ranajoy Bhattacharjee	Tamoghna Chatterjee			
Lawho Gouranger Naam Rey	126	"Khawne Gorachand, Khawne Kaala"	Indraadip Das Gupta	Ritam Sen			

== Telugu songs ==
Year.	Film	No	Song	Composer(s)	Writer(s)	Co-Singer(s)	Note
2010	Kedi	1	"Neeve Na Neeve Na"	Sandeep Chowta	Chinni Charan	Neha Kakkar	
2013	Swamy Ra Ra	2	"Krishnundi Varasulantha"	Sunny M.R.	Krishna Chaitanya		
2013	Swamy Ra Ra	3	"Adi Enti Okkasari"	Sunny M.R.	Krishna Chaitanya		
2013	Swamy Ra Ra	4	"Edu Vaadu Evado Ledu"	Sunny M.R.	Krishna Chaitanya		
2013	Uyyala Jampala	5	"Dher Tak Chala"	Sunny M.R.	Ashish Pandit		
2013	Nuvve Naa Bangaram	6	"Okariki Okaram"	Vinod Yajamanya	Anantha Sriram		
2014	Manam	7	"Kanulanu Thaake"	Anup Rubens	Vanamali		
2014	Nee Jathaga Nenundali	8	"Pranama Naa Pranama"	Mithoon	Chandra Bose		
2014	Nee Jathaga Nenundali	9	"Manase Pedavina"	Mithoon	Chandra Bose	Arpita Chakraborty	
2014	Rowdy Fellow	10	"Ra Ra Rowdy"	Sunny M.R.	Krishna Chaitanya	Aditi Singh Sharma	
2014	Rowdy Fellow	11	"Aa Seetadevi Navvula"	Sunny M.R.	Krishna Chaitanya		
2015	Dohchay	12	"Nacchite Ye Panaina"	Sunny M.R.	Krishna Kanth		
2015	Dohchay	13	"Hayi Hayi"	Sunny M.R.	Krishna Kanth		
2015	Dohchay	14	"Raanaa"	Sunny M.R.	Krishna Kanth		
2015	Dohchay	15	"He is Mr. Mosagadu"	Sunny M.R.	Krishna Kanth		
2015	Bhale Manchi Roju	16	"Ningi Needera"	Sunny M.R.	Krishna Kanth		
2015	Bhale Manchi Roju	17	"Evari Roopo"	Sunny M.R.	Krishna Kanth		
2015	Thanu Nenu	18	"Suryudne Chusoddhama"	Sunny M.R.	Vasu Valaboju	Harshika Gudi	
2015	Thanu Nenu	19	"Nuvu Thodu Vunte Lokam"	Sunny M.R.	Vasu Valaboju		
2017	Keshava	20	"Yedisthe Rarevaru"	Sunny M.R.	Krishna Chaitanya		
2017	Keshava	21	"Po Poradi"	Sunny M.R.	Krishna Chaitanya		
2018	Naa Peru Surya	22	"Maya"	Vishal–Shekhar	Ramajogayya Sastry	Ramya Behara	
2018	Husharu	23	"Nuvve Nuvve"	Sunny M.R.	Krishna Kanth		
2022	Brahmāstra: Part One – Shiva	24	"Deva Deva (Telugu)"	Pritam	Chandrabose	Sreerama Chandra, Jonita Gandhi	
2024	Om Bheem Bush	25	"Anuvanuvu"	Sunny M.R.	Krishna Kanth		

== Tamil songs ==
Year.	Film	No	Song	Composer(s)	Writer(s)	Co-Singer(s)	Note
2016	Pugazh	1	"Neeyae" (Adada Enna Azhagu Reprise)	Vivek-Mervin	Na.Muthukumar	Mervin Solomon	
2016	Pugazh	2	"Adada Enna Azhagu"	Vivek-Mervin	Na.Muthukumar	Mervin Solomon	
2016	24	3	"Naan Un Azhaginile"	A. R. Rahman	Madhan Karky	Chinmayi	
2022	Brahmāstra: Part One – Shiva	4	"Deva Deva (Tamil)"	Pritam	Madhan Karky	Sid Sriram, Jonita Gandhi	

== Malayalam songs ==
Year	Film	No	Song	Composer(s)	Writer(s)	Co-Singer(s)	Note
2022	Brahmāstra: Part One – Shiva	1	"Deva Deva (Malayalam)"	Pritam	Shabareesh Varma	Hesham Abdul Wahab, Arya Dhayal	

== Kannada songs ==
Year.	Film	No	Song	Composer(s)	Writer(s)	Co-Singer(s)	Note
2014	Ninnindale	1	"Mouna Thalithe"	Mani Sharma	Jayanth Kaikini		
2022	Brahmāstra: Part One – Shiva	2	"Deva Deva (Kannada)"	Pritam	Hridaya Shiva	Sanjith Hegde, Jonita Gandhi	

== Marathi songs ==
Year.	Film	No	Song	Composer(s)	Writer(s)	Co-Singer(s)	Note
2015	Katyar Kaljat Ghusali	1	"Yaar Illahi – Qawwali"	Shankar–Ehsaan–Loy	Sameer Samant	Arshad Muhammad, Divya Kumar	
2015	Katyar Kaljat Ghusali	2	"Bhola Bhandari"	Shankar–Ehsaan–Loy	Mangesh Kangane	Shivam Mahadevan	
2020	Bhaybheet	3	"Salte"	Nakash Aziz	Mandar Cholkar		
2020	Bhaybheet	4	"Salte" (Reprise)	Nakash Aziz	Mandar Cholkar		

== Gujarati songs ==
Year.	Film	No	Song	Composer(s)	Writer(s)	Co-Singer(s)	Note
2016	Wrong Side Raju	1	"Satrangi Re"	Sachin–Jigar	Niren Bhatt	Dawn Cordo	

== Assamese Songs ==
Year.	Film	No	Song	Composer(s)	Writer(s)	Co-Singer(s)	Note
2013	Shinyor	1	"Gumutha"	Anurag Saikia	Manas Mahanta		

== Punjabi Songs ==
Year.	Film	No	Song	Composer(s)	Writer(s)	Co-Singer(s)	Note
2025	Akaal: The Unconquered	1	"Ik Vaada"	Shankar Ehsaan Loy	Happy Raikoti		

== As composer ==
=== Film songs ===
Year	Film	Song	Co-Singer(s)/Singer(s)	Writer(s)	Ref.	Note
2021	Pagglait	"Pagglait"	Raftaar, Amrita Singh	Raftaar		
2021	Pagglait	"Phire Faqeera"	Raja Kumari, Amrita Singh	Neelesh Misra		
2021	Pagglait	"Dil Udd Ja Re"	Neeti Mohan, Sunny M.R.	Neelesh Misra		
2021	Pagglait	"Dil Udd Ja Re" (Revisited)	Meghna Mishra	Neelesh Misra		
2021	Pagglait	"Thode Kam Ajnabi"	Himani Kapoor	Neelesh Misra		
2021	Pagglait	"Thode Kam Ajnabi" (Reprise Version)	Himani Kapoor	Neelesh Misra		
2021	Pagglait	"Lamha"	Antara Mitra	Neelesh Misra		
2021	Pagglait	"Lamha" (Reprise)	Sumana Banerjee	Neelesh Misra		
2021	Pagglait	"Lamha" (Revisited)	Antara Mitra	Neelesh Misra		
2021	Pagglait	"Pagal"	Raja Kumari, Amrita Singh	Neelesh Misra		
2021	Pagglait	"Meera's Poem"	Jhumpa Mondal	Neelesh Misra		
2021	Pagglait	"Radha's Poem"	Chinmayi Sripada	Neelesh Misra		

=== Non-film songs ===
Year	Album	Song	Singer(s)	Writer(s)
2020	Rihaa	"Rihaa"	Arijit Singh	Shloke Lal
2021	Jaanein Bachayenge	"Jaanein Bachayenge"	Arijit Singh	Neelesh Misra
2022	Deh Shiva	"Deh Shiva"	Arijit Singh, MC Mawali (Rap), Kiraat Singh (Child voice)	Shloke Lal
2022	Yaadein Wohi	"Yaadein Wohi"	Arijit Singh	
2022	Patriot	"Patriot"	Arijit Singh	
2023	Barkhaa	"Barkhaa"	Sunidhi Chauhan	Irshad Kamil
2023	Bhide	"Bhide"	Arijit Singh, Divine	Amitabh Bhattacharya, Divine
2023	Rooh Jaga Doon	"Rooh Jaga Doon"	Arijit Singh	Shloke Lal
2024	Chhodunga Na	"Chhodunga Na"	Arijit Singh	Kaushal Kishore
2025	Barkha	"Barkha"	Arijit Singh	Irshad Kamil

== Replaced songs ==
Year	Film	#	Song	Composer(s)	Lyricist(s)	Replaced By	Ref.
2007	The Train	1	"Beete Lamhein"	Mithoon	Sayeed Quadri	KK	
2013	Murder 3	2	"Teri Jhuki Nazar"	Pritam	Sayeed Quadri	Shafqat Amanat Ali Khan	
2014	Kick	3	"Tu Hi Tu"	Himesh Reshammiya	Mayur Puri	Mohammad Irfan	
2016	Sultan	4	"Jag Ghoomeya"	Vishal–Shekhar	Irshad Kamil	Rahat Fateh Ali Khan	
2017	Meri Pyaari Bindu	5	"Maana Ke Hum Yaar Nahin"	Sachin–Jigar	Kausar Munir	Sonu Nigam	
2017	Tubelight	6	"Radio"	Pritam	Amitabh Bhattacharya	Kamaal Khan, Amit Mishra	
2017	Half Girlfriend	7	"Baarish"	Tanishk Bagchi	Arafat Mehmood	Ash King	
