= Madhubanti Bagchi discography =

Discography of the Indian playback singer

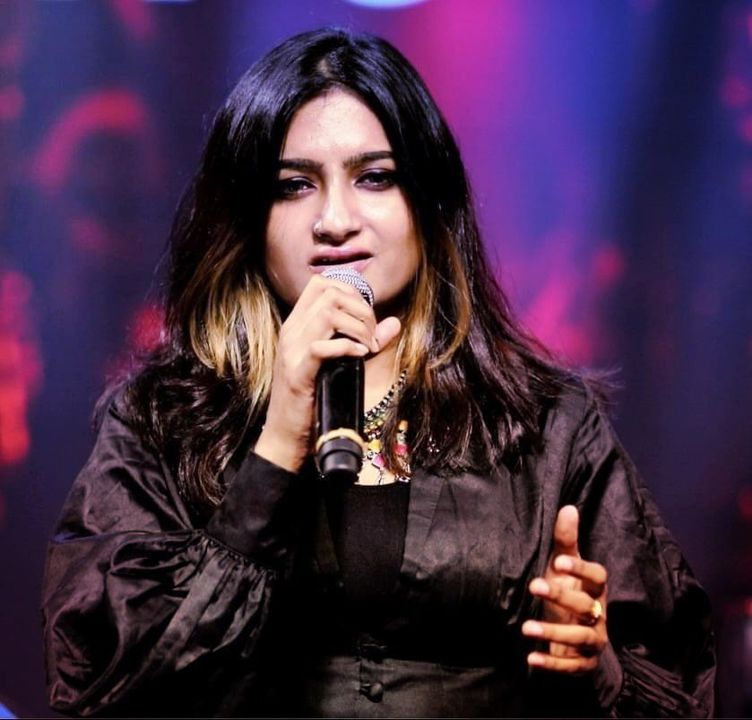
- Madhubanti Bagchi in 2024
- Hindi songs: 51
- Bengali songs: 37
- Other languages: 15
- Total: 103

Madhubanti Bagchi is an Indian playback singer whose discography spans Hindi, Bengali and several other Indian languages. It includes film songs, non-film singles, devotional tracks and various collaborative projects. This page lists her released recordings across different formats and languages.

== Hindi film songs ==
| Year | Song | Film | Lyricist(s) | Composer(s) | Co-singer(s) | Notes | Ref. |
|---|---|---|---|---|---|---|---|
| 2019 | "Tanha Tanha" | Yours Truly | Amitabh Varma | Debojyoti Mishra | | | |
| 2020 | "Shayad (Film Version)" | Love Aaj Kal | Irshad Kamil | Pritam | Arijit Singh | | |
| 2020 | "Burjkhalifa" | Laxmii | Gagan Ahuja | Shashi–DJ Khushi | Shashi–DJ Khushi, Nikhita Gandhi | Disney Plus Hotstar film | |
| 2021 | "Barbaadiyan" | Shiddat | Priya Saraiya | Sachin–Jigar | Sachet Tandon, Nikhita Gandhi | Disney Plus Hotstar film | |
| 2021 | "Bansuri" | Hum Do Hamare Do | Shellee | Sachin–Jigar | Dev Negi, Asees Kaur, IP Singh | Disney Plus Hotstar film | |
| 2022 | "Jhand Ba" | Good Luck Jerry | Raj Shekhar | Parag Chhabra | | Disney Plus Hotstar film | |
| 2022 | "Jhand Ba" (Sad) | Good Luck Jerry | Raj Shekhar | Parag Chhabra | | Disney Plus Hotstar film | |
| 2022 | "Ek Boond" | Doctor G | Puneet Sharma | Amit Trivedi | Abhay Jodhpurkar | | |
| 2022 | "Savera" | Uunchai | Irshad Kamil | Amit Trivedi | Javed Ali, Deepali Sathe | | |
| 2023 | "Ek Taara" | Mast Mein Rehne Ka | Vijay Maurya | Anurag Saikia | Vishal Mishra | Amazon Prime Video film | |
| 2023 | "Ek Taara" (Reprise) | Mast Mein Rehne Ka | Vijay Maurya | Anurag Saikia | Keshav Tyohar | Amazon Prime Video film | |
| 2023 | "Bachpan Ki Galiyan" | Goldfish | Kausar Munir | Tapas Relia | | | |
| 2023 | "Aami Jaani Re" | Mrs. Chatterjee vs Norway | Kausar Munir | Amit Trivedi | | | |
| 2023 | "Zara Hat Ke" | Lost | Swanand Kirkire | Shantanu Moitra | | Zee5 film | |
| 2024 | "Mann Lovely" | Tera Kya Hoga Lovely | Irshad Kamil | Amit Trivedi | Abhay Jodhpurkar | | |
| 2024 | "Mann Lovely" (Version 2) | Tera Kya Hoga Lovely | Irshad Kamil | Amit Trivedi | Raj Barman | | |
| 2024 | "Aaj Ki Raat" | Stree 2 | Amitabh Bhattacharya | Sachin–Jigar | Divya Kumar, Sachin–Jigar | | |
| 2024 | "Geeli Maachis " | Vanvaas | Sayeed Quadri | Mithoon | Shadaab Faridi, Mithoon | | |
| 2024 | "Peelings" | Pushpa 2: The Rule | Raqueeb Alam | Devi Sri Prasad | Javed Ali | Dubbed version | |
| 2025 | "Uyi Amma" | Azaad | Amitabh Bhattacharya | Amit Trivedi | | | |
| 2025 | "Loveyapa Ho Gaya" | Loveyapa | Som | White Noise Collectives | Nakash Aziz | | |
| 2025 | "Galatfehmi" | Nadaaniyan | Amitabh Bhattacharya | Sachin-Jigar | Tushar Joshi | Netflix film | |
| 2025 | "Galatfehmi (Female Version)" | Nadaaniyan | Amitabh Bhattacharya | Sachin-Jigar | | Netflix film | |
| 2025 | "Touch Kiya" | Jaat | Kumaar | Thaman S | Shahid Mallya | | |
| 2025 | "Kiss Kiss Bang Bang" | They Call Him OG - (D) | M. Prasad Babu | Thaman S | Sanjana Kalmanje, Soha | Dubbed version | |
| 2025 | "Ting Ling Sajna" | Bhool Chuk Maaf | Irshad Kamil | Tanishk Bagchi | | | |
| 2025 | "Dil E Nadaan" | Housefull 5 | Kumaar | White Noise Collectives | Sumontho Mukherjee | | |
| 2025 | "Tum Mere Na Huye" | Thamma | Amitabh Bhattacharya | Sachin-Jigar | Rana Mazumder, Sumonto Mukherjee, Divya Kumar | | |
| 2025 | "Filam Dekho" | Nishaanchi | Anurag Saikia | Shashwat Dwivedi | | | |
| 2025 | "Rendezvous Raja" | Nishaanchi 2 | Anurag Saikia | Shashwat Dwivedi | Anurag Saikia | | |
| 2025 | "Shararat" | Dhurandhar | Jasmine Sandlas | Shashwat Sachdev | | | |
| 2025 | "Ramba Ho" | Dhurandhar | Indeevar | Bappi Lahiri, Shashwat Sachdev | | Remake of 1981 song "Rambha Ho Ho Ho" | |
| 2026 | "Tera Aashiq" | Ikkis | Amitabh Bhattacharya | White Noise Collectives | Master Saleem | | |
| 2026 | "Aashiqon Ki Colony" | O'Romeo | Gulzar | Vishal Bhardwaj | Javed Ali | | |
| 2026 | "Jab Talak" | Cocktail 2 | Amitabh Bhattacharya | Pritam | Arijit Singh, Akasa | | |
| 2026 | "Bindaas" | Jailer 2 | Ritesh G. Rao | Anirudh Ravichander | Anirudh Ravichander | Dubbed version | |
| 2026 | ''Tu Mil Jaaye'' | King | Kumaar | Sachin–Jigar | Arijit Singh, Ed Sheeran | | |

== Bengali film songs ==
| Year | Song | Film | Lyricist(s) | Composer(s) | Co-singer(s) | Notes | Ref. |
|---|---|---|---|---|---|---|---|
| 2013 | "Na Na Shey Phirbey Na Aar" | Ami Aar Amar Girlfriends | Anindo Bose | Neel Dutt | Suyasha Sengupta, Reya Kundu | | |
| 2013 | "Mannequin" | Ami Aar Amar Girlfriends | Anindo Bose | Neel Dutt | | | |
| 2015 | "Lilabali" | Cross Connection 2 | Traditional | Neel Dutt | Ujjaini Mukherjee, Arko | | |
| 2015 | "Kanamachhi" | Cross Connection 2 | Souvik Misra | Neel Dutt | Dibbendu | | |
| 2015 | "Egiye De" | Shudhu Tomari Jonyo | Prasen | Arindom Chatterjee | Arijit Singh | | |
| 2016 | "Item Bomb" | Kelor Kirti | Prasen | Indraadip Dasgupta | Rana Mazumder | | |
| 2016 | "Tomake Chai - Reprise" | Gangster | Prasen | Arindom Chatterjee | | | |
| 2016 | "THE CRY...Ami Devi" | Teenanko | Bithin Das | Arko | Arko | | |
| 2016 | "Ki Gabo Ami" | Teenanko | Rabindranath Tagore | Rabindranath Tagore | | | |
| 2018 | "Tor Premer Brishtite" | Chaalbaaz | Anyaman | Savvy Gupta | Armaan Malik | | |
| 2018 | "Aish Kori" | Chaalbaaz | Savvy Gupta | Savvy Gupta | Savvy Gupta | | |
| 2019 | "Kichchu Chaini Ami" | Shah Jahan Regency | Dipangshu Acharya | Prasen | | | |
| 2020 | "Madhu Mashey Phul Photey" | Maayakumari | Subhendu Dasmunshi | Bickram Ghosh | | | |
| 2022 | "Bhul Koreche Bhul" | Kuler Achaar | Prasen | Prasen-Mainak | Mahtim Shakib | | |

== Other-language film songs ==
| Year | Song | Film | Lyricist(s) | Composer(s) | Language |
|---|---|---|---|---|---|
| 2022 | "Vairaagi Re" | Chabutro | Niren Bhatt | Siddharth Amit Bhavsar | Gujarati |
| 2024 | "Jheeli Le" | Vanilla Ice Cream | Niren Bhatt | Siddharth Amit Bhavsar | Gujarati |
| 2024 | "Harakhta Malakta" | Vanilla Ice Cream | Niren Bhatt | Siddharth Amit Bhavsar | Gujarati |
| 2025 | "Kiss Kiss Bang Bang" | They Call Him OG | Sreejo | Thaman S. | Telugu |

== Non-film songs ==
Madhubanti released her debut single "Bhool Ja" in 2020.

In 2022, Madhubanti released her first independent song "Raat Chhuye Jak".

| Year | Song | Singer(s) | Lyricist(s) | Composer(s) | Language | Notes | Ref. |
|---|---|---|---|---|---|---|---|
| 2019 | "Hamari Atariya Pe" | Madhubanti Bagchi | Traditional | Music Produced & Arranged By: Nilanjan Ghosh & Pradyut Chatterjea | Hindi | | |
| 2019 | "Naam Ada Likhna" | Madhubanti Bagchi, Shreyas Puranik | Gulzar | Music Re-created by Shreyas Puranik | Hindi | | |
| 2019 | "Rehne Do Zara" | Madhubanti Bagchi | Kunaal Vermaa | Anurag Saikia | Hindi | | |
| 2020 | "Ab Ke Saawan" | Madhubanti Bagchi | Bhargav Purohit | Sachin-Jigar | Hindi | | |
| 2020 | "Bhool Ja" | Madhubanti Bagchi | Siddharth Amit Bhavsar | Siddharth Amit Bhavsar | Hindi | | |
| 2022 | "Raat Chhuye Jak" | Madhubanti Bagchi | Aviman Paul | Rupak Tiary | Bengali | | |
| 2022 | "Rootha Re" | Madhubanti Bagchi, Vivek Hariharan | Sufi Khan | Romy | Hindi | | |
| 2022 | "Dokhino Hawa" | Madhubanti Bagchi, Tahsan Rahman Khan | Meera Dev Burman | S D Burman, music recreated for Coke Studio Bangla by Shayan Chowdhury Arnob | Bengali | | |
| 2022 | "Siva Tere" | Madhubanti Bagchi | A.M. Turaz | Sanjay Leela Bhansali | Hindi | | |
| 2023 | "Khamakha" | Madhubanti Bagchi | Akshayraje Shinde | Madhubanti Bagchi | Hindi | | |
| 2023 | "Labon Se Baat" | Madhubanti Bagchi | Priya Saraiya | Shekhar Ravjiani | Hindi | | |
| 2025 | "Meetha Khaara" | Aditya Gadhvi, Madhubanti Bagchi, Thanu Khan | Bhargav Purohit | Siddharth Amit Bhavsar | Gujarati | | |

== Television series songs ==
In the year 2021 Madhubanti made her debut on the OTT platforms. She collaborated with National-Award-winning lyricist Swanand Kirkire and Daniel B. George for the OTT web series Grahan. In 2024, she again collaborated with Sanjay Leela Bhansali for his acclaimed web series on Netflix, Heeramandi.

| Year | Song | WebSeries | Singer(s) | Lyricist(s) | Composer(s) | Language |
|---|---|---|---|---|---|---|
| 2021 | "Harjaayi" | "The Bombay Begums" | Madhubanti Bagchi | Ginny Diwan | Anand Bhaskar | Hindi |
| 2021 | "Teri Parchayee" | "Grahan" | Madhubanti Bagchi, Swanand Kirkire | Swanand Kirkire | Daniel B. George | Hindi |
| 2021 | "Zindagi" | "Ajeeb Daastaans" | Madhubanti Bagchi | Tanishk Bagchi | Tanishk Bagchi | Hindi |
| 2022 | "Jogiye" | "Masoom" | Madhubanti Bagchi, Anand Bhaskar | Ginny Diwan | Anand Bhaskar | Hindi |
| 2024 | "Nazariya Ki Maari" | Heeramandi | Madhubanti Bagchi, Anand Bhaskar | Traditional | Sanjay Leela Bhansali | Hindi |

== Accolades ==
| Year | Award | Song | Film | Title | Result | Ref. |
|---|---|---|---|---|---|---|
| 2025 | 69th Filmfare Awards | "Aaj ki Raat" | Stree 2 | Best Female Playback Singer | Won | |
