= Bulbuli Panja =

Indian television actress (born 1978)

Bulbuli Chaubey Panja
- Born: Bulbuli Chaubey; 9 October 1978 (age 47); Bihar, India
- Education: University of Calcutta
- Occupation: Actress
- Years active: 2005–present
- Spouse: Shibaji Panja (m. 2006)
- Children: Shushman Panja (son) (born 2009)
- Relatives: Kalyan Chaubey (brother)

Bulbuli Chaubey Panja is an Indian actress who works in Bengali cinema and television . She was born in Patna, Bihar. She has acted in movies like Bapi Bari Jaa (2012), Cockpit and Bolo Dugga Mai Ki. She has appeared in Star Jalsha and Zee Bangla serials like Andarmahal and Phagun Bou. In 2020, she replaced actress Monalisa Paul to play lead antagonist 'Tandra' in the serial Ke Apon Ke Por.

== Personal life ==
Bulbuli is married to Bengali producer Shibaji Panja since 2006. She has one son named Shushman Panja who was born on 4 March 2009. Footballer Kalyan Chaubey is her older brother.

== Filmography ==
| Year | Film | Director | Character |
|---|---|---|---|
| 2012 | Bapi Bari Jaa | Sudeshna Roy and Abhijit Guha | Biltu's Wife |
| 2017 | Bolo Dugga Mai Ki | Raj Chakraborty | |
| 2017 | Cockpit | Kamaleshwar Mukherjee | Captain Dibakar Rakshit's Wife |
| 2017 | One | Birsa Dasgupta | |

== Television ==
| Year | Serial | Channel | Character |
|---|---|---|---|
| 2005 - 2007 | Ekdin Pratidin | Zee Bangla (later replaced by Monami Ghosh) | Borsha |
| 2015 | Mouchaak | Star Jalsha | Jhimli (lead role) |
| 2014 - 2016 | Dwiragaman | Zee Bangla | Shraboni Sarkar |
| 2013 - 2015 | Chokher Tara Tui | Star Jalsha | Titir |
| 2015 - 2016 | Kojagori | Zee Bangla | Saheb's elder sister |
| 2015 - 2017 | Punyi Pukur | Star Jalsha | Saanji Banerjee |
| 2016 - 2017 | Phoolmoni | Zee Bangla | Feroza Khatun |
| 2017 - 2018 | Andarmahal | Zee Bangla | Sreeradha Basu |
| 2018 - 2019 | Phagun Bou | Star Jalsha | Simontika Dutta |
| 2020 - 2021 | Ke Apon Ke Por | Star Jalsha | Tandra |
| 2020 - 2021 | Pandab Goenda | Zee Bangla | Farzana Begum/Madhumita Paul |
| 2020 - 2022 | Khelaghor | Star Jalsha | Swati Roy |
| 2022 | Godhuli Alap | Star Jalsha | Arindam's ex Girlfriend |
| 2023 | Mukut | Zee Bangla | Bonya Roy Chowdhury |
| 2024 - Present | Akash Kusum | Sun Bangla | Aditi |

== See also ==
- Laboni Sarkar
- Churni Ganguly
