= Yash Dasgupta =

Indian actor (born 1985)

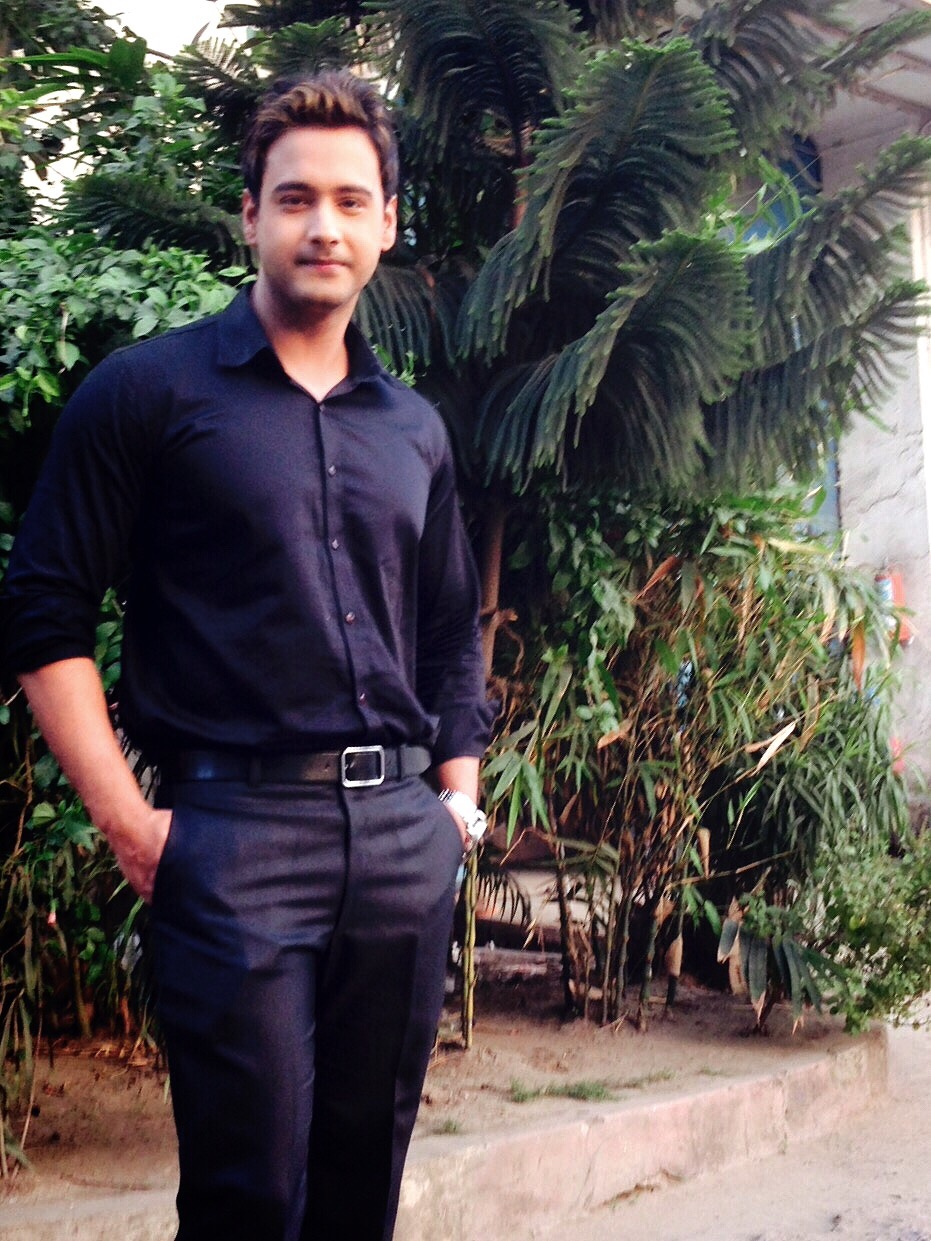
- Yash Dasgupta in 2014
- Born: Debashish Dasgupta; 10 October 1985 (age 41); Calcutta, West Bengal, India
- Occupations: Actor; model; producer
- Years active: 2007–present
- Organization: YD Films
- Known for: See list
- Political party: Bharatiya Janata Party
- Spouse: Shweta Singh Kalhans (m. 2009; div. 2012) Nusrat Jahan (m. 2020)
- Children: 2

Yash Dasgupta (born as Debashish Dasgupta; 10 October 1985) is an Indian actor, producer and TV personality active in Bengali and Hindi entertainment. He began with television dramas and debuted in the Bengali film Gangster (2016). He later debuted in Hindi with Yaariyan 2 (2023). His first appearance in Bengali cinema was in an antagonist role in Pagal Premi (2007) He was listed as the most desirable man in the Calcutta Times list of Most Desirable Men in 2014, 2015 and 2020.

Dasgupta appeared in the TV soap operas Bojhena Se Bojhena and Na Aana Is Des Laado. In 2006, he won the Glam King title in the Unish Kuri Streax Glam Hunt held in Kolkata. Dasgupta is also a politician and belongs to the Bharatiya Janata Party since 17 February 2021.

== Career ==
=== Early career ===
Dasgupta won the Glam King title in the Unish Kuri Streax Glam Hunt held in Kolkata. In 2007, Dasgupta began his acting career as an antagonist in the Bengali film Pagal Premi, alongside Ritwick Chakraborty. This role was not considered his official film debut. Thereafter, he shifted his base to Mumbai to pursue career in acting, joined Roshan Taneja School of Acting, and got his first break as an actor in the television industry. Dasgupta began his acting career in selective roles on national television. He played a fun loving son as Suraj Dharamraj Mahiyavanshi in Bandini, and a character with grey shades as Ketan Sanghvi with Ram Kapoor in Basera He played the role of Karan (Santosh's son, Diya and Jhanvi's cousin brother), in Na Aana Is Des Laado, a story which dealt with the social evil of female infanticide, and concentrates on the problems faced by women in a male-dominated world. Yash did episodic roles as Viraj, a mime artist in Adaalat. He also enacted Demon Kalketu in a mythology called Mahima Shanidev Kii.

In Kolkata Yash had also participated in ETV Bangla celebrity dance reality show Ritur Mela Jhoom Tara Ra Ra which was directed by Shiboprosad Mukherjee

=== 2013–2015 ===
Yash played the popular role of Aranya Singha Roy in Bojhena Se Bojhena, an adaptation in Bengali of the character Arnav Singh Raizada from the Hindi TV series Iss Pyaar Ko Kya Naam Doon? aired from 4 November 2013 to 18 June 2016. Dasgupta entered Times Of India's Most Desirable Men of 2014 and 2015 in the top 10.

=== 2016–2022 ===
Yash was launched in films by Shree Venkatesh Films.

The debut film of Yash Dasgupta was the 2016 romantic thriller Gangster directed by Birsa Dasgupta and parts of it were shot in Istanbul, Turkey. Yash was stranded with the film production unit amid the attempted military coup in Istanbul, Turkey. Later the shooting of the film resumed. In 2020, after SOS Kolkata movie, Dasgupta added two extra 'a' to the spelling of his name, his full name now is Yash Daasguptaa.

=== As producer ===
Dasgupta and Nusrat Jahan opened a production house called YD Films in 2023. It is an Indian film production company based in Kolkata. The company produces films of various genres and also contributes music to a wide range of films.

In 2024, he produced the Bengali action-crime-drama Sentimentaaal, directed by Baba Yadav, released on 19 January 2024. Originally titled Mentaaal, the film’s name was changed due to objections from the censor board. The plot follows Inspector Suryaa, played by Yash Dasgupta, who confronts the illegal activities of local politician Rudrani Chowdhury, portrayed by Sayantani Ghosh. The cast includes Nusrat Jahan as Puja Bose, Sayantani Ghosh as Rudrani Chowdhury, Ravi Shaw as Sandip Sen, Madan Mitra as Commissioner M. Mitra, Vickey Deb as Abhimanyu Bose, Samm Batyacharyya as Ikka, Mainak Banerjea as Kali, and Trina Shaha and Neel Bhattacharya in special appearances.

In 2025, he produced the family drama Aarii, directed by Jiit Chakraborty, set for release on 25 April 2025. Filming began in December 2024 in South Kolkata, with a screenplay by Amitava Bhattacharya, The film explores a mother-son relationship, starring Moushumi Chatterjee as Jaya Sen, Yash Dasgupta, Nusrat Jahan, Partha Bhowmik, Kamaleswar Mukherjee, Unmesh Gunguly, and Srabanti Chatterjee and Somraj Maity in special appearances.The movie was a blockbuster at the box office. His upcoming movie O Mon Bhraman, produced by him, is coming in 2025, starring Swastika Mukherjee, Srabanti Chatterjee, Nusrat Jahan.

=== Political career ===
In March 2021, he had been declared to be the candidate of Bharatiya Janata Party from Chanditala for the 2021 West Bengal Legislative Assembly election to be held from 27 March 2021. He lost the election to Indian Trinamool Congress candidate Swati Khandoker by 41,347 votes.

== Filmography ==
Key
†	Denotes films that have not yet been released

- All films are in Bengali language, unless otherwise noted.

Year	Film	Role	Notes
2007	Pagal Premi	Ajay / Guru	
2016	Gangster	Guru / Kabir	Debut as lead role film
2017	One	Ronojoy Bose	
2018	Total Dadagiri	Joy Das	
2018	Raja Rani Raji	Aditya	Cameo appearance
2018	Fidaa	Ishaan Chatterjee	
2019	Mon Jaane Na	Aamir Nawaz	
2020	SOS Kolkata	Zakir Ahmed	
2022	Cheene Badam	Rishav Sengupta	
2022	Toke Chara Banchbona	Arjun Roy Chowdhury	
2023	Yaariyan 2	Abhay Singh Katyal	Hindi film
2024	Sentimentaaal	OC Surya Roy	Debut as producer
2025	Aarii	Joy Sen	Also producer

=== As producer ===
YD Films is an Indian film production company based in Kolkata. The company was established by Dasgupta and Nusrat Jahan in 2023.

List of film producer credits
Year	Title	Notes
2024	Sentimentaaal	
2025	Aarii	
2026	O Mon Bhromon †	

=== Television ===
Year	Show	Role	Channel	Language	Production
2002	Urmila	Aman	Ultra (TV channel)	Hindi	Ultra (TV channel)
2008	Mahima Shani Dev Kii	Demon Kalketu	Imagine TV	Hindi	
2009	Koi Aane Ko Hai	Debu	Colors TV	Hindi	
2009	Basera	Ketan Sanghvi	NDTV Imagine	Hindi	Sagar Arts
2009	Bandini	Suraj Dharamraj Mahiyavanshi	NDTV Imagine	Hindi	Balaji Telefilms
2010	Na Aana Is Des Laado	Karan Singh	Colors TV	Hindi	Shakuntalam Telefilms
2012	Adaalat	Viraj	Sony	Hindi	Contiloe Entertainment
2013	Bojhena Se Bojhena	Aranya Singha Roy/ ASR/ Radhe/ Chotu	Star Jalsha	Bengali	Shree Venkatesh Films

=== Music videos ===
Year	Video	Director(s)	Singer(s)	Composer(s)	language	Music label
2021	O Mon Re	Baba Yadav	Tanveer Evan	Piran Khan	Bengali	SVF
2022	Hariye Gelam	Adil Shaikh	Luipa and Papon	Taposh	Bengali	TM records

=== Reality shows ===
Year	Title	Role	Language	Ref.
2017	Apur Sangsar	Guest	Bengali	
2018	Dance Bangla Dance Junior	Guest	Bengali	
2022	Dadagiri Unlimited	Participate	Bengali	
2025	Star Jalsha Parivar Awards 2025	Anchor	Bengali	

== Accolades ==
Year	Award	Category	Film/Serial	Result
2006	Unish Kuri Streax Glam Hunt	Glam King		Won
2011	Colors Golden Petal Awards		Na Aana Is Des Laado	Won
2014	Star Jalsha Awards	Agami Diner Sera Award	Bojhena Se Bojhena	Won
2015	Star Jalsha Awards	Best Actor Award	Bojhena Se Bojhena	Won
2015	Star Jalsha Awards	Best Juti	Bojhena Se Bojhena	Won
2015	Star Jalsha Awards	Best Style Icon Male	Bojhena Se Bojhena	Won
2015	Star Jalsha Awards	Priyo Bor	Bojhena Se Bojhena	Won
2015	Star Jalsha Awards	International Jodi of the Year	Bojhena Se Bojhena	Won
2015	Star Jalsha Awards	Best Actor	Bojhena Se Bojhena	Won
2016	Star Jalsa Parivar Award	Best Debutant	Gangster (2016 film)	Won
2017	Filmfare Awards East	Best Debutant Actor (Male)	Gangster (2016 film)	Won
2018	Star Jalsa Parivar Award	Priyo Juti – Movies	One (2017 film)	Won

== Personal life ==
Yash Dasgupta was born to Dipak Dasgupta and Jayati Dasgupta. His real name is Debashish. Yash was previously in a marriage with Shweta Singh Kalhans. They have a son named Rayansh.

Yash began his relationship with actor Nusrat Jahan but their marital status remained unknown as of December 2021. In August 2021, Jahan gave birth to a boy named Yishaan J Dasgupta, at a private hospital in Kolkata. It is reported that the child's birth certificate named Dasgupta as the father. In February 2022, Jahan confirmed their marriage since 2020.
