= Aryann Roy =

Indian actor

Aryann Roy is an Indian actor who has acted in Regional movies, TV Serial and Theatre. His recent work in an independent short film, Butterflies of War, has been widely acknowledged by critics. The short film has also bagged many awards. He has acted in several mainstream Bengali movies like One by Birsa Dasgupta, Zulfiqar with National Award Winning Director Srijit Mukherjee. He has also worked with Arijit Singh in his Directorial Debut movie. Apart from these, he has worked with many renowned Regional Directors like Anik Dutta, Riingo Bannerjee.
