= Gangster (2016 film) =

2016 Indian film by Birsa Dasgupta

- Gangster Movie Poster
- Directed by: Birsa Dasgupta
- Written by: Debalay Bhattacharya; Shweta Bharadwaj; Manish Sharma
- Produced by: Shrikant Mohta; Mahendra Soni
- Starring: Yash Dasgupta; Mimi Chakraborty
- Cinematography: Subhankar Bhar
- Edited by: Ayesha moni
- Music by: Arindom Chatterjee
- Production company: Shree Venkatesh Films
- Distributed by: Shree Venkatesh Films
- Release date: 7 October 2016
- Country: India
- Language: Bengali

Gangster is a 2016 Indian Bengali language action thriller film directed by Birsa Dasgupta under the banner of Shree Venkatesh Films. The film stars debutant Yash Dasgupta with Mimi Chakraborty in leading roles. The film is an action thriller where Yash plays the role of a Gangster. The film has been shot in Istanbul, Turkey. The film was released on 7 October 2016.

== Plot ==
The movie begins in present time, on the anniversary of Kabir and Ruhi. While Kabir shops for his wife and is returning home, he is shot by four masked gangsters. Just before falling out a fifth person shoots him. He is taken to hospital and a shocked Ruhi arrives to see him. The film then takes a flashback to how Kabir became Guru, the gangster.

In a jail years ago, a young Kabir sits terrified as an older prisoner named Jamal tells him to kill his cellmate to prove his worth as a criminal. In return he would be freed. Kabir does so. Jamal tells him to work with him and calls him 'Beta'. Kabir calls him 'Baba'. Jamal tells him that one day he would rule and will be known as Guru. A few years later, Guru is a renowned gangster of Jamal and works exactly what Jamal tells him. He is always accompanied by his closest friend Guti. He is seemingly disturbed and wants to leave his business of being gangster. In an unwanted manner, he goes to kill Vishnu, one of their ex-members of gang. Guru, instead of killing him warns him to run away lest Jamal shall kill him. Later Guru learns Jamal's men have killed Vishnu.

Heartbroken, he next goes to Tommy, a ragtag and persuades him to share 70% of business with Jamal. At a party, to celebrate this, Guru sees a conspiracy being built against him by Chhotu, Tommy, Jameson and few others. Later, Guru and Guti drive at a point where the conspirators trap them into an accident. The car of Guru is hit. Guru comes out of car and fights with the rest as a pretty girl comes amidst. Guru is attracted towards her and falls for her.

Later they meet again at the hospital where Guru pays a hefty amount for expenses of a conspirator whom Ruhi brought to hospital. Over time, Ruhi and Guru get together well. Guru is now least bothered with gang. One day Guru confesses to Ruhi that he is a gangster, but says that he will leave this behind. He proposes to Ruhi and they get married. They then meet Jamal to seek blessings. Jamal asks Guru for a gift. Guru responds by saying he wants live a normal life. Jamal tells him to do so. But all three know that could never happen.

In present day, a shattered Ruhi waits for Kabir to gain consciousness. It is revealed that the fifth person who shot Kabir was Ruhi.

Ruhi tries to kill Kabir again to make sure he is dead. But the police inspector's arrival stops her. Just as Kabir gains consciousness, the duo reconcile and Ruhi pretends to be normal.

Back at home, Kabir calls Jamal to find who shot him. Meanwhile, Guti has find out the shooters were Tommy, Chhotu, Jamal, Jameson. But doesn't know who is the fifth person. Kabir tells Ruhi that he knows who all shot him and this scares her as she feels Kabir knows she shot him. Just as it seems things are about to go worse, Guti enters with his wife and son. Ruhi, Kabir and Guti leave hospital for Kabir's treatment. At the hospital parking lot, Ruhi is attacked by goons. Kabir arrives in time, but it too late to save Kabir and Ruhi's unborn child. Disturbed, Kabir decides to resort to violence as he kills all those who shot him one by one. First, Chhotu then Jameson and Tommy. Meanwhile, trying to save Ruhi, Guti is killed. At last, he goes to kill Jamal, after a few encounters he kills Jamal in the same way he had killed his cellmate. Meanwhile, the police inspector discovers that the fifth person who shot Kabir was Ruhi. He goes to warn Kabir, to arrest him alive.

At Ruhi's mothers shop, Kabir arrives in a tired and hurt condition. Together, they leave for the place where they had first met. Kabir narrates that his changing from Guru the gangster to Kabir was just a small incident but real story began when Ruhi shot him. He wants to know why she did so. But Ruhi demands it's useless to say as Kabir is going to die. Saying this she points her gun towards Kabir. Kabir it was awful, having lost his friend Guti as well as his unborn child and it's better he dies. Ruhi then reveals she was never pregnant, and goons who attacked her was well plotted. Kabir also learns it was she who let the gangsters kill Guti.

Ruhi then reveals her romance with Kabir was a plot to get him killed in a violent way and not as a loving husband. She then says her plot was to revenge the death of her late husband Vishnu, whom Ruhi presumes to be shot by Kabir. Kabir smiles and says he never shot him, it was Chhotu. Hearing this Ruhi is perplexed and realises how Kabir has blindly loved her and she exploited his love. Slowly, a mentally broken Kabir walks into the middle of the road saying he is disturbed to know Ruhi did not love him. Ruhi realises that she in fact loves him, but is ashamed of what she did. A car runs into Kabir and he is dead. Ruhi runs to save him, crying. The film ends with Ruhi crying with Kabir's voice ringing in her head.

== Cast ==
- Yash Dasgupta as Kabir/Guru
- Mimi Chakraborty as Ruhi
- Bratya Basu as Jammwal, Don of Istanbul
- Shantilal Mukherjee as Police officer
- Sourav Das as Gulshan Tariq/Guti
- Soumyajit Majumdar as Chhotu
- Manish Sharma as Tommy
- Ashim Roy Chowdhury
- Satyam Bhattacharya as Young Kabir
- Eyup Cakmak as Jameson
- Anashua Majumdar as Ruhi's mother (guest appearance)
- Biswajit Chakraborty as an Imam (guest appearance)
- Gaurav Chakrabarty as Ajay, Guru's cellmate and his first victim (guest appearance)
- Rajat Ganguly (guest appearance)
- Soham Chakraborty as Vishnu, Ruhi's former lover (special appearance)

== Soundtrack ==
Gangster

Soundtrack album by Arindom Chatterjee
- Released: 2016
- Recorded: 2016
- Genre: Feature film soundtrack
- Length: 19:05
- Language: Bengali
- Label: SVF
- Producer: Shrikant Mohta; Mohendra Soni

Arindom Chatterjee chronology
Shudhu Tomari Jonyo (2015)	Gangster (2016)	One (2017)

Singles from Gangster
- 1. "Tomake Chai" Released: 11 September 2016; 2. "Bolna Re Mon" Released: 18 September 2016; 3. "Chailey" Released: 25 September 2016; 4. "Thik emon evabe" Released: 1 October 2016; 5. "Tomake Chai Reprise" Released: 4 October 2016

All lyrics are written by Prasen (Prasenjit Mukherjee); all music is composed by Arindom Chatterjee.

Track listing
No.	Title	Singer(s)	Length
1.	"Tomake Chai"	Arijit Singh	4:13
2.	"Thik emon evabe"	Arijit Singh	4:23
3.	"Bolna Re Mon"	Arindom Chatterjee	4:37
4.	"Chailey"	Arindom Chatterjee	6:09
5.	"Tomake Chai Reprise"	Madhubanti Bagchi	4:06
Total length:			19:05
