= Godhuli Alap =

2022 Indian television series

- Genre: Drama; Romance; Family
- Written by: Sweta Bhardwaz
- Screenplay by: Sudip Pal; Dialogues; Arpita Pal
- Story by: Sweta Bhardwaz
- Directed by: Raj Chakraborty; Victo; Shyam Aggarwal
- Starring: Koushik Sen; Somu Sarkar; Riju Biswas; Sohag Sen; Diya Chakraborty; Bhaswar Chatterjee
- Opening theme: Godhuli Alap
- Composers: Ritam; Amit
- Country of origin: India
- Original language: Bengali
- No. of seasons: 1
- No. of episodes: 350

Production
- Executive producers: Souvik Bhattacharya; Rahul Dutta; Debashree Dey; Samajita Chatterjee (Star Jalsha); Suptara Dev; Sohini Sinha (Star Jalsha)
- Producer: Raj Chakraborty
- Production location: Kolkata
- Cinematography: Sumit Gupta
- Editors: Abhijit Pradhan; Prasanta Roy
- Camera setup: Multi-camera
- Running time: 22 minutes
- Production company: Raj Chakraborty Productions

Original release
- Network: Star Jalsha
- Release: 21 March 2022 – 4 June 2023

Godhuli Alap was an Indian Bengali romance drama television series produced by Raj Chakraborty under the banner of Raj Chakraborty Productions. It premiered on 21 March 2022 on Bengali General Entertainment Channel Star Jalsha. The show is available on Disney+ Hotstar. The show stars Kaushik Sen, Somu Sarkar and Riju Biswas.

== Synopsis ==
Nolak is presented as a young woman who whose life takes a twist, taking her Kolkata-based advocate Arindam. Arindam spent most of his time fighting a case that had been running for almost 20 years. He had taken an oath that he would not marry until he brings peace to the farmers of Mourigram. But destiny brought these two souls together due to a promise made to Nolak's father.

The story depicts that love cannot be stopped due to age, caste or creed. It shows how love can grow among people from diverse backgrounds even without the support of the society.

== Cast ==
=== Main ===
- Kaushik Sen as Arindam Roy aka AR: Nolok's husband; Anu, and Aditya's brother; Nikhilesh, Illa, and Kasturi's nephew; Agni, Judo, Trisha and Dona's cousin; Arundhati and Akhilesh's son; Mekhla's uncle; A middle-aged advocate.
- Somu Sarkar as Nolok Roy: Haradhan's daughter; Arindam's wife; Mekhla's aunt; A village girl; owner of a Bohurupi group, an advocate.
- Riju Biswas as Aditya "Adi" Roy: Arindam's youngest brother, Rohini's husband.

=== Recurring ===
- Sohag Sen as Arundhati Roy: Arindam, Anu and Aditya's mother and Nolak's mother-in-law; Akhilesh's widow.
- Sumanta Mukherjee as Nikhilesh Roy, Arindam's Uncle, Arundhati's brother-In-Law
- Mou Bhattacharya as Illa Roy; Arindam's Aunt; Late Nikhilesh's wife; Agni and Trisha's mother; Chaiti's mother-in-law
- Bhaswar Chatterjee as Agni Roy: Trisha's elder brother; Arindam, Anu, Adi and Dona's cousin; Nikhilesh's son
- Arpita Mukherjee as Chaiti Roy; Agni's wife; Arindam's sister-in-law.
- Diya Chakraborty as Trisha: Agni's sister; Arindom's cousin.
- Arijita Mukhopadhyay as Buri Pishi
- Suvajit Kar as Jayanta: Buri Pishi's son
- Sahana Sen as Anu: Arindam's sister
- Sincheeta Sanyal as Mekhla: Anu's daughter; Arindam's niece
- Ranjini Chatterjee as Kasturi: Arindam's paternal aunt
- Sristi Pandey as Dona: Kasturi's daughter; Arindam's cousin
- Roshni Bhattacharya as Rohini Roy: Arindam's assistant; Adi's wife
- Shamik Chakrabarty as Judo: Kasturi's youngest son
- Arindya Banerjee as Laalu
- Milan Roychowdhury as Haradhan/Kanai: Nolok's father
- Gautam Mukherjee as Kasturi's husband, Akhilesh & Nikhilesh's Brother-In-Law
- Sayantan Halder as Shantanu Sanyal
- Bulbuli Panja as Arindam's ex girlfriend
- Niladri Lahiri as Santanu's father
