= Bolo Dugga Maiki =

- Theatrical first look
- Directed by: Raj Chakraborty
- Written by: Raj Chakraborty
- Screenplay by: Padmanabha Dasgupta
- Story by: Raj Chakraborty
- Produced by: Shrikant Mohta; Mahendra Soni
- Starring: Ankush Hazra; Nusrat Jahan
- Edited by: Mohammad Kalam
- Music by: Arindam Chatterjee
- Production company: Shree Venkatesh Films
- Distributed by: Shree Venkatesh Films (India); Jaaz Multimedia (Bangladesh)
- Release dates: 22 September 2017 (India); 17 November 2017 (Bangladesh)
- Country: India
- Language: Bengali

Bolo Dugga Maiki is an Indian Bengali language romantic comedy film directed by Raj Chakraborty and produced by Shrikant Mohta and Mahendra Soni under the banner of Shree Venkatesh Films. The film stars Ankush Hazra and Nusrat Jahan in lead roles. The movie is partially based on the 2015 Malayalam movie Oru Vadakkan Selfie.

== Plot ==
Shamyo is a carefree man who lives an extravagant life with his two best friends Bangal and Totlu. Due to his activities, he is disowned by his grandfather and forced to leave his home. The story follows the misadventures of Shamyo after leaving his house. Problems arrived when he took selfies with an unknown girl, Uma, and sent them to his best friends through their WhatsApp group on a train journey. As his best friends posted the selfie on Facebook, Uma's family members misunderstood that Shamyo was the guy with whom Uma eloped. Gobor Pal, Uma's father threatened Shamyo that if he can't return Uma home then he would be killed. After many misadventures, Shamyo and his two friends returned Uma to her home while Shamyo pretending to be "Niloy", the guy with whom Uma had eloped. Gobor's four brothers became angry with Shamyo. But Uma's grandmother accepted Shamyo as her grandson-in-law. Unhappy with her decision, the five brothers planned to take revenge on Shamyo. After winning the 'dhunuchi nach' competition, Uma's family accepted Shamyo and arranged for their wedding. But Shamyo complicated the situation by returning to his grandfather without telling anyone of Uma's family. On the other hand, Uma learned that she was adopted by her family and so left the house. But Shamyo returned her to her family. Shamyo's grandfather saw the change in his grandson and accepted the wedding of Shamyo and Uma.

== Cast ==
- Ankush Hazra as Shamyo
- Nusrat Jahan as Uma
- Rajatava Dutta as Gobor, Uma's father
- Sudip Mukherjee as Uma's uncle
- Sourav Das as Bangal, Shamyo's friend
- Rajdeep Ghosh as Totlu, Shamyo's friend
- Paran Bandopadhyay as Shamyo's grandfather
- Kaushik Banerjee as Shamyo's uncle
- Debika Mitra
- Rupsa Dasgupta
- Parthasarathi Chakraborty
- Sugato Roy
- Proshor Biswas
- Soumen Bhattacharya
- Bulbuli Pandja
- Puspita Mukherjee
- Ishita Chatterjee
- Horidas Chatterjee as Jhinge
- Arun Kumar Guha Thakurata
- Supriyo Dutta as bar owner (cameo appearance)
- Moyna Mukherjee as Pia, Uma's sister-in-law

== Soundtrack ==
Bolo Dugga Maiki

Soundtrack album by Arindam Chatterjee
- Released: 25 September 2017
- Studio: AMV Studios
- Genre: Soundtrack
- Language: Bengali
- Label: SVF
- Producer: Arindom

Arindam Chatterjee chronology
One (2017)	Bolo Dugga Maiki (2017)	Cockpit (2017)

Singles from Bolo Dugga Maiki
- 1. "Hote Paare Na" Released: 16 August 2017; 2. "Dugga Ma" Released: 27 August 2017; 3. "Tomar Dyakha Naai" Released: 3 September 2017; 4. "Lukochuri" Released: 17 September 2017

All lyrics are written by Priyo Chattopadhyay, Raja Chanda, Prasen (Prasenjit Mukherjee), Dipangshu Acharya; all music is composed by Arindam Chatterjee.

No.	Title	Lyrics	Singer(s)	Length
1.	"Hote Paare Na"	Prasen (Prasenjit Mukherjee)	Arindam Chatterjee and Prashmita Paul	05:13
2.	"Dugga Ma"	Priyo Chattopadhyay, Raja Chanda and Prasen (Prasenjit Mukherjee)	Arijit Singh	04:30
3.	"Tomar Dyakha Naai"	Prasen (Prasenjit Mukherjee)	Arijit Singh	03:35
4.	"Lukochuri"	Dipangshu Acharya	Nakash Aziz	03:46

Notes

- "Hote Paare Na" was programmed by Prasad Shashte and Suvam Moitra; guitar performed by Ankur Mukherjee and Suvam Moitra; pre-mixed by Suvam Moitra; mix and master by Eric Pillai
- "Dugga Ma" was mixed and mastered by Eric Pillai
- "Tomar Dyakha Naai" was programmed by Hyacinth D'souza and Soumo - Subho; mixed and mastered by Shadab Rayeen
- "Lukochuri" was programmed by Sourav Roy, mixed and mastered by Suvam Moitra, with an African chorus by Mustapha Mensa, guitar by Banjo Dotara, ukulele by Ankur Mukherjee and cajon by Deepesh and Onkar

== Production ==
Bolo Dugga Maiki was produced by SVF Entertainment. Some parts of the film were filmed in Murshidabad, Nashipur, Bangkok.

== Release ==
Bolo Dugga Maiki was released by SVF Entertainment in India alongside the holiday of Puja. The film was released alongside other high-profile films releasing for the Puja holiday, such as Yeti Obhijaan and Cockpit. In response to this, actor Ankush Hazra said "So many films with good content are being released this Puja. I think people will find it the perfect time to watch Bengali movies as this is the time to go back to their roots and be proud of 'Bangaliana' (Bengaliness)."

It was announced in November that Bangladeshi film company Jaaz Multimedia would release the film in Bangladesh on 17 November 2017, after a deal was made with SVF Entertainment. The deal made between Jaaz Multimedia and SVF Entertainment was made under the South Asia Free Trade Area agreement (SAFTA).

=== Critical reception ===
Srijoy Mukherjee of The Times of India wrote in his review that the film had a promising start, but eventually becomes just a generic comedy. Noting the film's direction, vision, usage of product placements and lack of usage of the Puja theme and Nusrat Jahan's character, the film was let down by an average script. However, the review the performances of the two lead actors, especially Ankush Hazra, noting his expressions, comic timing and body language and lauding his ability as a comic actor.
