= Fidaa (2018 film) =

- Fidaa Movie Poster
- Directed by: Pathikrit Basu
- Produced by: Shrikant Mohta
- Starring: Yash Dasgupta
- Cinematography: Souvik Basu
- Edited by: Subha Pramanik
- Music by: Arindam Chatterjee
- Production company: Shree Venkatesh Films
- Distributed by: Shree Venkatesh Films
- Release date: 13 July 2018
- Country: India
- Language: Bengali

Fidaa (transl. In love / Spellbound) is an Indian Bengali romantic drama film, which was scheduled to be released on 13 July 2018, under the banner of Shree Venkatesh Films. The film is produced by Shrikant Mohta and directed by Pathikrit Basu. It is the debut film of Sanjana Banerjee along with Yash Dasgupta in lead roles. The movie is a remake of 2018 Telugu movie Tholi Prema.

== Plot ==
The film starts with Ishaan (Yash Dasgupta) searching frantically for his love in London, where she has gone missing. The film cuts to a flashback and Ishaan starts talking about how he is successful at work but his love life is a failure. The flashback starts with Ishaan beating up a fellow student during a football match. After this he runs away with his friends and decides to leave the place. He is on the train and that's where he meets Khushi (Sanjana Banerjee) who saves him from meeting with a deadly accident. He instantly falls in love with her and does many tactics to win her heart. Khushi is a very reserved girl while Ishaan is outgoing. Ishaan proposes to Khushi and he expected an answer by the morning where the journey ends, but to his surprise when he woke up, Khushi was nowhere to be found.

Ishaan joins college and about three months have passed and he has no idea where Khushi is. To his surprise, he finds Khushi and she tells him that she enrolled in his college just for him by paying a lot of money. Khushi gives a lot of signs that she is in love with him but she doesn't say those 3 words to Ishaan which he tries extremely hard for.

Their love blossoms and eventually they break up because of Ishaan's impulsive nature. Six years have passed and Ishaan is a successful student, topping his college, but is unable to forget Khushi. Khushi and Ishaan both meet up in his workplace and at first, Ishaan hates her while Khushi yearns for his attention. Slowly, they both become friends and yet Ishaan does not admit that he is still in love with her and hurts Khushi.

Ishaan and Khushi get into a fight, and Khushi gives him back the things Ishaan gave her six years ago when they were in a relationship. He opens the box and finds out that she kept the love he gave her and the hate he gave her and realizes that she only decided to come back Ishaan's life after six years because she still loves him. He realizes that he still loves her and runs back to find her only to realize that Khushi is gone. He runs and he finally finds her in a train station and he proposes to her. The story ends with both embracing with a kiss.

== Cast ==
- Yash Dasgupta as Ishaan Chatterjee
- Sanjana Banerjee as Khushi Mukherjee
- Anindya Chatterjee as Rahul Singha Roy - Ishaan's Friend
- Ashish Vidyarthi as Pad Gopal
- Matt Townsend as Police Officer
- Joey Debroy as Suresh
- Sanghasri Sinha Mitra

== Soundtrack ==
Fidaa

Soundtrack album by Arindam Chatterjee
- Studio: Shree Venkatesh Films
- Genre: Feature film soundtrack
- Length: 17:36
- Label: SVF
- Producer: Shrikant Mohta

Singles from Fidaa
- 1. "Tomake" Released: 26 May 2018; 2. "Hoye Jete Pari" Released: 31 May 2018; 3. "Eka Din" Released: 14 June 2018; 4. "Thiki Thiki" Released: 12 July 2018

All lyrics are written by Prasen (Prasenjit Mukherjee); all music is composed by Arindam Chatterjee.

| No. | Title | Singer | Length |
|---|---|---|---|
| 1. | "Tomake" | Arindam Chatterjee and Nikhita Gandhi | 05:03 |
| 2. | "Hoye Jete Pari" | Arijit Singh | 05:12 |
| 3. | "Eka Din" | Minar Rahman | 03:47 |
| 4. | "Hoye Jetey Paari (Revisited)" | Arijit Singh | 04:47 |
| 5. | "Thiki Thiki" | Amit Mishra | 03:20 |
| 6. | "Tomake Reprise Version" | Arindam Chatterjee | 05:08 |
| Total length: | | | 17:36 |

== Release ==
The official poster of the film was released on 26 March 2018. In this first look poster of the film Sanjana Banerjee's face was not shown properly. So critics and audiences were having queries about the female character, that has a role of gaining Fidaa's popularity. After launching the trailer of this film on 7 June 2018, it was confirmed that the lead actress is debutant Sanjana Banerjee here. The movie was originally slated for an Eid release on June 15, but the makers have postponed the release date to July 13.
