= Nikhita Gandhi =

Indian playback singer

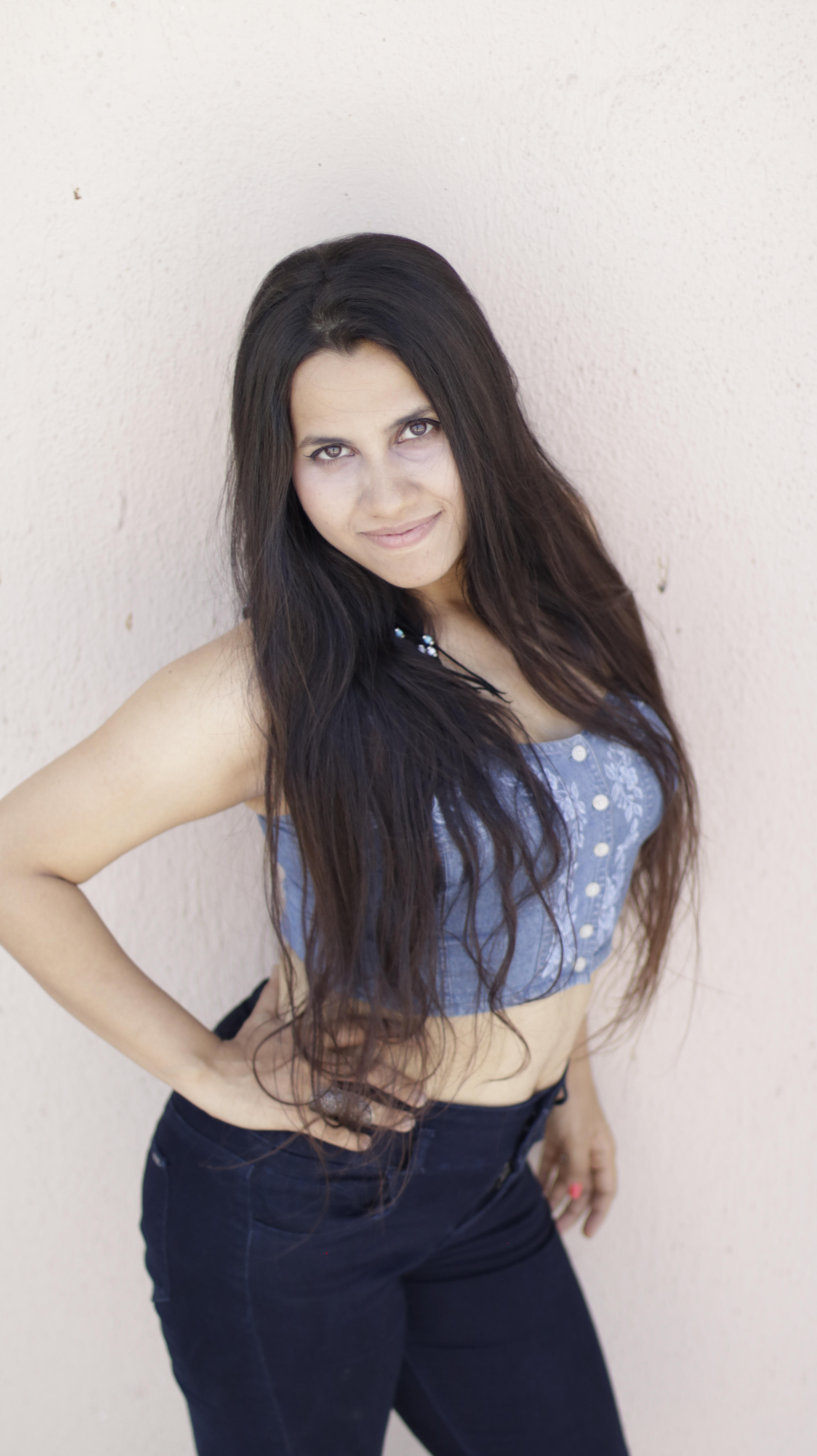
- Gandhi in 2017

Background information
- Born: 1 October 1991 (age 35); Kolkata, West Bengal, India
- Genre: Playback singing
- Occupation: Singer
- Years active: 2013–present

Nikhita Gandhi (born 1 October 1991) is an Indian playback singer who has worked in Indian films in five different languages. She has worked in Tamil, Hindi, Telugu, Bengali, and Kannada film projects.

She playback sung for Deepika Padukone in Raabta for the title track "Raabta". Her duet song " Ullu Ka Pattha" with Arijit Singh from the film Jagga Jasoos is a hit. She has sung for many Hindi films including Sachin: A Billion Dreams, Jab Harry Met Sejal, Kedarnath, Luka Chuppi, Sooryavanshi and Tiger 3. She has also sang Bengali and Tamil songs from movies like Leo, Varisu, Cockpit and Kishmish. Her songs "Aao Kabhi Haveli Pe" and "Poster Lagwa Do" also became popular. The song "Jugnu" with Badshah turned out a viral hit.

== Personal life ==
Gandhi was born in Kolkata and lived in Chennai while doing her graduation. Growing up she learnt Odissi dance and Hindustani music for almost 12 years.

== Career ==
Born into a mixed Bengali and Punjabi family in Kolkata. Gandhi did her schooling at La Martiniere for Girls, Kolkata. She relocated to Chennai in 2010 to pursue a degree in dentistry. A former student of A. R. Rahman's K. M. College of Music and Technology, Nikhita's first association with Rahman was during an Indo-German exchange, where she was a part of a choir which performed with the German orchestra. Rahman then individually auditioned her for a commercial project titled 'Qyuki' with Shekhar Kapur, the duo were working on. In 2012, she cut a Bengali album titled Kotha, a re-arrangement of Nazrul Geeti, songs written by renowned poet Kazi Nazrul Islam.

After having worked on her personal studio album and sung as a part of songs in regional films, Gandhi got a breakthrough by performing the song "Ladio" from Shankar's film, I (2015). Composed by A. R. Rahman, she managed to record the song within four hours after translating it into Hindi. She then also subsequently recorded the Telugu and Hindi versions of the song, earning critical acclaim for her work. Other projects she worked for in 2015 include Rahman's O Kadhal Kanmani and Anirudh's Thanga Magan.

Apart from singing in the movies, she has put together a band and has also performed at Kerala and Kolkata. Gandhi's five-member band includes Sajith Sathya, Jerard Felix, Godfrey Immanuel and Joshua Gopal.

She has been adjudged as the best female playback singer of the year by Zee Cine Awards 2018 for the title track of Raabta.

She was nominated for best playback singer (female) category in the 63rd Filmfare Awards for her song "Ghar" from Jab Harry Met Sejal.

She was also nominated for best playback singer (female) in the 3rd Filmfare Awards East for her Bengali song "Tomra Ekhono Ki" from Meghnad Badh Rahasya.

In November 2018 she did playback for the song "Qaafirana" from the film Kedarnath and became a hit. In April 2019, she won the Nestle Kitkat Sony Mix Audience Music Award for the best duet for Qaafirana from Kedarnath along with Arijit Singh.

In April 2019, she released her single Ek Do Teen on Zee Music Company that has been composed by Raees & Zain - Sam, she later followed it up with Madari from the film The Extraordinary Journey of The Fakir along with Vishal Dadlani in June 2019 and followed it up with Main Deewana Tera from Arjun Patiala

In 2024, Gandhi participated in Jhalak Dikhhla Jaa as a wild card entrant but did not get selected.

In August 2025, Gandhi signed a worldwide management and bookings agreement with The Hello Group India, a joint-venture between The Hello Group and Sony Music Entertainment India.

== Discography ==
Denotes films that have not yet been released

Year	Film	Song title	Co-singer	Music director	Language
2013	Kalyana Samayal Saadham	"Modern Kalyanam"	Megha	Navin	Tamil
2015	I	"Ladio"	Solo	A. R. Rahman	Tamil
2015	I	"Lady O" (Dubbed version)	Solo	A. R. Rahman	Hindi
2015	I	"Ladiyo" (Dubbed version)	Solo	A. R. Rahman	Telugu
2015	Yevade Subramanyam	"Beautiful Zindagi"	Solo	Radhan	Telugu
2015	O Kadhal Kanmani	"Theera Ulaa"	A. R. Rahman, Darshana	A. R. Rahman	Tamil
2015	Ouija	"Nam Sexy Looksu"	Solo	Hari Nikesh	Kannada
2015	Aata	"Ma sexy lookse"	Solo	Hari Nikesh	Telugu
2015	Thanga Magan	"Oh Oh"	Dhanush	Anirudh Ravichander	Tamil
2015	Muhammad: The Messenger of God	"Prologue —The Infinite Light"	Faarooqi Parissa	A. R. Rahman	Arabic
2015	Muhammad: The Messenger of God	"Signs of the Last Prophet"	Solo	A. R. Rahman	Arabic
2015	Muhammad: The Messenger of God	"And He was Named Muhammad (SAL)"	Solo	A. R. Rahman	Arabic
2016	Dhruva	Neethone Dance Tonight	Hiphop Tamizha	Hiphop Tamizha	Telugu
2016	Singam 3 (Dubbed version)	Wi Wi Wi Wifi	Karthik, Christopher Stanley	Harris Jayaraj	Tamil
2017	Dhayam	"Nee Yaaro"	Solo	Sathish Selvam	Tamil
2017	Kaatru Veliyidai	"Saarattu Vandiyila"	A. R. Reihana, Tippu	A. R. Rahman	Tamil
2017	Cheliyaa (Dubbed version)	"Morethukuchindi"	A. R. Reihana, Tippu	A. R. Rahman	Telugu
2017	Kavan	"Boomerang"	Hiphop Tamizha, Velmurugan	Hiphop Tamizha	Tamil
2017	Raabta	"Raabta Title Song"	Arijit Singh	Pritam	Hindi
2017	Jagga Jasoos	"Ullu ka Pattha"	Arijit Singh	Pritam	Hindi
2017	Maacher Jhol	"Bangali Maacher Jhol"	Anupam Roy		Bengali
2017	Sachin: A Billion Dreams (Dubbed version)	"Sachin Sachin"	Sid Sriram, Poorvi Koutish	A. R. Rahman	Tamil
2017	Sachin: A Billion Dreams (Dubbed version)	"Sachin Sachin"	Parag Chhabra, Poorvi Koutish	A. R. Rahman	Telugu
2017	Sachin: A Billion Dreams (Dubbed version)	"Sachin Sachin"	Nakash Aziz, Poorvi Koutish	A. R. Rahman	Marathi
2017	Jab Harry Met Sejal	"Ghar"	Mohit Chauhan	Pritam	Hindi
2017	Arjun Reddy	"Dhooram"	Solo	Radhan	Telugu
2017	Spyder	"Boom Boom"	Solo	Harris Jayaraj	Telugu; Tamil
2017	Cockpit	"Mithe Alo"	Atif Aslam	Arindom Chatterjee	Bengali
2017	Mental Madhilo	"Malik Tere"	Solo	Prashanth R Vihari	Telugu
2017	Yuddham Sharanam	"Padmavyuham"	Pranav Chaganty	Vivek Sagar	Telugu
2017	Chef	"Tan Tan"	Solo	Raghu Dixit	Hindi
2017	Ittefaq	"Ittefaq Se (Raat Baaki)"	Jubin Nautiyal	Tanishk Bagchi	Hindi
2018	Beyond the Clouds	"Beyond The Clouds"	Solo	A. R. Rahman	Hindi, Tamil, English
2018	Beyond the Clouds	"Ala Re Ala"	Dilshaad Shabbir Shaikh, Srinivas Raghunathan, MC Heam	A. R. Rahman	Hindi, Tamil, English
2018	Beyond the Clouds	"Ey Chhote Motor Chala"	MC Heam, Arjun Chandy, Sid Sriram	A. R. Rahman	Hindi, Tamil, English
2018	Oru Nalla Naal Paathu Solren	"Hey Reengara"	Saisharan, Mark Thomas	Justin Prabhakaran	Tamil
2018	Sanju	"Mujhe Chand Pe Le Chalo"	Solo	A. R. Rahman	Hindi
2018	Fidaa	"Tomake"	Arindom Chatterjee		Bengali
2018	Crisscross	"Duniya"	Solo	JAM8	Bengali
2018	Crisscross	"Bari Phire Aye"	Solo	JAM8	Bengali
2018	Villain	"Bhole Baba"	Badshah	JAM8	Bengali
2018	Hoichoi Unlimited	"Oh Baby"	Armaan Malik	Savvy	Bengali
2018	Kabir	"Kabir (Title Track)"	Ishaan Mitra, Arijit Dev	Indraadip Dasgupta	Bengali
2018	Mitron	"Sawarne Laage" (Female Version)	Solo	Tanishk Bagchi	Hindi
2018	Stree	"Aao Kabhi Haveli Pe"	Badshah, Sachin–Jigar	Sachin–Jigar	Hindi
2018	Manmarziyaan	"Dhyaanchand"	Vijay Yamla, Amit Trivedi, Suhas Sawant	Amit Trivedi	Hindi
2018	Kedarnath	"Qaafirana"	Arijit Singh	Amit Trivedi	Hindi
2019	Bhobishyoter Bhoot	Bhobishyoter Bhoot Title Song	Solo	Debojyoti Mishra	Bengali
2019	Luka Chuppi	"Poster Lagwa Do"	Mika Singh, Sunanda Sharma	White Noise	Hindi
2019	Ek Do Teen (Music Video)	"Ek Do Teen"	Solo	Raees-Zain-Sam	Hindi, Punjabi
2019	Mukherjee Dar Bou	Khachar Pakhi	Solo	Rabindranath Tagore, Indraadip Dasgupta	Bengali
2019	Chikati Gadilo Chithakotudu	"Nuvvele Nuvve"	Sanjith Hegde	Balamurali Balu	Telugu
2019	Majili	"Naa Gundello"	Yazin Nizar	Gopi Sundar	Telugu
2019	Majili	"Yedetthu Mallele"	Kaala Bhairava	Gopi Sundar	Telugu
2019	The Extraordinary Journey Of The Fakir	"Madari"	Vishal Dadlani	Amit Trivedi	Hindi
2019	Meghnadbodh Rohoshyo	"End Song"	Solo	Debojyoti Mishra	Bengali
2019	Uronchondi	"Saiyo Re"	Solo	Debojyoti Mishra	Bengali
2019	Arjun Patiala	"Main Deewana Tera"	Guru Randhawa	Sachin Jigar, Guru Randhawa	Hindi
2019	Ranarangam	:Pilla Picture Perfect"	Solo	Sunny MR	Telugu
2019	Panther: Hindustan Meri Jaan	"Marhaba"	Abhay Jodhpurkar, Shovon Ganguly	Amit-Ishan	Bengali
2019	Oriplast Originals	"Eh Shomoy"	Javed Ali	Subhadeep Mitra	Bengali
2019	Action	"Maula Maula"	Kutle Khan, Bamba Bakya	Hiphop Tamizha	Tamil
2019	Ghost	"Dil Maang Raha Hai" (Female Version)	Yasser Desai	Sanjeev–Darshan	Hindi
2019	Paap	"Paap Ki Parchayi"	Solo	Subho Pramanik	Bengali
2020	Love Aaj Kal Porshu	"Shune ne"	Dev Arijit	Arindom Chatterjee	Bengali
2020	Love Aaj Kal Porshu	"Shune Ne" (Reprise Version)	Ash King	Arindom Chatterjee	Bengali
2020	Baaghi 3	"Do You Love Me"	Solo	Tanishk Bagchi	Hindi
2020	V	"Ranga Rangeli"	Yazin Nizar	Amit Trivedi	Telugu
2020	Jai Mummy Di	"Jai Mummy Di – Title Track"	Parag Chhabra, Vivek Hariharan, Devender Pal Singh	Parag Chhabra	Hindi
2020	Titli	"Serial song"	Solo	Arindom Chatterjee, Suvam Moitra	Bengali
2020	SOS Kolkata	"Raagi Raja"	Oindrila Sanyal, Dev Arijit	Savvy Gupta	Bengali
2020	Durga Puja Special Song	"Bolo Dugga Maiki"	Nakash Aziz	Jeet Gannguli	Bengali
2020	Laxmii	"Burjkhalifaa"	Shashi-DJ Khushi		Hindi
2020	Angrezi Medium	"Nachan Nu Jee Karda"	Romy	Tanishk Bagchi	Hindi
2020	Naach Meri Rani (Music Video)	"Naach Meri Rani"	Guru Randhawa	Tanishk Bagchi	Hindi
2020	Unarvugal Thodarkadhai	"Alaya"	Hari Dafusia		Tamil
2021	Bad Boy x Bad Girl (Music Video)	"Bad Boy x Bad Girl"	Badshah		Hindi
2021	Baazi	"Baare Baare"	Dev Negi	Jeet Gannguli	Bengali
2021	Ranjha Tere Naal (Music Video)	"Ranjha Tere Naal"	Solo	Haroon Gavin	Hindi
2021	Jugnu (Music Video)	"Jugnu"	Badshah	Badshah, Hiten	Hindi
2021	Sardar Ka Grandson	"Jee Ni Karda"	Jass Manak	Tanishk Bagchi	Hindi
2021	Shiddat	"Barbaadiyan"	Sachet Tandon, Madhubanti Bagchi, Sachin–Jigar	Sachin–Jigar	Hindi
2021	Sooryavanshi	"Najaa"	Pav Dharia	Tanishk Bagchi	Hindi
2021	Jhoota Lagda(Music Video)	"Jhoota Lagda"	Solo	Nitesh T	Hindi
2021	99 Songs	"Poyisonna Posikiduven"	Shashaa Tirupati	A. R. Rahman	Tamil
2021	99 Songs	"Jola Jola"	Shashaa Tirupati	A. R. Rahman	Telugu
2022	Badhaai Do	"Bandi Tot"	Ankit Tiwari		Hindi
2022	Freddy	"Kala Jaadu"	Arijit Singh	Pritam	Hindi
2022	Govinda Naam Mera	"Kya Baat Ay 2.0"	Hardy Sandhu	Tanishk Bagchi, B Praak	Hindi
2022	Etharkkum Thunindhavan	"Summa Surrunu"	Armaan Malik	D. Imman	Tamil
2022	Kishmish	"Tui Bolbo Na Tumi"	Subhadeep Pan	Nilayan Chatterjee	Bengali
2022	Kishmish	"Janina Bhalolaga"	Shaswat Singh	Nilayan Chatterjee	Bengali
2022	Kolkatar Harry	"Tara Khosa Raat"	Solo	Jeet Ganguli	Bengali
2022	Dhaakad	"She's On Fire"	Badshah	Shankar–Ehsaan–Loy	Hindi
2022	Dhaakad	"Namonishan"	Shankar Mahadevan	Shankar–Ehsaan–Loy	Hindi
2022	O Kala	"Selayeti"	Abhay Jodhpurkar, Arun Kaundinya	Neelesh Mandalapu	Telugu
2022	Naughty Balam (Music Video)	Naughty Balam	Rahul Vaidya and Mellow D	Rahul Vaidya	Hindi
2023	Shehzada	"Munda Sona Hoon Main"	Diljit Dosanjh	Pritam	Hindi
2023	Shehzada	"Chedkhaniyan"	Arijit Singh	Pritam	Hindi
2023	Tu Jhoothi Main Makkaar	"Tere Pyaar Mein"	Arijit Singh	Pritam	Hindi
2023	Selfiee	"Selfiee Title Song"	Nakash Aziz, Akasa Singh	Lijo George-DJ Chetas	Hindi
2023	Jogira Sara Ra Ra	"Cocktail"	Nakash Aziz	Tanishk Bagchi	Hindi
2023	Varisu (D)	"Jimki Song"	Harshvardhan Wavre	Thaman S	Hindi
2023	Thank You for Coming	"Desi Wine"	Qaran, The Rish, Arjun	Qaran	Hindi
2023	Thank You for Coming	"Duniya Farzi"	Vishal Mishra, Hansika Pareek	Vishal Mishra	Hindi
2023	Ganapath	"Lafda Kar Le"	Amit Trivedi	Amit Trivedi	Hindi
2023	Leo	"Ordinary Person"	Solo	Anirudh Ravichander	Tamil
2023	Aankh Micholi	"Shaadi Dope Hai"	Dev Negi, Rakesh Maini	Sachin-Jigar	Hindi
2023	Tiger 3	"Leke Prabhu Ka Naam"	Arijit Singh	Pritam	Hindi
2024	Bade Miyan Chote Miyan	"Mast Malang Jhoom"	Arijit Singh, Vishal Mishra	Vishal Mishra	Hindi
2024	Madgaon Express	"Baby Bring It On"	Ajay Gogavale	Ajay-Atul	Hindi
2024	Ishq Vishk Rebound	"Ishq Vishk Pyaar Vyaar"	Sonu Nigam, MellowD	Rochak Kohli	Hindi
2024	Ishq Vishk Rebound	"Gore Gore Mukhde Pe"	Udit Narayan, Badshah	Badshah, Hiten	Hindi
2024	Vedaa	"Holiyaan"	Asha Sapera, MC Square	Yuva	Hindi
2025	War 2	"Aavan Jaavan"	Arijit Singh	Pritam	Hindi
2025	War 2	Ulagena Uruveduthaay (Dubbed version)	Shashwat Singh	Pritam	Tamil
2025	War 2	Oopiri Ooyalaga (Dubbed version)	Shashwat Singh	Pritam	Telugu
2025	Thug Life	"Sugar Baby" (Dubbed version)	Shuba, Shashwat Singh	A. R. Rahman	Hindi
2025	Thug Life	"Veer E Kainaat" (Dubbed version)	A. R. Ameen, Prashanth Venkat	A. R. Rahman	Hindi
2025	Metro... In Dino	"Das Haasil Sau Baaki" (Acapella)	Papon, Shashwat Singh	Pritam	Hindi
2025	Metro... In Dino	"Ishq Ya Tharak"	Aditya Roy Kapur, Antara Mitra, Shashwat Singh	Pritam	Hindi
2025	Blackmail	"Othukkiriya"		D. Imman	Tamil
2025	Baaghi 4	"Bahli Sohni"	Mani Moudgill, Badshah		Hindi
2025	Heer Express	"I Love My India"	Javed Ali	Tanishk Bagchi	Hindi
2025	Sunny Sanskari Ki Tulsi Kumari	"Panwadi"	Khesari Lal Yadav, Masoom Sharma, Dev Negi, Pritam, Akasa Singh, Siva G	A.P.S	Hindi
2026	Mon Maaney Na	"Ke Tumi Nandini 2.0"	Subhadeep Pan, Doctor Q, Manna Dey	Nilayan Chatterjee	Bengali
2026	Kadhal Reset Repeat	"Halo Halo"	Deepthi Suresh	Harris Jayaraj	Tamil
2026	Bhooth Bangla	"Tu Hi Disda"	Arijit Singh	Pritam	Hindi

== Accolades ==
Award Ceremony	Category	Nominated work	Result	Ref.(s)
10th Mirchi Music Awards	Female Vocalist of The Year	"Ghar" from Jab Harry Met Sejal	Nominated	
Filmfare Awards	Best Playback Singer (Female)	"Ghar" from Jab Harry Met Sejal	Nominated	
Sony MIX Audience Music Awards	Best Duet	Qaafirana from Kedarnath	Won	
