= Cockpit (2017 film) =

2017 film by Kamaleshwar Mukherjee

- Movie poster
- Directed by: Kamaleshwar Mukherjee
- Written by: Kamaleshwar Mukherjee
- Screenplay by: Kamaleshwar Mukherjee
- Based on: Life of Dibyendu Rakshit
- Produced by: Gurupada Adhikari & Dev
- Starring: Dev; Koel; Rukmini; Ziaul Roshan
- Cinematography: Subhankar Bhar
- Edited by: Rabiranjan Maitra
- Music by: Arindom Chatterjee
- Production company: Dev Entertainment Ventures
- Distributed by: Piyali Films (India); Jaaz Multimedia (Bangladesh)
- Release dates: 22 September 2017 (India); 8 December 2017 (Bangladesh)
- Running time: 141:15 minutes
- Country: India
- Language: Bengali

Cockpit is an Indian Bengali language disaster romantic thriller film written and directed by Kamaleshwar Mukherjee and produced by Dev under the banner of Dev Entertainment Ventures. The film features Dev, Koel and Rukmini in the lead roles. This is the second time Kamaleshwar Mukherjee and Dev are working as a director-actor duo, after the 2013 film Chander Pahar. The film got positive response from critics and audience and was a box office 'hit'.

== Plot ==
Cockpit is a story inspired by true incidents. The story follows a flight that is going from Mumbai to Kolkata and gets hit from bad turbulent weather. The film will follow as the pilot attempts to land the plane, even with damaged engines.

=== 1996 ===
The film opens with date 12 November 1996. Capt. Divakar Rakshit (Prosenjit Chaterjee) is commanding a flight from London to Delhi. Divakar interacts with his Co-Pilot about his further plans after reaching Delhi. He says that he will then fly back to Kolkata to celebrate his son's birthday, after much conversation the crew finally starts it descend to Delhi. Meanwhile, Another aircraft has taken off from Delhi, the ATC orders the flight to ascend but the captain didn't hear it properly. And suddenly both the aircraft come face to face. Both the pilots try their best to evade but it's too late resulting in a deadly crash, killing passengers and crew of both the aircraft.

=== Present Day ===
Capt. Dibyendu Rakshit (Dev) son of late Capt. Divakar Rakshit, is now serving as a Captain of Boeing 737 in Oriental Airlines. Dibyendu is preparing for his return flight back to Kolkata, and also to meet his wife as it's his first anniversary. He sees the news and gets tensed as weather conditions worsen both in Mumbai and Kolkata. On the other hand Kirti Sachdev is a flight attendant who is planning to quit flying after flying BOM-CCU sector which is her last flight accompanied by her friend and roommate Justin. The film also sees various passengers boarding this flight.

- Mr Dutta and his Wife who returning as their son has refused to keep them and he is also on his final stage of his life
- Afreen Hamidi a model and actress who is now quitting acting because of stiff between his Boyfriend.
- Kitty who is flying back to Kolkata to meet her father, as both her parents have separated because of some issues
- A boy who is unable to secure a job in Mumbai is flying to Kolkata to give his interview as he is unable to get train tickets because of limited time.
- A teenage couple ran away from home as their parents are against their relationship also boarded the flight.

Dibyendu and his copilot First Officer Neel and the rest flight crew of flight no OA511 after carrying out various inspections and walkaround finally prepare to takeoff. The ATC warns the OA511 of possible Turbulence during takeoff. As they taxi to the runway the crew commanded by Kirti carries the safety demo. as the flight takes off the aircraft faces turbulence. After much struggle the aircraft flies above the clouds finally free of turbulence as its flying 36,000 ft above sea level. As the aircraft reaches its designated height, refreshments are being served, Kirti enters the cockpit to serve refreshments to the flight crew, Neel notices Kirti behaving strange towards Dibyendu. The story then shifts a few years back when Kirti met Dibyendu for first time in Mumbai. And their friendship increased, Kirti started thinking more. Justin reveals that Kirti has become extremely, because of constant breakups and she is unable to find her true love. and she is also alcoholic, feeling guilty, decides to help her, finally Kirti gives up drinking, and their friendship also grows, but Kirti falls more in love for Dib. On Kirti's birthday, she tries to express her love for Dib, but Dibyendu backs out as they are just friends, Angered Kirti thinks that he loves someone else. Dibyendu then invites Kirti to attend a beach party which she attends. Much to her shock, she sees Dibyendu with a girl named Riya, heartbroken and frustrated, Kirti completely broke down in tears.

Meanwhile, in Kolkata, Riya is feeling unwell as she is struggling from panic attack. As the flight is approaching Kolkata, the aircraft suddenly faces hydraulic failure, damaging both the engines and resulting in crash, killing everyone. But it turned out to be a nightmare for Riya as her health condition is not good. In reality, the aircraft is on its final approach to Kolkata.

Film then shifts to another flashback, where it shows Dibyendu meeting Riya in a dance school, and after that their friendship turned into relationship, they get married. Meanwhile, Kirti angry and frustrated has again started drinking, as Riya has married Dib. Much to her disappointment, her friend Justin makes her understand it was another crush, but Kirti rebukes, claiming she was in love with Dib. On the same day, Kirti returns home in a drunken state. As Justin leaves. Kirti calls back to Dibyendu who was returning from a night out with Riya. Dib, after much hesitation, picks up the call of Kirti who is in drunken state. On asking what he is doing, Kirti eventually abuses Riya which angers Dib, and he disconnected the call. Riya realizes that it was Kirti asking him if she was drunk, Riya immediately realizes she might do something wrong in drunken state and calls Justin who after hearing about Kirti suddenly runs back to her apartment to find out Kirti tried to end her life. Next morning, Riya and Dibyendu fly to Mumbai after learning about Kirti condition. Riya tells Kirti to move on as she has a long way to live.

At the present, OA511 is on its approach to Kolkata, suddenly faces slow compression failure, i.e., leakage in the fuselage, forcing the aircraft to fly from 36,000 feet to 9,000, the area where the weather condition is bad. OA511 Crew request the ATC to divert the flight to any nearby airport, unfortunately all the airports are not available, forcing the crew to fly to Kolkata, but the plane is also running out of fuel. The news of aircraft facing problem gets viral in news channel claiming that aircraft can crash. OA511 finally begins its descent in Kolkata but overshoots the runway, panicking all the passengers. Kirti gets injured while trying to save a child from getting injured. The aircraft tries a second time to land, but this time they run out of fuel. Finally, they land safely. Tears of joy floats in passengers, crew and their family members. Dibyendu also receives a hero's welcome, after leaving the aircraft he meets Riya. Kirti arrives in the scene and apologies to Dibyendu and Riya. As she leaves, she hugs Dibyendu for the last time. She then goes for a date with copilot Neil. As Dibyendu and Riya leave the airport, she reveals she is pregnant, and he is going to become a father. Dibyendu feels extremely overjoyed by this news as they both leave home.

== Cast ==
- Dev as Captain Dibyendu Rakshit
- Koel as Mrs. Riya Dibyendu Rakshit
- Rukmini as Kirti Sachdev
- Prosenjit Chatterjee as Captain Dibakar Rakshit, Dibyendu's late father (flashback)
- Bulbuli Panja as Captain Dibakar Rakshit's wife/ Captain Dibyendu Rakshit's mother
- Ziaul Roshan as Neel Banerjee, Dibyendu's assistant
- Shataf Figar as air traffic controller
- Paran Bandopadhyay as Mr. Dutta
- Priyanka Sarkar as Afreen Hamidi
- Raj Chakraborty as Shanu Ghoshal
- Anindya Chatterjee as Kitty's Father
- Saayoni Ghosh as Monica / Kitty's mother
- Arshiya Mukherjee as Kitty
- Roja Paromita Dey as Justin, Kriti's friend and an air hostess
- Ambarish Bhattacharya as a passenger in the plane
- Nader Chowdhury as a passenger in the plane
- Abhisekh Singh as Ushnish
- Nasimul Haque
- Sonali Roy
- Diya Mukherjee
- Padmanava Dasgupta as TV news reporter
- Debomay Mukherjee as plane passenger
- Krishna Kishore Mukhopadhyay as Monica's father-in-law

== Production ==
The film is produced by Dev, his second production after his film Chaamp. When describing his reason for starring and producing in the film, Dev said "I am trying to do films that are offbeat yet commercial – ones that are out of the box. I can vouch for the concept of Cockpit. It is something no one has dealt with in the past. I am sure the audience will love it.".

=== Filming ===
Shooting for the film has taken place in Bangkok, Pattaya, Mumbai and Kolkata. The post-production of the film has been taking place in Mumbai.

== Release and reception ==
The film released on 22 September 2017 on the holiday of Durga Puja. In November 2017, it was announced by Bangladeshi film company Jaaz Multimedia that through an exchange of films with SVF Entertainment, Cockpit will release in Bangladesh.The release date of cockpit in Bangladesh is 8 December.

=== Critical reception ===
The Times of India gave the film a 4/5 star rating, calling it a must-watch film. In their review, The Times of India praised the film for exploring a new topic and leaving room for expanding the film into a franchise for other characters, which it described as a "rarity" in an industry full of remakes. While the performances of the main cast was praised, the review criticized Dev's delivery of his English dialogue, describing it as sometimes "barely understood". The heavy use of visual effects was also criticized for being unrealistic, but overall the film was praised in all other aspects from the acting to the music.

== Soundtrack ==
Cockpit (Original Motion Picture Soundtrack)

Soundtrack album by Arindom Chatterjee
- Released: 2017
- Genre: Feature film soundtrack
- Label: Zee Music Bangla
- Producer: Arindom Chatterjee

Arindom Chatterjee chronology
Bolo Dugga Maiki (2017)	Cockpit (2017)	Dhaka Attack (2017)

Singles from Cockpit (Original Motion Picture Soundtrack)
- 1. "Mithe Alo" Released: 23 August 2017; 2. "Bhalobasa Jaak" Released: 5 September 2017; 3. "Kolkatar Rasogolla" Released: 12 September 2017; 4. "Khela Shesh" Released: 19 September 2017

The soundtrack for the film has been composed by Arindom Chatterjee, except for the recomposed version of "Mithe Alo." The soundtrack contains four songs, including some sung by popular singers Atif Aslam and Arijit Singh. The first single, titled "Mithe Alo", was originally sung by Atif Aslam (in his Bengali debut) and Nikhita Gandhi and released on 23 August 2017. However, this version was a direct rip-off of the Spanish pop song ¡Corre! by Mexican duo Jesse & Joy, which featured in their 2011 album ¿Con Quién Se Queda El Perro?. Following a copyright infringement lawsuit, the song was recomposed by Amjad Nadeem Aamir and replaced by a new version sung by Arnab Dutta and Paroma Dasgupta. Atif Aslam's version was removed from all platforms, though some users who had downloaded the original track uploaded it to YouTube unofficially.

The second single from the album, "Bhalobasa Jaak", is sung by Arijit Singh and Somlata Acharyya Chowdhury and was released on 5 September. "Kolkatar Rasogolla" was released as a single on 12 September. "Khela Shesh" was released as the final single on 19 September. On 15 September, the soundtrack was officially released mid-air on a special flight, a first for a Tollywood soundtrack.

All music is composed by Arindom Chatterjee (except where noted).

No.	Title	Lyrics	Singer(s)	Length
1.	"Mithe Alo (Atif Aslam Version)" (Removed due to copyright issues)	Anindya Chatterjee	Atif Aslam and Nikhita Gandhi	04:57
2.	"Mithe Alo" (Recomposition by Amjad Nadeem Aamir)	Anindya Chatterjee	Arnab Dutta and Paroma Dasgupta	04:57
3.	"Bhalobasa Jaak"	Prasen (Prasenjit Mukherjee)	Arijit Singh and Somlata Acharyya Chowdhury	04:14
4.	"Kolkatar Rasogolla" (Originally composed by Bappi Lahiri)	Pulak Bandyopadhyay	Kavita Krishnamurthy and Stylebhai	4:28
5.	"Khela Shesh"	Kaushik Ganguly	Arijit Singh	4:52
6.	"Khela Shesh (Reprise)"	Kaushik Ganguly	Arijit Singh	4:10
Total length:				18:31

== World television premiere ==
The film premiered on television on 14 January 2018 in Zee Bangla and Zee Bangla Cinema.

== Accolades ==
The film was nominated for multiple awards at the 2018 Filmfare Awards East.

Year	Nominated work	Category	Award	Result	Notes	Ref.
2018	Kamaleswar Mukherjee	Best Director	Filmfare Award	Nominated	Filmfare Awards East	
2018	Rukmini Maitra	Best Actress	Filmfare Award	Nominated	Filmfare Awards East	
2018	Arijit Singh	Best Singer (Male)	Filmfare Award	Nominated	Filmfare Awards east for the film Cockpit	
2018	Rukmini Maitra	Best Debut (Female)	Filmfare Award	Won	Filmfare Awards East; Also for the film Chaamp	
