= Bojhena Shey Bojhena =

- Theatrical release poster
- Directed by: Raj Chakraborty
- Written by: M. Saravanan
- Based on: Engeyum Eppodhum by M. Saravanan
- Produced by: Srikant Mohta; Mahendra Soni
- Starring: Soham Chakraborty; Mimi Chakraborty; Abir Chatterjee; Payel Sarkar
- Cinematography: Subhankar Bhar
- Edited by: Bodhaditya Banerjee
- Music by: Indradeep Dasgupta; Arindam Chatterjee
- Production company: Shree Venkatesh Films
- Release date: 28 December 2012
- Running time: 145 minutes
- Country: India
- Language: Bengali

Bojhena Shey Bojhena (Bengali: বোঝেনা সে বোঝেনা; transl. They don't understand, they don't) is a 2012 Indian Bengali romantic drama film by Raj Chakraborty and produced by Shree Venkatesh Films. The film illustrates two love stories –The film explores how Noor Islam (Soham Chakraborty) draws Rhea Dutta (Mimi Chakraborty) into a complicated bond of interfaith love playing the characters in one of the stories and Abir Chatterjee & Payel Sarkar playing the other along with two buses – which join in the climax.

The film was initially titled Prem Amar 2 and was meant to serve a spiritual sequel to the 2009 film Prem Aamar. But eventually the director changed the name because of the entry of two new characters and a different storyline. The film's music is composed by debutante Arindam Chatterjee and Indraadip Dasgupta . The theatrical trailer was unveiled on 8 December 2012. It is a remake of the 2011 Tamil film Engaeyum Eppothum. The film emerged as a commercial success.

== Plot ==
The film starts with an accident. Then it flashes back several months before when Joyeeta, an educated and beautiful young girl from the city of Balurghat comes to Kolkata to give an interview for her work. But her sister who was supposed to guide her around the city could not come due to the stroke of her father-in-law. She takes help from a stranger boy named Abhik who bunks his job in order to help her but ends up spending the entire day with her. The next day Joyeeta returns to her village and soon realizes her love for Abhik. Meanwhile, in the city Abhik also realizes the same and starts planning to go to Balurghat to meet her.

Then a parallel story takes place where Noor Islam, a poor guy from the village of Murshidabad comes to Malda to find suitable work. Noor falls for the heavenly beauty and charm of a gorgeous young girl Rhea, who is an educated nurse by profession. Rhea happens to be Noor's neighbour and he watches her every morning for the last six months. One day Rhea meets Noor. Noor expresses his love for her. Rhea, however, is bold and independent, agrees to his love and commences to command him mercilessly. She puts him through several tests such as getting him to agree to organ donation, HIV testing, talking him to a police sub-inspector who is her father, fixing meeting with her former one-sided lover and so on. She wants him to decide on the basis of all that she's put him through as to whether he wants to marry her and spend the rest of his life with her. Noor responds affirmatively and the two grow to love each other unconditionally with the consent of their families.

Then the story flashes back to the present where Noor takes Rhea to meet his parents. They ride the same bus which is boarded by Abhik too who went to meet Joyeeta albeit he is returning as he could not find her address. Then another bus shows Joyeeta who is returning to Balurghat from Kolkata, where she went again to meet Abhik. Besides, it also shows a glimpse of a mother and her child, a girls' hockey team, a newly married couple, two college students who are attracted to each other and a man returning from Dubai to see his five-year-old daughter for the first time. As they are about to reach their destination, the buses collide head-on, creating a devastating accident. People rush to their aid. Noor ends up with a severe head injury and Rhea forces him to go to the hospital by an ambulance which was leaving. She stays back to help others as being a nurse, it was her job. Abhik also starts helping others. Finally he sees Joyeeta injured in another bus. At the hospital, Abhik confesses his love to Joyeeta at her bedside, and she manages to regain consciousness. The film ends with a tragic part as showing Noor and Joyeeta dead. The concluding scene shows Noor's body being taken away by a hysteric Rhea and his grieving parents while Abhik affectionately caresses the palm of a lifeless Joyeeta inside the ICU only to leave the hospital later, in grief. The site of the crash is declared an accident prone-area, and the film ends with few messages on road safety. One can never understand the reason behind what life has in store for them. Hence, the name: 'Bojhena Shey Bojhena'.

== Cast ==
- Soham Chakraborty as Noor Islam
- Mimi Chakraborty as Riya Dutta
- Abir Chatterjee as Abheek
- Payel Sarkar as Jayeeta
- Ena Saha as Priyanka
- Debomoy Mukherjee as Gourab
- Raj Chakraborty in cameo appearance
- Sancharee Mukherjee as taxi passenger
- Ashim Roy Chowdhury as Noor's boss
- Rumki Chatterjee as Noor's Mother
- Pradip Dhar as Man who posed as Goddess Kali
- Judhajit Banerjee as Co- Passenger
- Saibal Banerjee as Doctor
- Nayana Bandopadhyay as Jayeeta's friend
- Dhiman Bhattacharya as Noor's colleague
- Koushik Roy as Bus Co-Passenger
- Sushmita Dey as Bus Co-Passenger
- Madhumita Chakraborty as Riya's mother

== Soundtrack ==
The film's original soundtrack is composed by debutante Arindom Chatterjee whilst the background score and the title track is by Indraadip Dasgupta, and the lyrics have been penned by Prasen. The first single, named "Na Re Na" was released on YouTube on 1 December 2012, with an overwhelming response – Video on YouTube. The audio is released on V Music. Two songs ("Na Re Na" and "Bhogobaan") were adapted from the original Tamil soundtrack of Engaeyum Eppothum.

=== Track listing ===
| # | Title | Singer(s) | Lyrics | Music | Duration |
|---|---|---|---|---|---|
| 1 | "Na Re Na" | Arijit Singh | Prasen | Arindom Chatterjee | 4:07 |
| 2 | "Bhogoban" | Somlata Acharyya Chowdhury, Timir Biswas | Prasen | Arindom Chatterjee | 4:22 |
| 3 | "Kothin" | Ash King, Saayoni Ghosh | Prasen | Arindom Chatterjee | 4:44 |
| 4 | "Sajna" | Prashmita Paul | Prasen | Arindom Chatterjee | 4:47 |
| 5 | "Bojhena Shey Bojhena" (Male) | Arijit Singh | Prasen | Indraadip Dasgupta | 7:09 |
| 6 | "Bojhena Shey Bojhena" (Female) | Sukanya Ghosh | Prasen | Indraadip Dasgupta | 7:09 |
| 7 | "Sajna" (Reprise) | Arijit Singh | Prasen | Arindom Chatterjee | 3:11 |
