= Birsa Dasgupta =

Indian film director based in Tollywood

- Born: 2 November 1979 (age 46); Kolkata
- Occupation: film director
- Years active: 2010-Present
- Known for: Shudhu Tomari Jonyo; Byomkesh O Durgo Rahasya
- Spouse: Bidipta Chakraborty (m. 2010)
- Children: Mekhla Dasgupta, Ida Dasgupta
- Parent(s): Raja Dasgupta, Chaitalli Dasgupta
- Relatives: Harisadhan Dasgupta, Sonali Senroy Dasgupta, Sohag Sen, Ribhu Dasgupta

Birsa Dasgupta (born 2 November 1979) is an Indian Bengali film director based in Tollywood. He has directed films such as Shudhu Tomari Jonyo, Gangster, Mukhosh and Byomkesh O Durgo Rahasya.

== Early life ==
Born in Kolkata, his grandfather was documentary filmmaker Harisadhan Dasgupta, and grandmother was screenwriter Sonali (Senroy) Dasgupta, who later married Italian film director, Roberto Rossellini. His father is film director Raja Dasgupta, while his mother is television presenter and actress Chaitali Dasgupta. Ribhu Dasgupta is his only brother. He did his class 10 from South End School and class 12 from Delhi.

== Personal life ==
Birsa married Bengali actress, Bidipta Chakraborty. Birsa adopted Bidipta's daughter Meghna from her first marriage as his own. Birsa and Bidipta together have a daughter Ida Dasgupta who was a child artist in the film Shob Bhooturey.

== Career ==
Intending to learn film making, Dasgupta left his graduation midway and moved to Mumbai. Here he started assisting in serials and films. Thereafter, he started making fillers and promos for the newly established audiovisual division of publishing house, MiD DAY. In 2003, he became a unit director in Anurag Kashyap's film Black Friday (2004), though the film's release was stalled for further three years as it ran into troubles with Indian Censor Board. Nevertheless, the music video Dasgupta directed for the song Arey Ruk Ja Re Bandeh of the film soundtrack album, performed by band Indian Ocean, got him noticed.

Dasgupta returned to Kolkata in 2005, realising he would prefer making films in his native Bengali, thus made he went on make Bengali telefilms, Ekti Romharshak Dakatir Golpo and K, both made in 2006 for Bengali music channel, Tara Muzik. The film instantly got him acclaim, though a telefilm, Ekti Romharshak Dakatir Golpo , even took part in the Thrissur International Film Festival.

Eventually, Dasgupta made his feature film debut with, 033 in 2010. 033 is the STD code for Kolkata city, and the film was incidentally based on the theme of increasing youth migration outside Kolkata for career opportunities.

== Filmography ==
=== Films ===
Year	Title	Composer	Producer	Notes			
2010	Title	Composer	Producer	Notes	033	Chandrabindoo	Soumo Ganguly, Joy Ganguly
2011	Jaani Dekha Hobe	Indradeep Dasgupta, Neel Dutt	Namit Bajoria				
2014	Obhishopto Nighty	Indraadip Das Gupta	Shree Venkatesh Films				
2014	Golpo Holeo Shotti	Indraadip Das Gupta	Shree Venkatesh Films	Remake of Pizza			
2015	Shudhu Tomari Jonyo	Arindom Chatterjee	Shree Venkatesh Films	Remake of Raja Rani			
2016	Gangster	Arindom Chatterjee	Shree Venkatesh Films				
2017	One	Arindom Chatterjee	Shree Venkatesh Films	Remake of Thani Oruvan			
2017	Shob Bhooturey	Subho Pramanik	Shree Venkatesh Films				
2018	Crisscross	JAM8	Shree Venkatesh Films	Based on novel of same name by Smaranjit Chakraborty			
2019	Bibaho Obhijaan	Jeet Gannguli	Shree Venkatesh Films				
2021	Mukhosh		Shree Venkatesh Films	Remake of Anjaam Pathiraa			
2023	Byomkesh O Durgo Rahasya	Diptarka Bose	Dev Entertainment Ventures, Shadow Films	Based on Byomkesh Bakshi by Sharadindu Bandyopadhyay			

=== Web series ===
Year	Title	Cast	Network	Notes
2020	Mafia	Anindita Bose, Namit Das, Ridhima Ghosh, Ishaa Saha	ZEE5	
2020	Black Widows	Mona Singh, Swastika Mukherjee, Shamita Shetty, Parambrata Chatterjee	ZEE5	
2024	The Magic Of Shiri	Divyanka Tripathi, Jaaved Jaaferi, Namit Das, Darshan Jariwala, Nishank Verma, Parmeet Sethi	JioCinema	

== Television series ==
Mahanayak (TV series) was a Bengali television drama series on June 27, 2016, on Star Jalsha . The series starred Prosenjit Chatterjee, Paoli Dam, Tanushree Chakraborty, Priyanka Sarkar, Manali Dey, Biswanath Basu and Biswajit Chakraborty in lead roles.
