= Shudhu Tomari Jonyo =

2015 Indian Bengali film

- Poster
- Directed by: Birsa Dasgupta
- Written by: Debaloy Bhattacharya
- Story by: Atlee
- Produced by: Srikant Mohta; Mahendra Soni
- Starring: Dev; Srabanti Chatterjee; Soham; Mimi Chakraborty
- Cinematography: Subhankar Bhar
- Edited by: Subho Pramanik
- Music by: Indraadip Dasgupta; Arindam Chatterjee
- Production company: Shree Venkatesh Films
- Release date: 16 October 2015
- Running time: 149 minutes
- Country: India
- Language: Bengali

Shudhu Tomari Jonyo (transl. Only for You) is a 2015 Bengali romantic drama film directed by Birsa Dasgupta and produced by Shree Venkatesh Films. The film stars Dev, Srabanti Chatterjee, Soham and Mimi Chakraborty in the lead roles. It is a remake of the Tamil film Raja Rani (2013) which was reported to have been inspired by the 2007 Kannada movie Milana whereas Milana itself was loosely inspired from a Tamil film nenjathai killathe, which got remade in Bengali as Ki Kore Toke Bolbo four months after the release of this movie.

== Cast ==
- Dev as Adi Sen
- Srabanti Chatterjee as Nayantara Sen
- Soham Chakraborty as Siraz Chowdhury
- Mimi Chakraborty as Koli
- Biswanath Basu as Chandan
- Sneha Chatterjee as Sreetama
- Arindam Sil as Nayantara's father
- Supriyo Dutta as Siraz's father
- Kharaj Mukherjee as Kangsho Mama, Chandan's maternal uncle
- Kanchan Mullick as Rohan
- Pallavi Chatterjee as Nayantara's aunt
- Manasi Sinha as Kangsho's wife
- Ashim Roy Chowdhury as Chapal
- Pradip Dhar as Bhabha
- Nilanjan Dutta
- Poddanab Dasgupta
- Debprotim Dasgupta as Chhoto Bhonda
- Trina Saha as Adi's relative

== Soundtrack ==
The soundtrack was composed by Arindom Chatterjee and Indraadip Das Gupta. The song "Hey Baby" from the Tamil version of the movie was retained in this film, titled as "Dekhte Bou Bou". The track "Egiye De" is inspired by the song Coming home.

No.	Title	Music	Singer(s)	Length
1.	"Egiye De"	Arindam Chatterjee	Arijit Singh, Madhubanti Bagchi	04:13
2.	"Jeno Tomari Kache"	Arindom Chatterjee	Ash King, Somlata Acharyya Chowdhury	04:36
3.	"Emotional Saiyaan"	Arindom Chatterjee	Arijit Singh, Shalmali Kholgade, Bob	03:49
4.	"Shudhu Tomari Jonno (Title Track)"	Indraadip Das Gupta	Arijit Singh, Shreya Ghoshal	03:28
5.	"Dekhte Bou Bou"	Arindom Chatterjee	Ash King, Prashmita Paul	03:11
6.	"Egiye De (Female Version)"	Arindom Chatterjee	Somlata Acharyya Chowdhury	04:26
7.	"Egiye De (Reprise Version)"	Arindom Chatterjee	Arijit Singh	03:54
Total length:				26:17

== Release ==
The film was released in the theatres on 16 October 2015, coinciding with Durga Puja 2015. It is scheduled for a re-release on 7 February 2025 on the occasion of Valentine's Week, to mark 10 years of the film.

== Reception ==
=== Critical reception ===
Jaya Biswas of the Times of India rated the film 3 out of 5 stars and opined "The trouble with the film is that unlike the original, it takes off on a boring note. However, there are quite a few smart lines that elicit a good laugh." Although she praised the peppy music, Dev's acting and the comedy but bemoaned the excessive screen time given to the flashbacks, Dev's diction and a predictable climax.

- Anandolok Magazine 4.25/5
