= Arindom Chatterjee =

Indian music director

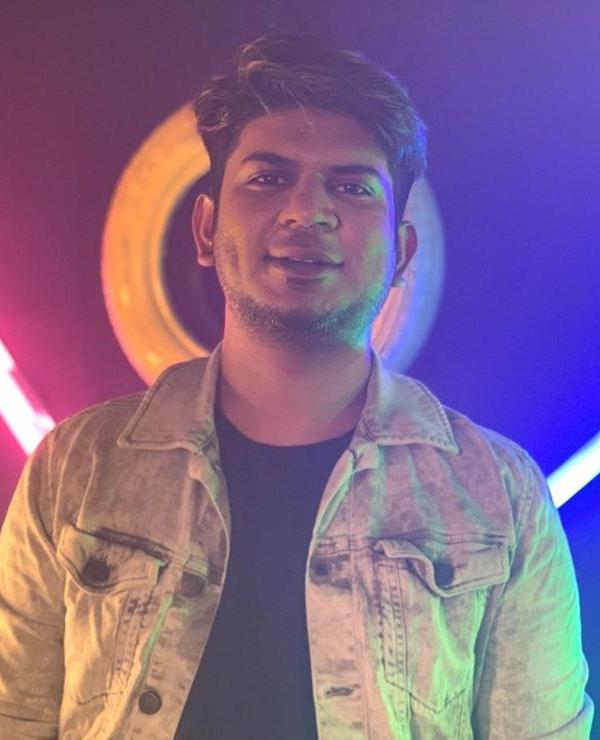

Background information
- Born: Kolkata, India
- Occupations: Music director, singer, composer
- Instruments: Guitar, Vocals

Arindom Chatterjee, also known by the mononym Arindom, is an Indian music director, singer, and composer noted for his work on Bengali movies. His 2012 debut movie, Bojhena Shey Bojhena, won Best Album of the Year. In addition to movies, Arindom has composed title tracks and music for scores of Bengali television, including Thik Jeno Love Story.

In May 2014, Arindom composed the official theme song, "Atlético De Kolkata" for the Indian Super League, Fatafati Football. In August 2019, East Bengal Football Club approached Arindom to compose their Centenary Anthem, the result of which is "Eksho Bochor Dhore," sung by Arijit Singh.

== Career ==
Arindom debut compositions were in the television shows Nayika and Josh, on Sananda TV in 2011. His launch as a music composer in movies came through Bojhena Shey Bojhena. The album of Bojhena Shey Bojhena won the Mirchi Music Awards Best Album of The Year in 2013. In 2017, Arindom composed the score for Dhaka Attack and in 2019 he worked with the Bangladeshi singer Minar Rahman for the song ‘Eka Din’ from the movie Fidaa. In 2018, he composed the song 'Bhutu Bhaijaan' for the children's movie Haami.

Arindom has worked with Bollywood singers like Vishal Dadlani and Raftaar for the title track of the Tollywood film One (2017). The same year, he composed 'Mithe Alo' for the Bengali movie Cockpit. Arindom's second film, Borbaad, released in 2014 including 'Parbona', sung by Arijit Singh and 'Borbad Hoyechi Ami'. In 2020, Arindom's composed 'Shuney Ne' from the movie Love Aaj Kal Porshu (2020).

== Bengali discography ==
Denotes films that have not yet been released

Year	Film	Songs	Notes
2012	Bojhena Shey Bojhena	Bhogoban, Kothin, Saajna, Sajna – Reprise, Na Re Na	Debut
2013	Bangla Naache Bhangra	College Song	Guest Composer
2014	Bindaas	Bhalobeshe Kono Bhool Korini Aami	Guest Composer
2014	Borbaad	All songs	
2015	Amanush 2	All songs	
2015	Shudhu Tomari Jonyo	All songs except Shudhu Tomari Jonno (title track)	
2016	Gangster	All songs	
2017	One	All songs	
2017	Bolo Dugga Maiki	All songs	
2017	Cockpit	All songs	
2017	Dhaka Attack	Tup Tap	Guest Composer
2018	Haami	Bhutu Bhaijaan	Guest Composer
2018	Fidaa	All songs	
2018	Generation Ami	All songs	
2019	East Bengal FC	100 Bochor Dhore	Official Centenary Theme Song
2020	Love Aaj Kal Porshu	All songs	
2020	Majhe Majhe Tobo	Single	Composer/Singer
2022	Thik Jyano Love Story 2.0	Single	Composer/Singer
2023	RNT Project	Music Album/Non Film	Composer
2023	Shastry Virudh Shastry	Dil Karey Badmashiyan/Unreleased	Guest Composer

== Awards ==
- Won ‘Best Album of the Year’ award at the Mirchi Music Awards for the film Bojhena Shey Bojhena in 2013
- Won the ‘Popular Choice Best Album’ award for the film Gangster at the Mirchi Music Awards in 2017
- Won the ‘Popular Choice: Best Song’ award for ‘Thik Emon Ebhabe’ from the movie Gangster at the Mirchi Music Awards in 2017
