= One (2017 film) =

2017 Indian film

- One Movie Poster
- Directed by: Birsa Dasgupta
- Written by: Mohan Raja
- Starring: Yash Dasgupta; Nusrat Jahan; Prasenjit Chatterjee
- Music by: Arindam Chatterjee
- Production company: Shree Venkatesh Films
- Distributed by: Shree Venkatesh Films
- Release date: 14 April 2017
- Running time: 148 min.
- Country: India
- Language: Bengali

One is a 2017 Indian Bengali language action thriller film directed by Birsa Dasgupta under the banner of Shree Venkatesh Films. The film stars Yash Dasgupta, Nusrat Jahan in the lead roles and Prosenjit Chatterjee in the antagonist role. It is a remake of Tamil film Thani Oruvan (2015). The movie was released on 14 April 2017 all over the theatres in India.

== Plot ==
Ranajay and his friends are trainee policemen who are also self-appointed vigilantes at night. Aditya Sen, an exceptionally cunning and prodigious scientist, owns and runs a pharmaceutical empire. The national mafia and contract killer work on Aditya's word. Ranajay, with his sharp thinking and instincts, is suspicious of Aditya over several seemingly unconnected criminal events and secretly carries out an unofficial investigation. Trouble mounts when Aditya becomes suspicious of his intentions and murders Ronojoy's friend Abhijeet, an honest policeman. Later, Ranajay learns that Aditya can detect all his plans via satellite communications, and he misdirects Aditya into killing Vicky. Ranajay later collected all the pieces of evidence against Aditya and completely shattered him. At last, it is shown that Aditya died because of a gunshot from his girlfriend, and he handed over all the secret information against the ministers, which would be helpful as evidence/proofs in the future.

== Cast ==
- Yash Dasgupta as Ranajay Bose IPS
- Prosenjit Chatterjee as Aditya Sen, the main antagonist
- Nusrat Jahan as Megha
- Supriyo Dutta as MLA-turned Minister Gobardhan Sen, Aditya's father
- Rajat Ganguly as Chief Minister
- Bharat Kaul as leader of the dock syndicate, Damodar Pandey
- Arjun Chakrabarty as Abhijeet IPS
- Rajib Bose
- Abhishek Bose
- Anil Kuriakose as Kamlesh Tripathi, Coal mafia
- Rachel White as Bipasha, Aditya's girlfriend
- Aryann Roy as Vicky
- Debdoot Ghosh as Ashok Ganguly, Pharmaceutical industry head
- Bulbuli Panja
- Satyam Bhattacharya
- Frederico Machado Freitas
- Krishnendu Adhikari

== Soundtrack ==
One

Soundtrack album by Arindom Chatterjee
- Released: 2017
- Genre: Feature film soundtrack
- Length: 12:27
- Language: Bengali
- Label: SVF

All lyrics are written by Prasen (Prasenjit Mukherjee); all music is composed by Arindam Chatterjee.

Track listing
No.	Title	Singer(s)	Length
1.	"Aladdin"	Shalmali Kholgade	04:34
2.	"One" (Title Track)	Vishal Dadlani and Raftaar	03:21
3.	"Jodi Bolo"	Arijit Singh	04:32
Total length:			12:27
