= Soumyajit Majumdar =

Indian actor

- Born: Kolkata
- Occupations: Actor, Director, Producer

Soumyajit Majumdar is an Indian actor, director and producer. He is mostly known for his roles in Aashiqui 2 (2013), Har Har Byomkesh (2015), Gangster (2016), Kiriti Roy (2016), Te3n (2016) and Ghost of the Golden Groves (2019). He has also produced Bengali language film Homecoming (2022).

== Early life and education ==
He was born in Kolkata. He completed his education in mass communication and videography from St. Xaviers College Kolkata.

== Career ==
He started his career by playing a cameo in a Bengali film Gandu in 2010. Majumdar made an entry into the Hindi film industry by playing a role in Mohit Suri's Aashiqui 2 in 2013, featuring Aditya Roy Kapur and Shraddha Kapoor. In 2015, he was roped in for Har Har Byomkesh, a Bengali mystery thriller by Arindam Sil. In 2016, he featured in a Hindi film Te3n by Ribhu Dasgupta, starring Amitabh Bachchan, Nawazuddin Siddiqui and Vidya Balan. In the same year, he played a role in Birsa Dasgupta's Gangster and Aniket Chattopadhyay's Kiriti Roy. In 2019, he starred in Ghost of the Golden Groves movie, which also premiered at the London Indian Film Festival.

In 2022, he directed and produced his first Bengali film Homecoming, featuring Sayani Gupta, Hussain Dalal and Plabita Borthakur. It was released on SonyLiv on 18 February 2022. It won the award for Best Film at the 19th annual South Asian International Film Festival, New York and Best Asian Film at Tokyo Film Awards. It was also the opening film at the Gange Sur Seine Film Festival held from 5–8 October 2023. Soumyajit won the best director award for Homecoming at the Gange Sur Seine Film Festival in Paris. In 2023, he started making a biopic on iconic Bengali Baul artist Parvathy Baul.

== Awards and nominations ==
Year	Award	Category	Result	Ref.(s)
2023	Gange Sur Seine Film Festival	Best Director	Won	
