= Ghost of the Golden Groves =

- English-language release poster
- Directed by: Aniket Dutta; Roshni Sen
- Based on: A short story by Bibhutibhushan Bandyopadhyay ("Maya")
- Starring: Joyraj Bhattacharya; Soumyajit Majumdar
- Cinematography: Basab Mullick
- Edited by: Nikon Basu
- Music by: Aniket Dutta
- Release dates: 22 June 2019 (London Indian Film Festival); 16 October 2019 (Festival du Nouveau Cinema Montreal)
- Running time: 98 minutes
- Country: India
- Language: Bengali

Ghost of the Golden Groves (Bengali: সোনাঝুরির ভূত, romanized: Shonajhurir Bhoot) is a critically acclaimed 2019 Indian Bengali-language Experimental horror fantasy film directed by Aniket Dutta and Roshni Sen (known collectively as "Harun-Al-Rashid" after the caliph of the same name). The film consists of two stories, the second of which is loosely based on a short story by Bibhutibhushan Bandyopadhyay. The film stars Joyraj Bhattacharjee and Bibhuti Soumyajit Majumdar.

Ghost of the Golden Groves premiered on 22 June 2019 at the London Indian Film Festival. and in October at the Festival du nouveau Cinema Montreal where the film was nominated for the FIPRESCI(International Federation of Film Critics) award. In 2020, it won the top award at Chicago underground film festival

== Cast ==
- Joyraj Bhattacharjee as Promotho
- Soumyajit Majumdar as Bibhuti
- Debleena Sen
- Bidyut Das as Komol Mete
- Jayanta Banerjee as Nibaran Chakraborty

== Release ==
Ghost of the Golden Groves had its premiere on 22 June 2019 at the London Indian Film Festival. It later screened on 16 and 17 October 2019 at the Festival du nouveau cinéma in Canada. It had its USA premiere on March 5, 2020, at Cinequest and it went on to play at numerous film festivals.

== Reception ==
Anton Bitel, in his review of the film for Sight & Sound, called it "Beautifully framed and shot [...] an elegant yet absurd diptych of supernatural tales whose odd parallels and asymptotic connections only add to their unsettling sense of illogic." J. Hurtado of Screen Anarchy called the film "a challenging watch, for sure. The pacing is a bit slow and the material is quite obtuse for the most part, making mainstream breakthrough a tough road. However, film fans who like to be challenged will find plenty to dissect and enjoy." J.Berra of Screen International wrote on VCINEMA that "Ghost of the Golden Groves is a true one-off" and listed it as one of the best Asian films of 2019.Senses of Cinema called it "a gateway into a wildly original artistic vision".
