= 2010 Deganga riots =

Religious clashes in West Bengal, India

The 2010 Deganga riots occurred at Deganga, North 24 Parganas in West Bengal, India on 6 September 2010 by local Muslim against Hindu community over a disputed land. The violence began late in the evening of that Monday and continued throughout the night and for several subsequent days. The district police, Rapid Action Force, paramilitary were all unable to quell the problems and the Indian Army was eventually deployed. The army staged a series of flag marches on the Taki Road but the violence continued in the interior villages lying off that road until Thursday, despite the army presence and the promulgation of prohibitory orders under section 144 of the Criminal Procedure Code. Military Commanders on approval by the state Government imposed AFSPA.

== Background ==
Deganga is a Community Development Block (CDB) in North 24 Parganas district, India with a Muslim-majority population that is part of the Basirhat parliamentary constituency. While the Communist Party of India (Marxist) (CPI(M)) historically represented the constituency, the seat was won by Haji Nurul Islam of the Trinamul Congress in the Indian general elections of 2009.

The CDB had remained calm during what journalist Partha Dasgupta described as "the two most trying times in recent history", being the Babri Masjid incident of 1992 and the Gujarat riots of 2002 in this situation CPI(M) did the best work to control the violence.

== Riots ==
The flashpoint for the riots related to a dispute on land at Chattal Pally village that was formerly owned by Rani Rashmoni. On this was a Muslim cemetery and also a place of Hindu worship that had been used for annual Durga Puja celebrations for many years. (Note: The Pioneer on one occasion stated that the Durga Puja had been celebrated for 25 years, and in another report put the figure at 40 years.) The two areas, near to which was situated a police station, were separated by a narrow pathway and news reports variously claimed that members of the Muslim community had begun to excavate that pathway on the morning of 6 September 2010, or had been constructing a wall there. There were claims that the action was an attempt to stop the Durga Puja from taking place and that the Hindu community had been constructing a "makeshift structure" (a pandal adjacent to their temple) by the boundary of the cemetery. Underlying the immediate cause was resentment relating to use of a loudspeaker by a local mosque: the Kolkata High Court was at that time in the process of adjudicating on the issue and had prevented its use while doing so, and there was a belief that Haji Nurul Islam had gained votes in the 2009 elections by promising to support those who favoured its use.

Members of the Hindu community objected to the works being carried out on 6 September. Some news reports indicated that the objectors were attacked for doing so, while others stated that the attacks began when the police intervened. The police tactics involved use of a lathicharge and resulted in the arrest of three or four Muslims. The Muslim community retaliated first by establishing a road-block and then, in the evening, by marching as a mob to protest at the police station and to possibly to free those who were in custody. Shops and other property belonging to Hindus were looted, burned, torched and destroyed, as were various vehicles on the road, including some belonging to the police and also buses. Claims were made that this mob of around 500 people was led by Haji Nurul Islam, although other "local thugs" and anti socials were also named among the leaders. The troubles spread to the nearby areas of Kadambagachi and Beliaghata, and two Hindu temples were also desecrated.

The disruption continued overnight and into Tuesday morning. The police, who were outnumbered by the mob, had been augmented by the Rapid Action Force (RAF) and then by paramilitary reinforcements from Kolkata as the number of reported injured people rose to at least 24. A curfew was also put in place, using powers available under Section 144 of the Criminal Procedure Code. With the RAF, paramilitary also finding themselves to be outnumbered and unable fully to control matters, the central government sent in the Army. The force, which was variously reported to comprise 200 and 400 personnel, conducted route marches in the area.

The violence was worsened by the death of a youth who had been shot by one of the rioters. Although the Trinamool Party had refused to take part in meetings intended to resolve the riots, Haji Nurul Islam refuted claims that members of his party were protecting the rioters and explained that they were instead trying to pacify those involved. The violence continued on Wednesday morning, 8 September, with one incident involving a mob from Ramnathpur and Khejurdanga attacking houses in the Salimpukur and Hospital area, off the Taki Road that runs through the district. They ransacked 23 houses, causing their victims to take shelter in nearby Kartikpur. The Armed Forces Special Powers Act was imposed. Small Arms and tear gas was used. Nonetheless, state officials claimed that the situation was gradually coming under control and they announced a compensation scheme for those who had lost property.

A later news report, published on Friday 10 September, noted that at least 250 shops had been looted during the several days of rioting, while 50 houses had been burned and 5 temples desecrated. The mob had also hoisted a loudspeaker at the mosque near Deganga market, violating the High Court order.

Sporadic incidents continued as late as Thursday but had calmed by Friday. The army and various law enforcement bodies remained in place while the Muslim festival of Eid was celebrated on Saturday 11 September, by which time the Trinamool Congress and the CPI(M) had announced their plans for a peace meeting on 13 September that would involve various religious leaders. The two parties claimed that the troublemakers had come into the area from other villages.

== Aftermath ==
On 9 September, a delegation of Bharatiya Janata Party (BJP) leaders visited the areas and on the following day the BJP demanded the arrest of Haji Nurul Islam for instigating the mob into a communal frenzy. A First Information Report had been filed against him. Subsequently, a Hindu advocacy group Hindu Samhati (HS), led by a former member of the Rashtriya Swayamsevak Sangh, Tapan Ghosh, pressed claims that there had been attacks on Hindu women, torture and other atrocities. The Vishva Hindu Parishad (VHP), an international organisation of Hindus, also took up the issue with local authorities, based on calligraphy and other evidence, that the riots were masterminded by the CPI(M) with the intent of garnering votes in an area where the Muslim community had in recent years grown to a majority status and were moving towards right-wing hardliner Islamic parties and away from the left parties.

As with other politicians, Haji Nurul Islam could offer no explanation for the death of the Hindu youth, who had ventured into the area from his home village of Falti and whose family were being generally shunned in the aftermath of the events. He challenged the claims laid against him, saying

The episode is designed to malign my secular credentials. I have information that CPM goons Yakub and Netai led the loot and arson ... I am not a newcomer. I rose through the panchayat ranks. I have been involved in most of the pujas here over the years. Many Hindu victims celebrated Eid at my house. Thank God no one lost their lives. Property can be compensated, but not life.

In October 2010, the National Human Rights Commission of India, which is an autonomous statutory body, requested the Government of West Bengal to supply information regarding the riots, allegedly in response to a complaint filed by the All India Legal Aid Forum, who were concerned about the police response to the incident.
