= Chand Mohammad =

Chand Mohammad may refer to:

- Chander Mohan or Chand Mohammad, member of the Haryana Legislative Assembly
- Chand Mohammad (West Bengal politician), member of the West Bengal Legislative Assembly
