= Padmavati Rao =

Indian actress, theatre personality

- Born: 1963; Delhi, India
- Other names: Akshatha Rao, Pinty
- Occupations: Actress; theatre activist
- Years active: 1978 - present
- Family: Arundathi Nag (sister)

Padmavati Rao, credited as Akshatha Rao in Kannada films, is an Indian actress, theatre personality, poet, dancer and translator. She is known for her theatre activities and performances in Ondanondu Kaladalli (1978), Geetha (1981), Pardes (1997), Padmaavat (2018), and Tanhaji (2020).

== Personal life ==
Padmavati was born in Delhi. She is the sister of actress Arundhati Nag.

== Career ==
Film career

Rao's debut movie was 1978 Kannada film Ondanondu Kaladalli, directed by Girish Karnad. In 1981, she played the title role of Geetha in the film Geetha, directed by Shankar Nag. She went on to appear in movies including Pardes and Padmaavat. She played Amitabh Bacchan's wife in the critically acclaimed film Te3n, directed by Ribhu Dasgupta. She performed as Jijabai, mother of Shivaji, in the 2020 film Tanhaji.

Theatre career

Rao's career was started with theatre activities. She has conducted and performed plays and workshops across India. She first acted in theatre under the direction of Shankar Nag. She assisted him in Malgudi Days as assistant director, also acted and dubbed for the same project. In her theatre career, Rao has worked with Girish Karnad, M. S. Sathyu, Ramesh Talwar, Shaukat Azmi, A. K. Hanagal and many other theatre personalities. Her theatre work Kitchen Poems, a solo performance, was much appreciated. She has been doing theatre activities for children.

== Filmography ==
Year	Film	Role	Language	Notes
1978	Ondanondu Kaladalli	Savanthri	Kannada	Debut film
1981	Geetha	Geetha	Kannada	
1997	Pardes	Narmada	Hindi	
2016	Te3n	Nancy	Hindi	
2018	Ek Sangaychay		Marathi	
2018	Padmaavat	Kunwar Baisa	Hindi	
2018	Phamous	Lall's mother	Hindi	
2019	Pranaya Meenukalude Kadal	Bini Noorjehan	Malayalam	
2020	Tanhaji	Jijabai	Hindi	
2020	Raat Akeli Hai	Pramila Singh	Hindi	
2021	Maara	Meenakshi/Mary Aunty	Tamil	Amazon Prime Video Film
2023	Sweet Kaaram Coffee	Deva	Tamil	Amazon Prime Video Web Series
2025	Nodidavaru Enanthare	Kranti Devi	Kannada	
