= Sheikh Rabiul Islam =

Indian politician

Member of West Bengal Legislative Assembly
- In office 23 November 2024 – 4 May 2026
- Preceded by: Haji Nurul Islam
- Succeeded by: Abdul Matin Muhammad
- Constituency: Haroa

Personal details
- Party: Trinamool Congress
- Parent: Haji Nurul Islam (father)
- Profession: Politician

Sheikh Rabiul Islam is an Indian politician from West Bengal. He is a member of the West Bengal Legislative Assembly since 2024, representing Haroa Assembly constituency as a Member of the Trinamool Congress.

He is the son of the late Haji Nurul Islam a former Member of Parliament, Lok Sabha from Basirhat.

== See also ==
- List of chief ministers of West Bengal
- West Bengal Legislative Assembly
