= Nusrat Jahan =

Indian actress and politician

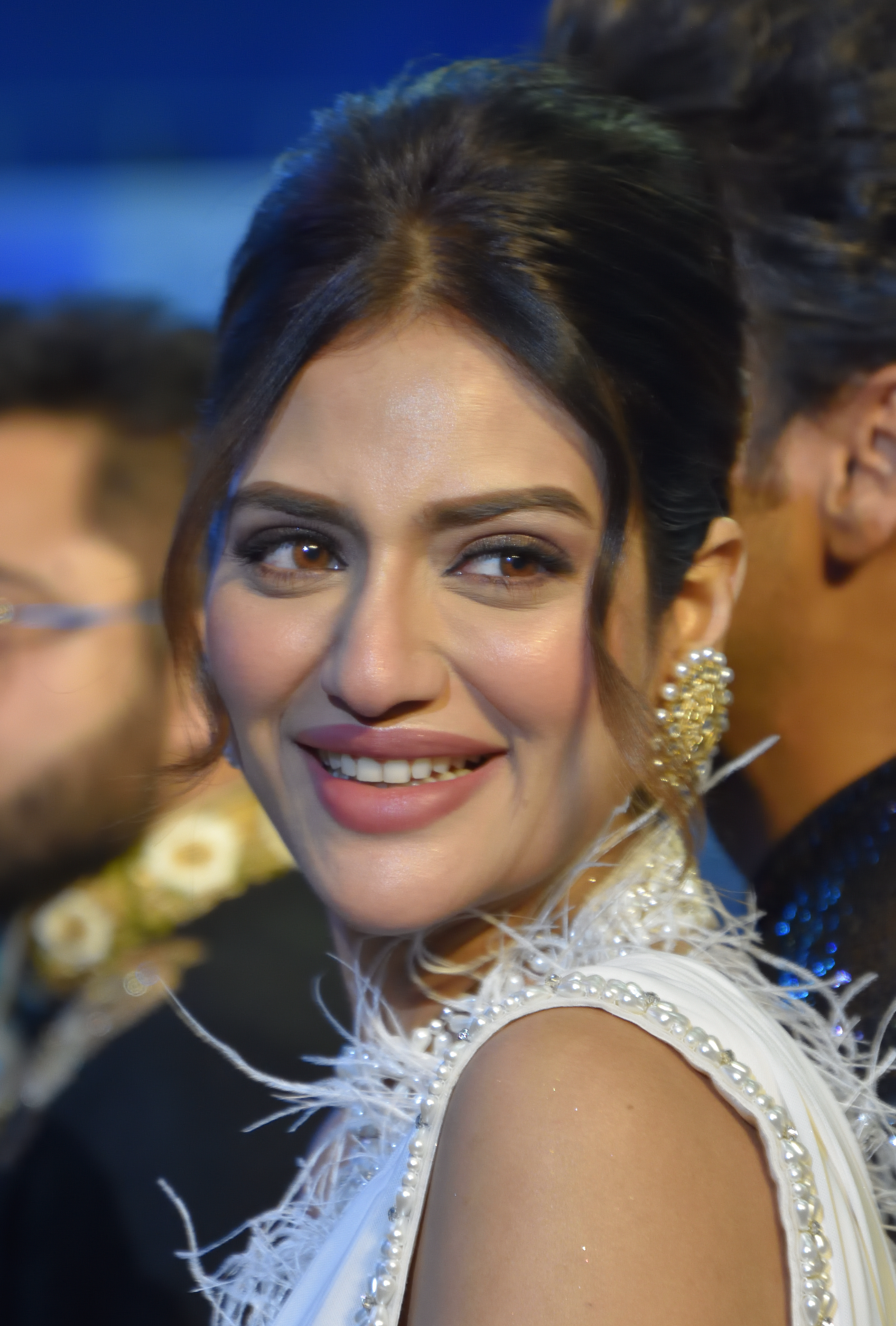
- Jahan at the 29th Kolkata International Film Festival in December 2023

Member of Parliament, Lok Sabha
- In office 24 May 2019 – 4 June 2024
- Preceded by: Idris Ali
- Succeeded by: Haji Nurul Islam
- Constituency: Basirhat

Personal details
- Born: Nusrat Jahan Ruhi; 8 January 1990 (age 36) Calcutta, West Bengal, India
- Party: Trinamool Congress (2019–24)
- Education: B.Com
- Alma mater: Bhawanipur Education Society College
- Occupations: Actress; model; producer; politician
- Years active: 2010–present
- Organization: YD Films
- Notable work: Shotru; Khiladi; Crisscross; Asur
- Spouses: Nikhil Jain (m. 2019; ann. 2020); Yash Dasgupta (m. 2020)
- Children: 1
- Awards: Mahanayika; Miss Kolkata 2010

Nusrat Jahan Ruhi (born 8 January 1990) is an Indian actress, producer and former politician who predominantly works in Bengali cinema. Beside the acting career, from 2019 to 2024, Jahan has represented as the Member of Parliament, Lok Sabha from Basirhat constituency as a Trinamool Congress candidate. Jahan's screen debut was in Raj Chakraborty's Shotru.

== Early life and education ==
Nusrat Jahan was born on 8 January 1990 into a Bengali Muslim family in Calcutta (now Kolkata), West Bengal, India to Muhammed Shah Jahan and Sushma Khatun on 8 January 1990. She completed her schooling from Our Lady Queen of the Missions School, Kolkata and then went to college in Bhawanipur College, Kolkata graduating with a Bachelor of Commerce (Honours) degree.

== Career ==
=== Acting career ===
Jahan started her modelling career after winning the beauty contest, "Fair One Miss Kolkata" in 2010.

She made her Tollywood debut in the 2011 film, Shotru alongside Jeet. After a year's hiatus, she starred in her second film, Khoka 420 (2013), with Dev. The same year she appeared in Khiladi, opposite Ankush Hazra. She appeared in two item songs, "Chicken Tandoori" from Action and "Desi Chhori" from Yoddha - The Warrior, both of which were hits and became chartbusters. Jahan then appeared in Sondhey Namaar Aagey, with Rahul Bose, Rituparna Sengupta and Payel Sarkar.

In 2015, she featured in the comedy film, Jamai 420, opposite Ankush Hazra, with an ensemble cast including Payel Sarkar, Mimi Chakraborty, Soham Chakraborty and Hiran Chatterjee. Jahan was also a part of the theme song of BCL (Bengal Celebrity League) for the team "Midnapoor Mighities", with Dev and Sayantika Banerjee. Her next and last film of 2015 was Har Har Byomkesh, with Abir Chatterjee, Sohini Sarkar and Rachel White released in December 2015. The movie was a huge box office success.

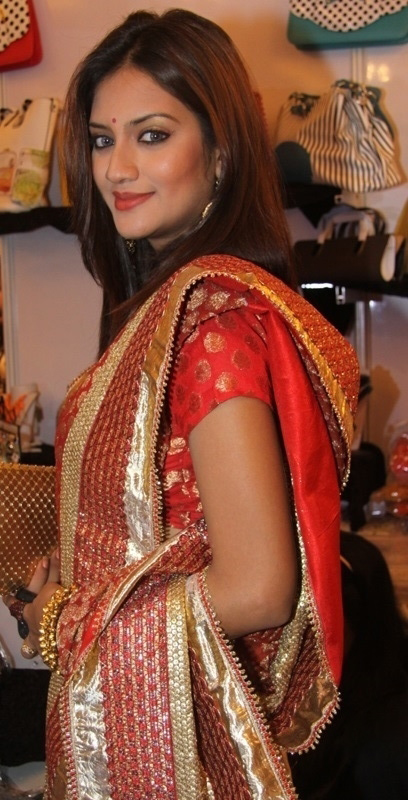
Jahan at FIERAA, a fashion and lifestyle exhibition held at Calcutta

In 2016, she appeared in director Rajiv Kumar Biswas' film Power, with Jeet and Sayantika Banerjee. That same year, she starred in the comedy film Kelor Kirti, with Dev, Jisshu Sengupta, Ankush Hazra, Mimi Chakraborty, Koushani Mukherjee and Sayantika Banerjee. Later that year, she was seen in Love Express, opposite Dev and after that in Zulfiqar, directed by Srijit Mukherji with a cast including Prosenjit Chatterjee, Kaushik Sen, Parambrata Chatterjee, Dev, Ankush Hazra, Jisshu Sengupta, and Paoli Dam. Zulfiqar was among the top earning films of 2016. She ended 2016 with the comedy film Haripada Bandwala, with Ankush Hazra under the direction of Pathikrit Basu.

She was first seen in 2017, in One, with Prosenjit Chatterjee and Yash Dasgupta, directed by Birsa Dasgupta. In May 2017, her next film Ami Je Ke Tomar, with Ankush Hazra and Sayantika Banerjee was released. On 22 September 2017, Bolo Dugga Maiki, along with Ankush Hazra was released.

Jahan took a guest role in the 2018 film Uma followed by a role in Crisscross, directed by Birsa Dasgupta, and featuring Mimi Chakraborty, Priyanka Sarkar, Sohini Sarkar and Jaya Ahsan. After that, Rajiv Kumar Biswas selected her for the film Naqaab with Shakib Khan and Sayantika Banerjee. She danced in the song Joy Joy Durga Maa composed and featured by Jeet Gannguli, cricketer Sourav Ganguly, actress Subhashree Ganguly, Mimi Chakraborty and actor Bonny Sengupta were shown in the screen. This was released on the behalf of Captain TMT Bar as a promotion.

In 2020, she appeared in Asur, with Jeet and Abir Chatterjee and then in an action film on hostage rescue operation SOS Kolkata as ATS technical head Amanda Jones along with Yash Dasgupta, Mimi Chakraborty, Ena Saha and Shantilal Mukherjee.

In 2025, Jahan made a cameo appearance in the Bangladeshi film Borbaad, featuring in the song Chand Mama. The appearance marked her on-screen reunion with Shakib Khan following the success of Naqaab (2018) and marked her return to item numbers after a decade. The performance received widespread attention, along with praise for both Khan and her performances.

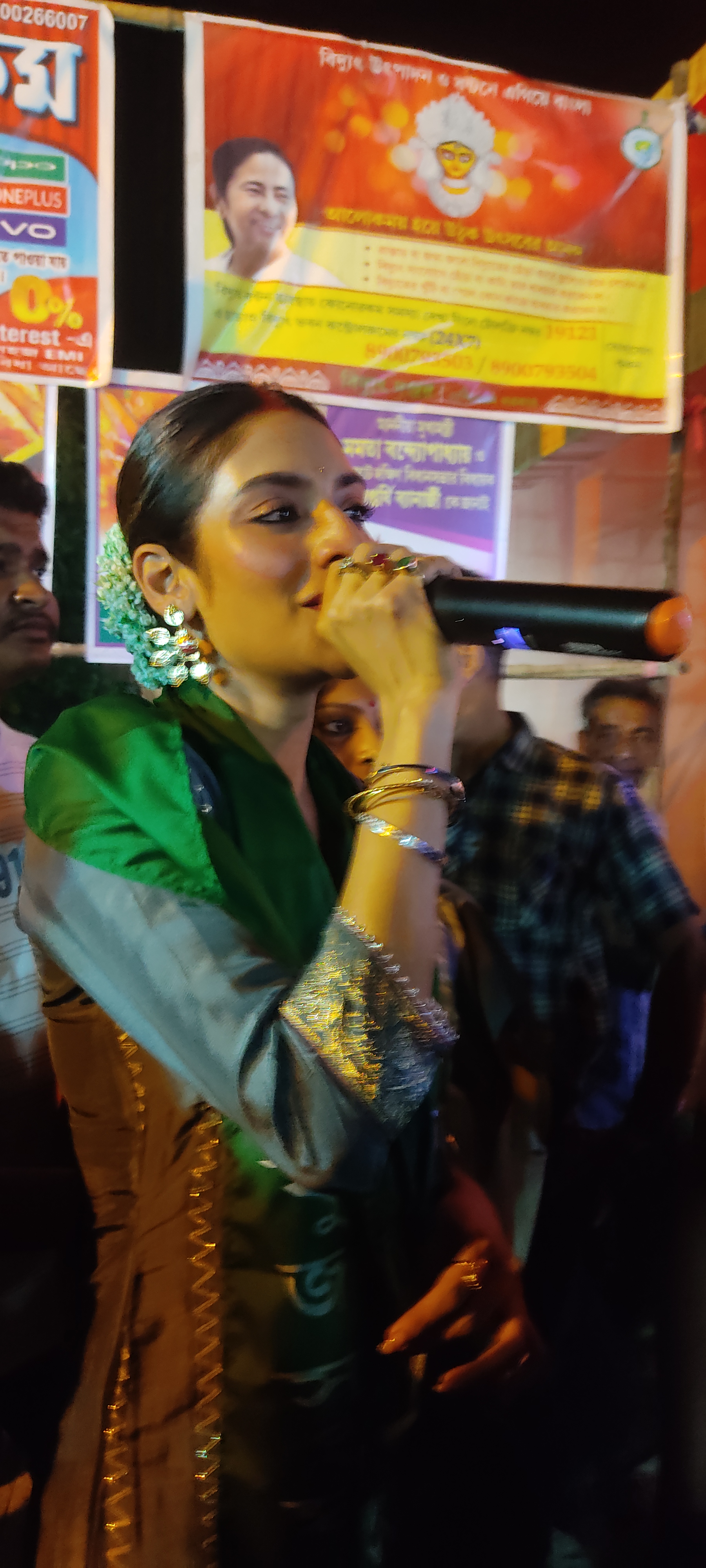
Jahan in Basirhat

=== Political career ===
On 12 March 2019, the Chief Minister of West Bengal and president of Trinamool Congress party, Mamata Banerjee announced that Jahan would contest the general election of 2019 from Basirhat Lok Sabha Constituency. She emerged as the winner by a margin of 350,000 votes against BJP candidate Sayantan Basu.

== Personal life ==
Jahan was in a relationship with Kader Khan for about "three or four" years. In 2012, he was implicated in the gang rape of Suzette Jordan. Jahan maintained that they broke up 5 months before the incident and that they remained good friends afterwards. A concerned group of lawyers accused Jahan of giving shelter to Kader Khan who is absconding from the law and demanded that she be arrested. Later she said that if he had committed the crime, he must be punished by the court of law.

Jahan and businessman Nikhil Jain got married on 19 June 2019 in Turkey. Jahan later has claimed that the marriage was not legal and "it was nothing more than a live-in relationship". Later a Kolkata court ruled that Jahan and Jain's marriage is legally invalid.

Jahan began her relationship with actor Yash Dasgupta but their marital status remains unknown as of December 2021. In August 2021, Jahan gave birth to a boy named Yishaan J, Dasgupta, at a private hospital in Kolkata. It is reported that the child's birth certificate named Dasgupta as the father. In February 2022, Jahan confirmed their marriage since 2020.

== Filmography ==
†	Denotes films that have not yet been released

Year	Film	Role	Notes
2011	Shotru	Pooja	Debut film
2013	Khoka 420	Megha	
2013	Khiladi	Pooja	
2014	Action	Herself	Special appearance in the song "Chicken Tandoori"
2014	Yoddha: The Warrior	Herself	Special appearance in item song "Desi Chhori"
2014	Sondhey Namar Age	Rupsa	
2015	Jamai 420	Priyanka	
2015	Har Har Byomkesh	Shakuntala	
2016	Power	Shruti	
2016	Kelor Kirti	Urvashi	
2016	Love Express	Neelasha / Neel	
2016	Zulfiqar	Rani Talapatra ^{[based on Cleopatra]}	
2016	Haripada Bandwala	Sweety	
2017	One	Megha	
2017	Ami Je Ke Tomar	Esha	
2017	Bolo Dugga Maiki	Uma	
2018	Uma	Herself	Cameo appearance
2018	Crisscross	Meher	
2018	Naqaab	Disha	
2020	Asur	Aditi	
2020	SOS Kolkata	Amanda	
2021	Dictionary	Smita	
2022	Swastik Sanket	Rudrani	
2023	Jai Kali Kalkattawali	Raka	ZEE5 Released
2024	Sentimentaaal	Pooja	
2025	Borbaad	Herself	Bangladeshi film; special appearance in item song "Chand Mama"
2025	Aarii	Aditi Ghosh	
2025	Raktabeej 2	Noyona	Special appearance in the song "Order Chhara Border"
2027	O Mon Bhromon †	Shruti	

=== As producer ===
YD Films is an Indian film production company based in Kolkata. The company was established by Yash Dasgupta and Nusrat Jahan in 2023.

List of film producer credits
Year	Title	Notes
2024	Sentimentaaal	
2025	Aarii	
2025	O Mon Bhromon †	

=== Mahalaya ===
Year	Title	Role	Channel
2013	Jago Durga	Devi Durga	ETV Bangla

== Music videos ==
Year	Video	Director(s)	Singer(s)	Composer(s)	Music label
2022	"Naach Moyuri Naach"	Baba Yadav	Luipa	Kaushik Hossain Taposh	TM records
2022	"Hariye Gelam"	Adil Shaikh	Luipa and Papon	Taposh	TM records
2025	"Thomkiya"	Sneha Shetty Kohli	Payal Dev and Papon	Kumaar	Tips official

== Awards ==
- In 2022 Nusrat was awarded Mahanayika by the chief minister of West Bengal Mamata Banerjee.
