= Reyat Hossain Sarkar =

Indian politician

Member of the West Bengal Legislative Assembly
- Incumbent
- Assumed office 4 June 2024
- Preceded by: Idris Ali
- Constituency: Bhagabangola

Reyat Hossain Sarkar is an Indian politician from the Trinamool Congress and a member of the West Bengal Legislative Assembly from the Bhagabangola constituency of Murshidabad district.
