= Haroa Assembly constituency =

Haroa
- Constituency No. 121 for the West Bengal Legislative Assembly
- Interactive Map Outlining Haroa Assembly Constituency

Constituency details
- Country: India
- Region: East India
- State: West Bengal
- District: North 24 Parganas
- Lok Sabha constituency: Basirhat
- Established: 1951
- Total electors: 186,578
- Reservation: None

Member of Legislative Assembly
- 18th West Bengal Legislative Assembly
- Incumbent Abdul Matin Muhammad
- Party: MAITC
- Alliance: MAITC+
- Elected year: 2026

Haroa Assembly constituency is an assembly constituency in North 24 Parganas district in the Indian state of West Bengal.

== Overview ==
As per orders of the Delimitation Commission, 121 Haroa Assembly constituency is composed of the following: Falti Beleghata, Dadpur, Kiritipur I, Kiritipur II, Shashan gram panchayats of Barasat II community development block, Champatala, Deganga I, Deganga II, Hadipur Jhikra II gram panchayats of Deganga community development block, and 3. Gopalpur I, Gopalpur II, Haroa and Khasbalanda gram panchayats of Haroa community development block.

Haroa Assembly constituency is part of 18. Basirhat Lok Sabha constituency.

== Members of the Legislative Assembly ==
Election	Member	Party
Haroa–Sandeshkhali
1951	Jyotish Chandra Roy Sardar	Indian National Congress
1951	Hemanta Kumar Ghoshal	Communist Party of India
1957	Jehangir Kabir	Indian National Congress
1962	Jehangir Kabir	Indian National Congress
Haroa (SC)
1967	Gangadhar Pramanick	Bangla Congress
1969	Brajendra Nath Sarkar	Bangla Congress
1971	Gangadhar Pramanick	Indian National Congress
1972	Gangadhar Pramanick	Indian National Congress
1977	Kshiti Ranjan Mondal	Communist Party of India (Marxist)
1982	Kshiti Ranjan Mondal	Communist Party of India (Marxist)
1987	Kshiti Ranjan Mondal	Communist Party of India (Marxist)
1991	Kshiti Ranjan Mondal	Communist Party of India (Marxist)
1996	Kshiti Ranjan Mondal	Communist Party of India (Marxist)
2001	Kshiti Ranjan Mondal	Communist Party of India (Marxist)
2006	Ashim Kumar Das	Communist Party of India (Marxist)
Haroa
2011	Julfiquer Ali Molla	Trinamool Congress
2016	Haji Nurul Islam	Trinamool Congress
2021	Haji Nurul Islam	Trinamool Congress
2024^	Sheikh Rabiul Islam	Trinamool Congress
2026	Abdul Matin Muhammad	Trinamool Congress

- ^ denotes by-election

== Election results ==
=== 2026 ===
2026 West Bengal Legislative Assembly election: Haroa
Party	Candidate	Votes	%	±%
AITC	Abdul Matin Muhammad	117,591	49.52	▼7.82
Indian Secular Front	Piyarul Islam	68,250	28.74	▲7.01
BJP	Bhaskar Mondal	41,144	17.33	▲10.71
Independent	Piyarul Sanpui	2,964	1.25	
NOTA	None of the above	2,837	1.19	▼0.1
Majority		49,341	20.78	▼14.83
Turnout		237,469	97.53	▲9.8
AITC hold		Swing	-7.82	

=== 2024 bypoll ===
2024 West Bengal Legislative Assembly by-election: Haroa
Party	Candidate	Votes	%	±%
AITC	Sheikh Rabiul Islam	157,072	76.63	▲19.29
Indian Secular Front	Piyarul Islam	41,184	20.53	▲1.2
BJP	Bimal Das	13,570	6.62	▼9.31
INC	Habib Reza Chowdhury	3,765	1.84	
NOTA	None of the above	1,027	0.5	
Majority		115,188	55%	
Turnout		201,118		
AITC hold		Swing		

=== 2021 ===
2021 West Bengal Legislative Assembly election: Haroa
Party	Candidate	Votes	%	±%
AITC	Islam Sk Nurul	130,398	57.34	
Indian Secular Front	Kutubuddin Fathe	49,420	21.73	
BJP	Rajendra Saha	38,506	16.93	
Independent	Mohammad Kutubuddin	2,484	1.09	
United Socialist Party	Akher Ali Molla	2,401	1.06	
NOTA	None of the above	2,930	1.29	
Majority		80,978	35.61	
Turnout		227,395	87.73	
AITC hold		Swing		

=== 2016 ===
West Bengal assembly elections, 2016: Haroa constituency
Party	Candidate	Votes	%	±%
AITC	Haji Nurul Islam	113,001	56.33	+10.63
CPI(M)	Imtiaz Hossain	70,594	35.19	−9.84
BJP	Manmatha Bachar	11,078	5.52	+1.10
BSP	Md. Nazrul Islam	3,208	1.60	
NOTA	None of the above	2,741	1.37	
Turnout		200,622	86.78	+3.09
AITC hold		Swing		

=== 2011 ===
West Bengal assembly elections, 2011: Haroa constituency
Party	Candidate	Votes	%	±%
AITC	Julfiquer Ali Molla	76,627	45.70	+5.84#
CPI(M)	Imtiaz Hossain	75,503	45.03	−10.40
BJP	Subodh Kumar Chakraborty	7,409	4.42	
PDCI	Wallur Rahman	3,910		
Independent	Golam Faruque Mollah	2,401		
BSP	Dilip Bairagi	1,828		
Turnout		167,678	89.87	
AITC gain from CPI(M)		Swing	16.64#	

.# Swing calculated on Congress+Trinamool Congress vote percentages taken together in 2006.

=== 2006 ===
In the 2006 state assembly elections, Asim Kumar Das of CPI(M) won the 97 Haroa (SC) assembly seat defeating his nearest rival Mrityunjoy Mondal of Trinamool Congress. Contests in most years were multi cornered but only winners and runners are being mentioned. Kshiti Ranjan Mondal of CPI(M) defeated Lakshmikanta Mondal of Congress in 2001 and 1996, Kumud Ranjan Roy of Congress in 1991, Lakshmikanta Mondal of Congress in 1987, Gangadhar Pramanick of Congress in 1982 and Brajendra Nath Sarkar of Janata Party in 1977.

=== 1972 ===
Gangadhar Pramanick of Congress won in 1972 and 1971. Brajendra Nath Sarkar of Bangla Congress won in 1969. Gangadhar Pramanick representing Bangla Congress won in 1967. Jehangir Kabir of Congress won in 1962 and 1957. In independent India's first election in 1951, Jyotish Chandra Roy Sardar of Congress and Hemanta Kumar Ghoshal of CPI won the Haroa Sandeshkhali joint seat.
