= Bhagabangola Assembly constituency =

Bhagabangola
- Constituency No. 62 for the West Bengal Legislative Assembly
- Interactive Map Outlining Bhagabangola Assembly Constituency

Constituency details
- Country: India
- Region: East India
- State: West Bengal
- District: Murshidabad
- Lok Sabha constituency: Murshidabad
- Established: 1957
- Total electors: 263,765
- Reservation: None

Member of Legislative Assembly
- 18th West Bengal Legislative Assembly
- Incumbent Reyat Hossain Sarkar
- Party: MAITC
- Alliance: INDIA
- Elected year: 2026

Bhagabangola Assembly constituency is an assembly constituency in Murshidabad district in the Indian state of West Bengal.

== Overview ==
As per orders of the Delimitation Commission, No. 62 Bhagwangola Assembly constituency covers Bhagawangola II community development block and Bhagawangola, Habaspur, Hanumantanagar, Kuthirampur, Mahammadpur, Mahisasthali and Sundarpur gram panchayats of Bhagawangola I CD Block.

Bhagwangola Assembly constituency is part of No. 11 Murshidabad (Lok Sabha constituency).

== Members of the Legislative Assembly ==
Year	Name	Party
1957	Hafizur Rehman Kazi	Indian National Congress
1962	Sailendra Nath Adhicary	Praja Socialist Party
1967	S. Bhattachrya	Indian National Congress
1969	Sailendra Nath Adhicary	Samyukta Socialist Party
1971	Md. Samaun Biswas	Independent politician
1972	Mohammad Deedar Baksh	Indian National Congress
1977	Kazi Hafizur Rahman	Indian National Congress
1982	Kazi Hafizur Rahman	Indian National Congress
1987	Syed Nawabjani Meerza	Independent politician
1991	Syed Nawabjani Meerza	Independent politician
1996	Abu Sufian Sarkar	Indian National Congress
2001	Mojibor Rahaman	West Bengal Socialist Party
2006	Chand Mohammad	West Bengal Socialist Party
2011	Chand Mohammad	Samajwadi Party
2011	Chand Mohammad	Trinamool Congress
2016	Mahasin Ali	Communist Party of India (Marxist)
2021	Idris Ali	Trinamool Congress
2024^	Reyat Hossain Sarkar	Trinamool Congress
2026	Reyat Hossain Sarkar	Trinamool Congress

- ^ by-election

== Election results ==
=== 2026 ===
2026 West Bengal Legislative Assembly election: Bhagabangola
Party	Candidate	Votes	%	±%
AITC	Reyat Hossain Sarkar	105,997	48.57	▼19.48
CPI(M)	Mahamudal Hasan (Mithu)	49,590	22.73	New entry
INC	Anju Begum	29,440	13.49	▼
BJP	Bhaskar Sarkar	23,104	10.59	▲3.2
NOTA	None of the above	1,085	0.5	▼1.0
Majority		56,407	25.85	
Turnout		218,216		
AITC hold		Swing		

=== 2024 by-election ===
West Bengal Legislative Assembly by-election, 2024: Bhagabangola
Party	Candidate	Votes	%	±%
AITC	Reyat Hossain Sarkar	107,096	48.34	▼19.71
INC	Anju Begum	91,479	41.29	New
BJP	Bhaskar Sarkar	17,288	7.8	▲0.41
ISF	Md Murshidul Alam	2,298	1.04	New
NOTA	None of the Above	1,255	0.57	▼0.93
Majority		15,617	7.05	▼39.85
Turnout				
AITC hold		Swing		

=== 2021 ===
In the 2021 election, Idris Ali of Trinamool Congress defeated his nearest rival, Md. Kamal Hossain of CPI (M).

West Bengal assembly elections, 2021: Bhagabangola constituency
Party	Candidate	Votes	%	±%
AITC	Idris Ali	153,795	68.05	▲31.95
CPI(M)	Md. Kamal Hossain	47,787	21.15	▼33.95
BJP	Mehbub Alam	16,707	7.39	▲4.59
NOTA	None of the above	3,396	1.50	
Independent	Md. Mosaraf Hossain	827	0.37	
BSP	Seikh Rabiul Alam	784	0.35	
Independent	Syed Imran Ali Meerza	652	0.29	▼1.51
IUML	Sk. Rejaul Karim	617	0.27	▼0.73
SUCI(C)	Abdul Mabud Nayan	449	0.20	▼0.40
Bahujan Maha Party	Mst. Sikha Khatun	421	0.19	
Independent	Md. Nurul Islam	290	0.13	
United Socialist Party	Ali Hossain	265	0.12	
Majority		106,008	46.90	▲37.80
Turnout		225,990	90.80	▲4
AITC gain from CPI(M)		Swing		

=== 2016 ===
In the 2016 election, Mahasin Ali of CPI (M) defeated his nearest rival, Abu Sufian Sarkar of Trinamool Congress.

West Bengal assembly elections, 2016: Bhagabangola constituency
Party	Candidate	Votes	%	±%
CPI(M)	Mahasin Ali	105,037	54.39	
AITC	Abu Sufian Sarkar	68,732	35.59	
BJP	Mehbub Alam	5,278	2.73	
Independent	Syed Imran Ali Meerza	3,457	1.79	
SP	Hajikul Alam	3,228	1.67	
NOTA	None of the above	2,554	1.32	
IUML	Kamal Pasha	1,855	0.96	
SUCI(C)	Rahul Amin	1,039	0.54	
Independent	Asaduzzaman	763	0.40	
Independent	Abdul Matin	669	0.35	
Independent	Anju Bagum	510	0.26	
Majority		36,305	18.80	
Turnout		193,122	85.98	
CPI(M) gain from SP		Swing		

.# Swing calculated on LF+Congress vote percentages taken together in 2016. Chand Mohammad was the SP candidate in 2011.

=== 2011 ===
In the 2011 election, Chand Mohammad of Samajwadi Party defeated his nearest rival Sagir Hossain of Trinamool Congress.

West Bengal assembly elections, 2011: Bhagabangola constituency
Party	Candidate	Votes	%	±%
SP	Chand Mohammad	62,862	38.63	−7.84#
AITC	Sagir Hossen	49,528	30.43	−19.40#
Independent	Syed Alamgir	40,376	24.81	
BJP	Mahebub Alam	2,638		
MLKSC	Kamal Pasha	2,206		
IJP	Seikh Ajfar Ali	1,752		
Independent	Najrul Islam	1,745		
Independent	Gazi Rahman	1,641		
Turnout		162,748	90.88	
SP hold		Swing	+11.56#	

Syed Alamgir, a rebel Congress candidate contesting as an independent, was suspended from the party, but Adhir Chowdhury, the Baharampur MP continued to extend support to him.

.# Swing calculated on Congress+Trinamool Congress vote percentages taken together in 2006. Chand Mohammad was the WBSP candidate in 2006.

=== 2006 ===
2006 West Bengal Legislative Assembly election: Bhagabangola
Party	Candidate	Votes	%	±%
WBSP	Chand Mohammad	60,889	46.47	+2.62
INC	Abu Sufian Sarkar	51,424	39.24	−3.14
AITC	Sagir Hossain	12,563	9.59	
Independent	Khairul Islam	3,155	2.41	
PBRML	Akbar Ali	3,004	2.29	
Majority		9,465	7.22	+5.75
Turnout		131,035		
WBSP hold		Swing		

=== 2001 ===
2001 West Bengal Legislative Assembly election: Bhagabangola
Party	Candidate	Votes	%	±%
WBSP	Mojibor Rahaman	51,285	43.85	
INC	Abu Sufian Sarkar	49,569	42.38	
Muslim League (State)	Abdus Samad Chowdhury	6,197	5.30	
SP	Syed Nabab Jani Meerza	3,646	3.12	
BJP	Abdul Jalil	2,757	2.36	
Independent	Abul Kalam Azad	2,446	2.09	
JD(U)	Md. Rafeul Haque	1,064	0.91	
Majority		1,716	1.47	
Turnout		116,964	77.81	
WBSP hold		Swing		

=== 1977–2006 ===
In the 2006 state assembly elections, Chand Mohammad of WBSP won the 62 Bhagabangola assembly seat defeating his nearest rival Abu Sufian Sarkar of Congress. Contests in most years were multi cornered but only winners and runners are being mentioned. Mojibor Rahaman of WBSP defeated Abu Sufian Sarkar of Congress in 2001. Abu Sufian Sarkar of Congress defeated Syed Nawabjani Meerza of CPI(M) in 1996. Syed Nawabjani Meerza of CPI(M)/Independent defeated Islam Nazrul of Congress in 1991 and Mojibur Rahaman of Congress in 1987. Kazi Hafizur Rahman of Congress/ Independent defeated Sailen Adhicary, Independent, in 1982 and Sheikh Kazimuddin of CPI(M) in 1977.

=== 1957–1972 ===
Mohammad Dedar Baksh of Congress won in 1972. Md. Samaun Biswas, Independent, won in 1971. Sailendra Nath Adhicary of SSP won in 1969. S. Bhattacharyya of Congress won in 1967. Sailendra Nath Adhicary of PSP won in 1962. Hafizur Rehman Kazi of Congress won in 1957.
