= Aarii =

2025 Indian Bengali film

- Theatrical release poster
- Directed by: Jiit Chakraborty
- Written by: Amitava Bhattacharya
- Produced by: Yash Dasgupta; Amitava Dey; Sreejit Mukherjee
- Starring: Moushumi Chatterjee; Yash Dasgupta; Nusrat Jahan
- Cinematography: Souvik Basu
- Edited by: Subhajit Singha
- Music by: Anindya Chatterjee; Keshab Dey; Lincon Roy Chowdhury
- Production companies: YD Films; GSI Films; GP Entertainment
- Distributed by: PVR Inox Pictures
- Release date: 25 April 2025
- Running time: 137 minutes
- Country: India
- Language: Bengali
- Box office: ₹1.20 crore

Aarii is a 2025 Indian Bengali-language action drama film, written and directed by Jiit Chakraborty. Produced by Yash Dasgupta, Amitava Dey and Sreejit Mukherjee under YD Films, GSI Films and GP Entertainment, the film stars Moushumi Chatterjee as Jaya Sen, Yash Dasgupta as her son Joy Sen and Nusrat Jahan as Aditi, a writer who becomes involved in their lives. The narrative explores the sacrifices and emotional bonds between a widowed mother and her caregiver son. It was released theatrically on 25 April 2025. The film received mixed to positive reviews from the critics and is a blockbuster at the Box Office.

== Plot ==
After the death of her husband, Jaya Sen begins to suffer from a progressive illness that affects her memory and mental health. Her son, Joy Sen, abandons his own aspirations to become her full-time caregiver. The close-knit bond between them attracts the attention of Aditi, a writer researching real-life stories. When Joy finds himself in need of money, a local gang lord, Trilok, pressures him to join his criminal enterprise, and tensions rise as Joy's friend Bubai (Unmesh) and rival Lalon pull him in opposite directions. As the stakes escalate, the family must navigate loyalty, desperation and hope.

== Cast ==
- Moushumi Chatterjee as Jaya Sen
- Yash Dasgupta as Joy Sen
  - Debmalya Gupta as Young Joy Sen
- Nusrat Jahan as Aditi Ghosh
- Partha Bhowmick as Trilok Halder
- Kamaleshwar Mukherjee as Barundeb Acharya
- Debraj Bhattacharya as Lalon Halder
- Unmesh Ganguly as Bubai Acharya
- Sohini Sengupta as Phoolu
- Debolina Biswas as Srimoyee Chatterjee
- Ashim Roy Chowdhury as police
- Abhijit Guha as Lokesh Samanta
- Sumit Panja
- Srabanti Chatterjee (cameo in "Dakat Poreche" song)
- Somraj Maity as Pritam Sunpui (cameo)
- Jiit Chakraborty (cameo)

== Production ==
=== Development ===
The project was announced in late 2024, marking veteran actress Moushumi Chatterjee’s return to Bengali cinema after a 10-year hiatus. The film is the second production under actor Yash Dasgupta’s banner alongside Amitava Dey and Sreejit Mukherjee.

=== Filming ===
Principal photography commenced in December 2024 in South Kolkata. The shoot was completed rapidly, leveraging urban and suburban locales to depict the Sen family’s domestic and community settings.

== Soundtrack ==
Aarii

Soundtrack album by Anindya Chatterjee, Keshab Dey and Lincon Roy Chowdhury
- Released: 2025
- Genre: Feature film soundtrack
- Language: Bengali
- Label: Saregama Bengali
- Producers: Yash Daasguptaa, Nusrat Jahan

Anindya Chatterjee chronology
Konttho (2019)	Aarii (2025)

Keshab Dey chronology
Balaram Kando (2025)	Aarii (2025)

Lincon Roy Chowdhury chronology
Antaratma (2025)	Aarii (2025)

The film's score is composed collaboratively by Anindya Chatterjee, Keshab Dey and Lincon Roy Chowdhury, blending traditional Bengali motifs with contemporary orchestration to underscore the emotional arc of the mother-son relationship.

=== Track listing ===
No.	Title	Lyrics	Singer(s)	Length
1.	"Kichu Kotha"	Lincon Roy Chowdhury	Muhammad Irfan, Anwesshaa	4:18
2.	"Aarii (Title Track)"	Anindya Chatterjee	Anindya Chatterjee	3:31
3.	"Dakat Poreche"	Badal Paul	Iman Chakraborty	2:37
4.	"Mon Pakhi"	Amitabha Bhattacharya	Syed Omy	2:52
5.	"Tor Moto kore keo"	Lincon Roy Chowdhury	Pritam Kumar, Rubai	2:25
Total length:				15:43

== Release ==
Theatrically released across West Bengal and select national screens on 25 April 2025, Aarii opened to moderate box office collections, buoyed by positive word-of-mouth for its performances and emotional depth.

== Controversy ==
In May 2026, Aarii became subject to media scrutiny following allegations of illegal financial investments involving political figures and enforcement agencies. According to media report, the Enforcement Directorate (ED) began investigating whether black money belonging to Trinamool Congress (TMC) politician Jahangir Khan (popularly known as "Pushpa") was funneled into the film's production.

The controversy emerged after Bharatiya Janata Party leaders Abhijit Das and Shankudeb Panda alleged a financial nexus between Khan and the film's director, Jeet Chakraborty. According to Panda, Khan allegedly routed illicit funds through his associate, Shanu Bakshi—the former Block Development Officer (BDO) of Falta—who married Chakraborty in February 2025 around the time the production of Aarii concluded. BJP leaders claimed that Khan used various Tollywood productions and major production houses in South Kolkata to launder money.

In response to the allegations and the leaked messages, Shanu Bakshi denied the claims of political and financial collusion, asserting that the circulating WhatsApp chats were forged using Artificial Intelligence (AI) technology.

== Reception ==
Aarii received generally positive reviews for its heartfelt storytelling and standout performances, particularly Moushumi Chatterjee’s nuanced portrayal of Jaya Sen.

- Poorna Banerjee of The Times of India awarded the film 3 out of 5 stars, praising its exploration of elder care and family bonds while noting its deliberate pacing might challenge some viewers
- IWMBuzz lauded the “high-EQ” screenplay and Moushumi Chatterjee's presence, calling Aarii a “bitter-sweet tale that resonates with universal themes of love and duty.”
