= Haji Nurul Islam =

Indian politician (1963–2024)

Member of Parliament, Lok Sabha
- In office 16 June 2024 – 25 September 2024
- Preceded by: Nusrat Jahan Ruhi
- Constituency: Basirhat
- In office 25 May 2009 – 24 May 2014
- Preceded by: Ajay Chakraborty
- Succeeded by: Idris Ali
- Constituency: Basirhat

Member of the West Bengal Legislative Assembly
- In office 25 May 2016 – 16 June 2024
- Preceded by: Julfiquer Ali Molla
- Succeeded by: Sheikh Rabiul Islam
- Constituency: Haroa

Personal details
- Born: 11 November 1963 Bahera, Duttapukur, North 24 Parganas, West Bengal, India
- Died: 25 September 2024 (aged 60) Bahera, Duttapukur, West Bengal, India
- Party: Trinamool Congress (1998–2024)
- Other political affiliations: Indian National Congress (until 1998)
- Spouse: Rasida Begum
- Children: 4 (including Sheikh Rabiul Islam)
- Education: Matric (ALIM – Khorki Sr. Madrasa)
- Occupation: Politician

Haji Sk. Nurul Islam (Bengali: হাজী সেখ নুরুল ইসলাম; 11 November 1963 – 25 September 2024) was an Indian politician and an MLA from Trinamool Congress in West Bengal. He was a small-time zari businessman and resident of Chhoto Jagulia village in Barasat.

== Background ==
Islam was born in Bahera, West Bengal, India. He joined the Trinamool Congress in January 1998 and served as a member of Bahera Gram Panchayat Samiti since 2003 to 2008. Nurul Islam was elected as the MLA from Haroa Assembly Constituency in 2016 and also became the M.P of Basirhat Lok Sabha constituency first time in 2024 Lok Sabha. He died on 25 September 2024, at the age of 60.

== Deganga riot ==
Islam was accused of being involved in the 2010 Deganga riots. The BJP demanded the arrest of Haji Nurul Islam for instigating the mob into a communal frenzy. An FIR had been filed against him.

Lok Sabha
Preceded by Ajay Chakraborty	Member of Parliament for Basirhat; 2009 – 2014	Succeeded by Idris Ali
Preceded by Nusrat Jahan	Member of Parliament for Basirhat; 2024 – 2024	Succeeded by Vacant
