= Love Express (2016 film) =

2016 film by Rajiv Kumar Biswas

- Release poster
- Directed by: Rajiv Kumar Biswas
- Written by: Merlapaka Gandhi
- Screenplay by: N. K. Salil
- Story by: Merlapaka Gandhi
- Produced by: Shrikant Mohta; Nispal Singh
- Starring: Dev; Nusrat Jahan
- Edited by: Md. Kalam
- Music by: Jeet Gannguli
- Production company: Shree Venkatesh Films
- Distributed by: Shree Venkatesh Films; Surinder Films
- Release date: 9 September 2016
- Running time: 147:21 minutes
- Country: India
- Language: Bengali

Love Express is a 2016 Bengali-language romantic adventure comedy film directed by Rajiv Kumar Biswas. The soundtrack of the film was composed by Jeet Gannguli. The film stars Dev and Nusrat Jahan in lead roles.

This film was actually a remake of 2013 Indian-Telugu Language film Venkatadri Express, starting Sundeep Kishan and Rakul Preet Singh

== Plot ==
The film focusses on a family living in Kolkata whose head is Ram Shibo Prasad, a retired head master. He is a disciplined person and always tries to make his relatives behave in the same way. To avoid bad remarks from the society about his family, he sets up a family constitution of discipline. His mania for discipline is so big that if any one of his family members commits 100 mistakes, that person would be banished from the family and that mistake can be anything which Shibo Prasad hates which includes laughing out loudly. Thus all of the family members maintain a disciplined life to avoid being banished from the house. In detail, the family consists of Shibo Prasad's wife Aparna, an Asthma patient; his daughter Kavita, his son in law Vikas and their kids. Apart from them are Shibo Prasad's two sons Ananada and Raktim Prasad. Since Shibo Prasad's brother Ram Prasad was alleged to be committed 100 Mistakes though he didn't, he is sent away from home. While all of the family members commit mistakes less than 20, Raktim commits 99 mistakes and one more, he is out of the family. So to avoid that Raktim starts leading a careful life. Ananda's marriage is scheduled at New Jalpaiguri and the whole family boards Paharia Express at Howrah. Raktim's mother forgot the Sindor at the house and Raktim goes away to bring it back. Moreover, to his convenience, Raktim is in S4 while others are in S3. So Raktim goes outside the station and waits for an Taxi, But none accepts to go to his area. Meanwhile, a miser techie Neelasha reaches Howrah railway station to board the Paharia Express and the taxi driver goes to bring the change in order to pay her off the balance amount after receiving the fare. Raktim gets into the vehicle and goes to his home. He breaks the house's lock with a stone as he has no keys to open it. He takes the Sindoor and goes back to Howrah Railway Station. Neelasha catches yet another Taxi and reaches to the station. There she pays off the fares of both the vehicles and goes to board the train.

Meanwhile, a passenger named Dulal asks Raktim to take care of his bag till he gets into the train after buying a water bottle and Raktim accepts it. They both save each other's Mobile numbers so that Raktim can give a missed call to Dulal if the train leaves the station and due to that, Dulal would board the train. However a tiffin vendor and a customer quarrel. Raktim in order to avoid committing the 100th mistake keeps quiet. The story shifts to next day morning around 9:30 in the Morning at New Jalpaiguri Railway Station. Shibo Prasad and his entire family travel in two cars which are led by two baaraat bands. Shibo Prasad, Aparna, Kavita and her younger daughter travel in one car and Raktim, Vikas, Ananda, Vikas's son Bhokai and their servant travel in another car. Raktim's shirt has Blood stains and when Anando, Vikas ask the reasons for the stains, Raktim narrates the story which happened in the past 12 hours. To compromise and stop a quarrel, Raktim gets down from the train and starts speaking with the aggrieved persons. Neelasha misguides the customer that Raktim is a Robber and goes along with the customer to complain on Raktim. Meanwhile, Raktim is thanked by the tiffin vendor. But to Raktim's misfortune, Paharia Express leaves the platform. So with the help of the tiffin vendor's friend and good transporter named Keshto, Raktim goes to Burdwan. While Raktim reaches Gura, Keshto goes to the nearby Bar and quarrels with the local police officer Prasanta Sen and one of his constables calling their brandy as cheap liquor. Raktim saves Keshto in time only to realize that the vehicle's keys are in the Bar. Yet again Keshto insults the police. In the meanwhile time Raktim is informed by Dulal that Train left Burdwan and is heading towards Bolpur.

Raktim and Keshto unknowingly get into a car and drive away to Bolpur in order to catch the train. However once again to Raktim's misfortune, They robbed the Police's vehicle and the police are following them. They leave the car and reach the station of Bolpur. A Drunken Keshto gets into Paharia Express making Raktim miss the train again. In the process Raktim gets hurt and faints. On gaining consciousness, Raktim is shocked to see that he is being taken to Burdwan police station by those police. Yet again Raktim escapes and hangs on a Private Bus. The Bus stops and Raktim gets into it for travelling to Rampurhat Junction, yet another important stop of Paharia Express. To his shock Neelasha is his co-passenger. Both unnecessarily quarrel and hence are forcibly dropped out from the Bus. They board a car whose Tyre gets punctured. Raktim goes away with the Tyre telling that he would get it repaired but in turn reaches Rampurhat Junction Railway Station. Yet again luck misfires and he boards the Paharia Express which goes from New jalpaiguri to Howrah. He gets down from the train in time and goes to the next platform to board the Paharia Express which goes to New Jalpaiguri. But he couldn't go as he forgot the Bag of Dulal and more to it Neelasha reaches to Rampur Hat Junction with the bag only to stop Raktim from boarding the Train. Raktim in agony slaps Neelasha and yells at her that he needs to reach New Jalpaiguri in time. Neelasha too responds rashly that Raktim too left her on a highway without any mercy at midnight not even thinking about her safety. Both come to an Understanding later and travel. In the mean way while Raktim is away for a nature call, Neelasha is kidnapped by some men. Luckily Raktim reaches in time and rescues her. Raktim and Neelasha flee away using one of the goon's bikes and reach Kishanganj next morning.

Paharia Express was said to be late for 1 Hours. In the balance time, Raktim narrates his whole story to Neelasha who now understands his situation. At the railway station Raktim and Neelasha save two eloped lovers from the henchmen of the girl's father. They escape from the railway station and with the help of a Thrill seeking Cab owner Pupu, Raktim conducts the lovers' marriage and gives away the Sindoor which he has to give to his brother. Anando is furious after listening this but after that Sundeep shows yet another Sindoor and continues the story. After the happy ending of the lovers' marriage, Raktim and Neelasha are worried about the future consequences and are just 15 km away from New jalpaiguri. But Dulal informs them that Paharia Express is scheduled to arrive in nearly 10 minutes. Now they find that Ram Prasad is a lorry driver who gave them lift to reach the station. Ram prasad is a bachelor who dreamed to get married and he gives away the Sindoor he takes while leaving the house. Raktim reaches on time and boards the train just before it stops in New Jalpaiguri Railway Station. He acts as if though he was sleeping and the rest happened. Now the marriage of Ananda is being conducted and Neelasha, Ram prasad attend the marriage. The bride's father Dhananjay Babu is in worry as the bride eloped with her lover and his men are searching for her. To the shock of Raktim, the bride is none other than the girl whose marriage was conducted by him and Neelasha at Kishangunj. Now Shibo Prasad learns that the girl eloped with her lover and the marriage is halted.

Aparna learns that the girl's marriage was conducted by Raktim and gets a severe Asthma attack. She is joined at the Private Hospital. When Aparna was taken to the Hospital, the bride's father learns about Raktim's act by his henchmen and is furious. In the chase, Ananda learns of this and Keshto who reached New Jalpaiguri in Paharia Express is following the chase. During the chase, Shibo Prasad lets Raktim escape red traffic signals and a traffic constable is hurt by them. After she admitted into the Hospital, Raktim fights with the bride's father's henchmen and Shibo Prasad doesn't stop him from doing so. Later Shibo Prasad discovers the truth and Raktim's mistakes turn 100. Raktim then reminds that Shibo Prasad broke his discipline and ideals during the chase and the fight and he can't leave the family because what he did was just helping the ones in need. The bride's father accept the Lover's marriage. Shibo Prasad increases the Mistakes level from 100 to 1000 letting Raktim and Ram Prasad re enter the house. Aparna is discharged immediately.

== Cast ==
- Dev as Raktim Prasad Ganguly/Laal
- Nusrat Jahan as Nilasha/Neel
- Shankar Chakraborty as Ram Prasad Ganguly, Shibo Prasad's brother
- Victor Banerjee as Shibo Prasad Ganguly
- Saheb Chatterjee as Anando Prasad Ganguly, Laal's big brother
- Kharaj Mukherjee as Pupu
- Rudranil Ghosh as Drunk Driver Kesto
- Kanchan Mullick as Dulal
- Supriyo Dutta as Dhananjay Babu, Bride's father
- Kaushik Banerjee as Prasanta Sen, Police Officer
- Tulika Basu as Aparna, Raktim's mother
- Rohit Mukherjee as Bikash Da
- Saptarshi Basu as Vokai
- Namita Chakraborty as Kavita
- Madhumita Chakraborty as Bride's mother
- Ashim Roy Chowdhury as Train Ticket Checker
- N. K. Salil as Bus passenger

== Soundtrack ==
Love Express

Soundtrack album by Jeet Gannguli
- Released: 2016
- Recorded: 2015–2016
- Genre: Feature film soundtrack
- Language: Bengali
- Label: Surinder Films
- Producers: Nispal Singh; Shrikant Mohta

Jeet Gannguli chronology
Power (2016)	Love Express (2016)	Chaamp (2017)

All lyrics are written by Prasen (Prasenjit Mukherjee), Priyo Chattopadhyay; all music is composed by Jeet Gannguli.

No.	Title	Lyrics	Singer(s)	Length
1.	"Mon Boleche Amar"	Prasen (Prasenjit Mukherjee)	Jeet Gannguli, Bob Omulo	04:16
2.	"Majhe Majhe"	Prasen (Prasenjit Mukherjee)	Kumar Sanu, Shreya Ghoshal	04:46
3.	"Dhitang Dhitang"	Priyo Chattopadhyay	Armaan Malik	03:34

== Reception ==
A critic from The Times of India rated the film three-and-a-half out of five stars and wrote that "Overall, Love Express is a film you can surely watch with your family or friends. It’s a clean, well-made entertainer through and through".
