= Clinton Cerejo =

Indian singer and composer

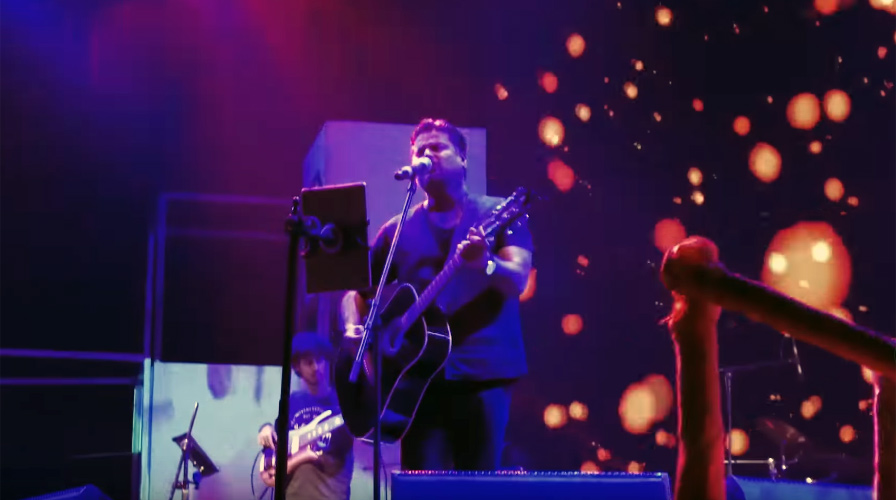
- Cerejo performing with his band, live at the Festival of Arunachal Pradesh, 2018

Background information
- Born: Mumbai, Maharashtra, India
- Occupations: Singer; composer
- Years active: 1999–present
- Spouse: Dominique Cerejo
- Website: clintoncerejo.com

Clinton Cerejo is an Indian singer and composer.

== Personal life ==
Clinton Cerejo was born into an academically inclined family with no known musical background. His father was an engineer at L&T and his mother is a French professor. His elder brother is a software professional and his younger sister is an editor for medical journals in the United States. He completed his graduation in Commerce from Poddar College in Mumbai and was on his way to pursue a degree in M.B.A before his friends convinced him of his musical talent.

During his younger days, he was influenced by great producers such as Quincy Jones, Trevor Horn, Arif Mardin, Stevie Wonder, Babyface, Hugh Padgham, Peter Gabriel, Roland Orzabal, and Roy Thomas Baker. Clinton married Dominique Cerejo, who was his college friend and is now an established singer.

He is married to fellow singer Dominique Cerejo and has two children, Evania Cerejo and Noah Cerejo.

== Career ==
During his time at college, he would often have jam sessions with his friend Siddharth Haldipur (of music director duo Sangeet-Siddharth fame). It was on one such session that Amar Haldipur (Siddharth's father), who is a famous arranger and violinist, noticed Clinton and took a liking to his voice. Amar introduced Clinton to Anand Modak, the music director of a Marathi film Mukta and soon he was performing his first song in a recording studio. It was an English song for a Marathi film, picturised on an African-American.

After a series of sporadic recordings, he started lending his voice to many advertisement jingles, including the popular "Kiss Me, Close Your Eyes" jingle for Cadbury. During this period he worked with Shankar–Ehsaan–Loy, Lezz Lewis, Ranjit Barot & Louis Banks. Some of his contemporaries at that time were KK and Kunal Ganjawala, who went on to become playback singers. Clinton and Kunal sang a lot of jingles together.

Realizing that his voice was not versatile enough to be a successful jingle singer, he started looking at other areas of interest.

A. R. Rahman, while working in an adjoining studio, happened to overhear one of Clinton's vocal arrangements for a song and when they met a month later, offered Clinton the opportunity to work with him. Soon his work was noticed by many and other projects followed.

Eventually Clinton went on to work with many leading Indian music composers performing various roles in the music department. Later on he composed various songs which were featured in Coke studio. One of the famous songs is "Madari", sung by Vishal Dadlani and Sonu Kakkar.

== Discography ==
=== As composer ===
==== Films ====
Year	Album	Notes
2011	Pyaar Ka Punchnama	2 songs
2012	Kahaani	Background Score
2012	Ek Main Aur Ekk Tu	Background Score
2015	Tevar	Background Score
2016	Kahaani 2: Durga Rani Singh	Original songs, Background Score
2016	Te3n	Original songs, Background Score
2016	Jugni	Original songs, Background Score
2019	Badla	1 song, Background Score
2019	Section 375	Background Score
2020	Yaara	Released on ZEE5; Background Score
2021	Chehre	Background score
2021	Bob Biswas	Released on Zee5; 2 songs along with Bionca Gomes, Background score
2022	Love Hostel	Released on Zee5; 2 songs along with Bionca Gomes, 2 instrumentals, Background Score
2022	Dobaaraa	1 song along with Bionca Gomes, Background Score
2023	I Love You	Released on JioCinema; 3 songs along with Bionca Gomes, Background Score
2023	Blind	Released on JioCinema; All songs along with Bionca Gomes
2023	Jaane Jaan	Released on Netflix; Background Score along with Bionca Gomes
2024	Bhakshak	Released on Netflix; Background Score along with Bionca Gomes
2025	Dhoom Dhaam	Released on Netflix; All songs along with Bianca Gomes

==== Non-film work ====
Year	Album	Notes
2005	Jawani Diwani (Hindi)	Clinton composed the title track for this album which was sung by Bobby Moon
2012	"Madari-Coke studio"	Composed the song
2013	Reunion Song	Composer for Google India Google Search Advertisement
2016	Jammin	Inquilab Mera Khwab by Sanam and Clinton Cerejo; Ishq Abhi Bhi By Clinton Cerejo And Sanah Moidutty; Tonight We Dance by Clinton Cerejo & RaagaTrippin
2018	Jammin Season 2	Kya Karoon? And Mehram by Clinton Cerejo and Prakriti Kakar; Naina Thug lenge By Clinton Cerejo And Salman Ali; Ek Ladki Ko Dekha To Aisa Laga and Safar by Clinton Cerejo & Gajendra Verma

=== As music producer (For other composers) ===
Year	Album	Album Artist
2006	Omkara	Vishal Bhardwaj
2007	Come One Come All	The Fine (band)
2009	Kaminey	Vishal Bhardwaj
2010	Ishqiya	Vishal Bhardwaj
2011	7 Khoon Maaf	Vishal Bhardwaj
2012	Mauje Naina	MTV Coke Studio season 2

=== Singer ===
Year	Album	Songs	Language	Composer	Lyricist
1999	Taj Mahal	"Thirupachi"	Tamil	A. R. Rahman	
2000	Kandukondain Kandukondain	"Smayiyai"	Tamil	A. R. Rahman	
2000	Alai Payuthey	"Endendrum Punnagai"	Tamil	A. R. Rahman	
2000	Alai Payuthey	"Pachchai Nirame"	Tamil	A. R. Rahman	
2000	Alai Payuthey	"Maangalyam"	Tamil	A. R. Rahman	
2000	Thenali	"Thenali"	Tamil	A. R. Rahman	
2001	12B	"Anandam"	Tamil	Harris Jayaraj	
2001	One 2 Ka 4	"One 2 Ka 4"	Hindi	A. R. Rahman	
2002	Vasu	"Sportive Boys"	Telugu	Harris Jayaraj	
2002	King	"Saturday Sunday Holiday"	Tamil	Dhina	
2003	Darna Mana Hai	"Homework"	Hindi	Salim–Sulaiman	
2003	Boys	"Secret of Success"	Tamil	A. R. Rahman	
2003	Boys	"Please Sir"	Tamil	A. R. Rahman	
2003	Bhoot	"Ghor Andhere"	Hindi	Salim–Sulaiman	
2003	Naaga	"Nayudori Pilla"	Telugu	Vidyasagar & Deva	
2004	Manmadhan	"Thathai Thathai"	Tamil	Yuvan Shankar Raja	
2005	Kanda Naal Mudhal	"Pushing It Hard"	Tamil	Yuvan Shankar Raja	Thamarai
2005	Neal 'n' Nikki	"I'm in Love"	Hindi	Salim–Sulaiman	
2005	Neal 'n' Nikki	"I Just Wanna Spend My Life With You"	Hindi	Salim–Sulaiman	
2005	Ek Ajnabee	"Tere Liye Meri"	Hindi	Vishal-Shekhar	Sameer
2006	Omkara	"Beedi"	Hindi	Vishal Bhardwaj	Gulzar
2006	Kalvanin Kadhali	"Ivan Kattil"	Tamil	Yuvan Shankar Raja	
2006	Happy	"Chal Chal Re"	Telugu	Yuvan Shankar Raja	
2007	Sunday	"Sunday Theme"	Hindi	Amar Mohile	
2007	Partner	"Do U Wanna Partner"	Hindi	Sajid–Wajid	Sanjay Chhel
2008	Vaaranam Aayiram	"Oh Shanthi"	Tamil	Harris Jayaraj	
2008	Yuvvraaj	"Dil Ka Rishta"	Hindi	A. R. Rahman	
2009	All the Best: Fun Begins	"Kyun"	Hindi	Pritam	
2009	Wake Up Sid!	"Kya Karoon"	Hindi	Shankar–Ehsaan–Loy	Javed Akhtar
2009	Siva Manasula Sakthi	"Eppadio Matikittaen"	Tamil	Yuvan Shankar Raja	
2009	Ride	"Rangula lokam"	Telugu	Hemachandra	
2009	Luck	"Aazma – Luck Is The Key"	Hindi	Salim–Sulaiman	
2009	Konchem Ishtam Konchem Kashtam	"Egire Egire"	Telugu	Shankar–Ehsaan–Loy	
2010	Kanimozhi	"Penne Pogathey"	Tamil	Satish Chakravarthy	
2010	Kanimozhi	"Thada Thada Endru"	Tamil	Satish Chakravarthy	
2010	Prithvi	"Hejjegondu Hejje"	Kannada	Manikanth Kadri	
2010	Karthik Calling Karthik	"Hey Ya!"	Hindi	Shankar–Ehsaan–Loy	Javed Akhtar
2010	Karthik Calling Karthik	"Hey Ya! (Remix)"	Hindi	Shankar–Ehsaan–Loy	
2010	Ishqiya	"Dil To Bachcha Hai (Remix)"	Hindi	Vishal Bhardwaj	Gulzar
2011	Oosaravelli	"Love Ante Caring"	Telugu	Devi Sri Prasad	
2011	Pyar Ka Punchnama	"Baanware"	Hindi	Clinton Cerejo, Hitesh Sonik	Luv Ranjan
2011	7 Khoon Maaf	"O' Mama" (Rap Vocals)	Hindi	Vishal Bhardwaj	Gulzar
2011	7 Khoon Maaf	"Doosri Darling"	Hindi	Vishal Bhardwaj	Gulzar
2011	Veppam	"Oru Devadai"	Tamil	Joshua Sridhar	
2012	Blood Money	"Arzoo"	Hindi	Sangeet Haldipur, Siddharth Haldipur	Kumaar
2012	Vicky Donor	"Kho jaane do"	Hindi	Abhishek Akshay	Juhi Chaturvedi
2012	Ekk Deewana Tha	"Phoolon Jaisi"	Hindi	A R Rahman	Javed Akhtar, (Malayalam lyrics:Kalyani Menon)
2013	Run Raja Run	"Shanthi Om Shanthi"	Telugu	M. Ghibran	
2013	One By Two	"Baat Kya Hai"	Hindi	Shankar–Ehsaan–Loy	Amitabh Bhattacharya
2013	Raja Rani	"Chillena"	Tamil	G.V Prakash	
2013	Ek Thi Daayan	"Kaali Kaali"	Hindi	Vishal Bhardwaj	Gulzar
2013	Ek Thi Daayan	"Yaaram"	Hindi	Vishal Bhardwaj	Gulzar
2015	Jil	"Emaindi Vela"	Telugu	M. Ghibran	
2016	Te3n	"Haq Hai"	Hindi	Clinton Cerejo	Amitabh Bhattacharya
2016	Te3n	"Kyun Re"	Hindi	Clinton Cerejo	Amitabh Bhattacharya
2016	Kahaani 2: Durga Rani Singh	"Anandoloke"	Hindi	Clinton Cerejo	"Rabindra Sangeet"
2017	Kaadhali	"Kaadhal Kaadhal"	Telugu	Prasan Praveen Shyam	
2017	Meri Pyaari Bindu	"Iss Tarah"	Hindi	Sachin–Jigar	Kausar Munir
2024	Article 370	"Aandhi"	Hindi	Shashwat Sachdev	Kumaar

== Awards and nominations ==
Year	Category	Nominated work	Result	Ref.
Mirchi Music Awards
2010	Best Programmer & Arranger of the Year	"Dil To Bachcha Hai" from Ishqiya	Nominated	
2012	Background Score of the Year	Kahaani	Won	
2017	Best Song Producer (Programming & Arranging)	"Julia" from Rangoon	Won	
Filmfare Awards
2020	Best Background Score	Badla	Nominated	
