= Michael (2011 Indian film) =

2011 Indian Hindi film

- Directed by: Ribhu Dasgupta
- Written by: Ribhu Dasgupta; Debaloy Bhattacharya
- Produced by: Anurag Kashyap; Guneet Monga; Ramesh Sharma; Shaiju Nambiadath; Suni Bohra
- Starring: Naseeruddin Shah; Mahie Gill; Sabyasachi Chakrabarty
- Cinematography: Somak Mukherjee
- Edited by: Lionel Fernandes
- Release date: 15 September 2011 (TIFF)
- Country: India
- Language: Hindi

Michael is a 2011 Indian psychological thriller film directed by Ribhu Dasgupta and produced by Anurag Kashyap.

== Plot ==
The film opens some years ago with Kolkata police inspector Michael at a political rally. It is a large rally, several hundred people packed into a square, the largest protest against the current government, yet it is wholly peaceful. Michael receives a radio order to open fire and disperse the crowd. He protests, it is a peaceful rally, but his supervisor, acting on political pressure from above, repeats the order to fire. Michael fires a single shot that accidentally hits a 12-year-old boy.

Michael is diagnosed with "progressive myopia" and subsequently fired from his position without severance or pension benefits. He begins receiving angry phone calls from the father of the dead boy. The father threatens to kill Michael's 8-year-old son Roy on his 12th birthday.

Several years later, Michael is living in a small apartment with his son. He makes a miserable living as a projectionist in a movie theater and ekes out some additional income pirating movies for a gang of local thugs. Michael is always harangued by his landlord, the drunk and bitter Mr. DCosta, for overdue rent and continues to receive progressively threatening calls from the dead boy's father. His only goal is to get Roy out of the city and into a boarding school, saving money that he moves about his apartment so DCosta cannot find it. Rwitika, Michael's only friend, occasionally looks after Roy and urges him to pick up and move on. Amid this turmoil, he finds a quiet comfort in Mrs DCosta, who generally sympathizes with him and occasionally warns him about her husband.

A few days before Roy's 12th birthday, Michael gets intensely threatening phone calls. He stumbles out of his movie theater (and forgets an important movie copying job for which he has received an advance). His midget assistant Makkhan copies the movie and tries to sell it to a rival gang. Michael returns later and picks up a DVD (empty, since Makkhan took the movie DVD) and delivers it. When Michael returns home, he finds the gang members outside who beat him up until he figures out what happened. His assistant Makkhan shows up, badly beaten up, and discloses that the rival gang members took the DVD and beat him up and gave him no money. If Michael had paid him more money, he would not have gone to the other gang. They argue about the money until Michael discovers that his saved money is gone! Michael, slowly unspooling into insanity, moves Roy to Rwitika's place and subsequently beseeches her to send him away. He barges into DCosta's flat across the hall to see them celebrating something. In a maddened (and drunk) stupor, Michael threatens DCosta with a pistol and later begs him to return the money. DCosta, himself drunk, curses and berates Michael whereupon Michael, crazed with anger, shoots him dead. His wife reveals that it was she who took the money for her fertility treatment. Michael is shocked and hurt that she betrayed his trust. He runs out of the flat and, knowing that the police will hunt him down for murder, goes to get Roy out of the city.

Michael hurries to Rwitika's place to get Roy. At midnight, Roy's birthday, he runs across a crossroad. A public phone rings and Michael stops to pick it up. It is the dead boy's father, who vows to shoot Roy. Michael begs him to stop until Rwitika comes on the line next. Shocked, Michael hangs up the phone and steps into the road where a passing taxicab runs him over and kills him. It is revealed that Michael had been hearing voices all along (there was no father of the dead boy) since his guilt over the rally slowly drove him insane. The film ends as a police jeep finds his body and calls for an ambulance.

== Cast ==
- Naseeruddin Shah as Michael
- Mahie Gill as Rwitika
- Sabyasachi Chakrabarty
- Rudranil Ghosh
- Iravati Harshe
- Churni Ganguly
