= Kiss Me, Close Your Eyes =

Advertising jingle for Cadbury Dairy Milk Silk

Song by Armaan Malik, Shirley Setia
- Language: English; Hindi (some adaptations)
- Released: 2010 (first use in Cadbury Dairy Milk Silk advertisements)
- Genre: Jingle, Pop
- Label: Ogilvy India, Mondelez India Foods Pvt. Ltd.
- Songwriters: Armaan Malik, Shirley Setia (vocals, partial lyrics); Clinton Cerejo (composition, production)
- Composer: Clinton Cerejo
- Producer: Clinton Cerejo

"Kiss Me, Close Your Eyes" is a promotional song and jingle created for the Cadbury Dairy Milk Silk series of television advertisements in India. The song is performed by Indian singers Armaan Malik and Shirley Setia, with music composed and produced by Clinton Cerejo.

== Background ==
The song was introduced as part of Cadbury's marketing campaign for Dairy Milk Silk, a premium chocolate variant. Cadbury Dairy Milk has long been associated with feel-good advertising in India, but the launch of Dairy Milk Silk marked a shift toward more romantic and aspirational messaging. According to industry experts, Silk’s campaigns evolved from focusing solely on product enjoyment to emphasizing memorable shared experiences, with the chocolate acting as a proxy for emotional connection and desire. Strategic planning and creative development were driven by Ogilvy India, with Ganapathy Balagopalan and other agency leaders highlighting the intent to elevate Silk from being a premium product to a cultural icon in romantic gestures.

The song is widely recognized for its romantic and dreamy tone, used to evoke themes of love, indulgence, and emotional connection, aligning with the brand's image of smooth, creamy chocolate. The popularity of the song has led to several variations by the public, including a version of the song with dhol and drums.

== Production and Campaign ==
The creative development for the advertising involved a multi-disciplinary team. Client-side leadership at Mondelez India Foods Pvt. Ltd. collaborated with Ogilvy India's creative, planning, media, and account teams to produce various iterations of the campaign. Notable contributors included Ganapathy Balagopalan (planning), Zenobia Pithawalla and Mihir Chanchani (creative direction), and production led by Nirvana Films under director Prakash Varma. Campaigns often launched during key romantic holidays, such as Valentine’s Day, to maximize cultural resonance.

== Lyrics and theme ==
The lyrics of "Kiss Me, Close Your Eyes" are simple and evocative, emphasizing the sensual and joyful experience of sharing a kiss and enjoying the moment of togetherness. The chorus includes the following lines:

"Kiss Me, Close Your Eyes

Miss Me, Close Your Eyes

I Can Read Your Lips

On Your Fingertips

I Can Feel Your Smile

Come On My Lips

And Happiness In Our Eyes"

== Reception and impact ==
"Kiss Me, Close Your Eyes" has become iconic in Indian advertising. The catchy melody and relatable lyrics have made it a favorite, and the song is often referenced in discussions about memorable Indian TV commercials.

== See also ==
- Cadbury Dairy Milk
- Armaan Malik
- Shirley Setia
- Clinton Cerejo
