= Our Lady Queen of the Missions School =

Location
- 260A HB Block, Sector III; Salt Lake City, West Bengal, 700106; India; 22.573574°N 88.41689°E

Information
- Type: Higher secondary school
- Motto: Virtue and Knowledge
- Religious affiliation: Congregation of Our Lady of the Missions (Roman Catholic)
- School board: CISCE
- Principal: Sr.Mercy Puthuva
- Grades: Nursery–12
- Gender: Girls
- Language: English
- Houses: Blue, green, yellow, red
- Colours: Blue and white
- Website: www.qmspc.org

Our Lady Queen of the Missions School is a higher secondary school in Kolkata, West Bengal, India. The school was established on 1 August 1946 by the Congregation of Our Lady of the Missions at 34 Syed Amir Ali Avenue, Kolkata as a secondary school. Higher secondary was added at the Salt Lake campus. The foundation stone of the school at Salt Lake was laid on 9 February 1997 and started functioning in April 2001. It is affiliated to the Council for the Indian School Certificate Examinations board.

== Notable alumni ==
- Nusrat Jahan, Actress
