= Idris Ali (politician) =

Indian politician (1950–2024)

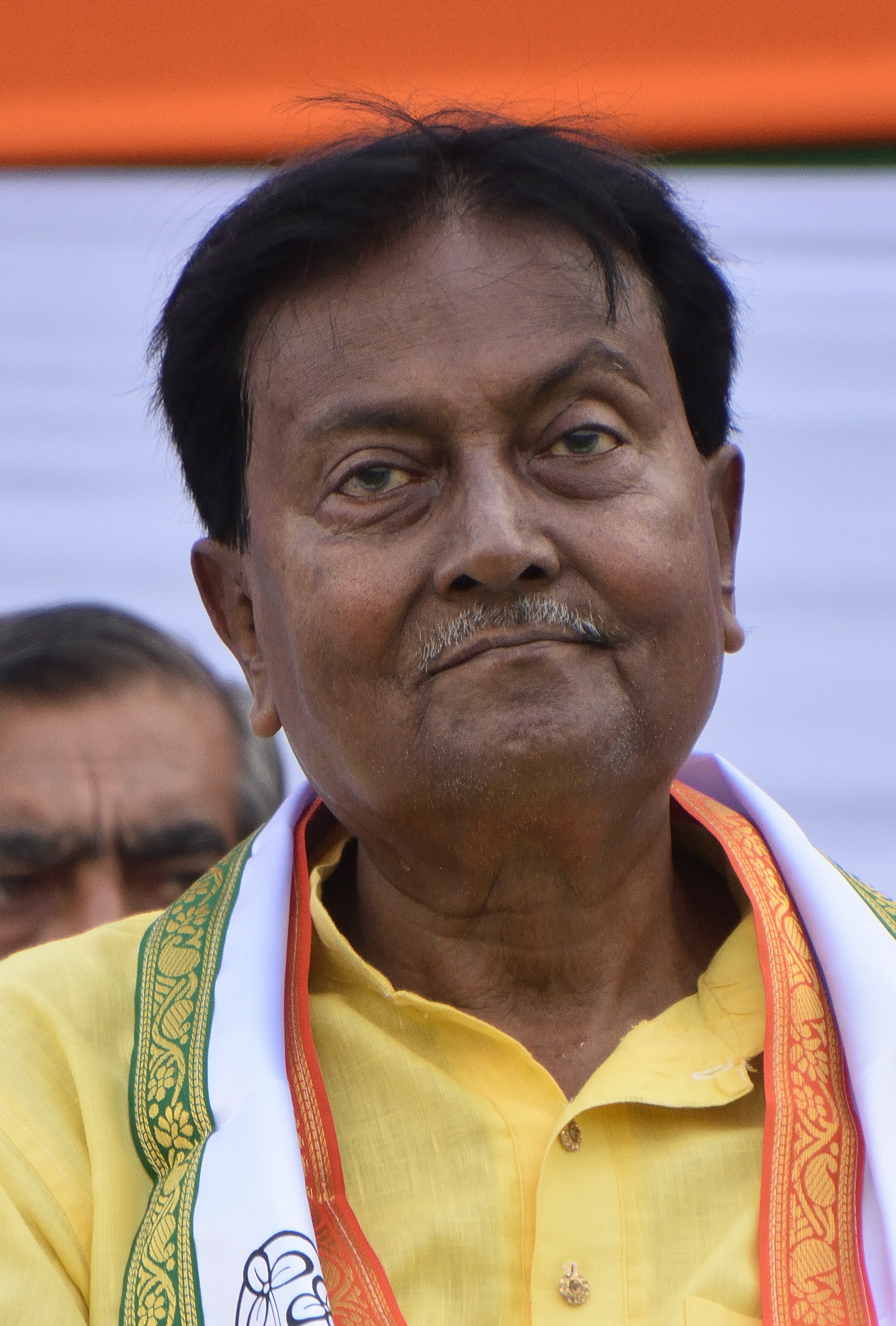
- Ali in 2023

Member of the West Bengal Legislative Assembly
- In office 6 May 2021 – 16 February 2024
- Preceded by: Mahasin Ali
- Succeeded by: Reyat Hossain Sarkar
- Constituency: Bhagabangola
- In office 2019–2021
- Preceded by: Haider Aziz Safwi
- Succeeded by: Bidesh Ranjan Bose
- Constituency: Uluberia Purba

Member of Parliament, Lok Sabha
- In office 16 May 2014 – 23 May 2019
- Preceded by: Haji Sk. Nurul Islam
- Succeeded by: Nusrat Jahan
- Constituency: Basirhat

Personal details
- Born: 30 December 1950 Kolkata, West Bengal, India
- Died: 16 February 2024 (aged 73) Howrah, India
- Party: Trinamool Congress
- Other political affiliations: Indian National Congress
- Children: 3
- Education: BSc , LL.B
- Alma mater: St. Paul's Cathedral Mission College (BSc), Surendranath Law College (LL.B)
- Profession: politician

Idris Ali (30 December 1950 – 16 February 2024) was an Indian politician who was a Member of Parliament for the 16th Lok Sabha from Basirhat, West Bengal. He was elected in the 2014 Indian general election as an Trinamool Congress candidate.

== Early life and education ==
Idris Ali was born on 30 December 1950. He was educated at St. Paul's Cathedral Mission College and Surendranath Law College.

== Political career ==
Ali started his political career with Indian National Congress. In the 2014 Indian general election, he was elected as a member of parliament from the Basirhat seat on an All India Trinamool Congress ticket. He won by a margin of 109,000 votes.

In January 2017, Ali lodged a police complaint for allegedly receiving a death threat in a phone call. He claimed that the caller was a Bengali from Dubai and had said that Ali would be killed for supporting the Trinamool Congress.

On 13 March 2019, Mamata Banerjee announced that Ali would not contest the upcoming general election.

== Views ==
Ali likened party president and chief minister Mamata Banerjee to Mahatma Gandhi. He said that like Gandhi, Banerjee was "a symbol of communal harmony and peace". He also equated Banerjee with the Hindu goddess Saraswati and the Christian missionary Mother Teresa for doing "developmental work".

Ali also said that the state of West Bengal and the country would burn if Banerjee was arrested in connection to the Saradha Group financial scandal. However, his party's secretary general Partha Chatterjee said that the party did not support Ali's views.

After the Pathankot attack, Ali said that Prime Minister Narendra Modi had "links" with the terrorists. However, the spokesperson of the party Derek O'Brien said that Ali's comments were "not the view of the party".

== Controversy ==
Ali was accused of inciting riots in the Park Circus area in 2007 while protesting against Bangladeshi author Taslima Nasreen. Though he was arrested and a charge sheet was filed against him, he was released on bail.

== Death ==
Ali was admitted to a private hospital in Howrah on 13 February 2024 as he was unable to breathe properly. He died on 16 February 2024 due to several illnesses, at the age of 73. He was survived by his wife, two daughters and a son.
