= Te3n =

2016 Indian film by Ribhu Dasgupta

- Theatrical release poster
- Directed by: Ribhu Dasgupta
- Screenplay by: Suresh Nair; Ritesh Shah; Bijesh Jayarajan
- Based on: Montage by Jeong Keun-seob
- Produced by: Sujoy Ghosh; Anirudh Tanwar; Gulab Singh Tanwar; Abhijit Ghatak; Suresh Nair; Sameer Rajendran; Gauri Sathe
- Starring: Amitabh Bachchan; Nawazuddin Siddiqui; Vidya Balan; Sabyasachi Chakraborty; Padmavati Rao
- Cinematography: Tushar Kanti Ray
- Edited by: Gairik Sarkar
- Music by: Clinton Cerejo
- Production companies: Endemol Shine India; Reliance Entertainment; Blue Waters Motion Pictures; Cinemaa; Kross Pictures
- Distributed by: Reliance Entertainment
- Release date: 10 June 2016
- Running time: 136 minutes
- Country: India
- Language: Hindi
- Budget: ₹340 million
- Box office: est. ₹323.1 million

Teen (stylised as Te3n; transl. 'Three') is a 2016 Indian Hindi-language thriller film written and directed by Ribhu Dasgupta. This remake of the 2013 South Korean film Montage stars Amitabh Bachchan, Nawazuddin Siddiqui, Sabyasachi Chakraborty, Padmavati Rao, and Vidya Balan in the lead roles. It was released on 10 June 2016. The film was a commercial failure at the box office.

== Plot ==
John Biswas is a 70-year-old grandfather who visits the police station regularly. He is desperate to find the kidnapper and murderer of his granddaughter Angela, who died eight years ago. Police inspector Sarita Sarkar has no clues about the case. Yet, she continues to search for the perpetrator, despite being discouraged by people all around her and slowly collects evidence.

John's wife Nancy is sick and uses a wheelchair. Despite personal problems, John is determined not to give up. John also regularly meets Father Martin Das, who was a police inspector and was handling the Angela kidnapping case. Father Martin Das tries his best in solving the case, but the guilt of being unsuccessful compelled him to leave his job and become a priest.

One day, eight years after that tragic incident, another boy named Rony is kidnapped. Everything about the kidnapping parallels the kidnapping of Angela. Further investigation reveals that the modus operandi for kidnapping Rony is the same as that of Angela. Inspector Sarita requests Father Martin for assistance in cracking the case. Martin supports partially by providing clues and Sarita, with John, starts investigating the case.

Since the modus operandi was the same, Angela's case file is re-opened. Rony's grandfather, Manohar is arrested when he tries to flee with the ransom at the railway station. Sarita interrogates him in the lock-up, but he says he was acting under the instructions of the real kidnapper.

In the meantime, John doggedly pieces together the identity of Angela's kidnapper from little bits of information that he collects through his own investigations. It is eventually revealed that these scenes take place before Rony's kidnapping, as John discovers that Manohar was the one who had kidnapped Angela and subsequently creates a plan to kidnap Rony to seek revenge and justice.

Father Martin finds out that John kidnapped Rony and confronts him. John requests Martin to arrange a meeting with Manohar. During the meeting, John makes Manohar confess to his crimes. Manohar explains that he kidnapped Angela to pay for his daughter's open heart surgery.

It is revealed that Angela was not murdered — while being held captive, she escaped and accidentally fell from a height on to a moving car and died. The car was driven by Father Martin Das, who was injured in the accident. Manohar is arrested for his crimes. John cries tears of happiness, having avenged Angela's murder as the screen fades out.

== Cast ==
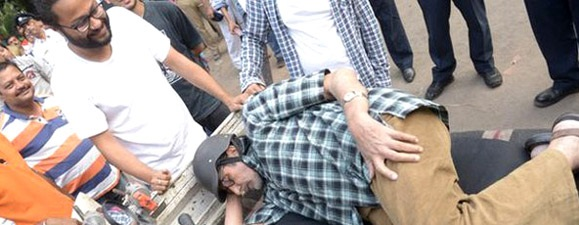
Ribhu Dasgupta (standing) with Amitabh Bachchan, during the shooting of Te3n

- Amitabh Bachchan as John Biswas
- Nawazuddin Siddiqui as Father Martin Das
- Vidya Balan as Sarita Sharma
- Sabyasachi Chakrabarty as Manohar Sinha
- Padmavati Rao as Nancy Biswas, wife of John Biswas
- Aarnaa Sharma as Angela Roy
- Tota Roy Chowdhury as Peter Roy, Angela's father
- Ricky Patel as Rony Poddar
- Anupam Bhattacharya as Hemant Poddar, Rony's father
- Deblina Chakravorty as Neeta, Rony's mother
- Mukesh Chhabra as Tariq, real estate agent
- Prakash Belawadi as Kumar
- Masood Akhtar as Imambara official
- Phalguni Chatterjee as LMO officer
- Arun Saha as LMO clerk
- Arindol Bagchi as orphanage clerk
- Antara Banerjee as bride in church
- Abhipriti Das as deaf and mute girl
- Mohammad Arif as groom in church
- Paritosh Sand as ACP
- Biswajeet Das as church patron
- Indira Dutta Choudhury as maid
- Sujata Ghosh as constable
- Pratap Rana as peon
- Rajat Das as hawker
- Sagnik as Bhaskor
- Satyam Majumdar as LMO manager
- Suneel Sinha as Hari Prakash
- Soumyajit Majumdar as Hari Prakash's manager

== Production ==
Shooting started on 24 November 2015 with Vidya Balan and Nawazuddin Siddiqui at Writers' Building, Kolkata. It is the first Hindi film for which the doors of the Victorian-era Writers' Building were opened for shooting. Many parts of the movie were also shot in the historic heritage site of St. Paul's Cathedral, Kolkata. Actor Amitabh Bachchan was reported to join the crew on 27 November 2015. The movie was shot in Kolkata. Shooting wrapped up on 31 January 2016.

The trailer was released on 5 May 2016.

In May 2016, Bachchan revealed that the rights of the 2013 South Korean movie had been officially purchased by Sujoy Ghosh.

== Music ==
Te3n

Soundtrack album by Clinton Cerejo
- Released: 27 May 2016
- Recorded: 2016
- Genre: Film soundtrack
- Length: 20:43
- Language: Hindi
- Label: T-Series
- Producer: Clinton Cerejo

Clinton Cerejo chronology
Jugni (2016)	Te3n (2016)

Clinton Cerejo composed the music and background score of the film while Amitabh Bhattacharya wrote the lyrics. The audio album of the movie was released on 27 May which was accompanied by a live performance by Vishal Dadlani on the song "Grahan". The album consists of five tracks sung by Clinton Cerejo, Vishal Dadlani, Benny Dayal, Divya Kumar and Bianca Gomes.

Amitabh Bachchan recorded a version of song "Kyun Re" for the film. The song depicts the pain of a grandpa who has lost his granddaughter. The music rights were acquired by T-Series.

=== Track listing ===
All lyrics are written by Amitabh Bhattacharya; all music is composed by Clinton Cerejo, Mukesh Officials.

No.	Title	Singer(s)	Length
1.	"Haq Hai"	Clinton Cerejo	5:20
2.	"Rootha"	Benny Dayal, Divya Kumar, Bianca Gomes	5:19
3.	"Kyun Re"	Clinton Cerejo	3:23
4.	"Grahan"	Vishal Dadlani	4:41
5.	"Kyun Re - 1"	Amitabh Bachchan	3:22
Total length:			20:43

== Release ==
The film released in about 373 screens in various countries with about 93 screens in USA, 80 in UAE, 51 in Pakistan, 30 in UK, 20 in Kenya, 17 in Australia, 15 in Tanzania, 12 in Canada, over 9 screens in Malaysia and other countries.

TE3N - No 1 Movie based Runner Game, a running mobile video game was developed by Zapak as an adaptation of the film.
