= Har Har Byomkesh =

2015 Indian Bengali mystery film

- Film poster
- Directed by: Arindam Sil
- Written by: Padmanabha Dasgupta
- Based on: 'Bahni-Patanga' by Sharadindu Bandyopadhyay
- Produced by: Mahendra Soni; Shrikant Mohta
- Starring: Abir Chatterjee; Ritwick Chakraborty; Sohini Sarkar
- Cinematography: Soumik Haldar
- Music by: Bickram Ghosh
- Production companies: Shree Venkatesh Films; Surinder Films
- Release date: 18 December 2015
- Country: India
- Language: Bengali
- Budget: ₹2 crore
- Box office: ₹4 crore

Har Har Byomkesh is a 2015 Indian Bengali mystery thriller film directed by Arindam Sil. The film is based on the fictional detective Byomkesh Bakshi, created by the Bengali writer Sharadindu Bandyopadhyay. The film stars Abir Chatterjee as the eponymous sleuth, while Ritwick Chakraborty enacts the role of his assistant Ajit Bandopadhyay and Sohini Sarkar helm in the shoes of Satyabati. The teaser of the film was released on 11 October 2015. The trailer was launched on 15 October 2015. The film was released on 18 December 2015.

== Plot ==
In Benaras, DSP Purandhar Pandey invites Byomkesh Bakshi, Ajit Bandopadhyay and Satyabati to a party thrown by zamindar Deepnarayan Singh at his residence to celebrate his recovery after a prolonged illness. But the very next day, Deepnarayan dies under suspicious circumstances. Byomkesh takes the responsibility of investigating his murder. He is clear about two motives - money and an illicit relationship. The list of suspects grows, even as Byomkesh discovers the painting skills of Dipnarayan's wife, Shakuntala, through a portrait of Dushyanta and Shakuntala drawn by her. The painting haunts him, though he fails to understand why. Then he learns that Deepnarayan has long been bed-ridden and that Shakuntala is pregnant. The rest of the story revolves around how Byomkesh, along with Ajit, DSP Purandhar Pandey and Satyabati, solved the mystery.

== Cast ==
- Abir Chatterjee as Byomkesh Bakshi
- Ritwick Chakraborty as Ajit Bandopadhyay
- Sohini Sarkar as Satyabati
- Nusrat Jahan as Shakuntala
- Harsh Chhaya as DSP Purandhar Pandey
- Shadab Kamal as Inspector Rathikanta Chowdhury
- Subrat Dutta as Narmadashankar
- Deepankar De as Dr. Pannalal Palit
- Soumyajit Majumdar as Dr. Prasad
- Dilip Dave as Khublal
- Joydeep Kundu as Leeladhar Bangsi
- Rachel White as Chandni
- Indradeep Dasgupta as Debnarayan Singh
- Adil Hussain as Deepnarayan Singh (special appearance)
- June Malia as Miss Manna (special appearance)
- Shinjini Kulkarni as dancer (special appearance)
- Koneenica Banerjee as singer (special appearance)
- Suvalagna (special appearance)
- Kalpana Patowary as singer (special appearance)

== Soundtrack ==
Track listing
| No. | Title | Singer(s) | Length |
|---|---|---|---|
| 1. | "Saawan Aayo Ri" | Barnali Chattopadhaya | 3:45 |
| 2. | "Roothe Sajan Kaise" | Sabina Mumtaz Islam | 2:12 |

== Production ==
=== Development ===
Shree Venkatesh Films bought the rights of Byomkesh franchise, except those with Anjan Dutt and planned to have on board more than one director to build the Byomkesh franchise. The first one from their stable is Har Har Byomkesh by Arindam Sil, based on Saradindu Bandopadhyay's Banhi Patanga. Shrikant Mohta hinted that after this film, one of the possible sequels may be directed by Sandip Ray.

=== Casting ===
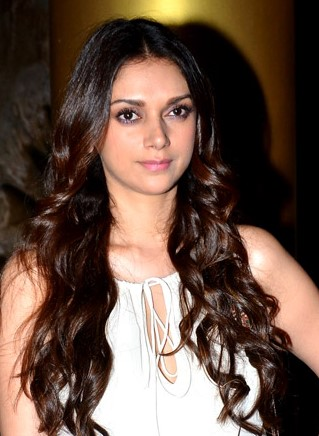
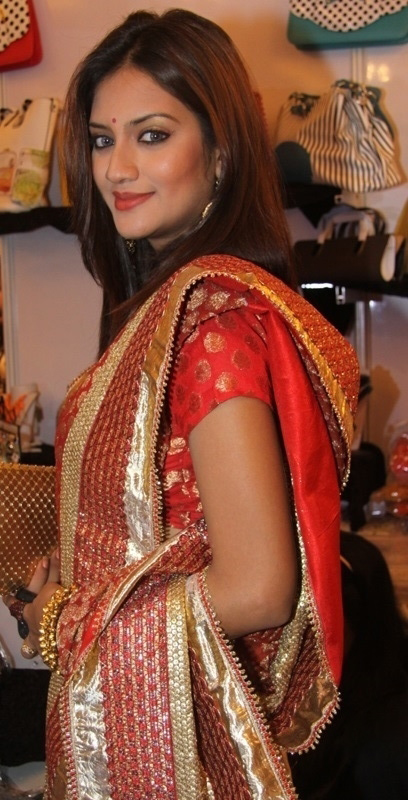
Aditi Rao Hydari (left) was replaced by Nusrat Jahan (right) .

Sohini Sarkar was selected to play the role of Satyabati. Initially, the character of Shakuntala was offered to Aditi Rao Hydari, who was recommended by Shoojit Sircar to the director, and would have made her Bengali debut. B.A. Pass actor Shadab Kamal was selected to enact the role of the main antagonist, making his debut in Bengali cinema.

Adil Hussain was selected for a supporting role. Harsh Chhaya, June Malia, Rachel White and Subrat Dutta were selected to play prominent roles. On 12 July 2015, it was announced that Aditi Rao Hydari walked out from the film and Nusrat Jahan would replace her. Actor Soumyajit Majumdar, known for his role in Aashiqui 2, was also inducted in the film's cast. Shinjini Kulkarni, granddaughter of Pandit Birju Maharaj, was hired to play a mujra sequence in the film.

=== Filming ===
Though in the book by Saradindu Bandopadhyay, Patna was the story's main backdrop, but director Arindam Sil decided to shoot the whole film with Benaras in the premise. Sil, with his crew, left to conduct a recce in Benaras on 16 June 2015. The filming commenced on 19 August 2015 at Benaras. The filming took place for 25 days in many historic places such as the Ramnagar Fort in Benaras and Kolkata. The filming ended on 13 September 2015.

=== Soundtrack ===
Bickram Ghosh is selected as the music director. Sutapa Basu penned down the lyrics for a Sawan, sung by Barnali Chattopadhyay and a Chaiti, sung by Sabina Rahman. With usage of old aged instruments Bickram Ghosh had aptly recreated the semi classical format which was popular in Benaras during the period captured in the movie. Bhojpuri singer Kalpana Patowary was confirmed to sing a bhajan, written by Sugata Guha in the film, which would pay tribute to a scene from Satyajit Ray's film on detective Feluda titled Joi Baba Felunath.

== Release ==
=== Critical response ===
The film received mixed reviews from critics. Sankhayan Ghosh of The Hindu stated "Har Har Byomkesh is a moody, engaging detective film, yet crippled by the same old problems of the genre" while The Times of India gave a rating of 4 stars out of 5.

=== Box office ===
The film was a runaway hit at the theatres.
