= Ajay Chakraborty =

Indian politician (born 1943)

Member of Parliament, Lok Sabha
- In office 10 May 1996 – 25 May 2009
- Preceded by: Manoranjan Sur
- Succeeded by: Haji Nurul Islam
- Constituency: Basirhat

Personal details
- Born: 8 December 1943 (age 82) North 24 Parganas, Bengal Presidency, British India (now West Bengal, India)
- Party: Communist Party of India
- Spouse: Chandrima Chakraborty
- Children: 1 son and 1 daughter
- As of 17 September, 2006

Ajay Chakraborty (born 8 December 1943) was a member of Lok Sabha of India. He represented the Basirhat constituency of West Bengal and is a member of the Communist Party of India (CPI) political party. He had won the Basirhat seat five times in a row, but in the 2009 Lok Sabha election he lost the Basirhat seat to Trinamool Congress candidate Haji Nurul Islam.

Lok Sabha
Preceded by Manoranjan Sur	Member of Parliament for Basirhat; 1996–2009	Succeeded by Haji Nurul Islam
