= Power (2016 film) =

2016 film by Rajiv Kumar Biswas

- Power Movie Poster
- Directed by: Rajiv Kumar Biswas
- Written by: Abhimannu Mukherjee
- Produced by: Shrikant Mohta; Nispal Singh
- Starring: Jeet; Sayantika Banerjee; Nusrat Jahan
- Music by: Jeet Gannguli
- Production company: Shree Venkatesh Films
- Distributed by: Shree Venkatesh Films; Surinder Films
- Release date: 14 April 2016
- Country: India
- Language: Bangla

Power is a 2016 Indian Bengali-language action comedy film directed by Rajiv Kumar Biswas. The film's soundtrack is composed by Jeet Gannguli. It features Jeet, Sayantika Banerjee and Nusrat Jahan in lead roles.

== Plot ==
Bir Pratap Chowdhury is a corrupt yet valiant ACP in Kolkata. He attempts to save a dreaded gangster named Joykrishna Ganguly, but loses his life and Ganguly is kidnapped by Bir Pratap's allies Biswas and Mukherjee. The Home Minister Ramkrishna Ganguly is concerned about Joykrishna Ganguly being apprehended. Upon hearing the news of Bir Pratap's death, his mother loses consciousness and is admitted to the hospital. Ramkrishna promises the people that he will apprehend Joykrishna or offer his resignation if he is not successfully doing the same.

In Kolkata, Jeetu, a doppelganger of Bir Pratap, is a happy-go-lucky guy, whose sole aim in life is to become a cop, but doesn't achieve success. He lives with his brother-in-law Bhojon Bose, who is a CI. To change his fortunes, Jeetu approaches Anjali who claims to be a trader in gemstones relating to astrology, which can change a person's fortune, but in reality she is just a con artist. She gives a ring to Jeetu, which actually has no powers.

Jeetu ends up helping his brother-in-law to apprehend a dangerous convict. However, Bhojon takes all the credit at the press meet which Jeetu also attends. Bhojon later reveals that he had rejected Jeetu's application to the police academy. However, Ramkrishna notices Jeetu on the news, and tells him to pretend as Bir Pratap and put Joykrishna Ganguly in prison. Jeetu accepts and visits to Selimpur and impersonates as Bir Pratap, and frees Joykrishna Ganguly from Biswas and Mukherjee. Jeetu takes Ganguly to Ramkrishna, but Ramkrishna stabs him and reveals that Joykrishna Ganguly is his actual brother and not Bir Pratap as he had made him believe earlier, and leaves. Biswas and Mukherjee track down Jeetu and admit him to the hospital. When Jeetu recovers, they narrate Bir Pratap's past.

Past: Biswas and Mukherjee are appointed as Bir Pratap's assistants by the police commissioner of Anti-Corruption Bureau Ranjit Kumar Kapuria to acquire proofs of Bir Pratap's corruption. Bir Pratap is always accompanied by Inspector Pradip Kumar Sarkar, a corrupt cop along with Biswas and Mukherjee everywhere. He meets Joykrishna Ganguly and makes a deal with him for a huge ransom to hand over Gopal, the only witness in the murder case of ACP Avinash and his family, who were killed by Joykrishna Ganguly and his brother Debkrishna Ganguly on the former's order.

Meanwhile, Bir Pratap falls in love with Shruti, a philanthropist who also reciprocates his feelings. To get the proof of Bir Pratap's corruption, Biswas and Mukherjee conduct a raid on his house where Shruti is also present, who is livid on Bir Pratap for maligning the goodwill of "Aasha Foundation" managed by her. Biswas and Mukherjee also find a flash drive with a list of many cops whom they suspect of being involved with Bir Pratap in his corruption scam. However, they are surprised that even they are on the same list.

Bir Pratap's uncle Rajat Pratap Chowdhury reveals that Bir Pratap's mother Nilanjana Pratap Chowdhury wanted to see him as a cop, and is admitted in a hospital for an important surgery. Bir Pratap pays ₹10 lakh as fees for the surgery but at the selection, he is asked to pay a bribe of ₹10 lakh which is most common for all candidates according to the seniors. Bir Pratap returned dejected, but lied to his mother that he was selected to make her happy. The next morning, Bir Pratap received posting orders and rushed to the hospital to show the same to his mother and uncle, but his mother died as she wished to forego the surgery to make Bir Pratap a cop. Bir Pratap then vowed to turn as a corrupt cop to pay the money on behalf of the honest candidates, who are about to join the police force without their knowledge. After this incident, Bir Pratap and Shruti get engaged.

Meanwhile, Bir Pratap kills Debkrishna and arrests Joykrishna Ganguly for killing ACP Avinash, with Gopal serving as the chief witness. When Bir Pratap is about to present Ganguly and Gopal in the high court, Inspector Pradip Kumar Sarkar sells the evidence documents for a huge bribe along with the information regarding Gopal and Bir Pratap. Acting upon this information, Ganguly's goons kill Bir Pratap's uncle and then proceed to attack Bir Pratap and Gopal at the court. However, Shruti and Gopal are killed in the hit while Bir Pratap escapes. Bir Pratap retaliates and kidnaps Ganguly from P.K's custody with the help of Biswas and Mukherjee. In the process, he meets with a car accident in a hilly area and his car, which explodes, thus killing him.

Present: Now realizing the truth, Jeetu decides to set things right. Ramkrishna provides falsified evidence against the incumbent Chief Minister of West Bengal by claiming him to be the one, who was backing Joykrishna the whole time. After this incident, the Chief Minister is forced to step down and subsequently is arrested. Later, Ramkrishna gives his nomination for the post. Joykrishna, despite being imprisoned, starts operating his crime regime from within.

Jeetu rejoins the force and heads to Ramkrishna's house and makes a deal with him so as to keep his post provided that he, Jeetu, turns a blind eye to all the activities of Joykrishna. Jeetu then becomes close to Ramkrishna's PA, Bijoy Sanyal. who becomes agitated after Ramkrishna insulted him. Jeetu introduces him to Anjali and gets her to give him a ring to change his fortunes. However, the rings are actually cameras embedded inside the fake gemstone with a microchip to capture audio. With the help of this ring, Jeetu exposes Ramkrishna's corruption to the media. Ramkrishna gets cornered and runs away "underground" along with his brother. In the process, he kidnaps Anjali, Biswas, Mukherjee, and Bhojon's Family

Meanwhile, Ranjit Kumar Kapuria, who has been following up this case with close interest unearths the fact that Bir Pratap and Jeetu are the same person. Right before the car explosion, Bir Pratap is thrown off the car and falls onto a freight carrier, rendering him unconscious and is taken to the hospital, where Bhojon is provided with the case. Bhojon's wife had lost her brother named Jeetu, long back in her childhood and has been searching for him ever since. Realizing that Bir Pratap is suffering from amnesia, Bhojon decides to pass him off as Jeetu to keep her happy, but mainly to ensure that he wouldn't have to spend huge amounts of money for her search.

Kapuria reveals this fact to Ramkrishna and Joykrishna and warns them that if Jeetu discovers the truth, the consequences will be even deadlier. Jeetu crashes into the stronghold of Joykrishna, where he kills him and arrests Ramkrishna. Biswas, Mukherjee and everyone decides not to reveal the truth to Jeetu/Bir Pratap and thus spare him the anguish over his uncle's and fiancé's death. Jeetu later marries Anjali and lives happily ever after in Kolkata while still posing as Bir Pratap Chowdhury.

== Cast ==
- Jeet as Jeetu, originally known as ACP Bir Pratap Chowdhury, Selimpur Police Station
- Sayantika Banerjee as Anjali
- Nusrat Jahan as Shruti, Bir Pratap's love interest
- Sabyasachi Chakrabarty as Police Commissioner Ranjit Kumar Kapuria
- Rajatava Dutta as Home Minister Ramkrishna Ganguly
- Kharaj Mukherjee as Officer in charge Bhojon Ghosh, Haldia Police Station
- Kanchan Mullick as Kanchan
- Dipanjan Basak as Joy Krishna Ganguly
- Shantilal Mukherjee as Hari
- Bharat Kaul as Gobardhan
- Manasi Sinha as Jeetu's elder sister
- Sumit Ganguly as Goon
- Devdut Ghosh as Inspector Pradip Kumar Sarkar
- Raja Dutta as Feroz Bhai
- Sudip Mukherjee as Inspector S. Banerjee
- Biswajit Chakraborty as Rajat Pratap Chowdhury
- Moushumi Saha as Nilanjana Pratap Chowdhury
- Sanjib Sarkar as former ACP Avinash Mondal
- Debraj Mukherjee as Inspector P. Biswas
- Kalyani Mondal as Mayawati Ganguly
- Supriyo Dutta as Bijoy Sanyal, Ramkrishna's PA
- Somnath Kar as Deb Krishna Ganguly

== Soundtrack ==
Power

Soundtrack album by Jeet Gannguli
- Released: 2016
- Recorded: 2015–2016
- Genre: Feature film soundtrack
- Length: 11:29
- Language: Bengali
- Label: SVF
- Producers: Nispal Singh; Shrikant Mohta

Jeet Gannguli chronology
| Ki Kore Toke Bolbo (2016) | Power (2016) | Love Express (2016) |

Singles from Power
- 1. "Missed Call" Released: 12 Mar 2016; 2. "Aaj Amaye" Released: 19 Mar 2016; 3. "Chakum Chukum" Released: 31 Mar 2016

All lyrics are written by Raja Chanda, Prasenjit Mukherjee; all music is composed by Jeet Gannguli.

| No. | Title | Lyrics | Singer(s) | Length |
|---|---|---|---|---|
| 1. | "Missed Call" | Raja Chanda | Nakash Aziz, Akriti Kakkar | 3:39 |
| 2. | "Aaj Amay" | Prasenjit Mukherjee | Jeet Gannguli, Anweshaa | 4:20 |
| 3. | "Chakum Chukum" | Raja Chanda | Jeet Gannguli, Monali Thakur | 3:30 |
| Total length: | | | | 11:29 |

== Reception ==
=== Critical reception ===
Sutapa Singha of The Times of India rated the film 3.5/5 stars and wrote "If Fan did not live up to your expectations or a Goutam Ghose film is not your cuppa, grab a tub of popcorn and go LOL with power. It’s a remake alright. Scene by scene to the extent that the amount of confetti flying around and the number of eggs being consumed is the same too!" She praised the costume design, cinematography and Jeet's comedic timing.
