= Manoranjan Sur =

Indian politician

Member of Parliament, Lok Sabha
- In office 1989-1996
- Preceded by: Indrajit Gupta
- Succeeded by: Ajay Chakraborty
- Constituency: Basirhat, West Bengal
- Constituency: Basirhat

Personal details
- Born: February 1918 Peorah, Noakhali, Bengal Presidency, British India
- Died: 11 November 2013 (aged 95) Kolkata
- Party: Communist Party of India
- Spouse: Mira Sur
- Children: No

Manoranjan Sur was an Indian politician. He was elected to the Lok Sabha, lower house of the Parliament of India from Basirhat in 1989 and 1991 as a member of the Communist Party of India.
