= Suzette Jordan =

Indian women's-rights activist

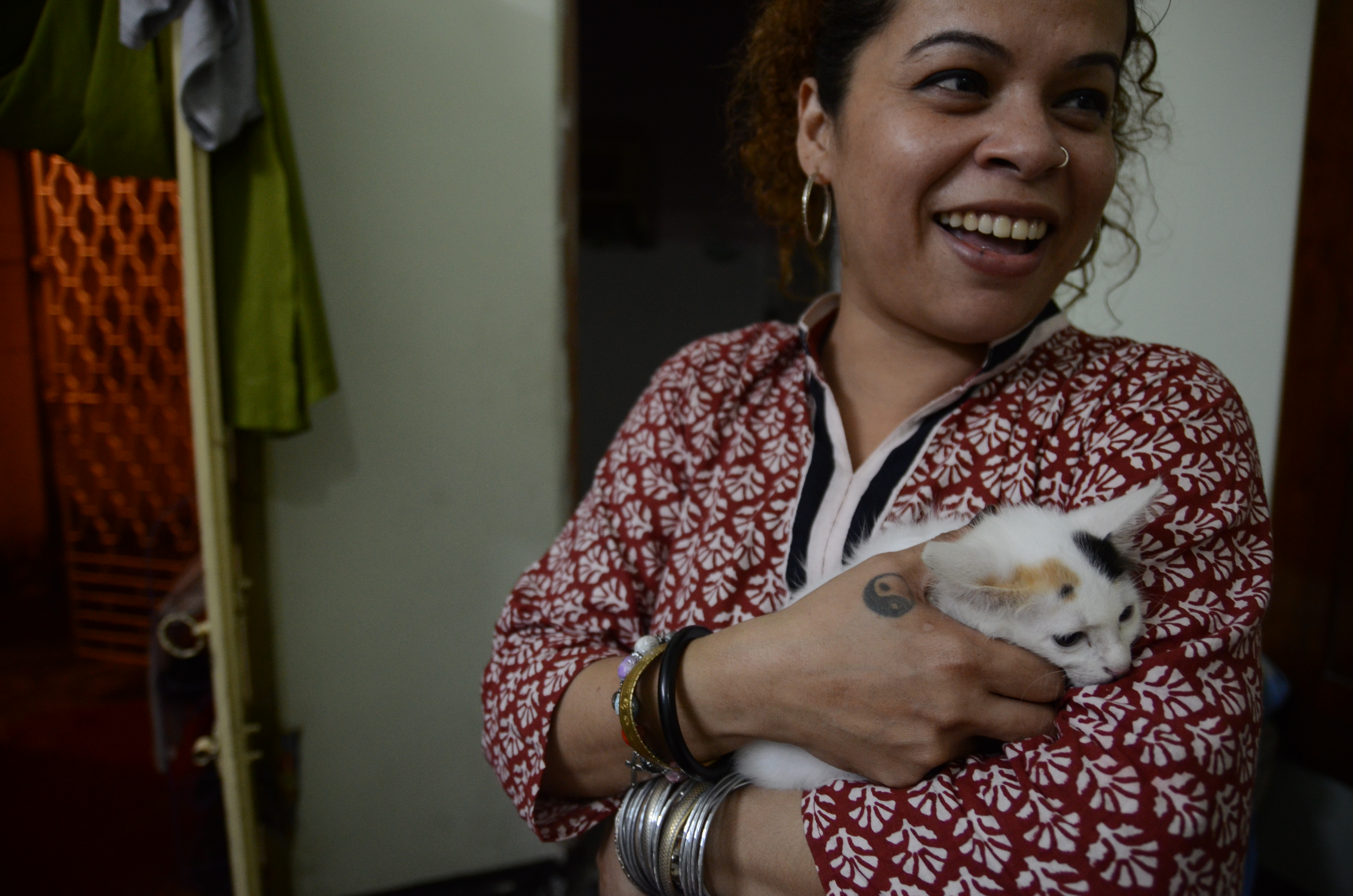
- Suzette Jordan with her cat
- Born: 21 October 1974; Kolkata, India
- Died: 15 March 2015 (aged 40); Kolkata, India
- Occupation: Women’s rights activist
- Children: 2

Suzette Jordan (21 October 1974 – 13 March 2015) was a prominent women's-rights activist and anti-rape campaigner from Kolkata, India.

== Surviving gangrape in 2012 ==
On the evening of 6 February 2012, Jordan met five youths (Kader Khan, Md. Ali, Nasir Khan, Ruman Khan and Sumit Bajaj) for the first time at a nightclub in Park Street who offered to drop her home, when she was leaving. Soon after, she was gang-raped by the five in a moving car, and later dumped near Exide Crossing, opposite the Calcutta Club. Around 3.30 am, she boarded a taxi to her residence in Behala.

=== Revealing her identity ===
In June 2013, she made the decision to publicly reveal her identity, sharing it with viewers across various news channels. While the media and police initially ensured an information blackout of the victim's name, as is customary in India, she later publicly revealed her identity as 37-year-old and a mother of two, in order to encourage other survivors to speak out.

After revealing her identity, Jordan said, "Why should I hide my identity when it was not even my fault? Why should I be ashamed of something that I did not give rise to? I was subjected to brutality, I was subjected to torture, and I was subjected to rape, and I am fighting and I will fight." At the time of her death, three of the five men accused of raping Jordan inside a moving car had been arrested and were on trial, although they denied the charges. The remaining two, including the main suspect, had not been arrested. The names of the accused are Mohommad Ali and Kader Khan (then the boyfriend of Nusrat Jahan) who were absconding, and Nasir Khan, Ruman Khan (Ruman Khan alias Tussi) and Sumit Bajaj who were in custody.

=== Outcome of case ===
One of the prime accused was Kadir Khan, the then-boyfriend of Bengali television star Nusrat Jahan (who later went on to become a member of parliament from Basirhat). Khan was picked up by West Bengal Police from a hideout in Noida five years later. As of 2020, he remains in prison.

The other accused, Naser Khan, Ruman Khan and Sumit Bajaj, were arrested in February 2012. On 10 December 2015, the city sessions court, Kolkata found all five of the accused guilty. The accused were convicted under 120 (B) (criminal conspiracy), 506 (criminal intimidation), 323 (voluntarily causing hurt), 34 (common intention), and 376(2)(g) (gang rape). The three accused in custody (Naser, Ruman and Sumit) were sentenced to 10 years of imprisonment, months after the victim died of encephalitis.

Four years after the incident, prime accused Kader Khan and Muhammad Ali were arrested on 30 September 2016 in Noida, brought back to Kolkata and produced before the court. In mid-June, 2020, Sumit Bajaj was released 20 months before his sentence ended, for 'good behaviour'.

=== Social impact ===
The case was widely debated in the media, with some political and social commentators casting aspersions on Jordan's character, and quickly became a political issue. When Jordan originally reported the crime, the chief minister of West Bengal, Mamata Banerjee, called her a liar and accused her of trying to embarrass the government, a position that provoked national outrage.

== Later activism ==
Jordan became a women's rights activist and briefly worked as a counsellor for a helpline for victims of sexual and domestic violence. She spoke up against the humiliation and discrimination against victims, for instance when she was denied entry into a Kolkata restaurant. She made use of the media, appearing in a talk show, Satyamev Jayate hosted by actor Aamir Khan, as well as through Facebook to highlight societal issues.

== Family life and death ==
Jordan was a single mother with two daughters. Her grandmother was a school principal. She had been battling a severe form of meningitis, and died at the age of 40, on 13 March 2015, of meningoencephalitis.
