= Mahasin Ali =

Indian politician

Member of the West Bengal Legislative Assembly
- In office 2016–2021
- Preceded by: Chand Mohammad
- Succeeded by: Idris Ali
- Constituency: Bhagabangola

Personal details
- Party: CPIM
- Education: Bhupendra Narayan Mandal University
- Profession: Politician

Mahasin Ali is an Indian politician from West Bengal. He was elected as a Member of the Legislative Assembly in 2016 West Bengal Legislative Assembly election from Bhagawangola constituency, as a member of the CPIM.
