= Abdul Matin Muhammad =

Indian politician

Mufti Abdul Matin Muhammad
- আব্দুল মতিন মহম্মদ
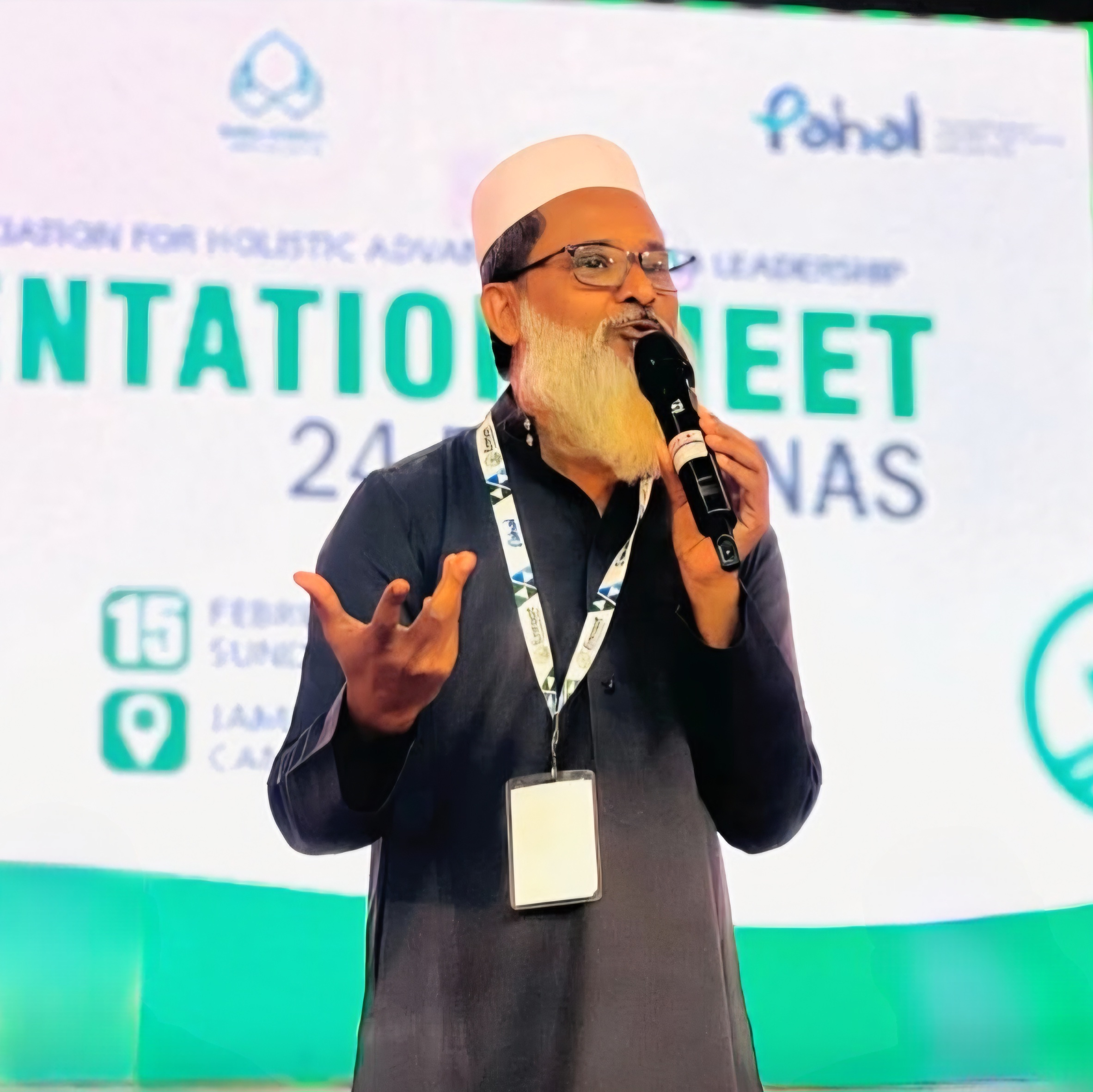

Member of the West Bengal Legislative Assembly
- Incumbent
- Assumed office 2026
- Preceded by: Sheikh Rabiul Islam
- Constituency: Haroa

Personal details
- Party: All India Trinamool Congress (until 2026); Mamata All India Trinamool Congress (from 2026)
- Education: Higher Secondary
- Occupation: Politician

Abdul Matin Muhammad (born 1974) is an Indian politician from West Bengal. He is a member of the West Bengal Legislative Assembly from the Haroa Assembly constituency in North 24 Parganas district representing the Mamata All India Trinamool Congress.

== Early life and education ==
Muhammad is from Baduria, North 24 Parganas district, West Bengal. He is the son of Muhammad Shamsur Rahaman. He passed Class 12 examinations conducted by West Bengal Council of Higher Secondary Education in 1992. He declared assets worth Rs.1 crore in his affidavit to the Election Commission of India.

== Career ==
Muhammad won the Haroa Assembly constituency representing the All India Trinamool Congress in the 2026 West Bengal Legislative Assembly election. He polled 1,17,591 votes and defeated his nearest rival, Piyarul Islam of the All India Secular Front, by a margin of 49,341 votes.

== Electoral performance ==
Election	Constituency	Party	Votes	Result
2026	Haroa	All India Trinamool Congress	117,591	Won
