= Basirhat Lok Sabha constituency =

Lok Sabha Constituency in West Bengal

Coordinates: 22°40′N 88°53′E

Basirhat WB-18
- Lok Sabha constituency
- Interactive Map Outlining Basirhat Lok Sabha Constituency

Constituency details
- Country: India
- Region: East India
- State: West Bengal
- Assembly constituencies: Baduria; Haroa; Minakhan; Sandeshkhali; Basirhat Dakshin; Basirhat Uttar; Hingalganj
- Established: 1951-present
- Total electors: 14,90,596
- Reservation: None

Member of Parliament
- 18th Lok Sabha
- Incumbent Vacant

Most Successful parties from Basirhat Lok Sabha
1. Communist Party of India (10 times) (52.6%)
2. Indian National Congress (4 times) (15.8%)
3. Trinamool Congress(4 times) (15.8%)
4. Bangla Congress (2 times) (10.5%)
5. Janata Party (1 time) (5.26%)

Basirhat Lok Sabha constituency is one of the 543 parliamentary constituencies in India. The constituency centres on Basirhat in West Bengal. All the seven assembly segments of No. 18 Basirhat Lok Sabha constituency are in North 24 Parganas district.

== Overview ==
Parliamentary constituencies in West Bengal - 1. Cooch Behar, 2. Alipurduars, 3. Jalpaiguri, 4. Darjeeling, 5. Raiganj, 6. Balurghat, 7. Maldaha Uttar, 8. Maldaha Dakshin, 9. Jangipur, 10. Baharampur, 11. Murshidabad, 12. Krishnanagar, 13. Ranaghat, 14. Bangaon, 15. Barrackpore, 16. Dum Dum, 17. Barasat, 18. Basirhat, 19. Jaynagar, 20. Mathurapur, 21. Diamond Harbour, 22. Jadavpur, 23. Kolkata Dakshin, 24. Kolkata Uttar, 25. Howrah, 26. Uluberia, 27. Serampore, 28. Hooghly, 29. Arambagh, 30. Tamluk, 31, Kanthi, 32. Ghatal, 33. Jhargram, 34. Medinipur, 35. Purulia, 36. Bankura, 37. Bishnupur, 38. Bardhaman Purba, 39. Bardhaman Durgapur, 40. Asansol, 41. Bolpur, 42. Birbhum

According to the Hindustan Times, Basirhat and Bangaon have the most porous stretch of West Bengal's 2,217 km border with Bangladesh.The Indian Express estimates the proportion of Muslims in Basirhat's electorate at 54%.

== Assembly segments ==
As per order of the Delimitation Commission in respect of the delimitation of constituencies in the West Bengal, parliamentary constituency no. 18 Basirhat is composed of the following assembly segments from 2009:

#	Name	District	MLA, from 2026	MLA's Party	2024 LS Lead
99	Baduria	North 24 Parganas	Burhanul Mukaddim	AITC	AITC
121	Haroa	North 24 Parganas	Abdul Matin Muhammad	AITC	AITC
122	Minakhan (SC)	North 24 Parganas	Usha Rani Mondal	AITC	AITC
123	Sandeshkhali (ST)	North 24 Parganas	Sanat Sardar	BJP	BJP
124	Basirhat Dakshin	North 24 Parganas	Surajit Mitra	AITC	AITC
125	Basirhat Uttar	North 24 Parganas	Tauseffur Rahman	AITC	AITC
126	Hingalganj (SC)	North 24 Parganas	Rekha Patra	BJP	AITC

== Members of Parliament ==
Year	Member	Party
1952	Renu Chakravartty	Communist Party of India
1952	Patiram Roy	Indian National Congress
1957	Renu Chakravartty	Communist Party of India
1957	Pareshnath Kayal	Indian National Congress
1962	Humayun Kabir	Indian National Congress
1967	Humayun Kabir	Bangla Congress
1970^	Sardar Amjad Ali	Bangla Congress
1971	A. K. M. Ishaque	Indian National Congress
1977	Alhaj M.A. Hannan	Janata Party
1980	Indrajit Gupta	Communist Party of India
1984	Indrajit Gupta	Communist Party of India
1989	Manoranjan Sur	Communist Party of India
1991	Manoranjan Sur	Communist Party of India
1996	Ajay Chakraborty	Communist Party of India
1998	Ajay Chakraborty	Communist Party of India
1999	Ajay Chakraborty	Communist Party of India
2004	Ajay Chakraborty	Communist Party of India
2009	Haji Nurul Islam	Trinamool Congress
2014	Idris Ali	Trinamool Congress
2019	Nusrat Jahan	Trinamool Congress
2024	Haji Nurul Islam	Trinamool Congress
2026^		

.* In 1951 and 1957, Basirhat has dual seats.

^ By-election.

== Election results ==
=== 2026 by-election ===
2026 Basirhat by-election: Basirhat
Party	Candidate	Votes	%	±%
BJP				
NCPI				
DTC				
AJUP				
AIFB				
INC				
NOTA	None of the above			
MAITC				
Majority				
Turnout				
gain from		Swing		

=== General election 2024 ===
2024 Indian general election: Basirhat
Party	Candidate	Votes	%	±%
AITC	Haji Nurul Islam	803,762	52.76	▼1.80
BJP	Rekha Patra	470,215	30.87	▲0.75
AISF	Akhtar Rahaman Biswas	123,500	8.11	new
CPI(M)	Nirapada Sardar	77,899	5.11	▲0.34
NOTA	None of the above	5,248	0.34	▼0.30
Majority		333,547	21.89	
Turnout		15,23,401		
AITC hold		Swing		

=== General election 2019 ===
2019 Indian general elections: Basirhat
Party	Candidate	Votes	%	±%
AITC	Nusrat Jahan Ruhi	782,078	54.56	+15.91
BJP	Sayantan Basu	431,709	30.12	+11.76
INC	Quazi Abdur Rahim	104,183	7.27	−0.75
CPI	Pallab Sengupta	68,316	4.77	−25.27
NOTA	None of the Above	9,106	0.64	−0.14
Majority		350,369	24.4	
Turnout		1,433,769	85.43	TBA
AITC hold		Swing		

=== General election 2014 ===
2014 Indian general elections: Basirhat
Party	Candidate	Votes	%	±%
AITC	Idris Ali	492,326	38.65	−7.55
CPI	Nurul Sekh	3,82,667	30.04	−10.34
BJP	Samik Bhattacharya	2,33,887	18.36	+11.81
INC	Abdur Rahim Kazi	1,02,137	8.02	N/A
AIUDF	Siddiqullah Chowdhury	25,178	1.97	−2.01
Independent	Ranjit Gayen	8,088	0.63	−0.70
BSP	Gopal Das	7,016	0.55	−0.18
SUCI(C)	Ajay Kumar Bain	6,532	0.51	N/A
Independent	Md. Hafiz	5,976	0.46	N/A
None of the Above	None of the Above	9,971	0.78	N/A
Majority		1,09,659	8.61	+2.89
Turnout		12,73,771	85.45	−1.17
AITC hold		Swing	-7.55	

=== General election 2009 ===
2009 Indian general elections: Basirhat
Party	Candidate	Votes	%	±%
AITC	Sk. Nurul Islam	4,79,650	45.92	
CPI	Ajay Chakraborty	4,19,267	40.20	
BJP	Swapan Kumar Das	67,690	6.51	
AIUDF	Siddiqullah Chowdhury	41,338	3.98	
Independent	Ranjit Gain	13,888	1.33	
BSP	Jiaul Haque	7,590	0.73	
LJP	Chhalauddin Molla	4,239	0.40	
IUML	Salim Makkar	4,023	0.38	
Majority		60,383	5.72	
Turnout		10,38,209	86.62	
AITC gain from CPI		Swing		

2009 Indian general election West Bengal summary
Party	Seats won	Seat change	Vote percentage
Trinamool Congress	19	▲18	31.8
Indian National Congress	6	▲0	13.45
Socialist Unity Centre of India (Communist)	1	▲1	NA
Communist Party of India (Marxist)	9	▼17	33.1
Communist Party of India	2	▼1	3.6
Revolutionary Socialist Party	2	▼1	3.56
Forward bloc	2	▼1	3.04
Bharatiya Janata Party	1	▲1	6.14

=== General elections 1951-2004 ===
Basirhat was double-member constituency in 1951 and 1957. Thereafter, it was a single seat constituency. Most of the contests were multi-cornered. However, only winners and runners-up are mentioned below:

Year	Winner Candidate	Winner Party	Runner-up Candidate	Runner-up Party
1951	Renu Chakravartty	Communist Party of India		
	Satya Hari Dutta	Indian National Congress	Patiram Roy	Indian National Congress
1957	Paresh Nath Kayal	Indian National Congress		
	Renu Chakravartty	Communist Party of India	Pratima Bose	Indian National Congress
1962	Humayun Kabir	Indian National Congress	Abdur Razzak Khan	Communist Party of India
1967	Humayun Kabir	Bangla Congress	A.K.M Ishaque	Indian National Congress
1969 (Bye election)	Sardar Amjad Ali	Bangla Congress	K.A.Makkar	PML
1971	A.K.M. Ishaque	Indian National Congress	Md. Abdulla Rasul	Communist Party of India (Marxist)
1977	Alhaj M A Hannan	Janata Party	A.K.M.Ishaque	Indian National Congress
1980	Indrajit Gupta	Communist Party of India	Abdul Gaffar Quazi	Indian National Congress (I)
1984	Indrajit Gupta	Communist Party of India	Kamal Basu	Indian National Congress
1989	Monoranjan Sur	Communist Party of India	Sardar Amjad Ali	Indian National Congress
1991	Monoranjan Sur	Communist Party of India	Sardar Amjad Ali	Indian National Congress
1996	Ajay Chakraborty	Communist Party of India	Dilip Majumder	Indian National Congress
1998	Ajay Chakraborty	Communist Party of India	Sudipto Roy	Trinamool Congress
1999	Ajay Chakraborty	Communist Party of India	M Nuruzzaman	All India Trinamool Congress
2004	Ajay Chakraborty	Communist Party of India	Sujit Bose	All India Trinamool Congress

== See also ==
- Basirhat
- List of constituencies of the Lok Sabha
