= Chand Mohammad (West Bengal politician) =

Indian politician

Member of the West Bengal Legislative Assembly
- In office 2006–2016
- Preceded by: Mojibor Rahaman
- Succeeded by: Mahasin Ali
- Constituency: Bhagabangola

Personal details
- Born: 1967 (age 58–59) Bhagwangola, West Bengal, India
- Party: Trinamool Congress (2014–Present); Samajwadi Party (2011–2014); West Bengal Socialist Party (1996–2011)
- Education: Kankha Rahimia High School Madrasah (10th pass in 1981)

Chand Mohammad is an Indian politician. He was elected as MLA of Bhagabangola Vidhan Sabha Constituency in 2006 and 2011. He is an Trinamool Congress politician.
