= Ribhu Dasgupta =

Indian film director

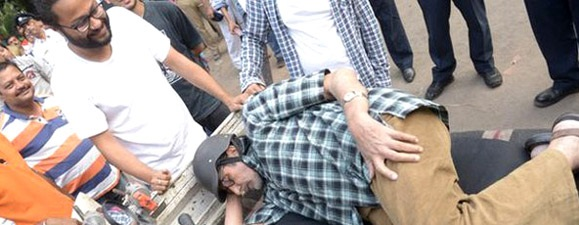
- Ribhu Dasgupta (standing) with Amitabh Bachchan, during the shooting of Te3n
- Born: Kolkata, India
- Occupation: Film director
- Notable work: Te3n
- Parent(s): Raja Dasgupta, Chaitalli Dasgupta
- Relatives: Harisadhan Dasgupta, Sonali Senroy Dasgupta, Sohag Sen, Birsa Dasgupta

Ribhu Dasgupta is an Indian film and television director. He made his directorial debut with 2011 film Michael.

He was nominated at the Shanghai International Film Festival for Asian New Talent Award of Best Film for the film Michael.

== Biography ==
Born in Kolkata, Ribhu's father, Raja Dasgupta, and grandfather, Harisadhan Dasgupta, are a filmmaker and noted documentary filmmaker, respectively. Bengali filmmaker Birsa Dasgupta is his brother in relation. Towards the end of 2004 he went to Mumbai from Kolkata and stayed with his brother Birsa. In Mumbai he worked as an assistant to filmmaker Anurag Kashyap. His first film as an assistant director was 1971, which was directed by Amrit Sagar.

== Filmography ==
Year	Title	Credited as		Notes
Year	Title	Director	Writer	Notes
2011	Michael	Yes	Story	Directorial debut
2014	Yudh	Yes	No	TV series
2016	Te3n	Yes	No	
2019	Bard of Blood	Yes	No	Netflix series
2021	The Girl on the Train	Yes	Yes	Netflix film
2022	Code Name: Tiranga	Yes	Yes	
2023	Section 34	Yes	Yes	
