= London Indian Film Festival =

- Location: London
- Language: International
- Website: http://www.londonindianfilmfestival.co.uk/

London Indian Film Festival is a film festival established in 2010 to showcase Indian independent film. The festival attracted media attention in its first year, premiering films such as "Love Sex aur Dhokha" by Dibakar Banerjee. Awards given at the festival include a short film competition award and an Audience Prize. It is Europe's largest South Asian Film Festival and is sponsored by the BFI's National Lottery Audience Fund.

== Origin ==
The London Indian Film Festival was first held in 2010 and aims to celebrate independent films from Indian, Pakistani and Bangladeshi creators, giving a glimpse into issues faced on the sub-continent through art and culture.

The festival has been backed by the Bagri Foundation since 2015 and now takes place in 13 cinemas across London, Birmingham and Manchester.

Every year, the festival holds an annual competition for independent filmmakers called the Satyajit Ray Short Film Competition, which offers £1000 to the winner and screens 6 shortlisted entries.
