= List of songs recorded by Neha Kakkar =

Neha Kakkar discography
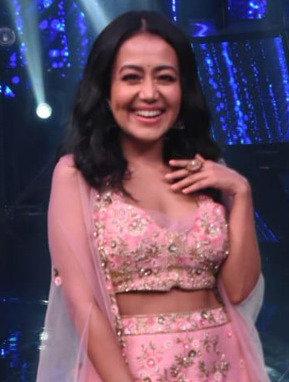
- Kakkar on the sets of Indian Idol in 2020
- Hindi songs: 125
- Non-film songs: 93
- Non-Hindi film songs: 16
- Bengali film songs: 4
- Total: 238

Neha Kakkar (born 6 June 1988) is an Indian singer who works in Bollywood. The following is a list of the songs sung by Kakkar.

== Hindi film songs ==
=== 2008 ===
Film	Song	Composer(s)	Writer(s)	Co-singer(s)
Meerabai Not Out	"Hai Rama"	Sandesh Shandilya	Sandesh Shandilya, Ashish Puri	Sukhwinder Singh

=== 2009 ===
Film	Song	Composer(s)	Writer(s)	Co-singer(s)
Blue	"Blue Theme"	A.R. Rahman	Raqeeb Alam, Sukhwinder Singh	Blaaze, Raqeeb Alam, Sonu Kakkar, Jaspreet Jasz, Dilshaad Shaikh
Bal Ganesh 2 (Note: A Hindi-language animated films)	"De Taali" (Original Mix)	Shamir Tandon	Tony Kakkar	Neeraj Shridhar, Sonu Kakkar, Suresh Wadkar
Bal Ganesh 2	"De Taali" (Panda Mix)	Shamir Tandon	Tony Kakkar	Neeraj Shridhar, Sonu Kakkar
Bal Ganesh 2	"De Taali" (Power Of Sukhwinder)	Shamir Tandon	Tony Kakkar	Sukhwinder Singh, Neeraj Shridhar, Sonu Kakkar, Suresh Wadkar
Bal Ganesh 2	"De Taali" (Sa Re Ga Ma Pa Li'l Champs 2009)	Shamir Tandon	Tony Kakkar	Sukhwinder Singh, Sonu Kakkar, Suresh Wadkar, Neeraj Shridhar, Prateeksha Srivasatav, Shreyasi Bhattacharya, Hemant Brijwasi, Yatharth Rastogi, Swarit Shukl

=== 2010 ===
Film	Song	Composer(s)	Writer(s)	Co-singer(s)
Pangaa Gang	"Mera Item No. Ghazab Ka Hai" (Note: A remix version of the track has been included in the soundtrack album)	Shamir Tandon	Virag Mishra	Anushka Manchanda
Pangaa Gang	"Pangaa Gang" (Remix)	Shamir Tandon	Virag Mishra	Raaj, Amjad, Tony Kakkar

=== 2011 ===
Film	Song	Composer(s)	Writer(s)	Co-singer(s)
Not a Love Story	"Woh Ek Pal Chhina Kal"	Sandeep Chowta	Shabbir Ahmed	Arijit Datta

=== 2012 ===
Film	Song	Composer(s)	Writer(s)	Co-singer(s)
Mr. Bhatti on Chutti	"Good Boys Bad Boys"	Tony Kakkar	Tony Kakkar	Bandana Sharma, Sonu Kakkar
Cocktail	"Second Hand Jawani"	Pritam	Amitabh Bhattacharya	Miss Pooja, Nakash Aziz

=== 2013 ===
Film	Song	Composer(s)	Writer(s)	Co-singer(s)
Sixteen	"Chadh Gayi Re"	Prashant Pillai	Tony Kakkar	Tony Kakkar, Sanker Sharma
Phata Poster Nikhla Hero	"Dhating Nach"	Pritam	Irshad Kamil	Nakash Aziz
Prague	"Botal Khol"	Atif Afzal	Varun Grover	Adarsh Singh Rathore
Ramaiya Vastavaiya	"Jadoo Ki Jhappi" (Version 1)	Sachin–Jigar	Priya Saraiya	Mika Singh
Ramaiya Vastavaiya	"Jadoo Ki Jhappi" (Version 2)	Sachin–Jigar	Priya Saraiya	Mika Singh
Ammaa Ki Boli	"Surmayee"	Manoj Santoshi	Sajan Agarwal	Neha Kakkar

=== 2014 ===
Film	Song	Composer(s)	Writer(s)	Co-singer(s)
Yaariyan	"Sunny Sunny"	Yo Yo Honey Singh	Yo Yo Honey Singh	Yo Yo Honey Singh
Queen	"London Thumakda"	Amit Trivedi	Anvita Dutt	Labh Janjua, Sonu Kakkar
The Shaukeens	"Manali Trance"	Yo Yo Honey Singh	Sahil Kaushal	Lil Golu

=== 2015 ===
Film	Song	Composer(s)	Writer(s)	Co-singer(s)
Monsoon	"Rasleela"	Santokh Singh	Sunil Chaudhari	Santokh Singh
Ek Paheli Leela	"Ek Do Teen Chaar"	Tony Kakkar	Tony Kakkar	Tony Kakkar
Barkhaa	"Naughty No 1"	Amjad - Nadeem	Sameer Anjan	Amjad Khan
Kuch Kuch Locha Hai	"Daaru Peeke Dance"	Amjad - Nadeem	Sameer Anjan	Aishwarya Nigam
Gabbar Is Back	"Aao Raja"	Yo Yo Honey Singh	Sahil Kaushal	Yo Yo Honey Singh
Calendar Girls	"We Will Rock the World"	Meet Bros Anjjan	Kumaar	Meet Bros Anjjan, Khushboo Grewal
Hate Story 3	"Tu Isaq Mera"	Meet Bros Anjjan	Kumaar	Earl Edgar
Charlie Kay Chakkar Mein	"I Am Single"	Harry Anand	Harry Anand	Harry Anand, AJ Singh
Charlie Kay Chakkar Mein	"Charlie Kay Chakkar Mein" (Duet)	Vishal-Seagal	Sandeep Nath	Abhijeet Sawant
Dilwale	"Tukur Tukur"	Pritam	Amitabh Bhattacharya	Arijit Singh, Kanika Kapoor, Siddharth Mahadevan, Nakash Aziz

=== 2016 ===
Film	Song	Composer(s)	Writer(s)	Co-singer(s)
Mastizaade	"Dekhega Raja Trailer"	Anand Raj Anand	Anand Raj Anand	Nakash Aziz
Ki & Ka	"Pump It (The Workout Song)"	Meet Bros	Kumaar	Nakash Aziz
Sanam Re	"Humne Pee Rakhi Hai"	Epic Bhangra	Ikka Singh, Kumaar	Jaz Dhami, Ikka Singh
Sanam Re	"Akkad Bakkad"	Badshah	Badshah	Badshah
Loveshhuda	"Dono Ke Dono"	Parichay	Manoj Yadav	Parichay
Loveshhuda	"Chitta Kukkad"	Parichay	Yuvraj Goel	Gippy Grewal
Kapoor & Sons	"Kar Gayi Chull"	Amaal Mallik	Amaal Mallik	Badshah, Fazilpuria, Sukirti Kakar
Baaghi	"Lets Talk About Love"	Manj Musik	Sabbir Khan	Raftaar
One Night Stand	"Do Peg Maar"	Tony Kakkar	Kumaar	
Kerry on Kutton	"Dheere Dheere"	Rishabh-Himanshu-Shivam	Ashok Yadav	
Baar Baar Dekho	"Kala Chashma"	Prem Hardeep	Amrik Singh, Kumaar	Amar Arshi, Badshah
Tum Bin 2	"Ki Kariye Nachna Aaonda Nahin"	Gourav Roshin	Jasbir Phullawalia	Hardy Sandhu, Raftaar
Wajah Tum Ho	"Maahi Ve"	Gourav Roshin	Kumaar	Amit Gupta
Force 2	"O Janiya"	Gourav Roshin	Kumaar	
Fever	"Mile Ho Tum Humko (Reprise)"	Tony Kakkar	Tony Kakkar	Tony Kakkar
Dangal	"Naina"	Pritam	Amitabh Bhattacharya	
Jugni	"Joban Hai Shawa"	Clinton Cerejo	Shellee	
Jugni	"Jugni (Unplugged)"	Clinton Cerejo	Shellee	

=== 2017 ===
Film	Song	Composer(s)	Writer(s)	Co-singer(s)
Badrinath Ki Dulhania	"Badri Ki Dulhania"	Tanishk Bagchi	Shabbir Ahmed	Dev Negi, Ikka Singh, Monali Thakur
Machine	"Cheez Badi"	Tanishk Bagchi	Anand Bakshi	Udit Narayan
Raabta	"Main Tera Boyfriend"	Sourav Roy, Meet Bros	Kumaar	Arijit Singh, Roach Killa
Babumoshai Bandookbaaz	"Ghungta"	Gaurav Dagaonkar	Ghalib Asad Bhopali	
Poster Boys	"Kudiya Shehar Diyan"	Tanishk Bagchi	Shabbir Ahmed, Javed Akhtar	Daler Mehndi
The Final Exit	"Dum Maro Dum Maro"	Amjad Nadeem	Amjad Nadeem	Raftaar, Yasser Desai
Bhoomi	"Trippy Trippy"	Sachin–Jigar	Priya Saraiya	Benny Dayal, Badshah
Judwaa 2	"Chalti Hai Kya 9 Se 12"	Sandeep Shirodkar	Dev Kohli	Dev Negi
Judwaa 2	"Oonchi Hai Building 2.0"	Sandeep Shirodkar	Dev Kohli	Anu Malik
Judwaa 2	"Aa Toh Sahi"	Meet Bros	Sonu Saggu	Meet Bros, Roach Killa
Patel Ki Punjabi Shaadi	"Meri Mehandi"	Lalit Pandit	Sanjay Chhel	Shaan, Parthiv Gohil
Patel Ki Punjabi Shaadi	"Maro Line"	Lalit Pandit	Sanjay Chhel	Aishwarya Nigam
Fukrey Returns	"Mehbooba"	Prem-Hardeep	Kumaar	Raftaar, Yasser Desai, Mohammed Rafi
Ranchi Diaries	"Udega Helicopter"	Tony Kakkar	Tony Kakkar	Tony Kakkar

=== 2018 ===
Film	Song	Composer(s)	Writer(s)	Co-singer(s)
Sonu Ke Titu Ki Sweety	"Chhote Chhote Peg"	Yo Yo Honey Singh	Yo Yo Honey Singh	Yo Yo Honey Singh, Navraj Hans
Hate Story 4	"Aashiq Banaya Aapne" (Re-make)	Tanishk Bagchi	Manoj Muntashir	Himesh Reshammiya
Hate Story 4	"Mohabbat Nasha Hai"	Tony Kakkar	Kumaar	Tony Kakkar
Veere Di Wedding	"Bhangra Da Sajda"	Shashwat Sachdev	Gaurav Solanki	Romy, Shashwat Sachdev
Veere ki wedding	"Talli Tonight"	Meet Bros	Kumaar	Meet Bros, Deep Money
Fanney Khan	"Halka Halka (Unplugged)"	Amit Trivedi	Irshad Kamil	
Game Paisa Ladki	"Ayyashiyan Ayyashiyan"	Dev Sikdar	Sajan Agarwal	Aman Trikha, Varun Likhate
Satyameva Jayate	"Dilbar"	Tanishk Bagchi	Shabbir Ahmed	Dhvani Bhanushali, Ikka Singh
Loveyatri	"Dholida"	Tanishk Bagchi	Shabbir Ahmed	Udit Narayan, Palak Muchhal
Badhaai Ho	"Morni Banke"	Tanishk Bagchi	Mellow D	Guru Randhawa
Badhaai Ho	"Nain Na Jodeen"	Rochak Kohli	Kumaar	Ayushmann Khurrana
Baazaar	"La La La"	Bilal Saeed	Bilal Saeed	Bilal Saeed
Tina & Lolo	"Tension Wali Raat"	Arko Pravo Mukherjee	Arko Pravo Mukherjee	Farhad Bhiwandiwala
K.G.F: Chapter 1	"Gali Gali"	Tanishk Bagchi	Anand Bakshi	
Simmba	"Aankh Maarey"	Tanishk Bagchi	Shabbir Ahmed	Mika Singh, Kumar Sanu
Simmba	"Mera Wala Dance"	Lijo George-DJ Chetas	Kumaar	Nakash Aziz

=== 2019 ===
Film	Song	Composer(s)	Writer(s)	Co-singer(s)
Fraud Saiyyan	"Chamma Chamma"	Tanishk Bagchi	Shabbir Ahmed	Romy, Arun, Ikka Singh
Luka Chuppi	"Coca Cola"	Tanishk Bagchi	Mellow D	Tony Kakkar, Young Desi
De De Pyaar De	"Hauli Hauli"	Tanishk Bagchi	Mellow D	Garry Sandhu
Student of the Year 2	"The Hook Up Song"	Vishal–Shekhar	Kumaar	Shekhar Ravjiani
Hume Tumse Pyaar Kitna	"Humne Rait Pe"	Tony Kakkar	Sajan Agarwal	Tony Kakkar
Jabariya Jodi	"Ki Honda Pyaar" (Female Version)	Vishal Mishra	Raj Shekhar	Vishal Mishra
Batla House	"O Saki Saki"	Vishal-Shekhar, Tanishk Bagchi	Dev Kohli, Tanishk Bagchi	Tulsi Kumar, B Praak
Made In China	"Odhani"	Sachin–Jigar	Niren Bhatt, Jigar Saraiya	Darshan Raval
Marjaavaan	"Ek Toh Kum Zindagani"	Tanishk Bagchi	Tanishk Bagchi, A. M. Turaz	Yash Narvekar
Pagalpanti	"Tum Par Hum Hai Atke"	Tanishk Bagchi	Shabbir Ahmed	Mika Singh
The body	"Aaina"	Arko	Arko	Arko,Tulsi Kumar
Pati Patni Aur Woh	"Dheeme Dheeme"	Tony Kakkar, Tanishk Bagchi	Tony Kakkar, Tanishk Bagchi	Tony Kakkar
Pati Patni Aur Woh	"Tu Hi Yaar Mera"	Rochak Kohli	Kumaar	Arijit Singh
Good Newwz	"Laal Ghaghra"	Tanishk Bagchi, Herbie Sahara	Tanishk Bagchi, Manj Musik–Herbie Sahara	Manj Musik, Herbie Sahara

=== 2020 ===
Film	Song	Composer(s)	Writer(s)	Co-singer(s)
Jai Mummy Di	"Lamborghini"	Meet Bros		
Street Dancer 3D	"Garmi"	Badshah	Badshah	Badshah
Shubh Mangal Zyada Saavdhan	"Ooh La La"	Tanishk Bagchi, Tony Kakkar	Tony Kakkar	Tony Kakkar, Sonu Kakkar
Ginny Weds Sunny	"Saawan Mein Lag Gayi"	Payal Dev	Mohsin Shaikh, Payal Dev, Badshah	Mika Singh, Badshah
Coolie No. 1	"Teri Bhabhi"	Javed-Mohsin	Danish Sabri	Javed-Mohsin, Dev Negi

=== 2021 ===
Film	Song	Composer(s)	Writer(s)	Co-singer(s)
Tuesdays and Fridays	"Ashleel"	Tony Kakkar	Tony Kakkar	Nakash Aziz
Tuesdays and Fridays	"Phone Mein"	Tony Kakkar	Tony Kakkar	
Tuesdays and Fridays	"Akhiyan"	Tony Kakkar	Tony Kakkar	Tony Kakkar, Bohemia
The Girl On The Train	"Matlabi Yariyan"	Vipin Patwa	Kumaar	
Bunty Aur Babli 2	"Tattoo Waaliye"	Shankar–Ehsaan–Loy	Amitabh Bhattacharya	Pardeep Sran
Tadap	"Ae Dilla Marjaaniyaan"	Pritam	Irshad Kamil	

=== 2022 ===
Film	Song	Composer(s)	Writer(s)	Co-singer(s)
Badhaai Do	"Gol Gappa"	Amit Trivedi	Anvita Dutt	Amit Trivedi
Govinda Naam Mera	"Bijli"	Sachin-Jigar	Vayu	Mika Singh, Sachin Sanghvi, Jigar Saraiya
Govinda Naam Mera	"Bijli" (Remix)	Sachin-Jigar	Vayu	Mika Singh, Sachin Sanghvi, Jigar Saraiya, Dj Chetas
Shabaash Mithu	"Agaaz Hai Tu"	Amit Trivedi	Swanand Kirkire	

=== 2023 ===
Film	Song	Composer(s)	Writer(s)	Co-singer(s)
Hunter Tootega Nahi Todega	"Daiyya Daiyya"	Haroon-Gavin	Siddhant Kaushal	
Dream Girl 2	"Jamnapar"	Meet Bros	Kumaar, Jonita Gandhi	Meet Bros, Samaira, Manumi
Jaane Jaan	"Title Track"	Sachin-Jigar	Rajendra Krishan	
Jawan	"Eeram Theme"	Anirudh Ravichander	Kausar Munir	
Yaariyan 2	"Blue Hai Paani"	Yo Yo Honey Singh, Khaalif	Yo Yo Honey Singh, Khaalif	Arijit Singh
Yaariyan 2	"Sunny Sunny 2.0"	Yo Yo Honey Singh, Khaalif	Yo Yo Honey Singh, Khaalif	Yo Yo Honey Singh
Yaariyan 2	"Kho Sa Gaya"	Manan Bhardwaj, Yo Yo Honey Singh	Manan Bhardwaj, Yo Yo Honey Singh	Manan Bhardwaj, Yo Yo Honey Singh
Yaariyan 2	"Suit Patiwala"	Manan Bhardwaj	Manan Bhardwaj	Guru Randhawa, Manan Bhardwaj
Yaariyan 2	"Heer Bhi Roye–Film Version"	Manan Bhardwaj	Manan Bhardwaj	

=== 2024 ===
Film	Song	Composer(s)	Writer(s)	Co-singer(s)
Love Sex Aur Dhokha 2	"Kamsin Kali"	Tony Kakkar	Tony Kakkar	Tony Kakkar
Ulajh	"Shaukan"	Shashwat Sachdev	Kumaar	Jubin Nautiyal, Shashwat Sachdev
Khel Khel Mein	"Hauli Hauli"	Guru Randhawa	Guru Randhawa	Yo Yo Honey Singh, Guru Randhawa
Jahangir National University	"Miss Call"	Amjad Nadeem Aamir	Vinay Sharma	Sukhwinder Singh
Jahangir National University	"Miss Call–Female Version"	Amjad Nadeem Aamir	Vinay Sharma	

=== 2025 ===
Film	Song	Composer(s)	Writer(s)	Co-singer(s)
Son of Sardar 2	"Nachdi"	Tejwant Kittu	Albel Brar	
Ek Deewane Ki Deewaniyat	"Bol Kaffara Kya Hoga"	Dj Chetas & Lijo George	Sameer Anjaan	Farhan Sabri

=== 2026 ===
Film	Song	Composer(s)	Writer(s)	Co-singer(s)
The Paradise	"Jhoom Le Zara (Hindi)"	Anirudh Ravichander	Ritesh G Rao	Romy

== Non-Hindi film songs ==
Year	Film	Song	Language	Composer(s)	Writer(s)	Co-singer(s)
2010	Thamassu	"Nodu Baare"	Kannada	Sandeep Chowta	Agni Shridhar	Master Saleem
2010	Thamassu	"Thamassu" (Title song)	Kannada	Sandeep Chowta	Agni Shridhar	
2010	Kedi	"Neeve Na Neeve Na"	Telugu	Sandeep Chowta	Chinni Charan	Arijit Singh
2010	Kedi	"Jaaniya Jaane"	Telugu	Sandeep Chowta	Sandeep Chowta	
2014	Ala Ela	"Dhanak Dhanak"	Telugu	Bheems Ceciroleo	Sirivennela Seetharama Sastry	
2014	Bindaas	"Party Shoes"	Bengali	Savvy Gupta		Shadaab Hashmi
2014	Bindaas	"Remix Qawwali"	Bengali	Savvy Gupta		Nakash Aziz
2014	Yoddha: The Warrior	"Desi Chhori"	Bengali	Savvy Gupta		Shadaab Hashmi
2015	Oh Yaara Ainvayi Ainvayi Lut Gaya	"Khet"	Punjabi	Jatinder Shah	Happy Raikoti	Jassi Gill
2016	Needhi Singh	"Saare Punjab Ne"	Punjabi	DJGK	Gurnazar	
2017	Jindua	"Beauty Parlor"	Punjabi	Jaidev Kumar	Ikka Singh	
2019	Do Dooni Panj	"Fikar"	Punjabi	Badshah	Vinder Nathu Majra	Rahat Fateh Ali Khan
2020	Street Dancer 3D	"Olamme"	Telugu	Badshah	Ramajogayya Sastry	Mellow D
2020	Street Dancer 3D	"Kaadhal Theeye"	Tamil	Badshah	Veeramani Kannan	Mellow D
2022	Oye Makhna	"Chad Gayi Chad Gayi"	Punjabi	Avvy Sra	Happy Rajkoti	Ammy Virk

== Non-film Songs ==
Year	Song	Composer(s)	Writer(s)	Co-singer(s)
2013	"Hanju"	Tony Kakkar		Meiyang Chang
2013	"Hanju (DJ AKS Remix)"	Tony Kakkar		Meiyang Chang
2014	"Johny Ho Dafaa"	Tony Kakkar		Tony Kakkar
2015	"Maa Tu Bata"	Tony Kakkar		Tony Kakkar
2015	"Akhiyan"	Tony Kakkar		Bohemia, Tony Kakkar
2015	"Akhiyan (DJ AKS Remix)"	Tony Kakkar		Bohemia, Tony Kakkar
2015	"Akhiyan Unplugged"	Tony Kakkar		Bohemia, Tony Kakkar
2015	"Pyaar Te Jaguar"	JSL Singh	Yuvraj Sandhu, Harshit Tomar	Harshit Tomar, JSL Singh
2015	"Wedding Da Season"	Amaal Malik	Kumaar	Mika Singh
2015	"Car Mein Music Baja"	Tony Kakkar		
2016	"Patt Lainge"	Dr Zeus	Kamal Kharoud	Gippy Grewal
2016	"Bad Wali Feeling"	Indeep Bakshi, Sachh	Indeep Bakshi	
2016	"Gal Ban Gayi"	Meet Bros	Kumaar	Yo Yo Honey Singh, Sukhbir
2016	"Phone Mein Teri Photo"	Tony Kakkar		
2016	"Das Ki Karan"	Tony Kakkar		Falak Shabir
2017	"Ring"	Jatinder Jeetu	Surjit Khairwala	
2017	"Suroor"	Bilal Saeed		
2018	"Oh Humsafar"	Tony Kakkar	Manoj Muntashir	Tony Kakkar
2018	"Mastang"	Deep Jandu	Veet Baljit	Jassi Chhokar
2018	"La La La"	Bilal Saeed		Arjun Kanungo
2018	"Nikle Currant"	Sukh-E Muzical Doctorz	Jaani	Jassi Gill
2018	"Zindagi Mil Jayegi"	Tony Kakkar		
2018	“Yaad Piya Ki Aane Lagi”	Tanishk Bagchi	Tanishk Bagchi	Divya Khosla Kumar
2018	"Baarish"	Bilal Saeed		
2018	"Dil Chahiye"	Tony Kakkar		
2018	"Diliwaliye"	Bilal Saeed		
2018	"Makhna"	Yo Yo Honey Singh	Yo Yo Honey Singh, Singhsta, Hommie Dilliwala	Yo Yo Honey Singh, Singhsta, Pinaki, Sean, Allistair
2019	"Tera Ghata" (Remake)	Aditya Dev (originally composed by Gajendra Verma)	Gajendra Verma	
2019	"Kuch Kuch"	Tony Kakkar		
2019	"Sorry"	MixSingh, Maninder Buttar	Babbu	Maninder Buttar
2019	"Wah Wai Wahh"	Sukh-E Muzical Doctorz	Jaani	Sukh-E Muzical Doctorz
2019	"Puchda Hi Nahin"	MixSingh, Maninder Buttar	Babbu	
2020	"Superstar"	Aditya Dev, Sarmad Qadeer	Babbu, Sarmad Qadeer	Vibhor Parashar
2020	"Goa Beach"	Tony Kakkar		
2020	"Daily Daily"	Rajat Nagpal, Vicky Sandhu	Vicky Sandhu	
2020	"Nesha Nesha"	DJ AKS	Pradip Saha	Parvez Sazzad
2020	"Mere Angne Mein"	Tanishk Bagchi	Vayu	Raj Hasan
2020	"Kalla Sohna Nai"	Rajat Nagpal	Babbu	
2020	"Jinke Liye"	B Praak	Jaani	
2020	"Moscow Mashuka"	Yo Yo Honey Singh		
2020	"Bheegi Bheegi"	Tony Kakkar	Prince Dubey	Tony Kakkar
2020	"Diamond Da Challa"	Rajat Nagpal	Vicky Sandhu	Parmish Verma
2020	"Taaron Ke Shehar"	Jaani	Jaani	Jubin Nautiyal
2020	"Teri Aankhon Mein"	Manan Bhardwaj	Kumaar	Darshan Raval
2020	"Tashan-E-Ishq"	Sukh-E	Vishal Tickky	Jasmin Bhasin
2020	"Dil Ko Karaar Aaya"	Rajat Nagpal	Rana	Yasser Desai
2020	"Nehu Da Vyah"	Neha Kakkar	Neha Kakkar	Rohanpreet Singh
2020	"Om Jai Jagdish Hare"	Manan Bhardwaj		Tulsi Kumar, Dhvani Bhanushali, Parampara Thakur, Sachet Tandon, Guru Randhawa, Millind Gaba, Jubin Nautiyal
2020	"Ex Calling"	Enzo	Babbu	Rohanpreet Singh
2020	"Shona Shona"	Tony Kakkar		
2020	"Khyaal Rakhya Kar"	Rajat Nagpal	Babbu	
2021	"Gale Lagana Hai"	Tony Kakkar		
2021	"Saiyaan Ji"	Yo Yo Honey Singh	Yo Yo Honey Singh, Lil Golu, Hommie Dilliwala	Yo Yo Honey Singh
2021	"Aur Pyaar Karna Hai"	Sachet-Parampara	Sayeed Quadri	Guru Randhawa
2021	"Marjaneya"	Rajat Nagpal	Babbu	
2021	"Khad Tenu Main Dassa"	Rajat Nagpal	Kaptaan	Rohanpreet Singh
2021	"Dil Ko Karaar Aaya" Reprise Version	Rajat Nagpal	Rana	
2021	"2 Phone"	Rajat Nagpal	Kaptaan	
2021	"Kanta Laga"	Tony Kakkar	Tony Kakkar	Tony Kakkar, Yo Yo Honey Singh
2021	"Bol Kaffara Kya Hoga"	DJ Chetas	Asim Raza, Sameer Anjaan	Farhan Sabri
2021	"Do Gallan"	Rajat Nagpal	Garry Sandhu	Rohanpreet Singh
2022	"Mud Mud Ke"	Tony Kakkar		
2022	"Narazgi"	Sonal Pradhan		
2022	"La La La"	Rohanpreet Singh		
2022	"Kiss You"	Tony Kakkar		
2022	"Baarish Mein Tum"	Showkidd	Samay	Rohanpreet Singh
2022	"O Sajna"	Tanishk Bagchi	Jaani	
2022	"12 Ladke"	Tony Kakkar		
2023	"Gham Khushiyan"	Rohanpreet Singh	Rana Sotal	Arijit Singh
2023	"Massla"	Singhsta	Singhsta	Singhsta
2023	"Khoobsurat"	Rohanpreet Singh	Rana Sotal	Raghav Chaitanya
2023	"Balenciaga"	Tony Kakkar		Tony Kakkar, Tony Jr. & Priyanka Ahuja
2023	"Dil Bechara"	Neha Kakkar, Rohan Preet Singh	Neha Kakkar, Rohan Preet Singh	Rohanpreet Singh
2023	"Sawan Aa Gaya"	Rohanpreet Singh	Rohanpreet Singh, Samay	Rohanpreet Singh
2023	"Aan Milo Sajna"	Arko, Uttam Singh	Arko, Anand Bakshi	
2023	"Jamna Paar"	Tony Kakkar	Tony Kakkar	Tony Kakkar, Tony Jr.
2023	"Buhe Vich"	Rohan Preet Singh		
2023	"Gaadi Kaali"	Saga Sounds	Raees & Rohanpreet Singh	Rohanpreet Singh
2023	"Broken"	Neha Kakkar, Tony Jr.		Tony Jr.
2023	"Lolipop"	Tony Kakkar		
2024	"Saiyaan Dheere Dheere"	Tony Kakkar		Tony Kakkar & Tony Jr.
2024	"Sonchadi"	DigV	Lavraj, Kausar Munir & Swanand Kirkire	Kamla Devi & DigV
2024	"Hain Zaroori"	Tony Kakkar		Aman Bhatt
2024	"Learn To Love"	Shekhar Ravjiani	Rajat Arora	
2024	"Ve Haaniyaan –Female Version	Avvy Sra & Suyash Singh	Sagar	
2024	"Channa Di Yaariyan"	Amit Trivedi	Geet Sagar	Amit Trivedi
2024	"Aaye Haaye"	Karan Aujla, Jay Trak	Karan Aujla	Karan Aujla
2024	"Tera Mera Viah"	Rohanpreet Singh	Rohanpreet Singh & Raees	Rohanpreet Singh
2025	"Moon Calling"	Gur Sidhu	Kaptaan	Gur Sidhu
2025	"Hawa Banke"	Rajat Nagpal	Vicky Sandhu	Rito Riba
2025	"Ki Lagda"	MixSingh	Chandra Brar	Jayy Randhawa
2025	"Bas Tu Hove"	Rohanpreet Singh		
2025	"Jhim Jhim"	Rajat Nagpal, Ekdev Limu	Ekdev Limu, Rana Sotal	Ekdev Limu
2025	"Badmaash"	Tony Kakkar		
2025	"Tu Pyasa Hai	Tony Kakkar		
2025	"Coca Cola 2.0"	Tony Kakkar		Tony Kakkar & Tony Jr.
2025	"Candy Shop"	Tony Kakkar		Tony Kakkar
2026	"Mil Lena"	Junior, Tony Kakkar & Rohanpreet Singh		Tony Kakkar
2026	"Mera Suit"	Tony Kakkar		Tony Kakkar, Junior
2026	"Valeti Daaru"	IKKA		
2026	"Bezaf"	Charif Bennis & Rajat Nagpal	Saad Lamjarred, Charif Bennis & Rana Sotal	Saad Lamjarred
2026	"Passa Passa(Indian Version)"	Karl Wine & Tony Kakkar		
2026	"Fanda"	PARTYTONYT		
2026	"Nava Suit"	Rohanpreet Singh		
2026	"Pyari Behna"	Tony Kakkar		
2026	"Naa Pushde"	Deep Klair & Harsh Nussi		
2026	"Tera Boyfriend Kaunsa?"	Tony Kakkar		Tony Kakkar & Junior

== Bangladeshi film songs ==
=== 2015 ===
Film	Song	Composer(s)	Writer(s)	Co-singer(s)
Agnee 2	Magic Mamoni	Savvy Gupta	Savvy Gupta	
