= Simmba (soundtrack) =

Soundtrack album by Tanishk Bagchi, Lijo George–DJ Chetas and S. Thaman
- Released: 27 December 2018
- Recorded: 2018
- Genre: Feature film soundtrack
- Length: 23:05
- Language: Hindi
- Label: T-Series
External audio
- Audio Jukebox on YouTube

Tanishk Bagchi chronology
| Zero (2018) | Simmba (2018) | Fraud Saiyaan (2019) |

Lijo George–DJ Chetas chronology
| Loveyatri (2018) | Simmba (2018) | Good Newwz (2019) |

S. Thaman chronology
| Orange (2018) | Simmba (2018) | Mr. Majnu (2019) |

Simmba is the soundtrack to the 2018 action comedy film of the same name directed by Rohit Shetty, which serves as the third instalment in Shetty's Cop Universe starring Ranveer Singh, Sonu Sood and Sara Ali Khan. The soundtrack featured five original songs and two instrumentals, composed by Tanishk Bagchi, Lijo George–DJ Chetas and S. Thaman, with lyrics written by Shabbir Ahmed, Rashmi Virag, Kumaar and Kunaal Vermaa. The soundtrack was released through T-Series on 27 December 2018.

== Development ==
Simmba is the maiden collaboration between Bagchi and Shetty. Bagchi, who had composed music for several films under Dharma Productions, was recommended by Johar to Shetty. The makers asked Bagchi to compose the title track "Aala Re Aala" which the crew immediately liked it. Later, he was offered to remake the song "Aankh Maare", originally composed by Viju Shah, written by Anand Bakshi and sung by Kumar Sanu and Kavita Krishnamurthy for the film Tere Mere Sapne (1996). Bagchi, with the music supervisor Azeem Dayani, had created five versions of the song, but did not like them as it missed the quirkiness they intended. He then composed a new middle section, which utilized Tusshar Kapoor's Golmaal voice and retained few lines from the original song, with Sanu to be a part of the remix as well. Arshad Warsi, who starred in the original film where the song is picturized upon and with whom he collaborated with Shetty in the Golmaal franchise, makes a cameo appearance in the song.

Bagchi recreated the qawwali song "Tere Bin Nahin Lagda" (1996) composed and performed by Nusrat Fateh Ali Khan, with the recreation being performed by his nephew Rahat Fateh Ali Khan and Asees Kaur. This was the second time the song being recreated, the first is for the film Kachche Dhaage (1999) where the song was recreated as "Tere Bin Nahin Jeena" and is sung by Lata Mangeshkar. Bagchi composed a new mukhda for the song with lyrics by Rashmi Virag. Lijo George–DJ Chetas composed the dance number "Mera Waala Dance" which featured Singh and Ajay Devgan reprising his role as Bajirao Singham from the Singham franchise. S. Thaman, who previously composed the title track for Shetty's Golmaal Again (2017) had composed the score with Amar Mohile and Chandan Saxena. Thaman's rendition of the theme music is included in the soundtrack.

== Release ==
The song "Aankh Maarey" was released as a music video was released as a single on 6 December 2018. Within six months of its release, the song garnered around 1 billion views. The second single "Tere Bin" was released on 14 December. The title track "Aala Re Aala" was released as the third song on 20 December. The fourth song "Mera Wala Dance" was released on 26 December. The soundtrack album was released by T-Series on 27 December, a day before the film's release.

== Reception ==
Debarat S Sen of The Times of India wrote "Usually, remixes are not considered to be better than originals, but Tanishk's work in this album might just make you rethink about that." Joginder Tuteja of Bollywood Hungama wrote "Music of Simmba is better than what one expected from it. Other than situational songs (most of which work), the soundtrack also boasts of songs like 'Aankh Marey' and 'Mere Wala Dance' which have it in them to cover a much larger distance."

== Track listing ==
| No. | Title | Lyrics | Music | Singer(s) | Length |
|---|---|---|---|---|---|
| 1. | "Aankh Maarey" | Shabbir Ahmed | Tanishk Bagchi | Mika Singh, Neha Kakkar, Kumar Sanu | 03:33 |
| 2. | "Tere Bin" | Rashmi Virag | Tanishk Bagchi | Rahat Fateh Ali Khan, Asees Kaur, Tanishk Bagchi | 03:51 |
| 3. | "Aala Re Aala" | Shabbir Ahmed | Tanishk Bagchi | Dev Negi, Goldie | 03:20 |
| 4. | "Mera Wala Dance" | Kumaar, Kunaal Vermaa | Lijo George–DJ Chetas | Neha Kakkar, Nakash Aziz | 03:20 |
| 5. | "Bandeya Re Bandeya" | Rashmi Virag | Tanishk Bagchi | Arijit Singh, Asees Kaur | 04:15 |
| 6. | "Simmba Theme 1" (Instrumental) | — | Tanishk Bagchi | — | 02:06 |
| 7. | "Simmba Theme 2" (Instrumental) | — | S. Thaman | — | 02:40 |
| Total length: | | | | | 23:05 |

== Awards and nominations ==
| Award | Date of ceremony (Note: Each date is linked to the article about the awards held that year, wherever possible.) | Category | Recipient(s) | Result | Ref. |
|---|---|---|---|---|---|
| Mirchi Music Awards | 16 February 2019 | Recreated Song of the Year | "Aankh Maarey" | Nominated | |
| Mirchi Music Awards | 16 February 2019 | Recreated Song of the Year | "Tere Bin" | Nominated | |
| Nickelodeon Kids' Choice Awards India | 9 August 2019 | Favorite Bollywood Movie Song | "Aankh Maarey" | Won | |
| Zee Cine Awards | 19 March 2019 | Best Playback Singer – Female | Neha Kakkar for "Aankh Maarey" | Nominated | |
| Zee Cine Awards | 19 March 2019 | Best Track of the Year | "Aankh Maarey" | Won | |
