= Raabta =

Raabta (lit. 'relation') may refer to:

- Raabta (film), a 2017 Indian Hindi film
- "Raabta" (song), a song from the album of the 2012 Indian Hindi film, Agent Vinod
