= Pati Patni Aur Woh Do =

2026 Indian film by Mudassar Aziz

- Theatrical release poster
- Directed by: Mudassar Aziz
- Written by: Mudassar Aziz
- Screenplay by: Ravi Kumar; Mudassar Aziz
- Produced by: Bhushan Kumar; Renu Ravi Chopra; Krishan Kumar
- Starring: Ayushmann Khurrana; Sara Ali Khan; Wamiqa Gabbi; Rakul Preet Singh
- Cinematography: Jishnu Bhattacharjee
- Edited by: Ninad Khanolkar
- Music by: Songs: Rajesh Roshan; Rochak Kohli; Tanishk Bagchi; Neelkamal Singh; Tony Kakkar; Badshah; Devv Sadaana; Score: Ketan Sodha
- Production companies: T-Series Films; B. R. Studios
- Distributed by: Zee Studios
- Release date: 15 May 2026
- Running time: 117 minutes
- Country: India
- Language: Hindi
- Box office: est. ₹64.06 crore

Pati Patni Aur Woh Do (transl. 'Husband, wife and the other two') is a 2026 Indian Hindi-language romantic comedy film written and directed by Mudassar Aziz. Produced by Bhushan Kumar and Renu Ravi Chopra under T-Series Films and B. R. Studios, it is a spiritual sequel to the 2019 film Pati Patni Aur Woh. The film features a new ensemble cast consisting of Ayushmann Khurrana, Wamiqa Gabbi, Sara Ali Khan and Rakul Preet Singh.

The film theatrically released on 15 May 2026 to mixed reviews from critics.

== Plot ==
Prajapati aka Praja is a forest department official, who lives in Prayagraj with his wife, Aparna. Praja's life gets thrown into chaos when Aparna reports that politician Gajraj Tiwari's son, Sunny, is dating a Muslim, after photographs showed Sunny with someone in a hijab. The report causes a mini-scandal in Benaras, and Gajraj and Aparna both aggressively look for the girl's identity. Unknown to Aparna, Sunny's lover is Chanchal, an acquaintance of Praja from Benaras. Chanchal wore a hijab to hide her identity from goons. Praja agrees to help after realising Aparna's report caused this mess.

Praja lies to Aparna about being in Kanpur for work, then shows up with Chanchal at public places in Benaras. Gajraj's goons photograph them together, but keep following them as they are unconvinced the two are a real couple. Frustrated, Chanchal forces Praja to check them into a cheap hotel posing as lovers. The hotel is raided by local police, and everyone with fake identities is arrested. In Prayag, Nilofer receives a distress call from Praja, asking to bail him out. Nilofer is Praja's colleague and Aparna's friend. She bails out Praja, but promises to inform Aparna about his 'infidelity'. Praja desperately pursues Nilofer to explain his version of events, but is seen in the process by Aparna, who is in Benaras looking for clues about Sunny's lover. Aparna becomes convinced that Praja is cheating on her.

Back home, Praja is tasked with an assignment to capture a wild wolf in Benaras. He visits with Nilofer and his team, and makes one final public appearance with Chanchal. At a family wedding, he announces their engagement, leading to joy from Chanchal's family. The news reaches Sunny, who starts doubting Chanchal's intentions. He kidnaps Praja to interrogate him, but is caught in a compromising situation with him, leading Gajraj's goons to assume that both are gay. They report this to Gajraj, who sees his political ambitions slip away if the news becomes public. Gajraj is now convinced that Praja was the secret 'hijab-wearing girl'.

The next day, Praja, Chanchal, Aparna and Nilofer are held captive at Gajraj's farmhouse, while he tries to contact Sunny. Sunny is actually at the airport, waiting to elope with Chanchal as planned. Seeing that they are adjacent to a forest, Praja starts making wild mating calls. The rogue wolf appears out of nowhere, followed by Praja's team of handlers tasked with its capture. Pandemonium ensues, and Praja manages to escape with Chanchal to the airport. Gajraj arrives to stop Sunny from leaving, but relents after Praja threatens to damage his reputation. Chanchal thanks Praja for reuniting lovers, while Aparna apologises for doubting him of adultery.

== Cast ==
- Ayushmann Khurrana as Prajapati Pandey
- Sara Ali Khan as Chanchal Kumari, Sunny's love interest and Praja's friend
- Wamiqa Gabbi as Aparna Trivedi, Prajapati's wife
- Rakul Preet Singh as Nilofer Khan, Praja and Aparna's friend
- Vijay Raaz as Dharamveer Singh
- Tigmanshu Dhulia as Gajraj Tiwari
- Vishal Vashishtha as Sudhanshu "Sunny" Tiwari
- Guneet Singh Sodhi as Surinder
- Durgesh Kumar as Mahinder
- Ayesha Raza Mishra as Bua Ji
- Shireesh Kumar Sharma as Ashok Trivedi
- Deepika Amin as Bhavna Trivedi
- Santanu Panda as MOYO hotel receptionist
- Rajveer Singh as Mahesh Nigam, forest officer

== Production ==
=== Development ===
In late 2021, T-Series and B.R. Studios announced a sequel to the 2019 Pati Patni Aur Woh. The producers decided to reboot the storyline of the previous movie with a new cast led by Ayushmann Khurrana. Director Mudassar Aziz returned to helm the project.

=== Filming ===
Principal photography began on August 2025 and it took place entirely in Prayagraj. Production faced a brief disruption in late August 2025 due to a clash between the film's crew and local residents during an outdoor shoot. Filming was completed on September 2025.

== Soundtrack ==
Pati Patni Aur Woh Do

Soundtrack album by Rajesh Roshan, Rochak Kohli, Tanishk Bagchi, Neelkamal Singh, Tony Kakkar, Badshah and Dev Sadaana
- Released: 14 May 2026
- Genre: Feature film soundtrack
- Length: 27:43
- Language: Hindi
- Label: T-Series

Official audio
- Pati Patni Aur Woh Do – Full Album on YouTube

The film's soundtrack is composed by Rajesh Roshan, Rochak Kohli, Tanishk Bagchi, Neelkamal Singh, Tony Kakkar, Badshah and Dev Sadaana with lyrics written by Indeevar, Kumaar, Kunaal Vermaa, Badshah, Neelkamal Singh and Arslan Nizami. The first song, "Roop Di Rani", was a remake of the song "Kali Teri Choti Hai Paranda" from the 1990 film Bahaar Aane Tak sung by Anuradha Paudwal and Mangal Singh composed by Rajesh Roshan and written by Indeevar released on 22 April 2026. The second song, "Dil Waale Chor", was released on 25 April 2026. The third song, a recreation of Devv Sadaana's "Dil Lagana Mana Tha" was released as "Humne Wahin Lagaya Dil" on 6 May 2026. The fourth song, "Angdayi" was released on 9 May 2026.

Track listing
No.	Title	Lyrics	Music	Singer(s)	Length
1.	"Roop Di Rani"	Indeevar	Rajesh Roshan, Tanishk Bagchi	Guru Randhawa, Heer	3:39
2.	"Dil Waale Chor"	Kumaar	Rochak Kohli	Aditya Rikhari, Shreya Ghoshal	3:04
3.	"Humne Wahin Lagaya Dil"	Badshah, Kunaal Verma	Badshah, Hiten, Dev Sadaana	Badshah, Krish Mondal, Kishore Mondal, Ipsitaa	2:39
4.	"Angdayi"	Faheem Abdullah, Arshad Nizami	Tanishk Bagchi, Faheem Abdullah, Arshad Nizami	Faheem Abdullah, Arshad Nizami, Zahrah S. Khan	2:31
5.	"Dil Waale Chor -Reprise"	Ayushmann Khurrana, Kumaar	Rochak Kohli	Ayushmann Khurrana	2:13
6.	"Dheeme Dheeme 2.0"	Ashutosh Tiwari, Tony Kakkar	Nilkamal Singh, Lijo George, Tony Kakkar	Neelkamal Singh, Shiva Chaudhary, Tony Kakkar	3:30
7.	"Dum Duma Dum (Reboot)"	Sameer	Anand-Milind	Udit Narayan, Anuradha Paudwal	2:43
8.	"Pyar Mein Kyun Hota Hai"	Sameer	Himesh Reshammiya	Udit Narayan	2:14
9.	"Pyar Karke Pachtaye"	Mayur Puri	Pritam	Labh Janjua	2:22
10.	"Jeena Nahin Mujhe"	Javed Akhtar	Laxmikant-Pyarelal	Amit Kumar, Anuradha Paudwal	2:48
Total length:					27:43

== Release ==
The film was originally slated for a release on 4 March 2026, coinciding with the Holi festival. The film release was postponed to 15 May 2026 to avoid a crowded March release window as well as production delays.

== Reception ==
On the review aggregator website Rotten Tomatoes, 17% of 12 critics' reviews are positive, with an average rating of 5/10.

Shalini Langer writing for The Indian Express gave 1.5 stars out of 5 and said that the film "clothes it all in a modernity that can conceive women in jobs, women in open relationships, but not women whose life doesn't revolve around a man." Rahul Desai of The Hollywood Reporter India describe it as "Too unfunny to be offensive". Rishabh Suri of Hindustan Times gave 3.5 stars and said that the film "excels with a sharp script and strong performances." Anuj Kumar of The Hindu observed that Khurrana "anchors a farcical marital comedy that throws everything at the wall." Vineeta Kumar of India Today gave 3 stars out of 5 and writes that the film "stays light and crowd-pleasing and avoids saying anything deeper - a clean, breezy entertainer."

Nandini Ramnath of Scroll.in writes in her review that the film manages to smuggle in "the occasional barb at prejudice and pettiness. The skewering of biases based on caste, religion or sexuality, although less radical than it appears, is more entertaining than watching humans squawk and scamper about like chickens." Vinamra Mathur of Firstpost rated it 2/5 stars and said that "It is not a film about infidelity, but it is not a comedy of errors either. It almost comes close to becoming a comedy of terrors." Devesh Sharma of Filmfare gave it 3 stars out 5 and said that "At its best, Pati Patni Aur Woh Do has flashes of the lively middle-class farce it aspires to become. But the screenplay remains too scattered, the tonal shifts too abrupt and the humour too inconsistent for the film to fully land." Bollywood Hungama rated it 3/5 stars and said that "On the whole, Pati Patni Aur Woh Do is a decent commercial entertainer that works due to its plot and maddening climax."
