= Creature 3D =

2014 Hindi film by Vikram Bhatt

- Theatrical release poster
- Directed by: Vikram Bhatt
- Written by: Girish Dhamija (Dialogue)
- Screenplay by: Vikram Bhatt; Sukhmani Sadana
- Story by: Vikram Bhatt
- Produced by: Bhushan Kumar; Krishan Kumar
- Starring: Bipasha Basu; Imran Abbas
- Cinematography: Pravin Bhatt; 3D Stereographer; Michael Flax
- Edited by: Kuldip Mehan
- Music by: (Songs); Mithoon; Tony Kakkar; (Score); Raju Rao
- Production company: T-Series Films
- Release date: 12 September 2014
- Running time: 134 minutes
- Country: India
- Language: Hindi
- Budget: ₹25 crore (US$2.6 million)
- Box office: ₹20.6 crore (US$2.1 million)

Creature 3D is a 2014 Indian Hindi-language 3D monster horror film directed by Vikram Bhatt. It is produced by Bhushan Kumar and Krishan Kumar and co-produced by Ajay Kapoor under the banner of T-Series in association with BVG Films. It stars Bipasha Basu in her penultimate film before her long hiatus and Pakistani actor Imran Abbas, marking the latter's Bollywood debut. The film also stars Mukul Dev and Deepraj Rana in supporting roles.

The film was released theatrically on 12 September 2014.

== Plot ==
Ahana opens a hotel in Himachal Pradesh . She requires manpower, furniture, and various other items for her hotel. She talks to a driver to transport the items quickly. However, the driver is stuck in the middle of the forest, and his truck is damaged. During the conversation, the driver hears strange noises coming from the surrounding area. Upon investigating, he sees a monster and runs back to the truck, locking himself in the back. The monster lands on the roof of the truck and tears it open. It attacks the driver and kills him.

On the day of the opening party, Ahana meets Kunal Anand, a novelist, and are attracted to each other. One day, a chef of Ahana's hotel is killed by that beast. A newly married couple staying in Ahana's hotel go for a picnic in the forest, and the man is killed by the monster while his wife gets severely injured and later recovered by authorities. Similar incidents then follow in which other people die. The chief suspect of the incidents is believed to be an animal, leading to the capture of a leopard. Ahana is relieved as a result, though it turns out that it was not the creature, and she doesn't know that the creature was responsible for it. One particular night, the beast enters Ahana's hotel. Upon seeing the behemoth, the people inside the hotel panic and run away, but the beast manages to kill and injure several people. Just when it was about to kill Ahana, Kunal managed to save her, but the beast managed to get hold of them. Just about to make its final move, a scientist entered the scene and scared away the monster with fire. The people realize that it is scared of fire and is, in fact, a Brahmarakshasa. Due to the havoc caused by it, Ahana’s hotel loses its reputation and almost goes out of business.

There are few customers in Ahana's hotel, and she is on the verge of going bankrupt, which will result in the bank seizing the hotel. They meet a scientist, who reveals that it is a Brahmarakshasa, a man-eating demonic entity conceived through the corruption of Brahmins upon death. He informs them that such demons still lurk in dense forests of India, but their sightings are presumed to be sightings of UFOs. He suggests Ahana and Kunal leave if they wish to stay alive. Ahana refuses to leave the hotel, determined to fight back.

Ahana, Kunal, and the professor are joined in the fight by two cops, Inspector Rana and Inspector Chaubey, but the creature soon kills Chaubey. They learn that a Sarpanch filed a report of a monster sighting a few years back and go to meet him. He tells them that decades ago, a hunter killed a creature just like the one they encountered. He also informs them that the only person who can help them now is Dr. Moga, the son of the late hunter. Kunal and Ahana set for Shimla to meet him. On the way, Kunal reveals his true identity as Karan Malhotra, the chairman of the builder group that compelled Ahana's father to commit suicide. He tells her that he felt guilty and wanted to apologize. Heartbroken, Ahana breaks up with Karan.

Dr. Moga explains that the creature can be killed by a weapon dipped in the temple pond of the Brahma Temple, Pushkar but is effective only if dipped into the pond on the night of Kartika Purnima. Since Kartika Purnima is many days away, Dr. Moga gives Ahana an old rifle with which his father had killed one of the creatures. Dr. Moga tells Ahana that his father and his friends dipped 30 bullets in the pond on the night of Kartik Purnima, but they used up 23 bullets, and still all the friends of his father died and only his father was left. He then hands over the left seven bullets to Ahana. Ahana, the professor, and Rana enter the den of the behemoth; Rana and the professor are killed by the beast, and when it tries to attack Ahana, Karan saves her. With Karan's help, Ahana manages to kill the creature with the last bullet in the rifle.

A few days later, the hotel is ready to be reopened. Ahana forgives Karan, and they rekindle their relationship.

== Cast ==
- Bipasha Basu as Ahana Dutt
- Imran Abbas as Kunal Anand/Karan Malhotra
- Mukul Dev as Professor Sadana
- Deepraj Rana as Inspector Rana
- Mohan Kapoor as Doctor Moga
- Vineet Sharma as father of Ahana
- Natasha Rana as Psychiatrist
- Amit Tandon as Arjun
- Aparna Bajpai as Shurti
- Siraj Mustafa Khan as Hunter, a friend of Karan
- Bikramjeet Kanwarpal as Inspector Chaubey
- Vikram Bhatt as voice of Creature.
- Rajshri Rani Pandey as Ritu (Karan's Assistant)
- Ashutosh Rana as hotel visiter
- Rajneesh Duggal as Himself Special appearance in song “Mohabbat Barsa De"
- Surveen Chawla as Herself Special appearance in song "Mohabbat Barsa De"

== Music ==
Creature 3D

Soundtrack album by Mithoon, Tony Kakkar
- Released: 31 July 2014
- Genre: Feature film soundtrack
- Length: 25:09
- Language: Hindi
- Label: T-Series
External audio
- Audio Jukebox on YouTube

The soundtrack and the lyrics of the film were written by Mithoon, except for "Sawan Aaya Hai" which has music and lyrics by Tony Kakkar. and sung by Arijit Singh. The film's soundtrack officially released on 31 July 2014. Koimoi stated that the soundtrack had received a good reception.

All music is composed by Mithoon, Tony Kakkar.

Creature 3D Soundtrack
No.	Title	Lyrics	Music	Singer(s)	Length
1.	"Sawan Aaya Hai"	Tony Kakkar	Tony Kakkar	Arijit Singh	4:48
2.	"Hum Na Rahein Hum"	Mithoon	Mithoon	Benny Dayal	5:23
3.	"Naam-E-Wafa"	Mithoon	Mithoon	Farhan Saeed, Tulsi Kumar	5:14
4.	"Ik Pal Yahi"	Mithoon	Mithoon	Mithoon, Saim Bhat	5:45
5.	"Mehboob Ki"	Mithoon	Mithoon	Mithoon	4:36
6.	"Sawan Aaya Hai" (Unplugged)	Tony Kakkar	Tony Kakka	Tony Kakkar	4:11
7.	"Hum Naa Rahein Hum" (Remix by DJ Notorious)	Mithoon	Mithoon	Benny Dayal	04:19
8.	"Naam-E-Wafa" (Remix by DJ Angel)	Mithoon	Mithoon	Farhan Saeed, Tulsi Kumar	04:24
9.	"Sawan Aaya Hai" (Remix by DJ Shiva)	Tony Kakkar	Tony Kakkar	Arijit Singh	04:20
10.	"Mohabbat Barsa De"	Tony Kakkar, Arjun	Tony Kakkar	Arijit Singh, Arjun & Samira Koppikar	04:34
Total length:					30:22

== Reception ==
Vinayak Chakravorty of India Today gave 2 stars out of 5 to the movie stating that it suffered from budget constraints, and "serves little intrigue and banks on the sporadic jolts courtesy (of the) loud music." Anupama Chopra of Film Companion rated the film 1.5 stars out of 5 and wrote, "This is the type of film in which the human beings are so annoying that you are actually rooting for the creature that kills them. Basu plays Ahana, the owner of a boutique hotel while Karan a hotel guest and Ahana's admirer played by the totally forgettable actor Imran Abbas. In fact, the creature had more personality than all of them put together. In an effective opening sequence, Vikram introduces him to us by only showing us isolated parts; his talons, monstrous eyes, powerful tail. I think this Creature should have demanded a better script."

== Box-office ==
India Today reports that the film had a budget of Rs.180 million with an additional Rs.70 million spent on a marketing campaign. Box Office India called the film a "box office failure".

== Awards ==
Award	Category	Recipients	Result
Filmfare Awards	Best male Debut	Imraan Abbas	Nominated
