= Sawan Aaya Hai =

Song performed by Arijit Singh

- Cover of the song, featuring actors Bipasha Basu, Imran Abbas Naqvi.

Single by Arijit Singh

from the album Creature 3D
- Released: 31 July 2014
- Genre: Filmi
- Length: 4:48
- Label: T-Series
- Songwriter: Tony Kakkar

Creature 3D track listing
- 1. "Sawan Aaya Hai"; 2. "Hum Naa Rahein Hum"; 3. "Naam-E-Wafa"; 4. "Ik Pal Yahi"; 5. "Mehboob Ki"; 6. "Sawan Aaya Hai" (Unplugged); 7. "Hum Naa Rahein Hum" (Remix); 8. "Naam-E-Wafa" (Remix); 9. "Sawan Aaya Hai" (Remix)

Music video
- "Sawan Aaya Hai" on YouTube

"Sawan Aaya Hai" (transl. Monsoon has arrived) is a romantic song from the 2014 Hindi film Creature 3D. Composed and written by Tony Kakkar, the song is sung by Arijit Singh. The music video of the track features actors Bipasha Basu and Imran Abbas Naqvi. The official music video has 169 Million views on YouTube as of March 2025.

== Background and release ==
The song is composed and written by Tony Kakkar. He initially worked with Pooja Bhatt, where he recorded a few songs for one of her films, which got delayed and shelved. She later recommended him for the producer of the film, Bhushan Kumar, where he offered him to compose a song for the film. The video of the song was used in the end credits of the film. The song is picturised on Bipasha Basu and Imran Abbas Naqvi, marking the debut Bollywood appearance of Abbas, who had earlier worked in Pakistani cinema.

The music video of the track was officially released through the YouTube channel of T-Series on 30 July 2014. The song was the first track released from the film. The full song was released digitally on 31 July 2014 as a single. It was included in the soundtrack of the album which was released on 8 August 2014. The soundtrack also contains an unplugged version of the song sung by Kakkar, and a remix version of the original song by DJ Shiva.

== Critical reception ==
=== Original version ===
Kasmin Fernandes of The Times of India felt that "Singh does a commendable job" in the vocals. Writing for Rediff.com, Joginder Tuteja thought its "melody, lovelorn lyrics" and "quintessential" vocals by Singh make it an instantly catchy song. Apart from the positive response from the critics, the song received some negative reviews. Surabhi Redkar from Koimoi calling the composition by Tony Kakkar "quite repetitive", stated; "supposed to be a romantic number, the song fails to create any impact". He also panned the remix version of the song calling it "completely unnecessary".

=== Unplugged version ===
Surabhi Redkar from Koimoi reacted positively to the version, calling the song "decent number" stated; "This version being an unplugged one is a much more mellow than the original".

Kasmin Fernandes of The Times of India reacted in a mixed way to the song; "Music director Kakkar comes on board as singer on the unplugged version of Sawan Aaya Hai, which sounds better thanks to the acoustic guitar and flute, but could have done without Kakkar's nasal twang".

== Promotional version ==
In 2014, a promotional cover version of "Sawan Aaya Hai", recreated by Arko was released. Titled "Mohabbat Barsa De", the song uses the additional vocals by Arjun and Samira Koppikar while the vocals by Arijit Singh–sung the original version of the song–was retained. The version of the song feature actors, Rajniesh Duggall, Surveen Chawla and Arjun. The version was released on 2 September 2014, 11 days before the release of the film.

=== Background ===
The song was shot in a Mumbai studio within two days. The version of the song was picturised on Rajniesh Duggall and Surveen Chawla. The video of the song is directed by Ajay Kumar and Sanjukta Kumar.

The song is sung by Arjun, Arijit Singh and Samira Koppikar. Additional English lines were included in the version which was written by Arjun. The song marks the third time Arjun covered a version sung by Singh, the first being "Tum Hi Ho" followed by "Kabhi Jo Baadal Barse".

== Track listing and formats ==
- Digital single
1. "Sawan Aaya Hai" – 4:48
- Original Motion Picture Soundtrack
1. "Sawan Aaya Hai" – 4:48
2. "Sawan Aaya Hai" (Unplugged) – 4:11
3. "Sawan Aaya Hai" (Remix) – 4:20
4. "Mohabbat Barsa De" – 4:36
5. "Saawan Aaya Hai" By Tony Kakkar
