= Dheeme Dheeme (song) =

Tony Kakkar & Neha Kakkar

"Dheeme Dheeme Ft.Tony Kakkar, Neha Kakkar"

Single by Tony Kakkar
- Language: Hindi
- English title: Slowly, slowly
- Released: 8 May 2019
- Genre: Indian pop
- Length: 2:42
- Label: Desi Music Factory
- Songwriter: Tony Kakkar
- Producer: Tony Kakkar

Music video
- "Dheeme Dheeme" on YouTube

"Dheeme Dheeme" (transl. Slowly Slowly) is a Hindi romantic song by Tony Kakkar, released as a single by Desi Music Factory on 8 May 2019 via YouTube and online music streaming services.

== Background ==
The song was composed and written by Tony Kakkar, and was released under the label Desi Music Factory. Music video of this song was produced by Anshul Garg, co-produced by Raghav Sharma and directed by Parth Gupta & Gurdas. The video features actress-model Neha Sharma. The song and its music video was released on 8 May 2019.

== Reception ==
Music video has 548 million views on YouTube as of November 2020.

== Personnel ==
- Song: "Dheeme Dheeme"
- Artist: Tony Kakkar
- Starring: Tony Kakkar ft. Neha Sharma
- Music, Lyrics & Composition: Tony Kakkar
- Producer: Anshul Garg
- Co-Producer: Raghav Sharma
- Director: Parth Gupta & Gurdas
- DOP: Sukh Kambooj
- Production: Aman Production
- Label: Desi Music Factory

=== Note ===
- All credits for the personnel can be found on the description of the song's official music video on YouTube.

== Remake ==
"Dheeme Dheeme Ft. Tony Kakkar, Neha Kakkar"

Song by Tony Kakkar, Neha Kakkar & Tanishk Bagchi

from the album Pati Patni Aur Woh
- Language: Hindi
- English title: Slowly, slowly
- Released: 10 November 2019
- Genre: Indian pop
- Length: 2:26
- Label: T-Series
- Songwriters: Tony Kakkar; Tanishk Bagchi; Mellow D
- Producers: Bhushan Kumar; Renu Ravi Chopra; Krishan Kumar

Music video
- "Dheeme Dheeme" on YouTube

A remake version of this song was used in the 2019 film Pati, Patni Aur Woh starring Kartik Aaryan, Bhumi Pednekar, and Ananya Panday. The song was recreated by Tanishk Bagchi with a dance club beat, with Kakkar once again singing the song, with additional vocals by Neha Kakkar.
