= Pati Patni Aur Woh (2019 film) =

2019 Indian film by Mudassar Aziz

- Theatrical release poster
- Directed by: Mudassar Aziz
- Written by: Mudassar Aziz
- Story by: Kamleshwar
- Based on: Pati Patni Aur Woh by B. R. Chopra and Kamleshwar
- Produced by: Bhushan Kumar; Renu Ravi Chopra; Juno Chopra; Krishan Kumar
- Starring: Kartik Aaryan; Bhumi Pednekar; Ananya Panday
- Narrated by: Jimmy Shergill
- Cinematography: Chirantan Das
- Edited by: Ninad Khanolkar
- Music by: Score: John Stewart Eduri; Songs: Tanishk Bagchi; Rochak Kohli; Sachet–Parampara; Tony Kakkar; Lijo George-DJ Chetas
- Production companies: T-Series; B. R. Studios
- Distributed by: AA Films
- Release date: 6 December 2019
- Running time: 126 minutes
- Country: India
- Language: Hindi
- Budget: ₹450 million
- Box office: ₹1.18 billion

Pati Patni Aur Woh (transl. 'Husband, wife and her') is a 2019 Indian Hindi-language romantic comedy film written and directed by Mudassar Aziz. A remake of the 1978 film of the same name, the film stars Kartik Aaryan, Bhumi Pednekar, and Ananya Panday.

Principal photography commenced in February 2019 and ended in September. The film was released on 6 December 2019 and emerged as a commercial success with a worldwide gross of ₹118 crore (US$12 million).

A spiritual sequel titled Pati Patni Aur Woh Do directed by Aziz and starring Ayushmann Khurrana, Wamiqa Gabbi, Sara Ali Khan and Rakul Preet Singh was released in May 2026.

== Plot ==
Abhinav "Chintu" Kumar Tyagi is an ordinary middle-class man from Kanpur, and a government engineer in the Public Works Department (PWD). He has been married to Vedika Tripathi, a teacher from Lucknow. Chintu is happy but is troubled by his controlling parents for not planning a child, and by Vedika, who wants to move to a big city.

Pressured and bored in his day-to-day life, Chintu finds comfort in Tapasya Singh, an aspiring fashion designer from Delhi, who is related to his boss and came to select a plot for starting her fashion business. Chintu finds himself drawn towards her and decides to enjoy his life. He lies to her that Vedika is having an affair with Rakesh Yadav, who is actually a student in her class and is besotted with her.

Chintu goes on dates with Tapasya, and though he tries to avoid Vedika, she finally sees the two of them together one day. She keeps this to herself and listens as he lies to her. Vedika attends her cousin Kanupriya's wedding, where she meets her ex-boyfriend Durgesh "Doga" Kanojia, a local womanizer whom she had left for Chintu. The two resolve to leave the country and shift to Canada. Meanwhile, Chintu goes to Tapasya's home in Delhi and meets her friends. They go to a nightclub and party; she seduces a drunken Chintu and is ready to kiss him, but Chintu is held by his conscience.

Chintu realises he has wronged Vedika, but it is too late, as she tells him she is leaving him and knows of his infidelity. Chintu realises how much he loves her. Distraught, he visits Vedika's parents with his best friend Fahim, but her parents give them her letter, wherein she states that she is eloping with Doga. At Doga's travel agency, Chintu and Fahim are roughed up by Doga's henchmen. When he visits Tapasya at her home and warns her that she cannot take Vedika's place, she asks him why he chooses to remain unhappy when she is there for him. Working himself up in a fit of rage while drunk, he smashes Doga's shop and is arrested, but Fahim pays for his bail.

One morning, Rakesh arrives with Fahim to find a depressed Chintu at home and informs him that Vedika is departing for Canada for good. The three rush to the Lucknow Airport, with Chintu's family and police in hot pursuit. At the airport, Chintu finds Vedika, Tapasya, and Doga. Tapasya spares him, saying that she will not slap him, no matter how much she wants to, because he did not get intimate with her while in Delhi. He finds out that it is Doga who is going to Canada and that this was Doga's plan to make him realise Vedika's worth. Vedika forgives him and they reconcile.

Eventually, another girl, Neha Khanna, enters his office; he initially stares at her but restrains himself. As she goes out the door, he calls out her name while she calls him a 'weirdo' to herself.

== Cast ==
- Kartik Aaryan as Er. Abhinav Arvind "Chintu" Kumar Tyagi
- Bhumi Pednekar as Vedika "Guddi" Tripathi
- Ananya Panday as Tapasya Singh
- Aparshakti Khurana as Er. Fahim Abdul Rizvi
- K. K. Raina as Professor Arvind Kumar “Hitler” Tyagi
- Rajesh Sharma as Prem Tripathi
- Navni Parihar as Kusum Tyagi
- Geeta Agarwal Sharma as Hemlata Tripathi
- Neeraj Sood as Brijesh Raj (B. R.) Pandey / "Mausaji"
- Sunny Singh as Durgesh "Doga" Kanojia
- Shubham Kumar as Rakesh Yadav
- Manu Rishi Chaddha as Inspector Mukhtar Singh, Lucknow Police
- Kriti Sanon as Neha Khanna (Special appearance)

== Soundtrack ==
Pati Patni Aur Woh

Soundtrack album by Tanishk Bagchi, Rochak Kohli, Sachet–Parampara, Tony Kakkar and Lijo George – DJ Chetas
- Released: 29 November 2019
- Recorded: 2019
- Genre: Feature film soundtrack
- Length: 21:36
- Language: Hindi
- Label: T-Series
External audio
- Official Audio Jukebox on YouTube

The music is composed by Tanishk Bagchi, Rochak Kohli, Sachet–Parampara, Tony Kakkar and Lijo George – DJ Chetas with, lyrics written by Kumaar, Mellow D, Tony Kakkar, Tanishk Bagchi, Navi Ferozpurwala and Shabbir Ahmed.

Tony Kakkar's song "Dheeme Dheeme", originally released in May 2019, was recreated by Tanishk Bagchi with a party beat and additional vocals from his sister, Neha Kakkar.

The second song "Ankhiyon Se Goli Maare" from the film Dulhe Raja, originally sung by popular singers Sonu Nigam and Jaspinder Narula, composed by Anand–Milind and written by Sameer Anjaan was recreated for the film twice – once by Tanishk Bagchi and then by DJ Chetas.

Track listing
No.	Title	Lyrics	Music	Singer(s)	Length
1.	"Dheeme Dheeme"	Mellow D, Tanishk Bagchi, Tony Kakkar	Tanishk Bagchi, Tony Kakkar	Neha Kakkar, Tony Kakkar	2:57
2.	"Ankhiyon Se Goli Mare"	Shabbir Ahmed	Tanishk Bagchi	Mika Singh, Tulsi Kumar	3:26
3.	"Dilbara"	Navi Ferozpurwala	Sachet–Parampara	Sachet Tandon, Parampara Thakur	4:07
4.	"Tu Hi Yaar Mera"	Kumaar	Rochak Kohli	Arijit Singh, Neha Kakkar	3:20
5.	"Dilbara" (Version 2)	Navi Ferozpurwala	Sachet-Paramapara	B Praak	4:08
6.	"Ankhiyon Se Goli Maare Returns"	Shabbir Ahmed	Lijo George – DJ Chetas	Dev Negi, Asees Kaur	3:39
Total length:					21:36

== Reception ==
The film earned ₹103.44 crore in whole India and ₹14.26 crore overseas, for a worldwide collection of ₹117.70 crore.

On the review aggregator website Rotten Tomatoes, 43% of 14 critics' reviews are positive, with an average rating of 5.3/10.

=== Accolades ===
For her performance, Ananya Panday won a Filmfare Award for Best Female Debut in February 2020. Later in 2020, Kartik Aaryan was awarded with the Zee Cine Award for Best Actor in a Comic Role.

== Sequel ==
A spiritual sequel Pati Patni Aur Woh Do, starring Ayushmann Khurrana, Sara Ali Khan, Wamiqa Gabbi and Rakul Preet Singh was released on 15 May 2026.
