= Yaari Hai =

Single by Tony Kakkar

Single by Tony Kakkar
- Language: Hindi
- English title: "It's Friendship"
- Released: 3 August 2019
- Studio: AMV
- Length: 4:16
- Label: Desi Music Factory
- Songwriter: Tony Kakkar
- Producer: Tony Kakkar

Music video
- "Yaari Hai" on YouTube

"Yaari Hai" (transl. It's Friendship) is a song by Tony Kakkar. It was released as a single on 3 August 2019 by Desi Music Factory.

The song received over 100 million views on YouTube in November 2019. The song features Riyaz Aly, Siddharth Nigam and Jaikant Bhardwaj.

As of Feb 2025, the song has over 397 million views.
