= Sonu Kakkar =

Indian playback singer and songwriter

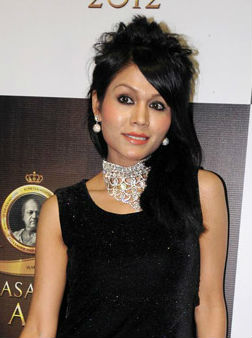
- Born: Rishikesh, Uttar Pradesh (present-day Uttarakhand), India
- Occupations: Playback singer; songwriter; television personality
- Spouse: Neeraj Sharma (m. 2006)
- Relatives: Neha Kakkar (sister); Tony Kakkar (brother)
- Musical career
- Origin: India
- Genres: Bollywood
- Years active: 2002–present
- Label: T-Series

YouTube information
- Channel: Sonu Kakkar
- Years active: 2011–present
- Genres: Entertainment; music
- Subscribers: 2.46 million
- Views: 460 million
- Last updated: 4 August 2026

Sonu Kakkar is an Indian playback singer, songwriter and television personality. She is the elder sister of Bollywood singers, Neha Kakkar and Tony Kakkar. Sonu Kakkar was born in Rishikesh on October 20, 1979 in Uttarakhand. One of her most popular songs is Madari which she performed in Coke Studio with Vishal Dadlani. It was composed by Clinton Cerejo. Sonu Kakkar's recent songs include 'Sun Baliye' sung by Gajendra Verma, Sonu Kakkar. The music video features Gajendra Verma And Apoorva Arora.

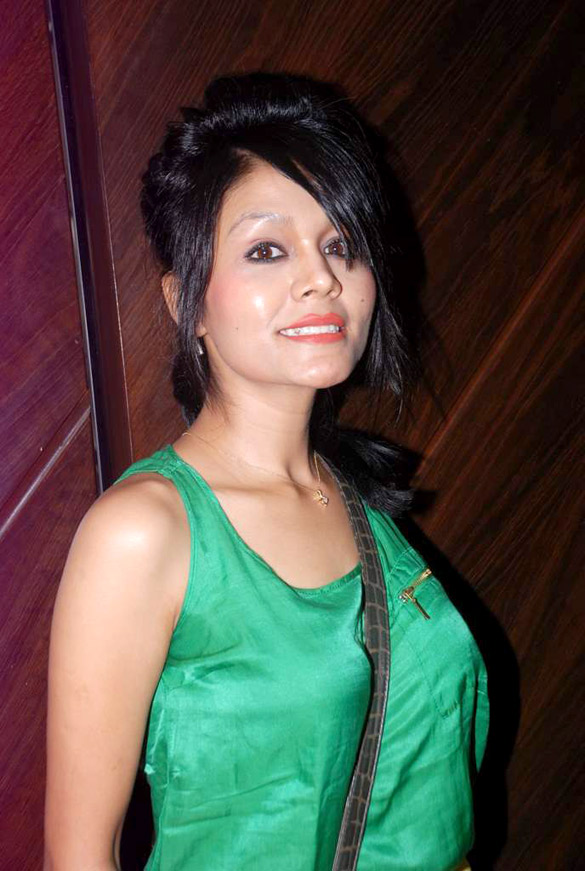
Sonu Kakkar at audio release of Chand Ke Pare

== Television ==
List of television shows and roles
Year	Show	Role	Channel
2020	Sa Re Ga Ma Pa Punjabi	Judge	Zee Punjabi
2021	Indian Idol 12	Judge	Sony TV

== Discography ==
=== Studio albums ===
- Madari (2012)
- Aisi Bani (2013)

=== Singles ===
Year	Song	Composer(s)	Writer(s)	Co-singer(s)
2013	"Akhiyan Nu Rehn De"	Tony Kakkar		
2014	"Urban Munda"	Tony Kakkar		
2015	"Makhan Malai"	Sham-Balkar		
2019	"Kyu Saath Tumhara Choota Hai"	Jeet Gannguli	Kumar Vishwas	
2021	"Sun Baliye"	Mann Taneja		Gajendra Verma
2021	"Booty Shake"	Tony Kakkar		
2021	"Akhaa Vich"	Sanjeev Chaturvedi - Ajay	Sanjeev Chaturvedi	
2024	"O Rangreza"	Sanjeev Chaturvedi	Sanjeev Chaturvedi	

=== Playback singing ===
==== Hindi songs ====
Year	Film	Song	Composer(s)	Writer(s)	Co-singer(s)
2003	Dum	Babuji Zara Dheere Chalo	Sandeep Chowta	Sameer	Sukhwinder Singh
2003	Dum	Babuji Zara (Bijli Mix)	Sandeep Chowta	Sameer	Sukhwinder Singh
2003	Boom	Seduction Saavariya	Sandeep Chowta	Sandeep Chowta	Sunitha Sarathy
2004	Naach	Ishq Da Tadka	Nitin Raikwar		Adnan Sami
2004	Kis Kis Ki Kismat	Honey Moon	D. Imman	Farhad Wadia	Sonu Nigam
2005	Sheesha	Kar Mundya	Dilip Sen-Sameer Sen		
2006	Sandwich	Sayonee	Sukwinder Singh		Sukhwinder Singh
2006	Corporate	O Sikandar (Desi Mix)	Shamir Tandon		Kailash Kher, Sapna Mukherjee
2006	Iqraar by Chance	Ghoonghat Na Khol	Sandesh Shandilya		Shabab Sabri
2006	Jigyaasa	Khatiya Toot Gayee	Ram Shankar		
2006	Ladies Tailor	Har Raat Teri	Nishad Chandra	Ankit Sagar	Kunal Ganjawala, Sunidhi Chauhan, Gayatri Iyer
2007	Risk	Hitchki	Amitabh Verma	Akbar Sami	
2007	Risk	Hitchki (Remix version)	Amitabh Verma	Akbar Sami	
2007	Delhi Heights	Ey Gori (Holi)			
2007	Bombay to Goa	Lawani	Ravi Meet		
2008	Mukhbiir	Jeena	Sandeep Chowta	P. K. Mishra	
2008	Mukhbiir	Piya Mera Banjaara	Karthik Raja	P. K. Mishra	
2009	Toss	Abe Saale	Shamir Tandon	Sandeep Nath	
2009	Blue	Blue theme	A. R. Rahman	Raqeeb Alam, Sukhwinder Singh	Blaaze, Raqeeb Alam, Jaspreet Jasz, Neha Kakkar, Dilshaad Shaikh
2009	Jail	Bareilly Ke Bazzar Mein			
2009	Ek Se Bure Do	Meri Har Ada Ke Charche			
2010	Nakshatra	Dj Sheizwood	Harry Anand, Rani Malik, Nawab Arzoo	Kalpana Chauhan, Taraannum Mallik	
2010	Mittal v/s Mittal	Aao Seene Se Lag Ke (Lounge Version)	Shamir Tandon	Shabbir Ahmed	Kailash Kher
2011	No One Killed Jessica	Aali Re Sali Re	Amit Trivedi	Amitabh Bhattacharya	Raja Hasan, Aditi Singh Sharma, Anushka Manchanda, Tochi Raina, Shriram Iyer, Bonnie Chakraborty, Sonika Sharma
2012	Joker	Singh Raja	G. V. Prakash Kumar	Shirish Kunder	Daler Mehndi
2012	Jism 2	Yeh Kasoor	Mithoon		
2013	Mere Dad Ki Maruti	Hip Hip Huraah	Sachin Gupta (musician)		
2013	Boss	Boss Entry – Theme	Meet Bros Anjjan	Kumaar	Meet Bros Anjjan, Khushboo Grewal
2014	Queen	London Thumukda	Amit Trivedi	Anvita Dutt	Labh Janjua, Neha Kakkar
2014	Life Mein Twist Hai	Ishq Barsa Re	Aryan Jaiin		Nishad Mishra
2014	Babloo Happy Hai	Banjaran	Bishakh-Kanish	Protique Mojoomdar	Rahul Ram
2015	Margarita With A Straw	Foreign Balamwa	Mikey McCleary	Prasoon Joshi	
2015	Guddu Ki Gun	"Ding Dong"	Gajendra Verma, Vikram Singh		
2016	Fever	Dil Ashkon Mein			Tony Kakkar
2016	Fever	Kya Kasak			
2016	Fever	Khaara Khaara	Tony Kakkar		
2017	Running Shaadi	Bhaag Milky Bhaag	Keegan Pinto	Keegan Pinto, Sonal Sehgal	Sanam Puri
2018	Jack and Dil	Chuski	Arko Pravo Mukherjee	Vayu	Arko
2019	Cabaret	Phir Teri Bahon Mein	Tony Kakkar		
2019	Officer Arjun Singh IPS Batch 2000	"Haye Re Jawani"			
2020	Sab Kushal Mangal	"Zamana Badal Gaya"	Harshit Saxena	Sameer Anjaan	Vandana Saxena
2020	Shubh Mangal Zyada Saavdhan	"Ooh La La"	Tanishk Bagchi, Tony Kakkar	Tony Kakkar	Neha Kakkar, Tony Kakkar
2021	Tuesdays & Fridays	"Funky Mohabbat"	Tony Kakkar	Tony Kakkar	Shreya Ghoshal, Benny Dayal

==== Kannada songs ====
Year	Film	Song	Composer(s)	Writer(s)	Co-singer(s)
2004	Ranga SSLC	"Oora Kannu"	Sandeep Chowta	V. Nagendra Prasad	Raju Ananthaswamy
2005	Jogi	"Bin Ladennu Nan Maava"	Gurukiran	Prem	Gurukiran
2005	Nammanna	"Mavayya"	Gurukiran	Gurukiran	
2007	Milana	"Kaddu Kaddu"	Mano Murthy	V. Nagendra Prasad	Suresh Peters
2008	Bindaas	"Kallu Mama"	Gurukiran	Kaviraj	Gurukiran
2009	Shivamani	"Rama Rama"	Gurukiran		
2010	Shankar IPS	"Sale Sale"	Gurukiran	Raghu Dixit	
2012	Godfather	"Deepavali"	A. R. Rahman	K. Kalyan	Abhay Jodhpurkar, Apoorva, Swetha Majethiya, Arun Haridas Kamath
2019	Ayushman Bhava	"Thembare Bottuvana"			

==== Telugu songs ====
Year	Film	Song	Composer(s)	Writer(s)	Co-singer(s)
2005	Kokila	"Pavan Laa"	Madhukar		
2005	Sri	"Holi Holi"	Sandeep Chowta	Suddala Ashok Teja	Rajesh Krishnan, Teesha Nigam
2005	Political Rowdy	"LKG Dress"	Sandeep Chowta	Suddala Ashok Teja	Teesha Nigam
2005	Super	"Akkad Bakkad"	Sandeep Chowta	Kandikonda	
2005	Super	"Mudduletti"	Sandeep Chowta	Bhaskarabhatla Ravikumar	Sonu Nigam
2006	Shankar	"Ala Bala"	Vandemataram Srinivas		
2006	Maa Iddari Madhya	"Magada"	R. P. Patnaik		
2006	Samanyudu	"Yemera"	Vandemataram Srinivas	Kaluva Krishna Sai	
2008	Sammakka Sarakka Mahathyam	"Taatibellem Tedharotti"	Vandemataram Srinivas		
2008	Junctiom	"Nachavura Nachavura"			
2008	Bujjigadu	"Chitti Ayirey"	Sandeep Chowta	Bhaskarabhatla Ravi Kumar	Pradip Somasundaran
2009	Kalavar King	"Aa Bugga"	Anil.R	Krishna Chaitanya	Baba Sehgal
2009	Kalavar King	"De Thadi"	Anil.R	Krishna Chaitanya	Antony
2009	Saleem	"Poolu Gusa Gusa"	Sandeep Chowta	Chandrabose	Pradip Somasundaran
2009	Blue (D)	"Blue Theme"	A. R. Rahman	Rajasri	Vijay Prakash, Naresh Iyer, Blaaze, A. R. Reihana, Raqeeb Alam
2010	Badmash	"Mandukottu"			
2010	Kedi	"Relarey"	Sandeep Chowta	Chinni Charan	
2013	Baadshah	"Rangoli Rangoli"	S. Thaman	Ramajogayya Sastry	Divya Kumar
2016	Sarrainodu	"Sarrainodu"	S. Thaman	Ramajogayya Sastry	Hard Kaur, Brijesh Shandilya, Geetha Madhuri
2016	Policeodu (D)	"Rangu"	G. V. Prakash Kumar		

==== Tamil songs ====
Year	Film	Song	Composer(s)	Writer(s)	Co-singer(s)
2006	Varalaru	Dhinam Dhinam Deepavali	A. R. Rahman	Vairamuthu	Kalpana Raghavendar, Ranjith, Leon James, Peer Mohammed
2009	Arumugam	Salona	Deva	Pa. Vijay	Udit Narayan
2009	Ainthaam Padai	Sokku Sundar	D. Imman		
2013	Naan Rajavaga Pogiren	"Malgova"	G. V. Prakash Kumar	Annamalai	
2016	Theri	"Raangu"	G. V. Prakash Kumar	Kabilan	T. Rajender, G. V. Prakash Kumar

==== Marathi songs ====
Year	Film	Song	Composer(s)	Writer(s)	Co-singer(s)
2008	Mi Amruta Boltey	Naad Karaycha Naay..			
2009	Nau Mahine Nau Diwas	Mastani Jwanit Mazya			
2014	Pune Via Bihar	Kacchi Kairi Hu	Amit Hadkar		Raja Hasan
2017	Karaar	Chuklya Wata	Vijay Gawande, Paresh Shah		Avadhoot Gupte

==== Malayalam songs ====
Year	Film	Song	Composer(s)	Writer(s)	Co-singer(s)
2013	Kalimannu	Dil Lena"	M. Jayachandran		
2013	Kalimannu	Meine To"	M. Jayachandran		Sukhwinder Singh

==== Punjabi songs ====
Year	Film	Song	Composer(s)	Writer(s)	Co-singer(s)
2009	Jag Jeondeyan De Mele	Gustakh Akhan			Harbhajan Mann
2011	I Am Singh	Channd Paregge	Monty Sharma		Sukhwinder Singh
2013	Jatt Airways	Ok Report	Jassi Katyal	Kumaar	Master Saleem
2013	Jatt Airways	Ok Report (Remix)	Jassi Katyal	Kumaar	Master Saleem
2013	Young Malang	Lakk Ch Current			
2013	Fer Mamla Gadbad Gadbad	Lakk Gadvi Varga	Jaggi Singh		Roshan Prince
2013	Pinky Moge Wali	Tadka	Gurmeet Singh & Rohit		
2014	Yoddha	"Reshma"	Gurmeet Singh	Daksh Ajit Singh	
2015	Gun & Goal	ghatta ghatt kar ke"	Jaggi Singh	Rajveer bawa	Jaggi Singh
2018	Kande	Thumka	Gurmeet Singh	Baaz	Nachattar Gill
2018	Kande	Tere Naal	Gurmeet Singh	Baaz	Feroz Khan
2019	Kala Shah Kala	Boliyaan	Bunny Bains	Bunny Bains	

=== Nepali songs ===
Year	Film	Song	Composer(s)	Writer(s)	Co-singer(s)
2014	Kohinoor	Salaam Lijiye Kabool Kijiye	Sambhujeet Baskota	Sambhujeet Baskota	Udit Narayan

=== Bhojpuri songs ===
Year	Film	Song	Composer(s)	Writer(s)	Co-singer(s)
2005	Dulha Milal Dildar	"Hamra Lehanga Mein Lal Sitara"			Solo

== Awards and nominations ==
Year	Award	Category	Work	Result	Ref.
2004	MTV Immies	Best Debutant Trophy	"Babuji Zara Dheere Chalo"	Won	
