= Mud Mud Ke =

Single by Tony Kakkar and Neha Kakkar

Single by Tony Kakkar and Neha Kakkar
- Language: Hindi
- Released: 12 February 2022
- Genre: Indian pop
- Length: 3:30
- Label: Desi Music Factory
- Songwriter: Tony Kakkar

Music video
- "Mud Mud Ke" on YouTube

"Mud Mud Ke" (transl. Don't Turn Around And Look) is a Hindi song written by Tony Kakkar and sung by Tony Kakkar and Neha Kakkar. The video of the song is directed by Mihir Gulati and the music is produced by Anshul Garg and Tony Kakkar under Desi Music Factory. This song features Michele Morrone and Jacqueline Fernandez in the music video.

== Cast ==
- Michele Morrone
- Jacqueline Fernandez
- Tony Kakkar

== Music video ==
The music video titled "Mud Mud Ke" was released by Desi Music Factory on YouTube. The music video marks the debut of an Italian actor Michele Morrone in the Indian Music Industry alongside Sri Lankan Actress Jacqueline Fernandez was shot in Dubai.

The song depicts Morrone as a Gangster doing a business deal and fighting with rival.

== Reception ==
It received more than 2 million views on YouTube trending at #4 within 12 hours of the official release.

== Personnel ==
- Song : "Mud Mud Ke"
- Starring : Michele Morrone and Jacqueline Fernandez
- Location : Dubai
- Singer : Tony Kakkar and Neha Kakkar
- Lyricist and Composer : Tony Kakkar
- Music Director : Tony Kakkar
- Mixing and Mastering : Naweed @whitfieldmastering, London
- Video Director : Mihir Gulati
- DOP : Manish Shunty
- Editor : Hitesh Chandwani (Frogalised Productions)
- Assistant Director : Rishabh Dang and Hitesh Chandwani
- Producers : Anshul Garg and Tony Kakkar
- Choreographer : Shakti Mohan
- Online Promotion: Underdog Digital
- Label : Desi Music Factory
- Supporting Production : Metro Talkies & Third Eye Films, Dubai
