= DJ Chetas =

Indian disc jockey and music producer

- Born: Chetas Shah; Mumbai
- Occupations: Disc jocky, music producer
- Years active: 2012–present

Chetas Shah, known professionally as DJ Chetas, is an Indian disc jockey and music producer. He is primarily known for his Bollywood Mashups and remixes. DJ Chetas ranked World No. 33 on the DJ MAG Top 100 DJs list.

== Biography ==
Shah belongs to Mumbai, Maharashtra. In an interview with Deccan Chronicle, He told “As a class 10 student, after witnessing a friend’s older brother mix two tracks together on his computer, Chetas was lured into creating his first few remixes”. He started his career with creating Bollywood mash-ups and remixes. He is the first Indian to be featured in a DJ Mag's Top 100 ranked him 59 in 2015 and ranked 33 in 2016. His debut album was titled Life is a Mashup. after this he released various mashups and remixes like Iqraar By Chance, Atif Mashups, Jab Koi Baat (recreated), Baby Ko Bass Pasand Hai (remix), Backbone (remix), MTV Beats House Party Dance Mix, among others. He also composed music for various films like Dilwale, Humpty Sharma Ki Dulhania, All is Well, Indian Police Force, Golmaal Again. He also contributed as an official DJ for Kolkata Knight Riders in the IPL.

== Discography ==
- Life is a Mashup
- Aap Se Mausiiquii with Himesh Reshmiya
- Desi Kali (remix) with Pritam, Sunidhi Chahuan
- Aao Na (remix) with Sonu Nigam
- Nachan Farrate (MB Swag) with Meet Bros, Kanika Kapoor
- Saiyan Superstar (remix) Tulsi Kumar
- Desi Look (remix) Kanika Kapoor
- Dekhte Dekhte (remix) Atif Aslam, Nusrat Fateh Ali Khan
- Jaane Kyon with Udit Narayan, Alka Yagnik
- High Rated Gabru (remix) with Guru Randhawa
- Tujhe Kitna Chahne Lge (remix) with Arijit Singh
- Beete Lamhein (remix) with KK
- Bichdann (remix) with Rahat Fateh Ali Khan
- Tu Hai Ki Nahi (remix) with Ankit Tiwari
- Kabhi Jo Badal Barse (remix) with Arijit Singh
- Saadi Gali Aaja (remix) with Ayushmann Khurana
- Shanivaar Raati (remix) with Arijit Singh
- Ban Ja Rani (remix) Guru Randhawa
- Aye Khuda (remix) Salim Merchant
- Allah Duhai Hai Mashup
- Jab Koi Baat recreated with Atif Aslam
- Jeetenge Hum with Dhvani Bhanushali
- Jaana Samjho Na with Aditya Rikhari, Tulsi Kumar, Lijo George

=== Film (Along with Lijo George) ===
- Dilwale (2015)
- Azhar (2016)
- Golmaal Again (2017)
- Loveyatri (2018)
- Mitron (2018)
- Simmba (2018)
- Pati Patni Aur Woh (2019)
- Good Newwz (2019)
- Coolie No. 1 (2020)
- Bhuj: The Pride of India (2021)
- Sooryavanshi (2021)
- Liger (2022)
- Cirkus (2022)
- Selfiee (2023) - 1 song
- Bad Newz (2024) - 1 song
- Ghudchadi (2024)
- Bhool Bhulaiyaa 3 (2024)
- Indian Police Force (2024) (TV Series)
- Son of Sardaar 2 (2025)
- Ek Deewane Ki Deewaniyat (2025) - "Bol Kaffara Kya Hoga"
- De De Pyaar De 2 (2025) (Along with Avvy Sra)
