= Raabta (song) =

Hindi Pop song

Song by Pritam feat. Arijit Singh, Aditi Singh Sharma, Hamsika Iyer, Joi, Shreya Ghoshal, Nikhita Gandhi, Jubin Nautiyal and Shirley Setia

from the album Agent Vinod and Raabta
- Released: 10 February 2012
- Genre: Filmi; Rock; Pop
- Length: 4:04 (Original Version); 3:31 (Night in Motel); 4:50 (Siyaah Raatein) and (Kehte Hain Khuda Ne); 4:57 (Raabta Title Song)
- Label: T-Series
- Composer: Pritam Chakraborty
- Lyricists: Amitabh Bhattacharya (Agent Vinod and Raabta films); Irshad Kamil (Remix from Raabta)

Agent Vinod and Raabta track listing
- 1. "I Will Do the Talking Tonight"; 2. "Pungi"; 3. "Raabta"; 4. "Agent Vinod (Theme)"; 5. "I Will Do the Talking Tonight (Remix)"; 6. "Raabta (Night in Motel)"; 7. "Pungi (Remix)"; 8. "Raabta (Kehte Hain Khuda Ne)"; 9. "Raabta (Siyaah Raatein)"; 10. "Dil Mera Muft Ka"; 11. "Dil Mera Muft Ka (Remix)"; 12. "Raabta Title Song"

Music video
- "Raabta" on YouTube

"Raabta" (transl. Connection) is a romantic song from the 2012 Hindi film, Agent Vinod. Composed by Pritam Chakraborty, the song is sung by Arijit Singh, with lyrics penned by Amitabh Bhattacharya. The music video of the track features actors Saif Ali Khan and Kareena Kapoor, and the remix video of the song stars Deepika Padukone, Sushant Singh Rajput, Kriti Sanon and Jim Sarbh from Raabta.(2017).

The song has 3 other versions included in the soundtrack of the album titled, "Raabta (Night in a Motel)", "Raabta (Siyaah Raatein)" and "Raabta (Kehte Hain Khuda Ne)" which features vocals by Aditi Singh Sharma, Hamsika Iyer and Shreya Ghoshal respectively, and also has another version titled, "Raabta Title Song" from the film Raabta which features vocals by Nikhita Gandhi, with additional vocals by Singh for all 4 versions.

== Release ==
The first 4 versions of the song were released on 10 February 2012 along with other tracks in the album. The music video of the song was officially released on 9 March 2012, through the YouTube channel of T-Series. The version of the song used in this music video is the original version by Arijit Singh. However, the "Night in Motel" version, sung by Aditi Singh Sharma along with Singh, is used in the film.

The first 4 versions of the song collectively, were ranked at #7 in the list of "Best Songs of 2012" published by Bollywood Spice on 8 January 2013. Arijit Singh was included in the list of "Best Male Singer 2012" published by Koimoi on 2 January 2013. The song was placed at #3 in the list of "The most popular love song on Gaana" which was published by The Times of India on 14 February 2013.

The remix version of the song was released on 27 April 2017 alongside much fanfare with the new trend of remixing old songs taking over movies. The song has more than 35 million views on YouTube within a month's time. It was also praised for its beat and the video.

== Critical reception ==
The composition of the song by Pritam, lyrics by Amitabh Bhattacharya, Irshad Kamil and renditions by the singers in their respective versions were well received by the reviewers.

Bollywood Hungama's Joginder Tuteja praised all 4 versions of the song and commented: "Special mention for lyricist Bhattacharya who indeed ends up getting something new to cheer about and demonstrates once again that he has a good knack of playing around with words".

== Night in a Motel ==
=== Background ===
The song marks the first time Aditi Singh Sharma has lent her voice for Kareena Kapoor Khan, the next being "Main Heroine Hoon" from Heroine (2012). Sharma was nominated for the Stardust New Musical Sensation Singer – Female award for her rendition in the version of the song, along with "Main Heroine Hoon".

This version of the song was used in the film from the 4 versions and was incorrectly credited to Hamsika Iyer instead of Sharma on the CD cover, though Iyer's vocals are used in the digital release of "Night in a Motel". Compared to Singh's solo version, the production of "Night in Motel" is largely piano-based, with a notable viola section preceding Singh's verse.

=== Critical reception ===
The version along with "Kehte Hain Khuda Ne" by Shreya Ghoshal was picked as best tracks in the album by Filmfare's Rachit Gupta.

== Siyaah Raatein ==
The third version of the song titled "Raabta (Siyaah Raatein)" is sung by Hamsika Iyer. In comparison, by the composition of the song, to that of the version "Night in a Motel", an electric guitar is added to the tune and the drum beat is softened, apart from the use of piano. Additional English vocals were rendered by Joi, in the version of the song.

== Kehte Hain Khuda Ne ==
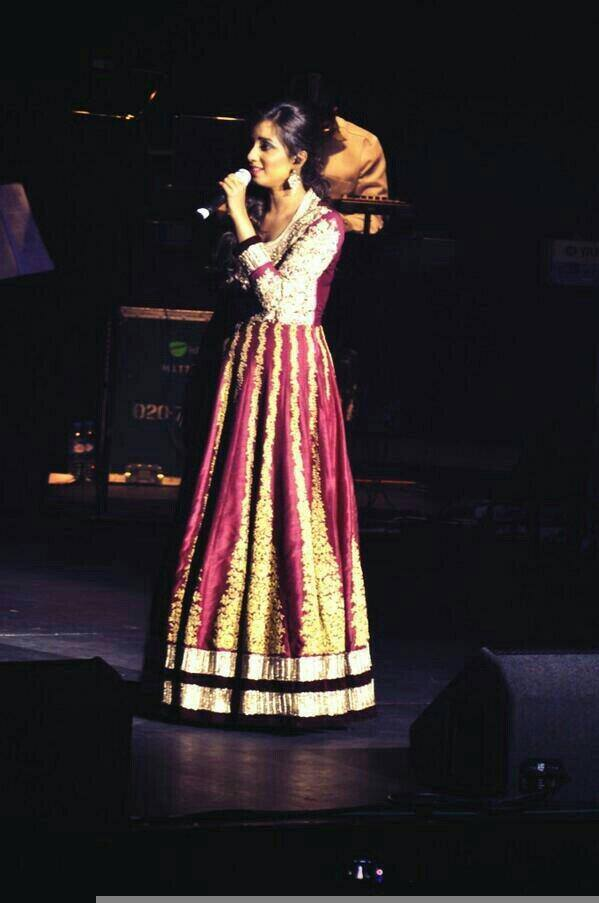
Shreya Ghoshal performing at the concert held at World Forum, the Netherlands on 31 May 2014, where she performed the song live.

The final version of the song titled "Raabta (Kehte Hain Khuda Ne)" (transl. It is said that God) is sung by Shreya Ghoshal, over the same instrumental track as Hamsika Iyer's version. The lyrics included in the version by Amitabh Bhattacharya are the same as the original version.

=== Critical reception ===
Filmfare's Rachit Gupta picked the version by Ghoshal and the version "Night in a Motel" by Aditi Singh Sharma for the best track in the album.

== 2017 Remake ==
A remake of the song, also produced by Pritam, was used as the title track for the 2017 film Raabta. The song was sung by Nikhita Gandhi with Arijit Singh also returning. The music video stars Deepika Padukone in a cameo role alongside the film's stars Sushant Singh Rajput, Kriti Sanon and Jim Sarbh. The video is produced by T-Series.

== T-Series Mixtape version ==
Shirley Setia and Jubin Nautiyal sang the Mixtape version of the song "Tu Jo Mila Raabta", which is a medley of "Raabta" and "Tu Jo Mila" from Bajrangi Bhaijaan, which was also composed by Pritam, with lyrics by Kausar Munir .

== Live performance ==
The music-composer Pritam performed the song live in IIFA Rocks 2013 along with Arijit Singh and Aditi Singh Sharma, which also celebrated 100 years of Indian cinema. Singh performed the song on 30 December 2013, on the concert "Salaam Dubai" which was organised by Oberoi Middle East. He also performed the song at a private concert for the Connoisseurs Club Dubai on 7 November 2014. On 19 October 2014, singer Shreya Ghoshal performed the song at her concert which was held at Rajkot.

Aditi Singh Sharma also performed the love ballad, at the Atif Aslam concert which was presented by ARN Entertainment and R.V Steels and Power on 22 May 2014. She even performed the song at "Tum Hi Ho" live concert at the San Jose State University Event Center on 9 August 2014. Both Singh and Sharma performed their version of the song at Singh's London debut concert at the Indigo Arena on 29 August 2014.

== Accolades ==
Award	Category	Nominee	Result	Ref
5th Mirchi Music Awards	Song representing Sufi tradition	–	Nominated	
