= Main Tera Boyfriend =

Hindi Pop song

Song by Arijit Singh, Meet Bros, Neha Kakkar

from the album Raabta
- Released: May 22, 2017
- Genre: Filmi, Dance pop, Pop-folk
- Composers: Sohrabuddin; Sourav Roy; Eric Pillai
- Lyricists: Jitendra Raghuvanshi; Kumaar
- Producers: Sourav Roy; Eric Pillai

Music video
- "Main Tera Boyfriend" on YouTube

Main Tera Boyfriend (transl. I'm your boyfriend) is a Hindi song by Meet Bros, Arijit Singh, and Neha Kakkar, from the soundtrack of the 2017 Hindi-language film Raabta. It is a remake of the 2007 song "Girl Friend Boy Friend", performed by Gopal Sharma, from the compilation album Punjabi Blockbuster. The original song was written by Jitendra Raghuvanshi, and composed by Sohrabuddin, while the remake was written by Kumaar and composed and produced by Sourav Roy and Eric Pillai. The music video of the song stars Sushant Singh Rajput and Kriti Sanon.

== Music video ==
The dance choreography of the song's music video was done by Ahmed Khan.

== Reception ==
Daily News and Analysis' Prachita Pandey wrote, "It's so refreshing to hear Arijit Singh crooning something fun and peppy after a series of heartbreaking/slow/soft romantic numbers. He proves yet again that he can sing any song with utmost perfection. Neha Kakkar complements him well, but we felt her vocals to be a bit toned down in terms of energy. Meet brothers too have sung some additional portions in the song." News18 described the song as the "Party Anthem of the Season".

== Allegations of plagiarism ==
Punjabi pop singer Jagdeep Singh, known by his stage name J-Star accused T-Series of recreating his 2015 song "Na Na Na Na" without his permission. He claimed that the label approached him to license the rights to the song but a dispute in the terms of the contract prevented it from going forward and T-Series eventually produced the song. T-Series responded with a statement saying that the song was actually a remake of the 2007 song titled "Girl Friend Boy Friend" sung by Gopal Sharma, included on the album Punjabi Blockbuster, that was produced by the label as part of a Punjabi-language compilation. The label further warned Singh against misleading people and stated that "he should be thankful that no legal action was taken against him by them for infringement of the 2007 song".
