= Aankh Maarey =

2018 song by Kumar Sanu

"Aankh Mare"

Song by Kumar Sanu and Kavita Krishnamurthy

from the album Tere Mere Sapne
- Language: Hindi
- Released: 1996
- Studio: T-Series
- Genre: Bollywood; filmi
- Label: T-Series
- Composer(s): Viju Shah
- Lyricist(s): Anand Bakshi
- Producer(s): T-Series

Music video
- "Aankh Maarey" on YouTube

"Aankh Maarey" (transl. Wink) is a Hindi-language song, originally composed by Viju Shah and sung by Kumar Sanu and Kavita Krishnamurthy for the 1996 Bollywood film Tere Mere Sapne, as picturized on Arshad Warsi and Simran.

The Tere Mere Sapne soundtrack album was released by T-Series and sold 2.2 million units in India, making it the ninth best-selling Bollywood soundtrack of 1996.

== 2018 version ==
"Aankh Maarey"

Song by Neha Kakkar, Mika Singh and Kumar Sanu

from the album Simmba
- Language: Hindi
- Released: 6 December 2018
- Studio: T-Series
- Genre: Bollywood; filmi
- Length: 3:33
- Label: T-Series
- Composer(s): Tanishk Bagchi
- Lyricist(s): Shabbir Ahmed
- Producer(s): T-Series

Music video
- "Aankh Marey" on YouTube

"Aankh Maarey" was remixed by Tanishk Bagchi for the 2018 film Simmba, with the vocals of Neha Kakkar and Mika Singh. The music video is mainly picturized on the film's leading stars Ranveer Singh and Sara Ali Khan, and features several cameo appearances, Kumar Sanu has sung this song for Arshad Warsi.

=== Reception ===
The song became a major hit, with its video going viral within hours of its release by T-Series on YouTube, where it's received a total of over 1 billion views. Between 6 December 2018 to 5 December 2019, it became the first Indian song to cross the milestone of 1.4 billion views on YouTube.
