= Tony Kakkar =

Indian singer (born 1984)

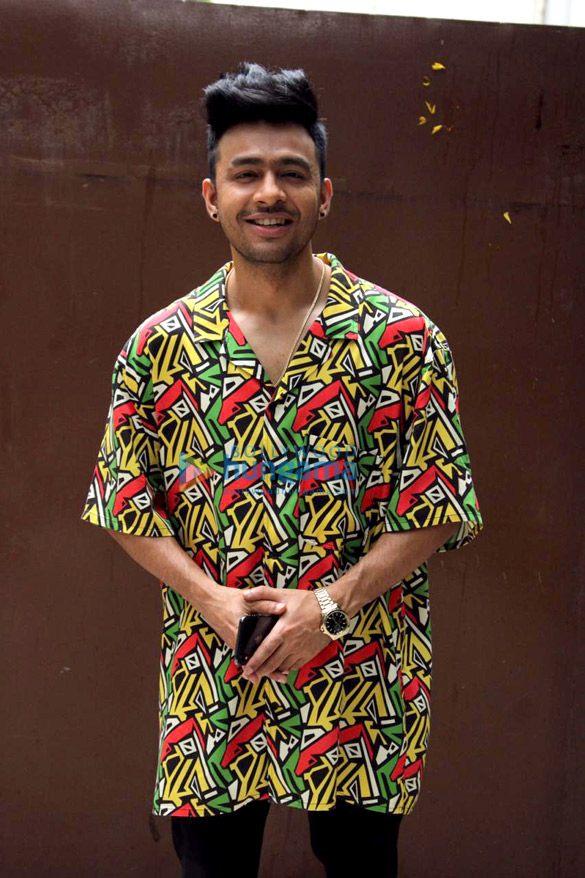
- Tony Kakkar in 2019

Background information
- Born: 9 April 1984 (age 42); Rishikesh, Uttar Pradesh, (present-day Uttarakhand), India
- Genres: pop World music, Indian pop, Bhangra, Bollywood music
- Occupations: Singer; composer
- Label: Desi Music Factory Tonew Musik

YouTube information
- Channel: Tony Kakkar
- Years active: 2014–present
- Genres: Entertainment; music
- Subscribers: 4.67 million
- Views: 745.1 million
- Last updated: 23 October 2025

Tony Kakkar (born 9 April 1984) is an Indian singer and music composer known for his cringe pop songs. He made his debut in Bollywood in 2012, as a music director with the film Mr. Bhatti on Chutti, for which he composed the song "Good Boys Bad Boys". He is the brother of singers Sonu Kakkar and Neha Kakkar. In 2014, he founded Desi Music Factory, a record label along with Anshul Garg.

== Early life ==
Kakkar has two sisters, Sonu Kakkar and Neha Kakkar. Hailing from Rishikesh, their family moved to Delhi in 1990s, where the siblings used to sing at jagratas. In 2004, Kakkar and his sister Neha shifted to Mumbai. In Mumbai, he started learning the technical aspects of composing music. During this time, he also worked as a lyricist for composer Sandeep Chowta. He composed the song "Sawan Aaya Hai" for the film Creature 3D. In 2015, he founded the record label Desi Music Factory together with Anshul Garg.

== Plagiarism allegations ==
Kakkar has been criticised and accused of copying visuals from K-pop songs on several occasions. The visuals for "Shona Shona," which was released in 2020, are similar to B1A4's "Like A Movie" and IZ*ONE's "Beware". "Booty Shake", released in 2021, is also heavily based on a K-pop song. The music video is being alleged to be similar to K-pop girl group Blackpink's music video called "Ice Cream".

== Television ==
- 2020 - Taare Zameen Par as mentor along with Shankar Mahadevan and Jonita Gandhi.

== Discography ==
=== Film soundtracks ===
Denotes films that have not yet been released

Year	Film/album	Title	Lyrics	Composer(s)	Co-singer	Ref.
2012	Mr. Bhatti on Chutti	"Good Boys Bad Boys"	Tony Kakkar	Tony Kakkar		
2014	Creature 3D	"Sawan Aaya Hai"	Tony Kakkar	Tony Kakkar	Arijit Singh	
2014	Creature 3D	"Mohabbat Barsa De"	Tony Kakkar	Tony Kakkar	Arijit Singh, Arjun, Samira Koppikar	
2014	Creature 3D	"Sawan Aaya Hai (Unplugged)"	Tony Kakkar	Tony Kakkar		
2015	Ek Paheli Leela	"Ek Do Teen Char"	Tony Kakkar	Tony Kakkar	Neha Kakkar	
2015	Ek Paheli Leela	"Khuda Bhi"	Manoj Muntashir	Tony Kakkar	Mohit Chauhan	
2016	Fever	"Mile Ho Tum"	Tony Kakkar	Tony Kakkar	Sonu Kakkar	
2016	Fever	"Khara Khara"	Tony Kakkar	Tony Kakkar	Sonu Kakkar	
2016	Fever	"Dil Ashkon Mein"	Tony Kakkar	Tony Kakkar	Sonu Kakkar	
2016	Fever	Mile Ho Tum (Reprise Version)	Tony Kakkar	Tony Kakkar	Neha Kakkar	
2016	One Night Stand	"Do Peg Maar"	Kumaar	Tony Kakkar	Neha Kakkar	
2017	Ranchi Diaries	"Helicopter"	Tony Kakkar	Tony Kakkar	Neha Kakkar	
2018	Hate Story 4	"Mohabbat Nasha Hai" (Duet)	Kumaar	Tony Kakkar	Neha Kakkar	
2018	Hate Story 4	"Mohabbat Nasha Hai"	Kumaar	Tony Kakkar		
2019	Luka Chuppi	"Coca Cola Tu (Remake)"	Tony Kakkar, Mellow D	Tanishk Bagchi, Tony Kakkar	Neha Kakkar, MellowD	
2019	Cabaret	"Phir Teri Bahon Mein"	Tony Kakkar	Tony Kakkar	Sonu Kakkar	
2019	Hume Tumse Pyaar Kitna	"Humne Rait Pe"	Sajan Agarwal	Tony Kakkar	Neha Kakkar	
2019	Pati Patni Aur Woh	"Dheeme Dheeme (Remake)"	Tanishk Bagchi, Tony Kakkar, MellowD	Tanishk Bagchi, Tony Kakkar	Neha Kakkar	
2020	Shubh Mangal Zyada Saavdhan	"Ooh La La"	Tony Kakkar	Tanishk Bagchi, Tony Kakkar	Sonu Kakkar, Neha Kakkar	
2021	Tuesdays and Fridays	"Ashleel"	Tony Kakkar	Tony Kakkar	Nakash Aziz, Neha Kakkar	
2021	Tuesdays and Fridays	"Phone Mein"	Tony Kakkar	Tony Kakkar	Neha Kakkar	
2021	Tuesdays and Fridays	"Akhiyaan"	Tony Kakkar	Tony Kakkar	Neha Kakkar, Bohemia	
2021	Tuesdays and Fridays	"Funky Mohabbat"	Kumaar	Tony Kakkar	Benny Dayal, Shreya Ghoshal, Sonu Kakkar	
2021	Tuesdays and Fridays	"Hanjuaan"	Kumaar	Tony Kakkar	Shreya Ghoshal	
2021	Tuesdays and Fridays	"The Golgappa Song"	Kumaar	Tony Kakkar	Benny Dayal, Sonu Kakkar	
2022	Ittu Si Baat	"17 Lakh Ka Gajra"	Rj Shekhar	Vishal Mishra	Asees Kaur, Vishal Mishra	
2024	Love Sex Aur Dhokha 2	"Kamsin Kali"	Tony Kakkar		Neha Kakkar	

=== Singles ===
Year	Title	Lyrics	Composer(s)
2012	"SRK Anthem" (Single)		Himself
2013	"Hanju"	Himself	Himself
	"Hanju" (DJ AKS Remix)	Himself	Himself
2014	"Hanju" (Unplugged)	Himself	Himself
2014	"Sawan Aaya Hai" (Unplugged)	Himself	Himself
2014	"Johnny Ho Dafaa"	Himself	Himself
2015	"Maa Tu Bataa"	Himself	Himself
2015	"Akhiyan"	Himself, Bohemia	Himself
2015	"Akhiyan" (DJ AKS Remix)	Himself, Bohemia	Himself
2015	"Car Mein Music Baja"	Himself	Himself
2016	"Baby Makeup Karna Chod"	Himself	Himself
2016	"Lori Suna"	Himself	Himself
2016	"Tu Chand Mera"	Himself, Pardhaan	Himself
2016	"Khuda Bhi Jab"	Himself	Himself
2016	"Khafa Mahiya"	Himself	Himself
2016	"Das Ki Karaan"	Himself	Himself
2016	"Teri Kamar Pe" ft. Gauahar Khan	Himself	Himself
2017	"Waada" ft. Nia Sharma	Himself	Himself
2017	"Sawan Aaya Hai"	Himself	Himself
2017	"Aaja Meri Bike Pe" ft. Iris Maity	Himself	Himself
2017	"Chaand Mera Naraaz Hai"	Himself	Himself
2017	"Sardi Ki Raat"	Himself	Himself
2018	"Coca Cola Tu" ft. Young Desi	Himself	Himself
2018	"Oh Humsafar" ft. Neha Kakkar and Himansh Kohli	Manoj Muntashir	Himself
2018	"Ludo" ft. Young Desi	Himself	Himself
2018	"Mamla Dil Da"	Himself	Himself
2019	"Kuch Kuch"	Himself	Himself
2019	"Dheeme Dheeme" ft. Neha Sharma	Himself	Himself
2019	"Yaari Hai" ft. Siddharth Nigam, Riyaz Aly	Himself	Himself
2019	"Bijli Ki Taar" ft. Urvashi Rautela	Himself	Himself
2019	"Naagin Jaisi" (Sangeetkar)	Himself	Himself
2019	"Kanta Bai" ft. Karishma Sharma	Himself	Himself
2019	"Naagin Jaisi Kamar Hila" ft. Elnaaz Norouzi	Himself	Himself
2020	"Goa Beach" ft. Aditya Narayan and Kat Kristian	Himself	Himself
2020	"Bheegi Bheegi"	Prince Dubey	Himself
2020	"Kurta Pajama" ft. Shehnaaz Kaur Gill	Himself	Himself
2020	"Chocolate" ft. Riyaz Aly & Avneet Kaur	Himself	Himself
2020	"Laila" ft. Heli Daruwala	Himself	Himself
2020	"Shona Shona" ft. Sidharth Shukla and Shehnaaz Gill	Himself	Himself
2021	"Gale Lagana Hai" ft. Shivin Narang and Nia Sharma	Himself	Himself
2021	"Booty Shake" ft. Hansika Motwani	Himself	Himself
2021	"Tera Suit" ft. Aly Goni and Jasmin Bhasin	Himself	Himself
2021	"Oh Sanam" ft. Hiba Nawab	Himself	Himself
2021	"Number Likh" ft. Nikki Tamboli	Himself	Himself
2021	"Saath Kya Nibhoge" ft. Sonu Sood and Niddhi Agerwal	Himself	Himself
2021	"Kanta Laga"	Himself	Himself
2022	"Mud Mud Ke" ft. Michele Morrone and Jacqueline Fernandez	Himself	Himself
2022	"Tera Mera Pyaar"	Himself	Himself
2022	"Main Akela Hoon"	Himself	Himself
2022	"Zindagi Bata De"	Himself	Himself
2022	"Kiss You" with Neha Kakkar	Himself	Himself
2022	"Dekh Lena"	Himself	Himself
2022	"Paparazzi Peeche"	Himself	Himself
2022	"Kaash"	Himself	Himself
2022	"12 Ladke"	Himself	Himself
2022	"Kudi Chandigarh Di" ft. Rohanpreet Singh	Himself	Himself
2023	"Whiskey Pilado"	Himself	Himself
2023	"Sitaron Tum So Jao"	Himself	Himself
2023	"Shadi Karogi" ft. Jasmin Bhasin	Himself	Himself
2023	"Chunari Mein Daag" ft. Yohani & Ikka	Himself	Himself
2023	"Gangster"	Himself	Himself
2023	"Senorita"	Himself	Himself
2023	"Dil Ko Sukoon"	Himself	Himself
2023	"Balenciaga" ft. Neha Kakkar	Himself	Himself
2023	"Iss Baar Sawan Mein"	Himself	Himself
2023	"Soniye"	Himself	Himself
2023	"Jamna Paar" with Neha Kakkar ft. Manisha Rani	Himself	Himself
2025	"Shat Pratishat"	Himself	Himself
2025	"Candy Shop" with Neha Kakkar	Himself	Himself
