= Raabta (film) =

2017 Indian film by Dinesh Vijan

- Theatrical release poster
- Directed by: Dinesh Vijan
- Written by: Siddharth-Garima
- Produced by: Dinesh Vijan; Homi Adajania; Bhushan Kumar
- Starring: Sushant Singh Rajput; Kriti Sanon; Jim Sarbh; Varun Sharma
- Narrated by: Irrfan Khan
- Cinematography: Martin Preiss
- Edited by: A. Sreekar Prasad; Huzefa Lokhandwala
- Music by: Score: Sachin–Jigar; Songs: Pritam; JAM8; Meet Bros
- Production companies: Maddock Films; T-Series
- Distributed by: AA Films
- Release date: 9 June 2017
- Running time: 148 minutes
- Country: India
- Language: Hindi

Raabta (transl. Connection) is a 2017 Indian Hindi-language fantasy romantic drama film directed by Dinesh Vijan in his directorial debut and co-produced by Vijan, Homi Adajania, and Bhushan Kumar under the banners Maddock Films and T-Series. The film stars Sushant Singh Rajput and Kriti Sanon in the lead roles, alongside Jim Sarbh and Varun Sharma in supporting roles with Rajkummar Rao in a cameo. The film's story is based on the concept of reincarnated star-crossed lovers.

Upon release, it received mixed-to-negative reviews from critics and was a commercial failure, grossing ₹39 crore worldwide.

== Plot ==
Shiv Kakkar, a fun-loving banker from Amritsar, moves to Budapest for a lucrative job opportunity along with his childhood friend, Radha. In Budapest, he continues his playboy ways until he meets Saira Singh, a chocolatier haunted by mysterious nightmares of drowning. Despite being on a date with another woman, Shiv feels an intense connection with Saira, who initially rejects his advances due to her existing relationship with her boyfriend, Manav. However, Shiv convinces her to be with him instead, leading to the end of her relationship with Manav.

As Shiv and Saira grow closer, she reveals her fear of water, stemming from a childhood trauma when her parents drowned. Shiv then leaves for a business trip, and during his absence, Saira meets Zakir, who later kidnaps her. Zakir claims they were lovers in a past life, showing her paintings of her from that time and triggering memories of her previous life as a warrior princess named Saiba. In that life, Saiba loved a warrior named Jilaan (Shiv in the present), but their love story ended in tragedy when Qaabir (Zakir in the present) killed Jilaan out of jealousy.

To prevent history from repeating, Saira initially agrees to marry Zakir but eventually decides to fight back. Shiv, unaware of their past lives but deeply in love with Saira, helps her escape. In a final confrontation, Zakir tries to kill Shiv, but they both fall into the ocean, and Zakir drowns while Saira saves Shiv. They are rescued by the navy, and ten years later, Shiv and Saira, now married with twin sons, visit the Golden Temple in Amritsar, signifying their peaceful future.

== Cast ==
- Sushant Singh Rajput in a dual role as
  - Jilaan: a warrior, Saiba's husband
  - Shiv Kakkar: Jilaan's reincarnation, Saira's husband
- Kriti Sanon in a dual role
  - Saiba Qazi: A warrior princess, Jilaan's wife
  - Saira Singh: Saiba's reincarnation, Shiv's wife
- Jim Sarbh in a dual role as
  - Qaabir: Saiba's former lover
  - Zakir "Zack" Merchant: Qaabir's reincarnation, Saira's forced fiancé
- Varun Sharma as Radha Chembare, Shiv's childhood friend
- Vikas Verma as Manav Mehta, Saira's former boyfriend
- Irrfan Khan as Narrator
- Geeta Agarwal Sharma as Gurmeet Kaur
- Rajkummar Rao as Muwwaqit (Mohak)
- Deepika Padukone in a special appearance in the song "Raabta"

== Production ==
=== Casting ===
Alia Bhatt was considered to play the lead role opposite Sushant Singh Rajput, but turned down the role due to scheduling conflicts. In December 2015, Asin was approached to play the lead role opposite Rajput, but opted out due to her decision of not acting post marriage. Kriti Sanon was signed on to play the lead female role in the film in February 2016. Rajkummar Rao was confirmed to make a guest appearance.

=== Filming ===
Principal photography began in February 2016. A major part of filming took place in Budapest. The film's title song ''Raabta'' was shot at the Tata Castle in Tata, Hungary which featured Deepika Padukone.

=== Plagiarism allegations ===
The film's producers, Dinesh Vijan, Homi Adajania, and T-Series received a legal notice from Allu Aravind, the producer of Magadheera. On 8 June 2017, the courts ruled in favour of the film.

== Reception ==
=== Critical response ===
Bollywood Hungama gave the film 3.5/5 stars, writing "Raabta is a well enacted drama with beautiful locales and potent cinematography. It should be in your watch list if you like plots centred around romance, fantasy and reincarnation". The Times of India gave the film 3.5/5 stars, writing "If sparks flew more organically, it would have been easier to make a connection with this epic tale of love." Koimoi gave the film 2/5 stars, writing "Raabta is a confused film that never establishes a firm balance between its crossover love stories." Shubhra Gupta from The Indian Express gave the film 1.5/5 stars, writing, "Some questions arise after Raabta has been seen, chief amongst which is one that comes up every time Bollywood tries, and fails, to do a cracking romance. Why is Bollywood incapable of pulling off a full-length film with a pair of lovers connecting, pulling apart, coming together?" India Today gave the film 1/5 stars, calling it "A comet-crossed romance which never hits the target."

Critic Rajeev Masand gave the film 1/5 stars, writing, "This is a movie so singularly pointless, you have to wonder how the writers and the director tricked the financiers into thinking there was a story here worth telling, and why the actors preferred going to shoot every morning instead of sleeping longer hours. This is the kind of film that film critics must endure so you don't have to. Even Denzel Washington couldn't save this film. I'm going with one out of five."

=== Box office ===
In its opening weekend, the film collected ₹159.3 million domestically. The film made a lifetime collection of ₹256.7 million in India, and a worldwide gross collection of ₹ 390.5 million.

== Soundtrack ==
Raabta

Soundtrack album by Pritam, JAM8 and Meet Bros
- Released: 3 June 2017
- Genre: Feature film soundtrack
- Length: 30:46
- Language: Hindi
- Label: T-Series
- Producers: Pritam; JAM8; Meet Bros

Official audio
- Raabta - Full Album on YouTube

The film's soundtrack was composed by Pritam, JAM8 and Meet Bros with the lyrics written by Amitabh Bhattacharya, Irshad Kamil and Kumaar. The first track "Ik Vaari Aa" sung by Arijit Singh was released on 21 April 2017. The second track "Raabta" (Title Track) is a remake of the 2012 film Agent Vinod's "Raabta (Kehte Hain Khuda)" by Irshad Kamil, and by original makers, Amitabh Bhattacharya and Pritam, sung by Arijit Singh (who had also the original) and Nikhita Gandhi and were released on 2 May 2017. The third song, "Sadda Move," sung by Diljit Dosanjh and Pardeep Singh Sran and rapped by Raftaar was released on 9 May 2017. The fourth song, titled "Lambiyaan Si Judaiyaan", sung by Singh, Shadab Faridi and Altamash Faridi, was released on 18 May 2017. The fifth track of the film "Main Tera Boyfriend" is a remake of the 2007 album Punjabi Blockbuster, song "Girl Friend Boy Friend" sung by Gopal Sharma, written by Kumaar and composed by Sohrabuddin and Sourav Roy, was recreated for this film and was released on 22 May 2017. The sixth and the last song titled "Darasal" voiced by Atif Aslam was released on 1 June 2017. Music director Pritam gave his credit to his launched band JAM8 due to creative differences with producers. He clarified that he wants to work as a solo composer by posting a status on Facebook. The soundtrack consisted of 7 songs and was released on 3 June 2017.

Track listing
No.	Title	Lyrics	Music	Singer(s)	Length
1.	"Ik Vaari Aa"	Amitabh Bhattacharya	Pritam	Arijit Singh	4:34
2.	"Raabta" (Title Track)	Amitabh Bhattacharya, Irshad Kamil	Pritam	Arijit Singh, Nikhita Gandhi	4:57
3.	"Sadda Move"	Amitabh Bhattacharya, Irshad Kamil	Pritam	Diljit Dosanjh, Pardeep Singh Sran, Raftaar	3:31
4.	"Lambiyaan Si Judaiyaan"	Amitabh Bhattacharya	JAM8	Arijit Singh, Shadaab Faridi, Altamash Faridi	3:58
5.	"Main Tera Boyfriend"	Kumaar	Meet Bros	Arijit Singh, Neha Kakkar, Meet Bros	4:36
6.	"Darasal"	Irshad Kamil	JAM8	Atif Aslam	4:34
7.	"Ik Vaari Aa" (Reprise Version)	Amitabh Bhattacharya	Pritam	Jubin Nautiyal	4:34
Total length:					30:46

== Accolades ==
Award Ceremony	Category	Recipient	Result	Ref.(s)
10th Mirchi Music Awards	Album of The Year	Pritam, JAM8, Irshad Kamil, Amitabh Bhattacharya, Kumaar	Nominated	
