= Neha Kakkar =

Indian singer (born 1988)

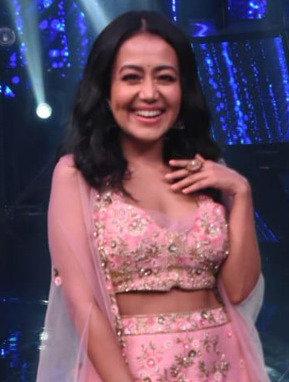
- Kakkar in 2020
- Born: 6 June 1988 (age 38); Rishikesh, Uttar Pradesh, (present-day Uttarakhand), India
- Occupation: Singer
- Years active: 2006–present
- Spouse: Rohanpreet Singh (m. 2020)
- Relatives: Sonu Kakkar (sister); Tony Kakkar (brother)
- Musical career
- Genres: Pop; film
- Instrument: Vocals
- Labels: T-Series; Zee Music Company; Sony Music India; Desi Music Factory; Tips Industries

YouTube information
- Channel: Neha Kakkar
- Years active: 2011–present
- Genres: Entertainment; music
- Subscribers: 15.3 M
- Views: 2.66 billion
- Last updated: 2 March 2026

Neha Kakkar Singh (pronounced [ˈneːɦɑː ˈkəkːəɾ]; née Kakkar; born 6 June 1988) is an Indian singer. She is the younger sister of playback singers Tony Kakkar and Sonu Kakkar. She began performing at an early age at religious events. In 2005, she participated in the second season of the singing reality show, Indian Idol. She made her Bollywood debut as a chorus singer in the film Meerabai Not Out. She rose to prominence with the release of the dance track "Second Hand Jawaani" from Cocktail (2012), which was followed by several popular party songs, including "Sunny Sunny" from Yaariyan and "London Thumakda" from the soundtrack album of the film Queen (2014). Apart from playback singing, Kakkar has appeared in several music videos and as a judge on several television reality shows, including Indian Idol.

In 2019, Kakkar was listed among the most-viewed female artists on YouTube with 13.9 billion views. In January 2021, she became the first Indian singer to win a YouTube Diamond Award. She is the most followed female Indian artist and 22nd most followed artist globally on Spotify.

She appeared in the Forbes India Celebrity 100 in 2017 and 2019. In December 2020, she appeared on the list of Asia's 100 Digital Stars by Forbes.

== Early life ==
Kakkar was born on 6 June 1988, in Rishikesh in the state of Uttar Pradesh (now Uttarakhand). In the early 1990s, Kakkar along with her family, moved to Delhi to try her luck at singing. Kakkar, at the age of four, started performing at local gatherings and religious event. In 2004, she moved to Mumbai along with her brother, Tony Kakkar.

== Career ==
=== 2005–2012: Career beginnings and breakthrough with Cocktail ===
In 2005, she participated in the second season of the singing reality show Indian Idol, in which she was eliminated early.

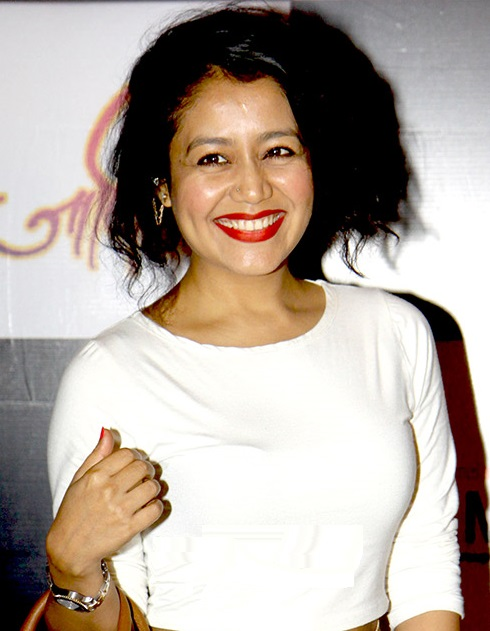
Kakkar at the premiere event of Marathi film Janiva, 2015

In 2008, she launched her debut album, Neha The Rockstar with music by Meet Bros. Anjjan. During this time, she recorded for a music album, Romeo Juliet composed by her brother, Tony Kakkar. She sang "Hai Rama" from Meerabai Not Out (2008) along with Sukhwinder Singh. The following year, she was featured in A.R. Rahman's composition, the theme song of Blue (2009), where she provided the chorus vocals for the song. She then lent her voice for the title track of the Hindi-language soap opera Na Aana Is Des Laado (2009).

In 2010, Kakkar made her screen debut with Vidhi Kasliwal's film Isi Life Mein...! (2010) in which she played the role of a college student. The same year, she debuted in both the Kannada and Telugu music industry by performing a total of four tracks for Sandeep Chowta. She lent her voice for the title track of the Kannada film Thamassu and the song "Nodu Baare" alongside Master Saleem. The former resulted in her only Filmfare Awards South nomination as the Best Female Playback Singer.

She appeared in the second season of Comedy Circus Ke Taansen alongside Kapil Sharma and Ali Asgar. The following year, her collaboration with Pritam for the dance track "Second Hand Jawaani" from Cocktail proved to be a major breakthrough for Kakkar. The song went to become popular among the music listeners, though it received mixed to negative reviews from critics. In 2012, she released "SRK Anthem" on YouTube, which was a tribute to actor Shah Rukh Khan.

=== 2013–2016: Chart-busters with Fever and Baar Baar Dekho ===
Kakkar's first release of 2013, "Botal Khol" from Prague, was met with controversy, as the Central Board of Film Certification raised objections on the song, citing that its lyrics contain double-meaning phrases. This was followed by a Sachin–Jigar's item number composed for Ramaiya Vastavaiya, titled "Jadoo Ki Jhappi". She collaborated with Pritam for another item song, "Dhating Nach", performed alongside Nakash Aziz and Shefali Alvares, for the film Phata Poster Nikhla Hero.

2014 saw the rise of Kakkar with the release of three popular songs. The first release of the year was a collaboration with Yo Yo Honey Singh for the film Yaariyan. The duo collaborated once again for Bollywood's first trance number, "Manali Trance" from The Shaukeens. Her first work with Amit Trivedi, a wedding song titled "London Thumakda" was released in the same year and received positive reviews from critics. On the occasion of Mother's Day, Kakkar shot and released a song for her mother which gained a positive response among the audience.

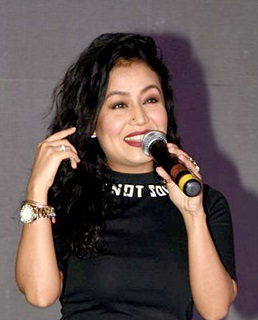
Kakkar at the audio release event of Fever, 2016

Kakkar's first release of 2015 came with "Ek Do Teen Chaar" from Ek Paheli Leela which was composed, penned and co-sung by Tony Kakkar. She then collaborated with the music composer duo, Amjad-Nadeem where she performed the tracks "Naughty No 1" and "Daaru Peeke Dance" for Barkhaa and Kuch Kuch Locha Hai respectively Kakkar sang the Meet Bros-composed "Tu Issaq Mera" from Hate Story 3. Her last release of the year was "Tukur Tukur" from Dilwale, along with Arijit Singh, Kanika Kapoor, Siddharth Mahadevan and Nakash Aziz. The same year, she featured alongside Shilpa Shetty in the music video for the single "Wedding Da Season", composed by Amaal Malik.

In 2016, she performed the popular song "Mile Ho Tum" from the film Fever, composed, written, and co-sung by Tony Kakkar. Then credited as the most-viewed Bollywood song on YouTube, the song received a positive response from critics and audiences. Also, she contributed to the soundtrack album of Baar Baar Dekho by performing the wedding-song "Kala Chashma" which became the "party anthem of the year". She worked with Epic Bhangra for the film Sanam Re, where they released the song "Humne Pee Rakhi Hai", a mix of club and EDM. She also provided her vocals for an additional song in the album, "Akkad Bakkad", a rap song performed along with Badshah. Apart from lending her vocals to the party song, "Kar Gayi Chull" from Kapoor & Sons, which was a remake of the Haryanvi track "Chull" and her first recording for Dharma Productions, Kakkar performed several other recreations during the year including, "Maahi Ve", a remake of the song "Maahi Ve" from Kaante (2002) and "O Janiya", a remake of the song "Kaante Nahi Kat Te" from Mr. India (1987), for Wajah Tum Ho and Force 2 respectively.

=== 2017–present: Collaboration with Tanishk Bagchi and series of remade songs ===
2017 marked Kakkar's first of many collaborations with Tanishk Bagchi which resulted in the rehashing of several Bollywood songs in the coming years. From this year on, Kakkar, primarily, in collaboration with Tanishk Bagchi, became more associated with the trend of remaking old to very recent songs, which resulted in significant backlash targeted for the singer. Their first release, "Badri Ki Dulhania" from Badrinath Ki Dulhania performed with Dev Negi, Ikka and Monali Thakur have few segments lifted from the Shankar-Jaikishen classic, "Chalat Musafir" from Teesri Kasam (1966). The version became an instant chart-buster among the audience and was included in the list of most-viewed Indian videos on YouTube with over 500 million views. This was followed by another chart-buster by the duo, "Cheez Badi" from Machine, a recreation of the 1994-released Mohra song "Tu Cheez Badi Hai Mast Mast", which got mixed reviews from critics.

Her next release was the dance song "Main Tera Boyfriend" from Raabta, which was a recreation of a non-film track "Na Na Na Na". The trend was carried forward with Judwaa 2 where she performed new renditions of two songs, co-composed by Sandeep Shirodkar and Anu Malik and one original song composed by Meet Bros. During the year, she appeared as a judge alongside Himesh Reshammiya and Javed Ali in the sixth season of the Indian television music competition, Sa Re Ga Ma Pa Li'l Champs. The year ended with another recreated song, "Mehbooba" from Fukrey Returns, originally performed by Mohammed Rafi for Dharam Veer (1977).

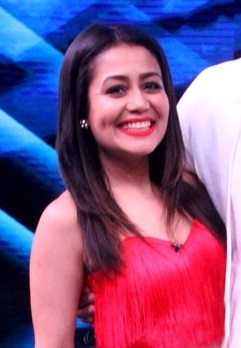
Kakkar on the show High Fever, 2018

Kakkar's first release of 2018 was Yo Yo Honey Singh's "Chhote Chhote Peg" from Sonu Ke Titu Ki Sweety, a remake of the Anand Raj Anand-composition "Tote Tote Ho Gaya" from Bichhoo (2000). This was followed by Bagchi's recreation of "Aashiq Banaya Aapne" included in the soundtrack album of Hate Story 4, originally performed by Himesh Reshammiya and Shreya Ghoshal. The duo collaborated on five other projects, out of which "Dilbar" from Satyameva Jayate and "Aankh Maarey" from Simmba became popular with music listeners, with both songs reaching the list of most-viewed Indian videos on YouTube and the former being the first Indian song to reach number three on the Billboard YouTube Music Chart. Apart from rendering the folk pop song "Dholida" from Loveyatri alongside Udit Narayan and Palak Muchhal, Kakkar performed a traditional-themed-contemporary Punjabi track, "Bhangra Da Sajda" from Veere Di Wedding, composed and co-sung by Shashwat Sachdev. The trend continued with the item song "Gali Gali" included in the Hindi-dubbed version of the Kannada film K.G.F: Chapter 1. During the year, she appeared as a judge alongside Anu Malik and Vishal Dadlani in the tenth season of the Indian television music competition, Indian Idol.

In 2019, she began her year with the release of three remade songs in collaboration with Bagchi, starting with "Chamma Chamma", recreated for the film Fraud Saiyyan, which was originally composed for the film China Gate (1998), followed by Coca Cola from Luka Chuppi and "Hauli Hauli" from De De Pyaar De. The year marked her first collaboration with Vishal Mishra and Vishal–Shekhar, performinf the female version of "Ki Honda Pyaar" from Jabariya Jodi with Mishra and "The Hook Up Song", from Student of the Year 2 with the duo, which was well received by critics. The trio of Kakkar, Bagchi and dancer Nora Fatehi re-united for two other chart-busters, "O Saki Saki" from Batla House and "Ek Toh Kum Zindagani" from Marjaavaan. The former being a remake of "Saaki", from the film Musafir, was originally performed by Sukhwinder Singh and Sunidhi Chauhan. During the same year, Kakkar lent her voice for "Dheeme Dheeme", composed by Bagchi and the romantic love song "Tu Hi Yaar Mera", composed by Rochak Kohli.

On 12 December 2021, Kakkar performed at the Jubilee Stage at Expo 2020 in Dubai, UAE.

In 2022, she sang fewer number of songs compared to previous years. She sang "Mud Mud Ke" with Tony Kakkar, "Baarish Mein Tum" with her husband Rohanpreet Singh and a few other non-film songs. For the movie Govinda Naam Mera, Kakkar sang the song "Bijli" with Mika Singh.

== Plagiarism allegations ==
Neha Kakkar and her brother Tony Kakkar have been accused of plagiarising lyrics, visuals, and harmony from various Indian classics on multiple occasions like Kavita Krishnamurti's "Tu Cheez Badi Hai Mast Mast" and "Tip Tip Barsa Paani", Himesh Reshammiya's "Aashiq Banaya Aapne", Falguni Pathak's "Yaad Piya Ki Aane Lagi", Lata Mangeshkar's "Kaanta Laga", Alka Yagnik's "Chamma Chamma", Poornima's part of "Chalti Hai Kya 9 Se 12", Payal Dev's "Sawan Me Lag Gayi Aag", among several others.

Most recently, she remixed Indian classic singer Falguni Pathak's "Maine Payal Hai Chhankai"(1999) and remade a version named "O Sajna", which received backlash from the audience as well as Pathak. Kakkar has addressed these allegations online, claiming that "people were unhappy seeing her happy and successful".

== Artistry and image ==
Her voice has been described several times in the media as "distinct", "chirpy", "seductive" and "partially nasal".

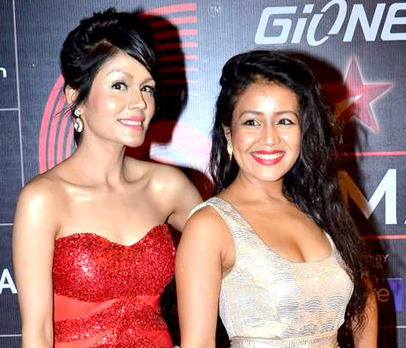
Sonu Kakkar (left) has significantly influenced Neha Kakkar (right) and her music

Kakkar admits that she has always looked up to her elder sister Sonu, as her singing inspiration and she "guides me on how to sing particular songs". She named her brother Tony as a constant pillar of strength.

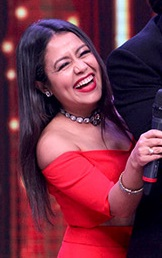
The public describes Kakkar as a "bubbly" person

Kakkar is very active on social media platforms including Instagram, Twitter, Facebook and YouTube page. In October 2019, she received the Instagram trophy, celebrating the first Indian musician and the fifth Indian to reach the milestone.

In 2017, Kakkar was included in the list of 35 boldest entrepreneurs of India who are changing the game in various industries. The same year she appeared in the Forbes Celebrity 100, a list based on income and popularity of India's celebrities. She was listed at the sixty-fourth spot in 2017 and twenty-ninth spot in 2019. In 2019, Kakkar was listed on position second among the most-viewed female artists on YouTube with 4.2 billion views worldwide.

In December 2020, she appeared in the list of Asia's 100 Digital Stars by Forbes. That same month, she launched an exclusive Masterclass for the aspiring singers with FrontRow.

== Personal life ==
Kakkar was in a romantic relationship with actor Himansh Kohli since 2014. In September 2018, they officially announced their relationship on national television and revealed that they were planning to tie the knot soon. However, three months later, an Instagram post by Kakkar revealed that the couple broke-up.

Kakkar met Punjabi musical artist Rohanpreet Singh in Chandigarh for the first time and they soon fell in love. On 24 October 2020, they got married in a Gurdwara in New Delhi.

== Awards ==
Year	Ceremony	Category	Nominated Song	Film	Result	Ref.
2011
2016	3rd PTC Punjabi Music Awards	Best Duo / Group	"Pyaar Te Jaguar" (Shared with Harshit Tomar)		Nominated	
2017	4th PTC Punjabi Music Awards	Best Duet Vocalist	"Patt Lainge" (Shared with Gippy Grewal)		Won	
2017	9th Mirchi Music Awards	Listener's Choice Album Of The Year	"Naina"	Dangal	Won	
2017	10th Mirchi Music Awards	Female Vocalist of The Year	"Badri Ki Dulhania"	Badrinath Ki Dulhania	Nominated	
2018	Brit Asia TV Music Awards	Bollywood Track of the Year	"Dilbar"	Satyameva Jayate	Won	
2019	Zee Cine Awards 2019	Viewers’ Choice Song of the Year	"Aankh Maarey" (Shared with Tanshiq Bagchi)	Simmba	Won	
2020	12th Mirchi Music Awards	Social Media Icon	Special Award / NA	NA	Won	
2020	PTC Punjabi Music Awards	Best Duet Vocalist	"Sorry" (Shared with Maninder Buttar)	NA	Won	
2022	67th Filmfare Awards	Best Playback Singer Female	"Matlabi Yaariyan"	Girl on the Train	Nominated	

== Filmography ==
=== Film ===
Year	Title	Role	Notes	Ref.
2010	Isi Life Mein...!	Sam		
2016	Tum Bin II	Herself	Special appearance in song "Nachna Aaonda Nahin"	
2020	Jai Mummy Di	Herself	Special appearance in song "Lamborghini"	
2020	Ginny Weds Sunny	Herself	Special appearance in song "Sawan Mein Lag Gayi Aag"	
2021	Tuesdays and Fridays	Herself	Special appearance in the song "Phone Mein"	

=== Television ===
Year	Title	Role
2006	Indian Idol – Season 2	Contestant
2008	Jo Jeeta Wohi Super Star – Season 1	Challenger
2011	Comedy Circus Ke Taansen	Various characters
2017	Sa Re Ga Ma Pa Li'l Champs 2017	Judge
2018	Indian Idol – Season 10	Judge
2019	Indian Idol – Season 11	Judge
2019	Khatra Khatra Khatra	Guest Contestant
2020	Indian Idol — Season 12	Judge
2021	Kaun Banega Crorepati	Guest Contestant
2022	Indian Idol – Season 13	Judge
2024	Superstar Singer — Season 3	Judge
2026	Tum Ho Naa - Ghar Ki Superstar	Guest
2026	What Women Want - Season 6	Guest
2026	I-Popstar - Volume 2	Mentor / Judge

== Selected discography ==
- "Second Hand Jawaani" – Cocktail (2012)
- "Sunny Sunny" – Yaariyan (2014)
- "London Thumakda" – Queen (2014)
- "Kar Gayi Chull" – Kapoor & Sons (2016)
- "Mile Ho Tum" – Fever (2016)
- "Kala Chashma" – Baar Baar Dekho (2016)
- "Badri Ki Dulhania" – Badrinath Ki Dulhania (2017)
- "Cheez Badi" – Machine (2017)
- Main Tera Boyfriend - Raabta (2017)
- "Dilbar" – Satyameva Jayate (2018)
- "Aankh Maarey" – Simmba (2018)
- "Coca Cola" – Luka Chuppi (2019)
- "O Saki Saki" – Batla House (2019)
- "Ek Toh Kum Zindagani" – Marjaavaan (2019)
- "Garmi" – Street Dancer 3D (2020)
- "Lamborghini"- Jai Mummy Di (2020)
- "Matlabi Yaariyan"- The Girl on the Train (2021)
- "Moon Calling" (with Gur Sidhu) (2025)

== See also ==
- List of Indian playback singers
