= Jogajog =

Jogajog may refer to:

- Jogajog (novel), a 1929 novel by Rabindranath Tagore
- Jogajog (2015 film), a Bengali film adaptation of the novel
- Jogajog (1988 film), a Bangladeshi drama film
