= Leena Gangopadhyay =

Indian writer, producer, and director

Chairperson of West Bengal Commission for Women

Personal details
- Born: Kolkata
- Children: Arka Ganguly
- Education: University of Calcutta
- Profession: Film producer; writer

Leena Gangopadhyay is an Indian writer, producer, and director, primarily associated with the Tollywood film industry. As of January 2024, she serves as the Chairperson of West Bengal Commission for Women.

She is one of the founders of Kolkata based production company Magic Moments Motion Pictures along with Saibal Banerjee. She is also a director, script and story writer in Organinc Studios, owned by her son Arka Ganguly.

However, After 9 years as a chief of West Bengal Commission for Women, in May 2026, she officially resigned from the post ahead of widespread controversy in the Bengali film industry after the tragic accidental drowning of actor Rahul Arunoday Banerjee during filming of Bhole Baba Par Karega. The incident drew criticism from industry technicians and actors regarding workplace safety and accountability, which prompted her decision to step down to ensure a transparent investigation. Her departure also coincided with a major political transition in the state following the 2026 Assembly elections as BJP win over Trinamool Congress in West Bengal.

== Works ==
=== Films ===
Year	Film	Role	Ref
2003	Bhalo Theko	Writer	
2018	Maati	Co-Director and producer	
2019	Sanjhbati	Co-director	
Postponed	Khelaghor	Co-director	

=== Television ===
Leena Gangopadhyay is the script writer for popular Bengali serials including 'Ishti Kutum', and 'Andarmahal'.She has also co-directed two Bengali films 'Maati' (Earth) and 'Sanjhbati' (Evening light).

Her serials have been remade in multiple regional Indian languages. 'Sreemoyee' written by Gangopadhyay was made in Hindi (as Anupama), Kannada (as Inthi Nimma Asha), Marathi (as Aai Kuthe Kay Karte), Malayalam (as Kudumbavilakku), Telugu (as Intinti Gruhalakshmi), Tamil (as Baakiyalakshmi). Yet another serial written by Leena Gangopadhyay 'Mohor' was remade in Kannada as 'Sarasu', Hindi as 'Shaurya Aur Anokhi Ki Kahani', Malayalam as ‘Koodevide', Marathi as ‘Swabhiman – Shodh Astitvacha’, Tamil as 'Kaatrukkenna Veli’ and Telugu as 'Guppedantha Manasu'.

While Leena Gangopadhyay's serials have been popular, controversy has not been far behind. She has been criticised and trolled on social media for writing stories that are regressive, called to end a few of the serials with reasons cited including lack of originality in storyline, repetitiveness in plot, the negative influence on society like the serial Guddi and lack of sensitivity in portrayal of a community or people like Ishti Kutum. However, Gangopadhyay, believes that we cannot call the serials progressive or regressive. In an interview with The Telegraph, she said “Writing for television is very different from writing novels. An author can be selfish but a scriptwriter will always have to keep her audience in mind. Television is after all a reflection of society. You cannot deny what exists in society. Regressive points of view exist. That is why we have them in television serials”.

Since 2023, on Indian Bengali TV, Magic Moments Motion Pictures produces serials exclusively for Star Jalsha, whereas Organinc Studios produces exclusively for Zee Bangla.

==== Formerly broadcast ====
Series	Role	Network	First aired	Language	Last aired	Episodes	Production House	Remakes	Ref
Shonar Horin	Writer	ETV Bangla	2004	Bengali	2009	—N/a			
Binni Dhaner Khoi	Writer	ETV Bangla	31 August 2009	Bengali	16 March 2013	1108	Magic Moments Motion Pictures		
Saat Paake Bandha	Writer	Zee Bangla	5 July 2010	Bengali	20 July 2013	956	One Plus One		
Keya Patar Nouko	Writer	Zee Bangla	14 February 2011	Bengali	26 October 2013	844	Magic Moments Motion Pictures		
Ishti Kutum	Writer	Star Jalsha	24 October 2011	Bengali	13 December 2015	1332	Magic Moments Motion Pictures	Hindi	
Jol Nupur	Writer	Star Jalsha	21 January 2013	Bengali	5 December 2015	901	Magic Moments Motion Pictures		
Hiyar Maajhe	Writer	ETV Bangla	16 September 2013	Bengali	13 December 2014	381	Magic Moments Motion Pictures		
Chokher Tara Tui	Writer	Star Jalsha	24 March 2014	Bengali	24 July 2016	793	Magic Moments Motion Pictures		
Kojagori	Writer	Zee Bangla	2 February 2015	Bengali	13 February 2016	328	Magic Moments Motion Pictures		
Ichche Nodee	Writer	Star Jalsha	15 June 2015	Bengali	28 May 2017	712	Magic Moments Motion Pictures	Hindi	
Punyi Pukur	Writer	Star Jalsha	7 December 2015	Bengali	28 May 2017	491	Magic Moments Motion Pictures		
Ei Chheleta Bhelbheleta	Writer	Zee Bangla	28 March 2016	Bengali	23 July 2017	478	Magic Moments Motion Pictures		
Kusum Dola	Writer	Star Jalsha	22 August 2016	Bengali	3 September 2018	731	Magic Moments Motion Pictures	Hindi	
Kundo Phuler Mala	Writer	Star Jalsha	29 May 2017	Bengali	18 March 2018	293	Magic Moments Motion Pictures		
Andarmahal	Writer	Zee Bangla	5 June 2017	Bengali	9 November 2018	366	Magic Moments Motion Pictures		
Gachkouto	Writer	Colors Bangla	26 June 2017	Bengali	11 November 2017	113	Magic Moments Motion Pictures		
Adbhuture	Writer	Zee Bangla	31 July 2017	Bengali	6 October 2017	50	Magic Moments Motion Pictures		
Sanyashi Raja	Writer	Star Jalsha	11 September 2017	Bengali	15 July 2018	306	Magic Moments Motion Pictures		
Phagun Bou	Writer	Star Jalsha	19 March 2018	Bengali	29 December 2019	534	Magic Moments Motion Pictures		
Mayurpankhi	Writer	Star Jalsha	12 November 2018	Bengali	22 September 2019	308	Magic Moments Motion Pictures		
Nakshi Kantha	Writer	Zee Bangla	12 November 2018	Bengali	10 July 2020	383	Magic Moments Motion Pictures		
Sreemoyee	Writer	Star Jalsha	10 June 2019	Bengali	19 December 2021	834	Magic Moments Motion Pictures	Hindi, Tamil, Marathi, Kannada, Malayalam, Telugu, Odia	
Jiyonkathi	Writer	Sun Bangla	23 September 2019	Bengali	18 April 2021	486	Organinc Studios		
Mohor	Writer	Star Jalsha	28 October 2019	Bengali	3 April 2022	783	Magic Moments Motion Pictures	Hindi, Tamil, Marathi, Kannada, Malayalam, Telugu	
Kora Pakhi	Writer	Star Jalsha	13 January 2020	Bengali	1 January 2021	205	Magic Moments Motion Pictures		
Khorkuto	Writer	Star Jalsha	17 August 2020	Bengali	21 August 2022	715	Magic Moments Motion Pictures		
Desher Maati	Writer	Star Jalsha	4 January 2021	Bengali	31 October 2021	297	Magic Moments Motion Pictures		
Dhulokona	Writer	Star Jalsha	19 July 2021	Bengali	11 December 2022	505	Magic Moments Motion Pictures		
Thoda sa Baadal Thoda sa Paani	Writer	Colors TV	23 August 2021	Hindi	4 March 2022	134	Organinc Studios	Bengali	
Roja	Writer	Enterr10 Bangla	19 September 2021	Bengali	25 January 2022	128	Organinc Studios		
Yeh Rishta Kya Kehlata Hai 3	Writer	StarPlus	27 October 2021	Hindi	5 November 2023	697	Director's Kut Productions		
Kabhi Kabhie Ittefaq Sey	Writer	StarPlus	3 January 2022	Hindi	20 August 2022	198	Cockcrow Entertainment Shaika Films Magic Moments Motion Pictures		
Sona Roder Gaan	Writer	Colors Bangla	24 January 2022	Bengali	27 November 2022	306	Organinc Studios		
Guddi	Writer	Star Jalsha	28 February 2022	Bengali	7 September 2023	552	Magic Moments Motion Pictures		
Ekka Dokka	Writer	Star Jalsha	18 July 2022	Bengali	24 September 2023	430	Magic Moments Motion Pictures		
Icche Putul	Writer	Zee Bangla	30 January 2023	Bengali	9 March 2024	326	Organinc Studios		
Balijhor	Writer	Star Jalsha	6 February 2023	Bengali	16 April 2023	70	Magic Moments Motion Pictures		
Kar Kachhe Koi Moner Kotha	Writer	Zee Bangla	3 July 2023	Bengali	21 June 2024	333	Organinc Studios		
Jol Thoi Thoi Bhalobasha	Writer	Star Jalsha	25 September 2023	Bengali	16 June 2024	261	Magic Moments Motion Pictures		
Yeh Rishta Kya Kehlata Hai 4	Writer	StarPlus	6 November 2023	Hindi	21 May 2025		Director's Kut Productions		
Badal Sesher Pakhi	Creative Producer	Sun Bangla	13 November 2023	Bengali	30 June 2024	231	Magic Moments Motion Pictures		
Jhanak	Writer	StarPlus	20 November 2023	Hindi	31 May 2026	923	Magic Moments Motion Pictures		
Mithijhora	Writer	Zee Bangla	27 November 2023	Bengali	13 July 2025	418	Organinc Studios		
Ashtami	Writer	Zee Bangla	8 April 2024	Bengali	23 June 2024	77	Organinc Studios		
Roshnai	Writer	Star Jalsha	25 April 2024	Bengali	20 July 2025	445	Magic Moments Motion Pictures		
Puber Moyna	Writer	Zee Bangla	24 June 2024	Bengali	19 April 2025	277	Organinc Studios		
Kajol Nodir Jole	Writer	Zee Bangla	12 August 2024	Bengali	9 November 2024	78	Organinc Studios		
Durga – Atoot Prem Kahani	Writer	Colors TV	16 September 2024	Hindi	5 January 2025	112	Magic Moments Motion Pictures		
Iss Ishq Ka Rabb Rakha	Writer	StarPlus	16 September 2024	Hindi	20 April 2025	225	Magic Moments Motion Pictures		
Chiroshokha	Writer	Star Jalsha	27 January 2025	Bengali	8 April 2026	432	Magic Moments Motion Pictures		
Bade Ghar Ki Choti Bahu	Writer	Dangal TV	16 June 2025	Hindi	24 January 2026	192	Organinc Studios		
Ishani	Writer	StarPlus	3 July 2025	Hindi	28 October 2025	114	Magic Moments Motion Pictures		
Kone Dekha Alo	Writer	Zee Bangla	25 August 2025	Bengali	21 September 2026	285	Organinc Studios		
Bhole Baba Par Kare Ga	Writer	Star Jalsha	15 September 2025	Bengali	7 April 2026	201	Magic Moments Motion Pictures		
Taara	Writer	StarPlus	10 March 2026	Hindi	7 May 2026	58	Magic Moments Motion Pictures		
Sairaab	Writer	StarPlus	2 June 2026	Hindi	22 September 2026	113	Magic Moments Motion Pictures		

=== Books ===
Title	Language
Bhoot Dwadashi	Bengali
Sondhye Raater Tara	Bengali
Ekmutho Sadakori	Bengali
Holud Pakhir Palok	Bengali
Maati	Bengali
Jonmodin	Bengali
