= Rajanya Mitra =

Indian Bengali actress

- Born: Kolkata, West Bengal
- Occupation: Actress
- Known for: Mahua Bose in Nokshi Kantha
- Notable work: Ichche Nodee (2015); Andarmahal (2017); Nokshi Kantha (2018); Khorkuto (2020); Roshnai (2024); Chirosakha (2025); Parineeta (2026)
- Children: 1

Rajanya Mitra (Bengali: রাজন্যা মিত্র) is an Indian actress who works primarily in Bengali language television soap operas and web series.

== Career ==
Rajanya started her acting through the documentary movie, A Journey from Calcutta to Kolkata (2009), directed by Debasis Choudhuri. Thereafter, she continued playing prominent and supporting roles in Bengali soap opera produced by Saibal Banerjee and Leena Gangopadhyay. In 2012, she also played the role of Esha in Checkmate. Some of her well known works includes Mahua Bose in Nokshi Kantha and Mishti in Khorkuto.

== Television ==
- All soap operas are in Bengali language, unless otherwise mentioned.

List of television credits
Year	Title	Role	Channel	Ref.
2009–2010	Ogo Bodhu Sundori	Rojoni	Star Jalsha	
2012	Checkmate	Esha	Star Jalsha	
2015–2017	Ichche Nodee	Kajori Banerjee	Star Jalsha	
2015–2017	Punyi Pukur	Koyel Banerjee	Star Jalsha	
2016–2017	Ei Chheleta Bhelbheleta	Sonali	Zee Bangla	
2017–2018	Sanyashi Raja	Rajkumari Surobala aka Suro	Star Jalsha	
2017–2018	Andarmahal	Shreya Bose	Zee Bangla	
2018–2019	Phagun Bou	Kurchi Ghosh	Star Jalsha	
2018–2019	Mayurpankhi	Shreyashee Lahiri (née Sen) aka Bubu	Star Jalsha	
2018–2020	Nokshi Kantha	Mahua Bose	Zee Bangla	
2019–2022	Mohor	Shramana Roy Chowdhury	Star Jalsha	
2020–2022	Khorkuto	Nabamita Mukherjee aka Mishti	Star Jalsha	
2022–2023	Guddi	Keya	Star Jalsha	
2022	Ekka Dokka	Baisakhi	Star Jalsha	
2023	Balijhor	Kankana Basu	Star Jalsha	
2023–2024	Jol Thoi Thoi Bhalobasha	Anushree Basu	Star Jalsha	
2023–2024	Badal Sesher Pakhi	Usha Mukherjee	Sun Bangla	
2024–2025	Roshnai	Madhabilata	Star Jalsha	
2025–2026	Chirosakha	Kurchi Chatterjee	Star Jalsha	
2025–2026	Bhole Baba Par Kare Ga		Star Jalsha	
2026–Present	Parineeta	Shinjinee Roy; Shirin's mother	Zee Bangla	
2026–Present	Dulari	Nayantara Chowdhury aka Tara; Riddho's mother	Zee Bangla	

== Filmography ==
- A Journey from Calcutta to Kolkata (2009)
- Chhata (2018)

== Awards ==
Year	Title	Category	Role	Show
2018	Zee Bangla Sonar Sansar	Priyo Jaa	Shreya	Andarmahal
2025	Tele Academy Awards	Priyo Nonod	Kurchi	Chirosokha
2026	Star Jalsha Parivaar Awards	Priyo Nonod	Kurchi	Chirosokha
2026	Star Jalsha Parivaar Awards	Priyo Misti Somporko	Kurchi-Komolini	Chirosokha
