= Saheb Chatterjee =

Indian Bengali actor (born 1978)

- Born: Shubraneel Chatterjee; 27 December 1978 (age 47); Kolkata, West Bengal, India
- Occupations: Actor; Playback Singer

Saheb Chatterjee, also spelled as Shaheb Chatterjee and Shaheb Chattopadhay (Bengali: সাহেব চট্টোপাধ‍্যায়), is an Indian Bengali actor, singer and music producer known for his contributions to the Bengali film industry and Bengali television industry.

== Early life ==
Chatterjee was born and brought up in Kolkata, West Bengal. He got trained in Rabindra Sangeet along with occasional Nazrul Geeti and Indian Classical Music lessons at Dakshinee, a music academy in Kolkata. He started his music learning at the age of 7 and continued for 13 years. In 2006, he released his first solo album "Moner Madhuri", a compilation of Tagore songs. In 2008, he released his second album "Amar E Path", which is a compilation of ten Tagore songs.

== Career ==
At the beginning of his career in 2002, Chatterjee acted in several popular televised soap operas, including "Aleya", "Srot", "Tarpor", "Chaand Uthlo", "Thakurbari" (as Prince Dwarakanath Thakur), "Khela" (by Ravi Ojha), "Utshober Ratri" (by Jishu Dasgupta), "Nana Ronger Dinguli", "Jibon Niye Khela", and "Sudhu tomari Jonyo". Chatterjee later gained critical acclaim for his roles in films including Shukno Lanka, Hitlist, 033, Hatyapuri, Colonel, and Laboratory. In 2006, he played the title role in Sree Chaitanya Mahaprabhu, a Hindi film directed by Gufi Pantel.

Chatterjee is also known for his work as a musician, particularly for his renditions of Rabindra Sangeet. Chatterjee is claimed to be the first Bengali singer and actor to have played the role of Swami Vivekananda in the play "Oneness, Voice Without Form" directed by Alex Broun. He gained recognition for his roles in the television series Potol Kumar Gaanwala (2016 — 2017) on Star Jalsa, Goyenda Ginni (2015 — 2016) on Zee Bangla and Sanyashi Raja (2017 — 2018) (playing the title role, the King of Bhawal).

In 2022, Chatterjee played alongside Radhika Apte in a Hindi ZEE5 original film titled Mrs Undercover, directed by Anushree Mehta. He also portrayed the role of Ramiz Sheikh in the ZEE5 web series Black Widows. In 2024, Chatterjee earned accolades for his role as the antagonist in the web series Bijoya on Hoichoi.

Chatterjee has hosted a non-fictional music show "Etv Sa Theke Sa Junior" and presented on different Bengali television channels such as Zee Bangla.

Chatterjee has played in several theatrical performances including: "Rani Creusa" (as King Xethus), "Ferari Fauj" directed by Gyanesh Mukhopadhyay, and "Eh Aboron" directed by Sree Dulal Lahiri. He has performed in numerous theatres in North America, Bangladesh, Australia, and Dubai.

In 2023, Chatterjee was awarded accolades for his performance of Tagore songs in Dubai as part of a show organised by Malhar, an institution for music education. He later performed in a scripted show titled Tagore Meets Tagore, starring Sharmila Tagore.

Chatterjee has appeared in the Bengali television serial Goyenda Ginni, which aired on Zee Bangla, as Dr. Porimal Mitra, the husband of the protagonist Parama Mitra. He featured as singer Sujon Kumar in the serial Potol Kumar Ganwala, which was broadcast on the Indian channel Star Jalsha. He has participated several times in the reality show Dadagiri.

== Web series ==
Year	Web series	Role	Director	Platform	Language	Notes	Ref.
2020	Black Widows	Rameez Sheikh	Birsa Dasgupta	ZEE5	Bengali	Marked his web series debut	
2022	Mukti	Pritanjan Babu	Rohan Ghose	ZEE5	Bengali		
2024	Unishe April	—N/a	Arindam Sil	Fridaay	Bengali		
2024	Bijoya	—N/a	Sayantan Ghosal	Hoichoi	Bengali		
2025	Anusandhan	Narayan Sanyal, an influential political leader	Aditi Roy	Hoichoi	Bengali		

== Filmography ==
Key
†	Denotes films that have not yet been released

- All films are in Bengali-language, unless otherwise mentioned

Year	Film	Role	Notes	Ref.
2005	Bazi			
2006	Andhakarer Shabdo			
2008	Mon Amour: Shesher Kobita Revisited	Amit and Rajarshi	Marked his film debut as the lead actor; He played dual roles in this film	
2008	Shri Chaitanya Mahaprabhu	Chaitanya Mahaprabhu	Marked his debut in a Hindi film; Lead role	
2009	Hitlist			
2010	Shukno Lanka	An upcoming film star		
2010	033			
2012	Hemlock Society	Shantanu		
2013	Goyenda Gogol	Gogol's father		
2013	Colonel	Jayanta		
2014	Bachchan	Dr. Partha Sarathi Chatterjee	Cameo appearance	
2014	Gogoler Kirti	Gogol's father		
2015	Jogajog	Nabin	The film is an adaptation of the novel Jogajog by Rabindranath Tagore	
2016	Love Express	Anando Prasad Ganguly		
2018	Dharasnan			
2019	Gotro	Anirban		
2020	Brahma Janen Gopon Kommoti			
2022	Hridpindo	Somok		
2022	Circus Er Ghora			
2022	Hatyapuri	Bilas Majumdar / Animesh Kumar Sarkar	He played dual roles in this film	
2022	Chhaya Surya		Lead role	
2023	Mrs Undercover'	Durga's husband	Hindi film	
2023	Datta	Bilas		
2024	Lukochuri	Shivangi's father		
2024	Jamalaye Jibonto Bhanu	Debaraj Indra	Film is a tribute to Bhanu Bandopadhyay on his 101st birth anniversary	
2025	Saralakkho Holmes	Chanchal	Film is an adaptation of The Hound of the Baskervilles by Arthur Conan Doyle	
2025	Sonar Kellay Jawker Dhan	Sunil Bhargav	The film is an adaptation of Hemendra Kumar Roy's Bimal-Kumar series and Satyajit Ray's novel Sonar Kella	
2025	Aap Jaisa Koi	Joy Bose	Hindi film released on Netflix	
2025	Mitin: Ekti Khunir Sandhaney		The film is an adaptation of Megher Pore Megh by Suchitra Bhattacharya	
2026	Phool Pishi O Edward	Jogendra Chandra Nandy		

== Discography ==
Year	Song	Film	Album	Language	Notes	Ref.
		Goopy Bagha Phire Elo	—N/a	Bengali		

- Megh Brishti Khela (2008)
- Mon Amour: Shesher Kobita Revisited (2008)
- Avijatrik (2021)
- JE TORE PAGOL BOLE
- Single Album-BHOJO GOURANGO
- SREE KRISHNA 108
- JENE SHUNE BISH KORECHI PAAN- Film: Achena Uttam starring Saswato Chatterjee and Srabonti
- Saregama ALBUM

== Television ==
Year	Soap opera	Role	Network	Language	Notes	Ref.
2015–2016	Goyenda Ginni	Doctor Parimal Mitra - Parama Mitra's husband	Zee Bangla	Bengali		
2015–2017	Potol Kumar Gaanwala	Sujon Kumar Mallick - singer and Potol's father	Star Jalsha	Bengali		
2017–2018	Sanyashi Raja	Rajkumar Ronendro Bardhan Rai and Bimbobti's husband	Star Jalsha	Bengali		
