= Nabanita Malakar =

Bengali television actress

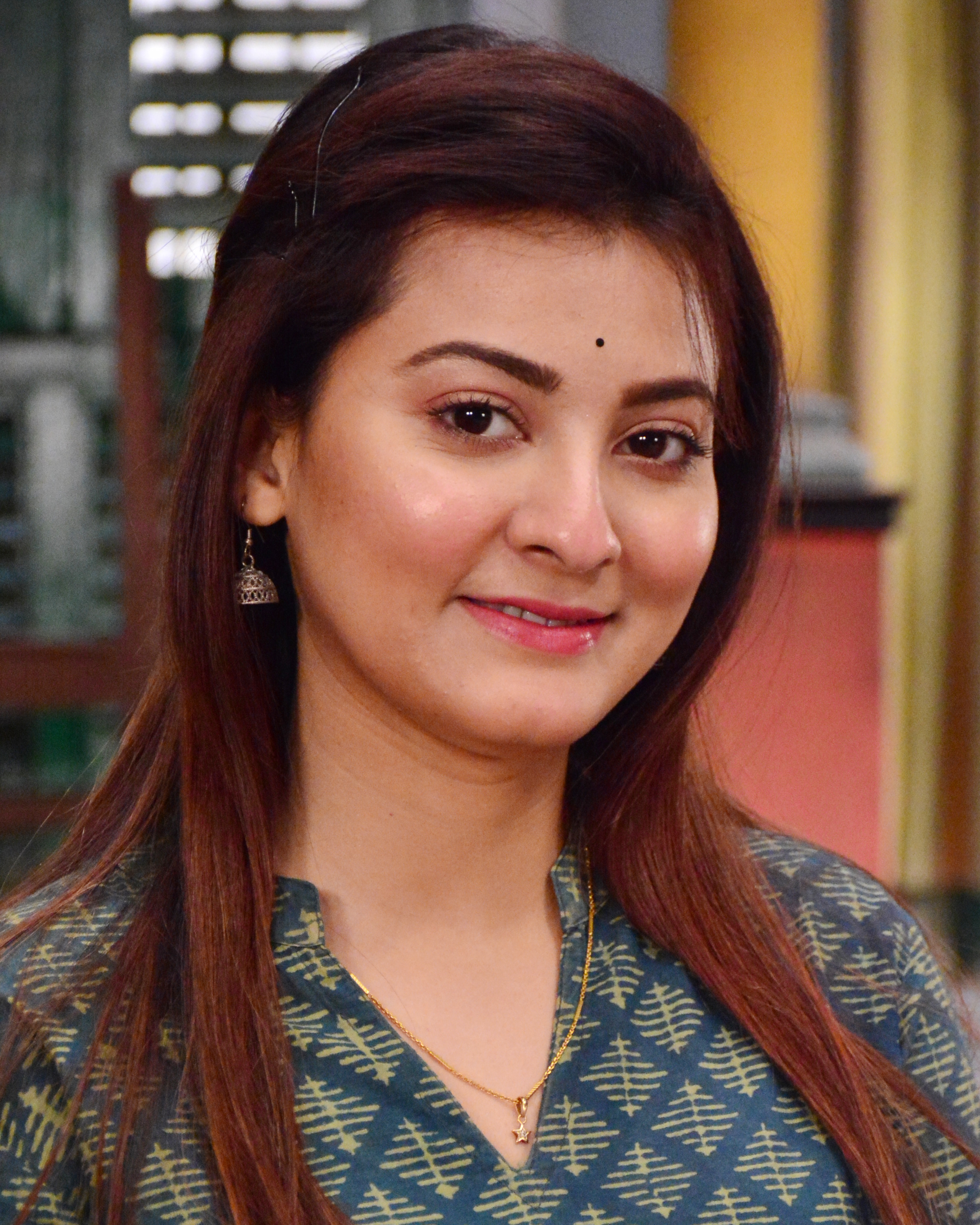
- Malakar in 2024
- Born: Jalpaiguri, West Bengal, India
- Citizenship: Indian
- Occupation: Actress
- Notable work: Aponjon; Ei Chheleta Bhelbheleta; Punyi Pukur; Neem Phooler Madhu

Nabanita Malakar is an Indian Bengali television actress who is known for playing Aishwarya on the TV serial Ei Chheleta Bhelbheleta and Shiuli on the TV serial Aponjon. She has also acted in other popular Bengali serials such as Mangal Chandi, Aponjon, Mahaprabhu Sree Chaitanya, "Punyi Pukur", "Neem Phooler Madhu", "Anurager Chhowa".

== Filmography ==
- Nari Choritro Bejay Jotil (2026)

== Television ==
=== Television ===
Year	Show	Channel	Character	Notes	Production House	References
2015–16	Aponjon	Colors Bangla	Shiuli	Lead role	Surinder Films	
2016–17	Ei Chheleta Bhelbheleta	Zee Bangla	Aishwarya/ Mimi	Main Antagonist	Magic Moments Motion Pictures	
2016–17	Punyi Pukur	Star Jalsha	Aratrika/ Mimi	Supporting role	Magic Moments Motion Pictures	
2018–19	Manasa	Colors Bangla	Saraswati	Supporting role	Subrata Roy Productions	
2018	Mahaprabhu Shri Chaitanya	Colors Bangla	Lokkhipriya	Lead role	Dug Creative Media, Surinder Films	
2019	Arabya Rajani	Colors Bangla	Nafisa	Lead role	Surinder Films	
2019–20	Mangal Chandi	Colors Bangla	Maa Chandi	Lead role	Polarwed Productions LLD	
2019–20	Mahalaya (Mangal Chandi Special)	Colors Bangla	Maa Durga	Lead role	Polarwed Productions LLD	
2021	Sagar Jyoti	Enterr10 Bangla	Jyoti	Lead role	Shree Venkatesh Films	
2023-2024	Neem Phooler Madhu	Zee Bangla	Tinni	Negative	Zee Bangla	
2023–2024	Roopsagore Moner Manush	Sun Bangla	Ragini	Negative	Svf productions	
2024	Anurager Chhowa	Star Jalsha	Charu	Supporting Role	Svf productions	
2025-2026	Chirodini Tumi Je Amar	Zee Bangla	Rohini	Negative Role	Svf productions	
