= Somraj Maity =

Indian actor

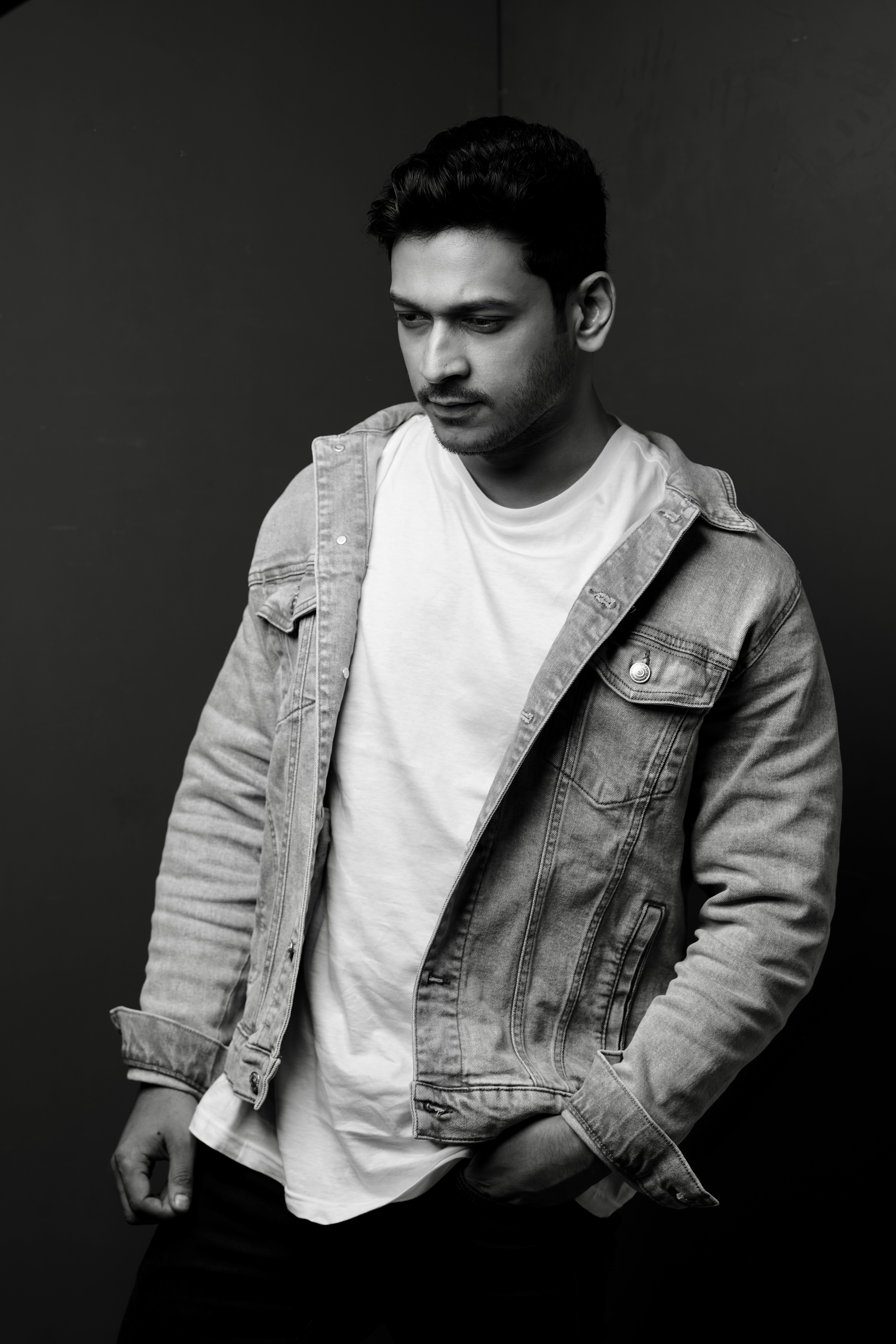
- Born: 4 April 1994 (age 32); Kolkata, West Bengal, India
- Citizenship: Indian
- Occupations: Actor, model
- Years active: 2014–present
- Known for: Ei Chheleta Bhelbheleta

Somraj Maity (born 4 April 1994) is an Indian actor who works in the Bengali film and television industry. He is known for his portrayal of Abir in the TV serial Ei Chheleta Bhelbheleta,Kone Dekha Alo romantic drama series which aired on Zee Bangla. He has also appeared many films .

== Career ==
Maity was an engineer before becoming an actor. He is known for his portrayal of Abir in the TV serial Ei Chheleta Bhelbheleta, a romantic drama series which aired on Zee Bangla. Apart from Ei Chheleta Bhelbheleta, he has also acted in serials such as Tekka Raja Badshah, Kunjochhaya and Jiyon Kathi. He has also worked in films such as Raagini and Cholo Lets Live. In 2018, he appeared in Piya Re, a romantic drama film directed by Abhimanyu Mukherjee.

== Filmography ==
=== Films ===
| Year | Title | Role | Notes | Ref. |
|---|---|---|---|---|
| 2017 | Cholo Let's Live | Arjun | Zee Bangla Originals | |
| 2017 | Raagini | | Zee Bangla Originals | |
| 2017 | Joy Maa Durga | | Zee Bangla Originals | |
| 2018 | Piya Re | Aditya | Directed By Abhimanyu Mukherjee | |
| 2020 | Phire Dekha | | Zee Bangla Originals | |
| 2021 | Shorshephool | | platform 8 | |
| 2024 | Palasher Biye | | ZEE5 | |
| 2025 | Aarii | Pritam Sunpui | Theatrical release | |

=== Television ===
| Year | Title | Role | Channel | Production Company(s) | Language | Notes | References |
|---|---|---|---|---|---|---|---|
| 2014-2015 | Thik Jeno Love Story | Tunir Sengupta | Star Jalsha | Shree Venkatesh Films | Bengali | Supporting role | |
| 2015 | Gouridaan | Bishwanath/ Bishu | Colors Bangla | Shree Venkatesh Films | Bengali | Lead role | |
| 2016-2017 | Ei Chheleta Bhelbheleta | Abir | Zee Bangla | Magic Moments Motion Pictures | Bengali | Lead role | |
| 2017 | Adbhuture | Kingshuk | Zee Bangla | Magic Moments Motion Pictures | Bengali | Episodic role | |
| 2018-2019 | Tekka Raja Badshah | Raja | Star Jalsha | Blues Productions | Bengali | Lead role | |
| 2019-2020 | Kunjochaya | Ishaan | Star Jalsha | Boyhood Productions | Bengali | Lead role | |
| 2020-2021 | Jiyon Kathi | Rishi Sen | Sun Bangla | Magic Moments Motion Pictures | Bengali | Lead role | |
| 2024 | Cheeni | Dron | Star Jalsha | Missing Screw Productions | Bengali | Lead role | |
| 2025–2026 | Kone Dekha Alo | Anubhab | Zee Bangla | Organic Studios | Bengali | Lead role | |

=== Web series ===
| Year | Title | Role | Channel | Notes |
|---|---|---|---|---|
| 2018 | Shei Je Holud Pakhi | | Hoichoi | |
| 2024 | Kaantaye Kaantaye | | ZEE5 | |

== Awards ==
| Year | Award | Category | Role | Serial |
|---|---|---|---|---|
| 2017 | Tele Academy Award | Best Couple | Abir-Shaluk | Ei Chheleta Bhelbheleta |
| 2017 | Zee Bangla Sonar Sansar Award | Priyo Chele | Abir | Ei Chheleta Bhelbheleta |
| 2025 | Tele Academy Award | Priyo Juti | Laju Anubhav | Kone Dekha Alo |
| 2026 | Zee Bangla Sonar Sansar Award | Zee Bangla Jury's Choice Special Award | Laju Anubhav | Kone Dekha Alo |
| 2026 | Anandalok Awards | Best Actor | Anubhab | Kone Dekha Alo |
| 2026 | Anandalok Awards | Best Juti | Anubhab Laju | Kone Dekha Alo |
| 2026 | Tele Cine Awards | Best Actor | Anubhab | Kone Dekha Alo |
