= Dawshodishi Kore Aalo =

2018 music video by Kumar Mukherjee

- Directed by: Souvik Bhattacharjee
- Produced by: RaagReet
- Music by: Kumar Mukherjee
- Release date: 2018

Dawshodishi Kore Aalo is a music video about Durga Puja, produced by RaagReet, the organisation of Hindustani Classical vocalist Kumar Mukherjee. According to sources and journalists, this is going to be the largest ever a project that will be depicting the entire period of Durga Puja, the largest festival of West Bengal. This is also the first video where the veteran actor Soumitra Chatterjee and singer Usha Uthup will be seen in one frame.

The song has been written, composed and sung by vocalist Kumar Mukherjee, the music supervision has been done by Tabla Maestro Bickram Ghosh. Mukherjee states that "after the inclusion of the 'Bickram Ghosh' aspect, the song has been spruced up to a great extent". The music video has been directed by Souvik Bhattacharjee. Reportedly the song is about to release in mid-September 2018 and is under the process of post-production.

== Cast ==
- Soumitra Chatterjee
- Usha Uthup
- Bickram Ghosh
- Jaya Seal Ghosh
- Kumar Mukherjee
- RJ Somak
- RJ Agni
- Somraj of Ei Chheleta Bhelbheleta
- Paean Sarkar
