= Anusandhan =

Anusandhan may refer to:

- Anusandhan (1981 film), an Indian bilingual action thriller film
- Anusandhan (2021 film), an Indian Bengali-language psychological thriller film
- Anusandhan (TV series), an Indian Bengali-language crime thriller web series
