= Tekka Raja Badshah =

- Title Screen
- Genre: Drama; Comedy; Romance
- Created by: Blues Productions
- Written by: Snehashish Chakraborty
- Starring: Yuvraj Chowdhury; Somraj Maity; Soumik Saha
- Opening theme: "Tekka Raja Badsha"
- Composer: Snehasish Chakroborty
- Country of origin: India
- Original language: Bengali
- No. of seasons: 1
- No. of episodes: 237

Production
- Producers: Snehasish Chakroborty; Debasish Chakraborty
- Running time: 21 minutes
- Production company: Blues Productions

Original release
- Network: Star Jalsha
- Release: 16 July 2018 – 17 March 2019

Related
- Sanyashi Raja; Nojor; Amar Akbar Anthony

Tekka Raja Badsha is a Bengali comedy drama television series that premiered on 16 July 2018 on Star Jalsha and streams digitally on JioHotstar. The show stars Yuvraj Chowdhury, Somraj Maity, Soumick Saha, Tonni Laha Roy, Moushumi Priya Debanth and Debachandrima Singha Roy in prominent roles. The show is based on the Amitabh Bachchan-Rishi Kapoor starrer 1977 film Amar Akbar Anthony. It replaced Sanyashi Raja.

== Plot ==
As the paths of three seemingly unrelated young men get tangled by a twist of circumstances – a roller coaster of cat and mouse, and bonding and self-discovery ensue causing utter confusion and chaos with hilarious consequences.

Raja is a fabulous singer but a simple village boy. At times, he is stupid but honest and kind hearted. His naive honesty always lead him to trouble. Badsha, on the other hand, is a righteous and honest police officer. He hates criminals and crimes. Fate plays its trick when Raja meets Tekka the thief. Though Tekka possesses a golden heart, he is a burglar. Tekka, Raja and Badsha seem to be connected by some mystery- mystery that is hidden in their past. This is the story about Tekka, Raja, Badsha and their journey.

== Cast ==
- Yuvraj Chowdhury as Tekka, Darjeeling's love interest and later husband
- Somraj Maity as Raja, Aradhya's love interest and later husband
- Soumik Saha as Badsha, Teer's love interest and later husband
- Moushumi Debnath as Darjeeling, Tekka's love interest and later wife
- Debchandrima Singha Roy as Aradhya, Raja's love interest and later wife
- Tonni Laha Roy as Teer/Gurumaa, Badsha's love interest and later wife
- Gourav Ghoshal as Yug Chowdhury, A Drug Dealer
- Bimal Chakraborty as Dinesh Kumar Dutta
- Nibedita Mukherjee
- Moumita Chakrobarty as Ratri Dutta
- Kotha Chakroborty as Aradhya 's Sister
- Rimjhim Das as Abha Dutta - Aradhya 's Sister
- Sonali Chatterjee as Sonali Chakraborty - Yug's Mother
- Misty Singh
- Riya Ganguly Chakrabarty
- Maitrayee Mitra as Rekha Chakrabarty
- Kaushik Banerjee as SP Paritosh Chakrabarty
- Ratna Ghoshal as Phuli Pishi - Annakali's mother, Dinesh and Gautam's sister.
- Twarita Chatterjee as Annakali - Phuli's daughter.
- Subhashish Mukherjee as Hekka - A pickpocket, Tekka's adoptive father.
- Mitali Bhattacharya as Sarala - Raja's adoptive mother
- Jayanta Banerjee as Kaalu Gonshai
