= Jiyon Kathi =

Indian Bengali television soap opera

- Genre: Drama; Romance
- Written by: Leena Gangopadhyay
- Directed by: Arunava Adhikari; Koushik Pathak; Deeptomoy Sengupta
- Creative director: Chandrashekhar Chakraborty
- Presented by: Bright Advertising Pvt. Ltd.
- Starring: Aindrila Sharma; Somraj Maity
- Theme music composer: Debjyoti Mishra
- Opening theme: Jiyon Kathi
- Country of origin: India
- Original language: Bengali
- No. of seasons: 1
- No. of episodes: 486

Production
- Executive producers: Debolina Mukhopadhyay; Binoy; Taniya; Sajal Biswas
- Producer: Leena Gangopadhyay
- Production location: Kolkata
- Cinematography: Madhab Nashkar
- Camera setup: Multi-camera
- Running time: 22 minutes (approx.)
- Production companies: Magic Moments Motion Pictures and Organinc Studios

Original release
- Network: Sun Bangla
- Release: 23 September 2019 – 18 April 2021

Jiyon Kathi is an Indian Bengali television soap opera that premiered on 23 September 2019, and aired on Bengali General Entertainment Channel Sun Bangla. It is the first show produced by Organinc Studios (of Arka Ganguly), a subsidiary of Magic Moments Motion Pictures (of Saibal Banerjee and Leena Gangopadhyay), and stars Aindrila Sharma and Joy Mukherjee, later replaced by Somraj Maity.

== Premise ==
A simple girl's fate brings her closer to an angry yet influential man. Her grounded dreams are met with his sky-high ambitions eventually brewing love between them.

== Cast ==
=== Main ===
- Aindrila Sharma as Jahnabi Chatterjee a.k.a. Tuli - An IAS Officer, Roshni's younger half-sister, Rishi's second and third wife (once divorced, twice married), Dipto's wife (marriage annulled), Oli's adoptive elder paternal sister, Abhimanyu's step/adoptive mother.
- Joy Mukherjee / Somraj Maity as Rishi Sen - An IAS Officer, Jahnabi's second and fourth husband (once divorced, twice married), Roshni's husband (divorced), Oli's husband (marriage ended with her death), Abhimanyu's father.

=== Recurring ===
Rishi's family

- Manishankar Banerjee as Abhik Sen - Rishi's elder paternal uncle, Hemangini's estranged husband, Harsho's father.
- Rajashree Bhowmik as Hemangini Sen - Rishi's elder aunt, Abhik's estranged wife, Harsho's mother.
- Rahul Chakraborty as Pratik Sen - Rishi and Tilottoma's father.
- Tramila Bhattacharya / Anindita Saha Kapileshwari as Kalpana Sen - Rishi and Tilottoma's mother.
- Debottam Majumdar as Harsho Bardhan Sen a.k.a. Harsho - Rishi's elder cousin brother, Lekha's husband.
- Debolina Mukherjee as Srilekha Sen a.k.a. Lekha - Harsho's wife, Rishi's elder sister-in-law.
- Soumi Banerjee as Tilottoma Sen - Rishi's younger sister.
- Abhirup Sen as Abhimanyu Sen a.k.a. Babi - Rishi and Oli's son, Jahnabi's step/adoptive son.

Others

- Mishmee Das as Roshni Chatterjee - Jahnabi's elder half-sister, Rishi's first wife (divorced), Sanjeet's wife (till she murdered him), a girl and child trafficker.
- Bharat Kaul as Kushal Chatterjee - Anjana's husband and Roshni's father, Rai's estranged husband and Jahnabi's estranged father.
- Jayashree Mukherjee Kaul as Anjana Chatterjee - Kushal's first (legal) wife, Roshni's mother.
- Rhimjhim Gupta as Rai Chatterjee (née Bose) - Kushal's second (unofficial) wife, Jahnabi's mother.
- Shaktipada Dey as Raghav Bose - Rai's elder brother, Jahnabi's maternal uncle.
- Sukriti Lahori as Jahnabi's college principal.
- Sujoy Saha as Diptojit - Kushal's former employee, Jahnabi's first husband (marriage annulled).
- Anashuya Majumdar as the head of a group of courtesans, Jahnabi's dance teacher.
- Sonal Mishra as a courtesan
- Diganta Bagchi as a lawyer
- Nishantika Das as Oli Bose - Rishi's third wife, Jahnabi's adoptive younger maternal sister, Abhimanyu's mother. (Deceased)
- Sandip Chakraborty as Amitabh Bose - Oli's father, Jahnabi's saviour and adoptive maternal uncle.
- Sanjuktaa Roy Chowdhury as Rupasree Bose - Oli's mother, Jahnabi's adoptive aunt.
