= Sanyashi Raja =

Bengali television series

- Genre: Period Drama; Romance; Family
- Created by: Magic Moments Motion Pictures
- Written by: Leena Gangopadhyay
- Directed by: Saibal Banerjee; Sujit Paain
- Creative director: Leena Gangopadhyay
- Presented by: Bright Advertising Pvt. Ltd.
- Starring: Adrija Roy; Saheb Chatterjee
- Opening theme: Sanyashi Raja
- Country of origin: India
- Original language: Bengali
- No. of seasons: 4 (as listed by Hotstar)
- No. of episodes: 306

Production
- Executive producers: Sumit Roy; Satyajit Chakraborty (Magic Moments)
- Producers: Saibal Banerjee; Leena Gangopadhyay
- Production location: Kolkata
- Cinematography: Siddhartha Mukherjee
- Editors: Sameer; Soumen
- Camera setup: Multi-Camera
- Running time: 22 minutes (approx.)
- Production company: Magic Moments Motion Pictures

Original release
- Network: Star Jalsha
- Release: 11 September 2017 – 15 July 2018

Related
- Potol Kumar Gaanwala; Tekka Raja Badshah

Sanyashi Raja was an Indian Bengali television period drama series which aired on Star Jalsha and streams digitally on JioHotstar. It premiered on 11 September 2017, replacing Potol Kumar Gaanwala and produced by Magic Moments Motion Pictures. The show starred Adrija Roy and Saheb Chatterjee in lead roles and veteran actresses Madhabi Mukherjee and Sabitri Chatterjee in prominent roles. The show ended on 15 July 2018, after airing 306 episodes.

== Premise ==
Set in the pre-independence era, young Bimboboti marries Raja Ronendro. When he returns after being missing for a long time, Bimboboti struggles to fight the royal enemies while bringing some revolutionary changes in the household.

== Cast ==
=== Main cast ===
- Adrija Roy as Rani Bimboboti Rai (née Sen) aka Bimbo / " Mejo Bourani " - Main Lead, Mejo Kumar's wife.
- Saheb Chatterjee as Rajkumar Ronendro Vardhan Rai aka " Mejo Kumar " - Titular Lead, Bimboboti's husband.

=== Recurring ===
- Madhabi Mukherjee as Maharani Charubala Devi Rai aka " Ranimaa "
- Sabitri Chatterjee as Rajkumari Rashmoni Devi Bosu (née Rai) aka " Pishimaa "
- Laboni Sarkar as Iraboti Sen - Bimbo and Satinath's mother, Mejo Kumar's mother-in-law.
- Aparajita Adhya as Rajkumari Indubala aka Indu / Indubala Sen (née Rai) - Mejo Kumar's eldest sister, Ranimaa's first child and eldest daughter as well, Shakko's wife.
- Chandan Sen as Shakko Sen - A social activist, Indu's second husband.
- Rahul Chakraborty as Rajkumar Debendro Vardhan Rai aka " Boro Kumar " - Mejo Kumar's elder brother, Ranimaa's second child (after Indu) and eldest son.
- Titas Bhowmik as Rani Kshonoprobha Rai - Boro Kumar's wife and Ranimaa's eldest daughter-in-law.
- Suchismita Chowdhury as Rajkumari Bindubala aka Bindu - Mejo Kumar's elder sister, Ranimaa's third child and second daughter.
- Rajanya Mitra as Rajkumari Surobala aka Suro - Mejo Kumar's younger sister, Ranimaa's fifth child and youngest daughter.
- Arnab Banerjee as Rajkumar Gyanendro Vardhan Rai aka " Chhoto Kumar " - Mejo Kumar's younger brother, Ranimaa's youngest child.
- Rohit Samanta as Daktar (literally the Doctor)
- Suman Banerjee as Satinath Sen - Iraboti's son and Bibmo's elder brother, Mejo Kumar's brother-in-law.
- Ipshita Mukherjee as Roshni Bai - Mejo Kumar's courtesan and former concubine.
- Rajshree Bhowmik as Chameli Bai - Roshni Bai's elder sister and a courtesan.
- Tathagata Mukherjee as Biplobi Surjo Sekhar Sen
- Debjani Chakroborty as Rupoboti - Bimbo's elder sister (cameo, 2017)
- Sreela Majumder as Bhairabi (cameo, April 2018)
