= Iss Ishq Ka Rabb Rakha =

Indian romantic drama series

- Genre: Romance; Family drama Musical
- Created by: Leena Gangopadhyay
- Based on: Ichche Nodee by Leena Gangopadhyay
- Developed by: Leena Gangopadhyay
- Written by: Leena Gangopadhyay
- Screenplay by: Leena Gangopadhyay
- Story by: Leena Gangopadhyay
- Directed by: Ravit Kumar Tyagi
- Starring: Fahmaan Khan; Sonakshi Batra; Shreya Jain; Zaan Khan
- Theme music composer: Saurabh Kalsi
- Opening theme: "Iss Ishq Ka Rabb Rakha" by Prantik Sur
- Country of origin: India
- Original language: Hindi
- No. of seasons: 1
- No. of episodes: 225

Production
- Producers: Leena Gangopadhyay; Saibal Banerjee
- Editors: Sameer; Soumen
- Camera setup: Multi camera
- Running time: 22 minutes
- Production company: Magic Moments Motion Pictures

Original release
- Network: StarPlus
- Release: 16 September 2024 – 20 April 2025

Related
- Ichche Nodee; Yeh Rishta Kya Kehlata Hai (season 3)

Iss Ishq Ka... Rabb Rakha (transl. May God Protect This Love) is an Indian Hindi-language romantic drama television series that premiered from 16 September 2024 to 20 April 2025 on StarPlus and streams digitally on Disney+ Hotstar. Produced by Saibal Banerjee and Leena Gangopadhyay under the banner of Magic Moments Motion Pictures, the series is an official remake of the Bengali television series Ichche Nodee. It stars Fahmaan Khan and Sonakshi Batra in lead roles.

== Plot ==
The story follows the lives of two individuals from completely different cultural backgrounds. Ranbir Bajwa is a proud, care-free Punjabi pilot. Meghla Sen is a sweet, docile, traditional Bengali girl with a gift for singing.

The two cross paths and instantly fall in love. However, conflict arises when their culturally different conservative families come face-to-face. The Bajwa family represents intense Punjabi traditions, while the Sen family holds deep Bengali roots. The show explores how Ranbir and Meghla navigate their romance amid intense cultural clashes, family expectations, and personal dreams and the toxic jealousy of Meghla's academically accomplished sister, Adrija.

She has always resented Meghla for being the family's favorite, becomes utterly obsessed with Ranbir. Driven by spite, Adrija uses manipulation and outright lies to convince the families—and temporarily even Ranbir—that he should marry her instead of Meghla. This leaves a heartbroken Meghla devastated.Just as the wedding with Adrija is about to happen, Ranbir uncovers her complex web of lies and realizes how badly he misjudged Meghla. He halts the wedding, confesses his love, and marries Meghla instead.The drama deepens after the wedding. Adrija refuses to accept defeat and constantly plots to destroy their marriage. She goes as far as spiking Meghla's drinks to ruin her vital singing auditions, manipulating medical reports, and demanding a divorce. Through all the chaos, Ranbir firmly supports Meghla's singing career. In the final arc, Ranbir successfully obtains forensic proof of Adrija's continuous sabotage. Her malicious games are completely exposed to both families. Adrija is finally cast out, paving the way for Ranbir and Meghla to live happily ever after.

== Cast ==
=== Main ===
- Fahmaan Khan as Ranbir Singh Bajwa: An affluent pilot from a traditional Punjabi Munda family
- Sonakshi Batra as Meghla Bose Sen: An aspiring singer from a Bengali household
- Shreya Jain as Adrija Bose Sen: Golden child of Sen household; Ranbir's obsessive ex-lover
- Zaan Khan as Siddharth: A successful Rockstar and reality show judge

=== Recurring ===
- Jyoti Mukherjee as Mohua Sen
- Karamveer Choudhary as Balraj Bajwa (Dada ji): Patriarch of Bajwa house
- Sheela Sharma: Matriarch of Bajwa House
- Jaideep Singh as Balbir Singh Bajwa
- Shalini Kapoor Sagar as Meher Zorawar Singh Bajwa
- Vikas Grover as Harman Singh Bajwa
- Ashoor Kuckreja as Aarav Singh Bajwa
- Achal Tankwal as Param Singh Bajwa
- Tarul Swami as Arjun Singh Bajwa
- Narvinder Kumar as Rohit Gupta
- Mahesh Kumar as Dr. Naveen Sharma
- Arshi Bharti as Tanya Saxena: Co-pilot of Ranbir Bajwa
- Aman Ahtessham as Ankush
- Raj Gawande as Rohan
- Priti Harne
- Prital Patel
- Harsh Vashisht
- Gunjan Vijaya
- Navjot Singh
- Shree Upadhyaya

== Production ==
=== Development ===
Screenwriter Leena Gangopadhyay who has previously written down the scripts for Jhanak and Durga - Atoot Prem Kahani developed the central plot for her third Hindi soap opera, Iss Ishq Ka Rabb Rakha from her original Bengali show, Ichche Nodee of Star Jalsha. The show was planned as a mega cross-cultural romance drama whereas a proud Sardar fall in love with a Bengali beauty.

=== Casting ===
Sonakshi Batra and Fahmaan Khan were roped to play the leads, Meghla and Ranbir respectively. Shreya Jain was signed to play Adrija, a college topper. Shalini Kapoor and Jaideep Singh were cast in prominent roles. In February 2025, Sheela Sharma quit the show due to health reasons. In March, Zaan Khan entered the series as a parallel lead.

=== Filming ===
Principal photography took place on localized sets in Mumbai to accurately recreate Punjabi and Bengali households. Initial sequences like Megla and Rabeer meet each other were shot in Darjeeling.

=== Cancellation ===
Around November 2024, there were whirlwind of misinformation that the show was ending. The cast and crew expressed their anger and disappointment, Khan stating:

Our show celebrates love and faith. The audience appreciation has grown with every episode and we won't let negativity dull that shine When the name of the show itself translates to divine blessings, how can we not rise above challenges? We will see our 1000th episode.

— Fahmaan Khan

The series went off air owing to low TRPs than expected at that time slot and it was replaced by Kabhi Neem Neem Kabhi Shahad Shahad.

== Television specials ==
Rabb Rakha had an integration episode with Jhanak where Meghla meets Jhanak and Aniruddha in a special occasion as both shows hail from a Bengali background and produced under the same banner.

On 14 March 2025, Ghum Hai Kisikey Pyaar Meiin aired one-hour Holi special episode and had a crossover with Iss Ishq Ka... Rabb Rakha with the event hosted by Gaurav Khanna. This episode is placed under Mahasangam tray in JioHotstar.

On 15 April 2025, the show aired special episode around the beginning of Punjabi harvest festival, Baisakhi as part of Star Plus's Baisakhi Milan, a special festive episode titled Baisakhi Di Raath Sitaaron Ke Saath.
