= Nokshi Kantha =

Indian Bengali soap opera

- Genre: Drama; Family
- Created by: Magic Moments Motion Pictures
- Developed by: Leena Gangopadhyay
- Written by: Leena Gangopadhyay
- Directed by: Joydeep Karmakar
- Creative director: Chandrashekhar Chakraborty
- Presented by: Bright Advertising Pvt. Ltd.
- Starring: Manali Dey; Suman Dey
- Opening theme: Golpo Gatha Nokshi Kantha; Nisha Lagilo Re
- Composer: Debojyoti Mishra
- Country of origin: India
- Original language: Bengali
- No. of episodes: 383

Production
- Executive producers: Debolina Gangopadhyay; Sumit Kumar Roy; Shamajita, Arpita, Sohini (Zee Bangla)
- Producers: Saibal Banerjee; Romita Bose Sarkar
- Production locations: Kolkata; Baruipur; Birbhum
- Cinematography: Siddhartha Mukherjee
- Editors: Sameer; Soumen
- Camera setup: Multi-Camera
- Running time: 22 minutes
- Production company: Magic Moments Motion Pictures

Original release
- Network: Zee Bangla
- Release: 12 November 2018 – 10 July 2020

Related
- Andarmahal; Jamuna Dhaki

Nokshi Kantha was an Indian television soap opera in Bengali that premiered on 12 November 2018 and aired on the Bengali General Entertainment Channel Zee Bangla. The show was produced by Magic Moments Motion Pictures of Saibal Banerjee and Leena Gangopadhyay. The show replaced the popular drama series Andarmahal. It aired its final episode on 10 July 2020. Ki Kore Bolbo Tomay took over its time slot starting 13 July 2020.

The show stars actress Manali Dey of Bou Kotha Kao and actor Suman Dey of Bodhuboron and E Amar Gurudakshina in the lead roles. This show marks the comeback of actress Manali Dey in a lead role on Bengali Television after two years, since her portrayal of Nidhi in the Colors Bangla show Bhule Jeona Please and her stint as Mouli in the Zee Bangla horror-comedy series Bhutu. In this show, she played the lead role "Shabnam".

This was the last serial produced by Magic Moments Motion Pictures which aired on Zee Bangla, because due to some issues Magic Moments has stopped bringing shows in Zee Bangla.

However, less than 2 years later, Leena Gangopadhyay resumed writing serials for Zee Bangla with Icche Putul, but from this serial onwards, serials broadcast on Zee Bangla that are written by Mrs. Gangopadhyay are not produced by Magic Moments, but instead Organinc Studios.

== Series overview ==
Shabnam is a Muslim girl by birth, who aspires to become a doctor. She believes in changing orthodox views and discrimination in the society through her continuous quest to harbour a kinship with a traditional Bengali Hindu family that she has known since her childhood. Her life takes a turn when she runs away from her forced marriage and is rescued by a hearty doctor, Jashojit. Jashojit marries her in order to stand by Shabnam in her quest to become self dependent and achieve her dreams. What follows is how Shabnam fulfills her dream of becoming a doctor, while she struggles to adjust in a conservative Hindu family and get accepted by her in-laws.

== Cast ==
=== Main ===
- Manali Dey as Dr. Shabnam Sen (née Khatun) aka Aparajita – Jash's first and third wife and lover, Debdip's wife.
- Suman Dey as Late Dr. Jashojeet Bose aka Jash – Shabnam's first and third husband and lover, Rohini's husband. (Deceased)
- Sneha Chatterjee as Dr. Rohini Bose (née Choudhury) – Jash's second and fourth wife and obsessive lover.
- Indrajit Chakraborty as Dr. Debdip Sen – Shabnam's second husband.

=== Recurring ===
- Chitra Sen as Ratulmoni Roy Chowdhury aka Shona Thammi – Ranja's mother, Jash's paternal grandaunt, Charubala's elder sister.
- Madhabi Mukherjee as Charubala Bose aka Thammi – Jash's paternal grandmother, Ratulmoni's younger sister, Ranja's maternal aunt.
- Santu Mukherjee as Hiranmoy Roy Chowdhury aka Daduvai – Ratulmoni's younger brother-in-law, Ranja's maternal uncle and Jash's paternal grandfather.
- Chhanda Karanjee Chatterjee as Arati Roy Chowdhury aka Chhoto Thammi – Ratulmoni's younger sister-in-law, Ranja's paternal aunt and Jash's grandmother.
- Arghya Mukherjee as Avik Bose – Jash and June's father, Kankana's husband and Charubala's elder son.
- Anushree Das as Kankana Bose – Jash and June's mother, Avik's wife and Charubala's elder daughter-in-law. She is stern and arrogant, and supports Rohini in her intentions to control Jash's actions.
- Rahul Chakraborty as Anindya Bose – Jash's paternal uncle, Sangeeta's husband and Charubala's younger son.
- Anindita Saha Kapileshwari as Sangeeta Bose – Jash's paternal aunt, Anindya's wife and Charubala's younger daughter-in-law.
- Rajashree Bhowmik as Ranjaboti Sheikh (née Rai Choudhury) aka Ranja – Ratulmoni's daughter, Jash's paternal aunt (actually his father Avik's maternal cousin sister) and Iqbal's wife (Later widowed). She takes interest in performing arts and is Shabnam's mentor and well-wisher.
- Kaushik Chakraborty as Late Iqbal Sheikh – Ranja's husband, Jash's paternal uncle, Shabnam's adoptive maternal uncle. (Deceased)
- Joyjit Banerjee as Parag Bose – Jash's cousin brother (Charubala's brother-in-law's grandson), Mahua's husband, a salaryman.
- Rajanya Mitra as Mahua Bose – Parag's wife and Jash's sister-in-law.
- Debolina Mukherjee as June Bose – Avik and Kankana's daughter, Jash's elder sister and an engineer by profession. She is involved in a romantic affair with her divorcee boss. She is straightforward, honest and fearless by nature.
- Shaktipada Dey as Rabiyul Khatun – Shabnam's father.
- Sagarika Roy as Selina Khatun (née Tabassum) – Shabnam's mother.
- Saswati Guha Thakurta / Unknown as Samapti Choudhury – Rohini's mother, a socialite.
- Phalguni Chatterjee as Rangan Choudhury – Rohini's father, a businessman.
- Arup Roy as Dr. Rahul Chatterjee – Jash's senior cum friend, Shabnam's supporter.
- Abhijit as Dr. Swapnodeep Ghosh – Jash and Rohini's cunning friend.
- Sreela Majumdar as Debdip's mother
- Shyamal Dutta as Debdip's father
- Rupa Bhattacharjee as Madhubani Ghosh – Shabnam's lawyer in her alleged murder case against Rohini.
