= Dujone (TV series) =

Bengali web series

- Release poster
- Genre: Thriller
- Directed by: Promita Bhattacharya
- Country of origin: India
- Original language: Bengali
- No. of seasons: 1
- No. of episodes: 10

Production
- Production company: SVF Entertainment

Original release
- Release: 9 July 2021

Dujone is a Bengali-language streaming television series streaming on hoichoi from July 9, 2021. The series stars Soham Chakraborty, Srabanti Chatterjee making their OTT debuts in the lead roles. The series is directed by Promita Bhattacharya, who also worked on the screenplay along with Mitali Ojha and Romit Ojha.

== Plot ==
The story is centered on an imminent terrorist attack and mistaken identities — a woman suspects her husband is hiding something after suffering from a near-death experience. She follows him to keep tabs on him. The series has two parallel stories — one where the Intelligence Bureau is trying to impede an attack from China, the other concerns an affluent family in Kolkata where things alter post their heir's mishap. After Amar Basu Thakur's unfortunate accident, he seems to be forgetting things, and only his wife Ahana notices this. With her efforts yielding no result, she approaches a private detective. As it turns out that her husband is far from the man she thought him to be.

== Cast ==
- Soham Chakraborty as Amor
- Srabanti Chatterjee as Ahana
- Rajdeep Gupta as Proshit
- Debshankar Haldar as Rajat
- Kamaleshwar Mukherjee as IB Chief
- Anindita Saha Kapileshwari as Bibha
- Adrija Roy as Kalki
- Indrajit Mazumder
- Poulomi Das

== Season 1 (2021) ==
On 9 July 2021 hoichoi released the Dujone original series with 10 episodes.

== Episodes ==
No.	Title	Directed by	Original release date
1	"Shob Bhule Jachhe"	Promita Bhattacharya	9 July 2021
2	"Amar and Dance?"	Promita Bhattacharya	9 July 2021
3	"Oh My Love"	Promita Bhattacharya	9 July 2021
4	"Sotyo Boro Kotheen"	Promita Bhattacharya	9 July 2021
5	"Etao Ami, Otao Ami"	Promita Bhattacharya	9 July 2021
6	"Eta Kaar Golpo?"	Promita Bhattacharya	9 July 2021
7	"Kom Janlei Bhalo"	Promita Bhattacharya	9 July 2021
8	"Baagher Mukhe"	Promita Bhattacharya	9 July 2021
9	"Shomoy Eshechhe"	Promita Bhattacharya	9 July 2021
10	"Ki Biswash Korbo?"	Promita Bhattacharya	9 July 2021
