= Mrs Undercover =

2023 film by Anushree Mehta

- Official release poster
- Directed by: Anushree Mehta
- Written by: Abir Sengupta; Anushree Mehta
- Produced by: Abir Sengupta; Anushree Mehta; Varun Bajaj; Ishan Saksena; Sunil Shah
- Starring: Radhika Apte; Rajesh Sharma; Sumeet Vyas; Angana Roy; Laboni Sarkar; Amrita Chattopadhyay; Akshay Kapoor; Indrasish Roy; Biswajit Chakraborty
- Cinematography: Abhimanyu Sengupta
- Edited by: Sandeep Kurup
- Music by: Score: Kshitij Tarey; Songs: Amit Sawant; Ankit Shah; Abhinav Shekhar
- Production companies: B4U Motion Pictures; Jaadugar Films; Knight Sky Movies
- Distributed by: ZEE5
- Release date: 14 April 2023
- Running time: 107 minutes
- Country: India
- Language: Hindi

Mrs Undercover is a 2023 Indian Hindi-language spy comedy film directed by Anushree Mehta and produced by Abir Sengupta, Anushree Mehta, Varun Bajaj, Ishan Saksena and Sunil Shah. The film stars are Radhika Apte, Sumeet Vyas and Rajesh Sharma in key roles. The film premiered on 14 April 2023 on ZEE5 to negative reviews from critics.

== Plot ==
An unidentified man who calls himself "The Common Man" dates a beautiful girl. However, on the pretext of dropping her home, he takes her to a secluded place and brutally kills her. Before killing her he makes a video from her phone where she is narrating how she got a conviction for her client's husband as a lawyer, which he broadcasts to news channel.

A team of special force led by Rangeela is tracking Common Man, a serial killer who targets strong and independent professional women. The common man has a white-collared job by the day and lives with his mother. He has a team that keeps an eye on the special force and kills one of their last agents. With great difficulty, Rangeela locates an undercover agent Durga who is a housewife and at times clumsy in her work, lives with her husband, in-laws and has a school-going kid.

Rangeela convinces her to go undercover and reveal the identity of the common man. Durga flatly refuses as it has been 13 years and her cover has now become the reality of her life. With perseverance, Rangeela convinces Durga for the job. She requests a refresher training, but Rangeela refuses because this would expose her to the moles of the common man.

Her first task is to chase a person who would exchange a packet at Victoria Memorial at 8:30 pm. Durga is quick witted and balances her household duties along with her undercover work and tracks a person going inside a girl's college.

Meanwhile, Durga meets a woman named Ayesha who has rented a house next door. Next Durga is assigned a course in the same college. Her husband mocks her and flatly refuses to allow her to take the course. This conversation is overheard by her mother-in-law. She explains to her son how a good husband should not try to control his wife, but support her endeavours.

On the first day of college, Durga bumps into Ayesha who is a teacher there. Later in her first class unknown to her, she comes face-to-face with the common man who is their instructor Ajay Sir.

By the night Durga hones her skills with her son's toy guns and video games and in the day time tries to trace who the common man is. Ajay meanwhile has written to the CM of the state who is a woman to attend an art performance in his college. Rangeela requests CM to accept the invitation as this gives them a chance to reveal common man. Accidentally Durga reads romantic chats of Ayesha with her husband's and goes in a state of shock and stops reporting to her duty. Rangeela visits her place and convinces her to report back to her duty in return she would get feeds of her husband's chat.

Ayesha is revealed to be a mole of Ajay who wants to tie all loose ends before he executes the biggest job i.e. kill the CM. Ayesha mistakes Durga's husband to be an undercover agent and calls him to a hotel to eliminate him.

Durga who has also received the message, saves her husband in nick of time. Her husband is shocked by her new avatar however he will have to stay in custody so that her cover is not blown. Late night Ayesha attempts to kill Durga but gets eliminated by Durga herself.

Next day at the performance in the college in presence of CM, Durga spots Ajay leaving the hall and figures out he is the common man and the target is CM who would be eliminated by a bomb to be exploded as confetti is blown at the end of the performance. Durga is able to defuse the bomb, evacuate the hall and corner Ajay and expose his identity as the common man.

When he finds that there is no escape he confronts her and tell that special force does not have any credible evidence that would hold in the court and he would be free within few hours. Durga concedes that they do not have any credible evidence and hence the only way justice can be meted out would be killing him and making a video in the same manner he did for his victims. The CM agrees to this and next day it is revealed in the news that Common man is dead.

Durga's husband apologizes for cheating on her, however, she refuses to accept his apology as there is no sincerity in it. Rangeela assigns her a new mission with a new cover.

== Cast ==
- Radhika Apte as Durga
- Rajesh Sharma as Chief Rangeela
- Sumeet Vyas as The Common Man
- Angana Roy as Kajal
- Laboni Sarkar as Durga's mother-in-law
- Amrita Chattopadhyay as Priyanka
- Indrasish Roy as Aditya
- Biswajit Chakraborty as Durga's father-in-law
- Saheb Chatterjee as Durga's husband
- Akshay Kapoor as Prabal
- Satish Badal as special force cab driver
- Roshni Bhattacharya as Aisha
- Nandini Chatterjee as the Chief Minister

== Production ==
The film was announced in March 2021 after the first wave of Covid pandemic in India. They started shooting in Kolkata amidst the second wave in 2021. Actor Sumeet Vyas reportedly was infected with COVID-19 while he was amidst shooting for the film.

== Reception ==
Shilajit Mitra of The Hindu wrote "The metaphor isn't new. Kahaani, another Durga-fixated film with feminist themes, is probably to blame."

Shubhra Gupta of The Indian Express rated the film 1.5 stars out of 5 and wrote "Except the way it unspools, there are neither laughs nor thrills in this raising-the-gong-for-feminism ‘Mrs Undercover’."

Saibal Chatterjee of NDTV felt the film as "half-pie mish-mash" and wrote "Rajesh Sharma, who has a notable track record as a versatile actor, makes futile efforts to make an underwritten role work. A daft plot and pedestrian filmmaking combine to make Mrs Undercover an eminently forgettable action-comedy."

Prateek Sur for Outlook India rated the film 2 stars out of 5 and wrote "‘Mrs Undercover’ did have great potential, however, lacklustre writing especially the climax killed the entire fun of the movie."
