= Namma Lacchi =

Indian Kannada drama television series

- Genre: Drama
- Screenplay by: Raghucharan
- Directed by: Samprathvi
- Starring: See below
- Country of origin: India
- Original language: Kannada
- No. of episodes: 364

Production
- Producer: J. Jayamma
- Editor: Nitya N. Doddery
- Camera setup: Multi-camera
- Running time: 22 minutes
- Production company: Shri Jaimata Combines

Original release
- Network: Star Suvarna
- Release: 6 February 2023 – 6 April 2024

Related
- Potol Kumar Gaanwala

Namma Lacchi is an Indian Kannada language Drama television series which premiered from 6 February 2023 on Star Suvarna. It stars Vijay Suriya, Neha Gowda and Vanishree in lead roles. This show is produced by Jai Mata Combines. It is an official remake of Bengali TV series Potol Kumar Gaanwala.

== Plot ==
Budding singer Sangam falls in love with and secretly marries a village girl named Girija living in Sampigepur. But there comes a situation where he has to choose between Girija and his career. But not knowing that Girija is pregnant, he leaves her and chooses a career. Later he marries rich Deepika. Deepika cherishes her daughter Riya.

== Cast ==
=== Main ===
- Sanghavi Kantesh as Lacchi : Sangam and Girija's daughter
- Vijay Suriya as Sangam Sathanur: Lacchi's father
- Neha Gowda as Girija/Jaaji
- Aishwarya Sindhugi / Sara Annaiah as Deepika : Sangam's second wife, Rhea's mother

=== Recurring ===
- Sridisha as Rhea
- Vanishree as Jolly Janaki
- Sushmita as Shantavva
- Vikas Kargod as Sagar
- Manasa Bhatt as Manasa
- Deepa Ravi Shankar as Sarada
- Vinay Gowda as Bhadri
- Chandrashekhar Shastri as Gopala
- Yamuna Srinidi as Cop
- Vinay Gowda

== Adaptations ==
Language	Title	Original release	Network(s)	Last aired	Notes
Bengali	Potol Kumar Gaanwala পটল কুমার গানওয়ালা	14 December 2015	Star Jalsha	10 September 2017	Original
Telugu	Koilamma కోయిలమ్మ	5 September 2016	Star Maa	18 September 2020	Remake
Malayalam	Vanambadi വാനമ്പാടി	30 January 2017	Asianet	18 September 2020	Remake
Tamil	Mouna Raagam மௌன ராகம்	24 April 2017	Star Vijay	17 March 2023	Remake
Hindi	Kullfi Kumarr Bajewala कुल्फ़ी कुमार बाजेवाला	19 March 2018	StarPlus	7 February 2020	Remake
Marathi	Tuzech Mi Geet Gaat Aahe तुझेच मी गीत गात आहे	2 May 2022	Star Pravah	16 June 2024	Remake
Kannada	Namma Lacchi ನಮ್ಮ ಲಚ್ಚಿ	6 February 2023	Star Suvarna	6 April 2024	Remake
