= Potol Kumar Gaanwala =

Indian television series

- Genre: Family
- Screenplay by: Sriparna; Dialogues; Sudip Paul
- Story by: Shahana Dutta
- Directed by: Swarnendu Samaddar
- Starring: Hiya Dey; Saheb Chatterjee; Swagata Mukherjee; Bhaskar Banerjee; Anindita Raychaudhury; Nilanjan Datta
- Composers: Upaali Chatterjee; Debjit Roy
- Country of origin: India
- Original language: Bengali
- No. of episodes: 632

Production
- Producers: Shrikant Mohta; Mahendra Soni
- Production location: Kolkata
- Camera setup: Multi-camera
- Running time: 22 minutes
- Production company: Shree Venkatesh Films

Original release
- Network: Star Jalsha
- Release: 14 December 2015 – 10 September 2017

Potol Kumar Gaanwala (transl. Potol Kumar the singer) is an Indian musical Bengali television drama which premiered on 14 December 2015 and aired on Star Jalsha. Potol Kumar Gaanwala replaced Ishti Kutum on that date. The show starred Hiya Dey, Saheb Chatterjee, Swagata Mukherjee and Bhaskar Banerjee. It was produced by Shrikant Mohta and Mahendra Soni. After almost two years, the show went off air on 10 September 2017. It was replaced by Sanyashi Raja.

== Plot ==
This show follows the story of a girl named Potol, who is a singer. After her mother's demise, she goes to Kolkata to search her father whose identity she does not know. The show starts with saints singing bhajans, but Subhaga warns them after hearing them. When Rashmoni teased her, she went away. Potol was following the ambassadors which were in front of her. She stopped them and sang a song with her soulful voice. Rashmoni went to search her. Subhaga was suffering from cancer. When Potol went to give milk in the temple, she was thrown out. For that, Rashmoni gets angry and in anger, she misbehaves with her children and with Potol.

One night, Aditi intentionally hits Subhaga with her car. Subhaga meets with an accident. Potol used to sing to get money so that her mother can recover. When she went to the hospital to give money for her mother's treatment, they say that Subhaga is no more. Elsewhere, Potol thinks that her mother has recovered. When she sees her mother's dead body, she sings and also recollects the memory with her mother. After her mother's demise, she decided to go to Kolkata to search her father. Varun supports Potol. Potol takes the guise of a boy.

Potol belongs from a male dominated society where she, born as a girl, faces many hurdles post her mother's death. To break the barriers and to meet her estranged father, she sings at streets to earn money so that she can get a pixie haircut so that nobody recognises her and disguise as a boy. When her aunt sees her, she couldn't recognize it to be Potol because of her short hair. She goes to Kolkata by train and she sings. One day, Chandan takes Potol to the Mullick mansion. She starts living in the Mullick mansion. But Tuli always misbehaves with her.

On the day of Holi, Potol's aunt kidnapped Tuli. That night, Rashmomi catches Potol and takes her. She lived with the taxi driver and his wife, Kamala. One day, Potol's aunt lied Deepa by saying that Potol is a thief. When Potol again starts staying in the Mullick mansion, the full family becomes angry on her.Nobody believed Potol. Subhaga, the governess starts taking care of Potol as a mother. After Potol gets injured in a temple, she gets hospitalized. Tuli befriends with Potol. Potol suffers from memory loss. When Tuli learns the truth about Potol, she says Subhaga to move out of the house. One day, Ankita gives Potol a makeup of a joker and she gets embarrassed. Aditi plays a dirty game in the conference. Potol spoils the conference by slapping Tuli. When Potol brings Tuli home, Tuli slaps her. Elsewhere, Tridha and Sujon were also beside Potol.

On the day of Potol's birthday, Tuli spoils the decoration. Elsewhere, Subhaga and Sujon redecorate. When Potol sings song, she sees her mother. Sujon couldn't believe Potol to be his daughter. Elsewhere, Tuli becomes angry. Rashmoni comes in the party to expose the truth that Potol didn't steal. Sujon divorces Aditi and Tridha takes Tuli to USA. After Tuli insults Subhaga by saying an outsider, she decides to leave the house. Potol stops her. Later, the family insists Sujon to marry Subhaga. Sujon and Subhaga get married. On the wedding night, Aditi and Tamali enter. Aditi tries to create obstacles in Potol's life. Aditi also said that she killed Potol's mother. Potol, Subhaga, Chandan, Sujon and his mother goes for vacation at Tiyahata. Aditi masks herself and follows them. Potol goes alone in the train towards the gate of the train. Suddenly, Aditi goes to the train. When they reach, Aditi follows them and goes in the same hotel where the Mullicks went. Aditi decides to kill Subhaga. One day, Aditi pushes Subhaga on the mountains and Subhaga falls down. Potol tries to grab Subhaga but Subhaga falls down and Subhaga dies. Later, Potol goes to a temple and burns her hand.

=== 12 years later ===
The saints sing bhajans but Sujon warns. She doesn't allow Potol to song after Subhaga's incident on the mountains. Elsewhere, Potol goes to temple on her 18th birthday. She recollects the memory of that day when she went to give milk in the temple and was thrown out. Sujon goes to search Potol but suddenly he meets with an accident. Potol rescues Sujon. She refuses to get married. That night, Tridha brings Tuli back to the Mullick mansion by promising that when Potol will turn 18, Tridha will bring Tuli back. She starts befriend with Aahir after intoxicating. One day, Sujon meets with an accident and Sujon gets hospitalized. For the theatre, she disguises herself as a boy. Her aunt gets angry upon seeing this. Potol marries Aahir. Potol and Aahir go and stay at their house in village. That night, Aditi gets angry on Potol in the boat, but suddenly falls from the boat. Potol saves Aditi. Tuli tries to attack Potol with a gun and Aditi warns Tuli. Aditi gets arrested and Tuli leaves for her correction and Potol and Aahir live happily ever after.

== Cast ==
=== Main ===
- Piya Debnath / Aishwarya Sen as Poteshwari Chakraborty (née Mallick) aka Potol – A born singer; Sujon and Subhaga's daughter; Subhaga Mallick's foster daughter; Aahir's wife. (2017)/(2017)
  - Hiya Dey as young Poteshwari Mallick aka Potol (2015 – 2017)
- Saheb Chatterjee as Sujon Kumar Mallick aka Boltu – A famous singer; Chandan's brother; Subhaga's ex-fiancé; Aditi's ex-husband; Subhaga Mallick's husband; Potol's father. (2015 – 2017)
- Rudrajit Mukherjee as Aahir Chakraborty – Potol's Husband (2017)
- Ashim Mukherjee (actor) as Mr. Agarwal, Music Arranger

=== Recurring ===
- Tramila Bhattacharya as Aditi Ganguly – Tamali's daughter; Sujon's second wife; Tuli's mother; Potol and Subhaga's (both biological and step) stalker and arch rival. (Antagonist) (2015–2017)
- Anindita Raychaudhury as Subhaga Gwalini – Nando's sister; Sujon's ex-fiancé; Potol's mother (Deceased) (2015–2016)
- Adrija Roy as Subhaga Mallik (née Mohapatra)/Shoimaa – a governess turned Potol's step mother, Tridha's sister and Sujon's third wife (2016–2017)
- Shyamoupti Mudly as Tulika Banerjee aka Tuli – Ranjit and Aditi's daughter; Sujon's step-daughter; Potol's arch rival (2017)
  - Sinchana Sarkar as Young Tuli. (2015–2017)
- Swagata Mukherjee as Rashmoni Gwalini (née Sikdar) – Potol's aunt, Nando's wife. (Antagonist) (2015 – 2017)
- Rohit Mukherjee as Nando Gwalini – Potol's uncle, Rashmoni's husband, Subhaga's brother. (2015–2017)
- Kaushiki Guha as Deepali Mallik (née Sen) aka Deepa – Chandan's wife; Potol's paternal aunt. (Former Antagonist) (2015–2017)
- Chhanda Karanjee Chatterjee as Chandan and Sujon's mother, Potol's paternal grandmother. (2015–2017)
- Rani Mukerji as Tridha Mohapatra – Subhaga's elder sister. (2017)
- Sourav Das as Bishtu, the taxi driver, Kamala's husband. (2016)
- Mimi Dutta as Kamala, Bishtu's wife. (2016)
- Anindya Banerjee as Varun (2015 – 2016)
- Mafin Chakraborty as Ankita Banerjee (2017)
- Bhaswar Chatterjee as Ranjit Banerjee –Tuli's biological father. (Deceased) (2016–2017)
- Manasi Sinha as Tamali Ganguly (née Chakraborty) – Tuli's maternal grandmother, Suparna and Aditi's mother, Tapan's widow. (Antagonist) (2015–2017)
- Bhaskar Banerjee as Chandan Malik – Sujon's elder brother, Deepali's husband, Potol's paternal uncle, Subhaga's brother in-law. (2015–2017)
- Riyanka Dasgupta as Suparna Ganguly – Aditi's sister, Tuli's maternal aunt. (2015–2016)
- Saheli Ghosh Ray as Potol's cousin sister (2016)
- Arshiya Mukherjee as Potol's cousin sister (2015–2016)
- Somasree Chaki as Aahir's mother and Potol's mother-in-law (2017)
- Sumanta Mukherjee as Tapan Ganguly – Aditi's father, Tamali's husband, Tuli's maternal grandfather (2015–2016)
- Mallika Banerjee as a Vaishnavi (2016)
- Riya Ganguly as a Vaishnavi (2016 - 2017)
- Dolon Roy as Satyabati (2016–2017)

== Adaptations ==
Language	Title	Original release	Network(s)	Last aired	Notes
Bengali	Potol Kumar Gaanwala পটল কুমার গানওয়ালা	14 December 2015	Star Jalsha	10 September 2017	Original
Malayalam	Vanambadi വാനമ്പാടി	30 January 2017	Asianet	18 September 2020	Remake
Tamil	Mouna Raagam மௌன ராகம்	24 April 2017	Star Vijay	17 March 2023	Remake
Hindi	Kullfi Kumarr Bajewala कुल्फ़ी कुमार बाजेवाला	19 March 2018	StarPlus	7 February 2020	Remake
Marathi	Tuzech Mi Geet Gaat Aahe तुझेच मी गीत गात आहे	2 May 2022	Star Pravah	16 June 2024	Remake
Kannada	Namma Lacchi ನಮ್ಮ ಲಚ್ಚಿ	6 February 2023	Star Suvarna	6 April 2024	Remake
