= Tramila Bhattacharya =

Indian actress

- Born: 11 May 1984 (age 41); Calcutta, West Bengal, India
- Occupations: Actress; Politician
- Years active: 1997–present
- Political party: Bharatiya Janata Party (2021–present)
- Spouse: Surjya Sekhar Dutta (m. 2003)

Tramila Bhattacharya (also Bhattacherjee; born 11 May 1984) is an Indian actress and politician who works in Bengali and Hindi television and films. She started her career in the Bengali serial Seemarekha on Doordarshan Bangla in the 1990s.

She has appeared in serials including Mohini, Prati Chuyanno Minute, Pratiksha ektu bhalobashar, Ekak Dashak Shatak, Poush Faguner Pala, Ananya, Sonar Harin, Ghente GHA, Rajjotak, Aaj Ari kaal Bhaab, Mayurpankshi, Mohor, Potol Kumar Gaanwala, Adorini, Jay Kali Kalkattawali, Jay Kanhaiya Laal Ki, Jiyon Kathi, Mom Palok, Mou-Er-Bari, Agni Juger Padatik, Surjomukhi, Jiban rekha, Subarna Golok, Aloukik, Haste Mana, Ek Je Achhe Kanya, Durbeen, Ajob Saja, and others. She also worked on the streaming television series Hello, which was released on Hoichoi.

== Career ==
She appeared in Ajob Saja, Suborno Golok, Ek Je Ache Kanya, Mahakaal, Mohini, Ekak Dashak Shatak, Hastey Mana, Agni Juger Padatik, Proti Chuyanno Minute ey, Poush Faguner Pala, Aloukik, Rohoshyo Golpo, Surjomukhi, Chokher Bali, Nayantara, Pratiksha Ektu Bhalobashar, Sahityer Sera Somoy, Purba Paschim, and Ananya.

In 2012 she opened her own production house "Beautiful Mind Creations" and produced an animation project for Rupashi Bangla on Kakababu.

In 2013 she started working on Ghnete Ghaw for Akash-8. Then she worked on Rajjotak for Zee and then on Aaj Ari Kaal Bhaab, Potol Kumar Gaanwala, Adorini, Jai Kanhaiya Laal Ki, Jai Kaali Kalkattawali, Mayurpankhi, Jiyonkathi, Mohor, Mompalok, Mou-er-Bari, and Panchami. She acted for two Hoichoi Bengali webseries- Hello, Hello-2 and Gora-2.

== Political career ==
She joined the Bharatiya Janata Party on 17 February 2021.

== Personal life ==
She married Surjya Sekhar Dutta in 2003 and have a daughter.

== Television ==
=== 1997 ===
- Sheemarekha
- Ajob Saja
- Suborno Golok

=== 1998 ===
- Ek Je Achey Kanya
- Durbeen
- Mahakaal
- Maa Manasha
- Mohini

=== 1999 ===
- Ekak Dashak Shatak
- Hastey Mana
- Agni Juger Padatik

=== 2000 ===
- Prati Chuyanno Minute ey
- Poush Faguner Pala
- Aloukik
- Rahashya Galpo
- Jiban Rekha
- Surjomukhi- Nati Binodini
- Chokher Bali

=== 2001 ===
- Nayantara
- Ekak Dashak Shatak
- Pratiksha Ektu Bhalobashar
- Sahityer Sera Samay
- Purba Paschim

=== 2002 ===
- Pratiksha Ektu Bhalobashar (continue)
- Ananya
- Sahityer Sera Somoy, Shom Theke Shukro
- Golpo Guchchho

=== 2003 ===
- Peatiksha Ektu Bhalobashar
- Ananya (Continue)

=== 2004-2005 ===
- Pratiksha Ektu Bhalobashar
- Aye Khuku Aye – Akash Bangla

=== 2009-10 ===
- Sonar Harin

=== 2013 ===
- Ghente Ghaw

=== 2015-2017 ===
- Aaj Ari Kaal Bhaab
- Potol Kumar Gaanwala
- Adorini
- Jai Kali Kalkattawali

=== 2018 ===
- Mayurpankhi

=== 2019 ===
- Mohor
- Jiyon Kathi

=== 2021 ===
- Jai Kanhaiya Lal ki
- Mou-Er-Bari

=== 2022-2023 ===
- Ponchomi

=== 2023-2025 ===
- Mithijhora

== Web series ==
=== 2017 ===
- Hello

=== 2019 ===
- Hello 2

=== 2023 ===
- Gora 2

== Awards ==
Mahanayak Uttam Kumar Award- Awarded 3 times consecutively.

- Best Actress (Lead) in Mohini – 1998, 1999, 2000.

Pramathesh Barua Award:

- Ekak Dashak Shatak – Best Actress - 2001
- Potol Kumar Gaanwala – Best Negative Character Female - 2016
