= Adrija Roy =

Indian television actress

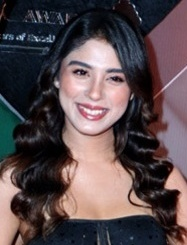
- Roy in 2025
- Born: 4 July 1999 (age 27); Kolkata, West Bengal, India
- Occupations: Actress; model
- Years active: 2015–present
- Known for: Potol Kumar Gaanwala; Imlie; Anupamaa; Kundali Bhagya
- Partner: Vignesh Iyer (2026–present)

Adrija Roy (born 4 July 1999) is an Indian actress who primarily works in Hindi and Bengali television. Roy is best known for her portrayal of Subhaga in Potol Kumar Gaanwala, Mou in Mou Er Bari, Charu Roy Chowdhury in Durga Aur Charu, Imlie Rana Reddy in Imlie, Palki Khurana in Kundali Bhagya and Rahi Kapadia Kothari in Anupamaa.

== Early life ==
Roy was born on 4 July 1999 in Kolkata. In late 2022, she shifted to Mumbai for better career opportunities.

== Personal life ==
After a brief dating for about seven months, Roy got engaged to her boyfriend, entrepreneur Vignesh Iyer, in an intimate ceremony on 25 January 2026.

== Career ==
In 2016, Roy made her television debut with Bengali series Bedini Moluar Kotha. Roy continued to play many pivotal and lead roles in several Bengali series. She became known and accepted from Potol Kumar Gaanwala where her character Subhaga was loved so much and that gave her immense fame and popularity as an actress.

In February 2023, Roy made her debut in Hindi television as one of the titular leads, Devi "Charu" Roy Chaudhary Banerjee, opposite Mohit Kumar and later opposite Kunal Jaisingh, and alongside Rachi Sharma, in Durga Aur Charu, until it went off-air in April 2023.

From September 2023, she played third generation protagonist, Imlie Rana Reddy (formerly Chaudhary) in Imlie, opposite Sai Ketan Rao until the show went off-air in May 2024.

In the same month, she replaced Sana Sayyad as Dr. Palki Khurana, opposite Baseer Ali and Paras Kalnawat in Kundali Bhagya until the show went off-air in December 2024. Following which, she replaced Alisha Parveen Khan as Raahi "Aadhya/Chhoti Anu" Kapadia Kothari, opposite Shivam Khajuria in Anupamaa in the same month.

== Filmography ==
=== Films ===
Year	Title	Role	Language	Ref.
2018	Inner Me	Addy	Bengali	
2019	Parineeta	Tusu	Bengali	
2021	Golper Mayajaal		Bengali	

=== Television ===
Year	Title	Role	Language	Ref.
2016	Bedini Moluar Kotha	Urmimala	Bengali	
2016–2017	Potol Kumar Gaanwala	Subhaga Mohapatra/Shoimaa	Bengali	
2017	Agnijal		Bengali	
2017	Jai Kali Kalkattawali	Diya Singha	Bengali	
2017–2018	Sanyashi Raja	Rani Bimboboti Rai/Bimbo/Mejo Bourani	Bengali	
2019	Thakumar Jhuli	Princess Kalabati	Bengali	
2019	Thakumar Jhuli	Princess Malonchamala	Bengali	
2019–2020	Mongolchandi	Khullona	Bengali	
2020	Durga Durgeshwari	Devi Roy Chowdhary	Bengali	
2021–2022	Mou-Er-Bari	Moubani Sen Gangopadhyay	Bengali	
2022	Bikram Betal	Rani Kornabati	Bengali	
2023	Durga Aur Charu	Devi "Charu" Roy Choudhary	Hindi	
2023–2024	Imlie	Imlie Rana	Hindi	
2024	Kundali Bhagya	Dr. Palki Khurana	Hindi	
2024–present	Anupamaa	Rahi "Aadhya" Kapadia Kothari	Hindi	

=== Web series ===
Year	Title	Role	Language	Ref.
2021	Boyfriends & Girlfriends	Shreya	Bengali	
2021	Dujone	Kalki	Bengali	
2023	Ghoshbabur Retirement Plan	Nandita	Bengali	

=== Music videos ===
Year	Title	Role	Ref.
2020	Ashe Pashe Thak Sararat	Bengali	
2020	Teri Meri Dosti	Hindi	
2020	Dugga Elo	Bengali	

== See also ==
- List of Hindi television actresses
- List of Indian television actresses
