= Nari Choritro Bejay Jotil =

2026 Indian Bengali film

- Theatrical release poster
- Bengali: নারী চরিত্র বেজায় জটিল
- Literally: Female natures are very complex
- Directed by: Sumeet–Saahil
- Written by: Sreejib
- Story by: Kedar Shinde Sreejib
- Produced by: Ankush Hazra; Sani Ghose Ray
- Starring: Ankush Hazra; Oindrila Sen; Debraj Bhattacharya; Sohini Sengupta; Sohag Sen
- Cinematography: Animesh Ghorui
- Edited by: Sanglap Bhowmik
- Music by: Songs: Ishan Mitra; B Show; Avishek Saha; Score: Ishan Mitra
- Production companies: Ankush Hazra Motion Pictures; Acropoliis Entertainment Private Limited; RT Entertainment
- Distributed by: PVR Inox Pictures
- Release date: 9 January 2026
- Running time: 131 minutes
- Country: India
- Language: Bengali

Nari Choritro Bejay Jotil (Bengali pronunciation: [nari tʃoritro bedʒaɪ ʤoʈil]; transl. Female natures are very complex) is a 2026 Indian Bengali-language fantasy comedy film directed by Sumeet–Saahil. Produced by Ankush Hazra and Sani Ghose Ray under the banner of Ankush Hazra Motion Pictures and Acropoliis Entertainment respectively, the film stars Ankush and Oindrila Sen in their fifth pairing, alongside an ensemble cast of, Debraj Bhattacharya, Sohini Sengupta, Sohag Sen, Ipshita Mukherjee and Nabanita Malakar. It follows an unexpected turn in a man's life after he suddenly gains the ability to read women's minds and embarks on a therapeutic journey towards greater empathy and understanding.

Written by Sreejib, the core concept of the film is inspired by American film What Women Want (2000). Announced in February 2025, the film shares its title with Kishore Kumar's song from the 1981 film Ogo Bodhu Shundori, marking the second collaboration between Sumeet–Saahil and Ankush. Principal Photography commenced in March 2025 and wrapped by in July 2025, making as one of the shortest periods in which a Bengali film has been shot. Music of the film is composed by Ishan Mitra, B Show and Avishek Saha, while Animesh Ghorui and Sanglap Bhowmik handled its cinematography and editor respectively.

Nari Choritro Bejay Jotil was theatrically released on 9 January 2026, coinciding with Sankranti.

== Plot ==
Jhontu, a street smart struggles to comprehend the complexities of the women. He lives with his mother, sister, grandmother. All of a sudden he mysteriously gains the power to hear women's inner thoughts. This creates huge chaos and laughter when judging women and their emotion. He learnt that understanding women remains a greatest challenge of men's life.

== Cast ==
- Ankush Hazra as Jagatdata Chatterjee / Jhontu
- Oindrila Sen as Aankhi Mukherjee
- Sohag Sen as Madhabi
- Sohini Sengupta as Jhontu's mother
- Nabanita Malakar
- Debraj Bhattacharya as Raj
- Ipshita Mukherjee as Riya, Jhontu's sister
- Kaushik Chakraborty as Pakai Pandey

== Production ==
=== Announcement and development ===
The film was announced with an announcement teaser on 14 February 2025, on the occasion of Ankush's birthday and coinciding with Valentine's Day. The first poster of Nari Choritro Bejay Jotil was released on 8 March 2025, on the occasion of International Women's Day. The title of the film has been adapted from Uttam Kumar’s last film Ogo Bodhu Shundori, which had a song titled Nari Choritro Bejay Jotil. This marked the second production venture of Ankush Hazra Motion Pictures after Mirza: Part 1 – Joker (2024).

== Soundtrack ==
Track listing
No.	Title	Lyrics	Music	Singer(s)	Length
1.	"Kata Phutese"	Riju Das	B Show	B Show, Rubai	2:54
2.	"Danda 2.0"	Subhashish China Das	Avishek Saha	Silajit Majumder	4:17
3.	"Nari Choritro Bejay Jotil (Title Track)"	Ritam Sen	Ishan Mitra	Ishan Mitra	3:01
4.	"Shono Go Dokhino Hawa" (Composed by S. D. Burman)	Meera Dev Burman	Ishan Mitra	Durnibar Saha, Somlata Acharyya Chowdhury	3:22
Total length:					13:34

== Marketing ==
The teaser of the film was released on 10 December 2025. The trailer of Nari Choritro Bejay Jotil was released at Globe Cinema in Kolkata on 29 December 2025. The event was attended by all the cast and crew members of the film. The makers have conducted a Bengal Tour across multiple cities in West Bengal prior to its release. The promotional event organized at Balurghat on 5 January 2026 also marked the release of another song from the film, titled "Shono Go Dokhino Hawa".

== Release ==
Nari Choritro Bejay Jotil released in the theatres on 9 January 2026, coinciding with Saraswati Puja 2026.

== Reception ==
=== Critical reception ===
Poorna Banerjee of The Times of India rated the film 3.5/5 stars and wrote "Nari Choritro Bejay Jotil is a film that blends fantasy, romance and social commentary, while staying rooted in mainstream entertainment. Beneath its humour and fantasy, the film attempts to comment on how patriarchy often views feminism through a skewed lens, refusing to acknowledge women’s worth beyond the matrimonial bed." She praised the witty and fast-paced screenplay by Sreejib, sharp dialogues, situational humour, Ankush's performance, Debraj and Oindrila in their respective roles, the humorous plot twists, the vibrant cinematography and the music but bemoaned certain "absurd developments" in the plot towards the climax.

Shatakshi Ganguly of IWMBuzzz rated the film 4/5 stars and opined "The mind-reading becomes an initiator for deeper conversations. With every flabbergasting twist, it holds up a mirror to society—challenging rooted patriarchy and championing the often overlooked and ignored brilliance of women." She applauded Ankush and Oindrila's chemistry, the supporting cast's performance, the well written jokes and the well-paced screenplay.
