= Sohag Sen =

Indian actress

- Born: August 7, 1946
- Occupations: Actress; director
- Years active: 1969—Present
- Spouse: Pinaki Bhattacharya (m. 1966; death 2008)
- Children: 1
- Relatives: Harisadhan Dasgupta (maternal uncle); Raja Dasgupta (maternal cousin)

Sohag Sen (Bengali: সোহাগ সেন) is a Bengali theater actress, director and casting director. As an actress, her first professional job was Utpal Dutt's drama Leniner Daak. She began her career as a director in 1978 and formed her own theatre group Ensemble in 1983.

== Career ==
She is a visiting faculty of the Satyajit Ray Film and Television Institute and Rabindra Bharati University, and is the Head of the Department of the Direction Course in KFTI. She regularly conducts acting workshops for directors such as Aparna Sen, Buddhadeb Dasgupta, Rituparno Ghosh, Anjan Dutta and others, and has been the casting director for Mira Nair’s film, The Namesake. She also trains presenters for varied Media houses like Big FM and Kolkata TV.

As an actor, Sohag Sen started her career under the guidance of Utpal Dutta, in 1969, and since then, has had a wide variety of roles in Bengali stage plays, also directing a number of them. She has also acted in films, with directors such as Chidananda Dasgupta, Rituparno Ghosh, Anjan Dutta, and Roland Joffe.

== Direction ==
Sohag Sen's association with theater and allied media spans a period of almost forty years. She started her career as a director in 1978 and formed her own theatre ensemble in 1983. In fact, she is the second woman director in Bengali theater history, after Tripti Mitra, and has directed plays by dramatists as varied as Mahesh Elkunchwar and Botho Strauss. Her contribution to theater has been recognized by awards, including the Paschim Banga Natya Akademi Award for Theatrical Excellence, and the Lebedov Award.

== Filmography ==
- Mr. and Mrs. Iyer (2002)
- The Namesake (2006)
- Shob Charitro Kalponik (2009)
- The Japanese Wife (2010)
- Hrid Majharey (2014)
- Buno Haansh (2014)
- Belaseshe (2015)
- Manojder Adbhut Bari (2018)
- Avijatrik (2021)
- Chabiwala: The Keysmith (2021)
- Godhuli Alap (2022 - 2023 )
- Love Marriage (2023)
- Duggamoni O Baghmama (2025)
- Nari Choritro Bejay Jotil (2026)
