= Mayurpankhi =

Indian television series

- Genre: Romance Drama
- Written by: Leena Gangopadhyay
- Directed by: Snehasis Jana
- Creative director: Chandrashekhar Chakraborty
- Presented by: Bright Advertising Pvt. Ltd.
- Starring: Sohini Guha Roy; Soumya Mukherjee
- Theme music composer: Debjyoti Mishra
- Opening theme: Mayurpankhi Shopney Deoa Naam
- Country of origin: India
- Original language: Bengali
- No. of seasons: 1
- No. of episodes: 308

Production
- Executive producers: Debolina Mukhopadhyay; Sumit Kumar Roy; Taniya, Nilanjan (Star Jalsha)
- Producer: Saibal Banerjee
- Production locations: Kolkata; Howrah; Taki; Kashi
- Cinematography: Madhab Nashkar
- Editors: Sameer; Soumen
- Camera setup: Multi-camera
- Running time: 22 minutes (approx.)
- Production company: Magic Moments Motion Pictures

Original release
- Network: Star Jalsha
- Release: 12 November 2018 – 22 September 2019

Mayurpankhi is an Indian Bengali television soap opera that premiered on 12 November 2018, and aired on Bengali General Entertainment Channel Star Jalsha, and is also available on the digital platform Hotstar. The show was produced by Magic Moments Motion Pictures of Saibal Banerjee and Leena Gangopadhyay.

The show starred Sohini Guha Roy (of Colors Bangla's show "Resham Jhanpi" fame) and Soumya Mukherjee (who had previously acted in a Hoichoi web series). The show explores the star crossed romance of Tisham and Souradeep who struggle to unite for their love under adverse circumstances.

== Premise ==
The story is set against the backdrop of Durga Puja, where beautiful and talented singer Tisham snips away Souradip's heart at first sight. The dramatic and romantic first meeting is one to remember, but fate has some other plans for the two. They are separated only to reunite. Mayurpankhi is a story of two souls and their struggle for love against all odds under diverse circumstances.

== Cast ==
=== Main ===
- Sohini Guha Roy as Tisham Sen (formerly Ghosh) (née Mitra) – Souradeep's wife, Shyam's former wife, Nilambar and Reshma's daughter (till his death)
- Soumya Mukherjee as Souradeep Sen a.k.a. Papan – Tisham's husband

=== Recurring ===
- Sabitri Chatterjee as Kamalini Sen – Souradeep's paternal grandmother, Raja and Paltu's mother, Bhombol's aunt
- Santu Mukherjee as Debshankar Sen a.k.a. Bhombol – Souradeep's elder paternal uncle, Protima's husband, Bubu's father, Samyo's father-in-law
- Rita Dutta Chakraborty as Protima Sen – Souradeep's elder aunt and foster mother, Bhombol's wife, Bubu's mother, Samyo's mother-in-law
- Kaushik Chakraborty as Rajdeep Sen a.k.a. Raja – Souradeep and Mitul's father, Souradeep's late mother and Malobika's husband, a businessman
- Tramila Bhattacharya as Malobika Sen – Raja's second wife, Souradeep and Mitul's stepmother. She is egocentric, diplomatic, dominating and quarrelsome in nature, and insults others.
- Biswanath Basu as Paltu Sen – Souradeep's younger paternal uncle who deeply cares for him and is like a friend to him. He is Kamalini's son and Annapurna's husband. He became a successful businessman.
- Tithi Bose as Annapurna Sen (née Dutta) – Paltu's wife, introduced as an innocent but outgoing comic character.
- Rajanya Mitra as Shreyashee Lahiri (née Sen) a.k.a. Bubu – Souradeep's elder paternal cousin sister, Bhombol-Protima's daughter, Samyo's wife.
- Suman Banerjee as Samyo Lahiri – Bubu's husband, Souradeep's elder brother-in-law and Bhombol-Protima's son-in-law.
- Soumi Banerjee as Shatabdi Sen a.k.a. Mitul – Souradeep's younger sister, Raja's daughter with his first wife.
- Nilankur Mukhopadhyay as Tamoghna Dutta a.k.a. Bublu – Kamalini's daughter's son, and Raja and Paltu's sororal nephew who lives with the Sen family. He is Souradeep's younger paternal cousin brother and Jhimli's love interest turned husband.

- Abhishek Chatterjee as Nilambar Mitra – Tisham's once estranged father. After his wife Reshma died, he passed upon Bablu the duty to raise Tisham and went to Kashi to live a spiritual life there. Later he helped Souradeep in rescuing Tisham and returned to Kolkata to support Tisham.
- Chandan Sen as Sameer Bose a.k.a. Bablu – Tisham's maternal uncle (who raised her), Mitali's husband, Jhimli's father. He is a school teacher.
- Laboni Sarkar as Mitali Bose – Tisham's aunt (Bablu's wife), Jhimli's mother. She is greedy, eccentric, finicky and barbaric by nature.
- Sonal Mishra as Jhimli Dutta (née Bose) – Tisham's younger cousin sister, Bablu-Mitali's daughter, Bublu's love interest turned wife

- Tathagata Mukherjee as Shyam Sundar Ghosh a.k.a. Shyam – Tisham's ex-husband. He was a drunkard and had a secret romantic/sexual relationship with his sister-in-law Kadambari. He developed a liking for Tisham, however, died in a road accident.
- Debolina Mukherjee as Kadambari Ghosh – Shyam's sister-in-law (his elder brother's wife). Her husband became mentally deranged and was admitted to a mental hospital after their wedding on seeing the growing proximity of his wife with his brother Shyam. Kadambari regulates Shyam's household and enticed him as well.
- Sreela Majumder as Shakuntala Ghosh – Shyam's mother, Tisham's former mother-in-law. She is kind-hearted and caring towards Tisham, but has been suppressed to give her views by her other family members.
- Sandip Dey as Bishnu Shankar Ghosh – Shyam's father, Tisham's former father-in-law. He is affluent but orthodox and uncultured.
- Chitra Sen as Bholadasi Dutta – Annapurna's paternal grandmother.
- Rajasree Bhowmick as Mishtu's mother
