= Anashua Majumdar =

Indian actress

Anusuya Majumdar
- Anusuya Majumdar
- Citizenship: Indian
- Education: Loreto College, Kolkata
- Occupation: Actress
- Spouse: Subrata Majumder

Anashua Majumdar is an Indian actress who works in Bengali-language films, TV shows and theater.

== Filmography ==
- Mahaprithibi (1991)
- City of Joy (1992)
- Tahader Katha (1992)
- Pashanda Pandit (1993)
- Bhalo Theko (2003)
- Chitrangada: The Crowning Wish (2012)
- Mrs. Sen (2013)
- Kagojer Nouka (2013)
- Gangster (2016)
- Maati (2018)
- Mukherjee Dar Bou (2019)
- Gotro (2019)
- Aparajito (2022)
- Byadh (2022)
- Boudi Canteen (2022)
- Raktabeej (2023)
- Shontaan (2024)
- OCD (2026)
- Bhanupriya Bhooter Hotel (2026)
- Winkle Twinkle (2026)

== Television ==
Year	Serial	Channel	Character	Notes
1999	Shyaola	Zee Bangla	Kamalika Sinha Roy	
2008	Mohona	Zee Bangla		
2006 - 2009	Rani Kahini	Zee Bangla	Miss	
2009 - 2012	Bou Kotha Kao	Star Jalsha	Niharika	
2009 - 2013	Binni Dhaner Khoi	Colors Bangla	Anwara Bibi	
2013 - 2014	Sokhi	Star Jalsha	Rama Sanyal	
2013 - 2015	Jol Nupur	Star Jalsha	Radharani	
2014 - 2016	Tumi Robe Nirobe	Zee Bangla	Jaya	
2015 - 2016	Kojagori	Zee Bangla	Rashmoni Mitra	
2015 - 2016	Chokher Tara Tui	Star Jalsha	Umrao Jaan	
2015	Ichche Nodee	Star Jalsha	Malobika's Mother	
2016 - 2017	Ei Chheleta Bhelbheleta	Zee Bangla	Jaan	
2016 - 2018	Kusum Dola	Star Jalsha	Nayan Mani	
2017 - 2018	Kundo Phooler Mala	Star Jalsha	Angshu's step-mother	
2017 - 2018	Andarmahal	Zee Bangla	Kundanandini Bose	
2017	Gachkouto	Colors Bangla	Chitra	
2019 - 2020	Mohor	Star Jalsha	Malobika Roy chowdhury	(later replaced by Moumita Gupta)
2020	Jiyon Kathi	Sun Bangla		
2020	Kora Pakhi	Star Jalsha	Radharani Banerjee	(later replaced by Moumita Gupta)
2020 - 2021	Desher Maati	Star Jalsha	Sharmila Mukherjee	
2022 - 2023	Ekka Dokka	Star Jalsha	Binodini Sengupta	
2023 - 2024	Jol Thoi Thoi Bhalobasha	Star Jalsha	Kojagori's mother in law	
2025 - 2026	Chirosakha	Star Jalsha	Lokkhimoni; Kamalini's mother in law	
2026 -Present	Dulari	Zee Bangla	Promita Debi; Dulari's grandmother	

== Awards ==
Year	Award	Category	Character	Name
2018	Zee Bangla Sonar Sansar	Priyo Sashuri	Kundonandini	Andarmahal
2024	Tele Cine Awards	Best Actress in a Supporting Role	Gouri Mukherjee	Raktabeej
2026	Star Jalsha Paribaar Awards	Priyo Sashuri	Lokkhimoni	Chirosokha
