= Ei Chheleta Bhelbheleta =

Indian Bengali TV series

- Genre: Drama; Romance
- Created by: Magic Moments Motion Pictures
- Written by: Leena Gangopadhyay
- Directed by: Saibal Banerjee
- Starring: Prapti Chatterjee; Somraj Maity; Nabanita Malakar
- Country of origin: India
- Original language: Bengali
- No. of episodes: 478

Production
- Producer: Saibal Banerjee
- Production location: Kolkata
- Camera setup: Multi-camera
- Running time: 22 minutes
- Production company: Magic Moments Motion Pictures

Original release
- Network: Zee Bangla
- Release: 28 March 2016 – 23 July 2017

Ei Chheleta Bhelbheleta (transl. This boy is fidgety) a Bengali television Drama Series that premiered on 28 March 2016 to 23 July 2017 and aired on Zee Bangla. The show was produced by Magic Moments Motion Pictures, it starred Prapti Chatterjee and Somraj Maity in lead roles, Nabanita Malakar, Sabitri Chatterjee, Anusuya Majumdar, Shankar Chakraborty and Bharat Kaul in supporting roles. The show got replaced by a show Karunamoyee Rani Rashmoni.

== Plot ==
The show's unique name has been taken from common Bengali childhood rhyme. It truly captures the free-spirited love and chemistry between the protagonists - Abir and Shaluk. Life takes a turn when introvert city-bred boy 'Abir' meets the vivacious village girl 'Shaluk'. Their unusual friendship clicks in an instant and soon a sweet innocent chemistry develops between the two. Soon they realize their feelings towards each other. Thus, starts the story of their 'first love'. 'Eii Chhele Ta Bhelbhele Ta' is a tale of love, which follows the protagonists through myriad of situations and sees them unite against all odds. The story showcases a pure love story between two teenagers and how their love matures over time and rises above the different obstacles of life.

Two years leap

Two years later, Aishwarya is jailed and then after some days Shaluk becomes pregnant. There is happiness back In Shaluk's family. Later, Aishwarya makes a comeback as a new avatar of Shoroshoti to ruin Shaluk's happiness. She then tries to kill Shaluk. Later Shaluk is hospitalized and gives birth to a baby boy and Aishwarya's true colors are revealed in front of everyone.

== Cast ==
=== Main ===
- Prapti Chatterjee as Shaluk- Abir's wife
- Somraj Maity as Abir- Shaluk's husband

=== Recurring ===
- Nabanita Malakar as Aishwarya aka Mimi
- Sabitri Chatterjee as Shaluk's maternal grandmother
- Anusuya Majumdar as Jaan - Abir's paternal grandmother
- Rita Dutta Chakraborty as Shaluk's maternal aunt
- Shaktipada Dey as Shaluk's maternal uncle
- Shankar Chakraborty as Tirtha-Abir's father
- Rajasree Bhowmick as Kamalini, Abir's mother
- Bharat Kaul as Abinash Sen - Shaluk and Aishwariya's father, a doctor
- Ritoja Majumder as Aishwariya's mother
- Suchismita Chowdhury as Nilanjana, Akash and Pupe's mother, Dipu's wife
- Surajit Banerjee as Dipu-Akash and Pupe's father, Abir's younger paternal uncle
- Diganta Bagchi as Bublu- Abir's youngest paternal uncle, a doctor
- Samata Das as Bublu's wife
- Ayesha Bhattacharya as Pupe aka Pupe Didi, Abir’s cousin
- Debolina Mukherjee as Dighi aka Ful Di
- Debjani Chakraborty as Nodi aka Ranga Di
- Anindya Chatterjee as Shourya- Dighi's ex-husband
- Anindita Saha Kapileshwari as Shourya's fake mother
- Rahul Chakraborty as Shourya's fake father
- Rajanya Mitra as Sonali
- Suman Banerjee as Partha - Nodi's husband
- Chhanda K Chatterjee as Partha's mother
- Prantik Banerjee as Soumya - Dighi's second husband
