= Icche Putul =

2023 Indian Bengali television series

- Genre: Drama; Romance
- Created by: Organic Studios
- Screenplay by: Sarbari Ghoshal
- Story by: Leena Gangopadhyay
- Directed by: Joydeep Karmakar
- Creative director: Leena Gangopadhyay
- Starring: Mainak Banerjee; Titiksha Das; Sweta Mishra
- Theme music composer: Amit Chattarjee
- Opening theme: by Anweshaa
- Country of origin: India
- Original language: Bengali
- No. of episodes: 326

Production
- Executive producers: Sanjoy Chakraborty (Organic Studios); Paromita & Aniruddha Ghosh (Zee Bangla)
- Producer: Arko Ganguly
- Cinematography: Poromatma Yadav
- Editor: Sampriti Chakraborty
- Camera setup: Multi camera
- Running time: 22 minutes
- Production company: Organic Studios

Original release
- Network: Zee Bangla
- Release: 30 January 2023 – 9 March 2024

Ichche Putul (transl. Wish Doll) is a Bengali language television series which aired on Zee Bangla. The series premiered from 30 January 2023 and concluded on 9 March 2024. It was produced by Arka Ganguly under the banner Organic Studios. This debut project of Organic Studios had bagged the category of achieving the highest online views. It starred Mainak Banerjee, Titiksha Das and Sweta Mishra in lead roles.

== Plot ==
The story revolves around sisters, Megh and Mayuri Roy, and how their destiny leads them to fall for the same man, Souroneel Ganguly.

Megh is a university student, pursuing masters. Mayuri, Megh's elder sister is chronically ill since childhood, which requires her to frequently get blood transfusion, the blood for which can only be donated by Megh. In her family no one cares about her except her father Anindya. Mayuri was matchmade with Souryaneel, Megh's professor.But, Megh and Souryaneel were already in love with each other. So, Souryaneel schemed to marry Megh instead of Mayuri, which he eventually succeeded in doing. As a result, Souroneel's family hates her. Again, Mayuri plots against Megh to humiliate her in the family, so that she can take revenge to cheat her. So, Megh and Souryaneel becomes separated. Then Jishnu enters Megh's life as her friend. Again with the instigation of Mayuri, Souroneel and his family misunderstands her and Jishnu. Souryaneel's sister Gini loves Rup and marries him. Rup previously had a conflict with Megh. So Mayuri uses Rup to harass Megh again. On the other hand, after marriage, Rup and his mother Shalini used to torture Gini. At last, Megh saves Gini and everyone learned of Mayuri's ill mind and asks pardon to Megh. But Megh ignores them and finally gets divorced with Souroneel. Then, Gini and Jishnu fall for each other.After few days Rup and Mayuri plots a scandal in the name of Megh.Megh totally destroyed and tries to commit suicide. Somehow Megh survived.Finally, Megh and Souryaneel's family plans to have Megh and Souryaneel marry without their knowledge. On the wedding day, Mayuri plans to kill Megh but Megh manages to survive. Later Mayuri gets arrested. Mayuri becomes sick and Megh saves her. Mayuri understands her fault and changes.

== Cast ==
=== Main ===
- Titiksha Das as Megh Roy - Neel's wife; Mayuri's younger sister; Anindya and Madhumita's younger daughter.
- Mainak Banerjee as Souroneel Ganguly aka Neel - Megh's husband; Moyuri's ex-fiancé, Tridib and Meenakshi's son; Mini's elder brother; Bhaskar and Sejuti's nephew; Laal and Gini's elder cousin brother; Madhabilata's elder grandson.
- Shweta Mishra as Moyuri Roy (at last repents for her misdeeds and changes for good)- A chronically ill person (most possibly Thalassemia patient); Megh's elder sister and rival, Neel's ex-fiancée and obsessive lover, Anindya and Madhumita's elder daughter

=== Recurring ===
- Shamik Chakraborty as Jishnu Sen - Megh's friend; Amar Chakraborty's student; Gini's lover
- Kalyani Mondal as Madhabilata Ganguly - Ganguly family's matriarch; Neel, Lal, Mini and Gini's paternal grandmother; Tridib and Bhaskar's mother
- Saswati Guha Thakurata as Dr. Minakshi Ganguly - Neel and Mini's mother; Tridib's wife; Lal and Gini's aunt
- Saumya Sengupta as Dr. Tridib Ganguly - Neel and Mini's father; Madhabilata's elder son, Minakshi's husband; Bhaskar's elder brother; Lal and Mini's uncle
- Abhijeet Debroy as Dr. Bhaskar Ganguly - Madhabilata's younger son, Sejuti's husband, Lal and Gini's father; Neel and Mini's uncle
- Anindita Saha Kapileshwari as Sejuti Ganguly - Bhaskar's wife; Lal and Gini's mother; Neel and Mini's aunt
- Aishi Bhattacharya as Patrali Ganguly aka Gini - Lal's sister; Rup's ex-wife; Bhaskar and Sejuti's daughter; Neel and Mini's cousin sister; Tridib and Minakshi's niece; Jishnu's lover
- Diyettima Ganguly / Sonalisa Das as Manaswini Ganguly aka Mini - Neel's sister; Tridib and Minakshi's daughter; Lal and Gini's cousin sister; Bhaskar and Sejuti's niece
- Poonam Basak as Punam - Megh's classmate and Mayuri's well wisher, Megh's rival
- Chhandak Choudhury as Subhroneel Ganguly aka Lal - Bhaskar and Sejuti's son; Gini's brother; Neel and Mini's cousin brother
- Soma Banerjee as Madhumita Roy - Megh and Mayuri's mother; Anindya's wife
- Krishnakishore Mukherjee as Anindya Roy - Megh and Mayuri's father
- Fahim Mirza as Rupankar Sanyal aka Rup- Mayuri's friend and partner-in-crime; Megh's enemy; Gini's abusive ex-husband; Sukanta and Shalini's son
- Malobika Sen as Shalini Sanyal - Rup's mother
- Rahul Chakraborty as Sukanta Sanyal - Rup's father
- Sumanta Mukherjee as Pandit Amar Chakraborty - Megh and Jishnu's music teacher
- Indrakshi Nag as Maithili - Gini's lawyer and well wisher
- Chaitali Das as Priyanka - Relative of the Roy family

== Reception ==
TRP ratings for 2023
| Week | BARC viewership | | Ref. |
| Week | TRP | Rank | Ref. |
|---|---|---|---|
| Week 32 | 5.4 | 10 | |
| Week 40 | 5.6 | 10 | |
| Week 41 | 5.4 | 9 | |
| Week 42 | 5.4 | 10 | |
| Week 43 | 5.1 | 8 | |
| Week 44 | 6.2 | 7 | |
| Week 45 | 6.1 | 8 | |
| Week 46 | 5.2 | 10 | |
| Week 47 | 5.9 | 8 | |
| Week 48 | 5.7 | 13 | |
| Week 49 | 5.6 | 11 | |
| Week 50 | 5.0 | 11 | |
| Week 51 | 6.1 | 13 | |

TRP ratings for 2024
| Week | BARC viewership | | Ref. |
| Week | TRP | Rank | Ref. |
|---|---|---|---|
| Week 1 | 6.1 | 10 | |
| Week 2 | 5.8 | 10 | |
| Week 3 | 6.0 | 12 | |
| Week 4 | 5.7 | 12 | |
| Week 5 | 5.4 | 13 | |
