= Ekka Dokka =

Bengali drama television series

- Genre: Family drama; Romance; Medical drama
- Created by: Leena Gangopadhyay
- Developed by: Magic Moments Motion Pictures
- Starring: Saptarshi Maulik; Sonamoni Saha Pratik Sen; Chandan Sen; Aparajita Ghosh Das; Dulal Lahiri; Badshah Moitra
- Country of origin: India
- Original language: Bengali
- No. of episodes: 430

Production
- Producers: Leena Gangopadhyay; Saibal Banerjee
- Production location: Kolkata
- Camera setup: Multi-camera
- Running time: 22 minutes
- Production company: Magic Moments Motion Pictures

Original release
- Network: Star Jalsha
- Release: 18 July 2022 – 24 September 2023

Related
- Jol Thoi Thoi Bhalobasha

Ekka Dokka (transl. One, Two) is a medical drama television series that premiered on Bengali general entertainment channel Star Jalsha from 18 July 2022. Produced by Magic Moments Motion Pictures, the show has an ensemble cast consisting of Saptarshi Maulik, Sonamoni Saha, Pratik Sen, Aparajita Ghosh Das and Sudip Mukherjee.

== Plot ==
Pokhraj Sengupta (Saptarshi Maulik) and Radhika Majumdar (Sonamoni Saha) are medical students at the college & hospital managed by the Sengupta family. Radhika and Pokhraj are childhood friends and classmates who are extremely competitive in studies. They do not miss an opportunity to belittle each other, influenced by the acrimony between their respective families. In reality, Pokhraj and Radhika love each other from childhood but the inharmonious relationship between their respective families makes them wary to admit it as well as creates several misunderstandings between the two.

A conspiracy sets off a chain reaction of events and incidents. Circumstances influence Radhika to intentionally marry Pokhraj that ultimately leads to a divorce. Lack of maturity and communication make way for continued accusations and misunderstandings that influences Radhika's decision to pursue her internship at an alternate hospital under the guidance of Dr Anirban Guha (Pratik Sen). Dr. Guha is a highly respected doctor, but he is also feared by many for his caustic personality.

== Cast ==
=== Main ===
- Saptarshi Maulik as Dr. Pokhraj Sengupta- Radhika's ex-husband; Ranjabati's husband; Ronodip and Sharmistha's only son (2022 – 2023)
- Sonamoni Saha as Dr. Radhika Guha (née Majumder) (formerly Sengupta): Kushal and Sudakshina's younger daughter; Pokhraj’s ex-wife; Anirban's wife (2022 – 2023)
- Pratik Sen as Dr. Anirban Guha: A well-known neurologist; Jyotirmay and Suchismita's son; Piyali's stepson; Radhika's husband (2023)
- Aparajita Ghosh Das as Ankita Bose (née Majumder): A law student; Kushal and Sudakshina's elder daughter; Radhika's elder sister; Saumyadeep's wife (2022 – 2023)
- Swapnila Chakraborty as Ranjabati "Ranja" Pokhraj Sengupta: Pokhraj's wife (2023)

=== Others ===
- Sayanta Modak as Pallav Mukherjee aka Paul-Radhika and Pokhraj's classmate, Radhika's friend who is in love with her (2022)
- Roshni Tanwi Bhattacharya as Kamalini: Anirban's one-sided obsessive lover (2023)
- Ashok Bhattacharya as Dr. Kalikrishna Sengupta – Pokhraj's grandfather, patriarch of the Sengupta family (2022 – 2023)
- Anashua Majumdar as Binodini Sengupta – Pokhraj's grandmother (Antagonist) (2022 – 2023)
- Moyna Mukherjee as Sharmistha Sengupta - Pokhraj's mother (2022 – 2023)
- Bhaskar Banerjee as Dr. Ronodip Sengupta – Pokhraj's father, Sharmistha's husband, Pupe's former love interest (2022 – 2023)
- Sudip Mukherjee as Dr. Subhadip Sengupta –Pokhraj's uncle (Antagonist) (2022 – 2023)
- Anindita Raychaudhury as Tamali Sengupta – Pokhraj's paternal aunt (Antagonist) (2022 – 2023)
- Antara Pakira Nandy as Indira Sengupta - Pokhraj's paternal aunt (2022 – 2023)
- Diganta Bagchi as Biswadip Sengupta – Pokhraj's paternal uncle (Antagonist) (2022 – 2023)
- Aishi Bhattacharya as Arushi Sengupta - Pokhraj's cousin (Antagonist) (2022)
- Priyanka Mitra as Srija Sengupta – Pokhraj's cousin (Antagonist) (2022)
- Sujoy Saha as Kohinur Sengupta- Bublu’s husband, Pokhraj's cousin (2022 – 2023)
- Krittika Chakraborty as Ashmi Sengupta - Pokhraj's youngest cousin (2022)
- Chandan Sen as Kushal Majumder- Radhika's father (2022 – 2023)
- Subhadra Mukherjee / Anushree Das as Manini Guha- Anirban's aunt (2023)
- Tanushree Goswami as Nandita Roy (née Sengupta) – Pokhraj's aunt and Shreyan's mother (Antagonist) (2022)
- Aritram Mukherjee as Shreyan Roy – Ankita's former love-interest, Pokhraj's cousin brother (Antagonist) (2022)
