= Jogajog (2015 film) =

2015 Indian Bengali film

- Theatrical release poster
- Directed by: Sekhar Das
- Story by: Rabindranath Tagore
- Based on: Jogajog by Rabindranath Tagore
- Produced by: Navratan Jhawar
- Starring: See below
- Cinematography: Indranil Mukherjee
- Edited by: Sankha
- Music by: Pandit Debojyoti Bose
- Production company: Ratanshree Nirman Pvt. Ltd.
- Release date: 8 May 2015
- Country: India
- Language: Bengali

Jogajog (transl. Communication) is a 2015 Bengali film adaptation of Rabindranath Tagore's 1929 novel of the same name directed by Sekhar Das.

== Cast ==
- Shuvolagna Mukherjee as Kumudini
- Bratya Basu as Madhusudan
- Ananya Chatterjee as Shyamasundari
- Locket Chatterjee as Rimi
- Arjun Chakraborty as Bipradas
- Barun Chanda as Kalu Mukherjee
- Saheb Chatterjee as Nabin
- Saptarshi Roy as Akhil
- Sujoy Prasad Chatterjee as Amulya
- Biswajit Chakraborty
- Lily Chakraborty

== Music ==
Jogajog

Soundtrack album by Pandit Debojyoti Bose
- Released: 2015
- Genre: Feature film soundtrack

Pandit Debojyoti Bose chronology
Nayan Chapar Dinratri	Jogajog

Pandit Debojyoti Bose was chosen to compose the music of Jogajog. Singer Shreya Ghoshal was reported to record a bhajan for the film. Other playback singers for the film include Jayati Chakraborty, Kaushiki Chakrabarty, Arjun Chakraborty and Saheb Chatterjee.
