= Andarmahal =

Bengali Soap Opera

- Promotional Image
- Genre: Soap opera
- Created by: Magic Moments Motion Pictures
- Screenplay by: Leena Gangopadhyay
- Directed by: Saibal Banerjee; Arunava Adhikary
- Creative director: Leena Gangopadhyay
- Presented by: Bright Advertising Pvt. Ltd.
- Starring: Koneenica Banerjee; See below: Cast
- Opening theme: "Andarmahal" "Parameshwari" by Anweshaa
- Composer: Debojyoti Mishra
- Country of origin: India
- Original language: Bengali
- No. of seasons: 1
- No. of episodes: 366

Production
- Executive producers: Sumit Kumar Roy; Satyajit Chakraborty (Magic Moments)
- Producer: Saibal Banerjee
- Production locations: Kolkata; Asansol; Kalimpong
- Cinematography: Siddhartha Mukherjee
- Editors: Sameer; Soumen
- Camera setup: Multi-Camera
- Running time: 22 minutes (approx.)
- Production company: Magic Moments Motion Pictures

Original release
- Network: Zee Bangla
- Release: 5 June 2017 – 9 November 2018

Andarmahal was a Bengali television soap opera that premiered on 5 June 2017 and initially aired Monday to Friday at 10:30 PM IST on Zee Bangla. It had been later shifted to the 9:30 pm time slot. The show is produced by Magic Moments Motion Pictures, and started Koneenica Banerjee and Kaushik Chakraborty in the lead roles and Debolina Dutta, child actress Ashmi, Santu Mukherjee and Rita Dutta Chakraborty among others in prominent supporting roles.It went off air on 9 November 2018 and it got replaced by Nokshi Kantha.

This show marked the return of actress Koneenica on Bengali Television after more than a decade. Koneenica, who was last seen in the role of Megh in the ETV Bangla serial, "Kokhono Megh Kokhono Brishti" (opposite Badshah Moitra) and as Brishti in Zee Bangla's serial "Raat Bhor Brishti" (opposite Saswata Chatterjee), played the lead role of "Parameshwari", an ordinary girl with an extraordinary talent of music, who fights through all odds to establish herself as an ideal daughter-in-law and lovable mother to Juju, her husband's daughter from previous marriage. The show, written by Leena Gangopadhyay, focused on the journey of Parameshwari, an average housewife who struggles through the rules and regulations of a joint family to become self-dependent utilizing her passion for music as a career.

== Plot ==
Andarmahal is the tale of an average middle-aged woman named Parameshwari who had to give up on her formal education to support family expenses and her sisters' studies. She harbors a deep connect with music that gives her some solace in her lonely life, consisting mainly of her family, housework and her music school that she runs at home. She gets engaged and subsequently married to Abhimanyu Bose, a divorcee man in his early forties who has a teenage daughter, Juju from his previous marriage with Ananya. He marries Parameshwari at the condition that she will have to look after her daughter Juju and care for her, gaining her trust as a mother and will also have to handle the housework. In return, he will give her financial stability and security. Despite such humiliating treaty as the foundation of their marriage, Parameshwari, without any expectations from Abhimanyu and his family members, gives her utmost effort to win Juju's heart. She loves Juju as her real mother would and later, being touched by her selfless love, Juju to begins to love and respect her new mother Parameshwari whom she fondly calls "Mamoni". However, this makes Ananya, Juju's real mother insecure and she fears about losing her daughter. So, she entices Abhimanyu, tries to reconnect their relationship and Ananya begins living at Abhimanyu's household, much to Juju's embarrassment. After Paro helps her father-in-law understand his faults regarding house management and his relationship with his wife, her father-in-law, realizing his mistakes, begins to support Parameshwari. He asks Abhimanyu to show Ananya the door, but Abhimanyu revolts and due to his misconception that Parameshwari was involved in an illicit affair with his boss and her senior from college, Juboraj Sengupta, and due to repeated instigation from Parameshwari's ill-wishes Kamalini, Shreya and Katha; Abhimanyu further misunderstands Parameshwari and in a fit of rage, announces that he will divorce her. Juju stands by a heart-broken Parameshwari, and on her insistence and with Juboraj's help, starts her singing career to become self-dependent. Parameshwari Bose becomes a rising star and singing sensation overnight with the release of her first album and begins to actively contribute in running the family, when Abhimanyu becomes ill and loses his job. Taking Juboraj's help, Paro bears the entire expenses of Abhi's treatment; and Abhi finally realizes his mistake. He then asks Ananya to leave the house and starts his relationship with Parameshwari afresh.

=== Parallel tracks ===
In addition to Parameshwari's struggle, the series has also been showcasing parallel story arcs of Parameshwari's sister-in-laws- Shreya and Katha. Shreya's husband, Karna utterly humiliates her and cheats on her by trying to woo a sub-ordinate nurse at his workplace. When Shreya gets to know about the matter, Karna doesn't feel like giving her any explanation, for she is financially dependent on him. Shreya realizes that she can't patch up with Karna anymore by sacrificing her self-pride and decides to work on her. Paro supports Shreya in her tough time, by helping her get a job to earn a living. Shreya realizes her previous mistakes in the wrongs done by her to Parameshwari, and the two sort out their differences.

Katha develops a fatal disease and much to her shock and amazement, his doting husband Arghya and mother-in-law, Kamalini star misbehaving with her and taunt her for being a burden. Arghya doesn't anymore allow Katha to share a room with him as her disease is infectious. And a distraught Katha has to make her way to the store room, when even her own family refuses to stand by her. Parameshwari, however, forgiving all of Katha's previous misdeeds, lends a helping hand towards her in her times of need. Katha too whole-heartedly apologizes to Parameshwari, who becomes her emotional strength and inspiration, while she starts preparing for the I.A.S. exam to get a fresh job. Arghya, then, enters into a relationship with his colleague, Sreeradha, further hurting Katha, who now, following Parameshwari's footsteps, protests and decides to teach Arghya a lesson.

=== Parameshwari's dilemma ===
Some days after Abhimanyu gets a new job, Ananya visits him and informs him that she has decided to file a case in the court over the rights for Juju's custody. So that Abhi and the family doesn't have to go through the legal procedures and resultant degradation of their social prestige, Parameshwari keeping a heavy heart, asks Juju to leave the house and live with her mother Ananya till she becomes 18 years old, 3 years later. Juju is shattered and extremely disheartened at Paro's request, however obliges her by leaving the house with Ananya. Ananya who is a perfectionist thoughtlessly imposes her rules and regulations over the child Juju, who perceive that no one, even Paro, is her near one and well-wisher and goes into a life of self-imposed salvation in Anaya's house. Paro repents her decision of sending Juju away and when the latter pays no heed to her earnest calls and repeated words for forgiveness, a remorseful Paro decides to withdraw herself from singing so that she can penance for the "sin" she did by hurting her child, Juju. Meanwhile, Abhimanyu proposes her to have a child together, but Paro declines his proposal. Her self-imposed starvation leads her health to decline to a dangerous extent, but, is nursed back to health by Juju. Paro and Juju now clear up all their misunderstandings, and Juju starts living with the family again, much to Ananya's chagrin. Meanwhile, Parameshwari receives the " Sharno Kontho " award.

== Cast ==
=== Main ===
- Koneenica Banerjee as Parameshwari Dutta a.k.a. Paro - Main Lead, Abhimanyu's second wife and Juju's step / adoptive mother. She is a popular singer.
- Kaushik Chakraborty as Abhimanyu Bose a.k.a. Abhi - Recurring Main Lead, Parameshwari's husband, Ananya's ex-husband and Juju's father.
- Ashmee Ghosh as Anushree Bose a.k.a. Juju - Parallel Lead, Abhimanyu and Ananya's daughter, Parameshwari's step / adoptive daughter

=== Recurring ===
- Santu Mukherjee as Debabrata Bose - Abhimanyu's father and Parameshwari's father-in-law.
- Anusuya Majumdar as Kundanandini Bose - Abhimanyu's mother and Parameshwari's mother-in-law.
- Debolina Dutta as Ananya Chatterjee- Abhimanyu's ex-wife- Tirtho's current wife and Juju's biological mother.
- Tathagata Mukherjee as Tirthankar Mukherjee a.k.a. Tirtho - Ananya's current husband.
- Chandan Sen as Amitabha Bose - Debabrata's brother and Abhimanyu's uncle, Kamalini's husband. He is Arghya's father and Katha's father-in-law.
- Rita Dutta Chakraborty as Kamalini Bose - Amitava's wife and Abhimanyu's aunt. She is Arghya's mother and Katha's mother-in-law.
- Rajanya Mitra as Shreya Bose- Karna's wife and Parameswari's elder sister in law.
- Rahul Chakraborty as Dr.Karna Bose - Debabrata and Kundanandini's elder son, Abhimanyu's brother and Shreya's husband
- Rajashree Bhowmik as Ranjana Bose - Abhimanyu's aunt, Kundanandini and Kamalini's sister-in-law
- Surojit Banerjee as Pinaki Bose - Ranjana's husband.
- Suman Banerjee as Arghya Bose - Amitava-Kamalini's son, Abhimanyu's younger cousin brother, Katha's husband.
- Debolina Mukherjee as Katha Bose - Arghya's wife and Parameshwari's younger sister-in-law.
- Sabitri Chatterjee as Swatilekha Dutta - Parameswari's elder paternal aunt.
- Chitra Sen as Siddeswari Dutta - Parameswari's mother.
- Anindita Sarkar as Rai - Parameswari's sister
- Arghya Mukherjee as Shiddartha - Rai's husband and Abhimanyu's office colleague
- Piyali Basu as Rani - Parameswari's sister
- Riyanka Dasgupta as Diya - Parameswari's younger sister
- Abhishek Chatterjee as Yuvraj Sengupta - Abhimanyu's former boss and Parameshwari's senior from college, who loves Parameshwari
- Bulbuli Choubey Panja as Sreeradha Basu- Arghya's colleague- whom Arghya wants to marry.

== See also ==
- Punyi Pukur - serial produced by the same production company
- Jol Nupur - serial produced by the same production company
- Phagun Bou - serial produced by the same production company
- Kusum Dola - serial produced by the same production company
- Magic Moments Motion Pictures - production company
