= Anusandhan (TV series) =

2025 Indian Bengali web series

- Release poster
- Genre: Psychological thriller; Crime thriller
- Created by: Samragnee Bandyopadhyay
- Written by: Samragnee Bandyopadhyay
- Screenplay by: Ayan Chakraborti
- Story by: Samragnee Bandyopadhyay
- Dialogues by: Samragnee Bandyopadhyay
- Directed by: Aditi Roy
- Starring: Subhashree Ganguly; Saheb Chatterjee
- Theme music composer: Nabarun Bose
- Composer: Nabarun Bose
- Country of origin: India
- Original language: Bengali
- No. of seasons: 1
- No. of episodes: 7

Production
- Cinematography: Ramyadeep Saha
- Editor: Subhajit Singha
- Camera setup: Single-camera
- Running time: 21-28 minutes
- Production company: Soma Pictures Production

Original release
- Release: 7 November 2025

Anusandhan (transl. Investigation) is a 2025 Indian Bengali psychological crime thriller Bengali web series directed by Aditi Roy. Written by Samragnee Bandyopadhyay along with Ayan Chakraborti, the series has been produced by Mahendra Soni and Aditi Roy under the banner of Soma Pictures Production. The series stars Subhashree Ganguly in the lead role while Saheb Chatterjee, Swagata Mukherjee, Arijita Mukhopadhyay and Aritra Dutta Banik play other pivotal roles.

Nabarun Bose has composed the music and background score for the series. Ramyadeep Saha did the cinematography while Subhajit Singha handled the editing. The series is about an investigative journalist who goes undercover in a women's prison to expose a sinister conspiracy involving mysterious pregnancies and corruption, only to be framed for murder and forced to fight for her survival. The series was streamed on 7 November 2025, on the Bengali OTT platform Hoichoi.

== Overview ==
Anusandhan is centralized on Anumita Sen, an investigative journalist who is known for her honest reporting without succumbing to political pressure. The narrative unfolds across two timelines. The present timeline shows a pregnant and physically weakened Anumita, serving her court sentence at the Rooppur Women's Correctional Home. There she is caught in a violent feud between two rival inmate factions led by Ammi Jaan and Bilkis Begum. Additionally, she also faces the wrath and inhuman torture of the corrupt jailer, Victor Pakrashi.

Through flashbacks, it is revealed that Anumita was sent to the home to interview an influential politician Narayan Sanyal. During her visit, she chanced upon a sinister conspiracy which included the forced abortion of a pregnant inmate. Despite subtle threats from Sanyal, Anumita and her assistant Bhombol begin an unofficial probe to discover the prison's internal rot. The situation escalates when her fiancé, Arnab uncovers an incriminating video evidence. But it is followed by a suspicious accident that leaves him in a coma and Anumita framed for a crime she didn't commit. The series further follows Anumita’s journey to survive the harsh prison environment while attempting to expose the nexus of political and administrative corruption.

== Cast ==
- Subhashree Ganguly as Anumita Sen, an investigative journalist turned inmate at Rooppur Women’s Correctional Home
- Saheb Chatterjee as Narayan Sanyal, an influential political leader
- Swagata Mukherjee as Bilkis Begum, an inmate leader
- Sohini Sengupta as Mili Mitra, a journalist in the same office as Anumita
- Arijita Mukhopadhyay as Ammi Jaan, an inmate leader
- Aritra Dutta Banik Bhombol, Anumita’s assistant
- Honey Bafna as Arnab, Anumita's fiancé
- Sagnik Chatterjee as Victor Pakrashi, jail superintendent

== Episodes ==
No.	Title	Directed by	Written by	Original release date
1	"The World of Insanity"	Aditi Roy	Samragnee Bandyopadhyay	November 7, 2025
2	"New truth"	Aditi Roy	Samragnee Bandyopadhyay	November 7, 2025
3	"Threat"	Aditi Roy	Samragnee Bandyopadhyay	November 7, 2025
4	"Trapped"	Aditi Roy	Samragnee Bandyopadhyay	November 7, 2025
5	"Same Shade"	Aditi Roy	Samragnee Bandyopadhyay	November 7, 2025
6	"Clue"	Aditi Roy	Samragnee Bandyopadhyay	November 7, 2025
7	"Endgame"	Aditi Roy	Samragnee Bandyopadhyay	November 7, 2025

== Production ==
"I did not try to copy or follow any real-life journalist. In fact, for any of the characters that I play, I never try to emulate anyone but give the character its own new face. As an actor, remaining on the same page with the director is of utmost importance. The director’s vision and route map for the character became my guide in further embellishing the role with nuances. So rereading the script and sitting with the maker multiple times are important exercises that I follow strictly."

— Subhashree Ganguly, regarding her experience about how she prepared for the series

Anusandhan was announced by Hoichoi as a part of its 2025 festive season releases, titled as "#UtshoberNotunGolpo", on 12 September 2025. It marked Subhasree Gangluy's second collaboration with Hoichoi after Indubala Bhaater Hotel (2023). On 10 October 2025, Subhasree joined Shaan during his "Infinity Tour 2025" concert in Kolkata, during which the date-announcement poster of Anusandhan was launched. The series was separately announced with an announcement video teaser on 17 October 2025. The first character poster of Subhasree from the series was also released along with it.

== Reception ==
=== Critical reception ===
Agnivo Niyogi of The Telegraph reviewed the series and wrote "Anusandhan has a solid premise— an investigative journalist pursuing a story inside a correctional home — and the performances pack enough punch to pull viewers in. But the execution doesn’t always live up to the promise." He appreciated the thriller elements in the first half, Subhashree Ganguly's "terrific" performance, Swagata and Arijita's performances in their respective roles, Ramyadip Saha’s mute tonal cinematography and the subdued but effective sound design that maintains a sense of danger throughout the series but criticized the writing, aggregating a lot of content within each episode, rushed arcs, appearance of unnecessary characters, the convenient timing of major twists, weak logic in certain scenes and the hurried pace.

Poorna Banerjee of The Times of India rated the series 3/5 stars and opined "Told largely from Anumita’s perspective, the narrative unfolds across shifting timelines as she pieces together clues to reveal the dark reality beneath." She praised measured pace of the initial episodes, the tension and atmosphere maintained throughout the series, Ramyadip Saha’s damp and claustrophobic cinematography, the blue green colour palette used to represent decay of Rooppur's world, the portrayal of the villain, Subhasree Ganguly's "heartbreakingly convincing" performance, Shaheb's restrained acting, Sohini and Swagata's performance, background score and the strong direction but bemoaned the lack of enough backstory for most of the characters, the relentless heaviness in the prison sequences and the lack of emotional relief.

Parama Dasgupta of Aajkal reviewed the series and noted "Anusandhan depicts the web of conspiracy and corruption, where is the snake's hole and what the consequences can be if you dig into that snake's hole." She praised Aditi Roy's direction, Samragnee Bandyopadhyay's screenplay, Subhasree's magnetic performance, her non-commercial de-glam appearance, Shaheb's cold portrayal of a ruthless politician, Sagnik, Arijita and Swagata in their respective roles, Sohini's seasoned and expressive acting but bemoaned the hurried episodes, lack of details in certain parts, lack of backstory of certain characters, few illogical scenes, the easy availability of the clues and predictable twists.

Parambrata Chattopadhyay reviewed the series on behalf of t2Online and wrote "The show has dollops of drama — and ironically, that drama stems from the very sensibilities that Aditi Roy and Samragnee Bandyopadhyay have honed while creating some of hoichoi’s biggest hits." He praised the intent, the pace of the series, Subhasree's committed performance, Arijita and Swagata's supporting roles, aesthetic and gloomy cinematography and the merging of the protagonist's personal and professional arcs, and Shaheb's suave portrayal of his character but criticized the underwritten character for Aritra Dutta Banik, weak performance by the peripheral cast, city-bred voices which disrupt the authenticity of its world, reliance on background music, the lack of casual brutality, the occasionally faltering non-linear screenplay which leads to confusion and the stereotypical and too literal dialogues.
