= Jogajog (novel) =

Novel by Rabindranath Tagore

Jogajog or Yogayog is a novel by Rabindranath Tagore. It was published in book form in 1929 (Asharh 1336). It was first serialised in the magazine Bichitra from Ashwin 1334 to Choitro 1335. In the first two issues the novel was titled Tin Purush. In the third issue in Ogrohayon 1334, Rabindranath changed the name to Jogajog.

The story revolves around the underlying rivalry between two families — the Chatterjees, aristocrats now on the decline (Biprodas) and the Ghosals (Madhusudan), representing new money and arrogance. Kumudini, Biprodas' sister, is caught between the two as she is married off to Madhusudan. She was brought up in a sheltered home where she had followed the traditional way of life and observed all the religious rituals like all the other womenfolk in the family. Her mental image of the husband is as someone who embodies all the qualities of the God she worships. Now, she is rudely shaken by the crude display of wealth and power by Madhusudan. Even if brought up to be a good, submissive wife, she balks at the idea of sharing the conjugal bed. "Madhusudan repeatedly used (this) money-worshipping strain to sneer at Kumu's family. His natural vulgarity, the coarseness of his speech, his arrogant discourtesy, the uncouthness of his body and mind that so deeply characterised his life: all this was something from which Kumu's whole being shrank every moment." Over time Kumu retreated to her nutshell of spirituality. But a time finally comes when Kumu cannot take it anymore and she returns to her brother's house, only to realise that she is pregnant. Eventually an unwilling Kumu is forced to return to the Ghoshals. The novel also highlights marital rape. Kumudini is subjected to marital rape by Madhusudan. There is also a sexual liaison between Madhusudan and Shyamasundari, the widow of Madhusudan's elder brother. Biprodas is a vociferous supporter of equal dignity and rights for women.

The novel was translated by Supriya Chaudhuri (Oxford University Press, 2006) as part of the Oxford Tagore Translations.

== Film adaptation ==
Jogajog was adapted into a 2015 film with the same name.
