= Magic Moments Motion Pictures =

Indian film production company

- Industry: Entertainment
- Founded: 2010
- Founder: Saibal Banerjee and Leena Gangopadhyay
- Headquarters: Kolkata, India
- Key people: Leena Gangopadhyay; Saibal Banerjee
- Products: Television shows, films
- Website: https://magicmomentsmotionpictures.com/

Magic Moments Motion Pictures is an Indian Bengali-language television serial and film production company based in Kolkata, incorporated on 29 June 2010. Magic Moments Motion Pictures Private Limited has 2 creative directors/key management personnel—Saibal Banerjee and Leena Gangopadhyay. They started off with shows like Binni Dhaner Khoi and Keya Patar Nouko and went on to produce more popular shows on Bengali Television, including Ishti Kutum, Jol Nupur, Choker Tara Tui, Ichche Nodee, Ei Chheleta Bhelbheleta, Kusum Dola, Andarmahal, Phagun Bou, Nokshi Kantha, Mayunpankhi, Sreemoyee, Mohor, Kora Pakhi, Khorkuto, Desher Maati, Dhulokona, Ekka Dokka and Hindi-language soap operas such as Jhanak, Durga – Atoot Prem Kahani, Iss Ishq Ka Rabb Rakha and Ishani.

After gifting multiple Bengali serials to audiences, the house has decided to launch Hindi shows for India. It was a long process for the house and it took them 3 years to reach in that stage.

The production house has produced the first Hindi show Kabhi Kabhie Ittefaq Sey, jointly with Cockcrow and Shaika Entertainment for StarPlus. In November 2023, The production house officially launched their first official Hindi show and independent venture Jhanak on StarPlus. Gangopadhyay initially planned to introduce Ishani in Jhanak after its 5-year leap as a parallel storyline. After receiving positive response, it was developed into a standalone spin-off by the same name.

== Former TV Shows ==
Production Year(s)	Title	Genre	First aired	Last aired	Language	Refs
2009–2013	Binni Dhaner Khoi		31 August 2009	16 March 2013	Bengali	
2011	Kajol Bhromora	Romance; Drama	September 2011	unavailable	Bengali	
2011–2013	Keya Patar Nouko		14 February 2011	26 October 2013	Bengali	
2011–2015	Ishti Kutum	Love Triangle; Family drama Comedy; Romance	24 October 2011	13 December 2015	Bengali	
2013–2015	Jol Nupur	Family drama Comedy; Romance	21 January 2013	5 December 2015	Bengali	
2013–2014	Hiyar Majhe		16 September 2013	14 December 2014	Bengali	
2014–2016	Choker Tara Tui		24 March 2014	24 July 2016	Bengali	
2015–2016	Kojagori	Family drama Romantic comedy	2 February 2015	13 February 2016	Bengali	
2015–2017	Ichche Nodee	Love Triangle; Romance drama Family	15 June 2015	28 May 2017	Bengali	
2015–2017	Punyi Pukur	Drama; Family; Romance	7 December 2015	28 May 2017	Bengali	
2016–2017	Ei Chheleta Bhelbheleta	Drama; Family; Romance	28 March 2016	23 July 2017	Bengali	
2016–2018	Kusum Dola	Love triangle Drama; Family	22 August 2016	2 September 2018	Bengali	
2017	Adhbhuture		31 July 2017	6 October 2017	Bengali	
2017–2018	Kundo Phuler Mala		29 May 2017	18 March 2018	Bengali	
2017–2018	Gachkouto	Drama; Romance	26 June 2017	11 November 2017	Bengali	
2017–2018	Sanyashi Raja	Period drama Family; Romance	11 September 2017	15 July 2018	Bengali	
2017–2018	Andarmahal	Family drama	5 June 2017	9 November 2018	Bengali	
2018–2019	Phagun Bou	Romance drama	19 March 2018	1 December 2019	Bengali	
2018–2019	Mayurpankhi	Romance drama	12 November 2018	22 September 2019	Bengali	
2018–2020	Nokshi Kantha	Social drama	12 November 2018	10 July 2020	Bengali	
2019–2021	Sreemoyee	Drama Struggle; Romance; Family	10 June 2019	19 December 2021	Bengali	
2019–2022	Mohor	Drama; Women empowerment Struggle; Romance	28 October 2019	3 April 2022	Bengali	
2020–2021	Kora Pakhi	Drama; Romance	13 January 2020	1 January 2021	Bengali	
2020–2022	Khorkuto	Drama; Family; Comedy; Romance	17 August 2020	21 August 2022	Bengali	
2021	Desher Maati	Drama; Family; Romance	4 January 2021	31 October 2021	Bengali	
2021–2022	Dhulokona	Drama Struggle; Family; Romance	19 July 2021	11 December 2022	Bengali	
2022	Kabhi Kabhie Ittefaq Sey	Drama Family	3 January 2022	20 August 2022	Hindi	
2022–2023	Guddi	Drama; Family; Romance; Love Triangle	28 February 2022	7 September 2023	Bengali	
2022–2023	Ekka Dokka	Drama; Romance	18 July 2022	24 September 2023	Bengali	
2023	Balijhor		6 February 2022	16 April 2023	Bengali	
2023–2024	Jol Thoi Thoi Bhalobasha		25 September 2023	16 June 2024	Bengali	
2023–2024	Badal Sesher Pakhi		13 November 2023	30 June 2024	Bengali	
2023–2026	Jhanak	Drama; Romance	Season 1 20 November 2023 Season 2 9 June 2025	Season 1 8 June 2025 Season 2 31 May 2026	Hindi	
2024–2025	Durga – Atoot Prem Kahani	Drama	16 September 2024	5 January 2025	Hindi	
2024–2025	Iss Ishq Ka...Rabb Rakha	Drama	16 September 2024	20 April 2025	Hindi	
2024–2025	Roshnai	Drama; Negativity	25 April 2024	28 July 2025	Bengali	
2025	Ishani	Drama	3 July 2025	28 October 2025	Hindi	
2025–2026	Chirosokha	Drama; Romance	27 January 2025	8 April 2026	Bengali	
2025–2026	Bholebaba Paar Karega	Drama; Family; Romance; Comedy	Season 1 15 September 2025 Season 2 18 February 2026 Season 3 4 April 2026	Season 1 17 February 2026 Season 2 1 April 2026 Season 3 12 April 2026	Bengali	
2026	Taara	Drama; Romance	10 March 2026	7 May 2026	Hindi	
2026	Sairaab	Drama; Romance	2 June 2026	22 September 2026	Hindi	

== Film productions ==
- Khoj (2017)
- Maati (2018)
- Khelaghar (2023)
