= Ranga Bou =

2022 Indian television series

- Genre: Family drama
- Created by: Crazy Ideas Media
- Written by: Sumitra; Anandarupa; Ayon; Ananya
- Directed by: Laxman Ghosh Rajat Paul
- Starring: Shruti Das; Gourab Roychowdhury
- Theme music composer: Abhiji Basu; Sobuj; Ashis
- Opening theme: "Ranga Bou Ranga Bou alta paye jaye"
- Country of origin: India
- Original language: Bengali
- No. of episodes: 314

Production
- Executive producers: Sromona Ghosh; Shreya Guha
- Producers: Sandip Agarwal; Rupa Banerjee
- Camera setup: Multi-camera
- Production company: Crazy Ideas Media

Original release
- Network: Zee Bangla
- Release: 19 December 2022 – 16 December 2023

Ranga Bou is an Indian Bengali language Drama television series that premiered on 19 December 2022 on Zee Bangla. The series is produced under the banner of Crazy Ideas Media. It stars Shruti Das and Gourab Roychowdhury in lead roles. The show ran for nearly a year and concluded on 16 December 2023 after airing approximately 314 episodes.

== Cast ==
=== Main ===
- Shruti Das as Pakhi Shil aka Ranga Bou: Kush's wife; Nabin's daughter; Rajani's stepdaughter
- Gourab Roy Chowdhury
  - Kush Shil : Pakhi's husband; Tapan's son; Lob's twin brother
  - Lob Shil aka Rocky : Malobika's husband, Niki's father, Kush's twin brother

=== Recurring ===
- Biswajit Chakraborty as Torunjyoti Shil aka Tarun : Ajit, Samar, Kiran, Simu & Moni's father Kush's uncle
- Manasi Sinha as Belarani Shil aka Bela : Ajit, Samar, Kiran, Simu & Moni's mother, Kush's aunt
- Phalguni Chatterjee as Tapanjyoti Shil : Kush & Rocky's father
- Manoj Ojha as Ajit Shil : Kush's eldest brother, Ani's father
- Nabonita Dey as Anupama Shil aka Boro bou/Anu: Ajit's wife, Ani's mother
- Swarnakamal Dutta as Indrani Shil aka Sona Bou/Indu : Samar's wife, Khushi's mother
- Suman Banerjee as Samarjit Shil aka Samar : Kush's elder cousin brother, Khushi's father
- Indrakshi Nag / Suchandra Banerjee as Chitralekha Shil aka Phool Bou/Lekha : Kiron's wife, Chuti's mother
- Hritojeet Chatterjee as Kironjit Shil aka Kiron : Kush's elder cousin brother, Chuti's father
- Srija Ghosh as Chuti: Kiron and Lekha's daughter
- Liza Sarkar as Khushi Shil : Samar and Indrani's daughter
- Pritam Das as Aniruddha Shil aka Ani : Ajit and Anupama's son
- Payel Deb as Simantini (née Shil) aka Khuku/Simu : Kush's younger cousin sister, Rajesh's wife
- Priyam Roy as Rajesh : Simantini's husband
- Esha Bhattacharya as Rajesh's mother and Simantini's mother in law
- Pranabhi Bose as Guriya : Rajesh's sister
- Ankita Majumdar as Kumu (née Shil) aka Moni : Kush's elder cousin sister, Sudarshan's wife
- Pinky Banerjee as Malati: Pakhi's aunt
- Raghubir as Pakhi's uncle
- Mridul Matilal Majumder as Late Nabin: Pakhi and Kusum's father; Rajani's husband
- Shraboni Banik as Rajani : Kusum's mother, Pakhi's stepmother; Nabin's widow
- Tanushree Saha as Kushum Shil: Pakhi's half sister, Ani's wife; Nabin and Rajani' daughter
- Ankita Biswas as Nupur: Pakhi's friend
- Alivia Sarkar as Malobika Shil (née Sen) aka Pinki : Niki's mother, Rocky's wife
- Pritha Bandyopadhyay as Malobika's mother
- Biplab Banerjee as Jayanta Sen : Malobika's father
- Olivia Malakar as Moumita: Kiran's friend

=== Guest appearance ===
- Manali Dey as Shimul Banerjee from Kar Kachhe Koi Moner Kotha
- Kheyali Mondal as Mili Singha from Mili
- Pallavi Sharma as Alokparna Dutta from Neem Phooler Madhu

== Reception ==
TRP ratings for 2022
Week	BARC viewership		Ref.
Week	TRP	Rank	Ref.
Week 51	6.9	9	
Week 52	6.1	9	

TRP ratings for 2023
Week	BARC viewership		Ref.
Week	TRP	Rank	Ref.
Week 1	6.7	9	
Week 2	6.7	6	
Week 3	6.9	6	
Week 4	6.9	7	
Week 5	6.8	7	
Week 6	6.9	7	
Week 7	7.6	5	
Week 8	5.4	6	
Week 9	7.2	6	
Week 10	6.7	5	
Week 11	6.5	6	
Week 12	6.6	7	
Week 13	6.2	4	
Week 14	6.3	6	
Week 15	6.2	6	
Week 16	6.0	5	
Week 17	6.1	5	
Week 18	6.1	6	
Week 19	6.1	4	
Week 20	5.5	5	
Week 21	5.6	5	
Week 22	5.6	7	
Week 23	5.6	6	
Week 24	5.9	6	
Week 25	6.2	6	
Week 26	6.7	5	
Week 27	6.6	5	
Week 28	6.7	4	
Week 29	7.3	4	
Week 30	7.9	4	
Week 31	7.7	4	
Week 32	8.0	3	
Week 33	7.2	4	
Week 34	7.5	4	
Week 35	7.4	4	
Week 36	7.5	5	
Week 37	6.8	5	
Week 38	7.1	6	
Week 39	7.0	6	
Week 40	6.5	6	
Week 41	6.4	6	
Week 42	6.0	6	
Week 43	5.3	7	
Week 44	6.3	6	
Week 45	6.2	7	
Week 46	5.5	7	
Week 47	5.9	8	
Week 48	5.9	12	
Week 49	5.7	10	
Week 50	6.1	9	
