= Trinayani =

Trinayani may refer to:

- Trinayani (Bengali TV series), 2019 television series in Bengali language.
- Trinayani (Telugu TV series), 2020 remake of the Bengali version.
