= Ekjon Jhumur =

2002 film by Gautam Sen

Ekjon Jhumur (একজন ঝুমুর )
- Directed by: Gautam Sen
- Written by: Gautam Sen
- Story by: Mohit Ray
- Produced by: Ranajit Sarkar
- Starring: Locket Chatterjee; Badshah Maitra; Biswajit Ray; Biswanath Basu; Kallol Dasgupta
- Cinematography: Pradip Chakrabarty
- Edited by: Narayan Biswas
- Release date: July 2002
- Country: India
- Language: Bengali

Ekjon Jhumur (Bengali: একজন ঝুমুর) (2002) is a Bengali short film made for Calcutta Doordarshan and shown in prime time television channels in July 2002. Directed by Gautam Sen, the movie featured Locket Chatterjee, Badshah Maitra, Biswajit Ray, Biswanath Basu, and Kallol Dasgupta. This movie is Gautam Sen’s directorial début.A DVD version of the film, later shown in different film festivals.

== Plot ==
Based on a short story by Mohit Ray, Ekjon Jhumur ( Jhumur, the girl) is the story of Jhumur,(Locket Chatterjee )a self-respectful, independent-minded young lady of today in her late twenties. Her consciousness of life, morality and her own entity are intermingled with theater. The undaunted spirit places her above the nitty-gritty of daily life. She seeks emancipation through her medium of self-expression - the theater.

Jhumur's family included her mother, younger brother Chhorda (Biswajit Ray), wife of her elder brother who are sympathetic with her sense of emancipation and also share with her joys and ambitions. Jhumur is professionally attached with a theater group named Nanarup. She also acts in another group in her locality in which Rajat (Badshah Maitra) is the director. Apart from her professional attachment, Jhumur's only refuge is her close proximity with Rajat, a theater director - already married and father of a daughter. From closeness to love or something beyond. Her love for life, theater, and Rajat become inseparable in such a way, she could not resist.. Rajat also seeks comfort in Jhumur's companion.

The patriarchal society seems not to be tolerant with her sense of emancipation. It tries to delimit her within the conventional notion of womanhood. The inhabitants of the locality detest Jhumur's affinity with Rajat. The elders in the vicinity like Bhattacherjee or Mallickbabu are jealous about her. The youngers including local ruffians - Jaga, Patla and Buro use to tease her and even try to demean her publicly. Everyone is eager to snatch her freedom, she enjoys by engaging herself with theatre. They want to shatter her relationship with Rajat and teach a lesson.

Incidentally, Rajat has to take the responsibility of directing a drama to be played in the annual function of the local club. Jhumur is in the role of a female lead. The local ruffians are also involved in collecting donations for the annual function, which Jhumur and Rajat detest. Everyone thinks - something has to be done. In the pretext of rehearsal, the ruffians took Jhumur to a wrong destination and raped her.

Jhumur falls prey to the crime of the rapists. But who are the culprits? Is it the ruffians who committed the crime or the patriarchal society, who is the abater? The film seeks the question. There remains only one woman's fight against conventional society. A fight - Jhumur's own. Her armour - her challenge - the theater.
