= Raktakarabi =

Raktakarabi or Roktokorobi may refer to:

- Raktakarabi (film), 2017 Indian Bengali-language film
- Raktakarabi (play), 1924 play by Rabindranath Tagore
- Roktokorobi (TV series), 2023 TV series
