= Satvya Mulichi Satavi Mulgi =

2022 Indian Marathi language TV series

- Genre: Drama
- Written by: Abhiram Ramdasi
- Directed by: Jayant Pawar
- Starring: See below
- Country of origin: India
- Original language: Marathi
- No. of episodes: 748

Production
- Producer: Vidyadhar Pathare
- Production location: Lonavala
- Running time: 22 minutes
- Production company: Iris Production

Original release
- Network: Zee Marathi
- Release: 12 September 2022 – 21 December 2024

Related
- Trinayani

Satvya Mulichi Satavi Mulgi (transl. Seventh Girl's Seventh Daughter) is an Indian Marathi language TV series which aired on Zee Marathi. It premiered from 12 September 2022 by replacing Devmanus 2. It starred Titeeksha Tawde, Aishwarya Narkar and Ajinkya Nanaware in lead roles.

It is directed by Jayant Pawar and produced by Vidyadhar Pathare under the banner of Iris Production. It is an official remake of Bengali TV series Trinayani. The show ended on 21 December 2024 completing 748 episodes.

== Plot ==
Netra foresees the future and warns people of impending dangers. However, her superpower proves to be a curse as she always gets blamed and hated for her inauspicious utterances.

== Cast ==
=== Main ===
- Titeeksha Tawde as Netra Kulkarni / Netra Adwait Rajadhyaksh
- Ajinkya Nanaware as Adwait Shekhar Rajadhyaksh
- Aishwarya Narkar as Rupali Anil Mhatre / Rupali Shekhar Rajadhyaksh / Maithili Sengupta - Adwait's stepmother

=== Recurring ===
Netra's family

- Jayant Ghate as Bhalchandra Kulkarni (Bhalaba) - Netra's grandfather
  - Vinesh Ninnurkar as young Bhalaba
- Sakshi Paranjape as Mangala Kulkarni - Netra's mother
- Pranita Acharekar as Hema Kulkarni - Netra's sister
- Amruta Bane as Manorama Kulkarni - Indrani's mother; Bhalaba's sister

Adwait's family

- Veera Newale as Reema Adwait Rajadhyaksh - Netra & Adwait's daughter
- Aadhiki Kasbe as Isha Adwait Rajadhyaksh - Netra & Adwait's daughter
- Shweta Mehendale as Indrani Padmakar Rajadhyaksh - Padmakar's stepdaughter
- Rahul Mehendale as Shekhar Padmakar Rajadhyaksh - Adwait's father
- Mugdha Godbole-Ranade as Mamata Shekhar Rajadhyaksh - Adwait's mother
- Rajani Welankar as Padmaja Padmakar Rajadhyaksh - Adwait's grandmother
  - Janhavi Killekar as young Padmaja
- Vivek Joshi as Padmakar Rajadhyaksh - Adwait's grandfather
  - Chaitanya Chandratre as young Padmakar
- Abhijeet Kelkar as Kedar Padmakar Rajadhyaksh - Adwait's uncle
- Amruta Raorane as Ketaki Kedar Rajadhyaksh - Adwait's aunt
- Prashant Keni as Tejas Shekhar Rajadhyaksh - Adwait's step-brother
- Ekta Dangar as Falguni Tejas Rajadhyaksh - Tejas' wife
- Aniruddha Deodhar as Tanmay Shekhar Rajadhyaksh - Adwait's step-brother

Others

- Suruchi Adarkar as Astika Jathar - Snake catcher
- Aditi Sarangdhar as Trinayana Goddess
- Ajinkya Joshi as Adhokshaj (Banti) - Rupali's brother
- Rajan Tamhane as Mr. Diwadkar - Historian
- Kiran Rajput as Rekha Mahajan - Netra's friend
- Ashwini Mukadam as Lalita Mahajan - Rekha's mother
- Atul Mahajan as Prabhakar Ghaisas - Astrologer
- Sai Kalyankar as Meghana - Adwait's assistant

== Adaptations ==
Language	Title	Original release	Network(s)	Last aired	Notes
Bengali	Trinayani ত্রিনয়নী	4 March 2019	Zee Bangla	26 July 2020	Original
Odia	Dibyadrushti ଦିବ୍ୟାଡ୍ରଷ୍ଟି	6 January 2020	Zee Sarthak	16 July 2022	Remake
Telugu	Trinayani త్రినయని	2 March 2020	Zee Telugu	25 January 2025	Remake
Punjabi	Nayan – Jo Vekhe Unvekha ਨਯਨ – ਜੋ ਵੇਖੇ ਉਨਵੇਖਾ	3 January 2022	Zee Punjabi	23 March 2024	Remake
Tamil	Maari மாரி	4 July 2022	Zee Tamil	1 November 2025	Remake
Marathi	Satvya Mulichi Satavi Mulgi सातव्या मुलीची सातवी मुलगी	12 September 2022	Zee Marathi	21 December 2024	Remake
Malayalam	Parvathy പാർവതി	12 June 2023	Zee Keralam	30 September 2024	Remake

== Awards ==
Zee Marathi Utsav Natyancha Awards 2023
Category	Recipient	Role	Ref.
Best Supporting Male	Jayant Ghate	Bhalchandra Kulkarni (Aaba)	
Best Comedy Female	Ekta Dangar	Falguni Rajadhyaksha	
Best Friends	Titeeksha Tawde-Ekta Dangar	Netra-Falguni	

=== Special episode (1 hour) ===
- 9 October 2022
- 27 November 2022
- 11 December 2022
- 8 January 2023
- 12 February 2023
- 19 March 2023
- 16 April 2023
- 25 June 2023
- 30 July 2023
- 20 August 2023
- 26 November 2023
- 24 December 2023
- 21 January 2024
- 25 February 2024
- 10 March 2024
