= Barujjye Family =

2024 Bengali language web series

- Genre: Thriller, Crime
- Written by: Sanjay Bhattacharya, Santanu Chatterjee, Soumit Deb
- Screenplay by: Sanjay Bhattacharya
- Directed by: Sumalya Bhattacharya
- Starring: Rohit Mukherjee, Sudipa Basu, Dipanjan Bhattacharya, Rituparna Sen, Shweta Tiwari, Preksha Saha, Swarna Shekar, Amrita Debnath, Rana Basu Thakur
- Music by: Pranjal Das
- Country of origin: India
- Original language: Bengali
- No. of seasons: 1
- No. of episodes: 34

Production
- Producer: Santanu Chatterjee
- Cinematography: Subrata Mallick
- Production companies: Films and Frames

Original release
- Release: November 15, 2024

Barujjye Family is a 2024 Indian Bengali language Comedy and family web series directed by Sumalya Bhattacharya and it is written by Sanjay Bhattacharya, Santanu Chatterjee, and Soumit Deb. Santanu Chatterjee is the producer of the series.

The series starring Rohit Mukherjee, Sudipa Basu, Dipanjan Bhattacharya, Rituparna Sen, Shweta Tiwari, Preksha Saha, Swarna Shekar, Amrita Debnath, and Rana Basu Thakur.

Subrata Mallick is the cinematographer of the series. It was released on 15 November 2024.

== Cast ==
- Sudipa Basu as Kalyani Banerjee
- Rohit Mukherjee as Bidhan Banerjee
- Rituparna Sen as Yoga Teacher
- Dipanjan Bhattacharya as Arun Banerjee
- Shweta Tiwari as Simran Kaur Banerjee
- Preksha Saha as Gurkiran Banerjee
- Swarna Shekar as Barun Banerjee (Barry)
- Amrita Debnath as Kadambari Tagore (Candy)
- Rana Basu Thakur
- Sanjay Biswas as Dr. O.K.Dhor
- Mousumi Bhattacharya as Lottery Inspector
- Sanjib Sarkar as Ayyarappa
- Vicky Nandy as Kakababu
- Montu Mallick as Pintu Mechanic
- Sabuj Bardhan as Montu

== Episodes ==
No.	Title	Directed by	Original release date
30	"BOGLAR DERBY"	Sumalya Bhattacharya	15 November 2024
Bidhan's childhood friend Bogola comes to stay with him. Both of them decide to play a football match against Arun and Barry. During this time small things from the house goes missing. Who will win the match?
31	"BARUJJYEDER JAMAISASTHI"	Sumalya Bhattacharya	15 November 2024
Kalyani's elder sister arrives with her son-in-law to celebrate Jamai Sasthi. She hands over a long list for the celebration. Bidhan is worried about the expenses. How will the Jamai Sasthi celebrations be for the Banerjee family?
32	"PREGNANCY KIT"	Sumalya Bhattacharya	15 November 2024
Kalyani's family mistakes Radha's pregnancy kit as Kalyani's kit and thinks she's pregnant. This leads to chaos and confusion. Everybody starts taking care of Kalyani. How will Banerjee family react on knowing the truth?
33	"MUSHROOM KELENKARI"	Sumalya Bhattacharya	15 November 2024
Barry started growing mushrooms at home. There is a lot of noise at home. Mushrooms have a special menu and chili mushrooms have been cooked. What will happen if you eat those mushrooms?
34	"BARRY BHOJPURIYA"	Sumalya Bhattacharya	15 November 2024
Barry is keen to act in Bhojpuri films and hires a language trainer and a dance teacher to groom him. They come to Barry’s house to train him. How will the Banerjee family react to Barry’s new obsession with Bhojpuri?
35	"CHIT-E CHOMOTKAR"	Sumalya Bhattacharya	15 November 2024
A charming "astrologer" from London stirs up the Banerjee household with secret chits promising wild rewards. As the family follows his absurd instructions, chaos erupts - leading to comic confusion, a spiritual scandal, and one unforgettable truth bomb!
36	"CHOWKIDAR NO-1"	Sumalya Bhattacharya	15 November 2024
The residents of the apartment where Banerjee family lives decide to hire a security guard for safety. They start interviewing people for the job. Will they get the right man for the job or mess up like always?
37	"BABA COOL"	Sumalya Bhattacharya	15 November 2024
Barry invites social media sensation Baba Cool to his house. What kind of chaos and confusion will Baba Cool's arrival in the Banerjee house lead to?
38	"SUKH O SHANTI"	Sumalya Bhattacharya	15 November 2024
Sukh and Shanti are hired as house-helps by the Banerjee family. Sukh stammers and mispronounces words while Shanti is short of hearing. What new adventure will these new characters bring in the Banerjee house?
