= Maari (TV series) =

2022 Indian Tamil language TV series

- Genre: Supernatural; Conspiracy; Drama
- Based on: Trinayani
- Written by: Dialogues: Dharmalingam
- Screenplay by: Sargunam Pungaraj; Muthuraja; APG Madhu
- Directed by: Rathinam Vasudevan
- Starring: Ashika Padukone; Adarsh HS; Nakshatra Srinivas; Sugesh Rajendran
- Country of origin: India
- Original language: Tamil
- No. of seasons: 2
- No. of episodes: 1068

Production
- Executive producer: K Krishna Kumar (Zee Tamil)
- Producer: Shruthi Narayanan; Vinodha Narayanan
- Editors: S. Arul, Perumal
- Camera setup: Multi-camera
- Running time: 22 minutes
- Production company: Shruthi Studios

Original release
- Network: Zee Tamil
- Release: 4 July 2022 – 1 November 2025

Maari is a 2022 Indian-Tamil language Supernatural television series. The first season of the series starred Ashika Padukone and Adarsh HS. The main plot of the series was taken from Bengali language Zee Bangla's series Trinayani.

The second season of the series follows the 5-year leap and continuation of first season and it stars Nakshatra Srinivas, Sugesh Rajendran, Baby Anjali in the leads. The story revolves around a girl named Maari, who can foresee the future. It premiered on Zee Tamil from 4 July 2022 and ended with 1068 episodes from 1 November 2025.

== Series overview ==
Series	Episodes	Originally released	
Series	Episodes	First released	Last released
1	825	4 July 2022	27 January 2025
2	243	28 January 2025	1 November 2025

== Plot ==
Season 1

The story revolves around Maari, a simple small town girl. She can not only see and interact with ghosts, but can also see the future and foresee impending dangers. Surya's dead mother went to see Maari as a soul and requested her to protect Surya from dying. Maari is murdered by Thara from a personal grudge. Following this murder, the spirit of Maari travels to Yamaloka, where she comes upon the plight of Yama's daughter, putting her life on the line to save her. This act of Maari earns affection and respect of both Yama and his wife. Later it is discovered by Yama that Chitragupta had made mistake in Maari's life which ultimately led to her untimely death. To resolve this mistake, he gives Maari's spirit the chance to return to her body to live this second chance. But when Yama and Maari's spirit started to go to Maari's body, it was found out that her husband, Surya, had already burned it. To make things right, Yama offers Maari a chance to possess any one out of the three women named Jennifer, Durga and Gayatri. Then Yama and his wife find the fortune of all the three women and finds out that Durga's body is the apt one because as per Durga's fortune, she is courageous and bold police constable, who exposes a corrupt politician named Rathnavelu, who had illegally embezzled money and killed his own daughter-in-law. This act of bravery leads to a personal grudge from Rathnavelu, who, in a fit of rage, murders Durga.

Season 2

Upon Durga's brutal death, Yama instructs the spirit of Maari to enter and take control of Durga's body and Maari does the same. After possession, Durga is to be the bearer of Maari's spirit; however, Maari, who inhabits Durga's form, for a while cannot recall her former existence. Yama gives Maari to understand that the memories will only come back once she has linked up with her husband and daughter from another life. How Durga possessed by Maari reunites with her husband and daughter and save them from the impending dangers forms the crux of the story.

== Cast ==
=== Season 1 ===
Main

- Ashika Padukone as Maari - A girl from a poor family background. She can see and interact with ghosts, as well as see the future. Surya's wife; Deviani’s foster daughter; Sreeja’s foster sister, Parvathi's biological daughter (2022-2025)
- Adarsh HS as Surya - A rich entrepreneur. Maari's husband; Thara's stepson; Devi and Jagadeesh's son (2022-2025)

Recurring

- Sona Heiden (Jul.2022 - Apr.2023) → Sadhana (May.2023 - Jan.2025) as Thara / Maya
  - Main Antagonist: Jagadeesh's second wife; Surya's stepmother; Aravind, Dinesh and Priya's mother
- Shiva Subramanian as Jagadeesh
  - Devi and Thara's husband; Surya, Aravind, Dinesh and Priya's father
- Mukesh Kanna (Jul.2022 – Apr.2023) → Navin Charles (Oct.2023 - Dec.2023) → Navin Kishore (Feb.2024 - April.2024) as Aravind
  - Antagonist: Thara's first son; Jagadeesh's second son; Hasini's husband
- Tharun Appasamy as Dinesh
  - Thara's second son; Jagadeesh's third son; Sreeja's husband
- Shabnam as Hasini
  - Aravind's wife; Jagadeesh and Thara's daughter-in-law
- Anitha Venkat as Sujatha: Devi's sister
- Deepa Nethran as Parvathi
  - She lost her daughter and her eyes in an accident. Jagadeesh's sister; Maari's biological mother
- Abitha as Deivanai
  - Maari's foster mother and Sreeja's mother
- Delhi Ganesh as Neelakandan
  - Maari and Sreeja's grandfather; Deivanai's father
- Sairabanu as Sreeja
  - Antagonist: Maari's foster sister and Dinesh's wife
- Dheepthi Kapil (Nov.2022 – Mar.2023) → Mounika (Mar.2023 - Dec.2023) as Jasmin: Murugan's wife; Maria's elder sister
- Ashwini Radhakrishna as Rasathi (A spirit)
- Arun Padmanaban as Murugan: Jasmin's husband
- Manohar Krishnan as Gangatharan
- Ganesh as Shankara Pandi
  - Antagonist: Thara's younger brother
- Unknown (Dec.2023 - Mar.2024) as Maria, Jasmin's younger sister

Special Appearances

- Meera Krishna as Devi
  - A Spirit. Surya's mother; Jagadeesh's first wife
- Sudha Chandran as Chamundeshwari
  - Jagadeesh's elder sister (2022 & 2024)
- Vanitha Vijayakumar as Shakunthala
  - Surya's relative (2022 & 2023)
- Pandiarajan as Rajan
  - Shakunthala's husband (2022)
- Krishnapriya K Nair as Meena
  - Maari's friend; Rajan and Shakunthala's daughter (2022 & 2024)
- Nimesh Sagar as Meena's husband (2022 & 2024)
- Devayani as Muthu Pechi (2023)
- Keerthana as Amman (2023)

=== Season 2 ===
Main

- Anjana Sreenivasan as Inspector Durga. M alias Maari - Surya's 2nd wife; A girl possessed by Maari's spirit (Jan 2025 - Nov 2025)
- Sugesh Rajendran as Surya - A rich entrepreneur. Maari's husband; Thara's stepson; Devi and Jagadeesh's son (Feb 2025 - Nov 2025) (Durga's husband)
- Safa as Devi - Maari and Surya's biological daughter; Durga’s step-daughter (Feb 2025 - Nov 2025)

Recurring

- Sadhana as Thara / Maya
  - Main Antagonist: Jagadeesh's second wife; Surya's stepmother; Aravind, Dinesh and Priya's mother
- Kavitha Solairaja as Saraswathi
  - Durga's step-mother
- Shabnam as Hasini
  - Aravind's wife; Jagadeesh and Thara's daughter-in-law
- Deepa Nethran as Parvathi
  - Jagadeesh's sister; Maari's biological mother
- Ganesh as Shankara Pandi
  - Antagonist: Thara's younger brother
- Bharathi Mohan as Rathnavelu (Antagonist)
- Surjith as Ramesh
- Indiran as Dewakar
  - Surya's P.A.

Special Appearances

- Ashika Padukone as Maari (2025)
- Abhishek Shankar as Yama (2025)
- Keerthana as Dhumorna (2025)
- Priyanka Nalkari as Jennifer, a lawyer (2025)
- Dharshana Ashokan as Gayatri, a doctor (2025)
- Sudha Chandran as Chamundeshwari, Jagadeesh's elder sister (2025)
- Senthilnathan as Astrologer (2025)
- Ashwanth Thilak as Vasanth (2025)

== Production ==
=== Casting ===
Actress Ashika Padukone was cast as Maari, She was reprising her role of Telugu version Trinayani serial, making her comeback to Tamil Television after Tamil Selvi nearly two years. Newcomer Actor Adarsh HS was cast as the male lead role as Surya. Abitha was cast as Maari and Sreeja's mother Deivanai, marking her return after Lakshmi Stores. On 4 July 2022, Vanitha Vijayakumar and Pandiarajan were cast as special Appearances. In September 2022, Sudha Chandran was cast as Chamundeshwari in Special Appearances.

Actress Sona Heiden was cast as main antagonist Thara, but was replaced by Sadhana in May 2023. In Same month, Mukesh Kanna quit the show saying, "never got a chance to showcase my performance and skills as an actor, I never got to work for more than 2-3 days a month".

In 2022, actress Dheepthi Kapil entered the show as Surya's new love interest. However, she also left resulting in Mounika Subramaniyam to play the role in March 2023. In May 2023, actress Devayani was cast as special Appearances. In July 2023, actor Arun Padmanaban joins the cast as Mrugan.

In January 2025, a five-year leap was introduced with which several new characters entered in the show and became pivotal characters. Anjana a.k.a. Nakshatra Srinivas, Sugesh Rajendran were introduced as leads of the five-year leap who play PC Durga IPS and Surya. In end of January, actor Surjith joins the cast as Ramesh.

=== Promotion ===
Zee Tamil was promoted their new three fictions Meenakshi Ponnunga, Amudhavum Annalakshmiyum and including this series by making advertisement with popular film actress Sneha, Sangeetha and Saranya Ponvannan with the slogan 'Vanga Paarkalaam Ithu Namma Time' (வாங்க பார்க்கலாம் இது நம்ம நேரம்) and this promo released on 26 June 2022.

== Awards ==
Award	Category	Recipient	Role
Zee Tamil Kudumbam Viruthugal 2022	Best Serial		
Zee Tamil Kudumbam Viruthugal 2022	Best Villi	Sona Heiden	Thara
Zee Tamil Kudumbam Viruthugal 2022	Best Supporting Actress	Shabnam	Hasini
Zee Tamil Kudumbam Viruthugal 2022	People's Choice Face of The Year	Ashika Padukone	Maari
Zee Tamil Kudumbam Viruthugal 2023	Best Actor Female	Ashika Padukone	Maari
Zee Tamil Kudumbam Viruthugal 2023	Best Comedian	Ganesh	Sankarapandi

== Adaptations ==
Language	Title	Original release	Network(s)	Last aired	Notes
Bengali	Trinayani ত্রিনয়নী	4 March 2019	Zee Bangla	26 July 2020	Original
Odia	Dibyadrushti ଦିବ୍ୟାଡ୍ରଷ୍ଟି	6 January 2020	Zee Sarthak	16 July 2022	Remake
Telugu	Trinayani త్రినయని	2 March 2020	Zee Telugu	25 January 2025	Remake
Punjabi	Nayan – Jo Vekhe Unvekha ਨਯਨ – ਜੋ ਵੇਖੇ ਉਨਵੇਖਾ	3 January 2022	Zee Punjabi	23 March 2024	Remake
Tamil	Maari மாரி	4 July 2022	Zee Tamil	1 November 2025	Remake
Marathi	Satvya Mulichi Satavi Mulgi सातव्या मुलीची सातवी मुलगी	12 September 2022	Zee Marathi	21 December 2024	Remake
Malayalam	Parvathy പാർവതി	12 June 2023	Zee Keralam	30 September 2024	Remake
