= Nayan – Jo Vekhe Unvekha =

Indian Punjabi language TV series

- Genre: Drama; Supernatural
- Screenplay by: Kiran Bidkar, Nomhit Godbole
- Story by: Kuldeep Singh Chhibber
- Creative director: Ramneek Kahlon
- Country of origin: India
- Original language: Punjabi
- No. of episodes: 643

Production
- Producers: Shashi Mittal; Sumit Mittal
- Editor: Lal Sahib Yadav
- Camera setup: Multi-camera
- Running time: 22 minutes
- Production company: Shashi Sumeet Productions

Original release
- Network: Zee Punjabi
- Release: 3 January 2022 – 23 March 2024

Related
- Trinayani

Nayan – Jo Vekhe Unvekha (transl. Nayan – What She Sees) is a 2022 Indian Punjabi TV series that premiered from 3 January 2022 on Zee Punjabi. It is produced under the banner of Shashi Sumeet Productions and stars Ankita Saili and Manjeet Makkar. It is an official remake of Bengali TV series Trinayani.

== Summary ==
Nayan, a simple small town girl, experiences the boon and bane of her power of premonition. She goes on to marry Devansh under unusual circumstances and turns out to be his saviour. Rita, Devansh's stepmother, plans to kill Devansh in order to get his property. Rita is helped by his brother Pompy in all of her plans. As time goes by, Devansh develops feelings for Nayan but he continues to treat Nayan bad in order to please his stepmother: who sees Nayan as a threat to her plans in wanting to kill Devansh. Rita decides to get Devansh another wife in order for Rajvir, Devansh's father, to transfer all of Devansh's property to the second wife. Rita chooses Jasmine, their lawyer's daughter, to marry Devansh in order for her to transfer all of his property to Jasmine. Jasmine gets pregnant with someone else's child and claims that Devansh is the father. Rita plans to kill Jasmine as she can jeopardize her plan.

=== Reception ===
Week	Year	BARC Viewership		Ref.
Week	Year	TVR	Rank	Ref.
Week 1	2022	2.3	1	

== Cast ==
=== Main ===
- Ankita Saili as Nayan, a kind girl who has the power of premonition; Neelam's sister and Madhvi's daughter; Devansh’s wife
- Manjeet Makkar as Devansh: Nayan's husband; Rita’s stepson and Rajvir's son

=== Recurring ===
- Rajinder Rozy as Rita: Devansh's stepmother; Pompy's sister; Rajvir's wife
- Yash Gulati as Rajvir: Devansh's father and Nayan's father-in-law; Rita’s husband
- Preet as Mamta: Devansh's biological mother
- Chanda Gartola as Neelam: Nayan's sister and Madhvi's daughter
- Jagjeet Kaur as Shagun aka Shanno
- Ganesh Kapoor as Pompy: Rita's brother
- Mohan Kambo as Girdhari Lal
- Harpreet as Madhvi: Nayan and Neelam's mother
- Majhail as Nakul: Rita's son and Kitty's husband
- Aashok Kalra
- Sourav Jain as ward boy

== Adaptations ==
Language	Title	Original release	Network(s)	Last aired	Notes
Bengali	Trinayani ত্রিনয়নী	4 March 2019	Zee Bangla	26 July 2020	Original
Odia	Dibyadrushti ଦିବ୍ୟାଡ୍ରଷ୍ଟି	6 January 2020	Zee Sarthak	16 July 2022	Remake
Telugu	Trinayani త్రినయని	2 March 2020	Zee Telugu	25 January 2025	Remake
Punjabi	Nayan – Jo Vekhe Unvekha ਨਯਨ – ਜੋ ਵੇਖੇ ਉਨਵੇਖਾ	3 January 2022	Zee Punjabi	23 March 2024	Remake
Tamil	Maari மாரி	4 July 2022	Zee Tamil	1 November 2025	Remake
Marathi	Satvya Mulichi Satavi Mulgi सातव्या मुलीची सातवी मुलगी	12 September 2022	Zee Marathi	21 December 2024	Remake
Malayalam	Parvathy പാർവതി	12 June 2023	Zee Keralam	30 September 2024	Remake
