= Anindita Raychaudhury =

Indian Bengali actress

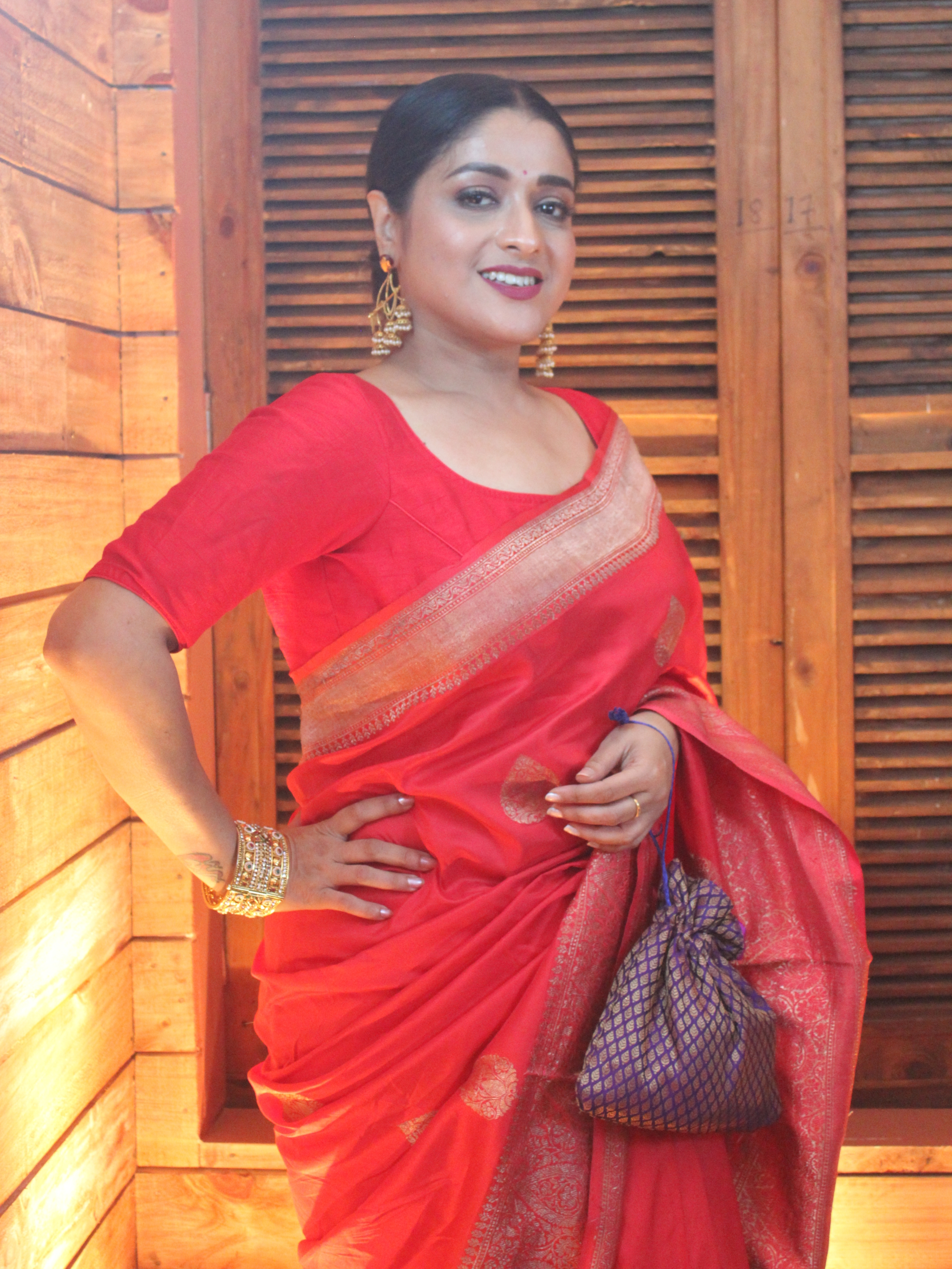
- Anindita Raychaudhury in 2021
- Born: Kolkata
- Occupation: Actor
- Years active: 2015 – present
- Notable work: Potol Kumar Gaanwala; Bhutu
- Spouse: Sudip Sarkar (m. 2022)

Anindita Raychaudhury (Born 28 Feb 1987) is an Indian actress who works in Bengali-language TV shows and films. She is known for her role as Subhaga in the soap opera Potol Kumar Gaanwala, which was aired on Star Jalsha, a Bengali-language cable television channel in India. She has also appeared in the television serial Bhutu.

== Personal life ==
On 26 January 2022, she married Sudip Sarkar.

== Filmography ==
- All film are in Bengali-language, unless otherwise mentioned.

Year	Film	Role	Director	Notes	Ref.
2018	Crisscross	Boudi	Birsa Dasgupta	Marked her film debut	
2022	Bishmillah	Maya	Indraadip Dasgupta		

== Web series ==
Year	Series	Role	Platform	Notes	Ref.
2021	Nokol Heere	Dipanwita	Hoichoi	Marked her OTT debut	

== TV shows ==
Year	Title	Role	Notes	Language	Channel
2015–2016	Potol Kumar Gaanwala	Subhaga Mallick, Sujon Kumar's first wife, Potol's mother	Supporting role	Bengali	Star Jalsha
2016–2017	Naagleela	Putalwali	Episodic role	Bengali	Colors Bangla
2016	Bhootu	Madhobi / Madhu	Supporting role	Bengali	Zee Bangla
2016	Goyenda Ginni	Madhuri Sanyal	Episodic role	Bengali	Zee Bangla
2017	Tobuo Mone Rekho	Jinia	Negative role	Bengali	Zee Bangla
2019–2020	Ke Apon Ke Por	Moyuri Dasgupta, Param's elder sister	Supporting role	Bengali	Star Jalsha
2019–2020	Chirodini Ami Je Tomar	Bidisha	Supporting role	Bengali	Colors Bangla
2020	Karunamoyee Rani Rashmoni	Champabhai	Supporting role	Bengali	Zee Bangla
2020–2021	Beder Meye Jyotsna	Jyotsna	Lead role	Bengali	Sun Bangla
2020	Kadambini	Subala	Negative role	Bengali	Zee Bangla
2020	Prothoma Kadambini	Baul	Episodic Role	Bengali	Star Jalsha
2021	Desher Maati	Rupali Bose, Noa's Mother	Supporting role	Bengali	Star Jalsha
2021–2022	Dhulokona	Chandreyi Ganguly, Chorui's mother	Negative role	Bengali	Star Jalsha
2022 – 2023	Guddi	Kaushalya Chatterjee, Guddi's ex mother-in-law	Negative role	Bengali	Star Jalsha
2022 – 2023	Ekka Dokka	Tamali Sengupta, Pokhraj's paternal aunt	Negative role	Bengali	Star Jalsha
2023 – 2024	Badal Shesher Pakhi	Damayanti	Negative role	Bengali	Sun Bangla
2024 – 2025	Neem Phooler Modhu	Nabanita, Barsha's ex mother-in-law	Negative role	Bengali	Zee Bangla
2024 – 2025	Tentulpata	Rishi's paternal aunt	Supporting Role	Bengali	Star Jalsha
2025 – 2026	Chirosokha	Barsha's mother	Supporting Role	Bengali	Star Jalsha
