= Bou Kotha Kao =

Bengali television series

- Genre: Drama; Comedy; Romance
- Created by: Ravi Ojha Productions
- Story by: Mitali Bhattacharya; Dialogues; Tathagata Mukherjee
- Directed by: Biswajit Ganguly
- Starring: Riju Biswas; Manali Dey Moumita Gupta
- Voices of: Title Track by Upaali Chatterjee
- Composer: Chandan Roy Chowdhury
- Country of origin: India
- Original language: Bengali
- No. of seasons: 1
- No. of episodes: 913

Production
- Producer: Ravi Ojha
- Production locations: Kolkata; Sikkim
- Production company: Ravi Ojha Productions

Original release
- Network: Star Jalsha
- Release: 5 January 2009 – 14 January 2012

Related
- Star Studio; Bodhu Kon Alo Laaglo Chokhe; Gustakh Dil

Bou Kotha Kao (Bengali: বউ কথা কও) is a television serial that aired on Bengali GEC Star Jalsha. It was produced by Ravi Ojha Productions and was directed by Tathagata Mukherjee. It starred Riju Biswas and Manali Dey in the lead roles, and Ridhima Ghosh (later replaced by Parno Mittra) as the 2nd Female Lead. It ended in January 2012. Later it was remade in Hindi as Gustakh Dil. It was re-aired on Star Jalsha during lockdown period, due to COVID-19. This Show is 3rd time repeat telecast on Star Jalsha on 9 May 2024. (Mon - Sun 12.00Pm to 1.00pm)

== Plot ==
Bou Kotha Kao is the story of a simple village girl Mouri and a guy from the city Nikhil. Nikhil is forcefully married to Mouri, but he is already in love with Neera and makes it very clear to Mouri that they will never share a husband–wife relationship. Nikhil's mother does not like Mouri anyway, and her sole agenda is to make life difficult for her. However, as days pass Nikhil starts falling in love with Mouri. But Nikhil's mother hates her and forces her to leave the house. Mouri puts up in a hostel and tutors Mili in order to earn a living. Mili's father Sagar Sen, a famous choreographer, helps Mouri to become a dancing sensation. Learning about her stardom, Nikhil's family welcomes Mouri back into their house and lives.

== Cast ==
=== Main ===
- Riju Biswas as Nikhil Chowdhury
- Manali Dey as Mayurakshi Chowdhury / Mouri
- Ridhima Ghosh / Parno Mitra as Neera

=== Recurring ===
- Samrat Mukherji as Sagar Sen
- June Malia as Sagar's late wife
- Ashok Bhattacharya as Kamalesh, Samaresh & Swarna's father, Nikhil's paternal grandfather, head of Palashdanga village
- Debjani Chatterjee as Swarna- Nikhil's paternal aunt
- Pijush Ganguly as Swarna's husband
- Pradip Chakraborty as doctor cum priest of Palashdanga village
- Anusuya Majumdar as Niharika- Neelima's mother, Nikhil's maternal grandmother
- Kunal Padhi as Ronojoy- Nikhil's maternal uncle
- Rita Dutta Chakraborty- Nikhil's maternal aunt
- Kunal Mitra / Palash Mukherjee / Bimal Chakraborty as Kamalesh- Nolini & Nikhil's father
- Moumita Gupta as Neelima- Nolini, Akash & Nikhil's mother
- Biplab Das Gupta as Neera's father
- Unknown as Neera's mother
- Disha Ganguly as Ranjana
- Badshah Moitra as Samaresh- Gunja and Rangan's father
- Rupa Rai Bhattacharya / Baisakhi Marjit as Samaresh's wife, Gunja and Rangan's mother
- Bidipta Chakraborty as Aparna - Samaresh's second wife, Gunja and Rangan's stepmother
- Anish Mukherjee as Rangan
- Komalnishad Mitra as Gunja
- Anindita Bose as Nalini
- Tathagata Mukherjee as Rudra
- Sourav Chatterjee as Sobuj- Nikhil's friend
- Ena Saha as Mahua- Mouri's younger sister
- Unknown as Sheuli- Mouri's youngest sister
- Subhadra Chakraborty as Bokul- Mouri's mother
- Milan Roy Choudhury as Girish- Mouri's father
- Rittwika Sen as Mili
- Sayak Chakraborty as Junior Artist
- Sohail Dutta as young Nikhil
- Unknown as young Akash (deceased)
- Ronnie Chakraborty as Nikhil's friend
- Vivaan Ghosh as Raktim

== Productions ==
The show was produced by Ravi Ojha Productions. The show became very popular and it generated high TRPs like 4.2. (which was very high in those times).In 2014, the soap was telecast once again on Jalsha Movies.

== Adaptations ==
Language	Title	Original release	Network(s)	Last aired	Notes
Bengali	Bou Kotha Kao বৰ কথা কও	5 January 2009	Star Jalsha	14 January 2012	Original
Marathi	Man Udhan Varyache मन उधाण वाऱ्याचे	27 July 2009	Star Pravah	1 October 2011	Remake
Hindi	Gustakh Dil गुस्ताख दिल	5 August 2013	Life OK	4 November 2014	Remake

== Awards ==
- Best Serial (Manthan Tele Cine Awards)

== External Website ==
- Website
