= Rita Dutta Chakraborty =

Bengali film and television actress

- Born: Rita Chakraborty; Balurghat, West Bengal, India
- Occupation: Actress

Rita Dutta Chakraborty (born 4 July 1956, Balurghat) is a Bengali film and television actress. She has acted in movies like Krantikaal, Alo. She played the role of Aarati in Star Jalsha's popular serial Maa. Rita is also a Bengali reciter.

== Filmography ==
Year	Film	Director	Character
1994 2002	Shilpi Mr.and Mrs iyer	Nabyendu Chatterjee Aparna sen	
2003	Alo	Tarun Majumder	
2003	Parampar		
2005	Krantikaal	Sekhar Das	
2009	Houseful	Bappaditya Bandopadhyay	
2014	Highway	Sudipto Chattopadhyay	

== Television ==
Year	Serial	Channel	Character
1999–2005	Ek Akasher Niche	Zee Bangla	Gulabi, Zeenat's mother
2005–2007	Ekdin Pratidin	Zee Bangla	Mohor's paternal aunt; Brata and Barsha's mother
2008–2010	Durga	Star Jalsha	Maya Maa
2009–2011	Sholo Aana	ETV Bangla	
2009–2011	Bou Kotha Kao	Star Jalsha	Nikhil's Aunt
2012–2013	Bhasha	Star Jalsha	Reshmi Lahiri
2011–2013	Keya Patar Nouko	Zee Bangla	Sona's Aunt
2009–2014	Maa....Tomay Chara Ghum Ashena	Star Jalsha	Aarati
2013–2014	Hiyar Majhe	ETV Bangla	Bhromor's step mother
2013–2014	Kache Aye Shoi	Zee Bangla	Moni Ma
2014–2015	Tumi Robe Nirobe	Zee Bangla	Leela (Later Replaced by Suchismita Chowdhury)
2013–2015	Jol Nupur	Star Jalsha	Nandini
2014–2015	Gouridaan	Colors Bangla	Mahamaya; Bishu's Grandmother
2015	Bojhena Se Bojhena	Star Jalsha	Bai Saa
2015–2016	Punyi Pukur	Star Jalsha	Basumati
2016–2017	Ei Chheleta Bhelbheleta	Zee Bangla	Shaluk's maternal Aunt
2016	Goyenda Ginni	Zee Bangla	Bijaya Sen
2016–2017	Ichche Nodee	Star Jalsha	Kurchi; Meghla's biological mother
2016–2018	Kusum Dola	Star Jalsha	Radharani; Rano's mother
2016–2017	Agnijal	Star Jalsha	Rajmata Bedantika; Devdaksha's mother
2017–2018	Andarmahal	Zee Bangla	Kamalini Bose
2017	Gachkouto	Colors Bangla	Ritu
2018	Amloki	Zee Bangla	Sudokkhina Guhathakurta
2018–2019	Mayurpankhi	Star Jalsha	"Mamoni" - Papan's aunt
2018	Karunamoyee Rani Rashmoni	Zee Bangla	Cameo role as "Kapalika" (a nun)
2019	Jai Kali Kalkattawali	Star Jalsha	Kamala's mother-in-law
2019	Aay Khuku Aay	Sun Bangla	Rani's mother-in-law
2019–2022	Mohor	Star Jalsha	Basumati Basu, Mohor's mother
2020–2021	Kora Pakhi	Star Jalsha	Mrinalini Sen / Gulu
2021	Desher Maati	Star Jalsha	Shubalaksmi / Bourani
2021–2022	Dhulokona	Star Jalsha	Supriya Chatterjee, Lalon's mother, Phuljhuri's mother-in-law
2022	Uron Tubri	Zee Bangla	Anjali Bose, Arjun's mother, Tubri's mother-in-law
2022	Amar Sona Chander Kona	Sun Bangla	Aparna/Kamalini, Somraj's mother (Later Replaced by Dola Chakraborty)
2023	Balijhor	Star Jalsha	Srot's mother
2023–2024	Kar Kachhe Koi Moner Kotha	Zee Bangla	Madhubala- Putul, Parag, & Palash's mother, Shimul's mother-in-law
2024–2025	Puber Moyna	Zee Bangla	Ranjabati- Roddur's mother, Moyna's mother-in-law
2025–2026	Bhole Baba Par Karega	Star Jalsha	Raipurna- Shakya's mother, Jheel's mother-in-law
2025–Present	Taare Dhori Dhori Mone Kori	Zee Bangla	Katayayni- Gora's mother, Roopmanjuri/Adwitiya's mother-in-law

== Awards ==
Year	Award	Category	Character	Film/TV show
2013	Star Jalsha Parivaar Awards 2013	Priyo Sashuri	Reshmi	Bhasha
2015	Zee Bangla Sonar Sansar 2015	Priyo Sashuri	Leela	Tumi Robe Nirobe'
2024	Zee Bangla Sonar Sansar 2024	Priyo Sashuri	Madhubala	Kar Kachhe Koi Moner Kotha

== See also ==
- Laboni Sarkar
- Churni Ganguly
