= Super Singer (Bengali TV series) =

Indian reality-based singing competition

- Genre: Reality television
- Directed by: Ranjit Roy and Sangit Tiwari
- Creative directors: Soumya Chowdhury and Shounak Chakraborty
- Presented by: Rooqma Ray (2019); Jisshu Sengupta (2020–present)
- Opening theme: "Super Singer"
- Country of origin: India
- Original language: Bengali
- No. of seasons: 4

Production
- Producer: Subhankar Chattopadhyay
- Camera setup: Multi-camera
- Running time: 90 minutes

Original release
- Network: Star Jalsha
- Release: 1 June 2019 – 21 May 2023

Related
- Super Singer

Super Singer is an Indian Bengali language reality-based singing competition. It has been airing on Star Jalsha since 2019. The show is designed as a talent hunt to discover the best voice of Bengal.

== Series overview ==
| No. | Season | Year | Host | Judges | Winner |
|---|---|---|---|---|---|
| 1 | Super Singer Junior | 2019 | Rooqma Ray | Kumar Sanu, Kaushiki Chakraborty, Jeet Gannguli | Pranjal Biswas |
| 1 | Super Singer Junior | 2019 | Rooqma Ray | Kumar Sanu, Kaushiki Chakraborty, Jeet Gannguli | Sharmishtha Debnath |
| 2 | Super Singer | 2020 | Jisshu Sengupta | Kumar Sanu, Kavita Krishnamurti, Jeet Gannguli | Sanchari Sengupta |
| 2 | Super Singer | 2020 | Jisshu Sengupta | Abhijeet Bhattacharya, Rupankar Bagchi, Lopamudra Mitra, Shaan | Sanchari Sengupta |
| 3 | Super Singer Season 3 | 2021–22 | Jisshu Sengupta | Kumar Sanu, Kaushiki Chakraborty, Sonu Nigam | Shuchismita Chakraborty |
| 4 | Super Singer Season 4 | 2023 | Jisshu Sengupta | Shaan, Monali Thakur, Rupam Islam | Subhadeep Das Chowdhury |

== History ==
=== Season 1 ===
The first season aired as Super Singer Junior, from 1 June 2019 to 15 September 2019. The show was hosted by Rooqma Ray, and the judges were Kumar Sanu, Kaushiki Chakraborty and Jeet Ganguly. The winners of the season were Pranjal Biswas from Karimpur, Nadia and Sharmishtha Debnath from Tollygunge, Kolkata.

=== Season 2 ===
The second season aired as Super Singer, from 12 January 2020 to 4 October 2020. The show was hosted by Jisshu Sengupta, and the judges were Kumar Sanu, Kavita Krishnamurti and Jeet Ganguly. After the COVID-19 lockdown, the judges were replaced by Abhijeet Bhattacharya, Rupankar Bagchi, Lopamudra Mitra and Shaan. The winner of the season was Sanchari Sengupta from Kasba, Kolkata.

=== Season 3 ===
The third season aired as Super Singer Season 3, from 28 August 2021 to 20 March 2022. The show was hosted by Jisshu Sengupta and the judges were Kumar Sanu, Kaushiki Chakraborty and Sonu Nigam. The winner of the season was Shuchismita Chakraborty from Midnapore, Paschim Medinipur.

=== Season 4 ===
The fourth season aired as Super Singer Season 4, from 7 January 2023 to 21 May 2023. The show was hosted by Jisshu Sengupta, and the judges were Shaan, Monali Thakur and Rupam Islam. The winner of the season was Subhadeep Das Chowdhury from Behala, Kolkata.
