= Shruti Das =

Indian actress

Shruti Das Samaddar
- Born: November 30; Katwa, Purba Bardhaman, West Bengal
- Occupations: Actress; Dancer; Singer
- Years active: 2019–present
- Known for: Trinayani; Desher Maati; Jowar Bhanta

Shruti Das is an Indian film and television actress. She is best known for the daily television soaps Trinayani, Desher Maati and Jowar Bhanta. Das made her debut with Trinayani, in the lead role. It was streamed on Zee Bangla. It was followed with Desher Maati streamed on Star Jalsha. She played the principal antagonist in Jowar Bhata, which was aired on Zee Bangla.

She made her film debut with the Shiboprosad – Nandita directorial Aamar Boss (2024). She made her web debut with Dainee (2025). She has been acclaimed by the audience for her portrayal as Goddess Kali in various shows.

== Television ==
=== Serials ===
Year	Serial	Character	Channel	Notes	Ref.
2019-2020	Trinayani	Trinayani Basu aka Nayan	Zee Bangla	Debut Lead Role	
2021	Desher Maati	Noa	Star Jalsha	Lead Role	
2022-2023	Ranga Bou	Pakhi	Zee Bangla	Lead Role	
2025–Present	Jowar Bhanta	Nisha Basu (née Mitra) aka Moharani (disguised as Bibha)	Zee Bangla	Lead Role (Gray shaded)	

=== Mahalaya ===
Year	Title	Role	Channel	Notes
2019	12 Maashe 12 Roope Debibaran	Devi Poushkali and Devi Ratanti Kali	Zee Bangla	
2022	Debi Doshomahabidya	Devi Kali	Colors Bangla	
2023	Nobopotrikaye Debibaran	Devi Kali	Zee Bangla	

== Filmography ==
=== Films ===
Year	Film	Character	Notes	Ref.
2024	Aamar Boss	Aditi Basu	Debut, Supporting Role	
2026	Bhanupriya Bhooter Hotel	Parama	Supporting Role	

=== Web Series ===
Year	Film	Character	Platform	Notes	Ref.
2025	Dainee	Moni	Hoichoi	Debut, Supporting Role	

== Awards ==
Year	Title	Category	Role	Show
2019	Zee Bangla Sonar Sansar	Priyo Notun Sodassya	Nayan	Trinayani
2020	Zee Bangla Sonar Sansar	Priyo Bou	Nayan	Trinayani
2021	Kolkata Glitz Awards	Woman of Substance	Nayan	Trinayani
2021	Star Jalsha Parivaar Awards	Priyo Meye	Noah	Desher Maati
2023	Telly Adda Awards 2023	Most Challenging Actress	Pakhi	Ranga Bou
2024	Telly Adda Awards 2024	Promising Actor	Pakhi	Ranga Bou
2024	Zee Bangla Sonar Sansar	Sonar Somporko	Pakhi	Ranga Bou
2025	Telly Adda Awards 2025	Chotopordar Chiro Rongin Mukh	Herself	
2025	Telly Academy Awards	Priyo Juti	Nisha-Uji	Jowar Bhata
2026	Zee Bangla Sonar Sansar	Priyo Bhinno Swader Choritro	Nisha	Jowar Bhata
2026	Telly Adda Awards 2026	Iconic Performer of the Year	Nisha	Jowar Bhata
