= Chirodini Ami Je Tomar =

2019 Indian TV series

- Title Poster
- Genre: Drama; Romance; Family
- Created by: Boyhood Productions
- Developed by: Sushanta Das
- Written by: Sayantani Bhattacharya; Rupa Banerjee
- Directed by: Pijush Ghosh
- Creative directors: Nafisa; Susmita
- Starring: Sharly Modak; Souvik Banerjee
- Voices of: Upali and Amit
- Theme music composer: Debjit Roy
- Opening theme: Chirodini Ami Je Tomar by Madhuraa Bhattacharya
- Country of origin: India
- Original language: Bengali
- No. of seasons: 1
- No. of episodes: 205

Production
- Producers: Susanta Das; Nispal Singh
- Production location: Kolkata
- Cinematography: Paritosh Singh
- Running time: 22 minutes (approx.)
- Production companies: Surinder Films; Boyhood Productions

Original release
- Network: Colors Bangla
- Release: 29 July 2019 – 22 March 2020

Chirodini Ami Je Tomar is an Indian Bengali television soap opera that premiered on 29 July 2019 and is broadcast on Colors Bangla and is also available on the digital platform Voot. The show starred model-actress Sharly Modak and Souvik Banerjee in lead roles and Suvajit Kar in a negative role.

== Cast ==
=== Main ===
- Sharly Modak as Anuradha Sanyal
- Souvik Banerjee as Ranodeep Basak
- Suvajit Kar as Abir (Main Antagonist)

=== Supporting ===
- Anindita Raychaudhury as Bidisha
- Dwaipayan Das/Vivaan Ghosh as Late Ali
- Surojit Banerjee as Rathindra Basak
- Tulika Basu as Mrinilani Basak
- Sanjib Sarkar as Rathikanta Sanyal
- Ranjini Chattopadhaya as Suroma Sanyal
- Sumana Chakraborty as Mrittika
- Nayna Banerjee as Keka
