= Trinayani (Telugu TV series) =

Indian Telugu language TV series

- Genre: Supernatural fiction Drama
- Based on: Trinayani
- Written by: Anjan Megoti
- Story by: Usha Rani K Anjan Megoti
- Directed by: Dinesh Painuri
- Starring: Ashika Padukone; Chandu B Gowda; Pavitra Jayaram
- Composer: Meenakshi Bhujang
- Country of origin: India
- Original language: Telugu
- No. of episodes: 1463

Production
- Producer: N Saibaba
- Cinematography: Santhosh Kotla
- Editor: Malleshwar Mailavarapu
- Camera setup: Multi-camera
- Running time: 22 minutes
- Production company: Annapurna Studios

Original release
- Network: Zee Telugu
- Release: 2 March 2020 – 25 January 2025

Trinayani is an Indian Telugu language supernatural fiction television series aired on Zee Telugu from 2 March 2020 to 25 January 2025. It stars Ashika Padukone, Chandu B Gowda and Pavitra Jayaram in lead roles. The main plot of the series was taken from Bengali language television series Trinayani, which aired on Zee Bangla between 4 March 2019 to 26 July 2020. Trinayani has emerged as one of the longest running television soap opera of Zee Telugu.

== Plot ==
The narrative of Trinayani centers around a woman from the Mukkantipuram hamlet. Nayani is the granddaughter of the pandit who oversees the local temple. The annual Radhotsavam honouring Goddess Visalakshi in their village is well-known. When Nayani was little, her father died. Her grandmother, mother Shayamla, and younger sister Sumana are her immediate family. She's had the ability to foresee the future since she was little. She doesn't remember the events in their exact order. They appear as a few visionary snatches of the event. She always has the ability to predict negative outcomes before they occur. The villagers do not view Nayani's gift in the same way even though she uses it to stop evil. Then she is forcefully married to Vishal in circumstances and more.

== Cast ==
=== Main ===
- Ashika Padukone as Trinayani aka Nayani: (2020–2025)
- Chandu B Gowda as Vishal: Nayani's husband; (2020–2025)
- Late Pavitra Jayaram (2020-2024) / Chaitra Hallikeri as Thilottama: (2024-2025)
- Inaya Anam as Gayatri: Nayani and Vishal's daughter (2022-2025)

=== Recurring ===
- Anusha as Sumana: Nayani's sister; Vikrant's wife (2024-2025) Formerly Sri Satya as Sumana (2020-2023)
- Vishnu Priya as Hasini: Vallabha's wife (2020-2025)
- Suresh Patel as Vallabha: Thilottama's elder son (2020-2025)
- Anil Chowdary as Vikranth: Thilottama's younger son (2020-2025)
- Bhavana Reddy as Durandhara: Jagadish’s sister (2020-2025)
- Niharika Harshu as Gayatri: Vishal's biological mother (2020-2024)
- Dwarakesh Naidu as Jagadeesh: Thilottama's husband (2020-2023)
- Chitti Prakash as Gangayya
- Meka Ramakrishna as Nayani's grandfather
- Raaga Madhuri as Shyamala: Nayani and Sumana's mother (2020-2022)
- Vijayalakshmi as Damaka

=== Special appearances ===
- Jayalalita as Lalitha Devi

== Production ==
Due to COVID-19 outbreak in India, Trinayani and all other television series and films shootings were suspended from 19 March 2020. Three months later, shooting was permitted and commenced from June 2020. The series commenced telecasting new episodes from 22 June 2020.

=== Title song ===
All tracks are written by Sagar Narayana

No.	Title	Lyrics	Music	Singer(s)	Length
1.	"Trinayani title song"	Sagar Narayana	Meenakshi Bhujang	N. C. Karunya	3:08
Total length:					3:08

=== Reception ===
Week	Year	BARC Viewership		Ref.
Week	Year	TRP	Rank	Ref.
Week 51	2020	7.0	4	
Week 52	2020	7.0	5	
Week 1	2021	6.8	5	
Week 2	2021	6.4	5	
Week 4	2021	7.4	5	
Week 5	2021	7.2	5	
Week 7	2021	6.8	5	
Week 19	2021	6.4	5	
Week 21	2021	6.8	5	
Week 22	2021	7.0	5	

== Adaptations ==
Language	Title	Original release	Network(s)	Last aired	Notes
Bengali	Trinayani ত্রিনয়নী	4 March 2019	Zee Bangla	26 July 2020	Original
Odia	Dibyadrushti ଦିବ୍ୟାଡ୍ରଷ୍ଟି	6 January 2020	Zee Sarthak	16 July 2022	Remake
Telugu	Trinayani త్రినయని	2 March 2020	Zee Telugu	25 January 2025	Remake
Punjabi	Nayan – Jo Vekhe Unvekha ਨਯਨ – ਜੋ ਵੇਖੇ ਉਨਵੇਖਾ	3 January 2022	Zee Punjabi	23 March 2024	Remake
Tamil	Maari மாரி	4 July 2022	Zee Tamil	1 November 2025	Remake
Marathi	Satvya Mulichi Satavi Mulgi सातव्या मुलीची सातवी मुलगी	12 September 2022	Zee Marathi	21 December 2024	Remake
Malayalam	Parvathy പാർവതി	12 June 2023	Zee Keralam	30 September 2024	Remake
