= Roopsagore Moner Manush =

Indian television series

- Genre: Drama
- Directed by: Shamik Bose
- Starring: See below
- Country of origin: India
- Original language: Bengali
- No. of episodes: 273

Production
- Producers: Mahendra Soni; Shrikant Mohta
- Production location: Kolkata
- Camera setup: Multi-camera
- Running time: 22 minutes
- Production company: SVF Productions

Original release
- Network: Sun Bangla
- Release: 3 July 2023 – 31 March 2024

Related
- Anandha Ragam

Roopsagore Moner Manush is an Indian Bengali language drama series starring Rooqma Ray and Debayan Bhattacharya in lead roles. It premiered on Sun Bangla from 3 July 2023 to 31 March 2024. It is loosely based on Sun TV series Anandha Ragam.

== Synopsis ==
Purna, a cheerful girl who believes in fulfilling her dreams, falls for a man with the opposite personality, leading to a series of comical events.

== Cast ==
=== Main ===
- Rooqma Ray as IPS Annapurna "Purna" Mukherjee Dutta Chowdhury: Shotinath and Mrs. Mukherjee's elder daughter; Gungun's sister; Ujaan's wife
- Shayan Mukherjee as Dr. Ujaan "Babai" Dutta Chowdhury: Anasuya's younger son; Shubho and Anjana's adopted son; Roop's brother; Ragini, Chitra and Titas's cousin; Purna's husband
- Debayan Bhattacharya as Abhirup "Roop" Dutta Chowdhury: Anasuya's elder son; Ujaan's brother; Ragini, Chitra and Titas's cousin; Ragini's widower

=== Recurring ===
- Anjana Basu as Anasuya Majumdar Dutta Chowdhury: Binoy's sister; Roop and Ujaan's mother
- Sneha Deb as Gungun Mukherjee: Journalist; Shotinath and Mrs. Mukherjee's younger daughter; Purna's sister
- Nabanita Malakar as Ragini Majumdar Dutta Chowdhury: Binoy and Shipra's daughter; Titas's half-sister; Roop and Ujaan's cousin; Roop's wife (Dead)
- Sayantani Mullick as Chhaya Majumdar: Binoy's wife; Titas's mother
- Sankar Chakraborty as Binoy Majumdar: Anasuya's brother; Shipra's ex-lover; Chhaya's husband; Ragini and Titas's father
- Animesh Bhaduri as Shubhadeep "Shubho" Dutta Chowdhury: Chandra's brother; Anjana's husband; Ujaan's adoptive father
- Sanghasri Sinha Mitra as Anjana Dutta Chowdhry: Shubho's wife; Ujaan's adoptive mother
- Smritika Majumdar as Chandra Dutta Chowdhury: Shubho's sister; Chitra's mother
- Unknown as Shipra: Binoy's ex-lover; Ragini's mother
- Liza Sarkar as Titas Majumdar: Binoy and Chhaya's daughter; Ragini's half-sister; Roop and Ujaan's cousin
- Ishika Ball as Chitra Dutta Chowdhury: Chandra's daughter; Roop and Ujaan's cousin
- Shovan Chakraborty as Poda: Roop's best friend
- Amritendu Kar as Kartik: Purna's friend
- Sayan Banerjee as Rajbeer: Purna and Gungun's cousin; Shotinath and Mrs. Mukherjee's nephew and murderer
- Biplab Bandyopadhyay as Inspector Shotinath Mukherjee: Mrs. Mukherjee's husband; Purna and Gungun's father (Dead)
- Pushpita Mukherjee as Mrs. Mukherjee: Shotinath's wife; Purna and Gungun's mother (Dead)
