= Desher Maati =

Indian Bengali television soap opera

- Genre: Drama; Romance; Family
- Screenplay by: Leena Gangopadhyay
- Story by: Leena Gangopadhyay
- Directed by: Saibal Banerjee; Sujit Payin
- Creative director: Leena Gangopadhyay
- Starring: Shruti Das; Dibyojyoti Dutta; Rukma Roy; Rahul Banerjee; Payel De; Tathagata Mukherjee
- Theme music composer: Debojyoti Mishra
- Opening theme: "Desher Maati" by Anweshaa
- Country of origin: India
- Original language: Bengali
- No. of seasons: 1
- No. of episodes: 297

Production
- Executive producers: Anondita; Poulami; Sajal Biswas; Krishnomohan Baghchi
- Producer: Saibal Banerjee
- Production location: Kolkata
- Cinematography: Siddhartha Mukherjee
- Editors: Samir & Soumen
- Camera setup: Multi-camera
- Running time: 22 minutes
- Production company: Magic Moments Motion Pictures

Original release
- Network: Star Jalsha
- Release: 4 January – 31 October 2021

Related
- Khukumoni Home Delivery

Desher Maati is an Indian Bengali drama television series that premiered on 4 January 2021 on Bengali General Entertainment Channel Star Jalsha, and is also available on the digital platform Disney+ Hotstar. It aired its last episode on 31 October 2021. The show is produced by Magic Moments Motion Pictures of Saibal Banerjee and Leena Gangopadhyay, and stars Shruti Das, Dibyojyoti Dutta, Rukma Roy, Rahul Banerjee, Tathagata Mukherjee and Payel De in lead roles whereas Rita Dutta Chakraborty, Bharat Kaul and Anindita Raychaudhury among others in prominent supporting roles.

== Plot ==
It is a family drama with a romantic element. Its central theme is about staying connected to one's roots and uplift family values. The story revolves around how Mukherjee family members who returns to Swarupnagar rediscover themselves.

== Cast ==
=== Main ===
- Shruti Das as Noa Bose Mukherjee – A teacher; Abin and Rupali's daughter; Kiyaan's wife
- Dibyojyoti Dutta as Dr. Dibyangshu "Kiyaan" Mukherjee – UK returned doctor; Antara and Abhimanyu's son; Bikram's adopted son; Dodo, Mampi, Neelpakhi and Dimpi's adopted cousin; Noa's husband
- Rukma Roy as Rai "Mampi" Mukherjee Banerjee – A PhD student; Chandu and Mousumi's daughter; Dodo's sister; Neelpakhi and Dimpi's cousin; Kiyaan's adopted cousin; Raja's wife
- Rahul Banerjee as Dr. Rajrup "Raja" Banerjee – Dodo's close friend; Mampi's husband
- Tathagata Mukherjee as Sourangshu "Dodo" Mukherjee – A journalist; Chandu and Mousumi's son; Mampi's brother; Neelpakhi and Dimpi's cousin; Kiyaan's adopted cousin; Ujjwaini's husband; Raja's close friend
- Payel De as Ujjwaini Mukherjee – A journalist; Dodo's wife

=== Recurring ===
- Ashok Bhattacharya as Amitra Shekhar Mukherjee – A retired teacher; Shramanjit, Bikram, Chandu and Ratno's father; Dodo, Mampi, Neelpakhi and Dimpi's grandfather; Kiyaan's adoptive grandfather
- Anashua Majumdar as Sharmila Mukherjee – Amitra Shekhar's wife; Shramanjit, Bikram, Chandu and Ratno's mother; Dodo, Mampi, Neelpakhi and Dimpi's grandmother; Kiyaan's adoptive grandmother
- Shankar Chakraborty as Shramanjit Mukherjee – A renowned and wealthy writer; Amitra Shekhar and Sharmila's eldest son; Bikram, Chandu and Ratno's brother; Bourani's estranged husband; Shrishti's husband; Neelpakhi's father
- Rita Dutta Chakraborty as Shubhalakshmi "Bourani" Mukherjee – A music teacher; Shramanjit's estranged wife; Neelpakhi's adoptive mother
- Bharat Kaul as Dr. Bikramjit "Bikram" Mukherjee – Amitra Shekhar and Sharmila's second son; Shramanjit, Chandu and Ratno's brother; Antara's husband; Kiyaan's adoptive father
- Suchismita Chowdhury as Antara Mukherjee – Abhimanyu's former love interest; Bikram's wife; Kiyaan's mother
- Diganta Bagchi as Chandrajit "Chandu" Mukherjee – A lawyer; Amitra Shekhar and Sharmila's third son; Mousumi's husband; Dodo and Mampi's father
- Anindita Saha Kapileswari as Mousumi Mukherjee – Chandu's wife; Dodo and Mampi's mother
- Animesh Bhaduri as Ratnajit "Ratno" Mukherjee – A college professor; Amitra Shekhar and Sharmila's youngest son; Shramanjit, Bikram and Chandu's brother; Kankana's husband; Dimpi's father
- Shampa Banerjee as Kankana Mukherjee – Ratno's wife; Dimpi's mother
- Sairity Banerjee as Neelpakhi Mukherjee – Shramanjit and Shrishti's daughter; Bourani's adopted daughter; Dodo, Mampi and Dimpi's cousin; Kiyaan's adopted cousin; Raja's one-sided lover
- Ashmee Ghosh as Tathoi "Dimpi" Mukherjee – Ratno and Kankana's daughter; Dodo, Mampi and Neelpakhi's cousin; Kiyaan's adopted cousin
- Bhaskar Banerjee as Abin Bose – A teacher; Rupali's husband; Noa's father
- Anindita Raychaudhury as Rupali Bose – Abin's wife; Noa's mother
- Ananya Das as Dr. Payel Sen – Kiyaan's ex-fiancee
- Debottam Majumder as Shibnath "Shibu" Das – A local goon of Swarupnagar
- Saswati Majumder as Noa's friend and Shubhalakshmi's student
- Monalisa Paul as Dr. Kripa Basu – Raja's former batchmate
- Prasun Bannerji as SP Abhimanyu Sen – Antara's former love interest; Kiyaan's father

== Reception ==
=== Ratings ===
Week	Year	BARC Viewership		Ref.
Week	Year	TRP	Rank	Ref.
Week 6	2021	4.8	3	
Week 7	2021	4.5	5	
Week 8	2021	4.8	2	
Week 11	2021	4.3	5	
Week 12	2021	4.2	5	
