= Cosmic Sex =

2013 film directed by Amitabh Chakraborty

- Directed by: Amitabh Chakraborty
- Written by: Amitabh Chakraborty; Liaquat Ali; Surojit Sen
- Produced by: Putul Mahmood
- Starring: See below
- Cinematography: Rafey Mehmood
- Edited by: Amitabh Chakraborty; Amit Debnath
- Release date: 2013 (Osian's Cinefan Festival of Asian and Arab Cinema)
- Running time: 97 minutes
- Country: India
- Language: Bengali

Cosmic Sex is a 2013 art-house independent Indian Bengali-language erotic thriller film written and directed by Amitabh Chakraborty and produced by Putul Mahmood. The film deals with the connection between sex and spirituality.

== Plot ==
Cosmic Sex is the story of a young man Kripa who is on the run from sex and violence one night in Kolkata when he meets a woman Sadhavi who strangely resembles his dead mother. She gives him shelter and teaches him to travel inwards through sex.

== Cast ==
- Rii Sen
- Ayushman Mitra
- Murari Mukherjee
- Rwik
- Papia Ghoshal
- Biplab Banerjee

== Release and recognition ==
Lead actress Rii Sen won the Best Actress award at the Osian's Cinefan Festival of Asian and Arab Cinema for her role in the film.

Cosmic Sex was the closing film of the Cine Central Film Festival Kolkata.
