= Ayushman Mitra =

Indian fashion designer

- Born: Kolkata, West Bengal, India
- Occupations: Fashion designer, Painter, Actor

Ayushman Mitra is an Indian fashion designer, painter, and actor from Kolkata. He is the owner of fashion label Bobo Calcutta and was a featured GenNext designer at Lakme Fashion Week Summer/Resort 2018.

== Early life ==
Mitra was born in Kolkata, West Bengal, India to a cosmopolitan family.

Mitra eventually graduated from St. Xavier's College, Kolkata. Around this time, Mitra started painting professionally and got into group and solo exhibitions.

== Career ==
Mitra worked on sets for music festivals like the Bacardi NH7 Weekender.

Mitra's Bobo Calcutta label pushing the envelope on topics some might find uneasy. Mitra also had a role in the film Cosmic Sex.
