= Badshah Moitra =

Indian Bengali actor

- Born: Murshidabad, West Bengal, India
- Citizenship: Indian
- Occupation: Actor
- Political party: Communist Party of India (Marxist)

Badshah Moitra (born 1 January 1970) (Bengali: বাদশা মৈত্র; also known as Badshah Maitra) is an Indian actor, who primarily works in Bengali TV soap operas and films.

== Career ==
Badshah started his career in Bengali theatre and stage. He made his debut in television though Janmabhumi telecasted on DD Bangla. Thereafter, he has performed in numerous roles both as supporting and lead actor in TV soap operas and movies. He is also a supporter of Communist Party of India (Marxist). Beside these, he is very active in social welfare work for the people.

== List of works ==
=== Filmography ===
- Dhrubor Aschorjo Jibon (2025)
- Gotro (2019)
- Mukherjee Dar Bou (2019)
- Bristi Tomake Dilam (2019)
- Bhobishyoter Bhoot (2019)
- Nirbhoya (2018)
- Kintu Galpo Noy (2018)
- Aaleya (2018)
- Khirki Theke Singhadwar (2017)
- Black Coffee (Bengali) (2017)
- Raater Rajani Gandha (2016)
- Room No. 103 (2015)
- Troyee (2015)
- Mayabazaar (Bengali) (2012)
- Byatikrami (2003)
- Ekjon Jhumur (2002)

== Television ==
Year	Title	Role	Channel	Language	Comments
2000 - 2005	Ek Akasher Niche	Bhaskar	Zee Bangla	Bengali	
2003-2006	Neel Seemana	Sports Teacher	Zee Bangla	Bengali	
2006 - 2008	Khela (TV series)	Anirudra	Zee Bangla	Bengali	
2009 - 2012	Bou Kotha Kao	Samaresh Chowdhury	Star Jalsha	Bengali	
2011	Roilo Pherar Nimontron	Subhojoy / Shubho	Star Jalsha	Bengali	
2011 - 2013	Tapur Tupur	Tapur's boss	Star Jalsha	Bengali	
2011 - 2015	Ishti Kutum	Dhritiman Mukherjee	Star Jalsha	Bengali	
2013 - 2015	Jol Nupur	Binayak Pattanayak	Star Jalsha	Bengali	
2014 - 2015	Byomkesh (TV series)	Dr. Bhujangadhar Das	ETV Bangla	Bengali	
2016 - 2018	Kusum Dola	Late Mrityunjoy Mukherjee aka Badshah	Star Jalsha	Bengali	
2017 - 2019	Seemarekha	Subhranghsu	Zee Bangla	Bengali	
2018 - 2019	Phagun Bou	Nilanjan Dutta	Star Jalsha	Bengali	
2018 - 2019	Ami Sirajer Begum	Mir Jafar	Star Jalsha	Bengali	
2019 - 2020	Khonar Bochon	Varaha	Colors Bangla	Bengali	
2020–2021	Khorkuto	Dr. Sukalyan Chatterjee	Star Jalsha	Bengali	
2021	Dhulokona	Bullet Ganguly	Star Jalsha	Bengali	
2022–2023	Ekka Dokka	Soumyadip Bose	Star Jalsha	Bengali	

=== Web series ===
- Sudakshinar Saree (2020) by ZEE5 Originals
