= Dhulokona =

Indian television series

- Genre: Family drama
- Created by: Magic Moments Motion Pictures
- Written by: Leena Gangopadhyay
- Directed by: Saibal Banerjee; Sujit Pyne
- Creative director: Leena Gangopadhyay
- Starring: Manali Dey; Indrasish Roy
- Theme music composer: Debojyoti Mishra
- Opening theme: Dhulokona by Anweshaa
- Country of origin: India
- Original language: Bengali
- No. of episodes: 505

Production
- Executive producers: Debolina Mukhopadhyay & Arabinda Dasgupta (Magic Moments Motion Pictures); Taniya, Supriyo & Shayak (Star Jalsha)
- Producer: Saibal Banerjee
- Cinematography: Pankaj Saha
- Editors: Sameer; Soumen
- Camera setup: Multi-camera
- Running time: 22 minutes
- Production company: Magic Moments Motion Pictures

Original release
- Network: Star Jalsha
- Release: 19 July 2021 – 11 December 2022

Related
- Bangla Medium

Dhulokona is an Indian Bengali language television series that premiered on Star Jalsha from 19 July 2021 and it is also available on digital platform Disney+ Hotstar. The show is produced under the banner of Magic Moments Motion Pictures.The show starred Manali Dey and Indrasish Roy in lead roles. After a journey of 1 and a half years, Dhulokona ended on 11 December 2022 to give space for Bangla Medium.

== Plot ==
Phuljhuri, the care-taker of the Ganguly family (who actually is the daughter of the Ganguly family) meets Lalon, the driver of the Ganguly's and a rapper, continuously fight but eventually fall in love with each other. Mini, Debraj and Anandi's mentally unstable daughter starts loving Lalon and Phuljhuri. Chorui becomes jealous and starts making Lalon her own. One day, in Chorui's college function, Chorui and her friends try to intoxicate Lalon, but fails. That night, Chorui returns home with Lalon in an intoxicated condition, and says him 'I Love You Lalon'. Chandreyi files a complaint and the police arrest Lalon and Phuljhuri frees him up. One day, Phuljhuri's parents plan to get Phuljhuri married with Manik, who is twice of Phuljhuri's age. On the day of Phuljhuri's ceremony, Phuljhuri leaves her ceremony to see Lalon as he had a bike accident. Due to this, Manik refuses to marry Phuljhuri and Bittu says that he will never bring her wife, Priya, who also happens to be Phuljhuri's younger sister. Lalon gets hospitalised and Mini and Debraj report to the Chatterjee's about Lalon's accident. That night, Subal, Arati and Pooja, her youngest sister, kick Phuljhuri out of the house as she breaks her marriage due to Lalon's accident which actually is a misunderstanding. Elsewhere, Phuljhuri cuts ties with her family. Chorui creates a drama of suicide and Chandreyi supported her. One day, Bittu offers a programme to Lalon and Lalon goes to sing there. Also, Manik stays there. While clicking selfies, a girl puts Lalon into trouble. The girl says that Lalon slapped the girl as she wanted to click a selfie with him. The members say that Lalon harassed that girl. Later, to save Lalon, Phuljhuri was forced to marry Manik.

Then Phuljhuri's family comes. During the wedding, Lalon breaks Phuljhuri's marriage with Manik before putting vermillion on Phuljhuri's forehead. Later, Phuljhuri's family realises that it was a misunderstanding between Lalon and Phuljhuri.

Taan and Kamalini get married, but Chorui gets jealous of Phuljhuri and Mini. On the day of Taan and Kamalini's reception, Lalon and Phuljhuri spend time alone. When Phuljhuri went to say the truth, Chorui slaps Phuljhuri in front of everyone. Chorui wants to forcefully marry Lalon, but the latter wants to marry Phuljhuri in a temple without informing anyone. One day, Anandi, Thammi, Kamalini and Boromamu make a secret pan for Phuljhuri and Lalon's marriage. Phuljhuri lies Chorui by saying she went to Subal and Arati's place. Dolly gets to know about it and reports it to her parents and to Chorui. Chorui stops Lalon and Phuljhuri's marriage and takes Lalon to the police station. Elsewhere, Phuljhuri decides not to ever talk with Lalon, leaving him annoyed. Lalon shows out his anger by insulting Phuljhuri and Chorui brainwashes him. To make Lalon Phuljhuri's, Anandi makes Phuljhuri practice a song. One day, Phuljhuri performs the song shocking Lalon, Chorui. Lalon starts coming closer to Phuljhuri and Phuljhuri is constantly criticised by Chandreyi and Chorui. One day, Subal and Arati come to the Ganguly residence and meet Phuljhuri for taking the money she earned by singing. Phuljhuri learns from Subal she was adopted by Arati and him when they brought up Phuljhuri from the street road and Phuljhuri imagines that who she actually is and gets to know that Priya and Pooja are the only daughters of Subal and Arati biologically. This makes Phuljhuri shattered and Arati emotional. Chorui and her friends plan to kick Phuljhuri out of the Ganguly residence by poisoning Mini. Phuljhuri and Mini go for an outing, where Mini eats a cotton candy and Modon accuses Mini for her mental sickness. Modon gives Phuljhuri a poison, and gives it gi Mini and Mini's stomach pains and her health deteriorates and she was hospitalised. The Ganguly's learn that Mini was poisoned. Anandi slaps Phuljhuri for it and the Ganguly's believe that she did it to break off Lalon and Chorui's ceremony. She confesses it. Lalon believes that Phuljhuri is not the culprit and tries to gather evidence and to prove that Phuljhuri is not the culprit. Lalon brings Modon and shows the footage and exposes Chorui. Modon gets arrested but Chorui is not taken into custody for some reason. Gablu slaps Chorui for her sins and Chorui plans another conspiracy against Phuljhuri. Phuljhuri drank cold water before her performance, but later, she was warned by Lalon because of the conspiracy. Chorui and her friends planned to drink Phuljhuri and Mrinmayee. Both of them come home in a drunken condition, and Lalon slaps Phuljhuri and says that he'll marry Chorui, in anger. Phuljhuri commits suicide, but gets saved by Lalon. On the day of the ceremony, police officers come and arrest Chorui for her sins and Lalon decides to marry Phuljhuri. One day, Phuljhuri goes to the temple for Lalon's recovery and puts vermillion on Lalon's name. Chorui plans to attack Phuljhuri by putting harmful colour on her eyes on the day of Holi. Slowly, her eyes regain her vision. After 20 – 21 years, Poroma meets Bullet and discusses about the situation when it was time for Poroma's delivery. Years back, Poroma gave birth to Phuljhuri, but as Poroma was unmarried, she regretted to carry Phuljhuri with her. One day, Bullet goes to the hospital where Poroma was admitted during her delivery. Bullet gets to know that one lady of the hospital used to stay in a slum where a wife was unable to give birth to a child and the wife used pray to God and went go to so many places and spent money, but the wife was humiliated by her husband for not giving birth to a child. Bullet gets thrilled to know that Phuljhuri is his daughter. Slowly Phuljhuri gains back her vision. She argues with Raghubir and then goes to Subal and Arati's place to invite them for her marriage. Poroma meets the Ganguly's after years and on the day of their marriage, Subal, Arati, Priya, Pooja and Bittu come. On the wedding day, Dolly secretly brings Chorui and forcefully Lalon marries Chorui, leaving the Ganguly's shocked.

The show ends on a happy note on Lalon and Phuljhuri returning to India from abroad after a year and their interview and ends where the whole family sings Aguner Poroshmoni of Rabindranath Tagore and a photo of Lalon and Phuljhuri reconciling after returning India.

== Cast ==
=== Main ===
- Manali Dey as Phuljhuri "Phuli" Das Chatterjee – Singer; Poroma and Bullet's daughter; Subal and Arati's adopted daughter; Priya and Pooja's adopted sister; Mini, Taan, Chorui and Kabul's cousin; Lalon's wife. (2021–2022)
- Indrasish Roy as Lalon Chatterjee– Singer and Ganguly family's former driver; Raghubir and Supriya's son; Dolly's brother; Titir and Chorui's ex-husband; Phuli's husband. (2021–2022)
- Shweta Mishra as Chorui Ganguly Talukdar (Former Antagonist) – An Odissi dancer; Chandreyi and Gablu's daughter; Taan's sister; Mini, Phuli and Kabul's cousin; Lalon's ex-wife; Rishi's wife. (2021–2022)

=== Recurring ===
- Sabitri Chatterjee as Ratulmoni Ganguly – Head of the Ganguly family; Halua, Gablu and Bullet's mother; Mini, Taan, Chorui, Phuli and Kabul's grandmother. (2021–2022)
- Ratna Ghoshal as Ruprekha Ganguly – Retired senior school teacher; Ratulmoni's sister-in-law; Halua, Gablu and Bullet's aunt; Mini, Taan, Chorui and Kabul's grandaunt. (2021)
- Shankar Chakraborty as Debraj "Halua" Ganguly – Ratulmoni's eldest son; Gablu and Bullet's brother; Anandi's husband; Mini's father. (2021–2022)
- Moyna Mukherji as Anandi Ganguly – Halua's wife; Mini's mother. (2021–2022)
- Bhaskar Banerjee as Somraj "Gablu" Ganguly – Ratulmoni's second son; Halua and Bullet's brother; Chandreyi's husband; Taan and Chorui's father. (2021–2022)
- Anindita Raychaudhury as Chandreyi Ganguly (Antagonist) – A school teacher; Gablu's wife; Taan and Chorui's mother. (2021–2022)
- Badshah Moitra as Meghraj "Bullet" Ganguly – Ratulmoni's youngest son; Poroma's estranged husband; Phuli's father. (2021–2022)
- Shampa Banerjee as Poroma Dasgupta Ganguly – College professor; Bullet's estranged wife; Phuli's mother. (2022)
- Prity Biswas as Mrinmayee "Mini" Ganguly Basu – An inborn singer; Anandi and Halua's daughter; Taan, Chorui, Phuli and Kabul's cousin; Debmalya's student and wife. (2021–2022)
- Debottam Majumdar as Debmalya Basu – A social worker; Mini's teacher and husband. (2022)
- Mainak Banerjee as Ganataan "Taan" Gangulyn – Chandreyi and Gablu's son; Chorui's brother; Mini, Phuli and Kabul's cousin; Kamalini's husband. (2021–2022)
- Ipsita Mukherjee as Kamalini Ganguly – Taan's wife. (2021–2022)
- Raja Goswami as Rishi Talukdar – Sreerupa's son; Chorui's husband. (2022)
- Rishav Chakraborty as Kabul Chatterjee – Ratulmoni's grandson; Mini, Taan, Chorui and Phuli's cousin. (2021–2022)
- Phalguni Chatterjee as Raghubir Chatterjee – A priest; Supriya's husband; Dolly and Lalon's father. (2021–2022)
- Rita Dutta Chakraborty as Supriya Chatterjee – Raghubir's wife; Dolly and Lalon's mother. (2021–2022)
- Sahana Sen as Dolly Chatterjee – Raghubir and Supriya's daughter; Lalon's sister; Swadesh's wife. (2021–2022)
- Shaktipada Dey as Subal Das – Arati's husband; Priya and Pooja's father; Phul's adoptive father and rival. (2021–2022)
- Rajasree Bhowmick as Arati Das – Subal's wife; Priya and Pooja's mother; Phuli's adoptive mother. (2021–2022)
- Deerghoi Paul as Priya Das Dutta – Subal and Arati's elder daughter; Pooja's sister; Phuli's adopted sister; Bittu's wife. (2021–2022)
- Avijit Das as Bittu Dutta – Priya's husband. (2021–2022)
- Asmee Ghosh as Pooja Das – Subal and Arati's younger daughter; Priya's sister; Phuli's adopted sister. (2021–2022)

=== Others ===
- Tathagata Mukherjee as Ankur Chatterjee – A NRI businessman; Lalon and Phuli's well-wisher. (2022)
- Ayeashrya Chatterjee as Munni – A nurse; Lalon's childhood friend and ex-lover. (2021)
- Satyam Majumder as Manik Das – A widower and father of three; Phuli's stalker and blackmailer. (2021–2022)
- Amritendu Kar as Lalon's friend. (2021)
- Debalina Banerjee as Phuljhuri's friend (2021)
- Manjusree Ganguly as Kamalini's mother (2021)
- Rahul Chakraborty as Kamalini's father (2021)
- Babul Supriyo as the presenter or host of the reality show (2022)
- Kumar Sanu as the judge of the reality show (2022)
- Debojyoti Mishra as the judge of the reality show (2022)
- Sujit Sen as Chorui's dance teacher (2022)
- Sarmistha as Sreerupa Talukdar – Chandreyi's friend; Rishi's mother. (2022)
- Deepjoy Bhattacharjee as Soumo – Chorui's friend. (2021–2022)
- Ambarish Bhattacharya as Dr. Rohit – Aditi's husband; Titir's father. (2022)
- Samata Das as Aditi – Rohit's wife; Titir's mother. (2022)
- Sampurna Mondal as Titir – Rohit and Aditi's daughter, Lalon's ex-wife. (2022)

== Production ==
=== Release ===
The on-air date was officially announced by Star Jalsha on 9 July 2021. The show was released on 19 July 2021. The last shoot was held at 30 November 2022. The last episode was telecasted on 11 December 2022.

== Reception ==
TRP ratings for 2021
Week	BARC viewership		Ref.
Week	TRP	Rank	Ref.
Week 31	6.4	7	
Week 32	6.7	8	
Week 33	6.3	10	
Week 34	6.9	8	
Week 35	7.8	5	
Week 36	7.2	6	
Week 37	7.7	6	
Week 38	7.5	5	
Week 39	7.0	5	
Week 40	6.8	7	
Week 41	6.2	7	
Week 42	7.1	7	
Week 43	7.1	6	
Week 44	6.2	10	
Week 45	6.3	10	
Week 46	6.6	10	
Week 47	7.4	5	
Week 48	7.0	7	
Week 49	7.6	6	
Week 50	7.1	9	
Week 51	7.7	7	
Week 52	7.7	9	

TRP ratings for 2022
Week	BARC viewership		Ref.
Week	TRP	Rank	Ref.
Week 1	8.7	4	
Week 2	8.2	5	
Week 3	8.2	8	
Week 4	9.3	3	
Week 5	9.8	2	
Week 6	8.7	5	
Week 7	9.0	4	
Week 8	8.3	4	
Week 9	9.3	2	
Week 10	8.1	7	
Week 11	7.8	8	
Week 12	7.8	10	
Week 13	7.3	6	
Week 14	7.4	6	
Week 15	7.5	2	
Week 16	8.1	1	
Week 17	8.3	1	
Week 18	7.1	3	
Week 19	8.9	2	
Week 20	7.7	3	
Week 21	7.9	3	
Week 22	7.4	4	
Week 23	7.2	3	
Week 24	7.4	3	
Week 25	8.0	1	
Week 26	9.3	1	
Week 27	8.4	1	
Week 28	7.9	2	
Week 29	7.5	5	
Week 30	6.8	6	
Week 31	6.5	5	
Week 32	6.7	6	
Week 33	6.7	6	
Week 34	7.2	6	
Week 35	7.1	5	
Week 36	7.6	3	
Week 37	8.2	1	
Week 38	8.0	2	
Week 39	7.1	4	
Week 40	6.7	3	
Week 41	7.6	2	
Week 42	8.3	1	
Week 43	8.0	1	
Week 44	7.8	1	
Week 45	7.3	3	
Week 46	7.0	4	
Week 47	7.1	4	
Week 48	7.2	6	
Week 49	7.1	6	
