= Kar Kachhe Koi Moner Kotha =

Indian Bengali television series

- Genre: Drama; Romance
- Created by: Organic Studios
- Written by: Dialogues; Leena Gangopadhyay
- Screenplay by: Leena Gangopadhyay
- Story by: Leena Gangopadhyay
- Directed by: Dipankar Dey
- Creative director: Leena Gangopadhyay
- Starring: Manali Dey; Dronn Mukherjee
- Theme music composer: Debojit Roy
- Country of origin: India
- Original language: Bengali
- No. of seasons: 1
- No. of episodes: 333

Production
- Executive producers: Paromita Sengupta (Organic Studios); Sramona Ghosh & Aniruddha Ghosh (Zee Bangla)
- Producer: Arka Ganguly
- Production location: Kolkata
- Cinematography: Pintu Si
- Editor: Sampriti Chakraborty
- Camera setup: Multi-camera
- Running time: 20-22 min approx.
- Production company: Organic Studios

Original release
- Network: Zee Bangla
- Release: 3 July 2023 – 21 June 2024

Kar Kachhe Koi Moner Kotha, also KKKMK, is an Indian Bengali language Romantic Drama television series that was broadcast on the Indian Bengali general entertainment channel Zee Bangla and is also available on the digital platform ZEE5. It premiered on 3 July 2023. The series is produced by Arka Ganguly under the banner of Organic Studios It stars Manali Dey, Dronn Mukherjee, Basabdatta Chatterjee, Srijani Mitra, Sneha Chatterjee and Sritama Bhattacharjee in lead roles.

Shimul is a modern, open-minded girl who loves to dance. However, she is thought to be a burden by her brothers. As a result, she marries Parag despite loving Shatadru. But she moves on and aims for a happy life with Parag. Parag, however, comes from a conservative family, which includes his mother, Madhubala, brother Palash, and sister, Putul, who has a mental disability. In her in-laws' household, no one cares about Shimul. Parag, Palash, and Madhubala torture and humiliate her in various ways. Despite this, three compassionate neighbors (Sucharita, Bipasha, and Shirsha) feel for her and protect her each time. Their friendship starts.

== Cast ==
=== Main ===
- Manali Dey as Shimul Banerjee (née Mitra): Shipra's daughter; Priyanka's rival; Pratiksha and Palash's enemy
- Dronn Mukherjee as Parag Banerjee (Former Antagonist turned to Main Lead): Madhubala's elder son; Priyanka's ex-fiancé
- Basabdatta Chatterjee as Sucharita Basu: Indradeep's widow; Swastika's rival
- Sneha Chatterjee as Bipasha Maitra (née Sen): Chandan's first wife; Madhurima's rival
- Srijani Mitra as Shirsha Chowdhury: Bishwadeep's wife
- Sritama Bhattacharjee as Putul Chatterjee (née Banerjee): A intellectually disabled girl; Madhubala's daughter; Ranja's rival
- Rita Dutta Chakraborty as Madhubala Banerjee (Former Antagonist): Putul, Parag and Palash's mother

=== Recurring ===
- Kuyasha Biswas as Pratiksha Banerjee (Main Antagonist): Shyamoli's daughter; Shimul's enemy and ill wisher
- Sounak Ray as Palash Banerjee aka Polu (2nd Main Antagonist): Madhubala's younger son; Shimul's enemy
- Raja Ghosh as Tirthankar Chatterjee aka Tirtha: Pratiksha's ex-husband
- Rumpa Das / Madhumita Roy as Drishti Banerjee aka Tutul: Kamallata and Mr. Banerjee's daughter
- Rajashree Bhowmik as Kamallata Banerjee: Mr. Banerjee's wife
- Shyamashis Pahari as Kamallata's husband
- Kaushiki Guha as Shipra Mitra: Sumit, Srijit, and Shimul's mother
- Indrajit Mazumdar as Sumit Mitra: Shipra's elder son
- Priyanka Halder as Mishti Mitra: Sumit's wife
- Unknown as Jholmol Mitra: Sumit and Mishti's toddler daughter
- Bimal Giri as Srijit Mitra: Shipra's younger son
- Poulomi Das as Kajari Mitra: Srijit's wife
- Arindam Chatterjee as Late Indradeep Basu aka Indra (Antagonist): Sucharita's husband; Swastika's ex-lover
- Krittika Chakraborty as Twinkle Basu: Sucharita and Indradeep's daughter
- Suchandra Chowdhury as Mrs. Basu (Antagonist): Indradeep's mother
- Shoumo Banerjee / Suman Banerjee as Chandan Mitra (Antagonist): Bipasha's ex-husband
- Prriyam Chakraborty as Madhurima Mitra: Chandan's second/illegal wife; Bipasha's rival
- Soma Banerjee as Chandan's mother
- Dwaipayan Das as Bishwadeep Chowdhury: Shirsha's husband
- Mou Bhattacharya as Bishwadeep's mother
- Indranil Mullick as Shatadru Mitra: Parama's brother; Shimul's ex-lover
- Rii Sen as Swastika: Indra's ex-lover; Sucharita's rival
- Sukanya Basu as Rachana Sengupta: District Magistrate; Shimul's supporter
- Barninee Chakraborty as Priyanka Das aka Priya: Parag's student and ex-fianceé; Shimul's rival
- Rumpa Chatterjee as Shyamoli: Pratiksha's mother
- Sandip Dey as Pratiksha's father
- Sushrita Ghosh as Parama Mitra: Shatadru's sister
- Madhumita Basu as Antara Mitra: Shatadru's mother
- Priyanka Chakraborty as Ruprekha: Shatadru's ex-fianceé
- Debaparna Chakraborty as Aradhana Chatterjee: Shimul's lawyer; Anirban's ex-wife
- Raja Goswami as Anirban Sen: Parag's lawyer; Aradhana's ex-husband
- Ankita Majumdar as Ranja Chatterjee: Tirtha's friend and elder sister-in-law; Putul's elder sister-in-law and rival
- Rajdeep Sarkar as Ranja's husband and Tirtha's brother
- Rahul Dev Bose as Arnab Sengupta: Police Superintendent
- Dipanjan Bhattacharya as Shimul's lawyer
- Esha Bhattacharjee as Shirsha's mother

== Controversy ==
Within a month of its release, the show courted controversy by showing Shimul's mother-in-law Madhubala (player by Rita Dutta Chakraborty) foiling Shimul's & Parag's wedding night by entering into their room uninvited, feigning illness & coercing Parag to sleep with her in the marriage bed, thereby forcing the newlywed Shimul to spend her wedding night sleepless on the couch. This particular scene intended to portray helicopter parenting, was instead criticised for supposedly promoting incest.
