= Bhootu =

Indian Bengali language children's comedy-drama television series

- Genre: Comedy; Drama
- Screenplay by: Ashrunu Moitra
- Story by: Sahana; Raghuvir Shekhawat; Damini Joshi; Dialogues; Malova Majumdar
- Directed by: Srijit Roy
- Creative director: Riya Sengupta
- Starring: Arshiya Mukherjee
- Theme music composer: Upaali Chatterjee
- Composer: Dony Hazarika
- Country of origin: India
- Original language: Bengali
- No. of seasons: 2
- No. of episodes: 301

Production
- Producers: Shrikant Mohta; Mahendra Soni
- Production location: Kolkata
- Cinematography: Hanif Sheikh
- Editors: Dharmesh Patel; Pramod kunder
- Camera setup: Multi-camera
- Running time: 22 minutes
- Production company: Shree Venkatesh Films

Original release
- Network: Zee Bangla
- Release: 14 March 2016 – 25 February 2017

Related
- Bhutu

Bhootu is an Indian Bengali language children's comedy-drama television series that aired on Zee Bangla. The series revolves around a friendly girl ghost named Bhootu, who always tries to help others, often causing light mischief and mayhem in the process. The show was rebooted in Hindi with same name as Bhutu for Zee TV and premiered on 21 August 2017.

Zee Bangla brought back Bhootu but in an animated version for every Sunday from 12 November 2017 to 29 May 2022.

== Cast ==
=== Main ===
- Arshiya Mukherjee as Bhutu Majumder / Putu Majumder, Bhutu's younger sister; Bhutu's lookalike; only on final episode

=== Recurring ===
- Subrata Guha Roy as Johor Dalal
- Animesh Bhaduri as Deepen Majumder as aka Deepu: Bhutu's father.
- Gita Mukherjee as Bhutu's paternal Grandmother (Thammi)
- Mimi Dutta as Sudha; Bhutu's mother
- Riyanka Dasgupta as Mallika Majumder aka Mishtu.(Mishti pisi)
- Ritoja Majumder / Sanjuktaa Roy Chowdhury as Krishna Majumder; Bhutu's paternal aunt(Jemma)
- Judhajit Banerjee as Bhutu's paternal uncle. (Jethu)
- Samriddho as Logence; Bhutu's close friend.
- Suman Banerjee as Prabol: Bhutu's maternal uncle.(Mama)
- Arpita Dutta Chowdhury as Swapna: Probal's wife, Bhutu's maternal aunt.(Mami)
- Saheli Ghosh Roy as Prabol and Swapna's daughter; Bhutu's maternal cousin
- Dwaipayan Das as Shayan; Nephew of Bhutu's paternal grandfather (Kannakaku)
- Avery Singha Roy as Arna: Shayan's wife, a karate player.(Karate Kaki)
- Sampurna Mondal as Ratri's daughter
- Prriyam Chakraborty as Borna; Ayon's wife.
- Soma Banerjee as Guruma
- Pallavi Mukherjee as Chaapa: a maid
- Ashmita Chakraborty as Munni: a maid
- Nayana Bandyopadhyay as Minu
- Arnab Vadra as Shibu Chor, Minu's brother (Pocha Rongkaku)
- Anindita Sarkar as Renu Pisi/ Neki pisi Thamma; Bhutu's maternal grand aunt
- Chaitali Chakraborty as Churni Pisi / Ragi pisi Thamma: Bhutu's elder grandaunt
- Kheyali Dastidar as Pune Pisi
- Prantik Banerjee as Boidujjo Bhowmik
- Riya Ganguly Chakraborty as Ratri: Shayan's sister
- Ranjini Chattopadhyay as Bhutu's maternal grandmother.(Dida)
- Basanti Chatterjee as Mrinal aka Meni: Bhutu's maternal grandaunt.(Masi Thammi)
- Alivia Sarkar as Tania; Bonna's sister, Somu's love interest, Bhutu's Ragi aunty
- Sourav Chatterjee as Somen Majumder aka Somu: Bhutu's paternal uncle.(Kakai)
- Sourav Das as Johor's nephew
- Amitava Bhattacharyya as Doctor
- Lily Chakravarty as Thummum; grandmother-in-law of Madhobi, Mouli and Lekha; paternal grandmother of Aniket, Ishani and Nirjhor.
- Anindita Raychaudhury as Madhobi / Madhu (as called by her husband) / Mummum; Bhutu's foster mother
- Biresh Chakraborty / Rajiv Bose as Aniket, Madhobi's husband; elder brother of Ishani and Nirjhor
- Manali Dey as Mouli / Bordidi; eldest daughter of third tenant family; Nirjhor's wife
- Anindya Chatterjee as Nirjhor / Bheeturaam Kaku; younger brother of Aniket and Ishani; Mouli's husband
- Sneha Chatterjee as Ishani/Ojha Pisi, sister of Aniket and Nirjhor, sister-in-law of Madhobi and Mouli
- Mou Bhattacharya as Surobhi, mother of Ishani, Aniket and Nirjhor; mother-in-law of Madhabi and Mouli
- Pritha Bandopadhyay as Roma; Dhiman and Disha's mother; Lekha's mother-in-law; paternal aunt of Aniket, Ishani and Nirjhor
- Elfina Mukherjee as Lekha
- Aritra Dutta as Dhiman, Roma's son; Lekha's husband
- Priya Malakar as Disha: Roma's daughter; Lekha's sister-in-law
- Boni Mukherjee as school teacher
- Ambarish Bhattacharya as school teacher
- Palash Ganguly as Palash;Mouli's former fiancé
- Moumita Chakrabarty / Dola Chakraborty as Konok; Mouli's stepmother. Bhutu's Gol Jethi
- Sakshi Dona Saha as Mouli's youngest step-sister
- Manasi Sinha as Logence's Pisi Thammi, paternal grandaunt
- Shraboni Bonik as Reetu; Logence's aunt (Jemma) and Rupsha's mother
- Rohit Mukherjee as Anup; Logence's uncle (Jethu) and Rupsha's father
- Fahim Mirza as Asit; Logence's father and Rupsha's uncle
- Anindita Bhattacharya as Tonu; Logence's mother and Rupsha's aunt
- Somjita Bhattacharya as Jilipi Masi: Maids of house
- Swarnadipto Ghosh as Amit; Logence and Rupsha's uncle (Kaka)
- Kanyakumari Mukherjee as Rumi; Logence and Rupsha's paternal aunt (Mishti Pisi)
- Aditya Roy as Bikram; Rumi's lover
- Anindya Banerjee as Ronodeep
- Goutam Mukherjee as Ronodeep's Paternal Uncle, Anup's Boss
- Ishita Chatterjee as Ronodeep's mother

== Adaptations ==
Language	Title	Original release	Network(s)	Last aired	Notes
Bengali	Bhootu ভুতু	14 March 2016	Zee Bangla	25 February 2017	Original
Hindi	Bhutu भुतू	21 August 2017	Zee TV	15 June 2018	Remake
