= Rooqma Ray =

Indian Television actress

Rukma Ray
- Born: 23 January 1994 (age 32)
- Occupation: Actor
- Years active: 2014–present
- Notable work: Kiranmala, Desher Maati, Pratidaan, Khorkuto, Lalkuthi, Super Singer Junior, Rahasya Romancha, Byomkesh

Rooqma Ray (also known as Rukma Roy; Bengali: রুকমা রায়) is an Indian television actress who predominantly appears in Bengali TV soap operas. She is known for playing the lead characters of Rajkumari Kiranmala in Kiranmala and Mampi in Desher Maati.

== Filmography ==
=== Films ===
- Gopone Mod Chharan (2023)

== Television ==
- All soap operas are in Bengali language, unless otherwise mentioned.

| Year | Title | Role | Channel | Notes | Ref. |
|---|---|---|---|---|---|
| 2014–2016 | Kiranmala | Rajkumari Kiranmala | Star Jalsha | Lead role | |
| 2017–2018 | Kundo Phooler Mala | Ghungur/ Annapurna | Star Jalsha | Lead role | |
| 2018 | Pratidaan | Madhushree | Star Jalsha | Antagonist | |
| 2019 | Super Singer Junior | Host | Star Jalsha | Host | |
| 2019 | Thakumar Jhuli | Princess Swarnamala | Star Jalsha | Episodic role | |
| 2020 | Bagh Bondi Khela | Brinda | Zee Bangla | Main Antagonist | |
| 2020–2022 | Khorkuto | Ananya Sengupta aka Tinni | Star Jalsha | Main Antagonist | |
| 2021 | Desher Maati | Rai Mukherjee aka Mampi | Star Jalsha | 2nd Lead Role | |
| 2022 | Laalkuthi | Anamika Roy Chowdhury/Ujjaini Dutta aka Jini | Zee Bangla | Lead Role | |
| 2023–2024 | Roopsagore Moner Manush | Annapurna "Purna" Mukherjee Dutta Chowdhury | Sun Bangla | Lead Role | |
| 2024 | Tumi Ashe Pashe Thakle | Parvati | Star Jalsha | Lead Role | |
| 2025 | S.I.T. Bengal | Romi De Suza | Zee Bangla Shonar | Lead Role | |

=== Awards ===
| Year | Title | Category | Role | Serial |
|---|---|---|---|---|
| 2015 | Star Jalsha Parivar Awards 2015 | Priyo Meye | Kiranmala | Kiranmala |
| 2018 | Telly Academy Awards 2018 | Best Actress | Ghungur | Kundo Phooler Mala |
| 2021 | Kolkata Glitz Awards 2021 | Most Notable Performance Female | Mampi | Desher Maati |

=== Mahalaya ===
- Singhabahini Trinayani as Devi Skandamata (2022) on Zee Bangla.

=== Web series ===
| Year | Title | Platform | Notes | Ref. |
|---|---|---|---|---|
| 2020 | Rahasya Romancha | Hoichoi | Season 3 | |
| 2021 | Byomkesh | Hoichoi | Season 6 | |
| 2023 | Roktokorobi | ZEE5 | | |
| 2023 | Noshtoneer | Hoichoi | | |
| 2023 | Red Canvas | Hippiix | | |
| 2023 | Noshtoneer 2 | Hoichoi | Season 2 | |
| 2025 | Medium | Aaro Anando | Season 3 | |
