= Bhutu =

Indian Hindi language children's comedy-drama television series

- Genre: Comedy; Drama
- Screenplay by: Rahul Pandey
- Story by: Sahana; Raghuvir Shekhawat; Damini Joshi
- Directed by: Hemant N Mishra
- Creative director: Riya Sengupta
- Starring: Arshiya Mukherjee; Sana Amin Sheikh; Kinshuk Mahajan; Akanksha Chamola; Anjali Priya
- Theme music composer: Prakash, Viraj; Title Song Lyrics; Sanjeev Tiwari
- Composer: Dony Hazarika
- Country of origin: India
- Original language: Hindi
- No. of episodes: 214

Production
- Producers: Shrikant Mohta; Mahendra Soni
- Production location: Naigaon
- Cinematography: Hanif Sheikh
- Editors: Dharmesh Patel; Pramod Kunder
- Camera setup: Multi-camera
- Running time: 22 minutes
- Production company: Shree Venkatesh Films

Original release
- Network: Zee TV
- Release: 21 August 2017 – 15 June 2018

Related
- Bhootu

Bhutu is an Indian Hindi language children's comedy-drama television series which aired on Zee TV. The series revolves around a friendly girl ghost, "Bhutu", who always tries to help others, often causing light mischief and mayhem in the process. It is an adaptation of the Bengali series Bhootu by Zee Bangla. The show replaced Bin Kuch Kahe in its timeslot.

== Plot ==
Bhutu is a story about a cute little ghost. The show revolves around Pihu/Bhutu, a 7-year-old friendly ghost who still longs for her mother after her untimely death. Though she loves to play with her friends, she is very sad and disheartened that no one can see her. One day, Gopal (Krishna) appears as her companion and promises that he will help her reunite with her mother.

== Cast ==
=== Main ===
- Arshiya Mukherjee as Pihu Subodh Bose (Bhutu) / Shona (Bhutu's doppelganger)
- Viraj Kapoor as Baal Gopal (Krishna)
- Sana Amin Sheikh as Suchi Sharma / Suchi Aarav Randhawa / Burburi
- Kinshuk Mahajan as Aarav Randhawa
- Akanksha Chamola as Anandita Subodh Bose

=== Recurring ===
- Kapil Nirmal as Vikram
- Khushbu Thakkar as Barbie
- Shivangi Verma as Mohini
- Tushar Khanna as Badripasad / Bobby
- Aliraza Namdar as Barbie's father
- Sameer Sharma / Vimarsh Roshan as Subodh Bose (Pihu's father)
- Dharmik Joisar as Gulgule Sharma
- Tanushree Kaushal as Aarav's mother
- Neetha Shetty as Mansi Randhawa, Aarav's sister
- Cindrella Dcruz as Suman, Suchi's Chhoti Maa
- Vipin Krishan Chahal as Sankalp Sharma, Suchi's brother
- Anjali Priya as Sheetal Sankalp Sharma
- Gaurav Vasudev as Tantarik (Bhootnath)
- Archana Mittal as Sarita Sharma, Suchi's mother
- Karim Hajee as Shuchi's father
- Drishti Chopra as Pooja, Suchi's friend
- Neeraj Goswami as Rishabh
- Shalini Vishnudev as Rakhi Mehta

== Adaptations ==
Language	Title	Original release	Network(s)	Last aired	Notes
Bengali	Bhootu ভুতু	14 March 2016	Zee Bangla	25 February 2017	Original
Hindi	Bhutu भुतू	21 August 2017	Zee TV	15 June 2018	Remake
