= Mohit Ray =

Indian activist and writer (born 1954)

- মোহিত রায়
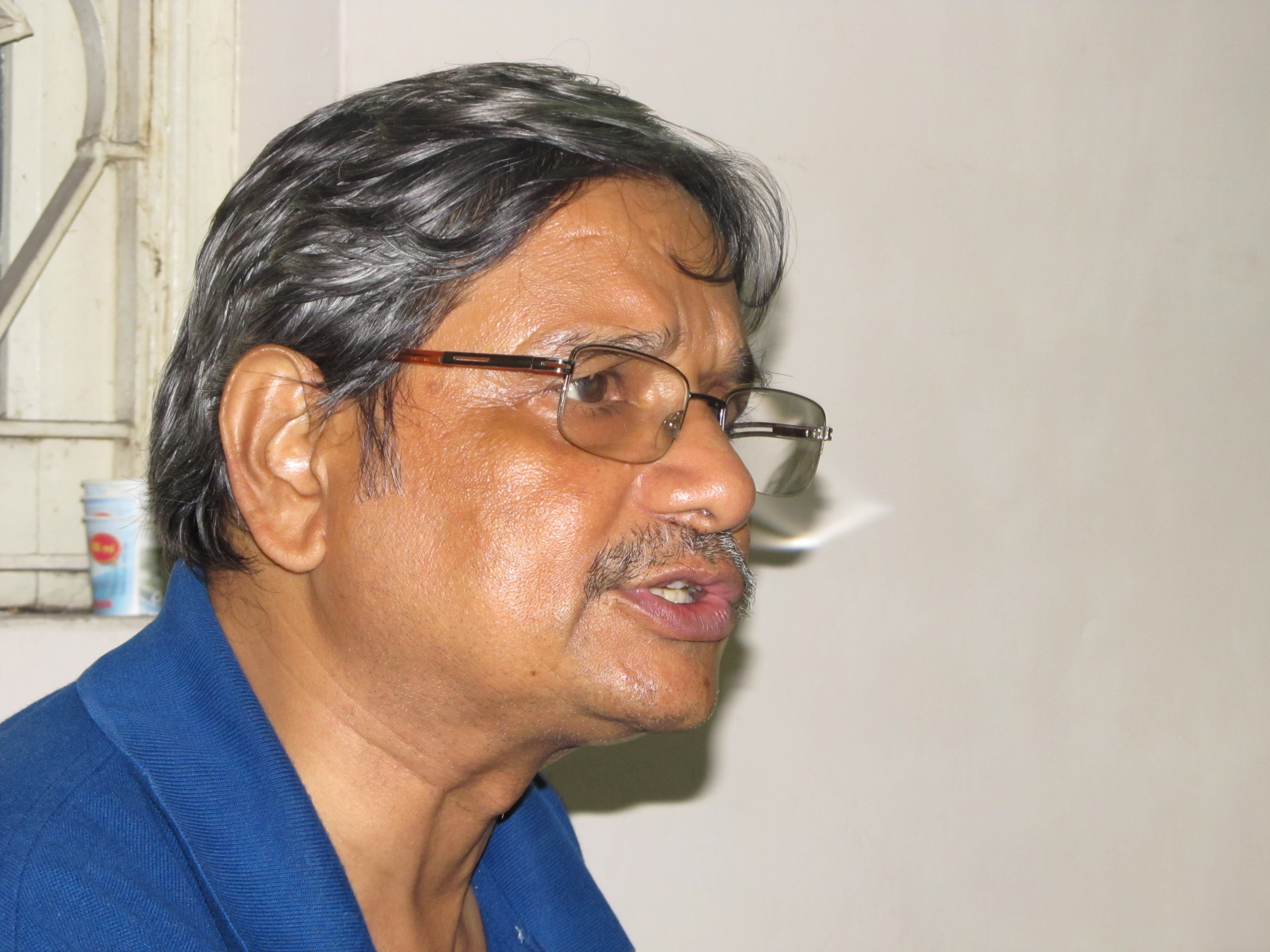
- Ray in 2012
- Born: 1954 (age 71–72); Kolkata, West Bengal, India
- Education: Jadavpur University
- Occupations: Environmental activist Human rights activist

Mohit Ray (born 1954) is an Indian environmental and human rights activist based in Kolkata. He has campaigned for saving the Adi Ganga, Bikramgarh Jheel and other water bodies of Kolkata. His seminal work in this field is the extensive research on the water bodies and heritage ponds of Kolkata. His work has been published by the Kolkata Municipal Corporation and Ananda Publishers. He has also published a number of papers in technical journals. He writes regularly on environmental issues in different journals including The Statesman, a national daily, in Anandabazar Patrika, Ei Samay and Bartaman, the Bengali dailies. He has also campaigned for a long time against the persecution of minorities in Bangladesh and the citizenship rights of the Bengali Hindu refugees.

== Early life and career ==
Mohit Ray was born in Kolkata into a Bengali Hindu migrant family from East Bengal in 1954. He graduated in chemical engineering from Jadavpur University in 1976. In 1979, he completed his post-graduation from the University of Manchester. A year later, he joined Engineers India Limited and relocated to New Delhi. In 1988, he joined Development Consultants Limited and shifted to Kolkata. In 1995, Ray quit Development Consultants and began independent consultancy. He has worked as a consultant for a number of World Bank and Asian Development Bank projects. He has been a visiting faculty in the Environment Programme for M.Phil. at the School of Environmental Studies of Jadavpur University, in the Academic Staff College of Jadavpur University and in the Environmental Management Department of the Indian Institute of Social Welfare and Business Management. He completed his Ph.D. in engineering from Jadavpur University in 2005. He is a small-time BJP leader; he fought in the 2016 assembly election in Bengal from Jadavpur with a BJP ticket and lost.

== Environmental activism ==
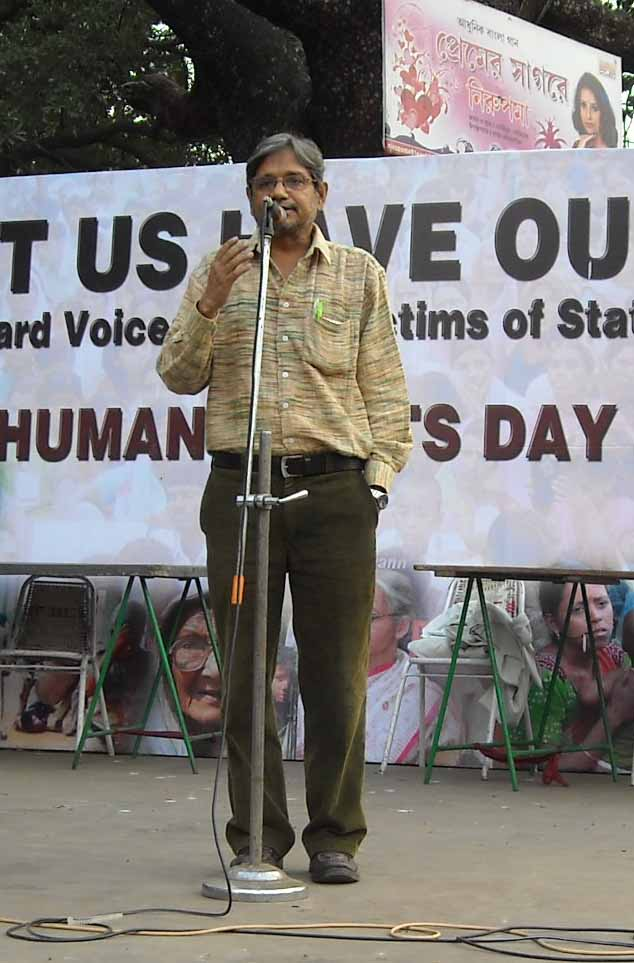
Ray speaking on World Human Rights Day, 2011

Ray has remained in the forefront of environmental activism in Kolkata for the last two and half decades. He has been associated with a number of NGOs involved in environmental activities and he leads a small non-funded group named Vasundhara. He has been an active participant or adviser to efforts such as restoring water bodies, saving Adi Ganga, questioning concreting the water bodies to rights of bicycle riders as a non-polluting vehicle. The discovery, identification and documentation of 48 heritage water bodies of Kolkata and environmental and social details of several thousand water bodies of Kolkata constitute his seminal work in this field. Ray believes that the possibility of serious water and environmental crisis due to diminishing numbers of water bodies in the city can only be addressed by better management of the existing water bodies through technological innovations. For Ray, environment cannot be delinked from peoples' livelihood concerns, so he emphasizes environmental improvement, along with development.

== Human rights activism ==
Ray has been active in social issues from his student days. At Jadavpur University, he was the founder convener of the Democratic Students Front, the student organization formed after the Emergency was lifted. His concern for human rights led him to become an executive member of the People's Union for Democratic Rights and the joint secretary of the Association for the Protection of Democratic Rights. For a decade, he has organized a campaign for the human rights of the Hindu-Buddhist-Christian minorities in Bangladesh through the auspices of CAAMB. In May 2014, Ray along with other delegates of several human rights bodies from various countries, met the Indian president Pranab Mukherjee to convey to him the human rights issues plaguing the minorities of Bangladesh.

== Publications ==
Ray has written a number of books in Bengali and English published by reputed publishers. He has also written fiction based on the theme of environment.

=== Non-fiction ===
- Pukurer Rupkatha (2015), Shishu Sahitya Sangsad, ISBN 9788179552803
- Paschim Bangladesh (2015), CAMP, ISBN 8186883266
- Five Thousand Mirrors - The Water Bodies of Kolkata (2015), Jadavpur University Press, ISBN 9788192676777
- Kalikata Pukurkatha - Paribesh Itihas Samaj (2013), Ananda Publishers, ISBN 9789350402733
- Bangladesh O Paschimbanga - Kichu Bidhibaddha Satarkikaran (2013), Camp, ISBN 8186883797
- Old Mirrors – Traditional Ponds of Kolkata (2010), Kolkata Municipal Corporation
- Paribesher Jatpat - Garib Deshe Paribesh O Unnayan (2010), Gangchil
- Batas Hok Madhumay (2002), Anustup
- Bitarker Paribesh (2002), Anustup
- Paribesh: Atibeguni Rashmi Theke Himalay Dushan (1998), Progressive Publishers, ISBN 8186383565
- Prasanga Paribesh - Darshan Rajniti Bijnan (1992), Anustup, ISBN 8185479003

=== Fiction ===
- Gachhera Meyera - Nari O Paribesher Galpa (2000)
- Ekti Abadharita Mrityur Dharabibarani (1990)
- Mahadeb Nayek Mar Kachhe Jachchhe O Anyanya Galpa (1983)

=== Articles ===
- Ray, Mohit, and Majumder, S. (2005). "Evaluating Economic Sustainability Of Urban And Peri-Urban Waterbodies - A Case Study From Kolkata Ponds". Evaluating Economic Sustainability Of Urban And Peri-Urban Waterbodies - A Case Study From Kolkata Ponds (edited by Sengupta, Nirmal and Bandyopadhyay, Jayanta). MacMillan. New Delhi.
- Ray, Mohit (2004). Energy, CDM and Quality of Life. Resource Conservation and Management Systems – Concepts and Case Studies (edited by Ghosh, Sadhan K.). Oxford Publishing House. Kolkata.
- Ray, Mohit (2002). Nuclear Fallout – On Environment and Politics. India's Nuclear Policy (edited by Ghosh, A.). Progressive Publishers. Kolkata.
- Ray, Mohit (2001). Environmental Impact Assessment and Audit: A Management Approach. Industrial Pollution. (edited Mukherjea, R. N., et al.). Allied Publishers. New Delhi.
