= Gautam Sen =

Indian journalist

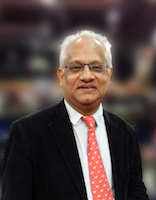
- Education: Calcutta Boys’ School, Calcutta; Presidency College, Calcutta; XLRI, Jamshedpur
- Occupations: Writer, Journalism, Consultancy
- Notable credit(s): Founder Editor of India's first automobile magazine, Vice President at FIVA
- Website: www.gautamsen.com

Gautam Sen is an Indian journalist, writer and automotive design consultant and expert. He is the Vice President Communications at the Fédération Internationale de Véhicules Anciens (FIVA). Sen founded India's first newsstand car magazine, Indian Auto, in 1986 and later launched Auto India, as well as the Indian editions of auto motor und sport and BBC's TopGear magazine. He has collaborated with designers like Gerard Godfroy, Tom Tjaarda, and Marcello Gandini. Since 2010, he has published several books on automobiles.

== Career ==
Gautam Sen is an Indian journalist, writer, and automotive design consultant. He joined Maruti Udyog Limited's marketing department in 1984, leaving in 1986. Sen then began his journalism career at Business Press Pvt Ltd, where he launched The Indian Auto Journal in 1986 and later became the Editor of Auto India magazine in 1993. In 1996, he moved to Paris to manage the San Storm sports car project. Sen joined Motorpresse Stuttgart in 2000, launching the Indian edition of auto motor und sport in 2001. In 2005, he founded the Indian edition of BBC's TopGear magazine. Returning to Business India Group in 2007, he resumed leadership of Auto India magazine.

As a consultant, Sen has worked with various Indian and European automobile manufacturers, including Hero Motors, TVS-Suzuki, Hindustan Motors, and Tata Motors, and managed the development of India's first sports car, the San Storm. He has collaborated with designers like Gerard Godfroy, Tom Tjaarda, and Marcello Gandini.

Sen holds the position of Vice President at the Fédération Internationale de Véhicules Anciens (FIVA) and serves as a jury member for several prestigious automobile events, including Le Mans Classic, Chantilly Arts & Elegance, the YanQi Island Concours d’Elegance, and the Rally International du Pays de Fougères, Dinard Elegance, Tonneins Concours d'Élégance, and the Sinaia Concours d’Elegance.

== Honours and awards ==
Sen won the "Book of the Year" award in 2017 at the Festival Automobile International, in Paris, in January 2017 and Best Automotive Biography of the Year by Auto Bild Motorworld Buchpreiss for his work Marcello Gandini: Maestro of Design. In 2020, Sen, along with his co-author Daniel Cabart, won the Nicolas-Joseph Cugnot Award from the Society of Automotive Historians Book as well as the Prix Bellecour in France for the book Ballot. The Bertone Collection and Tom Tjaarda: Master of Perfection won the Motorworld Buchpreis, and the latter also won the Society of Automotive Historian Award of Distinction and the AACA's Thomas McKean Memorial Cup.

== Books ==
- Joyaux automobiles des Maharadjahs (E.T.A.I.)
- The Maharajas & Their Magnificent Motor Cars (Haynes)
- The Car Design Book (The Business India Group)
- Die Traumgaragen der Maharadschas (Heel)
- Rolls-Royce 17EX A Fabulous Destiny ein Stuck Geschichte
- A Million Cars for a Billion People (Platinum Press)
- Marcello Gandini: Maestro of Design (Dalton Watson)
- The 101 Automotive Jewels of India (Heritage Publishers)
- The Bertone Collection (Dalton Watson)
- Ballot (Dalton Watson)
- Tom Tjaarda: Master of Perfection (Dalton Watson)
- The Automobile: An Indian Love Affair (Penguin)
- Lamborghini: At The Cutting Edge of Design (Dalton Watson)
- Bugatti: The Italian Decade (Dalton Watson)
- The Art of Conservation: Alfa Romeo SZ Coda Tronca (Dalton Watson)

== See also ==
- Robert Cumberford
