= Roktokorobi (TV series) =

Indian Bengali-language web-series

- Promotional poster for Roktokorobi
- Genre: Crime Thriller
- Written by: Sahana Dutta
- Directed by: Sayantan Ghosal
- Starring: Raima Sen; Vikram Chatterjee; Rooqma Ray
- Music by: Binit Ranjan Moitra
- Country of origin: India
- Original language: Bengali
- No. of episodes: 11

Production
- Producers: Sahana Dutta; Rohit Samanta

Original release
- Network: ZEE5
- Release: 3 February 2023

Roktokorobi is a Bengali thriller drama web-series starring Raima Sen, Vikram Chatterjee, Rooqma Ray, Tulika Basu, Laboni Sarkar, Shantilal Mukherjee, Bhaswar Chatterjee, Abhijit Guha and Haridas Chatterjee. It is produced by Sahana Dutta and Rohit Samanta and directed by Sayantan Ghoshal. The series premiered on ZEE5 on 3 February 2023.

== Plot ==
The story revolves around psychologist Satyaki (Vikram Chatterjee) visiting his aunt's place in a Uraldanga and comes across several mysteries in the house.

== Cast ==
- Vikram Chatterjee: Satyaki
- Raima Sen: Ranja
- Tulika Basu: Satyabati
- Haridas Chatterjee: Kalyan (Bhulu Jethu)
- Shantilal Mukherjee: Radhaprasanna
- Laboni Sarkar: Bithi
- Bhaswar Chatterjee: Saibal
- Rooqma Ray: Bidula
- Angana Ray: Meghla
- Kinjal Nanda: Ashish

== Marketing ==
The trailer of Roktokorobi was released on 16 January 2022.

== Reception ==
Sangbad Pratidin rated it 3 out of 5 stars. Rating the show 4 out of 5 stars, OTTplay in its review commented, "Despite the lacunas, Roktokorobi is a fantastic production. A crime and its multidimensional perspectives are beautifully addressed in the show."
