= Manali Dey =

Indian film and television actress

- Born: Picnic Garden, Kolkata
- Other name: Manali Manisha Dey
- Occupation: Actress
- Years active: 2007–present
- Known for: Gotro, Praktan, Bou Kotha Kao, Dhulokona etc.
- Spouses: Saptak Bhattacharjee (m. 2012; div. 2016); Abhimanyu Mukherjee (m. 2020)

Manali Dey (sometimes Manali De and Manali Manisha Dey) is an Indian television actress. She made her acting debut in the Bengali film Kali Aamar Maa in 1999. Later she made her television debut in the television serial Neer Bhanga Jhor and is very popular for her role as Mouri in Star Jalsha's Bou Kotha Kao.

== Biography ==
Manali spent her childhood in Picnic Garden, Kolkata. However, later she moved from there. She is the only child of her parents Nitai Dey and Manisha Dey. She completed her Secondary exams from Oxford House, Ballygunge, Kolkata. In the meantime, she had already started her acting career and became extremely busy. This made her unable to continue her study in the regular mode and so, she was admitted to Amrit Academy, Kankurgachi, which is a private open-board school. From here, she completed her higher secondary examination. She got her dancing lessons from her mother and Madhumita Roy. At this time, she was having a very tough schedule managing her education as well as career. Later, on 29 November 2012, Manali married singer Saptak Bhattacharjee. The couple have divorced.

== Career ==
Manali made her acting debut in the Bengali film Kali Aamar Maa in 1999 where she played the role of a child. After this, she became very interested in acting and made it her aim of life. She made her first breakthrough as a model for the Bengali magazine Unish-Kuri, while carrying on her school life. After making some few photos for the magazine, Manali got a call from Ravi Ojha's production house for working in Bengali television. Later on, she was cast in the Bengali television serial Neer Bhanga Jhor, which was aired on STAR Jalsha. Since then, she had been cast in a number of Bengali films and television serials.

=== Political career ===
In February 2021, just before the 2021 West Bengal Legislative Assembly election, she joined All India Trinamool Congress in presence of Chief Minister of West Bengal, Mamata Banerjee.

== Filmography ==
Manali has acted in several Bengali films since 1999.

Year	Film	Role	Director	Notes
1999	Kali Aamar Maa		Shantilal Soni	Child artist
2009	Rajdrohi		Tapan Banerjee	
2010	Achin Pakhi	Pakhi	Anjan Das	
2010	Sthaniyo Sangbad		Arjun Gourisaria, Moinak Biswas	
2016	Praktan	Ajay's wife	Nandita Roy, Shiboprosad Mukherjee	
2017	Nimki Fulki	Nimki	Abhimanyu Mukherjee	
2018	Adventures of Jojo	Jojo's maternal aunt	Raj Chakraborty	
2018	Purnimar Chand	Purnima	Rabin Das	
2018	Aalor Sathi	Aalo	Raaj Mukherjee	
2019	Gotro	Jhuma	Nandita Roy, Shiboprosad Mukherjee	
2020	Nimki Fulki 2	Nimki	Abhimanyu Mukherjee	
2021	Lockdown	Anuradha	Abhimanyu Mukherjee	

== Television ==
Year	Serial	Role	Channel	Notes
2008–2009	Neer Bhanga Jhor		Star Jalsha	Side role
2008–2009	Mohona		Zee Bangla	Side role
2009–2012	Bou Kotha Kao	Mayurakshi (Mouri)	Star Jalsha	Lead role
2012	Checkmate	Gouri	Star Jalsha	Episodic Role
2012–2013	Rannaghar - Sunday Special	Host	Zee Bangla	
2013–2014	Sokhi	Ishani	Star Jalsha	Lead role
2015–2016	Bhule Jeona Please	Nidhi	Colors Bangla	Lead role
2016	Mahanayak	Nibedita Roy	Star Jalsha	Supporting role
2016	Bhootu	Mouli	Zee Bangla	Supporting role
2017	Jai Kali Kalkattawali	Manjari	Star Jalsha	Special appearance
2018	Jamai Raja	Paromita	Zee Bangla	Episodic role
2018–2020	Nokshi Kantha	Shabnam & Aparajita	Zee Bangla	Lead role
2021–2022	Dhulokona	Phuljhuri	Star Jalsha	Lead role
2023–2024	Kar Kachhe Koi Moner Kotha	Shimul	Zee Bangla	Lead role
2025	Duggamoni O Baghmama	Gayatri	Zee Bangla	Lead role
2026–Present	Sangsarer Sankirtan	Shantilota	Star Jalsha	Lead role

== Mahalaya ==
Year	Serial	Role	Channel
2015	Mahisasuramardini	Dance Performance	Colors Bangla
2019	12 Mashe 12 Rupe Debibaran	Devi Shakambari	Zee Bangla
2022	Ya Chandi	Devi Mahamaya	Star Jalsha
2023	Nobopotrikaye Debibaran	Devi Shokorohita	Zee Bangla
2026	Rupe Rupantare Mahisasurmardini	Devi Bhramari	Star Jalsha

== Awards ==
Year	Award	Category	Character	Film/TV show
2011	Star Jalsha Parivaar Awards 2011	Priyo Bou	Mouri	Bou Kotha Kao
2011	Star Jalsha Parivaar Awards 2011	Priyo Juti (with Riju)	Mouri-Nikhil	Bou Kotha Kao
2012	Star Jalsha Parivaar Award 2012	Priyo Bou	Mouri	Bou Kotha Kao
2019	Telly Academy Award 2019	Priyo Nayika	Shabnam	Nokshi Kantha
2020	Zee Bangla Sonar Sansar Award 2020	Priyo Nayika	Shabnam	Nokshi Kantha
2022	Star Jalsha Parivaar Awards 2022	Domdaar Sodosyo	Phuljhuri	Dhulokona
2024	Zee Bangla Sonar Sansar Award 2024	Priyo Bouma	Shimul	Kar Kachhe Koi Moner Kotha
2024	Tolly Cine Somman 2024	Best Actor (Female)	Shimul	Kar Kachhe Koi Moner Kotha

== See also ==
- Ritabhari Chakraborty
- Mimi Chakraborty
- Sampurna Lahiri
- Parno Mittra
- Ridhima Ghosh
- Surjit Saha
- Tina Dutta
