= Rii Sen =

Indian actress (born 1978)

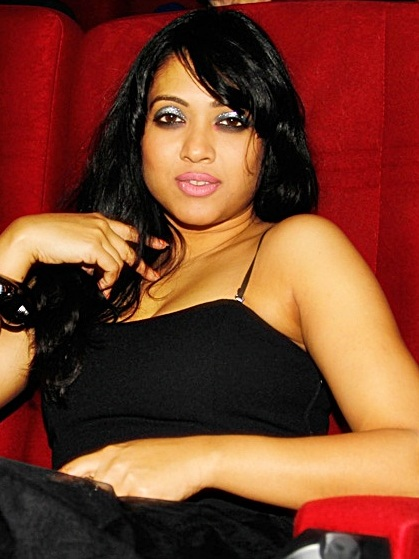
- Sen at Berlinale in 2011
- Born: Rituparna Sen; Kolkata, West Bengal
- Occupation: Actress
- Known for: Bigg Boss Bangla; Trinayani

Rii Sen (born Rituparna Sen) is an Indian actress who works in Bengali cinema. She started her career as a freelance model and television actress. Her debut film was Tepantorer Mathe, but it was not released in theatres because of obscene scenes. Sen was a contestant in Bigg Boss Bangla season 2 and was the 2nd runner up in the show. She has acted in movies like Bishh, Gandu, and Cosmic Sex.

Sen is considered a notable actress of alternative Bengali cinema. She won a best actress award at Osian's Cinefan Festival of Asian and Arab Cinema for her movie Cosmic Sex.

== Career ==
=== Early career ===
She has acted in a few television series such as Tithir Otithi, Ekhane Akash Neel and short films.

=== Film career ===
==== 2009–2011 ====
Sen acted in Tepantorer Mathe, which was her debut feature film, but it was not released. In 2009 Sen worked in a documentary, Love in India, directed by Qaushiq Mukherjee. The subject of the documentary was dehotatwa (worshiping through one's body). In the same year she acted in another documentary, Many Stories of Love and Hate, directed by Shyamal Karmakar. The documentary was screened at the Mumbai International Film Festival in 2010.

In 2009, she acted in Bissh, directed by Qaushiq Mukherjee. In this film Rii played the character Anushka, a college student. According to Rii, this was a very complex role and playing the character was very tough for her. She said in an interview, "I play Bee in Bishh... Bee is not a simple, straightforward girl. She is complicated, confused yet confident. Maybe that's why she is called Bee. I almost lost my identity while getting into the skin of the character."

In the 2010 film Gandu, Sen played a lead role. For the character, Sen was required to portray frontal nudity. Qaushiq Mukherjee, the director of the film, said in an interview that he cast Rii because she was the only heroine (of the Bengali film industry) who could have played this role. IBNLive appreciated the work of Rii and wrote in their review, "All the characters have put in their best efforts. Both Komolika and Rii have exuberated confidence in all the sex scenes, showing their maturity as actresses." In the 2010 film Autograph, directed by Srijit Mukherji, Sen played a minor role.

==== 2011–present ====
Sen acted in 2012 film Koyekti Meyer Golpo, directed by Subrata Sen. In this film she played the wife of a don. She also acted in the Bengali film Cosmic Sex, directed by Amitabh Chakraborty. The story of the film revolves around a young man's sexual self-discovery. Kripa, the young man, meets a prostitute, a eunuch and a female ascetic named Sadhana during his journey. The film was screened at Osian's film festival and got a warm reception.

Sen appeared as Horotoni in the 2013 film Tasher Desh, directed by Q aka Qaushiq Mukherjee. The film has been described as "trippy adaptation" of the Rabindrath Tagore's namesake play by Indian medias.

According to a newspaper report published in The Times of India in May 2013, Sen is acting in debutant director Anirban Mukherjee's Byanka Prithibi. In this film she is playing the character of a housewife. In 2014 it was announced that Rii would appear in Q (Quashiq Mukherjee) and Nikon's upcoming movie 'LUDO', playing a role not previously seen on Indian screens.

=== Television career ===
She has appeared in serials like Trinayani in Zee Bangla Dhrubotara, Star Jalsha and Star Jalsha's Durga Durgeshwari, Jai Kali Kalkattawali and Sanjher Baati.

== Sen as an actress of alternative cinema ==
Sen is regarded as a prominent actress of alternative Bengali cinema. In an article of Mint, the performances of Sen was described as "the common link between a set of films that has been challenging the norms of acceptability and decorum in the past few years."

Sen shot full frontal nude scenes in Gandu and Cosmic Sex. Though Paoli Dam is generally credited as the first Indian actress to shoot full nude scenes, according to a report of The Times of India, Sen went for frontal nudity scene six months before Dam's work. Sen tohas said she was happy that she could use her body for "a great cinematic purpose". She adeed, "As an artiste, I feel, it's important to record the passing time through one's work. And I don't want my work to be seen as gimmick of any sort."

== Filmography ==
Year	Film	Role	Director
2009	Love in India		Qaushiq Mukherjee
2009	Many Stories of Love And Hate		Shyamal Karmakar
2009	Bishh		Qaushiq Mukherjee
2010	Jodi Ekdin		Riingo Banerjee
2010	Autograph		Srijit Mukherji
2010	Gandu		Qaushiq Mukherjee
2012	Koyekti Meyer Golpo		Subrata Sen
2012	Charuulata 2011		Agnidev Chatterjee
2013	Tasher Desh		Qaushiq Mukherjee
2015	Cosmic Sex		Amitabh Chakraborty
2015	Ludo		Qaushik Mukherjee, Nikon
2021	Malini		Arpan Basak

== Television ==
- Bigg Boss Bangla season 2
- Ekhane Akash Neel
- Byata betir Battle
- Jai Kali Kalkattawali
- Trinayani
- Dhrubatara
- Khukumoni Home Delivery
- Durga Durgeshwari
- Uron Tubri
- Ke Prothom Kache Eshechi
- Tentulpataa
- Video Bouma (Later Replaced by Rimjhim Mitra)
- Flip (TV series)

== See also ==
- Paoli Dam
- Nandana Sen
