= Trinayani (Bengali TV series) =

2019 Indian Bengali language TV series

- Genre: Drama; Supernatural; Conspiracy
- Created by: Shree Venkatesh Films
- Screenplay by: Sarbari Ghoshal; Dialogues; Suparna Ghoshal
- Story by: Sahana
- Directed by: Swarnedu Samadder
- Creative director: Sahana
- Presented by: SVF Entertainment
- Starring: Shruti Das; Gourab Roy Chowdhury
- Voices of: Madhuraa Bhattacharya
- Country of origin: India
- Original language: Bengali
- No. of episodes: 423

Production
- Producers: Shrikant Mohta; Mahendra Soni
- Production location: Kolkata
- Camera setup: Multi-camera
- Running time: 22 minutes
- Production company: Shree Venkatesh Films

Original release
- Network: Zee Bangla
- Release: 4 March 2019 – 26 July 2020

Trinayani is an Indian Bengali language television supernatural soap opera that premiered on 4 March 2019 and aired on Bengali GEC Zee Bangla. The show starred Gourab Roy Chowdhury and Shruti Das. The story of the girl who can foresee the future was well received by the audience.

== Cast ==
=== Main ===
- Shruti Das as Trinayani Basu aka Nayan.
- Gourab Roy Chowdhury as Driptobroto Basu aka Dipu.

=== Recurring ===
- Jasmine Roy as Jasmine / Jessi, Nayan's rival, Driptobroto Basu's ex fiancee, obsessive lover
- Debjani Chattopadhyay as Sanjukta Basu Dripto's step-mother, Topobroto's second wife.
- Sujoy Prasad Chatterjee / Sourav Chatterjee as Vicky Deb - Sanjukta's younger brother.
- Siddhartha Banerjee as Dr.Devdut - Eye specialist and also Nayan's well-wisher.
- Yuvraj Chowdhury as Jasmine's husband.
- Moyna Mukherjee as Kalpana Basu - Dripto's late mother.
- Kaushiki Guha as Trinayani's mother.
- Priya Malakar as Kumu: Trinayani's Sister.
- Mita Chatterjee as Kripamoyee Basu- Dripto's grandmother, Topobroto's mother.
- Bodhisattwa Majumder as Topobroto Basu- Dripto's father, Kalpana and Sanjukta's husband.
- Pushpita Mukherjee as Protima Basu - Dripto's aunt, Topobroto's younger brother's wife, a drunkard.
- Aditya Chowdhury as Piku Basu - Dripto's half-brother, Sanjukta-Tapobroto's elder son, Rangana's husband.
- Rii Sen as Rangana Basu, Piku's wife.
- Indranil Mallick as Jeet Basu - Dripto's younger half-brother, Sanjukta-Tapobroto's younger son.
- Debaparna Chakraborty as Sudha.
- Rohit Mukherjee as Tarun Karmakar, Sudha's father and police inspector who loves Trinayani like a daughter.
- Neil Chatterjee as Jayanta- Jasmine's Elder Brother, Sudha's Husband.
- Nandini Chatterjee as Durba- Topobroto's younger sister, Dripto's paternal aunt.
- Ratna Ghoshal as Suhasini Lahiri.
- Abhijit Guha as Aniruddha Lahiri - Suhasini's first son, Korok and Koli's father.
- Arindam Chatterjee as Aniket Lahiri - Suhasini's second son.
- Dwaipayan Das as Anil Lahiri - Suhasini's younger son.
- Sanmitra Bhaumik as Korok Lahiri-Suhasini's Grandson, Aniruddha's son, Koli's brother.
- Deerghoi Paul as Koli Lahiri-Suhasini's Granddaughter, Aniruddha's daughter, Korok's sister.
