= Tollywood Focus =

- Poster of Tollywood Focus
- Directed by: Manas Basu
- Written by: Kaushik Pal (dialogue)
- Story by: Manas Basu
- Produced by: Koushik Ghosh
- Starring: Amitava Bhattacharya; Swastika Mukherjee
- Cinematography: Manosh Ganguly
- Music by: Deb Chowdhury
- Distributed by: Pushpa Cine Arts
- Release date: 4 April 2008
- Running time: 2 h 20 min
- Country: India
- Language: Bengali
- Budget: ₹33 lakh

Tollywood Focus is a 2008 Indian Bengali film directed by Manas Basu and starring Amitava Bhattacharya and Swastika Mukherjee.

== Plot ==
It is another peek at what goes on behind the glitz and glamour of Tollywood. Swastika plays an actress in a live-in relationship with her director Anirban Choudhury (Amitabha). But the mysterious death of Swastika's husband keeps haunting her. Satyabrato a man from Hedua (North Calcutta) started nourishing a dream. His father got astonished hearing such a dream from a lower-middle-class family chap. People of their class dream to be a Cost Accountant or sometimes even to be a Pilot but become a B.D.O. (Block Development Officer) at the end. But this man have gone mad. He wants to be a hero, and in cinemas. Yes Cinemas, that's the most horrid part. If it was serial then there would have been a chance because they need people as because they are never ending. But Satyabrato stood apart. He started exercising physically and mentally.

After many days he got in touch with a renowned director, a master craftsman regarding making Thrillers and Murder mysteries- Anirban Choudhury- Everything was going, OK for Satyabrato except his girlfriend Ananya who was not at all ready to hear all of this and wanted him to give the SSC exams if he was at all ready to leave his present job. Glitter and glam was a part of life for Ananya. She loved and cherished these as she cherished looks of guys who wanted to be close to her. God gave her all these to hide her past life where she had a torrid experience with a man she loved. Though the man have passed, a scar remained in the minds of the NO 1 heroin. Her beloved husband was a talented director, who had even received a national award at a very young age. But suddenly Anirban came in the life of Ananya. Anirban a very shrude fellow, became very close to Ananya and slowly but surely webbed the heroin with his cunning brain. He poisoned her and insisted Ananya to kill Dipankar... Ananya liked Satyabrato for his innocence. A softness grew up and one fine evening, a bit drunk with nostalgia she disclosed the hidden truth to Satyabrato. And Satyabrato came out to be the one, nobody thought of. A reporter of a reputed News Channel, with a hidden camera.

== Cast ==
- Swastika Mukherjee as the actress
- Amitabha Bhattacharya as Anirban Choudhury, the film director
- Anirban Das as Satyabrato, an actor
- Sayantani Guhathakurta as Ananya, Satyabrato's girlfriend

== Production ==
In October 2007, Amitabh Bhattacharjee worked on this film alongside his other commitments including Juti (unreleased), Sedin Dujone (2008), Rangamati (2008), Ami, Yasin Ar Amar Madhubala (2009). The film was shot in different places in Calcutta.

== Box office ==
The film was a box office failure, which was attributed to lack of hype and a proper release by the distributor, Pushpa Cine Arts.
