= Rakhi Bandhan =

Indian television series

- Bengali: রাখি বন্ধন
- Genre: Drama
- Created by: Blues Productions
- Written by: Snehasish Chakroborty
- Directed by: Bidyut Saha
- Starring: Shrabani Bhunia; Subhrojit Saha
- Theme music composer: Arup Ghosh
- Opening theme: "Rakhi Bandhan" by Joy and Trisha
- Composer: Snehasish Chakraborty
- Country of origin: India
- Original language: Bengali
- No. of episodes: 787

Production
- Producer: Snehasish Chakroborty
- Production location: Kolkata
- Running time: 22 minutes
- Production company: Blues Productions

Original release
- Network: Star Jalsha
- Release: 28 November 2016 – 3 February 2019

Rakhi Bandhan (Bengali: রাখি বন্ধন) is a Bengali television soap opera that premiered on 28 November 2016 and aired on Star Jalsha. Sayanta Modak, Sraboni Bhunia, and Subhrojit Saha play the lead roles. The show was dubbed in Tamil as Minmini Pookal, airing on Vijay Super. The show revolved round the unique bonding between the young actors Krittika and Soham, who played Rakhi and Bandhan respectively. Krittika was applauded for her comic timing, dialogue delivery and expressions. The show took a leap of 12 years in September 2018 and the young actors were replaced by Subhrajit and Srabani as Bandhan and Rakhi respectively. The show was produced by Blues Productions. The show went off air on 3 February after airing 787 episodes and was replaced by Mahapeeth Tarapeeth.

== Series overview ==
Bandhan and Rakhi are orphans. Neglected by their relatives, they are each other's support system. But when fate threatens to tear them apart, they must overcome all the hurdles.

== Plot summary ==
Rakhi Bandhan is the story of a brother and a sister who lost their parents at tender age. They are neglected by their aunt who makes them do all the household chores. Bandhan takes an oath to bring Rakhi up as a good person and send her to school and fulfil all her dreams. The story revolves around Bandhan and Rakhi's relationship.

=== 12 years' leap ===
Of late, the show has taken a leap as we find Rakhi and Bandhan all grown up, an estrangement threatens to rip them apart. Bandhan still continues to try to bring his sister back under his care from where she'd left, driven by circumstances. Bandhan is determined to mend a straining relationship with his sister and the interpersonal relationship between two siblings still forms the core of the show.

== Cast ==
- Shrabani Bhunia as Rakhi Ray (née Chatterjee) (Bandhan's younger sister, Kumaresh and Uttara's daughter, Mantasha's adoptive daughter, Ved's wife)
  - Krittika Chakraborty as Child Rakhi/Ghetu
- Subhrojit Saha as Bandhan Chatterjee (Rakhi's elder brother, Kumaresh and Uttara's son, Raunak and Chara's adoptive son, Tonni's Husband)
  - Soham Basu Roy Chowdhury as Child Bandhan
- Sayanta Modak as Ved Ray (Rakhi's husband, Isha, Disha, Loton's cousin)
- Titas Sanyal as Tonni Chatterjee (née Sengupta) (Bandhan's Wife, Rakhi's Childhood Friend)
  - Unknown as Child Tonni
- Rita Koiral / Chaitali Chakraborty as Malina Chatterjee (Bandhan and Rakhi's elder paternal aunt, Amaresh's wife, Bachchu and Mimi's mother)
- Subhasish Mukherjee as Amaresh Chatterjee (Bandhan's and Rakhi's elder paternal uncle, Kumaresh's elder brother, Bachchu and Mimi's father, Disha's father in law, Malina's husband) (Deceased)
- Kaushik Das as Bachchu Chatterjee (Amaresh and Malina's son, Disha's husband, Mimi's elder brother, Rakhi and Bandhan's cousin)
  - Unknown as Child Bachchu
- Unknown as Bachchu's wife
- Unknown as Mimi Chatterjee (Amaresh and Malina's daughter, Bachchu's younger sister, Rakhi and Bandhan's cousin)
  - Renesa Dutta as Child Mimi
- Anirban Ghosh as Late Kumaresh Chatterjee (Bandhan and Rakhi's late father, Sathi's Late Husband, Amaresh's younger brother, Tonni and Ved's late father-in-law)
- Piyali Basu as
  - Sathi Chatterjee (Rakhi and Bandhan's mother, Kumaresh's wife, Tonni and Ved's mother-in-law)
  - Uttara Sinha (Rakhi and Bandhan's maternal aunt, Sathi and Sanjay's sister, Sathi's lookalike)
- Kushal Chakraborty as Sabyasachi Sengupta, a lawyer, Tonni's father, Bandhan's father in law
- Mitali Chakraborty as Deepa Sengupta, (Sabyasachi's wife, Tonni's mother, Bandhan's mother in law)
- Aditi Chatterjee as Rikhiya Moitra, Sukalyan's wife, Taan's mother, principal of New Hollyhock School
- Rana Mitra as Sukalyan, Rikhiya's husband
- Subrata Mitra as Police Officer Panda aka Police Kaku
- Amitabha Bhattacharyya as Doctor Babu
- Pradip Dhar as Madan aka Madna (Malina, Minoti's younger brother & Pramod's elder brother, Bhebli, Bachchu and Mimi's maternal uncle)
- Sudipa Basu / Unknown as Minoti, (Malina, Madan & Pramod's elder sister, Bhebli's mother, Bachchu and Mimi's maternal aunt)
- Raju Majumder as Pramod (Malina, Minoti & Madan's younger brother, Bhebli, Bachchu & Mimi's maternal uncle)
- Unknown as Bhebli (Minoti's daughter, Malina, Madan & Pramod's niece, Bachchu & Mimi's cousin)
- Unknown as Bhebli's husband
- Siddhartha Banerjee as Sanjay Sinha (Uttara and Sathi's elder brother, Rakhi and Bandhan's maternal uncle, Damayanti's Husband)
- Arpita Dutta Chowdhury as Damayanti Sinha (Sanjay's Wife, Rakhi and Bandhan's Maternal aunt)
- Debjani Chattopadhyay as Anamika Banerjee, Shuddho Dev's Wife, Raunak's elder sister
- Jayanta Dutta Barman as Shuddho Dev Banerjee, Anamika's Husband
- Swarnakamal Dutta as Mantasha Banerjee, Rakhi's Adoptive Mother, Reet's Wife, Sanjay, Uttara and Sathi's Cousin
- Sayantani Majumder as Moon
- Chandraniv Mukherjee as Reet Banerjee, Satyadev's elder son, Dil's elder brother, Mantasha's husband
- Rumpa Das as Tikli Banerjee, Dil's Wife
- Gaurav Ghoshal as Dil Banerjee, Satyadev's younger son, Reet's younger brother, Tikli's husband
- Moumita Chakraborty as Jagatjanani
- Saikat Das as Tiyash (Uttara's former love interest)
- Vikramjit Chaudhury as Riju Mukherjee, Raunak's younger brother, Deepika's Husband
- Boni Mukherjee as Deepika Mukherjee, Riju's Wife
- Rupsha Guha as Rahi
- Kanchana Maitra as Sohag
- Gautam De as Satyadev Banerjee, Reet and Dil's father, Mantasha and Tikli's father in law
- Soma Banerjee as Satyadev's Wife, Reet and Dil's mother, Mantasha and Tikli's mother in law
- Indrakshi Nag as Isha (Disha and Loton's elder sister, Ved's cousin)
- Manoj Ojha as Raunak Mukherjee, a boxer, Bandhan's adoptive father, Anamika's younger brother
- Rupsha Chakraborty as Chara Mukherjee, Bandhan's adoptive mother
- Moumita Gupta as Chanda Ganguly, a marriage registrar, Chara's Mother
- Indrani Chatterjee as Champa Chameli Das
- Unknown as Kalu
- Unknown as Bappi
- Unknown as Khokon
- Unknown as Soda
- Unknown as Zingu
- Unknown as Shatter
- Unknown as Padmo
- Unknown as Lotte
- Unknown as Binoti aka Ranga
- Unknown as Bhola
- Unknown as Ram Singh
- Aloke Chatterjee
- Biplab Dasgupta
- Chhanda Chatterjee
- Shankar Debnath as Malina's lawyer
- Sanjib Sarkar as Ghanshyam Baroi, Sanjay Sinha's lawyer
- Raja Chatterjee as Nikhil Nandi, a local mafia, Isha, Loton and Disha's paternal uncle, Ved's maternal uncle
- Sourav Sengupta as Loton Gupta, a boxer, Bandhan's rival (Isha and Disha's brother, Ved's cousin)
