= Titas Bhowmik =

Indian actress

- Born: Kolkata, West Bengal, India
- Occupations: Actress and model
- Years active: 2011 - present
- Known for: Tomay Amay Mile
- Spouse(s): Samadarshi Dutta (m. 2014 - div. 2018); Snehasish Das (m. 2022)
- Children: 1

Titas Bhowmik is an Indian actress who is known for playing the role of Kakoli in the Bengali television serial Tomay Amay Mile, and for appearing in the 2011 film Paglu. To commemorate Shakespeare's birthday, she participated in an event where she performed a scene from Taming of the Shrew in Kolkata.

Bhowmik was married to film actor Samadarshi Dutta from 2014 to 2018. In 2013, she participated in the reality show Bigg Boss Bangla 13.

== Filmography ==
=== Television ===
Year	Title	Role
2014	Taarey Ami Chokhey Dekhini	
2012-	Ghore Pherar Gaan	Rayna
2012	Checkmate	Rojoni
2013-2016	Tomay Amay Mile	Kakoli Ghosh
2016	Dugga Dugga	
2017–2018	Sanyashi Raja	Rani Kshonoprobha Rai
2017	Mahaprabhu Shree Chaitanya	Nimai's Mother
2018–2020	Joy Baba Loknath	Sudha
2019	Meera	
2020-2021	Kora Pakhi	Medha Sinha

=== Film ===
- Kadambari 2015
- Paglu 2011
