= Rimjhim Gupta =

Indian actress

- Born: Rimjhim Gupta; Kolkata, West Bengal, India
- Occupations: Actress; Model
- Years active: 2003–present
- Parent: Moumita Gupta

Rimjhim Gupta is an Indian actress and model who appears in Bengali cinema. She is the daughter of actress Moumita Gupta.

== Career ==
Rimjhim Gupta made her debut in the Bengali film Raasta (2003). She then went on to work in numerous Bengali films such as Pita (2006), Hatey Roilo Pistol (2011), Bedeni (2011), Holud Pakhir Dana (2013) and Kaal Madhumas (2013). She later appeared in the Bengali television series Roilo Pherar Nimontron (2011) and Jiyon Kathi (2014). She then played a role in the Zee Bangla television series Uma (2021).

== Filmography ==
Year	Film	Role	Notes	Ref
2003	Raasta		Debut	
2003	Bhalo Theko			
2004	Barood	Basak's younger sister		
2004	Akritagya			
2004	Raja Babu			
2005	Til Theke Tal			
2005	Tobu Bhalobasi			
2006	Pita			
2006	Swarthopar			
2006	Bhumiputra			
2007	Ratbhor			
2008	Tumi Kar	Chandra Roy		
2009	Maati -O- Manush			
2009	Houseful	Nandita		
2009	Siddhanta			
2009	Chorabali			
2010	Mahanagari			
2011	Bedeni	Jhumri		
2011	Hatey Roilo Pistol			
2011	Kagojer Bou	Shreya		
2011	Anterdaho			
2011	Rong Berong	Aritri		
2013	Holud Pakhir Dana	Saheli Mitra		
2013	Kaal Madhumas	Swati		
2013	Chora Bali			
2015	Maya			
2017	Adhunik			
2023	Ajana Nesha			

== Television ==
Year	Series	Role	Channels	Ref
2010	Roilo Pherar Nimontron		Star Jalsha	
2019– 2021	Jiyon Kathi	Rai Chatterjee	Sun Bangla	
2021	Sundari	Sandya Mitra	Sun Bangla	
2021– 2022	Uma	Swastika Chakrabarty (née Acharya) aka Piu	Zee Bangla	
2022	Alor Theekana	Sabitri	Sun Bangla	
2024	Kajol Nodir Jole	Arjun's aunt	Zee Bangla	
