= Aparajita Apu =

Indian Bengali television series

- Genre: Drama; Romance
- Written by: Dialogues; Arpita Pal
- Screenplay by: Rupa Banerjee
- Story by: Susanta Das; Sayantani Bhattacharya
- Directed by: Swapan Kumar Nandi
- Creative directors: Susanta Das; Sayantani Bhattacharya
- Starring: Susmita Dey; Rohaan Bhattacharjee; Satabdi Nag; Soma Banerjee; Surojit Bandopadhyay; Nandini Chattrejee; Sanjib Sarkar
- Theme music composer: Suvam Moitra
- Country of origin: India
- Original language: Bengali
- No. of episodes: 418

Production
- Executive producers: Soheli Goswami (Tent Cinema); Priyanka Seth; Aniruddha Ghosh (Zee Bangla)
- Producer: Susanta Das
- Production location: Kolkata
- Cinematography: Subrata Mallick
- Editor: Amitava Bagchi
- Camera setup: Multi-camera
- Running time: 22 minutes
- Production company: Tent Cinema

Original release
- Network: Zee Bangla
- Release: 30 November 2020 – 26 March 2022

Aparajita Apu is an Indian Bengali television drama which is broadcasting on Bengali general entertainment channel Zee Bangla and is also available on the digital platform ZEE5. It was premiered on 30 November 2020 and produced by Susanta Das under the banner of Tent Cinema. The series stars Susmita Dey and Rohaan Bhattacharjee.

== Plot ==
Apu is a young and passionate girl. She aspires to achieve her dream and become a successful government officer (B.D.O.) in order to help her father and break all stereotypes. However, Apu's elder sister Supu was going to marry Abala's third son. But in Abala Mukherjee's family, Juthika was ready to stop the marriage and demand dowry. Apu learns it and threatens to call the police. So Juthika fears and the marriage ends well. Soon Apu and Abola's last son Dipu falls in love with each other and later due to some unfortunate circumstances they both get married. Apu faces challenges in the form of her conservative mother-in-law, Abala. But Dipu supports and helps her to achieve and fulfill the dreams.

== Cast ==
=== Main ===
- Susmita Dey as Aparna Mukherjee (née Chakravarty) aka Apu: A passionate and brave woman, a B.D.O of Phulbari, Dipu's wife
- Rohaan Bhattacharjee as Dipyaman Mukherjee aka Dipu: A calm and disciplined man, Apu's husband

=== Recurring ===
- Satabdi Nag as Suparna Mukherjee (née Chakravarty) aka Supu: Apu's elder sister, Dwaipayan's wife and Abala's third daughter-in-law.
- Sanjib Sarkar as Subir Chakravarty : Apu, Supu, Surya and Robi's father; Dwaipayan and Dipu's father in law.
- Jayaati Chakraborty as Paroma Chakravarty: Apu, Supu, Surya and Robi's mother; Dwaipayan and Dipu's mother in law.
- Soma Banerjee as Abala Mukherjee: Arindam, Samarpan, Dwaipayan, Dipu and Khuku's mother; Tithi, Diksha, Supu and Apu's mother-in-law, Anadi's wife.
- Surojit Banerjee as Anadi Mukherjee: Arindam, Samarpan, Dwaipayan, Dipu and Khuku's father; Tithi, Diksha, Supu and Apu's father-in-law, Abala's husband.
- Nandini Chatterjee as Juthika Banerjee: Abala's younger sister and Arindam, Samarpan, Dwaipayan, Dipu and Khuku's aunt.
- Indrajit Mazumder as Arindam Mukherjee: Samarpan, Dwaipayan, Dipu, Khuku's eldest brother, Tithi's husband and Abala's first son.
- Sumana Chakraborty as Tithi Mukherjee: Samarpan, Dwaipayan, Dipu and Khuku's eldest sister-in-law and Abala's first daughter-in-law.
- Atmadeep Ghosh / Aritra Dutta as Samarpan Mukherjee: Arindam's younger brother; Dwaipayan, Dipu and Khuku's second eldest brother, Diksha's husband, Abala's second son.
- Susmita Roy Chakraborty as Diksha Mukherjee : Dwaipayan, Dipu and Khuku's second eldest sister-in-law and Abala's second daughter-in-law.
- Sankar Malakar as Dwaipayan Mukherjee : Dipu's third eldest brother, Supu's husband and Abala's third son.
- Sonalisa Das / Soumi Banerjee as Megha Mukherjee : Dipu's cousin sister.
- Mouli Dutta as Barsha Mukherjee : Dipu's cousin sister.
- Debopriya Basu as Khuku : Dipu's deceased sister.
- Ranjini Chattopadhyay as Manisha Mukherjee : Dipu's aunt and Megha and Borsa's mother, Chanchal's wife.
- Saibal Bhattacharya as Chanchal Mukherjee : Dipu's uncle and Megha and Borsa's father, Manisha's husband.
- Aritram Mukherjee as Surja Chakravarty : Apu and Supu's eldest brother.
- Debopriyo Mitra as Robi Chakravarty : Apu and Supu's second eldest brother.
- Monalisa Das as Monalisa Dutta : Dipu's ex-fiancée.
- Nilotpal Banerjee as Nilotpal Banerjee aka Neelu : Juthika's son.
- Ashmita Baidya as Munmun: Dwaipayan's lover
- Partha Sarathi Deb as Gurudev.
- Chandraneev Mukherjee as Videsh Mondal: Khuku's killer.
- Amitabh Bhattacharjee as Professor of office, he takes Apu's interview.
- Juiee Sarkar as Anamika: Dwaipayan's fake wife.
- Priyanka Bhattacharjee as Sunaina aka Sunny / Rubina Malik: Dipu's love interest

== Awards ==
Year	Award	Category	Character
2022	Zee Bangla Sonar Sansar Award 2022	Priyo Sashuri	Abala
2022	Zee Bangla Sonar Sansar Award 2022	Priyo Bou	Apu
2022	Zee Bangla Sonar Sansar Award 2022	Priyo Bor	Dipu

== Production ==
After Krishnakoli, producer Susanta Das has started producing the series under the banner Tent Cinema. It stars Susmita Dey, a model took part in a beauty pageant, plays the titular role in the series with actor Rohaan Bhattacharjee bagged in the lead roles.

== Reception ==
=== Ratings ===
Week	Year	BARC Viewership		Ref.
Week	Year	TRP	Rank	Ref.
Week 9	2021	4.6	5	
Week 10	2021	4.3	4	
Week 11	2021	4.4	4	
Week 12	2021	4.7	4	
Week 13	2021	4.8	3	
Week 14	2021	5.4	2	
Week 15	2021	5.0	3	
Week 16	2021	4.6	2	
Week 17	2021	5.2	2	
Week 18	2021	4.8	2	
Week 19	2021	5.8	2	
Week 20	2021	5.6	2	
Week 22	2021	4.4	2	

== Adaptations ==
Language	Title	Original release	Network(s)	Last aired	Notes
Bengali	Aparajita Apu অপরাজিতা অপু	30 November 2020	Zee Bangla	26 March 2022	Original
Tamil	Indira இந்திரா	21 November 2022	Zee Tamil	17 August 2024	Remake
