= Bangla Medium =

2022 Indian Bengali TV series

- Genre: Drama
- Written by: Susanta Das; Sayantani Bhattacharya
- Story by: Sayantani Bhattacharya; Susanta Das
- Starring: Tiyasha Lepcha; Neel Bhattacharya; Sampurna Lahiri
- Opening theme: "Gorbo Kori!... Bangla Medium"
- Country of origin: India
- Original language: Bengali
- No. of episodes: 325

Production
- Executive producers: Rashmi Roy; Shubhojit Singh
- Producer: Susanta Das
- Production location: Kolkata
- Cinematography: Partiosh Singh
- Editor: Shubit
- Running time: 22 minutes
- Production company: Tent Cinema

Original release
- Network: Star Jalsha
- Release: 12 December 2022 – 2 November 2023

Bangla Medium is an Indian Bengali language drama television series which premiered from 12 December 2022 on Star Jalsha and also digitally available on JioHotstar. It stars Tiyasha Lepcha, Neel Bhattacharya and Sampurna Lahiri as the leads.

== Plot ==
Indira strives to create an atmosphere of schooling without bribery and illegal disputes. On her path, she meets Bikram, who is owns an English medium school. Once she begins teaching there in a spat of a challenge, her fate gets ties to Bikram unknowingly. The story then pursues on how Indira balances her life after a compromised marriage with Bikram, on the backdrop of schooling and hatred from her modern sister-in-law, Suhana.

== Cast ==
=== Main ===
- Tiyasha Lepcha as Indira Sarkar Chatterjee – A Bangla-medium graduate and Principal of Future Dreamz School; Vikram's wife (2022–2023)
- Neel Bhattacharya as Debjit "Vikram" Chatterjee – Director of Future Dreamz School; Dighu and Nibetida's son; Ananya's step-son; Sohana's brother; Arko's half-brother; Baban's step-brother; Sayan, Dalia, Rehan and Tiyash's cousin;Amrita's ex-boyfriend, Krish's (Amrita and Vicky' son) father; Pamela's ex-fiancé; Indira's husband. (2022–2023)
- Sampurna Lahiri / Misty Singh as Sohana Chatterjee Das – Dighu and Nibetida's daughter; Ananya's step-daughter; Vikram's sister; Arko's half-sister; Baban's step-sister; Sayan, Dalia, Rehan and Tiyash's cousin; Rajdeep's wife; Indira's former rival (2022–2023) / (2023)

=== Recurring ===
- Raja Goswami as Rajdeep Das – Auto driver; Sumana and Rajendra's younger son; Suresh's brother; Sohana's husband (2023)
- Arindam Banerjee as Diganta "Dighu" Chatterjee – Basanti's eldest son; Sumonto and Bibhas's brother; Nibedita's husband; Ananya's husband; Vikram, Sohana and Arko's father; Baban's step-father. (2022–2023)
- Swagata Mukherjee as Ananya Chatterjee – Dighu's second wife; Baban and Arko's mother; Sohana and Vikram's step-mother. (2022–2023)
- Nibedita Mukherjee as Nibedita Chatterjee – Dighu's wife; Sohana and Vikram's mother. (2023)
- Ratna Ghoshal as Basanti Chatterjee – Dighu, Sumonto and Bibhas's mother; Sohana, Vikram, Arko, Sayan, Dalia, Rehan and Tiyash's grandmother; Baban's step-grandmother. (2022–2023)
- Avrajit Chakraborty as Sumonto Chatterjee – Future Dreamz School employee; Basanti's second son; Dighu and Bibhas's brother; Sayan and Dalia's single father. (2022–2023)
- Arnab Banerjee as Bibhas Chatterjee – Future Dreamz School employee; Basanti's youngest son; Dighu and Sumonto's brother; Subarna's husband; Rehan and Tiyash's father. (2022–2023)
- Payel Dutta as Subarna Chatterjee – Housewife; Bibhas's wife; Rehan and Tiyash's mother. (2022–2023)
- Reshma Mondal as Dalia Chatterjee – College student; Sumonto's daughter; Sayan's sister; Sohana, Vikram, Arko, Rehan and Tiyash's cousin; Baban's step-cousin. (2022–2023)
- Sourya Bhattacharya as Sayan Chatterjee – Future Dreamz School employee; Sumonto's son; Dalia's brother; Sohana, Vikram, Arko, Rehan and Tiyash's cousin; Baban's step-cousin; Abira's husband. (2022–2023)
- Priyanjali Das as Abira Chatterjee – Housewife; Sayan's wife. (2022–2023)
- Ayaan Ghosh as Arko Chatterjee – A photographer; Dighu and Ananya's son; Baban, Sohana and Vikram's half-brother; Sayan, Dalia, Rehan and Tiyash's brother. (2022–2023)
- Vivaan Ghosh as Baban – Ananya's son; Dighu's step-son; Arko's half-brother; Sohana and Vikram's step-brother; Sayan, Dalia, Rehan and Tiyash's step-cousin. (2023)
- Ayush Das as Rehan Chatterjee – Future Dreamz School student; Bibhas and Subarna's elder son; Tiyash's brother; Sohana, Vikram, Arko, Sayan and Dalia's cousin; Baban's step-cousin. (2022–2023)
- Kuyasha Biswas as Pamela – Vikram's ex-fiancé. (2022–2023)
- Manishankar Banerjee as Indira's deceased father. (2022)
- Nabonita Dey as Indira's aunt. (2022–2023)
- Sanjoy Basu as Indira's uncle. (2022–2023)
- Rii Sen as Mohona Basu – English teacher of Future Dreamz School. (2023)
- Purbasha Roy as Mehuli – Social science teacher of Future Dreamz School. (2022–2023)
- Srishtipriya Das as Roshni – Math teacher of Future Dreamz School. (2022)
- Joy Badlani as Mr. Ajitabha Sinha – An industrialist. (2022)
- Pranabhi Bose as Mrs. Chatterjee – Science Teacher of Future Dreamz School. (2022)
- Ranjini Chattopadhyay as Sumana Das – Rajendra's wife; Suresh and Rajdeep's mother. (2023)
- Ashok Mukherjee as Rajendra Prasad Das – Sumana's husband; Suresh and Rajdeep's father. (2023)
- Anirban Ghosh as Suresh Das – Sumana and Rajendra's elder son; Rajdeep's brother; Shiuli's husband. (2023)
- Avery Singha Roy as Shiuli Das – Suresh's wife. (2023)
- Debomoy Mukherjee as Dinesh – Indira's college classmate. (2023)
- Debarati Paul as Arshiya – Student of Future Dreamz School. (2023)
- Jina Tarafder as Elina – Insane student of Future Dreamz School. (2023)
- Saoli Chattopadhyay as Binodini (2023)
- Sairity Banerjee as Amrita - Vikram's ex-girlfriend, Krish's mother. (2023)

== Adaptations ==
Language	Title	Original release	Network(s)	Last aired	Notes
Bengali	Bangla Medium বাংলা মিডিয়াম	12 December 2022	Star Jalsha	2 November 2023	Original
Telugu	Yadaloyallo Indradanassu యడలోయల్లో ఇంద్రదనస్సు	24 April 2023	Star Maa	17 February 2024	Remake
Kannada	Kaveri Kannada Medium ಕಾವೇರಿ ಕನ್ನಡ ಮಾಧ್ಯಮ	28 August 2023	Star Suvarna	2 March 2025	Remake
Marathi	Marathi Medium मराठी मिडियम	12 October 2026	Star Pravah	Ongoing	Remake
