= Amitabh Bhattacharjee =

Indian actor (born 1983)

- Born: 15 August 1973 (age 53); New Delhi, India
- Other name: Papai
- Occupation: Actor
- Spouses: Sukanya Bhattacharjee (m. 2014)

Amitabh Bhattacharjee (born 15 August 1973) is an Indian actor who works in Bengali and Hindi films. He was born and brought up in Delhi. His Bengali debut film was Rasta, directed by Bratya Basu, with Mithun Chakraborty. He has done many Bengali films & Hindi films as well. Apart from this, he was seen in a Bengali show named Checkmate and currently he portrays the character of Dr. Subhankar Banerjee, the male protagonist of Bikele Bhorer Phool.

== Filmography ==
=== Hindi ===
- The Legend of Bhagat Singh (2002)
- Saanjh (2004)
- Kalyug (2005)

=== Bengali ===
- Rasta 2003
- Swapne Dekha Rajkanya 2004
- Shakti 2004
- Akritagno 2004
- Shikar 2006
- Je Jon Thake Majhkhane 2006
- Abhinetri 2006
- Tulkalam 2007
- Shudhu Tomar Jonyo 2007
- Juti (unreleased) 2008
- Tumi Kar 2008
- Tollywood Focus 2008
- Sedin Dujone 2008
- Rangamati 2008
- Hello Kolkata 2008
- Jhar Sheshe (unreleased) 2008
- Eka Eka (unreleased) 2008
- Baghini Kanya (unreleased) 2008
- Ami, Yasin Ar Amar Madhubala 2008
- Risk 2009
- Murder 2011
- Kolkata The Metro Life 2011
- Jibone Prem Ekbar Ashe 2013
- Bindaas 2014
- Prem Juddho 2015
- Game Plan (2016 film)|Game Plan 2016
- Kanamachi Bho Bho 2016
- Raktokarobi 2017
- Ekdin Ratre 2018
- Raghav 2018
- Chobiyal 2020

== Television ==
Year	Serial	Character	Channel
2012	Checkmate	Aditya Sen	Star Jalsha
2017	Bikele Bhorer Phool	Dr. Subhankar Banerjee	Zee Bangla
2019	Mahatirtha Kalighat	Sadhak Atmaram	Sun Bangla
2020–2022	Ke Apon Ke Por	Robin Roy	Star Jalsha
2021	Uma	Himadri Acharya	Zee Bangla
2021	Aparajita Apu	Professor	Zee Bangla
2022	Aalta Phoring	Nirmal Naskar	Star Jalsha
2023– 2024	Tomader Rani	Bishwajit Debroy	Star Jalsha
2024	Bodhua		Star Jalsha
2024–2025	Dui Shalik	Priyo Ranjan Kanjilal aka PRK; Gaurav and Deva's father	Star Jalsha
2025–2026	Rajrajeshwari Rani Bhabani	Ramjibon Moitra; Ramkanta's Father	Star Jalsha
2026–Present	Dulari	Chandranath Sinha; Dulari and Anusha's Father	Zee Bangla
