= Indira (TV series) =

2023 Indian Tamil TV series

- Genre: Drama; Romance
- Written by: Marimuthu; Mithra Azhaguvel; Savitha
- Screenplay by: Marimuthu
- Directed by: Rajiv K. Prasath; A. Manjunathan
- Starring: Fouziee; Akshay Kamal
- Music by: Suganth Jo; Rakshith. K; Pavithran. S
- Country of origin: India
- Original language: Tamil
- No. of episodes: 536

Production
- Producer: Aran Hari
- Editors: Girivasishtar; Mathi YID
- Camera setup: Multi-camera
- Running time: 22 minutes
- Production company: Spectraa Productions

Original release
- Network: Zee Tamil
- Release: 21 November 2022 – 17 August 2024

Indira is a 2022-2024 Indian Tamil-language television drama. It is based on Bengali-language drama series Aparajita Apu aired on Zee Bangla. It aired on Zee Tamil from 21 November 2022 to 17 August 2024. The show premiered along with 'Kanaa' and produced by Aran Hari under the banner of Spectraa Productions.

== Synopsis ==
Indira and Kavya are two sisters, coming from a small-town middle-class family. She aspires to achieve her dream and become a successful IAS officer. However, Indira's elder sister Kavya was married Jayalakshmi 's third son Kathir. But Jayalakshmi and Indra fight over marriage and demand dowry. Indira learns it and threatens to call the police. So they become enemies.

Soon Indra and Jayalakshmi's last son Gowtham fell in love with each other but were separated due to a misunderstanding. Indira learns that her sister's husband Kathir is having an affair with another woman. To help his sister later due to some unfortunate circumstances they marry.

Indira faces challenges in the form of her conservative mother-in-law, Jayalakshmi and her sister's Ragini. But his husband Gowtham supports and helps her to achieve and fulfill the dreams.

== Cast ==
=== Main ===
- Fouziee as Indira
  - Gowtham's wife; Youngest daughter-in-law of Jaya and Rama Chandran; Kavya's younger sister; Subramani and Chitra's youngest daughter. She is young and passionate and aspires to achieve her dream and become a IAS officer.
- Akshay Kamal (2022-2024) as Gowtham
  - Indira's husband; Youngest son of Jaya and Rama Chandran. A calm, straightforward and disciplined man

=== Recurring ===
- Jeevi Dimple (2022-2024) → Dhachayani (2024) as Kavya: Third daughter-in-law of Jaya and Rama Chandran; Indira's elder sister; Kathir's wife
- Premi Venkat as Jayalakshmi (Jaya): mother of four sons includes Kathir and Gowtham; Hema, Subha, Kavya and Indira's mother-in-law
- David Solomon Raja as Rama Chandran: Jaya's husband; father of four sons includes Kathir and Gowtham; Hema, Subha, Kavya and Indira's father-in-law
- Merwen Balaji as Kathir: Third son of Jaya and Rama Chandran; Kavya's husband
- Akhila Krishnan as Raagini: Jaya's younger sister and she is against of Indira and Kavya (Main Antagonist)
- Archana as Subha: Second daughter-in-law of Jaya and Rama Chandran
- Nathan Shyam as the second son of Jaya and Rama Chandran; Subha's husband
- Durga / Navya Suji as Hema: First daughter-in-law of Jaya and Rama Chandran
- Bala as First son of Jaya and Rama Chandran; Hema's husband
- Som Soumyan as Subramani: Kavya and Indira's father
- Premalatha as Chitra: Kavya and Indira's mother; Subramani's wife

=== Cameo ===
- Nalini as Chinnaponnu: Subramani's elder sister

== Production ==
=== Casting ===
Fouziee, supporting actress in television who made her role as the female lead for the first time in Tamil television industry. Akshay Kamal was cast as the male lead again in Zee Tamil after Rettai Roja. Premi Venkat being cast to play Akshay's mother, where Jeevi Dimple was cast to play Fouzhiee's sister.

=== Release ===
The first promo was released on 25 October featuring with short narration of the series with a bit tittle song around 2 minutes.

== Adaptations ==
Language	Title	Original release	Network(s)	Last aired	Notes
Bengali	Aparajita Apu অপরাজিতা অপু	30 November 2020	Zee Bangla	26 March 2022	Original
Tamil	Indira இந்திரா	21 November 2022	Zee Tamil	Ongoing	Remake
