= Subhrojit Saha =

Indian television actor

- Occupation: Actor
- Years active: 2016–present
- Spouse: Priyanka Mitra

Subhrojit Saha is an Indian television actor mainly working in the Bengali-language television industry based in Kolkata. He came to prominence by playing the male lead role in the television serial Rakhi Bandhan.

== Career ==
Saha started his acting career with television serial Rakhi Bandhan in which he played the role of Bandhan. After the show went off-air, he was cast to play Jadunath Choudhury, the grandson of Rani Rashmoni in Karunamoyee Rani Rashmoni from 2019 to 2020. He is currently playing Samudra, the male lead in Nayantara.

Year	Show	Character	Role	Channel	Notes	Ref
2016	Rakhi Bandhan	Bandhan	Lead Role	Star Jalsha		
2019-2020	Karunamoyee Rani Rashmoni	Jadunath Choudhury	Side Role	Zee Bangla		
2021–2023	Nayantara	Samudra	Lead Role	Sun Bangla		
2024	Constable Manju	Arjun	Lead Role	Sun Bangla		
2025	Geeta LL.B	Ankit Chatterjee	Side Role	Star Jalsha	Later Replaced by Sayan Karmakar	
2026	Shudhu Tomari Jonyo	Rahul Roy Chowdhury	Lead Role	Star Jalsha	Later Replaced by Sayan Bose	
