= Stree (TV series) =

Indian Bengali language television series

- Genre: Drama; Romance; Masala; Revenge; Thriller
- Created by: Blues Productions
- Written by: Snehasish Chakraborty
- Directed by: Bijoy Maji
- Starring: Neel Bhattacharya; Neha Amandeep; Moumita Gupta; Goutam De(deceased); Rita Koiral(deceased)
- Voices of: Trisha Parui
- Opening theme: Sinthee te sindoor rangalei hoina to keu stree
- Composer: Snehasish Chakraborty
- Country of origin: India
- Original language: Bengali
- No. of seasons: 1
- No. of episodes: 409

Production
- Producer: Snehasish Chakraborty
- Production location: Kolkata
- Running time: 22 minutes
- Production company: Blues Productions

Original release
- Network: Zee Bangla
- Release: 26 December 2016 – 11 February 2018

Related
- Goyenda Ginni

Stree is a Bengali television soap opera Masala series that premiered on 26 December 2016, and aired on Zee Bangla. It was produced by Snehasish Chakraborty and starred Neha Amandeep and Neel Bhattacharya in lead roles, and Goutam De, Rita Koiral and Dolon Roy in supporting roles. It also starred Moumita Gupta in an antagonistic role. It replaced the popular show Goyenda Ginni. The show telecasted at Monday to Sunday at 7:30 pm. The show went off air on 11 February 2018 and was replaced by Amloki.

== Cast ==
- Neel Bhattacharya as
  - Prwithwijit Deb - Niru's husband (Main Male lead)
  - Aksar Sen - Prwithwijit in disguise.
- Neha Amandeep as Nirupama Deb (née Ghosh) aka Niru (Main female lead)
- Sanjib Sarkar as Subinoy Ghosh - Niru's father
- Rita Koiral as Sabitri Ghosh - Niru's Mother
- Moumita Gupta as Shakuntala (Former Antagonist)
- Gautam De as Indrajit Deb
- Rahul Dev Bose as Vicky Deb
- Madhurima Basak as Rima Deb
- Gourav Ghoshal as Biju Deb
- Priya Mondal as Aliya Basu (née Deb)
- Vikramjit Chowdhury as Rishi Basu
- Sananda Basak as Sonia Ghosh - Anjan's Wife
- Aditya Roy as Anjan Ghosh
- Chandraneev Mukherjee as Harshbardhan Basu aka Goba.
- Dolon Roy as Namita Basu - Goba and Rishi's mother.
- Ritu Rai Acharya as Niki Deb
- Supriyo Dutta as Sumit Basu - Goba and Rishi's Father
- Tapashi Roy Chowdhury as Rishi's Aunt
- Madhurima Paul as Torsha Basu - Rishi's wife.
- Sonali Chatterjee as
  - Neelima Deb - Prwithwijit and Sonali's mother, Indrajit's first wife. (Deceased)
  - Sonali Chakraborty - Prwithwijit's elder sister.
