= Neha Amandeep =

Indian actress

- Born: Amandeep Sonkar; 1997 or 1998 (age 27–28); Kolkata, West Bengal, India
- Occupations: Actress, Model

Amandeep Sonkar, better known as Neha Amandeep, is an Indian actress and model who primarily works in Bengali-language television and films.

== Biography ==
Neha Amandeep was born as Amandeep Sonkar. Though Amandeep is an actress, she worked as a model too. She appeared in many advertisements including the advertisements of Big Bazaar, Pran and Horlicks. Her first work in television was in Sahara One's television series Sahib Biwi Gulam. In this television series she acted as a child actress.

Amandeep's first film was Hey Prabhu Dekha De, which was released in 2016. This film was an Odia film. She made her debut in Bangla television arena with Stree in 2016. Then, she appeared in Om Namah Shivay. She also appeared in Star Jalsha's Durga Puja teledrama Durgatinashini Durga in 2018 as Devi Kaushiki.

Amandeep appeared in two television films titled Chore Chore Mastuto Bhai and Jayo Jayo Debi in 2019. She also appeared in Didi No. 1 and Thakumar Jhuli in 2019. Her first Bangladeshi film, Prem Chor was released on 6 December 2019. She worked in Sun Bangla's daily soap opera Kone Bou.

== Filmography ==
=== Television ===
Year	Show	Role	Language	Channel	Note
2004–2005	Sahib Biwi Gulam		Hindi	Sahara One	Debut television series
2016–2018	Stree	Nirupama	Bengali	Zee Bangla	Debut Bangla television series
2018	Om Namah Shivay	Devi Sati	Bengali	Star Jalsha	Mythological Series
2019	Thakumar Jhuli	Princess	Bengali	Star Jalsha	In one Story (2 Episodes)
2019–2020	Kone Bou	Mahi	Bengali	Sun Bangla	Television Series
2024	Jogomaya	Jogomaya	Bengali	Zee Bangla	Television Series

=== Film ===
Year	Film	Language	Note
2016	Hey Prabhu Dekha De	Odia	Debut film
2019	Chore Chore Mastuto Bhai	Bangla	Television film
2019	Jayo Jayo Debi	Bangla	Television film
2019	Prem Chor	Bangla	Bangladeshi film
