= Om Namah Shivay (2018 TV series) =

Indian television series

- Title Poster
- Genre: Hindu mythology
- Created by: Surinder Films
- Written by: Sayantani Bhattacharya; Rupa Banerjee; Priyanka Seth
- Directed by: Soumik Chatterjee
- Starring: See below
- Voices of: Upali and Amit
- Opening theme: Om Namah Shivay by Madhuraa Bhattacharya
- Composers: Nachiketa Chakraborty; Jeet Gannguli
- Country of origin: India
- Original language: Bengali
- No. of seasons: 2
- No. of episodes: 142

Production
- Producers: Surinder Singh; Nispal Singh
- Production location: Kolkata
- Cinematography: Paritosh Singh
- Running time: 22 minutes
- Production company: Surinder Films

Original release
- Network: STAR Jalsha
- Release: 18 June – 10 November 2018

Related
- Mayurpankhi

Om Namah Shivay is a Bengali television show that premiered on 18 June 2018 and was aired on Star Jalsha. The show went off-air on 10 November 2018.

The series explores the tale of Hindu deity Shiva's life, his infinite love for goddess Sati, his grief over her loss, his timeless union with goddess Parvati and his legend as the fearsome destroyer of evil.

Mahadev is played by Gaurav Mondal while Neha Amandeep plays Sati and Sriparna Roy portrays the character of Parvati.

== Plot ==
The story follows Shiva, the Protector and the Destroyer, the Peaceful and the Fierce. Shiva is portrayed as a family man uninfluenced by mortal allures and pleasures.

Om Namoh Shivay starts with Dakshya, the son of Brahma, being introduced as the greatest Prajapati on earth. Asur Raj (King of the Asuras) Jalandhar attacks his kingdom and starts wreaking havoc. After Dakshya's failure to stop Jalandhar, all Gods and humans start praying to Shiva, who punishes Jalandhar and saves the world. This infuriates Dakshya who denies Shiva's supremacy.

Brahma prays to Mahamaya for help to domesticate Shiva. She takes a mortal birth as Sati, daughter of Dakshya and becomes an ardent worshipper of Shiva.

Dakshay cannot tolerate Sati's dedication and decides to teach young Sati a lesson by imprisoning her. However, Shiva starts playing mridangam and magically rescues Sati. Dakshya gets further infuriated and throws out all Shiva followers from Dakshya Rajya. They are rescued by Shiva who gives them food and shelter.

Rishi Durvasa, the son of Atri and Anasuya comes to Dakshya Rajya and Sati pleases him with the help of Shiva's magic. Durvasa blesses Sati for her devotion and says that one day she would become the wife of Shiva. However, arrogant Dakshya insults Durvasa and the infuriated Rishi curses the Prajapati.

== Cast ==
- Gaurav Mondal as Lord Shiva
- Neha Amandeep as Sati, Mahavidya
- Sriparna Roy as devi Parvati, Mahamaya, Tripura Sundari, Mahakali, Annapurna, Durga
- Soumyadipta Saha as Ganesha
- Rupsha Mukherjee as Devi Lakshmi
- Arup Poddar as Kama
- Sambhabhi as Young Sati
- Sumanta Mukherjee as Dakshya
- Sabysachi Chowdhury as Lord Vishnu, Narayan
- Bipul Patra as Kartik
- Subrata Guharoy as Lord Brahma
- Swarnodipto Ghosh as Nandy
- Debomoy Mukherjee as Bhringi
