= Mon Bole Priya Priya =

2011 Indian Bengali film

- Film poster
- Directed by: Milan Bhowmik
- Produced by: Sanjay Kumar Das
- Starring: Raaj Bhowmik; Pamela; Tapas Paul; Ashish Vidyarthi; Rajatava Dutta
- Music by: Soumitra Kundu
- Release date: 18 March 2011
- Country: India
- Language: Bengali

Mon Bole Priya Priya is a 2011 Bengali film directed by Milan Bhowmik. This is a romantic film. According to director Milan Bhowmik– "It’s a love story on the extremes that true love can push one to." The movie was a remake of 2008 Tamil-language film Kadhalil Vizhunthen.

== Plot ==
Arjun travels to the city to seek admission in a college. Rich girl Priya is gifted a car without brakes by her uncle. Priya runs over Arjun and he loses his memory. Priya feels sorry for Arjun and romance begins to brew between the two. Ashish Vidyarthi plays the role of a good cop.

== Cast ==
- Raaj Bhowmik as Arjun
- Pamela as Priya
- Tapas Paul
- Ashish Vidyarthi
- Rajatava Dutta
- Rita Koiral
- Subhasish Mukherjee

== Songs ==
- "Kono Badha" – Sushati
- "Mon Bole Priya Priya" – Aneek Dhar & Somchandra
- "Tumi Ele Jibone" – Aneek & Anwesha
- "Ei Je Mati" – Aneek & Somchandra
- "Mon Bole Priya Priya" (Sad) – Aneek
- "Mon Bole Priya Priya" – Instrumental
