= Uma (TV series) =

2021 Indian television series

- Genre: Drama; Sport
- Created by: Tent Cinema
- Developed by: Tent Cinema
- Written by: Dialogues: Ananya; Ayan Sengupta
- Screenplay by: Malova Majumder
- Story by: Susanta Das; Sayantani Bhattacharya
- Directed by: Piyush Ghosh; Arghya Roy
- Creative directors: Susanta Das; Sayantani Bhattacharya
- Starring: Shinjinee Chakraborty; Neel Bhattacharya
- Theme music composer: Suvam
- Opening theme: "Swapner Tane Chhute Jay Uma"
- Country of origin: India
- Original language: Bengali
- No. of episodes: 348

Production
- Executive producers: Darshana Das & Ananya Das (Tent Cinema); Paramita, Priyanka Seth & Urbish Bose (Zee Bangla)
- Producer: Susanta Das
- Cinematography: Paritosh Singh
- Editors: Amitabha Bagchi; Krishnendu
- Camera setup: Multi-camera
- Running time: 22 minutes
- Production company: Tent Cinema

Original release
- Network: Zee Bangla
- Release: 13 September 2021 – 28 August 2022

Uma is a 2021 Indian Bengali language sport drama television series broadcast on the Bengali general entertainment channel Zee Bangla. It stars Shinjinee Chakraborty and Neel Bhattacharya in the lead roles. Initially it scored very well in TRP charts but later its popularity declined and it was replaced by Jagaddhatri. It was premiered on 13 September 2021. The series is produced by Tent Cinema.

== Plot ==
The story revolves around Uma who dreams of becoming a cricketer but is forced to give up on her dream due to familial obligations. However, her passion for the game and her husband Abhimanyu's constant motivation push her to realize her ambition and start playing cricket again.

== Cast ==
=== Main ===
- Shinjinee Chakraborty as Uma Acharya (née Das) - a cricketer, Abhi's wife, Aliya's former assistant, Sunanda and Sutapa's daughter, Soma's younger sister and Chumki's elder sister
- Neel Bhattacharya as Abhimanyu Acharya aka Abhi - a social worker and helper, Uma's husband, Aliya's former fiancé, Amrita and Ambarish's son, Anurag and Rikhiya's younger brother and Ishita's brother-in-law

=== Recurring ===
- Bhaskar Banerjee as Sunando Das: A pitch curator; Soma, Chumki and Uma's father and Sutapa's husband; Arabinda and Abhimanyu's father-in-law.
- Soma Banerjee as Sutapa Das: A housewife; Soma, Chumki and Uma's mother; late Sunando's wife; Arabinda and Abhimanyu's mother-in-law.
- Juiee Sarkar as Soma: Uma and Chumki's elder sister; Sutapa and late Sunando's eldest daughter; Arabinda's wife; Abhimanyu's elder sister-in-law.
- Debopriya Basu as Chumki Das aka Chutki: Uma and Soma's younger sister; late Sutapa and late Sunando's youngest daughter; Arabinda and Abhimanyu's younger sister-in-law.
- Shritama Mitra as Aliya Acharya (née Bose): a renowned cricketer; Abhi's love interest and close friend; Tarulata and Sanjay's daughter; Rudra's wife; Himadri's daughter-in-law. (Hanged)
- Sourya Bhattacharya as Rudra Acharya: Himadri's son; Anurag, Rikhiya, and Abhimanyu's paternal cousin brother; Aliya's husband; Tarulata and Sanjay's son-in-law.
- Maitreyee Mitra as Amrita Acharya: Anurag, Rikhiya and Abhimanyu's mother, Ishita and Uma's mother-in-law, Ambarish's wife; Suktara, Himadri, Sekhor, and Piu's eldest sister-in-law.
- Bharat Kaul as Ambarish Acharya: Anurag, Rikhiya and Abhimanyu's father, Ishita and Uma's father-in-law, Amrita's husband; Suktara, Himadri, Sekhor, and Piu's eldest brother.
- Subhosree Chakraborty as Rikhiya Acharya: Ambarish and Amrita's daughter; Anurag's younger sister; Abhimanyu's elder sister; Uma's elder sister-in-law.
- Vivaan Ghosh as Anurag Acharya aka Ani: Ishita's husband; Amrita and Ambarish's eldest son; Rikhiya and Abhimanyu's elder brother; Uma's elder brother-in-law; Mishti's father.
- Manasi Sengupta / Sudipta Banerjee / Tania Kar as Ishita Acharya: Anurag's wife; Rikhiya, Abhimanyu and Nandana's sister-in-law; Amrita and Ambarish's daughter-in-law; Mishti's mother.
- Avery Singha Roy as Joyeeta Acharya: Anurag, Rikhiya, and Abhimanyu's aunt; Sekhor's wife; Nandana's mother.
- Diganta Bagchi as Sekhor Acharya: Anurag, Rikhiya, and Abhimanyu's uncle; Joyeeta's husband; Nandana's father.
- Shriti Singh as Nandana Acharya: Anurag, Rikhiya, and Abhimanyu's younger paternal cousin sister; Joyeeta and Sekhor's only daughter.
- Amitabh Bhattacharjee as Himadri Acharya: Anurag, Rikhiya, and Abhimanyu's uncle.
- Basanti Chatterjee as Priyamvada Acharya: Anurag, Rikhiya, and Abhimanyu's grandmother; Ambarish, Suktara, Himadri, Sekhor and Piu's mother
- Chandicharan as Brahmapada Acharya: Anurag, Rikhiya, and Abhimanyu's grandfather; Priyamvada's husband; Ambarish, Suktara, Himadri, Sekhor and Piu's father.
- Nibedita Mukherjee as Suktara Gupta (née Acharya): Anurag, Rikhiya, and Abhimanyu's aunt; Somobroto's wife. She is a mother-figure to Abhi but Uma had a sour relation with her, which has absolutely changed.
- Surojit Banerjee as Somobroto Gupta: Anurag, Rikhiya, and Abhimanyu's uncle; Suktara's husband
- Reshmi Sen as Tarulata Bose: Sanjay's wife, Aliya's mother, Rudra's mother-in-law.
- Arindam Banerjee as Sanjay Bose: A corrupted politician; Tarulata's husband, Aliya's father, Rudra's father-in-law.
- Rimjhim Gupta as Swastika Chakrabarty (née Acharya) aka Piu: Anurag, Rikhiya, and Abhimanyu's aunt - Tapas's wife.
- Koushik Bhattacharya as Tapas Chakraborty : Anurag, Rikhiya, and Abhimanyu's uncle - Piu's husband.
- Chandraneev Mukherjee as Aurobindo: Abhimanyu's friend, Soma's husband, Uma and Chumki's brother-in-law.
- Dia Karmakar as Priya: Aliya's friend and Uma's rival.
- Rajiv Bose as Vikram Deb Chowdhury: A Financier and businessman.

== Reception ==
=== TRP ratings ===
| Week | Year | BARC Viewership | | Ref. |
| Week | Year | TRP | Rank | Ref. |
|---|---|---|---|---|
| Week 37 | 2021 | 8.7 | 3 | |
| Week 38 | 2021 | 8.1 | 3 | |
| Week 39 | 2021 | 7.6 | 3 | |
| Week 40 | 2021 | 7.7 | 3 | |
| Week 41 | 2021 | 7.4 | 3 | |
| Week 42 | 2021 | 8.1 | 3 | |
| Week 43 | 2021 | 8.1 | 4 | |
| Week 44 | 2021 | 7.9 | 3 | |
| Week 45 | 2021 | 8.6 | 2 | |
| Week 46 | 2021 | 9.3 | 2 | |
| Week 47 | 2021 | 8.6 | 3 | |
| Week 48 | 2021 | 9.0 | 2 | |
| Week 49 | 2021 | 9.5 | 2 | |
| Week 50 | 2021 | 9.3 | 3 | |
| Week 51 | 2021 | 8.9 | 4 | |
| Week 52 | 2021 | 9.3 | 3 | |
| Week 1 | 2022 | 10.2 | 2 | |
| Week 2 | 2022 | 9.3 | 2 | |
| Week 3 | 2022 | 8.9 | 5 | |
| Week 4 | 2022 | 8.3 | 6 | |
| Week 5 | 2022 | 7.3 | 9 | |
| Week 6 | 2022 | 7.4 | 7 | |
| Week 7 | 2022 | 7.6 | 8 | |
| Week 8 | 2022 | 7.2 | 9 | |
| Week 9 | 2022 | 7.2 | 9 | |
| Week 10 | 2022 | 7.9 | 8 | |
| Week 11 | 2022 | 8.1 | 7 | |
| Week 12 | 2022 | 8.5 | 4 | |
| Week 13 | 2022 | 8.0 | 4 | |
| Week 14 | 2022 | 7.6 | 4 | |
| Week 15 | 2022 | 6.4 | 5 | |
| Week 16 | 2022 | 6.9 | 5 | |
| Week 17 | 2022 | 6.2 | 7 | |
| Week 18 | 2022 | 6.4 | 6 | |
| Week 19 | 2022 | 6.6 | 6 | |
| Week 20 | 2022 | 5.9 | 9 | |
| Week 21 | 2022 | 5.6 | 10 | |
| Week 22 | 2022 | 5.9 | 7 | |
| Week 23 | 2022 | 6.0 | 7 | |
| Week 24 | 2022 | 6.5 | 6 | |
| Week 25 | 2022 | 6.5 | 8 | |
| Week 26 | 2022 | 6.3 | 7 | |
| Week 27 | 2022 | 6.0 | 7 | |
| Week 28 | 2022 | 6.2 | 7 | |
| Week 29 | 2022 | 6.2 | 7 | |
| Week 30 | 2022 | 5.8 | 9 | |
| Week 31 | 2022 | 6.2 | 6 | |
| Week 32 | 2022 | 6.5 | 7 | |
| Week 33 | 2022 | 6.4 | 7 | |
| Week 34 | 2022 | 6.7 | 7 | |
