= Thik Jeno Love Story =

Indian television series

- Genre: Drama; Comedy; Romance
- Created by: Shree Venkatesh Films
- Screenplay by: Saswati Ghosh; Dialogues; Antara Banerjee
- Directed by: Soumik Chatterjee; Subhojit Chakraborty
- Starring: Neel Bhattacharya; Sairity Banerjee; Debolina Dutta; Dipankar De
- Voices of: Arindam Chatterjee and Prashmita Paul
- Composer: Arindam Chatterjee
- Country of origin: India
- Original language: Bengali
- No. of episodes: 324

Production
- Producers: Shrikant Mohta; Mahendra Soni
- Production location: Kolkata
- Camera setup: Multi-camera
- Running time: 22 minutes
- Production company: Shree Venkatesh Films

Original release
- Network: Star Jalsha
- Release: 10 November 2014 – 21 November 2015

Thik Jeno Love Story is a Bengali television soap opera that premiered on 10 November 2014 and aired on Star Jalsha. It was produced by Shree Venkatesh Films and stars Neel Bhattacharya and Sairity Banerjee in lead roles.

== Plot ==
The story revolves around Isha, a simple girl full of life, and Adi, the spoilt brat of an influential politician. Isha, having lost her parents in childhood, grew up with her brothers, Prabal and Pratik, who dote on her. She is a die-hard romantic and spends her time with her two best friends, Pooja and Neha.

Pooja starts chatting with a mystery man on the Internet who turns out to be Adi. They plan to meet during the opening of a night club. Things, however, get out of hand and Pooja dies due to drug overdose while Isha is saved by Adi. The only witness to Pooja's death is Prabal, who considers Adi responsible for it. Isha however trusts Adi completely and saves him from accusations. Prabal becomes uncomfortable with Isha's growing relationship with Adi and warns him to stay away from his sister and insults him in the process.

Adi vows revenge and plans to manipulate Isha by promising to marry her. Unaware of Adi's evil ploys, Isha continues to fall for him and ends up marrying him. Adi, however, lifts the blindfold of trust from Isha's eyes and declares that it was all but a game for him, and that he did not consider the marriage to be anything serious. Isha then decides to leave Adi forever but is stopped by Adi's father, who believes that only Isha could save Adi from the path of self-destruction he was on. Isha decides to stay and give her relationship another chance as she believes in the basic goodness of Adi's heart.

== Cast ==
- Neel Bhattacharya as Adidev Bose / Adi
- Sairity Banerjee as Late Isha Bose (née Mitra) / Aankhi Bose (née Mitra)
- Dipankar De as Ranjan Bose
- Debolina Dutta as Rajeshwari / Mon
- Manoj Ojha as Agnidev Bose / Natun Gosain
- Ananya Biswas as Ani
- Avrajit Chakraborty as Sanjay
- Dolon Roy as Krishna
- Arijit Chakraborty as Probal Mitra
- John Bhattacharya as Rohit
- Ayesha Bhattacharya as Tiya
- Mita Chatterjee as Adi's grandmother
- Moumita Chakraborty as Menoka
- Sohan Bandopadhyay as Raktim
- Debdut Ghosh as Siddhartha Bose
- Soham Basu Roy Chowdhury as Nonta
- Runa Bandopadhyay as Kaberi
- Rupam Roy as Pratik Mitra
- Deerghoi Paul as Neha
- Alivia Sarkar as Pooja
- Ashmita Chakraborty as Mimi
- Somraj Maity as Tunir Sengupta
- Sourav Das as Kripan
- Anindya Bose as Siddhartha
- Sanchaari Das as Komol

== Awards ==
Year	Award	Category	Result
2015	Tele Academy Awards	Best Makeup	Won
