= Neel Bhattacharya =

Indian television actor

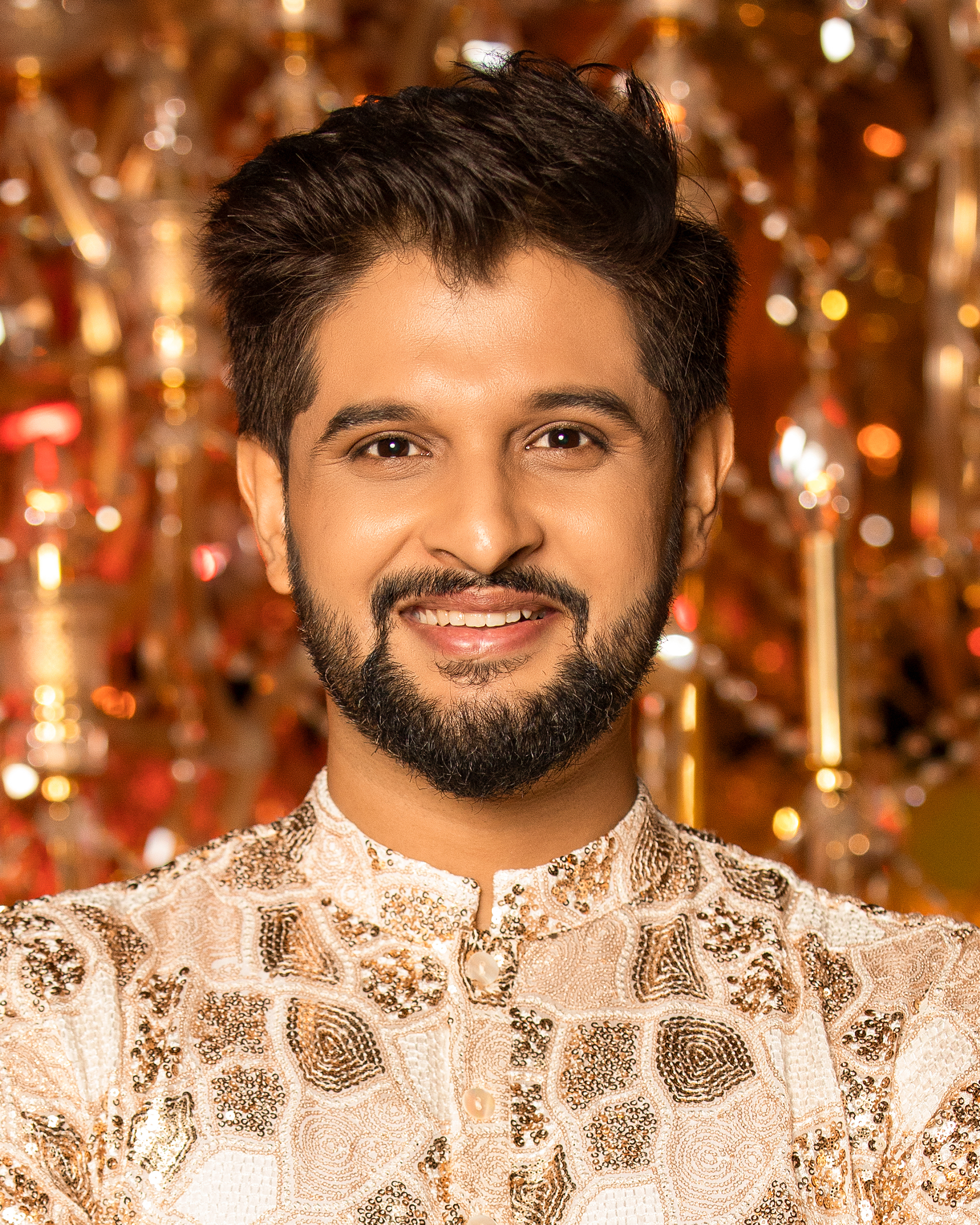
- Bhattacharya in 2024
- Born: Abhijit Bhattacharya; 8 June 1990 (age 36)
- Citizenship: Indian
- Education: St. Xavier's College, Kolkata; Institute of Engineering and Management
- Occupation: Actor
- Known for: Nikhil in Krishnakoli; Prwithwijit Deb in Stree
- Notable work: Thik Jeno Love Story (2014); Stree (2016); Krishnakoli (2018) Amar Sangee (2024)
- Political party: Trinamool Congress (2021–present)
- Spouse: Trina Saha (m. 2021)

Neel Bhattacharya (born 8 June 1990) is an Indian television actor. He started his career in television as a lead actor through Thik Jeno Love Story and is well known for portraying the character of Prwithwijit Deb in Stree, Nikhil in Krishnakoli and Raj Ghoshal in Amar Sangee.

== Career ==
Beside working in TV soap operas, Neel has also acted in a few Bengali movies, notably Chitra and Lokkhyo. He has also performed as the lead male actor in many music videos like Chaina (Don't want), composed and sung by Shaan, Yeh Dil Hai Bekarar by Benny Dayal.

== Television ==
Year	Title	Role	Language	Channel	Production company(s)	Ref.
2014–2015	Thik Jeno Love Story	Adidev Bose / Adi	Bengali	Star Jalsha	Shree Venkatesh Films	
2016–2018	Stree	Prwithwijit Deb / Aksar Sen	Bengali	Zee Bangla	Blues Productions	
2018–2022	Krishnakoli	Nikhil Choudhury	Bengali	Zee Bangla	Tent Cinema	
2021–2022	Uma	Abhimanyu Acharya aka Abhi	Bengali	Zee Bangla	Tent Cinema	
2022–2023	Bangla Medium	Vikram Chatterjee aka Vicky	Bengali	Star Jalsha	Tent Cinema	
2024–2025	Amar Sangee	Raj Ghoshal	Bengali	Zee Bangla	Nideas Creations	
2025–2026	Bhole Baba Par Kare Ga	Dr. Shakya Chatterjee	Bengali	Star Jalsha	Magic Moments Motion Pictures	
2026–Present	Dulari	Riddho Chowdhury	Bengali	Zee Bangla	Crazy Ideas Media	

== Filmography ==
Year	Title	Role	Language	Ref.
2012	Paanch Adhyay	Cameo as football player	Bengali	
2015	Chitra		Bengali	
2018	Dariya (Short film)		Hindi	
2020	Lokkhyo		Bengali	
2024	Sentimentaaal	Special Appearance	Bengali	

=== Television movies ===
Year	Title	Role	Language	Comments
2016	Selfier Phande		Bengali	

== Awards ==
Year	Award	Category	Name
2015	Tele Academy Award 2015	Best New face	As Adi in Thik Jeno Love Story
2018	Zee Bangla Sonar Sansar	Best Chele	As Prithwiraj in Stree
2019	Zee Bangla Sonar Sansar	Best Chele	As Nikhil in Krishnakoli
2019	Zee Bangla Sonar Sansar	Best Jodi	As Nikhil-Shyama in Krishnakoli
2020	Zee Bangla Sonar Sansar	Best Chele	As Nikhil in Krishnakoli
2020	Zee Bangla Sonar Sansar	Digital Influencer of the Year	As Nikhil in Krishnakoli
2020	Zee Bangla Sonar Sansar	Best Jodi	As Nikhil-Shyama in Krishnakoli
2021	Zee Bangla Sonar Sansar	Best Actor	Nikhil in Krishnakoli
2021	Zee Bangla Sonar Sansar	Best Chele	Nikhil in Krishnakoli
2021	Zee Bangla Sonar Sansar	Best Jodi	Nikhil-Shyama in Krishnakoli
2023	West Bengal Telly Academy Awards 2023	Sera Juti	Indira-Bikram in Bangla Medium
2025	Zee Bangla Sonar Sansar	Best Chele	As Raj in Amar Sangee
2019	Tele Academy Awards	Best Couple	As Nikhil in Krishnakoli
2019	Shyama Prasad Bangiya Samman	Best Jodi	As Nikhil in Krishnakoli
2025	Tele Academy Award 2025	Best Son	As Shakya in Bhole Baba Par Karega
