= Krishna Tulasi (TV series) =

Indian-Telugu language soap opera

- Genre: Soap opera
- Starring: Aishwarya H Dileep R Shetty
- Country of origin: India
- Original language: Telugu
- No. of episodes: 551

Production
- Producer: K. Raghavendra Rao
- Camera setup: Multi-camera
- Running time: 22 minutes

Original release
- Network: Zee Telugu
- Release: 22 February 2021 – 26 November 2022

Related
- Krishnakoli

Krishna Tulasi is an Indian Telugu language soap opera which premiered on 22 February 2021 on Zee Telugu. It stars Aishwarya H and Dileep Shetty. The series was produced by Raghavendra Rao. It is an official remake of Zee Bangla TV series Krishnakoli.

== Plot ==
Shyama is a young, dusky girl, who faces discrimination because of her skin color. However, she is talented and sets out on a journey, to create an identity for herself. She believes that her complexion is akin to Lord Krishna's complexion. Her life changes after marriage when she goes on to make a career in music.

== Cast ==
=== Main ===
- Aishwarya H as Shyama Akhil Verma
- Dileep Shetty as Akhil Verma

=== Recurring ===
- Lakshmi Siddaiah as Vasantha
- JL Srinivas as Ananda Gajapati Varma
- Nakshatra as Sanjana
- Pavitranath as Mallikarjun
- Priyanka Shivanna as Aishwariya
- Teja as Govind
- Radhika Reddy as Vaidedhi
- Swathi as Shoba
- Srinivas as Ashok Varma
- Ajay as Narayana
- Aadhya as Roopa Rani
- Sathwik as Kittu
- Prathyusha as Haripriya
- Roopa Reddy as Guruvamma
- Suhan as Arun Varma

== Adaptations ==
Language	Title	Original release	Network(s)	Last aired	Notes
Bengali	Krishnakoli কৃষ্ণকলি	18 June 2018	Zee Bangla	9 January 2022	Original
Telugu	Krishna Tulasi కృష్ణ తులసి	22 February 2021	Zee Telugu	26 November 2022	Remake
Bhojpuri	Shyam Tulasi श्याम तुलसी	20 September 2021	Zee Ganga	29 July 2022	Remake
Tamil	Karthigai Deepam கார்த்திகை தீபம்	5 December 2022	Zee Tamil	Ongoing	Remake
Malayalam	Shyamambaram ശ്യാമാംബരം	6 February 2023	Zee Keralam	29 September 2024	Remake
Marathi	Savlyachi Janu Savali सावळ्याची जणू सावली	23 September 2024	Zee Marathi	Ongoing	Remake
