= Kora Pakhi =

Indian television series

- Genre: Drama; Romance
- Written by: Leena Gangopadhyay; Paromita Sengupta
- Directed by: Diganta Sinha
- Creative directors: Leena Gangopadhyay; Suparna Laha
- Presented by: Bright Advertising Pvt. Ltd.
- Starring: Parno Mittra; Rishi Kaushik; Titas Bhowmik
- Theme music composer: Debojyoti Mishra
- Opening theme: Kora Pakhi by Anweshaa
- Country of origin: India
- Original language: Bengali
- No. of seasons: 1
- No. of episodes: 205

Production
- Executive producers: Sajal Biswas; Deep; Partha Dey
- Producer: Leena Gangopadhyay
- Production locations: Kolkata; Purulia
- Cinematography: Madhab Naskar
- Camera setup: Multi-camera
- Running time: 22 minutes (approx.)
- Production company: Magic Moments Motion Pictures

Original release
- Network: STAR Jalsha
- Release: 13 January 2020 – 1 January 2021

Related
- Kunjochaya; Desher Maati

Kora Pakhi is an Indian Bengali television soap opera that premiered on 13 January 2020 and aired on Bengali General Entertainment Channel Star Jalsha, It is also available on the digital platform Hotstar. The show was produced by Magic Moments Motion Pictures of Saibal Banerjee and Leena Gangopadhyay, and starred Parno Mittra and Rishi Kaushik.

The show marked the comeback of Parno Mittra on Bengali television after a decade and Rishi Kaushik's comeback after more than a year, since the end of his last show, Kusum Dola, also helmed by Leena Gangopadhyay. Titas Bhowmik featured as the parallel lead in this show.

== Plot ==
Abandoned at birth, Amon is raised as a tribal village girl and aspires to create an identity of her own as a journalist in one of Kolkata's leading newspapers. A chance encounter with the city-bred and jovial Ankur changes Amon's fate forever as love blossoms between the two while Amon's quest to find her roots and become independent continues. The story also revealed about Amon's birth identity as the daughter of Gulu and Bonny.

== Cast ==
=== Main ===
- Parno Mittra as Amon Banerjee - Bonny and Gulu's estranged daughter raised by tribals, a journalist, Ankur's ex-wife
- Rishi Kaushik as Ankur Banerjee - owner of a tours and travels company, Amon's ex-husband, Medha's love interest
- Titas Bhowmik as Medha Sinha - Bonny and Mimi's adopted daughter; Ankur's friend, lover and business partner

=== Recurring ===
- Sumanta Mukherjee as Jadabendra Banerjee aka Jodu - Radharani's husband, Ankur's father
- Anashua Majumdar / Moumita Gupta as Radharani Banerjee - Jodu's wife, Ankur's mother
- Surojit Banerjee as Chitrabhanu Banerjee aka Bhanu - Jodu's younger brother, Nandini's husband, Ankur's younger paternal uncle, Ajaan and Ahaan's father
- Rajashree Bhowmik as Rangana Banerjee - Bhanu's wife, Ankur's younger aunt, Ajaan and Ahaan's mother
- Kushal Chakraborty as Agnibesh Banerjee aka Benu - Jodu's youngest brother, Suhasini's husband, Ankur's youngest paternal uncle
- Manjusree Ganguly as Suhasini Banerjee - Benu's wife, Ankur's youngest aunt
- Dwaipayan Das as Ahaan Banerjee - Ankur's younger cousin brother, Bhanu and Nandini's younger son, Ajaan's younger twin brother, Bonolata's friend and love interest
- Aishwarya Sen as Bonolata Banerjee - Ajaan's widow, Ahaan's friend and love interest
- Jyotsna Majumdar as Chandboni Soren aka "Chand Maasi" - Ankur's family's domestic help, Amon's fellow villager and wellwisher
- Debesh Ray Chowdhury as Parimal Hansda aka Pori - Rangta village's elder tribal man. He raised Amon and hence, he is her adoptive grandfather
- Rita Dutta Chakraborty as Mrinalini Sen aka Gulu - a popular author and college professor, Mimi's adoptive elder cousin sister, formerly Bonny's wife, Amon's estranged mother
- Bharat Kaul as Devdut Sinha aka Bonny - the managing director and creative head of one of Kolkata's leading newspapers, Mimi and Gulu's husband, Gulu's lover, Amon's estranged father, Medha's adoptive father
- Malabika Sen as Monidipa Sinha aka Mimi - Gulu's adoptive younger cousin sister, Bonny's second wife, Medha's adoptive mother.
- Rahul Chakraborty as Surjo Sen - a senior journalist and Amon's well-wisher.
- Sreya Bhattacharyya as Tuli - Bonny's sororal niece.
- Diganta Bagchi as Ratna Sen - a lawyer, Bonny's friend.
- Tathagata Mukherjee as Dweepjoy, a lawyer.
- Subrata Banarjee as Rathin Roy - Amon's boss, Devdut's rival.
