= Malabika Sen =

Indian Bengali classical dancer, singer and actress

Malobika Sen
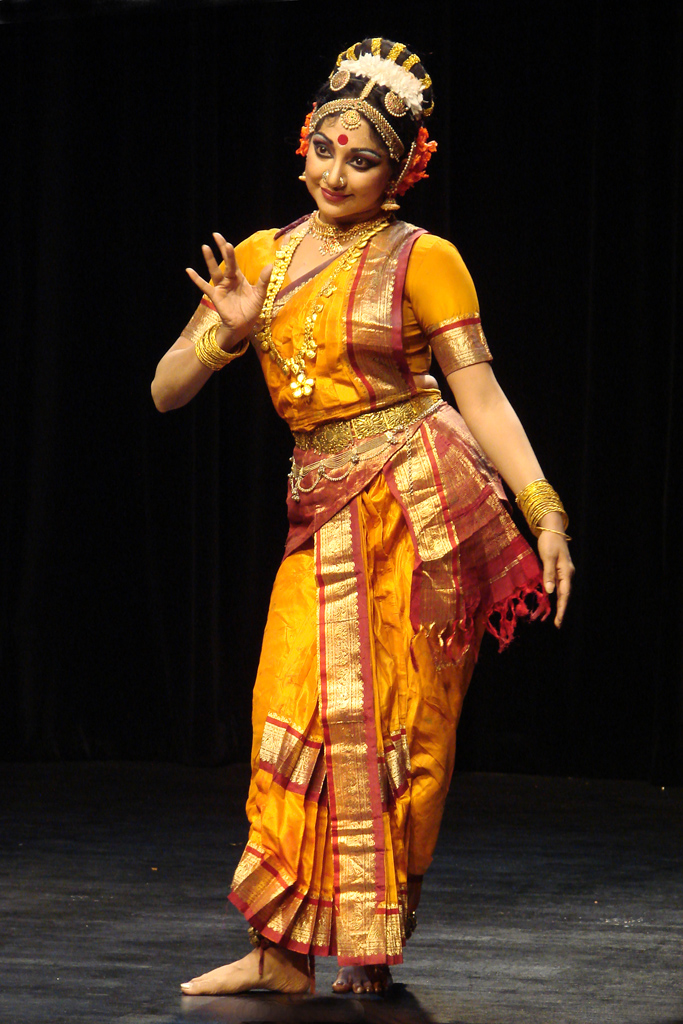
- Malabika Sen performing at Guimet Museum in 2008
- Born: Kolkata
- Occupations: Dancer; Actress
- Known for: Bhagshesh (2018); Sreemoyee (2019)
- Spouse: Late Sumit Sen

Malobika Sen (also known as Malabika Sen; born 27 August 1967) is an Indian classical dancer, singer and actress.

== Career ==
Sen is a trained Bharatnatyam and Kuchipudi dancer. She obtained her formal training in Kuchipudi from Sreemoyee Venkat and in Bharatnatyam from Thankamani Kutty. She is one of the empaneled solo artist of Bharatnatyam and Kuchipudi at ICCR. She has performed live in almost all major platforms in India and abroad with distinction. She is also a senior member of Kalamandalam dance group.

She is also a trained singer in North Indian classical vocal music and Nazrul Geeti under the guidance of Dr. Chameli Sarkar and Smt. Rama Basu. Some of her works includes Lag Ja Gale, Na Jeo Na, Meri Jaan and Eto Boro Akash. She has also rendered her voice in the song Ke Bole composed by Pandit Jayanta Bose, from the bengali film Bhagshesh (2018).

In addition, she has also starred in many Bengali films and TV soap operas.

=== Filmography ===
- Shada Canvas (2014)
- Posto (2017)
- Bhagshesh (2018)

=== Television ===
Year	Title	Role	Language	Channel	Comments
2014	Dance Bangla Dance	Judge	Bengali	Zee Bangla	
2014-2016	Tumi Robe Nirobe	Malobika Sen	Bengali	Zee Bangla	
2016 - 2018	Bhakter Bhogobaan Shri Krishna	Padmavati	Bengali	Star Jalsha	
2017	Bikele Bhorer Phool	Moyna's Teacher	Bengali	Zee Bangla	
2018 - 2019	Phagun Bou	Malabika Ghosh	Bengali	Star Jalsha	
2019 - 2021	Sreemoyee	Madhubani Sen	Bengali	Star Jalsha	
2020 - 2021	Kora Pakhi	Monidipa Sinha Mimi	Bengali	Star Jalsha	
2020 - 2022	Khorkuto	Dr. Shilpi Bose	Bengali	Star Jalsha	
2021 - 2022	Roja	Roja's Mother	Bengali	Star Jalsha	Enterr10 Bangla
2021 - 2023	Sundari	Gayatri	Bengali	Sun Bangla	
2022 - 2023	Guddi	Shirin's mother(chaitali)	Bengali	Star Jalsha	
2023	Nayika No.1	Malabika Sen	Bengali	Colors Bangla	
2023 - 2024	Icche Putul	Salini Sanyal, Roop's mother	Bengali	Zee Bangla	
2024	Jol Thoi Thoi Bhalobasha	Mayurakshi	Bengali	Star Jalsha	
2024–2025	Puber Moyna	Tramila, Gunja's mother	Bengali	Zee Bangla	
2025–2026	Chirosokha	Ananya	Bengali	Star Jalsha	
2025–2026	Bhole Baba Par Karega	Chhuti	Bengali	Star Jalsha	
2026–Present	Baghini		Bengali	Zee Bangla	
