= Rimli =

Indian Bengali television series

- Genre: Drama; Society
- Created by: Acropoliis Entertainment
- Developed by: Acropoliis Entertainment
- Screenplay by: Jyoti Hazra; Dialogue; Souvik Mitra
- Story by: Acropolis Creative Team
- Directed by: Soumen Haldar
- Starring: Idhika Paul; John Bhattacharya; Bidipta Chakraborty
- Theme music composer: Pranjal
- Opening theme: "Sonar Fosol Folay Rimli"
- Country of origin: India
- Original language: Bengali
- No. of episodes: 217

Production
- Executive producers: Arnab (Acropoliis); Priyanka Seth & Suparno Saha (Zee Bangla)
- Producers: Snigdha Basu; Sani Ghosh Ray
- Production locations: Kolkata, West Bengal, India
- Cinematography: Abhishek Chakraborty
- Editors: Nilanjan; Deepak
- Camera setup: Multi-camera
- Running time: 22 minutes
- Production company: Acropoliis Entertainment

Original release
- Network: Zee Bangla
- Release: 15 February – 26 September 2021

Rimli is an Indian Bengali Language Drama television series which was broadcast on Bengali General Entertainment Channel Zee Bangla and was also available on the digital platform ZEE5 even before TV telecast. It starred Idhika Paul and John Bhattacharya in the lead roles. It was premiered on 15 February 2021. The series was produced by Acropoliis Entertainment. It was about a farming girl Rimli. The show went off air on 26 September 2021, due to low television ratings.

== Synopsis ==
The courageous village belle, Rimli, who isn't afraid of raising her voice in case of any wrong. Rimli belongs to a family of farmers. She works hard to earn the living. She is honest and hardworking. When some influential people try to deprive the poor villagers, she protests. Consequently, she marries Uday but at first is rejected by him and his family members. Soon as time passes Rimli wins the heart of her husband and her in-laws but still was hated by some family members. Rimli afterwards expose Pratik who try to abuse her. She also saves her sister-in-law twice from goons and wins her heart and her mother-in-law. Her mother-in-law gives an important responsibility to Rimli. But later on, she disabled her mind and started to dislike Rimli. When there was again, Uday and Srija's marriage, Lopa started to realise that what she did was wrong. In the meantime, Morol misteaches Madhai. When Madhai reached their house, he shot Uday with a gun. Uday went to the hospital and Tanisha thought that Rimli is responsible about shooting Uday. When Kolmilata got the news, Morol was blackmailing her. Later on, Kolmilata killed Morol. Later on, Rimli took a great care of Uday. Then, Rimli solved the mystery of the letter. Then, it was revealed that Rupjit was the imposter. Then, Tanisha realised her mistakes and gave the full house responsibility to Rimli.

== Cast ==
=== Main ===
- Idhika Paul as Rimli: A farm girl; Uday's wife, Deba master's and Tara's daughter
- John Bhattacharya as Uday Mukherjee: A young man, who is a student of agriculture; Tanisha and Asit's younger son; Rimli's husband.

=== Recurring ===
- Bidipta Chakraborty as Tanisha Mukherjee (née Chattopadhyay): Owner of the field, where Rimli is cultivating crops; a businesswoman; Indra, Uday and Jinia's mother; Asit's wife; Brajo Gopal's daughter; Soumili and Rimli's mother-in-law.
- Rajat Ganguly as Brojo Gopal Chattopadhyay: Tanisha's father; Indra, Jinia, Uday's maternal grandfather; Rimli, Soumili's maternal grandfather-in-law.
- Kaushik Chakraborty as Asit Boron Mukherjee: Tanisha's husband; a businessman; late Debraj's (Debo master, Rimli's father) friend; Indra, Uday and Jinia's father; Chandrani and Rupjit's elder brother; Soumili and Rimli's father-in-law. (Flashback)
- Mallika Majumdar as Kolmilata aka Kolmi: Rimli's maternal aunt; Madhai's wife; Tagar, Ghontu's mother, Morol's killer.
- Debranjan Nag as Madhai: Rimli's maternal uncle; Kolmi's husband; Tagar, Ghontu's father.
- Sohini Sanyal as Chandrani Chatterjee aka Chandra (née Mukherjee): Asit's younger sister; Roopjit's elder sister; Koyena's mother; Late Abhijit's wife; Tanisha, Lopa's sister-in-law; Uday, Indra, Jinia, Pratik's paternal aunt; Soumili, Rimli's paternal aunt-in-law.
- Sanchari Mondal as Koyena Chatterjee: Chandrani's daughter; Indra, Jinia, Pratik, Uday's cousin sister.
- Ananda Chowdhury as Indrajeet Mukherjee: Tanisha and Asit's elder son; Uday and Jinia's elder brother; Soumili's husband; Aarav's father; Koyena and Pratik's elder cousin brother; Rimli's elder brother-in-law.
- Ujani Dasgupta as Soumili Mukherjee: Tanisha's elder daughter-in-law; Indra's wife; Uday and Jinia's elder sister-in-law; Rimli's elder sister-in-law; Aarav's mother; Koyena and Pratik's elder cousin sister-in-law
- Aishik Mukherjee as Aarav Mukherjee: Indra and Soumili's son; Uday, Jinia's nephew; Tanisha's grandson.
- Priya Mondal / Arpita Mondal as Jinia Mukherjee: Tanisha and Asit's younger daughter, Indra and Uday's younger sister, Pratik and Koyena's cousin sister.
- Debraj Mukherjee as Rupjit Boron Mukherjee: Asit and Chandrani's younger brother; Lopa's husband; Pratik's father; Indra, Uday, Koyena, Jinia's uncle.
- Poushmita Goswami as Lopamudra Mukherjee aka Lopa: Roopjeet's wife; Pratik's mother; Indra, Uday, Koyena, Jinia's aunt.
- Indranil Mallick as Param: Uday's friend, Who liked Rimli his own sister.
- Sreetoma Roy Chowdhury as Srija Mukherjee (née Guha): a rich girl; Uday's love interest and ex-fiancée; Pratik's wife.
- Avijit Sengupta as Subrata Guha: Srija's father; Tanisha's business partner.
- Kunal Banerjee as Joy: Koyena's love interest.
- Mainak Dhole as Pratik Mukherjee: Rupjit's and Lopa's son; Indra, Uday, Jinia and Koyena's cousin brother; Srija's husband.
- Ratan Sarkhel as Morol: headman of Muradidanga village; Uday and Rimli's rival.
- Biresh Chakrabarty as Poltu: Morol's son.
- Gora Dhar as Mahajan: moneylender of Muradidanga village; Morol's crime partner; Uday and Rimli's rival.
