= Bikele Bhorer Phool =

Indian Bengali television series

- Genre: Drama; Comedy; Romance
- Created by: Blues Productions
- Written by: Snehasish Chakraborty
- Directed by: Bijoy Jana
- Starring: Amitabh Bhattacharjee; Sudipta Chakrabarty; Sneha Chatterjee; Mousumi Saha
- Opening theme: Bikele Bhorer Phool by Dipanwita
- Composer: Snehasish Chakraborty
- Country of origin: India
- Original language: Bengali
- No. of episodes: 235

Production
- Producer: Snehasish Chakraborty
- Production location: Kolkata
- Running time: 22 minutes
- Production company: Blues Productions

Original release
- Network: Zee Bangla
- Release: February 27 – December 1, 2017

Bikele Bhorer Phool was an Indian Bengali series which airs on Zee Bangla channel. It starred Sudipta Chakraborty and Amitabh Bhattacharjee in the lead roles and Sneha Chatterjee in a pivotal role. The show was written and directed by Snehasish Chakraborty. It premiered on 27 February 2017 and airs at 9:00 pm from Monday to Saturday. Its final episode aired on 1 December 2017. It was replaced by Bokul Kotha.

== Plot ==
It is an unusual love story of a village girl and a city-bred doctor. The show focuses on a young Moina and a middle-aged Dr. Subhankar who get married in a turn of events. Life takes a turn when poor and naughty Moina is introduced to the luxurious lifestyle of Dr. Subhankar and his family members. Moina creates trouble and havoc in the lives of Subhankar's family members and she is disliked by them. However, Nupur, who loves Subhankar, decides to train Moina and make her eligible for Dr. Subhankar. 'Bikele Bhorer Phool' is a unique phrase which describes Moina and Dr. Subhankar's love story. The saying goes - "When two souls are meant for each other, they will find a way to meet, however different they are." Love is indeed the acceptance of difference not the search for similarities and more the difference, steadier the relationship. When Moyna, a high-spirited, fun-loving, mischievous, unruly, pampered village belle meets a city-bred, serious, no-nonsense, middle-aged, mellow Doctor, Subhankar, there is a war of words, thoughts and outlook towards life. Subhankar's disciplined character and thought process is obliterated right away by the simple facts of life as derived by Moyna. They say marriages are made in heaven. On earth, society's set rules of discrimination of age, caste, creed, background take a back seat in 'Bikele Bhorer Phool' where two diametrically opposite persons refuse to give up on each other and embark on a divine journey of marriage.

Dr. Subhankar realizes that Moina needs to be educated to adjust with her family who have all completed their Masters. She is admitted to a school on recommendations. Meanwhile, Konok Kakon plots a dangerous plot to get the ownership of Dr. Subhankar Banerjee Nursing Home from Subhankar. She puts public pressure on him and succeeds in her mission. Marriage of Nupur or according to Moina Bhalo Didi's has been fixed. Shubhankar has decided to take the responsibility.

Moina does not know that her father is alive and her father is none other than Konok Kakon's husband. Konok Kakon will try to kill Moina but Nupur will save her from death. Moina will save the Banerjee family from troubles and danger. Will Nupur die what is awaiting them? Moina saves Nupur from the dangerous plot by Konok Kakon. Later Subhankar signs the property papers and makes the Banerjee house in Dipankar wife Anjali's name. Will Moina save the Banerjee house from selling to someone else? Moyna will finally know that her father is none other than Palash Patra (Konok Kakon's husband). She will run to him to the hospital but Konok Kakon makes a fake Moina to go to Polash before Moina does. Will Moina expose Konok Kakon and the fake Moina? Later, Konok Khakon Makes a conspiracy against Subhankar to make his clinic in her name and make him jailed for a fake death case but her plan succeeded on making the Subhankar"s clinic in her name and she does not succeed in putting Subhankar in jail. Moina Saves him on Time and exposes Konok Khakon in front of everyone and then Anjali tries to create a misunderstanding between Moina and Nupur a.k.a. (Balo didi) and she succeeds in making a rift between Moina and Balo didi and Moina Leaves the Banerjee house because of this and she vows to bring Subhankar Doctor Register Certificate back. After many Twist, Moina Come back to Banerjee house to Give Dr Subhankar Banerjee his doctor register certificate back to his aunt and Subhankar"s aunt accepts Moina as the eldest daughter-in-law of Banerjee house. In the last episode, Nupur marries Aditya and Subhankar meets with an accident (which turned out to be a fake and a plan between Subhankar and Moina just to expose Aditya's true colours in front of everyone), but later forgives Aditya for his misdeeds. The show ends on a happy note with Subhankar and Moina confessing their love for each other and they unite.

== Cast ==
=== Main ===
- Sudipta Chakraborty as Moina Banerjee (née Patra) - Subhankar's wife and Shyama's daughter
- Amitabha Bhattacharjee as Dr. Subhankar Banerjee a.k.a. Shubho - Moina's husband

=== Recurring ===
- Sneha Chatterjee as Nupur Chhanda Chatterjee – Subhankar's long time partner
- Mousumi Saha as Anjali Banerjee – the head of Banerjee residence
- Sagarika Roy as Shyama Patra – Moyna's mother, Subhankar's mother in-law and Palash's wife
- Biplab Banerjee as Polash Patra, Moina's estranged father, Konok Khakon husband
- Koushik Das as Tirthankar Banerjee a.k.a. Tirtha – a musician, Subhankar's youngest brother and Deepika's husband
- Maitreyee Ghatak as Deepika - Tirtha's wife
- Moumita Chakraborty as Kanak Kankon – Palash's second wife, Moyna's step mother
- Siddhartha Banerjee as Dipankar Banerjee a.k.a. Deep – Subhankar's younger brother and Riddhi's husband
- Rumpa Das as Riddhi Banerjee – Deep's wife
- Sayantani Majumder as Doctor Gita
- Malabika Sen as Moyna's Teacher
- Misty Singh as Pupu - Deep, Tirtha and Subhankar's Sister, Moyna, Riddhi and Deepika's sister in-law, Pradipta's wife
- Sudip Sengupta as Doctor Pradipta - Pupu's husband, a doctor
- Aditya Chowdhury as Aditya – Nupur's husband
- Purbasha Roy as Doctor Purba
