= Hok Kolorob (film) =

2026 Indian Bengali film by Raj Chakraborty

- Theatrical release poster
- Bengali: হোক কলরব
- Literally: Let There Be Noise
- Directed by: Raj Chakraborty
- Screenplay by: Souvik Bhattacharya
- Story by: Raj Chakraborty
- Produced by: Subhashree Ganguly
- Starring: Saswata Chatterjee; Partho Bhowmik; Rohaan Bhattacherjee; Om Sahani; John Bhattacharya; Sreya Bhattacharyya; Abhika Malakar; Debdutta Raha; Pushan Dasgupta; Samiul Alam; Akash Malik; Arnab Biswas
- Cinematography: Manas Ganguly
- Edited by: Md.Kalam
- Music by: Songs: Ishan Mitra; Dolaan Mainnakk; Amit Chatterjee
- Production company: Raj Chakraborty Entertainment Private Limited
- Distributed by: PVR Inox Pictures
- Release date: 23 January 2026
- Running time: 131 Minutes
- Country: India
- Language: Bengali

Hok Kolorob (Bengali: হোক কলরব, lit. 'Let There Be Noise' ) is a 2026 Indian Bengali-language vigilante political thriller film written and directed by Raj Chakraborty and produced by Subhashree Ganguly under the banner of Raj Chakraborty Entertainment Private Limited. Starring Saswata Chatterjee in the lead role, the film was released theatrically on 23 January 2026.

== Plot ==
Drawing inspiration from real-life events that happened at Jadavpur University in 2023, the film depicts the death of a first-year student in a university hostel allegedly due to ragging, examining the resulting public outcry regarding institutional accountability and systemic negligence.

== Cast ==
- Saswata Chatterjee as Inspector Khudiram Chaki
- Partho Bhowmik
- Rohaan Bhattacherjee as Saikat Nandy
- Sreya Bhattacharyya as SI Bonhi Ray
- Om Sahani as Farhan
- John Bhattacharya as Gaurav Bhattacharya
- Debdutta Raha as Rudra Bhowmik
- Pushan Dasgupta
- Samiul Alam
- Akash Malik
- Abhika Malakar
- Arnab Biswas

== Release ==
Hok Kolorob was released in theatres across West Bengal on 23 January 2026. Teaser of Hok Kolorob was released on 25 December 2025.

== Reception ==
=== Critical reception ===
Eshna Bhattacharya of The Times of India rated the film 3/5 stars and wrote "Hok Kolorob remains a sincere and emotionally driven film that addresses significant social issues. Its strong performances, especially from Saswata Chatterjee, and its commitment to relevant themes ensure it maintains engagement and emotional impact throughout." She applauded John Bhattacharya, Sreya Bhattacharyya and Rohan Bhattacharjee in their respective roles, the screenplay, impactful dialogues, cinematography and well staged crowd scenes but criticized the storytelling for resorting to heightened drama, the overstretched and stylised protest sequences, the increasing melodramatic tone in the second half, the unnecessarily loud background score in certain scenes that reduces the subtlety of performances and the situation, poorly choreographed action sequences and the occasional comedy that does no help but disrupting the emotional continuity.
