= Jogomaya =

2024 Indian television series

- Genre: Drama; Romance; Thriller
- Created by: Blues Productions
- Developed by: Blues Productions
- Written by: Dialogues; Snehasish Chakraborty
- Screenplay by: Snehasish Chakraborty
- Story by: Snehasish Chakraborty
- Directed by: Vidyut Saha
- Creative director: Snehasish Chakraborty
- Starring: Neha Amandeep; Syed Arefin
- Opening theme: "Jogomaya"
- Composer: Snehasish Chakraborty
- Country of origin: India
- Original language: Bengali
- No. of seasons: 1
- No. of episodes: 107

Production
- Executive producers: Runa Dey Sarkar; Susanta Daripa (Blues Productions); Paromita & Urvish Bose (Zee Bangla)
- Producer: Snehasish Chakraborty
- Production location: Kolkata
- Cinematography: Amitava Chakraborty
- Editors: Bapon Pramanik; Sumit Karmakar
- Camera setup: Multi-camera
- Running time: 22 Minutes
- Production company: Blues Productions

Original release
- Network: Zee Bangla
- Release: 11 March – 5 July 2024

Jogomaya is a 2024 Indian Bengali Romantic Thriller Drama television series that released on 11 March 2024 on Zee Bangla. The series is produced under the banner of Blues Productions. It stars Neha Amandeep and Syed Arefin in lead roles.

== Cast ==
=== Main ===
- Neha Amandeep as Jogomaya Chatterjee (née Halder) - Mintu and Sukla's daughter; Mahamaya's sister; Rehan's Wife
- Syed Arefin as Rehan Chatterjee - Rajeshwar and Anuradha's son; Rudrani's younger brother; Rema's ex-fiánce; Jogomaya's Husband; Arna's lover

=== Recurring ===
- Ashim Mukhopadhyay as Mrinal Halder aka Mintu Rickshawala - Jogomaya and Mahamaya's father
- Somasree Chaki as Shukla Halder - Jogomaya and Mahamaya's mother; Mintu's wife
- Monalisa Das as Mahamaya Halder - Jogomaya's younger sister
- Biplab Dasgupta as Sarbeshwar Chatterjee - An Advocate, Rajeshwar and Vishweshwar's elder brother; Sanjoy and Rob's father
- Kaushik Banerjee as Rajeshwar Chatterjee - A doctor, Sarbeshwar's younger brother; Vishweshwar's elder brother; Anuradha's husband; Rudrani and Rehan's father
- Ananya Biswas as Rudrani Chatterjee - Rajeshwar and Anuradha's daughter; Rehan's elder sister
- Sutapa Banerjee as Anuradha Chatterjee - Rajeshwar's wife; Rudrani and Rehan's mother
- Rana Mitra as Vishweshwar Chatterjee - Subha's husband; Sarbeshwar and Rajeshwar's younger brother
- Mallika Banerjee as Subha Chatterjee - Vishweshwar's wife
- Chandni Saha as Rema Chatterjee - Rehan's ex-fiancée; Sanjoy's wife
- Bhaswar Chatterjee as Sanjoy Chatterjee aka Sanju - A teacher,‌ Sarbeshwar's son; Rob, Rudrani and Rehan's elder brother; Rema's husband
- Jayashree Mukherjee Kaul as Jayashree
- Roshni Ghosh as Dustu
- Payel Tarafdar as Sristi
- Aarijit Dhibar as Rob Chatterjee - Sarbeshwar's younger son; Utsha's husband; Sanjoy, Rudrani and Rehan's younger brother
- Mimi Dutta as Utsha Chatterjee - Rob's wife; Sarbeshwar's younger daughter-in-law
- Susmita Roy Chakraborty as Susmita
- Sayantani Majumder as Sayantani
- Debarshi Banerjee as Debarshi
- Sourav Banerjee as Makhon Lal Poddar / M.K Poddar - A trustworthy employee of chatterjee group
- Gourab Ghoshal as Kalicharan Das aka Kolke - A local goon of D.S colony
- Arindol Bagchi as Manager Babu of municipality corporation
- Subhajit Banerjee as Bipin Majhi - A police inspector who worked for chatterjee group
- Payel Sarkar as Deepika - Sanjoy's student
- Shobhana Bhunia as Shobhana - Sanjoy's student
- Brinda Mukherjee as Brinda - Sanjoy's student
- Shubhojit Bakshi as Photik Basu - A lawyer.
- Maahi Kar as Payel Deb - Rob's lover, Employee of Chatterjee group.
- Subhankar Saha as Alankar - Rudrani's lover.
- Sahamita Acharya as Anindita Sarkar - a Journalist, Jogomaya's Friend.
- Niladri Lahiri as Rema's father.
- Arun Saha as Subrata Bhattacharya - Employee of Chatterjee group.
- Kalyani Mondal as Gayatri Roy - Rajeshwar's friend, A political leader.
- Rupsa Chatterjee as Dr. Oishani Mukherjee - Jogomaya's rescuer and well wisher.
- Nisha Poddar as Arna Mukherjee - Oishani's sister.
- Pallab Chakraborty as Gourav Roy - Gayatri's grandson.
