= Tiyasha Lepcha =

Indian Bengali television actress

- Born: Tiyasha Lepcha; 16 August 1999 (age 26)
- Citizenship: Indian
- Occupation: Actress
- Notable work: Krishnakoli (2018); Roshnai (2024)
- Spouse: Suban Roy (m. 2018; div. 2022)

Tiyasha Lepcha (born 16 August 1999) is a Bengali Indian television actress. She is known for portraying the role of Shyama in the Bengali television series Krishnakoli and the titular role of in the Star Jalsha television drama series Roshnai.

== Career ==
Tiyasha started her career in television as a lead actress. In 2018, she started acting in Bengali television series Krishnakoli. The series aired on Zee Bangla and it completed 1202 episodes.

== Personal life ==
Tiyasha was married to Suban Roy from 2018 to 2022.

== Television ==
Year	Title	Role	Language	Channel	Production company(s)	Ref.
2018–2022	Krishnakoli	Shyama Chowdhury	Bengali	Zee Bangla	Tent Cinema	
2022–2023	Bangla Medium	Indira Sarkar Chatterjee	Bengali	Star Jalsha	Tent Cinema	
2024	Ramprasad	Rani Bhavani	Bengali	Star Jalsha	Surinder Films	
2024–2025	Roshnai	Roshnai Ganguly	Bengali	Star Jalsha	Magic Moments Motion Pictures	
2025–present	Anurager Chhowa (Season 2)	Poroma	Bengali	Star Jalsha	Shree Venkatesh Films	
2018	Shaktirupeno	Debi Rankini Kali	Bengali	Zee Bangla		
2019	12 Maashe 12 Rupe Debiboron	Debi Sankatnashini	Bengali	Zee Bangla		
2020	Durga Soptosoti Sambhavami Yuge Yuge	Debi Roktodontika	Bengali	Zee Bangla		
2021	Nanarupe Mahamaya	Debi Kaushiki	Bengali	Zee Bangla		
2022	Ya Chandi	Debi Kaushiki	Bengali	Star Jalsha		
2019	Dadagiri	Contestant	Bengali	Zee Bangla		
2020	Didi No 1	Contestant	Bengali	Zee Bangla		
2022	Rannaghor	Host	Bengali	Zee Bangla		

== Awards ==
Year	Award	Category	Name	Ref.
2019	Zee Bangla Sonar Sansar Awards 2019	Sera Juti	Shyama-Nikhil	
2019	Zee Bangla Sonar Sansar Awards 2019	Sera Bou	Shyama	
2019	Tele Academy Awards	Best Couple	As Shyama in Krishnakoli	
2020	ZBFG Award	Favorite Actress (Zee Bangla Fanbase category)	Krishnakoli	
2020	Zee Bangla Sonar Sansar Awards 2020	Sera Juti	Shyama-Nikhil	
2021	Zee Bangla Sonar Sansar Awards 2021	Sera Bouma	Shyama	
2021	Zee Bangla Sonar Sansar Awards 2021	Sera Juti	Shyama-Nikhil	
2022	Zee Bangla Sonar Sansar Awards 2022	Sonar Sodosso	Shyama	
2023	Tele Academy Awards 2023	Sera Juti	Indira-Bikram	
2025	Tele Academy Awards 2025	Best Actress	Roshnai	
2025	Tele Academy Awards 2025	Priyo Bon	Poroma	
