= Rita Koiral =

Indian actress (born 1959)

- Born: July 3, 1959; Kolkata, West Bengal, India
- Died: November 19, 2017 (aged 58); Kolkata, West Bengal, India
- Occupation: Actress
- Relatives: Jahar Ganguly (maternal grandfather)

Rita Koiral or Rita Kayral (3 July 1959 – 19 November 2017) was an Indian Bengali actress, known for her television and film roles. She appeared in several soap opera roles, often as villains and often opposite Monami Ghosh. Directors she worked with included Prabhat Roy, Agnidev Chatterjee and Aparna Sen. She also acted in jatra (a form of folk theatre). Koiral was born in Kolkata, and was still living there at the time of her death. She obtained a B.Com and an M.Com in Accountancy from Calcutta University. Later she joined Durdarshan Kendra Calcutta as its newsreader.

Her first marriage was with fellow Bengali actor Soumitra Banerjee. Famous actor Jahar Ganguly was her maternal grandfather. She was estranged from her second husband, by whom she had one daughter named Amrita. She also had one son who died at an early age.

== Career ==
In Rituparno Ghosh's 2000 film Bariwali, Rita Koiral provided the voice for another Indian actress, Kirron Kher, the producer's wife, but she was not given the credit when Kher received a National Award for her role in the film. According to the rules, Kher should not have qualified for the award because the role was dubbed. Koiral claimed that Anupam Kher had offered her a share of the award money, but Kirron Kher denied that her part had been overdubbed. Following Koiral's death, The Times of India claimed that she "nursed the wound of being denied her due credit" for the rest of her life.

In addition to acting, Koiral ran a school of dance. She continued to act after being diagnosed with liver cancer, and died in hospital in Kolkata, aged 58.

== Filmography ==
Year	Title
1995	Daughters of This Century
1996	Atmaja
1999	Asukh
1999	Gunda
1999	Jiban Niye Khela
1999	Khelaghar
2000	Paromitar Ek Din
2005	Rajmohol
2008	Bor Asbe Ekhuni
2008	Chirodini Tumi Je Amar
2011	Mon Bole Priya Priya
2012	Dutta Vs Dutta
2013	Ganesh Talkies
2014	Window Connection
	Boro Bou

== Television ==
- Rakhi Bandhan as Malina Chatterjee (later replaced by Chaitali Chakraborty)
- Saat Paake Bandha as Charu
- Ek Akasher Niche(2000-2005) (Zee Bangla)
- Shyaola
- Kon Se Alor Swapno Niye
- Sholo Aana
- Binni Dhaner Khoi
- Sonar Horin
- Swade Ahladey
- Stree as Sabitri Ghosh
- Mouchaak as Paroma sen
- Ishti Kutum as Kumudini
- Janani as Supriya Devi's (Janani) second daughter, and Partha Mukhopadhyay's wife
