= John Bhattacharya =

Indian model and actor

- Born: Shaurja Bhattacharya; 24 June 1994 (age 31); Kolkata, West Bengal, India
- Occupations: Actor, model
- Years active: 2013–present
- Known for: Bojhena Se Bojhena; Rimli; Mithai
- Relatives: Samm Bhattacharya (brother)

John Bhattacharya also known as Shaurja Bhattacharya (born 24 June 1994) is an Indian model and actor, who works in Bengali film and television industry.

== Career ==
Bhattacharya started his career with the Bengali television series Bojhena Se Bojhena. Apart from Bojhena Se Bojhena he has worked in many television serial such as Thik Jeno Love Story and Nojor. In 2021 he made his film debut with the film Golondaaj.

== Filmography ==
=== Films ===
- Golondaaj (2021)
- Pradhan (2023)
- Khadaan (2024)
- Jhumur (2025)
- Lokkhikantopur Local (2025)
- Hok Kolorob (2026)

=== Television ===
Year	Serial	Character	Channel	Language	Production House	Notes	References
2013-2016	Bojhena Se Bojhena	Hariharan Singh aka Harry	Star Jalsha	Bengali	Shree Venkatesh Films	Supporting role	
2014-2015	Thik Jeno Love Story	Rohit	Star Jalsha	Bengali	Shree Venkatesh Films	Supporting role	
2016-2017	Nagleela	Raja Ishaan	Colors Bangla	Bengali	Shree Venkatesh Films	Lead role	
2017-2018	Mayar Badhon	Aryan Singha Roy	Star Jalsha	Bengali	Surinder Films	2nd Male Lead	
2019	Nojor	Ayush Singha Roy	Star Jalsha	Bengali	Surinder Films	Lead role	
2021	Rimli	Uday Mukherjee	Zee Bangla	Bengali	Acropoliis Entertainment	Lead role	
2022	Mithai	Omi Agarwal	Zee Bangla	Bengali	Zee Bangla Production	Lead antagonist	
2022-2023	Alor Theekana	Abhi	Sun Bangla	Bengali	Surinder Films	Lead	

=== Music videos ===
Year	Video	Singer(s)	Composer(s)	Co-actor(s)	Language	Music label	References
2018	Mitthey Kotha	Anupam Roy	Anupam Roy	Sanjana Banerjee	Bengali	SVF Music	
2020	Bolo Dugga Maiki	Nakash Aziz, Nikhita Gandhi	Jeet Gannguli	Sanjana Banerjee	Bengali	SVF Music	
2021	Konya	Ash King, Guddu	Kaushik and Guddu	Shreyasi Sen	Bengali	SVF Music	
