= Ami, Yasin Ar Amar Madhubala =

- Poster
- Directed by: Buddhadev Dasgupta
- Written by: Buddhadev Dasgupta
- Produced by: Anurradha Prasad; Shanjiv Shankar Prasad
- Starring: Prosenjit Chatterjee; Amitabh Bhattacharjee; Sameera Reddy
- Cinematography: Sunny Joseph
- Edited by: Amitava Dasgupta
- Music by: Biswadep Dasgupta
- Release date: 10 September 2007 (Toronto International Film Festival)
- Running time: 115 minutes
- Country: India
- Language: Bengali

Ami, Yasin Ar Amar Madhubala ('Me, Yasin and my honeymoon') is a 2007 Indian Bengali-language crime drama film directed and written by Buddhadev Dasgupta. The film's title is a reference to actress Madhubala. It was screened at the Toronto International Film Festival. The film is based on a true story.

== Plot ==
When a Kolkata surveillance specialist and his roommate install a small camera in the home of their beautiful neighbor, they somehow become terror suspects in director Buddhadeb Dasgupta's cutting commentary on CCTV society. Yasin (Amitav Bhattacharya) and his roommate Dilip (Prosenjit Chatterjee) are smitten with their beautiful new neighbor Rekha (Sameera Reddy). Innocent pining becomes silent obsession, and Dilip decides to install a surveillance camera directly over Rekha's bed. At first Rekha remains blissfully unaware that her privacy has been invaded, but when she finally realizes she's being spied on, her nosy neighbors are forced to go on the run. Little do Yasin and Dilip realize that across town a terrorist cell is plotting their latest attack, and now the local authorities believe that Yasin may be a key part of their diabolical plans.

== Cast ==
- Amitav Bhattacharya as Yasin
- Prasenjit Chatterjee as Dilip
- Sameera Reddy as Rekha

== Reception ==
The film was released in Toronto, Canada, as The Voyeurs.

Writing for Variety, film critic Robert Koehler said:

The Voyeurs leads to conclusions best left unrevealed, but the way Dasgupta is able to shift from lighthearted reflection, magic realism and a man’s seemingly absurd pursuit of love to personal and social catastrophe — not unlike many of his previous films, including the superb Chased By Dreams — is an assured example of storytelling artistry.
