= Raasta (2003 film) =

Rasta রাস্তা
- DVD Cover
- Directed by: Bratya Basu
- Written by: Bratya Basu
- Produced by: Sri Prokash Chowdhury
- Starring: Mithun Chakraborty; Rajatava Dutta; Amitabh Bhattacharjee; Rimjhim Gupta; Raghuvir Yadav; Alakananda Ray; Dolon Ray; Soma Dey; Alaka Gangopadhyay; Deb Shankar Halder
- Music by: Tapan; Nawab Arzoo (lyrics)
- Distributed by: Jeetz Filmworks; Grassroot Entertainment
- Release date: 2 October 2003
- Running time: 125 min.
- Country: India
- Language: Bengali

Rasta (transl. The Road) is a 2003 Indian Bengali-language action thriller film written and directed by Bratya Basu. It is a revenge thriller drama, consisting of crimes in the roads of Kolkata, related to a drug syndicate supported by a corrupt politician. Indian footballer Surajit Sengupta played in the film as guest actor.

== Plot ==
A fast-paced thriller, with Mithun providing the twist as a corrupted politician.

== Cast ==
- Mithun Chakraborty as a corrupt minister Jagannath Halder
- Rajatava Dutta as Santosh Banerjee alias Bhai Da
- Amitabh Bhattacharjee as Neel Sengupta
- Raghuvir Yadav as Neel's friend Taal Da
- Rimjhim Gupta as Neel's love interest
- Surajit Sengupta as Khalifa
- Debshankar Haldar as ACP Debashish Sinha
- Anamitra Saha as Bhai Da's son
- Dolon Roy
- Manasi Sinha
- Alakananda Ray
- Soma Dey
- Alaka Gangopadhyay
- Supriyo Dutta as Bhai Da's henchman
