= Moumita Gupta =

Indian film and television actress

- Occupations: Actress; Politician
- Political party: Bharatiya Janata Party (2019–present)
- Children: Rimjhim Gupta and Ved Chatterjee

Moumita Gupta is an Indian actress and politician who works primarily in the Bengali cinema and television. She has played prominent characters in Bengali television shows like Bou Kotha Kao, Bhanumotir Khel etc.

== Personal life ==
She is the mother of actress Rimjhim Gupta and Ved Chatterjee.

== Political career ==
She joined Bharatiya Janata Party in 2019.

== Works ==
=== Films ===
- Ebong Kiriti (2017)
- Bhroon (Unreleased)
- Mone Pore Aajo Seidin (2011)
- Bhumiputra (2006)
- Je Jon Thake Majhkhane (2006)
- Nagardola (2005)
- Ek Mutho Chhabi (2005)
- Moner Majhe Tumi (2003)
- Shakti (2004)
- Shubho Mahurat (2003)
- Annadaata (2002)
- Santan (1999 film)

=== Television ===
- Checkmate as Supti Roy Burman (2012)
- Ek akasher niche as Indra's Mother (2000-2005)
- Ekdin Pratidin as Abhimanyu's mother (2005-2007)
- Raat Bhor Brishti as Srimati Sen
- Khela as Aapa (2006-2008)
- Rajpath as Rama Sen (2008-2009)
- Erao Shotru as Seema Mukherjee (2006-2011)
- Bou Kotha Kao as Neelima (2009-2012)
- Saat Paake Bandha as Domoyonti Sen (2010-2013)
- @Bhalobasha.com as Rajlekha Chowdhury
- Aanchol as Aditi Roy (later replaced by Swagata Mukherjee)
- Sokhi as Charu Roy
- Kiranmala as Raaj Mata (2014-2016)
- Aaj Aari Kal Bhab as Brinda Ganguly
- Goyenda Ginni as Neelima Banerjee
- Pita as Goirika Sen
- Stree as Shakuntala Deb (2016-2018)
- Adorini as Trisha Sen
- Bhanumotir Khel as Amba Sarkar (2018-2019)
- Kora Pakhi as Radharani Banerjee (2020-2021)
- Mohor as Malobika Roy Choudhury (2019-2022)
- Sarbojoya as Madhuraa Chowdhury (2021-2022)
- Jagaddhatri as Boidehi Mukherjee (2022–Present)
- Mukut as Rubi Banerjee (2023)

== Awards ==
Year	Award	Category	Character	Film/TV show
2025	Zee Bangla Sonar Sansar Awards 2025	Priyo Sashuri	Boidehi Mukherjee	Jagaddhatri

== See also ==
- Locket Chatterjee
- Debolina Dutta
- Kanchana Moitra
- Laboni Sarkar
