= Soma Banerjee =

Bengali film and television actress

- Born: 1962 (age 63–64); Kolkata
- Citizenship: Indian
- Occupation: Actress
- Notable work: Aparajita Apu; Uma; Mittir Bari

Soma Banerjee is an Indian film and television actress, who predominantly works in Bengali cinema and serials. She made her debut in DD Bangla's serial Janmobhumi and became popular with the role of Heera Amma in Star Jalsha's Maa....Tomay Chara Ghum Ashena serial. She has acted in many serials including Bhojo Gobindho, Aparajita Apu and Uma.

After 30 years of acting in a supporting roles, negative roles, she made her debut as a lead in 2026 in Zee Bangla's Annapurnar Lokkhira as Annapurna

== Works ==
=== Films ===
- Bandhu (2007)
- Nobel Chor (2012)
- Chirodini Tumi Je Amar 2 (2014) as Jyoti's mother
- Bindaas (2014) as Sukhdeb's wife
- Arundhati (2014) as Annada Maa
- Naqaab (2018)
- Bramha Janen Gopon Kommotias Amrabati (2020)

=== Television ===
Year	Serial	Role	Language	Channel
1996–2002	Janmobhumi	Pori	Bengali	DD Bangla
2000–2005	Ek Akasher Niche	Manashi	Bengali	Zee Bangla
2009–2014	Maa....Tomay Chara Ghum Ashena	Heera Amma	Bengali	Star Jalsha
2011–2012	Kanakanjali	Purobi	Bengali	Zee Bangla
2011–2013	Keya Patar Nouko	Firoza	Bengali	Zee Bangla
2012	Checkmate	Anjalimashi	Bengali	Star Jalsha
2014–2016	Chokher Tara Tui	Rajlakshmi	Bengali	Star Jalsha
2015–2016	Kojagori	Noori	Bengali	Zee Bangla
2015–2017	Punyi Pukur	Hoimonti Mukherjee	Bengali	Star Jalsha
2016	Bhalobasha Bhalobasha	Manda	Bengali	Colors Bangla
2016	Jhanjh Lobongo Phool	Brihospoti	Bengali	Star Jalsha
2016–2017	Bhootu	Guruma	Bengali	Zee Bangla
2016-2017	Jarowar Jhumko	Beeru's mother	Bengali	Zee Bangla
2017–2018	Bhojo Gobindo	Sandya Sen, Gobindo's mother	Bengali	Star Jalsha
2018-2020	Hriday Haran B.A. Pass	Sid's mother	Bengali	Zee Bangla
2019–2020	Koler Bou	Deep's mother	Bengali	Star Jalsha
2019–2020	Kanak Kakon	Akash's mother	Bengali	Colors Bangla
2020–2021	Alo Chhaya	Sashikala Devi	Bengali	Zee Bangla
2020–2022	Aparajita Apu	Abala Mukherjee	Bengali	Zee Bangla
2021–2022	Uma	Sutapa Das	Bengali	Zee Bangla
2022–2023	Indrani	Mitali, Indrani's mother-in-law	Bengali	Colors Bangla
2022–2025	Horogouri Pice Hotel	Mitali's mother	Bengali	Star Jalsha
2023–2024	Icche Putul	Madhumita	Bengali	Zee Bangla
2023–2024	Kar Kachhe Koi Moner Kotha	Bipasha's mother-in-law	Bengali	Zee Bangla
2023–2024	Mili	Mili's care-taker, Sabitri aka Boya	Bengali	Zee Bangla
2024	Mongolmoyee Maa Shitala	Daima	Bengali	Sun Bangla
2024	Tumi Ashe Pashe Thakle	Shaborni	Bengali	Star Jalsha
2024–2025	Malabodol	Kabyo's mother	Bengali	Zee Bangla
2025	Mittir Bari	Minu	Bengali	Zee Bangla
2025	Phulki	Damayanti Kar aka Taiji	Bengali	Zee Bangla
2025	Amader Dadamoni	Kalyani	Bengali	Zee Bangla
2025–2026	Brindaban Bilashini	Mohini Maa	Bengali	Sun Bangla
2026-Present	Annapurnar Lokkhira	Annapurna	Bengali	Zee Bangla

== Awards ==
Year	Award	Category	Character	Serial
2022	Zee Bangla Sonar Sansar Award 2022	Priyo Sashuri	Abala Mukherjee	Aparajita Apu
2026	Zee Bangla Sonar Sansar Award 2026	Sonar Somporko	Annapurna	Annapurnar Lokkhira
