= Sedin Dujone =

- Directed by: Atanu Basu
- Written by: Atanu Basu
- Starring: Amitava Bhattacharya; Kasturi
- Cinematography: Utpal Chakraborty
- Edited by: Uttam Roy
- Music by: Chandan Raychowdhury
- Release date: 30 May 2008
- Running time: 160 minutes
- Country: India
- Language: Bengali

Sedin Dujone (Bengali: সেদিন দুজনে) is a 2008 Bengali film directed by debutant director Atanu Basu and released in 2008 featuring Amitava Bhattacharya and Kasturi. The film is almost directly from Priyadarshan who directed Kyon Ki released in 2005, which was not an original storyline either. It was a variation on the famous Suchitra Sen-film Deep Jele Jai. This was later made into Hindi as Khamoshi, produced by Hemant Kumar and starring Waheeda Rehman. But like most of his peers, Bose does not credit his source.

== Plot ==
The focus is on hero Raj (Amitabh Bhattacharya) and not so much on the two heroines Maria (Kasturi) and Sanchita (Kanchana Moitra). Raj is a famous singer when the film opens. He falls in love with Maria, a Catholic nun-to-be and the two are engaged. Just before they tie the knot, Raj's friend Suman steps in stealthily with the intention of raping her. Maria jumps to her death and Raj loses his sanity.

The post-interval phase of the mental care home begins the second part of the story where the home's dictatorial proprietor's daughter Sanchita cures Raj. They fall in love and the two could have walked into the sunset with a good end to the film. But the director had other plans and his debut goes almost the Kyon Ki way.

== Cast ==
- Amitava Bhattacharya – Raj
- Kasturi – Maria
- Kanchana Moitra – Sanchita
- Diganta Bagchi – Suman
- Biplab Chattopadhyay – Dr. Roy
- Monu Mukherjee – Kaka
- Kunal Mitra – Bijay
- Partha Sarathi Deb
- Manoj Mitra
