= Deb Chowdhury =

Indian singer, lyricist, composer, cultural activist, researcher and television anchor

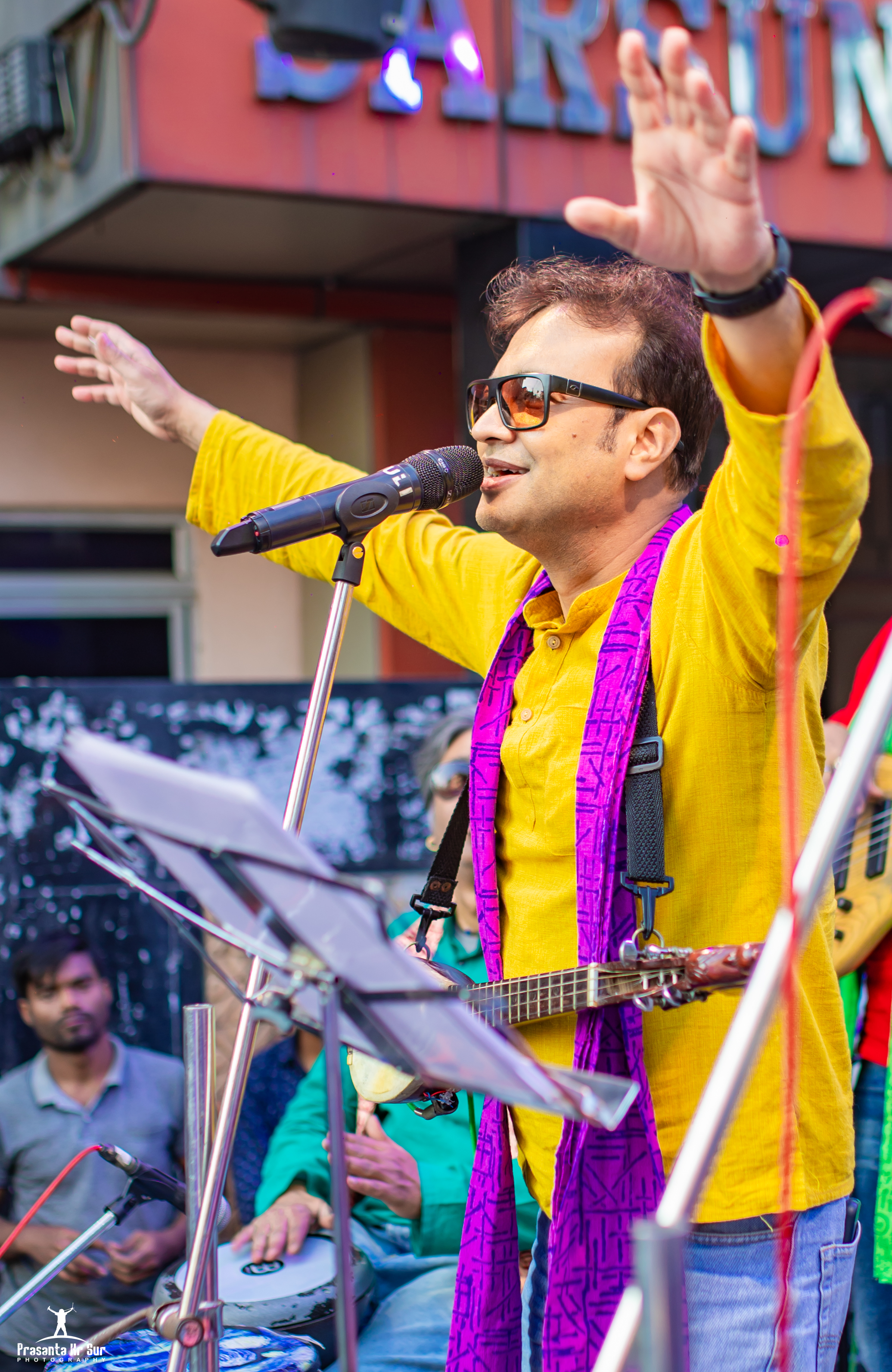
Deb Chowdhury concert photo

Deb Chowdhury is an Indian singer, lyricist, composer, cultural activist, researcher and television anchor. Folk music is his primary choice of genre. He is working for the Indigenous Art & Culture of India for the last 25 years. He also is a documentary film maker. He is the founder-director of Sahajiya Foundation, working for promotion and exploration of different Indian folk songs. He is the only disciple of late Kalachand Darbesh, the last Darbesh of Bengal. He is also associated with various social development, environment awareness & conservation projects.

== Early life ==
Deb was born in Kolkata, West Bengal. He graduated from Dinabandhu Andrews College, under University of Calcutta. His mother Shipra Chowdhury was a school teacher and father Manil Chowdhury is a former football player who played First Division in Kolkata Football leagues. He got his primary music lessons from his uncle late Pundit Chuni Lal Chowdhury. He considers Goutam Chattopadhyay as his first Guru, Guide and Philosopher.

== Career ==
He is an exponent of Folk songs of Bengal, He is the founder of popular band of India, Sahajiya Folk Band. He scored many Feature Films, Telefilms and Theatre projects as a music director. His only released Bengali album as a lyricist & composer so far, ‘Tomake Ektu’ from His Master's Voice, sung by singer Ritika Sahani. He is a mentor and Music designer of Folk Genre in Sa Re Ga Ma Pa (Zee Bangla), a musical program in Bengali Television. He is a regular Anchor in Good Morning Akash (Aakash 8), a live musical show in Bengali Television.
