= Krishnakoli =

2018 Indian Bengali TV series

- Also known as: Krishnokoli
- Genre: Soap opera
- Created by: Tent Cinema
- Written by: Dialogues; Ayan Chakraborty
- Screenplay by: Nandalal Majumdar
- Story by: Susanta Das; Sayantani Bhattacharya
- Directed by: Bijoy Maji
- Creative directors: Susanta Das; Sayantani Bhattacharya
- Starring: Tiyasha Lepcha; Neel Bhattacharya; Rimjhim Mitra; Soume Chatterjee; Raunak Dey Bhowmik; Vivaan Ghosh; Adhiraj Ganguly
- Theme music composer: Debjit Roy; Aditi Munshi
- Opening theme: "Krishnakoli Ami Tarei Boli"
- Composer: Upaali Chatterjee
- Country of origin: India
- Original language: Bengali
- No. of episodes: 1202

Production
- Executive producers: Sanjukta Chakraborty (Tent Cinema); Paromita, Urbish Bose (Zee Bangla)
- Producer: Susanta Das
- Production location: Kolkata
- Cinematography: Sankalpa Dasgupta
- Editors: Amitava Bagchi; Shekhar Ghosh
- Running time: 22 minutes
- Production company: Tent Cinema

Original release
- Network: Zee Bangla
- Release: 5 April 2018 – 9 January 2022

Krishnakoli is a 2018 Bengali language television soap opera that premiered from 5 April 2018 and aired on Zee Bangla. One of the longest running Bengali television soap opera, the series is produced by Susanta Das of Tent Cinema and stars Tiyasha Lepcha and Neel Bhattacharya in the lead roles. After 3 years, the show went ended on 9 January 2022 to make way for Pilu.

== Plot ==
The story revolves around Shyama, a dark-skinned girl, who sets out to remove stigma attached to colour. She marries Nikhil and faces discrimination due to her complexion. A talented singer, she sets out on a journey to create an identity for herself. Shyama believes that her complexion is akin to that of Lord Krishna's. Her life changes after marriage when she goes on to make a career in music. Shyama's mother-in-law dislikes her but later in few years of time she becomes more of a daughter and allows her to sing. Then, Shyama takes part in music competition where Ashok, her brother-in-law, plans to kill her but she managed to escape. Then, she fell in a river and got missing while escaping.

Nikhil discovers a girl looking similar to Shyama named Amropali. After that she married Nikhil. But after some months of their marriage, Shyama returned with help of her cousin-in-law Aditya and exposed Disha-Ashok and sent them to jail. Then, Amropali become jealous and planned to kill pregnant Shyama by kidnapping. But luckily while travelling Shyama accidentally fell on a truck and went to Benaras and there Shyama gave birth a baby girl namely Krishna while Ashok mistook Amropali to be Shyama and killed her.

Shyama and her daughter Krishna stay in Benaras but Shyama has lost her memory so she doesn't remember her past. Then Nikhil and his family went to Banaras and met Krishna. Later, Nikhil and his family find out that Krishna's mother is Shyama. Ashok return from jail as pretending to be good and later he planned and killed his father with help of Shiva who was later revealed to be Shyama and Nikhil's son. Later, Ashok was jailed. Dodo returns from foreign with his lover Shina who came to take revenge from Shyama.

== Cast ==
=== Main ===
- Tiyasha Lepcha in as
  - Shyama Choudhury: Nikhil's first wife; Krishna and Shiva's mother; Aniruddha's mother-in-law
  - Amrapali "Maam": Nikhil's second wife (2020)
- Neel Bhattacharya as Nikhil Choudhury: Shyama's husband; Amrapali's widower; Krishna and Shiva's father; Aniruddha's father-in-law
- Soume Chatterjee as Krishna Dutta (née Choudhury): Shyama and Nikhil's daughter; Shiva's sister; Aniruddha's wife
- Raunak Dey Bhowmick as Aniruddha "Ani" Dutta: Kanika's son; Krishna's husband
- Adhiraj Ganguly as Shiva Choudhury: Shyama and Nikhil's son; Krishna's brother

=== Recurring ===
- Nibedita Mukherjee as Sujata Choudhury: Arun, Ashok and Nikhil's mother
- Shankar Chakraborty as Basanta Choudhury: Sujata's husband; Arun, Ashok and Nikhil's father
- Sanjib Sarkar as Krishnacharan: Shyama's father
- Mou Bhattacharya as Bishnupriya: Shyama's mother
- Koushik Bhattacharya as Arun Choudhury: Nikhil's brother; Basanta and Sujata's son; Papiya's husband; Dodo and Tatan's father
- Priyanka Halder as Papiya Choudhury: Arun's wife; Dodo and Tatan's mother
- Rimjhim Mitra as Disha Choudhury: Ashok's wife; Munni's mother
- Vivaan Ghosh as Ashok Choudhury: Nikhil's brother; Basanta and Sujata's son; Disha's husband; Munni's father
- Ananya Guha as Srijani Choudhury aka Munni: Disha and Ashok's daughter; Aniruddha's one sided lover
- Mishmee Das as Sunaina: Amropali's cousin; Nikhil's lover
- Biresh Chakraborty as Kanai: Shyama's brother; Gopal's father
- Susmita Roy Chakroborty as Parvati: Kanai's wife; Shyama's sister-in-law; Gopal's mother
- Ayush Das as Gopal: Kanai and Parvati's son
- Sarbari Mukherjee as Rukmini: Sujata's sister; Radharani's mother; Shyama's guruma
- Sreemoyee Chattoraj as Radharani Dutta; Rukmini and Alok's daughter; Rai's mother; Aniruddha's aunt
- Sanjoy Basu as Alok: Rukmini's husband; Radharani's father; Shyama's guruji
- Purbasha Roy as Bijli: Housemaid of Choudhury family
- Arpita Mondal as Padma
- Prriyam Chakroborty as Tithi: Shyama's teacher; Disha's friend; Nikhil's love interest
- Pooja Karmakar as Priyanka Mukherjee: Nikhil's former fiancé
- Basudeb Mukherjee as Dadamoshai: Priest of Choudhury family
- Raj Bhattacharya as Romen Das: Shyama's enemy
- Rajib Bose as Aditya Choudhury: Nikhil's cousin brother; Radharani's former fiancé
- Reshmi Sen as Shatabdi Banerjee Das : Romen's mother
- Shobhana Bhunia as Tumpa: Bijli's sister
- Shatabdi Nag / Purbasha Debnath as Shraboni : A fake Nurse who wants to kill Shyama, Nikhil's love interest
- Kushal Chakraborty as Amropali's father
- Riyanka Dasgupta as Amropali's maternal aunt
- Piyali Basu as Gouri Das: Romen's wife
- Fahim Mirza as Rony: Amropali's love interest
- Soumi Paul as Madhumita Sengupta
- Swagata Mukherjee / Nandini Dutta as Rai Dutta: Radharani's daughter; Aniruddha's cousin sister
- Avery Singha Roy as Kanika Dutta: Radharani's sister-in-law; Aniruddha's mother
- Ranit Modak as Montu Palit
- Ashmita Baidya as Roshni: Nikhil's love interest; Amarendra's daughter
- Arindam Banerjee as Amarendra Chakraborty: Roshni's father
- Payel Dutta as Michri: Nikhil's caretaker
- Swarnadipto Ghosh in double role
  - Dwaipayan Chowdhury aka Dodo: Arun and Papiya's son, Tatan's brother, Shinjini's fiancé
  - Sampayan Chowdhury aka Tatan: Arun and Papiya's son, Dodo's brother, Shinjini's husband
- Dia Karmakar as Shinjini Chowdhury (née Das) aka Shina: Dodo's former lover; Tatan's wife; Romen and Gouri's daughter
- Indrajit Mazumder as Anik: Nikhil's friend; Shiva's Advocate

== Adaptations ==
Language	Title	Original release	Network(s)	Last aired	Notes
Bengali	Krishnakoli কৃষ্ণকলি	18 June 2018	Zee Bangla	9 January 2022	Original
Telugu	Krishna Tulasi కృష్ణ తులసి	22 February 2021	Zee Telugu	26 November 2022	Remake
Bhojpuri	Shyam Tulasi श्याम तुलसी	20 September 2021	Zee Ganga	29 July 2022	Remake
Tamil	Karthigai Deepam கார்த்திகை தீபம்	5 December 2022	Zee Tamil	Ongoing	Remake
Malayalam	Shyamambaram ശ്യാമാംബരം	6 February 2023	Zee Keralam	29 September 2024	Remake
Marathi	Savlyachi Janu Savali सावळ्याची जणू सावली	23 September 2024	Zee Marathi	Ongoing	Remake
