= Checkmate (Indian TV series) =

2012 Indian Bengali television series

- Genre: Thriller
- Created by: Ravi Ojha
- Story by: Mitali Bhattacharya; Dialogues; Sharmila Mukherjee
- Directed by: Biswajit Ganguly; Rabindra Geeta Nambiar
- Starring: Aparajita Ghosh Das; Amitabh Bhattacharjee; Riju Biswas in a special appearance
- Country of origin: India
- Original language: Bengali
- No. of episodes: 46

Production
- Producer: Ravi Ojha
- Production locations: Kolkata, West Bengal, India
- Camera setup: Multi-camera
- Running time: 45 minutes
- Production company: Ravi Ojha Productions

Original release
- Network: Star Jalsha
- Release: 21 January – 15 July 2012

Checkmate is an Indian Bengali television thriller series which aired on Star Jalsha from 21 January 2012 to 15 June 2012.

== Plot ==
The show is a thriller with the protagonist, detective Mrinalini Dastidar (played by Aparajita Ghosh Das). She, along with her associates, solve mysteries.

== Cast ==
- Saurabh Chatterjee as Amolendu Dostidar
- Aparajita Ghosh Das as Detective Mrinalini Dostidar
- Amitabh Bhattacharjee as Aditya Sen
- Suchismita Chowdhury as Aporna
- Rupa Bhattacharjee as ACP Sreeja Sen
- Rimjhim Mitra as ACP Sreeja Sen
- Rajanya Mitra as Esha
- Indrani Basu as Mira
- Kaushik Bhattacharya as Hirok
- Somjita Bhattacharya as Madhuja's Friend
- Jayanta Dutta Burman as Derek
- Anindya Chakraborty as Kaushik Mukherjee
- Soma Banerjee as Anjalimashi
- Saheb Chatterjee as Rohit (Goenda Keutey)
- Swaralipi Chatterjee as Ritu
- Biplab Dasgupta as OC Dutta
- Gautam Dey as Adheer Sinha
- Kaushik Ghosh as Amit Lahiri
- Rajesh Kr Chattopadhyay as Sanjoy
- Ratna Ghoshal as Sanjoy's Mother
- Jagannath as Amitabha Choudhury
- Ekavali Khanna as Avantika (2 episodes, 2012)
- Anusuya Majumdar as Julia Aunty
- Samrat Mukherji as Barun Sen
- Sudip Mukherjee as Neel Roy Burman
- Pushpita Mukherjee as Protima
- Saptarshi Ray as Akash
- Sayantani Sengupta as Anita
- Soumyo as Joy
- Zoyeb as Imon
- Aparna as Ela
- Arindoi Bagchi as Jahor
- Diganta Bagchi as Partho
- Anindya Banerjee as Aniruddho Ghosh (Public Prosecutor)
- Joyjit Banerjee as Shyam
- Kamalika Banerjee as Dr. Bonolota Dutta
- Runa Banerjee as Lalita Sen
- Suman Bannerjee as bhoy
- Arghya Basu as Anirban
- Damini Basu as Shiuli
- Tulika Basu as Kasturi Samonto
- Dipanjan Bhattacharya as Sumit Sanyal
- Joy Bhattacharyya as Bibek
- Titas Bhowmik as Rojoni
- Riju Biswas as Suresh Bagh
- Abhrajit Chakraborty as Shekhar Dasgupta
- Arun Chakraborty as Mike
- Bobby Chakraborty as Ranodeb Burman
- Kaushik Chakraborty as Gautam
- Kushal Chakraborty as Aniruddho Bose
- Subhadra Chakraborty as Madhobi
- Aditi Chatterjee as Shompa Dasgupta
- Bhaswar Chatterjee as Promit Guha
- Debjani Chattopadhyay as Dolon
- Mita Chatterjee as Shushiladebi
- Shubhomoy Chatterjee as Manohor
- Sonali Chowdhury as Ilina Chakraborty
- Dwaipayan Das as Arpan Dutta
- Manali Dey as Gouri
- Debjani Deb as Jonaki
- Pradip Dhar as Prottoy Biswas a.k.a. Potka
- Debolina Dutta as Advocate Ahona Ghosh
- Joymala Ganguly as Nondini Sen
- Pijush Ganguly as Akhil
- Nandini Ghosal as Mrs. Sanyal
- Chandrayee Ghosh as Ananya
- Kaushik Ghosh as Amit Lahiri
- Pallavi Gogoi as Marathon Organizer
- Rupsha Guha as Urmi
- Moumita Gupta as Supti Roy Burman
- Dipanwita Hazari as Dr. Debika Sanyal
- Anindita Saha Kapileswari as Sharmila
- Tania Kar as Meghna
- Kalyani Mondal as Mrs. Bonik
- Baisakhi Marjit as Pishimoni
- Rana Mitra as Raju Das
- Rupanjana Mitra as Mohini
- Arpita Mukherjee as Kaushik Mukherjee's wife
- Mrinal Mukherjee as Dip Ganguly
- Neel Mukherjee as Sukanto Choudhury
- Sarbari Mukherjee as Pamela
- Swagata Mukherjee as Mrs. Bagchi
- Piyali Munshi as Indira
- Neel as Anchor Chonchol
- Komal Nishad Mitra as Ayesha
- Manoj Ojha as Shumanto
- Priyam as Indra
- Milon Roychoudhury as Broto
- Shagnik as Rupesh
- Shayanton as Pollob
- Arindam Sil as Mallar
- Lopamudra Sinha as Rupa
- Manasi Sinha as Nondona

== Crew ==
=== Direction ===
- Biswajit Ganguly
- Ravindra Geetha Nambiar
- Ratnodeep Ghosh
- Mandira Mitra
- Anindya Sarkar
- Romit Ojha

=== Creative Direction ===
- Mandira Mitra
- Mitali Bhattacharya

=== Script ===
- Moushumi Choudhury
- Sharmila Mukherjee
- Koli Mitra
- Shayon Choudhury
- Romit Ojha
- Saurabh Sengupta
- Angikar Choudhury
- Kunal Sengupta

=== Cinematography ===
- Rupanjan Pal
- Kiranmoy Bhuniya

=== Editing ===
- Debashish Bhattacharya
- Niladri Dutta

=== Art Direction ===
- Narendra Ojha

=== Sound Management ===
- Ranjan Pandey

=== Music Department ===
- Gaurab Chatterjee ... background score / title music composed
- Jina ... title music: sung
- Jojo ... title music: sung
- Chandan Raychowdhury ... musical director / title music composed
- Indra Roy ... background score
- Srijato ... title music composed
