= Jol Nupur =

Bengali television series

- Title Screen
- Genre: Drama; Romance; Comedy
- Created by: Magic Moments Motion Pictures
- Screenplay by: Leena Gangopadhyay
- Directed by: Saibal Banerjee; Diganta Sinha
- Creative director: Leena Gangopadhyay
- Presented by: Bright Advertising Pvt. Ltd.
- Starring: Lovely Maitra; Aparajita Adhya
- Opening theme: "Chhonde Baaje.. Jol Nupur" by Chorus
- Country of origin: India
- Original language: Bengali
- No. of seasons: 2
- No. of episodes: 901

Production
- Executive producers: Sumit Kumar Roy, Satyajit Chakraborty (Magic Moments Motion Pictures), Kastuvi Ghosh (Star Jalsha), Sriya Basu (Star Jalsha)
- Producer: Saibal Banerjee
- Production locations: Orissa; West Bengal
- Cinematography: Parmatma Yadav
- Editors: Sameer; Soumen
- Running time: 22 minutes
- Production company: Magic Moments Motion Pictures

Original release
- Network: Star Jalsha
- Release: 21 January 2013 – 5 December 2015

Jol Nupur is a Bengali television serial that aired on Star Jalsha by Magic Moments Motion Pictures. It stars Lovely Maitra, Souptik Chakraborty (later replaced by Fahim Mirza) and Aparajita Adhya in lead roles. Jol Nupur replaced Sansaar Sukher Hoy Romonir Guney from 21 January 2013. After running successfully for almost 3 years and airing 901 episodes, the show went off-air on 5 December 2015 to make way for Punyi Pukur.

This is the second serial in Star Jalsha by Magic Moments Motion Pictures and the third longest running among all the serials produced by Magic Moments Motion Pictures after Ishti Kutum and ETV Bangla's (now Colors Bangla) Binni Dhaner Khoi.

== Plot ==
The story revolves around Kajal, a girl from Orissa and an expert in the dance form Odissi, and a man from the city Arin Basu Mallick, named Neel. Neel is from a wealthy and established family and man of principles, while Kajal or Kaju is soft-hearted and strong character who believes in the basic virtues of life. The show is basically a love story of Kaju and Neel in the backdrop of the sea. The waves of the sea seem to wash away all differences in their culture and lifestyles and tie them in an internal union.

Kaju and Arin meet on the sea-beach when Arin went there on a holiday. Neel develops feelings for Kaju. When Neel and Kaju accidentally and unintentionally perform some of the Hindu marriage rituals, the pujaris of the Jagannath temple threat to turn Kaju into a Devdasi and so Kaju becomes forced to marry Neel.

When the two come to Kolkata, Neel's family members are not ready to accept Kaju and she has to face many hurdles, especially the ill-intended Bhumi, Neel's elder sister-in-law. But she also has some supportive people by her side – Neel's uncle, Chhoton, who is the third son of Purnendusekhar Basu Mallick, head of the family, Neel's aunt, Aparajita (also called Pari) who is a mental patient and a special child, Anjana, Neel's aunt aka Boro Maa. Pari also sings beautifully. Pari's music teacher and mentor is Amartya. However Neel's father Shubho has a cheap mentality and often humiliates everyone and supports wrong people. Neel's mother Srimoyee supports every wrong of Shubho

Eventually the family members accept Kaju and Kaju wins an Odissi dance competition, defeating Bhumi. But Bhumi is actually Kaju's cousin and Kaju is the daughter of the dance maestro Surjya Panigrahi, who is now dead. Kajal's mother, Urvashi and Bhumi's mother, Srishti Mukherjee, are sisters. The power hungry Srishti had succeeded in establishing herself as an Odissi dancer.

But soon circumstances demand Neel and Kaju to get divorced due to Arin's friend, Arshi, who in turn marries Neel. Kaju happens to leave the Basu Mallick house and seek refuge in the house of an old Odissi dancer. He is Surjya Panigrahi and Srishti had planned to kill him in order to emerge as an unparalleled dancer. So now, Kaju's birth details are unveiled. Kaju begins training in Odissi vigorously by her father and wins a national-level dance competition. On the other hand, Neel becomes physically weak and ill.

In the meantime, other affairs creep in – Pari wins a national-level singing competition with the help of Amartya, who had married her also. At the same time, both Neel's family and Kaju have to face various calamities due to the ill-intended Bhoomi and Arshi. Raghubir a criminal who tried to make Kaju a Dasi is often hired by the villains for immoral work. He mainly targets Kaju. Pari has to face major hurdles, as Amartya's sister-in-law was not ready to accept her. Due to certain calamities like Amartya falling sick and losing his voice, force Pari to earn money by singing following which she is blamed by Amartya's sister-in-law that Pari was a thief. Eventually she is proved wrong and her son, Judo, marries Neel's sister, Mimi.

Another character, Minu, enters at this point. She happened to be neighbour of the Basu Mallick family when the family used to live in the village. She stood by the side of the Basu Mallick family and helped them in their crisis and later married Chhoton, third son of Purnendusekhar.

Discrepancies creep in even in her married life, when it is revealed that Minu was a widow and this was her second marriage. But Chhoton stands by her side and helps her in every such incident. Even in some cases Kaju helps her and the Basu Mallick family. In spite of all these affairs, Kaju's love for Neel or Neel's love for Kaju has not come to an end. The soap explores their relationship.

However, Kaju faces many ups and downs in the Basu Mallick residence. Srishti eventually repents and gets forgiven after she goes through a deadly disease. After Lal's death, a devastated Bhumi blames herself. She regrets her misdeeds and reforms. Bhumi changes her attitude towards Kaju, leaving Arshi agitated. After Amartya's tragic death, the family changes their mindset. The family regrets for their behaviour towards Kaju and Pari and Shubho and Srimoyee start loving Kaju and Pari. Later, Arshi is pregnant with Neel's child and Bhumi marries Samrat, taking care of his children, Toppa and Thumri. Chhoton, after many struggles and taunts, becomes a professor of a college, leaving the family in joy. Kaju leaves Neel's home and insists to sign a legal notice of Kaju not staying with him. The family stops Kaju from leaving their house but Kaju leaves and Neel Arshi remarries, on Kaju's insistence.

5 years later

Kaju is now an established dancer worldwide and Arshi brings up Shankha, her son. On Parijat's birthday the family appreciates Arshi for being compassionate. Kaju returns to the Basu Mallick home after being successful as a famous dancer. The family appreciates Kaju for her success and Arshi changes her attitude towards Kaju and the family insists Kaju to forget the past and stay with them. The show ends on a happy note of Kaju's journey from being the disaster of the family to being the lovable member of the family, where the whole family is now supportive towards Kaju and Kaju stays back.

== Cast ==
Arundhati Maitra, Fahim Mirza and Aparajita Adhya as Kaju, Neel and Pari

=== Main ===
- Lovely Maitra as Shankhamala Panigrahi (formerly Basu Mallick) aka Kaju/Kajal – Neel's first wife, Surjya and Urvashi's daughter (2013 – 2015)
- Souptik Chakraborty / Fahim Mirza as Arin Basu Mallick aka Neel – Kajol's ex-husband; Arshi's husband (2013 – 2014)/(2015)
- Aparajita Adhya as Aparajita Chowdhury (née Basu Mallick) aka Pari/Ranga Pishi– a singer and the developmentally delayed daughter of Radharani and Purnendu; Amartya's widow (2013 – 2015)
- Pijush Ganguly as Amartya Chowdhury – Pari's mentor and husband (Deceased) (2013 – 2015)

=== Recurring ===
- Sudipta Banerjee as Arshi Basu Mallick – Neel's friend and his second wife (2013 – 2015)
- Sabitri Chatterjee as Kamalinee Basu Mallick aka Sona Thamma; Neel, Mimi, Lal and Rumi's elder paternal grandaunt and Bhombol, Shubho, Parijat and Chhoton's elder paternal aunt (2013 – 2015), Krishnendushekhar's wife (2015).
- Soumitra Chatterjee as Krishnendushekhar Basu Mallick, Neel, Mimi, Lal and Rumi's elder paternal granduncle and Bhombol, Shubho, Parijat and Chhoton's elder paternal uncle (2013 – 2015) Kamalinee's husband (2015)
- Anusuya Majumdar as Radharani Basu Mallick aka Chutki– Neel, Mimi, Lal and Rumi's grandmother and Bhombol, Shubho, Parijat and Chhoton's mother (2013 – 2015)
- Santu Mukherjee as Purnendushekhar Basu Mallick – Neel, Mimi, Lal and Rumi's grandfather and Bhombol, Shubho, Parijat and Chhoton's father (2013 – 2015)
- Bhaskar Banerjee as Bhombol – Lal and Rumi's father; Anjana's husband; Neel and Mimi's elder paternal uncle; Purnendushekhar and Radharani's eldest son (2013 – 2015)
- Bidipta Chakraborty as Anjana Basu Mallick – Lal and Rumi's mother; Neel and Mimi's elder paternal aunt; Purnendushekhar and Radharani's eldest daughter-in-law (2013 – 2015)
- Diganta Bagchi as Shubhankar Basu Mallick aka Shubho – Neel and Mimi's father; Srimoyee's husband; Purnendushekhar and Radharani's middle son (2013 – 2015)
- Rajashree Bhowmick as Srimoyee Basu Mallick – Neel and Mimi's mother; Shubhankar's wife, Purnendushekhar and Radharani's middle daughter-in-law (2013 – 2015)
- Biswanath Basu as Chhoton – Neel and Mimi's younger paternal uncle, Purnendushekhar and Radharani's youngest son, Mrinalini's husband (2013 – 2015)
- Sonali Chowdhury as Mrinalini Basu Mallick aka Minu – Neel and Mimi's younger paternal aunt, Purnendushekhar and Radharani's youngest daughter-in-law, Chhoton's wife; a primary school principal (2013 – 2015)
- Indrajit Deb as Mrinalini's father
- Ronnie Chakraborty as Laal – Neel's elder cousin brother; Bhumi's first husband (Deceased) (2013 – 2015)
- Sneha Chatterjee as Bhumisuta Basu Mallick (née Pattanayak) aka Bhumi – Samrat's wife, Laal's widow; Kaju's elder maternal cousin, Neel's elder cousin sister-in-law; Vinayak and Srishti's daughter (2013 – 2015)
- Priyadarshini Chatterjee as Rumi – Lal's younger sister (2013 – 2015)
- Priya Paul as Mimi Chowdhury (née Basu Mallick) – Neel's younger sister; Judo's wife (2013 – 2015)
- Debottam Majumder as Budhaditya Chowdhury aka Judo – Amartya's nephew; Mimi's husband (2014 – 2015)
- Rita Dutta Chakraborty as Nandini Chowdhury – Judo's mother; Amartya's elder sister-in-law (2013 – 2014)
- Rohit Mukherjee as Aranyo Chowdhury- Judo's father; Amartya's elder brother
- Runa Bandyopadhyay as Amartya's elder cousin sister
- Neel Mukherjee as Surjya Panigrahi – Kaju's father; Bhumi's maternal uncle; Srishti's younger brother-in-law; Urvashi's husband
- Badshah Maitra as Vinayak Pattanayak – Bhumi's father; Srishti's husband; a scientist; Kaju's maternal uncle; Urvashi's elder brother-in-law; (2013 – 2015)
- Anushree Das as Srishti Mukherjee – a famous dancer, Bhumi's mother; Vinayak's wife; Urvashi's elder sister; Surya Panigrahi's former love interest; Kaju's maternal aunt (2013 – 2015)
- Sagarika Roy as Urvashi – Kaju's mother; Surjya's wife; Srishti's younger sister; Bhumi's maternal aunt (2013-2015)
- Shaktipada Dey as Raghubir
- Bimal Chakraborty as Arshi's father
- Anindita Saha Kapileshwari as Arshi's mother
- Koushik Sen as Raja – Krishnendu's ex-student; Devika's husband (2015)
- Lopamudra Sinha as Devika – Raja's love interest and wife (2015)
- Kalyani Mondal as Raja's mother (2015)
- Ashok Bhattacharya as Raja's father
- Sourav Chatterjee
- Saurav Das as Chandan – Kaju's tutor; Rumi's love interest (2015)
- Sreela Majumder as Surjya's aunt
- Avrajit Chakraborty as Samrat – Bhumi's second husband
- Ashmee Ghosh as Thumri (2015)
- Swarnava Sanyal as Toppa (2015)

== Adaptations ==
Language	Title	Premiere date	Network(s)	Last aired	Notes
Bengali	Jol Nupur জল নূপুর	21 January 2013	Star Jalsha	5 December 2015	Original
Hindi	Gud Se Meetha Ishq गुड़ से मीठा इश्क	18 April 2022	Star Bharat	1 October 2022	Remake
Hindi	Jhanak 1 झनक 1	20 November 2023	Star Plus	8 June 2025	Inspired
