= Khonje =

Khonje is a surname. Notable people with the surname include:

- Ceciwa Khonje (born 1938), Malawian broadcaster and political activist
- Nelson P. W. Khonje (1923–2019), Malawian politician

== See also ==
- Ektu Aalor Khonje, upcoming Indian Bengali-language film
- Ekti Tarar Khonje, 2010 Indian Bengali-language film
