= Guddi (TV series) =

Indian Bengali television series

- Genre: Drama; Family; Romance
- Written by: Leena Gangopadhyay
- Directed by: Saibal Banerjee; Diganta Sinha
- Starring: Shyamoupti Mudly; Ranojoy Bishnu; Madhurima Basak
- Opening theme: by Anweshaa
- Composer: Debojyoti Mishra
- Country of origin: India
- Original language: Bengali
- No. of seasons: 1
- No. of episodes: 552

Production
- Producers: Sumit Kumar Roy (Magic Moments Motion Pictures); Taniya; Nilanjan (Star Jalsha)
- Production location: Kolkata
- Camera setup: Multi-camera
- Running time: 22 minutes
- Production company: Magic Moments Motion Pictures

Original release
- Network: Star Jalsha
- Release: 28 February 2022 – 7 September 2023

Guddi is a 2022 Indian Bengali-language romantic drama television series that premiered on 28 February 2022 and aired on Bengali General Entertainment Channel Star Jalsha and is also available on the digital platform Disney+ Hotstar. The serial went off air on 7 September 2023.The show is produced by Magic Moments Motion Pictures of Saibal Banerjee and Leena Gangopadhyay and stars Shyamoupti Mudly and Ranojoy Bishnu.

== Plot ==
The serial features a young girl from Darjeeling who aspires to become a police officer. However, along her path, her life becomes entwined with Anuj, a successful police officer and her father's boss who she initially considers an inspiration to serve the country. She marries Anuj out of compromise due to a series of events, while the latter is in love with his childhood friend and Guddi's teacher, Shirin. Guddi eventually unknowingly begins developing feelings for Anuj.

However, as Shirin's wrath grows for Guddi, several events finally lead to the Guddi divorcing Anuj and the latter marrying Shirin. But even after marrying Shirin, Anuj continues to cheat on Shirin with Guddi, who becomes pregnant with his child. Guddi pretends to be innocent in front of Shirin, but continues her affair with Anuj. After a long time Guddi breaks her affair with Anuj. Later Anuj also returns to Shirin. After moving on in life, Guddi marries Judhajit, a humble and supportive man, and Anuj's cousin, whom she cheats again with Anuj.

=== 6 Years Later ===
Guddi is now a successful police-officer in Darjeeling. Anuj and Shirin have a son, Bublu, while the couple face problems in their marriage as they stayed apart for 6 years. Eventually due to circumstances, Bublu meets Guddi and the two develop a growing mother-son bond while the latter is unaware that he is Anuj's son. Also Guddi marries Judhajit again but cheats on him with Anuj just like she did 6 years before.

Soon, all the lies are uncovered and suddenly, Anuj faces death bringing a shocker to Guddi and Shirin.

=== 18 Years Later ===
Guddi, now retired, lives with her adoptive daughter, Ritabhari. Ritabhari soon meets Rituraj aka Publu, and thus begins their love story.

== Cast ==
=== Main ===
- Shyamoupti Mudly as
  - Guddi Sarkar Bhatia – A retired police officer; Bohoru's daughter; Anuj and Judhajit's ex-wife; Ankush's wife; Ritabhari's adoptive mother (2022–23)
  - Dr. Ritabhari "Reshmi" Sarkar Sen – Guddi's adopted daughter; Rituraj's wife. (2023)
- Ranojoy Bishnu as
  - Anuj "Piklu" Chatterjee – A former police officer; Pinaki's adopted son; Notun's adopted step-son; Queen's adopted half-brother; Tutul, Sohaag and Judhajit's adopted cousin; Guddi's ex-husband; Shirin's ex-husband; Rituraj's father. (2022–2023)
  - Ankush Bhatia – Anuj's twin brother; Guddi's third husband. (2023)
  - Dr. Rituraj "Publu" Chatterjee – Anuj and Shirin's son; Ritabhari's husband; Ayantika's best friend and ex-fiancé (2023)
- Madhurima Basak as Shirin Banerjee – Bhaskar and Chaitali's daughter; Guddi's school teacher turned rival; Anuj's ex-wife; Rituraj's mother. (2022–2023)

=== Recurring ===
- Chandan Sen as Bohoru Sarkar – Guddi's father. (2022) (Dead)
- Debottam Majumdar as Dr. Judhajit Chatterjee – Koushola and Anandashankar's son; Queen, Tutul and Sohag's cousin; Anuj's adoptive cousin; Guddi's second ex-husband. (2022–2023)
- Shankar Chakraborty as Amitabha "Jethumoni" Chatterjee – Pinaki and Dodul's brother; Mummum's husband; Tutul and Sohaag's father; Guddi's father-figure. (2022–23)
- Sohini Sengupta as Mummum Chatterjee – Jethumoni's wife; Tutul and Sohaag's mother (2022–23)
- Sudip Mukherjee as Pinaki Chatterjee – Jethumoni and Dodul's brother; Notun's husband; Anuj's adoptive father; Queen's father; Rituraj's adoptive grandfather. (2022–23)
- Bidisha Chakraborty as Notun Chatterjee – Pinaki's second wife; Queen's mother; Anuj's adoptive step-mother; Rituraj's adoptive step-grandmother. (2022–23)
- Tathagata Mukherjee as Aabir "Tutul" Chatterjee – Jethumoni and Mummum's son; Sohaag's brother; Anuj, Queen and Judhajit's cousin; Mithi's husband; Guddi's professor and sworn brother (2022–23)
- Lovely Maitra / Shampa Banerjee as Mithi Chatterjee – Tutul's wife; Guddi's sworn sister (2022–23)
- Ambarish Bhattacharya as Dodul Chatterjee – Jethumoni and Pinaki's brother; Keya's husband (2022–23)
- Rajanya Mitra as Keya Chatterjee – Dodul's wife. (2022–23)
- Hridlekha Banerjee as Shohag Chatterjee – Jethumoni and Mummum's daughter; Tutul's sister; Anuj, Queen and Judhajit's cousin; Anirban's wife (2022–23)
- Biswabasu Biswas as Anirban, Shohag's husband (2022–23)
- Kaushiki Basu as Queen Chatterjee – Pinaki and Notun's daughter; Anuj's adoptive half-sister; Tutul, Sohaag and Judhajit's cousin (2022–23)
- Malabika Sen as Chaitali Banerjee – Bhaskar's wife; Shirin's mother; Rituraj's grandmother (2022–23)
- Debasish Roy Chowdhury as Bhaskar Banerjee – Pinaki's friend; Chaitali's husband; Shirin's father; Rituraj's grandfather (2022–23)
- Prasun Bandyopadhyay as Kinkshuk Sen – Anuj's senior (2022–23)
- Anindita Raychaudhury as Kaushalya Chatterjee – Anandashankar's wife; Judhajit's mother (2022–23)
- Ayan Sengupta
- Oindrila Bose as Ayantika – Ritabhari, Rituraj and Rigved's friend; Rituraj's ex-fiancée; Rigved's wife (2023)
- Suvajit Kar as Rigved – Ritabhari, Rituraj and Ayantika's friend; Ritabhari's ex-lover; Ayantika's husband (2023)
- Shampa Banerjee
- Monalisa Paul (2022)
- Manjusree Ganguly as Ayantika's mother
- Bhaskar Banerjee as Ayantika's father
- Tanuka Chatterjee as Mrs Bhatia: Ankush and Anuj's mother; Rituraj's grandmother (2023)
- Suman Banerjee
- Dipanjan Bhattacharya
- Mousumi Bhattacharya
- Elfina Mukherjee
- Priyanka Halder

== Reception ==
The show performs very poorly in TRP.The show has received negative critical reception for showing extra marital affairs, adultery, numerous marriage tracks, bad storyline etc. The main characters of the serial Guddi and Anuj characters have been criticised too for being characterless. This series of Magic Moments has been a victim of trolls since its inception.There have been repeated calls for the closure of Guddi on social media. It has been said that this serial is having a bad effect on the society. this serial has earned the title of the dirtiest serial on Bengali television
