= Swastika Dutta =

Indian actress (born 1994)

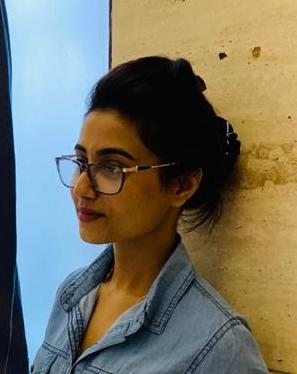
- Dutta in 2020
- Born: 23 April 1994 (age 32); Calcutta (noe Kolkata), West Bengal, India
- Occupations: Actress, model
- Years active: 2015–present
- Known for: Parbona Ami Chartey Tokey; Bhojo Gobindo; Ki Kore Bolbo Tomay

Swastika Dutta (born 23 April) known mononymously as Swastika, is an Indian actress who works in Bengali cinema. She made her debut in 2015 Bengali film Parbona Ami Chartey Tokey. She is known for her role as Dali in the comedy TV serial Bhojo Gobindo (2017), as Keka in the serial Bijoyinee (2018), and as Radhika in Ki Kore Bolbo Tomay (2019).

== Career ==
A Bengali, Dutta participated in FFACE as a model before starting her acting career. Her debut film was Parbona Ami Chartey Tokey directed by Raj Chakraborty. Her debut in television was Dugga Dugga 2015 serial, as Tara which was telecasted on Star Jalsha. In 2017 her role as Dali in Star Jalsha serial Bhojo Gobindo opposite Rohan Bhattacharya provided her the Best Style Icon 2018 Star Jalsha Parivaar Award.

== Filmography ==
=== Films ===
Year	Films	Role	Notes	Ref.
2015	Parbona Ami Chartey Tokey	Kabita Apu's friend	Debut in Supporting Role	
2016	Haripada Bandwala	Sonia	Parallel Lead	
2016	Abhimaan	Ishani	Supporting Role	
2018	Jete Nahi Dibo	Ushashi	Debut in Lead Role	
2022	Nogor Baul Kotha	Poli(Poulomi)	Female Lead	
2023	Fatafati	Bikki Sen	Lead Antagonist	
2023	Biye Bibhrat	Shakyajit's friend	Supporting Role	
2024	Alaap	Swatilekha Sen	Parallel Lead	
2024	Chaalchitro: The Frame Fatale	Purabi	Supporting Role	
2025	Bhaggyolokkhi	Gargi	Supporting Role	
2026	Bhanupriya Bhooter Hotel	Malini	Lead Role	

=== Web series ===
Year	Title	Role	Notes	Ref.			
2022	Uttaran	Tanaya	Hoichoi				
2022	Ananda Ashram	Tithi					
2022	Johny Bonny	Ankhi	Klikk				
2023	Gobhir Joler Maach (season 1)	Aratrika	Hoichoi				
2023	Antormahal		Hoichoi				
2024	Gobhir Joler Maach (season 2)	Aratrika	Hoichoi				
2024	Basanta Ese Gechhe	Chandrima	Addatimes		Khujechi Toke Raat Berate	Sohini	Addatimes

=== Television ===
Year	Title	Character	Role	Channel	Notes	Ref.
2016	Dugga Dugga	Tara	Lead role	Star Jalsha	TV debut	
2017–2018	Bhojo Gobindo	Dali	Lead role	Star Jalsha		
2018–2019	Bijoyinee	Keka / Mohini	Lead role	Star Jalsha		
2019–2020	Thakumar Jhuli	Monimala	Episodic Role	Star Jalsha		
2019–2021	Ki Kore Bolbo Tomay	Radhika Mitra Sen	Lead Role	Zee Bangla		
2022– 2023	Tomar Khola Hawa	Jhilmil	Lead Role	Zee Bangla		
2025–Present	Professor Bidya Banerjee	Bidya Banerjee	Lead Role	Star Jalsha		

== Awards and nominations ==
Year	Award	Category	Character	Film/TV show
2018	Star Jalsha Parivar Awards 2018	Style Icon	Dali	Bhojo Gobindo
2020	Zee Bangla Sonar Sansar Awards 2020	Notun Sodosya	Radhika	Ki Kore Bolbo Tomay
2021	Zee Bangla Sonar Sansar Awards 2021	Sera Juti (with Krushal Ahuja)	Radhika-Korno	Ki Kore Bolbo Tomay
2021	Zee Bangla Sonar Sansar Awards 2021	Priyo Bou	Radhika	Ki Kore Bolbo Tomay
2021	Zee Bangla Sonar Sansar Awards 2021	Zee Bangla Facebook Popular Face	Radhika	Ki Kore Bolbo Tomay
2021	Kolkata Glitz Awards 2021	Most Stylish Actress	Swastika Dutta	Ki Kore Bolbo Tomay
2023	Zee Bangla Sonar Sansar Awards 2023	Priyo Sashuri	Jhilmil	Tomar Khola Hawa
2024	FTPC India Bengal Star Icon Awards 2024	Best Supporting Actress	Swatilekha Sen	Alaap
2025	West Bengal Film Journalists' Association Awards	Best Supporting Actress	Swatilekha Sen	Alaap
2026	Zee 24 Ghanta Binodone Sera 24	Best Actor Female	Bidya Banerjee	Professor Bidya Banerjee
2026	Star Jalsha Parivar Awards	Superhit Comeback	Bidya Banerjee	Professor Bidya Banerjee
2026	Star Jalsha Parivar Awards	Star Bouma	Bidya Banerjee	Professor Bidya Banerjee
2026	Star Jalsha Parivar Awards	Sera Jomjomat Sodosyo	Bidya Banerjee	Professor Bidya Banerjee
2026	Star Jalsha Parivar Awards	Priyo Didi	Bidya Banerjee	Professor Bidya Banerjee
2026	Star Jalsha Parivar Awards	Cholo Paltai Award	Bidya Banerjee	Professor Bidya Banerjee
2026	Tele Cine Awards	Best Actor Female TV	Bidya Banerjee	Professor Bidya Banerjee
2026	Telly Adda Awards 2026	Best Actor Female	Bidya Banerjee	Professor Bidya Banerjee

== Mahalaya ==
Year	Title	Character	Channel	Ref.
2018	Durgotinashini Durga (Mahalaya 2018)	Devi Mahalaxmi	Star Jalsha	
2020	Durga Saptasati Sambhavami Yuge Yuge (Mahalaya 2020)	Devi Bhramari	Zee Bangla	
2026	Rupe Rupantare Mahisasurmardini (Mahalaya 2026)	Devi Chamunda	Star Jalsha	

== Personal life ==
Dutta was in a relationship with Shovan Ganguly.
