= Rishton Ka Manjha =

Indian television series

- Genre: Drama; Romance
- Written by: Parridhi Jaiswal
- Starring: Aanchal Goswami; Krushal Ahuja
- Theme music composer: Shibasish
- Opening theme: Riston Ka Manjha by Anweshaa
- Country of origin: India
- Original language: Hindi
- No. of episodes: 191

Production
- Producer: Susanta Das
- Production location: Kolkata
- Camera setup: Multi-camera
- Running time: 22 minutes
- Production company: Tent Cinema

Original release
- Network: Zee TV
- Release: 23 August 2021 – 2 April 2022

Related
- Deep Jwele Jaai

Rishton Ka Manjha (transl. The chain of relationships) is an Indian Hindi-language television drama series that premiered from 23 August 2021 aired on Zee TV. It is Produced by Tent Cinema and starred Aanchal Goswami and Krushal Ahuja in the lead-roles. It is a remake of Zee Bangla's TV series Deep Jwele Jaai. The show marks Krushal Ahuja's debut in the Hindi-television industry. It ended on April 2, 2022, and was replaced by Mithai in its timeslot.

== Premise ==
The story of the show revolves around Diya and Arjun, two youths from the city of Kolkata. Diya is the happy girl who dreams of making it big in badminton. However, she faces all kinds of opposition, and the broad story is about how she meets Arjun who goes on to become a strong support for her in her life journey.

== Cast ==
=== Main ===
- Aanchal Goswami as Diya Arjun Agrawal (née Mukherjee): Mohan and Meera's daughter; Bablu's sister; Arjun's Wife; Ajit's ex-fiancée
- Krushal Ahuja as Arjun Amitabh Agrawal: Amitabh and Madhuri's youngest son; Diya's Husband; Luv and Kush's younger brother; Tina's ex-fiancé

=== Recurring ===
- Nandini Chatterjee as Madhuri Amitabh Agrawal: Amitabh's wife; Luv, Kush and Arjun's mother
- Bharat Kaul as Amitabh Agrawal: Madhuri's husband; Luv, Kush and Arjun's father
- Priyanka Nayan as Deepika Luv Agrawal: Luv's wife
- Manav Sachdev as Luv Amitabh Agrawal: Madhuri and Amitabh's eldest son; Arjun and Kush's elder brother; Deepika's husband
- Farhina Parvez as Niharika Kush Agrawal: Kush's wife
- Uday Pratap Singh as Kush Amitabh Agarwal: Madhuri and Amitabh's second son; Arjun's elder brother; Luv's younger brother; Niharika's husband
- Madhavi Singh as Dadi: Amitabh's mother; Luv, Kush and Arjun's grandmother
- Mishmee Das as Tina Singhal: Sanjeev's daughter; Arjun's ex-fiancé
- Abhishek Singh as Karan Mathur: Arjun and Diya's rival
- Tapasya Dasgupta as Meera Mukherjee: Mohan's wife; Diya and Bablu's mother
- Kavita Banerjee as Kavita Mathur: Karan's sister and Arjun and Diya's rival

== Production ==
=== Development ===
Krushal Ahuja was cast as the main lead even before the show received a title.

=== Shooting ===
The shoot began in June in Kolkata and later halted due to the COVID-19 pandemic.

=== Release ===
The first promo was launched for the show along with the promo of another show, Meet: Badlegi Duniya Ki Reet on 30 July 2021.

== Adaptations ==
Language	Title	Original release	Network(s)	Last aired	Notes
Bengali	Deep Jwele Jaai দীপ জ্বেলে যাই	13 July 2015	Zee Bangla	5 March 2017	Original
Hindi	Rishton Ka Manjha रिश्तों का मांझा	23 August 2021	Zee TV	2 April 2022	Remake
Punjabi	Sanjha Sufana ਸੰਝ ਸੁਫ਼ਨਾ	26 September 2022	Zee Punjabi	23 June 2023	Remake
