= Rishav Basu =

Indian actor

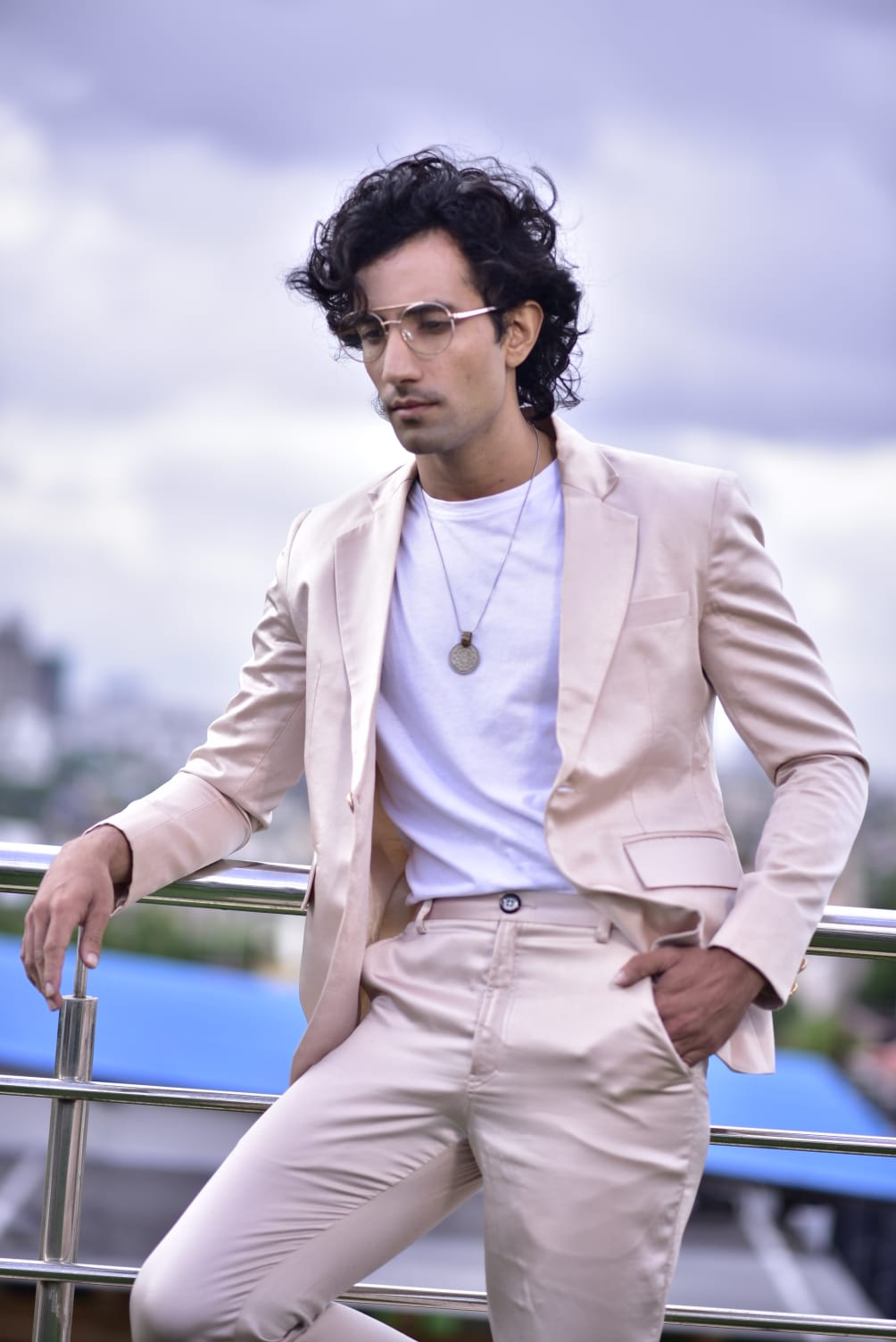
- Born: Rishav Kumar Basu; 15 September 1990 (age 36); Kolkata, West Bengal, India
- Citizenship: Indian
- Education: St. Xavier's College, Kolkata; Jadavpur University; National School of Drama, New Delhi
- Occupations: Actor; Theatre artist; Singer; Writer
- Years active: 2012–present

Rishav Kumar Basu (born 15 September 1990) is an Indian actor primarily known for his work in Bengali cinema and Bengali-language web series. He has appeared in films, web series, and television productions across Bengali, Telugu, Hindi, and Odia platforms, and has an extensive background in Bengali theatre. He is known for his lead roles in Srikanto, Saralakkho Holmes, Dhrubor Ashchorjo Jibon, and The Academy of Fine Arts.

== Early life and education ==
Rishav Basu was born on 15 September 1990 in Kolkata, West Bengal, into a lower-middle-class family. His father, Monaj Basu, worked as an ambulance driver, and his mother, Sahana Basu, was a Bengali language teacher.

He studied at St. Augustine's Day School and aspired to pursue a career as a professional footballer. However, an ACL injury cut short his sporting ambitions. He subsequently graduated with a B.Sc in Mass Communication and Videography from St. Xavier's College, Kolkata, and later completed an M.A. in Film Studies from Jadavpur University. He also undertook an extensive workshop at the National School of Drama, New Delhi.

== Career ==
=== Theatre ===
Rishav began his career in Bengali professional theatre in 2009 as a member of the theatre group Sansriti. He subsequently performed with several notable theatre groups including Bohurupee, Blank Verse, Thealight, 4th Bell Theatres, Chetana, Ashoknagar Natyamukh, Natadha, Bratyajan, and Rosikata. Over the course of his theatre career, he has been associated with more than 40 Bengali plays.

In 2011, he was awarded the Junior Scholarship in Theatre by the Ministry of Culture, Government of India.

He continues to work with Rosikata and Bongway Productions and has served as a dramatics teacher at institutions including Ashok Hall Girls' School, South Point, and Delhi Public School, North Kolkata.

=== Debut and early work ===
Rishav made his screen debut in minor roles in Meghnadhbadh Rahasya (2016) and Maati (2017). His first prominent screen appearance was in the thriller Kuasha Jokhon (2018), opposite Gargee Roy Chowdhury.

=== Breakthrough ===
He was cast as the titular male lead in Bhotbhoti, directed by Tathagata Mukherjee and produced by Pramod Films. The film's teaser received critical acknowledgement and brought him wider public attention. The film's release was delayed due to the COVID-19 pandemic in 2020.

During this period, Rishav joined the popular television drama Khorkuto on Star Jalsha, where his character Adil was praised by viewers. He subsequently appeared in the romantic comedy mini-series Turu Love on Hoichoi, playing the male lead to considerable popular acclaim.

=== Srikanto and further recognition ===
Rishav was cast in the title role of Srikanto, a Hoichoi web series based on the classic novel by Sarat Chandra Chattopadhyay, opposite Sohini Sarkar. The musical romantic drama became a major success, and its songs, including Amake Nao and Alote Chol, were widely praised. He subsequently appeared in the ensemble thriller series Mahabharat Murders on Hoichoi, playing the role of Vicky Patel.

=== Telugu debut and other projects ===
In 2024, Rishav made his debut in the Telugu film industry, playing the antagonist in Osho Tulasi Ram's Dakshina, opposite Tamil actress Sai Dhanshika. Although the film received a modest commercial response, his performance was noted by audiences and critics. He also played the lead role in the Bengali film Prosenjit Weds Rituparna, produced by Bengali superstar Prosenjit Chatterjee.

He was a part of the experimental film Gopone Mod Charan, billed as India's first single-shot feature film. He then appeared in The Academy of Fine Arts (2025), directed by Jayabrata Das and produced by Pramod Films, which became a surprise commercial success. He also served as an Executive Producer on this project.

=== Eskay Movies contract and awards ===
Rishav signed a four-film contract with leading production house Eskay Movies. His notable roles under this contract include the title role in Saralakkho Holmes — a Bengali adaptation of the Sherlock Holmes character — directed by Sayantan Ghosal. The film received positive reviews upon release, with critics noting his energetic and confident portrayal of the eccentric detective.

He also played the lead in the experimental science fiction Bengali film Dhrubor Ashchorjo Jibon, directed by Abhijit Chowdhury. The film received critical acclaim, with reviewers specifically praising Basu's central performance as Dhrubo. Dhrubor Ashchorjo Jibon won the Best Film award at the Kolkata International Film Festival, and Rishav received the Best Actor award at the North American Bengali Convention (NABC), New York.

=== Upcoming work ===
Rishav collaborated with acclaimed filmmaker duo Shiboprosad Mukherjee and Nandita Roy in Phool Pishi O Edward, produced by Windows Production, awaiting release in 2026.

=== Other work ===
In addition to his acting career, Rishav has appeared in brand campaigns for companies including Kwality Walls, Agaro, Datsun, and Tata Motors, and has featured in multiple music videos in Bengali, Hindi, and Odia.

Rishav is a singer and writer. He remains an active sportsman, regularly participating in football tournaments and exhibition matches. He was called up for the Celebrity Cricket League (CCL) team Bengal Tigers in 2026. He is also known as an animal rights activist, working extensively toward the rescue and adoption of animals.

== Filmography ==
=== Films ===
Year	Film	Character	Director	Producer	Notes
2016	Meghnad Badh Rahasya	Ashim	Anik Dutta	Friends Communication	Minor role
2017	Maati	Piyal	Leena Gangopadhyay / Saibal Banerjee	Magic Moments Motion Pictures	Minor role
2018	Mittir Parar Maradona	Bunty	Robin Das	AbolTabol Projojona / Zee Bangla Originals	
2018	Jaya Jaya Devi	Gourab	Arijeet Toton Chakravorty	Raj Chakravorty Productions / Zee Bangla Originals	
2018	Kuasha Jokhon	Alex / Surjo	Meenakshi / Abhishek	Folklore Entertainments	First prominent role
2021	Tangra Blues	Imran	Supriyo Sen	Roadshow Films	
2021	Olpo Holeo Shotti	Siddhartha	Soumojeet Adak	Roop Productions and Entertainment	
2021	Iskaboner Rani	Anish	Abhimanyu Mukherjee	Artage Productions / Zee Bangla Originals	
2022	Bhotbhoti	Bhotbhoti	Tathagata Mukherjee	Pramod Films / Wizemann Movies	Title role
2022	Prosenjit Weds Rituparna	Prosenjit / Bumba	Samrat Sharma	NeIdeas Production / Swastik Entertainment	Lead role; produced by Prosenjit Chatterjee
2022	Aparajito	Surya Shankar	Anik Dutta	Friends Communication	
2023	Tahader Katha	Rafiqul	Subrata Ghosh	EpicTale Entertainment	
2024	Dakshina	Serial Killer	Osho Tulasi Ram	Cult Concept Films	Telugu film; debut in Telugu industry
2025	Jodi Emon Hoto	Abhi	Rabin Nambiar	Eskay Movies	
2025	Dhrubor Ashchorjo Jibon	Dhrubo	Abhijit Chowdhury	Fourth Floor Entertainment / Concept Cube	Won Best Film, Kolkata International Film Festival; Rishav won Best Actor, NABC New York
2025	Annapurna	Rony	Anshuman Pratyush	Eskay Movies	
2025	The Eken: Benaras e Bibhishika	Samiran	Joydeep Mukherjee	SVF Entertainment	
2025	Saralakkho Holmes	Saralakkho Holmes	Sayantan Ghoshal	Eskay Movies	Title role; Bengali adaptation of Sherlock Holmes
2025	The Academy of Fine Arts	Sachin	Jayabrata Das	Cinenic / Pramod Films	Also Executive Producer
2026	Phool Pishi O Edward	Raja	Shiboprosad Mukherjee / Nandita Roy	Windows Production	
2026	Nibba Nibbi		Tathagata Mukherjee	Dreams On Sale	
TBA	Gopone Mod Charan	Chandu	Tathagata Mukherjee	Dreams on Sale	India's first single-shot feature film
TBA	Bhalobashi Tokey Bhalobeshe	Sam	Sayantan Ghoshal	Eskay Movies	
TBA	Lajjo	Umesh	Ananya Bhanja Chaudhuri	ABC Entertainment	
TBA	Khader Dhare Railing Ta	Shaown	Shuvam Dutta	Woverine Entertainment	

=== Web series and television ===
Year	Show	Character	Channel / OTT	Ref.
2012	CID Bengal	Gourab	Sony Aath	
2015	Byomkesh	Bijoy	ETV Bangla	
2015	Byomkesh	Bishupal's brother	ETV Bangla	
2016	Robi Thakurer Golpo	Gobindolal	ETV Bangla	
2016	Milon Tithi	Srijit	Star Jalsha	
2019	Bouma Detective	Rohit	Hoichoi	
2021	Khorkuto	Adil	Star Jalsha	
2021	Turu Love	Aritra	Hoichoi	
2022	Joy Jagannath	Arjun	Zee Bangla	
2022	Srikanto	Srikanto	Hoichoi – Title role	
2022	Mahabharat Murders	Vicky Patel	Hoichoi	
2023	Kumudini Bhavan	Rwik	Hoichoi	
2024	Alor Koley	Rishiraj	Zee Bangla	
2024	Gopon Holeo Parto	Shubho	Hoichoi	
2024	Bharate Bibhrat	Avik	Hoichoi	

== Awards and recognition ==
Year	Award	Category	Work	Result
2011	Ministry of Culture, Government of India	Junior Scholarship in Theatre	Theatre	Won
2025	North American Bengali Convention (NABC), New York	Best Actor	Dhrubor Ashchorjo Jibon	Won
2025	Kolkata International Film Festival	Best Film (Bengali Panorama)	Dhrubor Ashchorjo Jibon	Won
