= Patha Bhavan, Kolkata =

School in Kolkata, India

Patha Bhavan
- Type: Fully Private
- Established: 1965
- Founder: Satyajit Ray
- Headmistress: Bharati Chatterjee
- Faculty: 118
- Students: 2200
- Location: Kolkata, West Bengal, India
- Campus: Palm Avenue, Bondel Road, Gariahat Road (formerly Merlin Park), Ballygunge, Kolkata
- Website: Primary School; Secondary and Higher Secondary Schools

Patha Bhavan (lit. 'House for Education') is an English Medium private co-educational day school in Kolkata, India, which is affiliated to the state secondary and higher secondary boards. It is one of the old schools in Kolkata. It was established on 28 June 1965.

== History ==
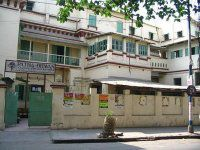
Secondary Branch, Ballygunge Place

The school was named after the university school of Visva-Bharati University (called Patha Bhavana). It was inspired by the education system started by Rabindranath Tagore as well as the more progressive features of the national movement. It was also influenced by the Bratachari movement of Gurusaday Dutt, The school was founded by the Patha Bhavan Society under the presidency of Satyajit Ray. Susobhan Sarkar, Tarun Bose, who was a judge of the High Court of Calcutta, and Amiya Bose, an eye specialist helped Ray set up the school. Ray even designed the school's logo. Jyotirindra Moitra, an exponent of Rabindrasangeet, wrote the school's song, Amader Patha Bhavan. Others who played a pivotal role in the school's establishment included Mira Datta Gupta, Uma Sehanobis, under whose guidance a group of teachers came forward to found the school, Nandita Mitra, who was appointed as the school's first-principal and Manjushree Dasgupta, who became its first-vice principal. In later years, the management of the school was in the hands of the economist, Santosh Bhattacharyya, and Barun De, both of whom were its general secretary.

== Objectives ==
The objectives of the founders of this school, which aims to prepare its students for undergraduate level college education, was twofold from the beginning: the founders wanted to establish a co-educational school in Calcutta which would offer education in both Bengali and English. In the early years of the founding of the school it was the school management's policy not to give excessive importance to examinations, although half-yearly and yearly tests were held from the school's inception. The first batch of students from the school took the Madhyamik (Secondary) Examination in 1972.

Another aim of the school was to impart an education to its students in an open atmosphere which was favourable to the sensitive mind and was similar to the method of teaching initially followed by Tagore in his school in Santiniketan, although the medium of instruction in the school in Calcutta has always been more formal in nature. While paying heed to the importance of traditional methods of learning, the founders of the school do not allow excessive emphasis to be laid on the rote method. This institution follows the principle of secular education evident in Tagore's Brahmacharya Ashram in Santiniketan.

== Logo ==
The logo of the school representing a "flame" is designed by Satyajit Ray, the world-renowned film maker who was also a commercial artist.

== Academic ==
The school has a Montessori, primary, secondary and higher secondary/junior college branches at different locations. The higher secondary branch offers subject combination in science, arts and commerce with one of the best laboratory.

=== Language policy ===
The school offered education in the mixed medium. At the start of the primary school, a student was streamlined into Bengali or English medium. Each standard used to have four sections, of which two were held in Bengali and two in English.

Later, there were five sections, of which one was held in Bengali and four in English. Following the decisions taken by the state government the school will conduct all its classes in the English medium from 2024.

The two other languages taught were Sanskrit and Hindi, which were offered as third languages from the seventh to the ninth standards. But now only Hindi is taught as the third language and it is compulsory for all students.

== Cultural activities ==
Since one of the main objectives of the school is to encourage education in Bengali both inside and outside the classrooms, it culturally identifies itself with the Santiniketan Patha Bhavana and holds programmes which have been traditionally held in that school, such as the Sahitya Sabhas.

The Sahitya Sabhas are annual meets where the students of the school participate in the writing, reading and recitation of Bengali short stories and poems. Baishey Sravan is also celebrated and observed every year. Satyajit Ray allowed the holding of the premier of his film Joy Baba Phelunath (The Elephant God) in the school. Proceeds from the viewing of his other films were also donated to the school for its development. The school also organise an annual function where students of various classes perform, plays in English and Bengali are also performed. The school observes International Mother Tongue Day on 21 February and also events like "Basanto Utsav" and Shakespeare Day.

== Houses ==
Students of the school are placed in houses named after four ancient Indian universities. Students are placed in houses from class 5. They are:

- Nalanda (Green)
- Takshashila (Yellow)
- Ujjaini (Blue)
- Vikramshila (Red)

== Sports ==
Students play sports such as cricket, football, table tennis, badminton, etc. The school has its own cricket team and football team representing in various tournaments. Its sports ground is located on Fern Road which is close to all the four buildings of the school. It organises a sports day at the Rabindra Sarovar stadium in Kolkata.

== Administration ==
Administration of the branches of the school is carried out separately. The high school is administered by an executive council which has a president and a general secretary. The daily administration of the school is in the hands of the principal.

== Affiliations ==
At the time of the founding of the school, the secondary branch of the school was affiliated to the West Bengal Board of Secondary Education, while the higher secondary branch was affiliated to the West Bengal Council of Higher Secondary Education. The school remains a private institution, relying on the fees paid by the guardians of the students for its financial management.

== Reputation ==
According to a National school survey in 2008, Patha Bhavan was placed 987th in 'Academic Reputation', 87th in 'Honesty/Integrity', 10th in 'Quality of Alumni' and 4th in 'Value for Money'.

== Location ==
The four branches of the school are located at four different sites of Ballygunge, Kolkata: the montessori and primary wings, which function under a single administration, are located at premises on Swinhoe Street and Palm Avenue, Kolkata, respectively. The High School and the humanities wing of the Higher Secondary branch are located at 103, A and C, Bondel Road, Kolkata, although the main gate of the school opens on Ballygunge Place (now Amiya Bose Sarani), while the science wing of the Higher Secondary branch is now located at 8/2, Gariahat Road (formerly Merlin Park), Kolkata.

The Merlin Park house used to be the residence of Smt. Lakshmi Ray, a former principal of the primary branch of the school. This house, an example of late colonial architecture, was given by its owner for the establishment of the school. The building in which the high school is located, another example of late colonial architecture and popularly called 'Delta House', is a colonial two storied building. Work for the construction of a new and more modern building, meant to accommodate all the branches of the school, has started at Merlin Park.

== Notable alumni ==
- Paroma Banerjee, singer
- Kaushiki Chakrabarty, singer
- Amit Kumar, singer
- Kushal Chakraborty, film and television actor
- Lagnajita Chakraborty, Bengali singer
- Soham Chakraborty, film and television actor
- Parambrata Chatterjee, film and television actor
- Siddartha Chatterjee, film artist
- Aparajita Ghosh Das, television actress
- Amrita Chattopadhyay, film and television actress
- Anik Dutta, film director
- Maitreesh Ghatak, LSE professor
- Amit Kumar, playback singer
- Sandip Ray, film director
- Gargi Roychowdhury, film and television actress
- Ditipriya Roy, film and television actress
- Srabani Sen, singer
- Shyamoupti Mudly, film and television actress
