= Sauraseni Maitra =

Indian film actress

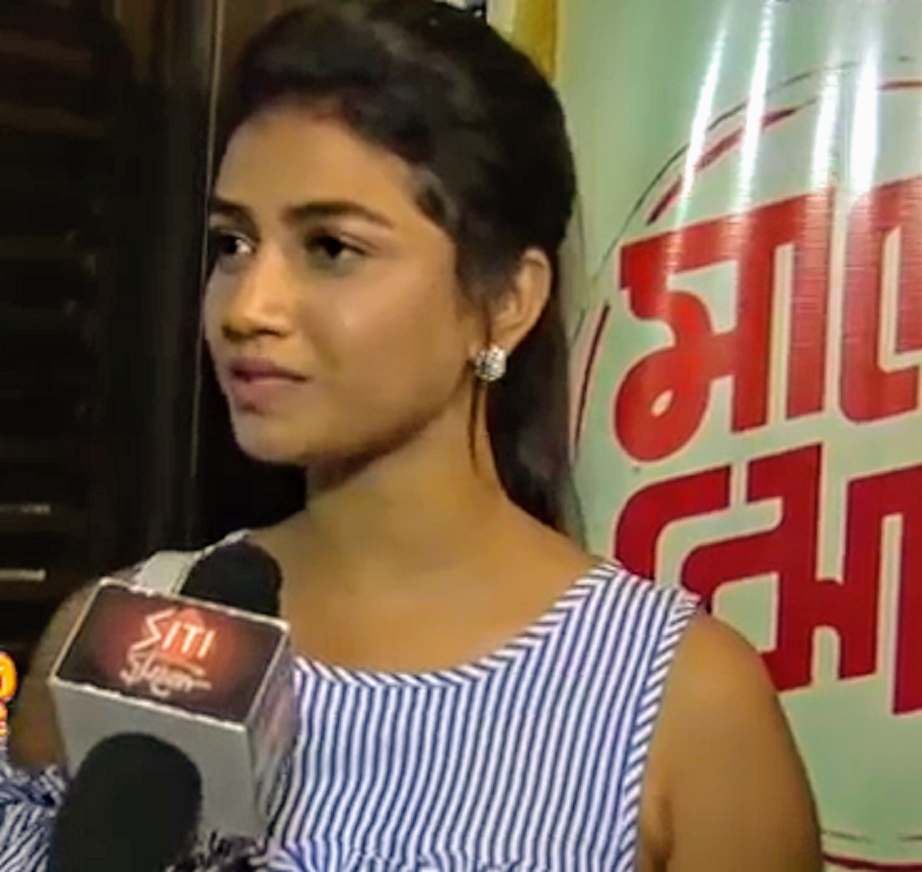
- Maitra in 2017
- Born: 13 April 1996 (age 30); Kolkata, West Bengal, India
- Education: Ballygunge Shiksha Sadan, University of Calcutta
- Occupations: actress, model
- Years active: 2005–present

Sauraseni Maitra (born 13 April 1996) is an Indian model and actress. Maitra started her career as a child actor, when she was 9 years old.

== Career ==
Sauraseni Maitra started her modelling career at an early age. She is an Indian actress who started off with the 2012 action drama film Chittagong, under the direction of Bedabrata Pain. She then went on to star in the 2015 comedy drama Umrika, directed by Prashant Nair, starring Aashish Bhatt and Uplaksh Kochhar in the lead roles. Her 2017 release includes the thriller movie Meghnadbodh Rohoshyo, under the direction of Anik Datta, starring in the lead role opposite Sabyasachi Chakraborty and Abir Chatterjee. Her other project includes director Pratim D. Gupta's drama movie Maacher Jhol starring Paoli Dam and Kaya Blocksage in the lead roles opposite Sauraseni. She worked in an advertisement directed by Bengali film director Anik Dutta, in which Bollywood film actress Deepika Padukone acted as well.

== Filmography ==
Year	Title	Role	Notes
2012	Chittagong	Aparna (young)	
2015	Umrika	Radhika	
2017	Machher Jhol	Maggi	
2017	Meghnad Badh Rahasya	Guli	
2018	Generation Ami	Sreoshi Bose aka Durga	
2018	Byomkesh Gotro	Chumki	
2018	Aami Ashbo Phirey	Oona	
2019	Finally Bhalobasha	Ahiri	
2019	Satyameva Jayate	Yasmin	
2019	Daawat-e-Biryani	Panchali	
2019	Synthetic Sati	Paro	
2020	Bonobas		Short film
2021	Syndicate		
2021	Ekannoborti	Shila Chatterjee	
2023	Maayakumari	Nandini	
2024	Sedin Kuyasha Chilo		
2024	Sada Ronger Prithibi	Ollokkhi	
2024	Babli	Jhuma Bose	
2024	Shastri	Anuradha	
2025	Shotyi Bole Shotyi Kichhu Nei	Arundhati	
2025	Sweet Dreams	Roop	
2025	Aamar Boss	Sharbani Banerjee	
2025	Saali Mohabbat	Shalini Saxena	
2026	Nibba Nibbi		

== Web series ==
Year	Web Series	Channel	Role	Notes	Ref.
2020	Break Up Story	Hoichoi	Shreya		
2020	Lalbazaar	Zee5	Mira		
2021	Ek Thi Begum	Mx Player	Aneeta	Season 2	
2023	Shabash Feluda	Zee5	Rinchen Ganpo (Charlie)	Season 1	
2023	Taj: Divided by Blood	Zee5	Mehrunnisa	Season 2	
2023	Amriter Sandhane - The Banaras Chapter	Addatimes	Disha Chatterjee	Season 1	
2024	Unishe April	Fridaay	Ronita	Season 1	
2026	Jazz City	SonyLIV	Sheela	Hindi Web Series; based on Bangladesh Liberation War	
