= Bijoyinee =

Indian Bengali television soap opera

- Genre: Family
- Created by: Susanta Das
- Developed by: Sushanta Das
- Screenplay by: Lovely Mukherjee; Dialogues; Sourav Sengupta
- Story by: Star Jalsha
- Directed by: Pijush Ghosh
- Creative directors: Nafisa; Susmita
- Presented by: Bright Advertising Pvt. Ltd.
- Starring: Swastika Dutta; Rudrajit Mukherjee; Anjana Basu
- Theme music composer: Debjit Roy
- Opening theme: "Bijoyinee" by Anweshaa
- Composer: Priyo Chattopadhyay
- Country of origin: India
- Original language: Bengali
- No. of episodes: 184

Production
- Executive producers: Reshmi, Shaoni (Star Jalsha)
- Producers: Surinder Singh; Gurjit Singh; Sushanta Das (Boyhood Productions)
- Production location: Kolkata
- Cinematography: Ashok; Shantanu
- Editor: Shubhajit
- Running time: 22 minutes
- Production company: Boyhood Productions

Original release
- Network: Star Jalsha
- Release: 24 December 2018 – 23 August 2019

Bijoyinee is an Indian Bengali television soap opera that was premiered on 24 December 2018, and is broadcast on Bengali General Entertainment Channel Star Jalsha and is also available on the digital platform Hotstar The series was starring Swastika Dutta and Rudrajit Mukherjee in lead roles with Anjana Basu in a negative role. It marks the come back of Anjana Basu into Bengali television. The show is produced by Boyhood Productions. The show went off air on 23 August 2019 and it got replaced by another show titled Kunjochaya.

== Plot ==
Bijoyinee is the tale of Keka, daughter of a maid servant at a wealthy house, and her struggles to become a great dancer. Her main problem is that a well-known classical dancer, Subarna, whose house her mother works at, detests her and prevents her from working in the dance industry because of her lower status.

== Cast ==
=== Main cast ===
- Lekha Chatterjee / Swastika Dutta as Keka and Mohini
  - Sambhabi Mukherjee as child Keka
- Imtiaz Haque / Rudrajit Mukherjee as Ritwik
  - Samriddho as Child Ritwik
- Anjana Basu as Subarna, Ritwik's mother, a renowned classical dancer.
- Ratri Ghatak as Monika a.k.a. Moni, Keka's mother

=== Support cast ===
- Madhurima Basak as Nupur
- Akash Ghosh as Chotu
- Anirban Ghosh as Snehasish
- Arpita Mondal as Rinku
- Joy Bhattacharya as Jatin
- Sukanya Dutta as Naina
- Purbasha Debnath as Tutul
- Antara Sarkar as Mithu
- Dipa Roy as Gopali Jethi
- Krishnakishore Mukherjee as Indra
- Sanjoy Bapi Basu as Raghab
- Avery Singha Roy as Anamika
- Vivaan Ghosh as Taposh
- Debika Mitra as Thammi
