= Ronkini Bhavan =

Bengali psychological thriller web series

- Genre: Psychological thriller
- Written by: Meghatithi Banerjee
- Directed by: Abhrajit Sen
- Starring: Shyamoupti Mudly; Gourab Roy Chowdhury; Bidipta Chakraborty
- Country of origin: India
- Original language: Bengali
- No. of seasons: 1

Production
- Producer: Prantik Basu
- Cinematography: Turja Ghosh
- Editor: Swarnava Chakraborty
- Production company: Maverixx Productions

Original release
- Network: ZEE5
- Release: 25 December 2025

Ronkini Bhavan is an Indian Bengali-language psychological thriller directed by Abhrajit Sen. It stars Shyamoupti Mudly and Gourab Roy Chowdhury, with Bidipta Chakraborty in a supporting role. It is an adaptation of Kannada web series Ayyana Mane.

== Premise ==
The story follows Juthika, a newly married woman who arrives at her husband's ancestral mansion and encounters references to a family curse and a history of wives who have met unexplained fates. As she begins to question the household's rituals and secrets, a police visit to the property points to an investigation linked to the family's past.

== Cast ==
- Shyamoupti Mudly as Juthika
- Gourab Roy Chowdhury as Adityanath
- Bidipta Chakraborty as Padmavati
- Avery Singha Roy as Ballari
- Siddharta Ghosh as Shibnath
- Aniruddha Gupta as Rudranath
- Suhotra Mukhopadhyay as Manas Mahato
- Ishani Sengupta as Kamalini
- Tanika Basu

== Episodes ==
| No. | Title | Directed by | Written by | Original release date |
|---|---|---|---|---|
| 1 | "Griho Pravesh" | Abhrajit Sen | Meghatithi Banerjee | 25 December 2025 |
Following her marriage, Juthika enters Ronkini Bhavan, a prominent household in rural Bengal. An unexpected death during her arrival introduces her to long-standing beliefs surrounding a supposed family curse.
| 2 | "Bishorjon" | Abhrajit Sen | Meghatithi Banerjee | 25 December 2025 |
A disturbing incident involving her brother-in-law unsettles Juthika, as she gradually learns about the mysterious circumstances surrounding the former daughter-in-law’s death.
| 3 | "Dahan" | Abhrajit Sen | Meghatithi Banerjee | 25 December 2025 |
As Binodini recalls past tragedies within the family, the narrative of a curse gains strength, leaving Juthika questioning whether fate plays a role in the household’s repeated losses.
| 4 | "Shamapti" | Abhrajit Sen | Meghatithi Banerjee | 25 December 2025 |
The resurfacing of unresolved memories strains personal relationships, while another death intensifies anxiety and suspicion within Ronkini Bhavan.
| 5 | "Shodh" | Abhrajit Sen | Meghatithi Banerjee | 25 December 2025 |
Evidence of deliberate poisoning shifts the focus from superstition to human intent, as Juthika’s investigation places her directly in harm’s way.
| 6 | "Bishbrikkho" | Abhrajit Sen | Meghatithi Banerjee | 25 December 2025 |
After Juthika suffers the effects of poisoning, tensions escalate further when warnings of concealed threats deepen the household’s sense of impending disaster.
| 7 | "Shaapmochan" | Abhrajit Sen | Meghatithi Banerjee | 25 December 2025 |
Hidden links between past and present events are finally revealed, reshaping Juthika’s understanding of the family and bringing the central mystery to a resolution.

== Release ==
The series premiered on ZEE5 on 25 December 2025. The series was announced with a first look poster on 6 December 2025.

== Reception ==
Arpita Sarkar of OTTplay rated the series 3.5 out of 5, describing it as a "psychological thriller that combines suspense with themes of trauma and fear, and recommending it as a notable entry in the genre."
