= Jiban Mukhopadhyay =

Indian politician (former TMC MLA) and historian (1948/1949–2025)

Jiban Mukhopadhyay জীবন মুখোপাধ্যায়
- Constituency: Sonarpur Daskhin Assembly Constituency

MLA of Sonarpur Dakshin Vidhan Sabha Constituency
- In office 2011–2021
- Preceded by: Constituency Established
- Succeeded by: Arundhati Maitra

Personal details
- Born: 1948 or 1949 West Bengal, India
- Died: 7 January 2025 (aged 76) Kolkata, India
- Party: All India Trinamool Congress

Jiban Mukhopadhyay (1948 or 1949 – 7 January 2025) was an Indian politician and historian. He was elected as MLA of Sonarpur Dakshin Vidhan Sabha Constituency in West Bengal Legislative Assembly in 2011 and 2016. He was a member of the All India Trinamool Congress. Mukhopadhyay died on 7 January 2025, at the age of 76.
