= Sonarpur Dakshin Assembly constituency =

Constituency of the West Bengal Legislative Assembly, in India

Sonarpur Dakshin
- Constituency No. 147 for the West Bengal Legislative Assembly
- Interactive Map Outlining Sonarpur Dakshin Assembly Constituency

Constituency details
- Country: India
- Region: East India
- State: West Bengal
- District: South 24 Parganas
- Lok Sabha constituency: Jadavpur
- Established: 1962
- Reservation: None

Member of Legislative Assembly
- 18th West Bengal Legislative Assembly
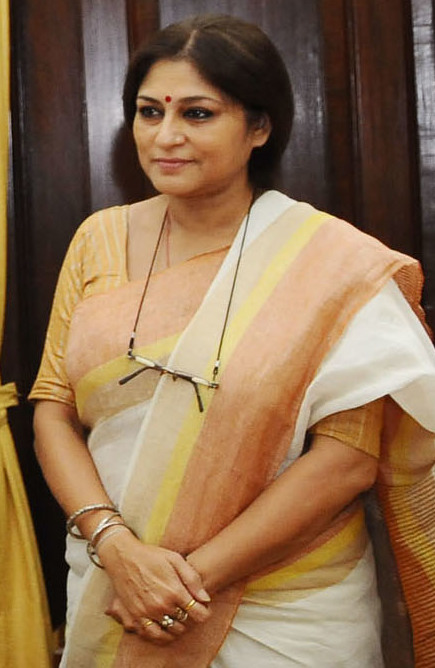
- Incumbent Roopa Ganguly
- Party: BJP
- Alliance: NDA
- Elected year: 2026

Most Successful parties from Sonarpur Dakshin Vidhansabha
1. Communist Party of India (2 times) (12.5%)
2. Communist Party of India (Marxist) (9 times) (56.2%)
3. Trinamool Congress (4 time) (25.0%)
4. Bharatiya Janata Party (1 time) (6.25%)

Sonarpur Dakshin Assembly constituency is a Legislative Assembly constituency of South 24 Parganas district in the Indian State of West Bengal.

== Overview ==
As per order of the Delimitation Commission in respect of the Delimitation of constituencies in the West Bengal, Sonarpur Dakshin Assembly constituency is composed of the following:

- Ward Nos. 9, 10, 11, 12, 13, 14, 15, 16, 17, 18, 19, 20, 21, 22, 23, 24, 25 and 26 of Rajpur Sonarpur municipality
- Kalikapur-I, Kalikapur-II, Langalberia, Poleghat, Pratapnagar and Sonarpur-II gram panchayats of Sonarpur community development block

Sonarpur Dakshin Assembly constituency is a part of No. 22 Jadavpur Lok Sabha constituency.

== Members of the Legislative Assembly ==
Year	Name	Party
Sonarpur
1962	Khagendra Kumar Roy Choudhury	Communist Party of India
1967	Gangadhar Naskar	Communist Party of India (Marxist)
1969	Gangadhar Naskar	Communist Party of India (Marxist)
1971	Gangadhar Naskar	Communist Party of India (Marxist)
1972	Kansari Halder	Communist Party of India
1977	Gangadhar Naskar	Communist Party of India (Marxist)
1982	Gangadhar Naskar	Communist Party of India (Marxist)
1987	Bhadreswar Mondal	Communist Party of India (Marxist)
1991	Bhadreswar Mondal	Communist Party of India (Marxist)
1996	Bhadreswar Mondal	Communist Party of India (Marxist)
2001	Nimai Chandra Mondal	Trinamool Congress
2006	Shyamal Naskar	Communist Party of India (Marxist)
Sonarpur Dakshin
2011	Jiban Mukhopadhyay	Trinamool Congress
2016	Jiban Mukhopadhyay	Trinamool Congress
2021	Arundhuti Maitra	Trinamool Congress
2026	Roopa Ganguly	Bharatiya Janata Party

== Election results ==
=== 2026 ===
2026 West Bengal Legislative Assembly election: Sonarpur Dakshin
Party	Candidate	Votes	%	±%
BJP	Roopa Ganguly	128,970	52.34	▲16.67
AITC	Arundhuti Maitra	93,188	37.82	▼9.10
CPI	Paramita Dasgupta	16,784	6.81	▼6.84
NOTA	None of the above	1,950	0.79	▼0.31
Majority		35,782	14.52	▲3.27
Turnout		246,393	94.35	▲13.59
BJP gain from AITC		Swing		

=== 2021 ===
2021 West Bengal Legislative Assembly election: Sonarpur Dakshin
Party	Candidate	Votes	%	±%
AITC	Arundhuti Maitra	109,222	46.92	▼0.88
BJP	Anjana Basu	83,041	35.67	▲27.95
CPI	Shuvam Banerjee	31,778	13.65	▼26.78
NOTA	None of the above	2,550	1.10	
Majority		26,181	11.25	
Turnout		232,807	80.76	
AITC hold		Swing		

=== 2016 ===
2016 West Bengal Legislative Assembly election: Sonarpur Dakshin
Party	Candidate	Votes	%	±%
AITC	Jiban Mukhopadhyay	97,455	47.80	▼11.23
CPI	Tarit Chakraborty	82,426	40.43	▲3.64
BJP	Manoranjan Joddar	15,735	7.72	▲6.00
NOTA	None of the above	3,023	1.48	New entry
Majority		15,029	7.37	▼14.87
Turnout		2,03,884	82.48	▼1.30
AITC hold		Swing		

=== 2011 ===
2011 West Bengal Legislative Assembly election: Sonarpur Dakshin
Party	Candidate	Votes	%	±%
AITC	Jiban Mukhopadhyay	100,243	59.03	
CPI	Tarit Chakraborty	62,469	36.79	
BJP	Hasi Singha Roy	2,926	1.72	
Independent	Manoj Kumar Barman	1,687	0.99	
BSP	Subrata Halder	1,081	0.64	
Independent	Prasanta Majumdar	713	0.42	
RJP	Jyoshikanta Joddar	372	0.22	
PPI(S)	Paul Sanpui	325	0.19	
Majority		37,774	22.24	
Turnout		1,69,816	83.78	
AITC win (new seat)				

=== 2006 ===
In 2006 Shyamal Naskar of CPI(M) won the Sonarpur Assembly constituency defeating his nearest rival Nirmal Chandra Mondal of AITC. In 2001, Nirmal Chandra Mondal of AITC defeated Abha Mondal of CPI(M). Bhadreswar Mondal of CPI(M) defeated Nirmal Chandra Mondal of INC in 1996 and 1991, and Sovaranjan Sardar of INC in 1987. Gangadhar Naskar of CPI(M) defeated Ramkanta Mondal of ICS in 1982 and Gourhari Sardar of INC in 1977.

=== 1972 ===
Kansari Halder of CPI won in 1972. Gangadhar Naskar of CPI(M) won in 1971, 1969, and 1967. Khagendra Kumar Roy Choudhury of CPI won in 1962.
