= Santosh Bhattacharyya =

Vice chancellor at University of Culcutta

Santosh Bhattacharaya
- Born: 1 November 1924; Calcutta, Bengal Presidency, British India
- Died: 10 March 2011 (aged 86); Kolkata, West Bengal, India

Academic background
- Education: Scottish Church College (B Sc); University of Calcutta (M Sc); London School of Economics (PhD)

Academic work
- Institutions: Indian Statistical Institute; University of Calcutta

Santosh Bhattacharyya (1 November 1924 – 10 March 2011) was an Indian economist, who served as a Vice Chancellor of the University of Calcutta, in Kolkata, India.

== Early life ==
He was born in Calcutta on 1 November 1924 in a Brahmin family. He studied economics at the renowned Scottish Church College and earned his master's degree from the University of Calcutta. Later he would earn a doctorate in economics from the London School of Economics .

== Career ==
After earning his master's degree, he worked as a technical assistant at the Indian Statistical Institute.

He taught economics at the University of Calcutta in two phases: 1952–60, and later from 1968 to 1983. He chaired the department (1970–80), and became dean of the faculty of arts (1973–77). He was Senior Economic Affairs Officer at the Development Planning Centre in the United Nations at New York (1966–68), member of the Tariff Commission, Government of India (1974–75), Chairman of several Pay Committees under West Bengal government during 1977–80. He was a general secretary of Patha Bhavan, Calcutta in the 1980s.

== Political beliefs ==
As a student, Bhattacharyya was a full member of the erstwhile Communist Party of India, and later continued as an active sympathizer of the parent party till he parted ways as a believer in market economy following the changes in China.

As a vice chancellor of the University of Calcutta (1983–1987), he was victimized for his apolitical stance and public criticism of the policies and practices of the Communist Party of India (Marxist) led Left Front regime (1977–2011) that interfered with the autonomy of the university.

== Works ==
- Red Hammer Over Calcutta University (1984–1987)https://archive.org/details/red-hammer-over-calcutta-university-1984-1987-sa-230502-191950
- Management Control Systems : a Framework for Resolution of Problems of Implementation
- Land Reforms in West Bengal. A Study on Implementation
- Capital Longevity and Economic Growth
