= Shyamoupti Mudly =

Indian actress

- Born: 4 November 2002 (age 24); Kolkata, West Bengal, India
- Occupation: Actress
- Years active: 2015–present
- Known for: Bajlo Tomar Alor Benu (2018); Dhrubatara (2020); Guddi (2022)
- Spouse: Ranojoy Bishnu (2026)

Shyamoupti Mudly (born 4 November 2002) is an Indian actress who works in Bengali television industry. Her debut soap opera was Daasi. She is best known for portraying the female lead in the daily soaps Bajlo Tomar Alor Benu and Dhrubatara.

== Personal life ==
Shyamoupti Mudly was born on 4 November 2002. She completed her schooling from Patha Bhavan, Kolkata. After that, besides her acting career, she is pursuing a degree in Sociology from Amity University, Kolkata. She married her co-actor Ranojoy Bishnu on 14 February 2026, on the occasion of Valentine's Day.

== Filmography ==
=== Television ===
Year	Title	Role	Language	Channels	Notes	Ref.
2015–2016	Chokher Bali	Sarju	Bengali	Zee Bangla	Supporting role	
2016–2017	Dashi	Mungli	Bengali	Colors Bangla	Lead role	
2017	Potol Kumar Gaanwala	Tuli	Bengali	Star Jalsha	Negative Role	
2017–2018	Karunamoyee Rani Rashmoni	Sarju (later replaced by Ipshita Mukherjee)	Bengali	Zee Bangla	Supporting Role	
2018–2019	Bajlo Tomar Alor Benu	Mrinmoyee Pal a.k.a. Minu	Bengali	Star Jalsha	Lead role	
2020–2021	Dhrubatara	Tara Lahiri	Bengali	Star Jalsha	Lead role	
2022–2023	Guddi	Guddi / Reshmi	Bengali	Star Jalsha	Lead role	
2024–2025	Amar Sangee	Shree	Bengali	Zee Bangla	Lead role	
2025	Ronkini Bhavan	Juthika	Bengali		Lead role	

=== Films ===
- Bultir Result (2020)
- Phool Pishi O Edward (2026)
- Rohosyo (2026)

== Awards ==
- Zee Bangla Sonar Sansar Awards 2025 - Priyo Bou as Shree for Amar Sangee
