= Debottam Majumdar =

Bengali television actor

- Citizenship: Indian
- Occupation: Actor
- Known for: Shona in Keya Patar Nouko
- Notable work: Binni Dhaner Khoi (2009); Keya Patar Nouko (2011)
- Spouse: Snigdha Majumder

Debottam Majumdar is a Bengali television actor. He started his career in acting by performing in Bengali soap opera series Kokhono Megh Kokhono Brishti. He is well known for playing the male lead role of Shona babu as the protagonist in Keya Patar Nouko.

== Career ==
Debottam forayed into Bengali television with Kokhono Megh Kokhono Brishti telecasted on ETV Bangla. He became quite popular for his role as the protagonist in Keya Patar Nouko. Beside these, he is noted for playing father and son dual-role in Binni Dhaner Khoi also. Recently, he is seen playing contrasting roles in Khorkuto and Desher Maati. Apart from acting, he has been very vocal related to social issues of health, hygiene and cleanliness.

== List of works ==
=== Television ===
Year	Title	Role	Language	Channel	Comments
2008	Kokhono Megh Kokhono Brishti		Bengali	ETV Bangla	
2009 - 2012	Binni Dhaner Khoi	Rishi and Chiru	Bengali	ETV Bangla	
2009 - 2011	Saat Paake Bandha	Apu	Bengali	Zee Bangla	
2011 - 2013	Keya Patar Nouko	Souendra Narayan Chakraborty aka Shona	Bengali	Zee Bangla	
2013 - 2015	Jol Nupur	Budhaditya Chowdhury aka Judo	Bengali	Star Jalsha	
2014 - 2016	Tumi Robe Nirobe	Arjun Sen	Bengali	Zee Bangla	
2014 - 2016	Chokher Tara Tui	Rishi Banerjee	Bengali	Star Jalsha	
2015 - 2016	Samapti from Robi Thakurer Golpo	Amulya	Bengali	Colors Bangla	
2017 - 2018	Mayar Badhon	Riddhi	Bengali	Star Jalsha	
2019	Bajlo Tomar Alor Benu	Joyraj Mitra aka Joy	Bengali	Star Jalsha	
2019- 2020	Guriya Jekhane Guddu Sekhane		Bengali	Star Jalsha	
2019 -2021	Jiyon Kathi	Harsho Bardhan Sen	Bengali	Sun Bangla	
2019-2020	Sreemoyee	Sankalpo Chatterjee	Bengali	Star Jalsha	
2019 - 2022	Mohor	Gourab Sen	Bengali	Star Jalsha	
2020 - 2022	Khorkuto	Abhijnan Mukherjee aka Riju	Bengali	Star Jalsha	
2021	Desher Maati	Shibnath Das aka Shibu (Shivnath)	Bengali	Star Jalsha	
2022	Dhulokona	Debmalya Basu	Bengali	Star Jalsha	
2022 - 2023	Guddi	Dr Judhajit	Bengali	Star Jalsha	
2022–Present	Sohag Chand	Suryasekhar Banerjee	Bengali	Colors Bangla	
2023 - 2024	Jol Thoi Thoi Bhalobasha	Tunir Basu	Bengali	Star Jalsha	
2024–present	Rangamati Tirandaj		Bengali	Star Jalsha	
2026	Kusum	Soumyajit Dasgupta aka Shyam	Bengali	Zee Bangla	
