= Arundhuti Maitra =

Indian politician (born 1990)

Member of West Bengal Legislative Assembly
- In office 2 May 2021 – 4 May 2026
- Preceded by: Jiban Mukhopadhyay
- Succeeded by: Roopa Ganguly
- Constituency: Sonarpur Dakshin

Personal details
- Born: 17 November 1990 (age 35) Calcutta, West Bengal, India
- Party: Trinamool Congress (2021–present)
- Other name: Lovely Maitra
- Occupations: Actress; Politician
- Years active: 2010–2021

Arundhuti Maitra (born 17 November 1990), better known as Lovely Maitra, is an Indian actress and politician who is known for her work in Bengali television. She started her career as the lead actress in the hugely popular 2013 Bengali television serial Jol Nupur, on Star Jalsha. She has also acted in other Bengali TV series like Mohar and Guddi.

== Political career ==
In 2021 West Bengal Legislative Assembly election, she was elected to the West Bengal Legislative Assembly from Sonarpur Dakshin, as a member of the All India Trinamool Congress.

== Television ==
- Saat Paake Bandha as Munni
- Subarnalata
- Sholo Aana as Lovely - ETV Bangla
- Binni Dhaner Khoi
- Jol Nupur as Sankhamala “Kajol / Kaju” Panigrahi - Star Jalsha
- Esho Maa Lokkhi as Togor
- Mohor as Titir Basu Bandhopadhyay - Star Jalsha
- Guddi as Mithi Chatterjee - Star Jalsha
- Chirosakha as Anushree Chatterjee aka Mithil - Star Jalsha
