= Uday Pratap Singh (actor) =

Indian film and television actor

- Known for: Actor - Films & Television
- Notable work: Ki Kore Bolbo Tomay; Mithai; Neem Phooler Madhu; Parineeta
- Spouse: Anamika Chakraborty (m. 2023)

Uday Pratap Singh is an Indian film and television actor, who works predominantly in the Bengali film industry. His debut serial was Tumi Ele Tai which aired on Colors Bangla in lead role opposite Diya Mukherjee. He is best known for his roles in Mithai as Ratul Mitra (where also he paired with actress Diya Mukherjee), in Neem Phooler Madhu as Chayan Dutta and in Parineeta as Rayan Basu. He started his acting career in 2015 when he started as leads but his main debut as a male lead was in Zee Bangla's Parineeta in the year 2024 opposite newcomer actress Ishani Chatterjee which gained him more popularity. He married actress Anamika Chakraborty in the year 2023

== Television ==
=== Serials ===
Year	Serial	Character	Channel	Notes	Ref.
2015-2016	Tumi Ele Taai		Colors Bangla	Lead Role	
2017	Debipaksha		Star Jalsha		
2017-2018	Jamai Raja	Abhishek Jalan	Zee Bangla	Antagonist	
2018-2019	Aloy Bhubon Bhora		Colors Bangla	Lead Role	
2019-2021	Guriya Jekhane Guddu Sekhane	Guddu/Rocky Rockstar/Raju Bose	Star Jalsha	Lead Role	
2019-2021	Ki Kore Bolbo Tomay	Joy Basu	Zee Bangla	Antagonist	
2021-2022	Rishton Ka Manjha	Kush Amitabh Agarwal	Zee TV	Supporting Role	
2021-2023	Mithai	Ratul Mitra	Zee Bangla	Supporting Role	
2023-2024	Neem Phooler Madhu	Chayan Dutta	Zee Bangla	Supporting Role	
2023	Kon Gopone Mon Bheseche	Kinjal Mallick	Zee Bangla	Supporting Role	
2024-Present	Parineeta	Rayan Basu	Zee Bangla	Lead Role	
