= Nibba Nibbi =

2026 Indian Bengali film

- Directed by: Tathagata Mukherjee
- Written by: Tathagata Mukherjee
- Produced by: Avinaba Ghosh; Tathagatha Mukherjee
- Starring: Rishav Basu; Sauraseni Maitra; Shantilal Mukherjee; Shankar Chakraborty
- Cinematography: Subhadeep Naskar
- Edited by: Biswabasu Biswas
- Production company: Dreams On Sale
- Distributed by: ZEE5
- Release date: August 14, 2026
- Country: India
- Language: Bengali

Nibba Nibbi is a 2026 Indian Bengali-language film written and directed by Tathagata Mukherjee, starring Rishav Basu and Sauraseni Maitra alongside Shantilal Mukherjee and Shankar Chakraborty. It premiered on ZEE5 on 14 August 2026.

== Plot ==
Deva steals a hard drive belonging to his wealthy father that contains compromising material on several powerful men, and uses it to blackmail him. His pregnant girlfriend, known as Paro or Parvati, goes with him. The two are pursued across West Bengal by men trying to get the drive back.

== Cast ==
- Rishav Basu as Deva
- Sauraseni Maitra as Paro / Parvati
- Shantilal Mukherjee
- Shankar Chakraborty

== Production ==
The film was produced under the banner Dreams On Sale. Mukherjee wrote the story and screenplay and directed it, co-writing the dialogue with Avignan Bhattacharya.

== Release ==
Nibba Nibbi premiered on ZEE5 in Bengali on 14 August 2026.

== Reception ==
Souvik Saha, reviewing the film for Cinekolkata, gave it 1.5 out of 5. In his view the film leans on violence, gunfire and profanity in place of a coherent story, and character motivations often go unexplained. He found the pregnancy plotline exaggerated to the point of being unintentionally funny rather than tense. Rishav Basu and Sauraseni Maitra, he wrote, "make an effort to carry their respective roles", but he singled out Shantilal Mukherjee's performance as disappointing.

Debotri Ghosh, writing for Sangbad Pratidin, was more mixed on the film. She thought it tried to take on too much at once, political hypocrisy, social disorder, the male gaze, all filtered through dark comedy, and that the screenplay lost its footing as a result. The dialogue, co-written by Mukherjee and Bhattacharya, struck her as weak in places. Basu held on to the character's erratic energy, and Mukherjee and Chakraborty gave solid support in her assessment; Maitra, though, fell short of what she had expected. She liked the action sequences, and noticed lines from Rabindranath Tagore and Joy Goswami turning up amid otherwise profanity-heavy dialogue.

Aajkaal also reviewed the film, "'Nibba-Nibbi' has sheltered the violent resistance in the fight for survival".
