= Ki Kore Bolbo Tomay =

Indian Bengali soap opera

- Promotional poster
- Genre: Drama; Romance
- Created by: Shashi Mittal
- Written by: Prashant Rathi; Paromita Munshi Bhattacharya; Adrija Koinak
- Story by: Prashant Rathi; Manali Karia
- Directed by: Ayan Sengupta; Pavel Ghosh
- Creative directors: Prashant Rathi; Diya Jalcchabbi; Srijit Roy; Manash Chakraborty
- Starring: Swastika Dutta; Krushal Ahuja
- Opening theme: 'Acho Kachakachi Jani'
- Country of origin: India
- Original language: Bengali
- No. of episodes: 383

Production
- Executive producers: Srijita Chakraborty; Avay Chakraborty
- Producers: Shashi Mittal; Sumeet Hukamchand Mittal
- Production location: Chitrayan Studio
- Camera setup: Multi-camera
- Running time: 22 minutes
- Production company: Shashi Sumeet Productions

Original release
- Network: Zee Bangla
- Release: 16 December 2019 – 6 August 2021

Ki Kore Bolbo Tomay is an Indian Bengali television romantic family drama serial broadcast on the TV channel Zee Bangla. It premiered on 16 December 2019. Swastika Dutta and Krushal Ahuja played the lead roles. The series was produced by Shashi Mittal and Sumeet Hukumchand Mittal under the banner of Shashi Sumeet Productions. The story mainly revolves around Radhika and Karna's life.

== Plot ==
Radhika is a kind-hearted woman. She is a fashion designer, where she wants to be in life, and focused on her goals. One day, she is engaged to Koushik, who she is smitten with. All seemed well until the day before their wedding, when Koushik goes missing. This takes everyone by shock, and Radhika's world comes crashing down. Amidst the heartbreak and sorrow, Radhika resolves to move on and takes up a job with a clothing line, where she meets Karna, the head of the company. He is broken-hearted and a businessman. He soon falls for Radhika, who is unrelenting, bearing in mind her responsibilities and obligations. Radhika finds her way in the maze of relationship and ethics.

After facing several hurdles, Radhika and Karna finally get married. Earlier, Karna tried to protect Radhika from getting humiliated in front of others. He puts sindoor on her forehead. Initially, the family members do not accept the relationship. Finally the couple gets hitched following all the rituals, but soon Karana's ex, Janhavi comes into his life and tries to claim him back. Karna refuses and tells her he will never return in his life since they both are married now, and he loves Radhika. She then frames him for molesting her, but Radhika fights his case and proves him innocent. This proves Janhavi is guilty and gets sentenced for 1 year in prison. After this incident, her husband, Mr. Dutta divorces her. Soon after, Karna and Radhika start facing relationship problems as Karna gets busy with his work. Later, due to a misunderstanding, Karna slaps Radhika and Payel uses this opportunity to create a rift between them. Radhika leaves Karna and goes to Darjeeling.

Five years later, Radhika settles in Darjeeling and has adopted a child, Abhi. She is a part of Christian school where she loves all the students and looks after them. Karna came to Darjeeling and he and Sohini decided to appoint a fashion designer for their company. They appointed Radhika, who is not aware she is being appointed for Sen Creations and Karna. Sohini also doesn't know they appointed Radhika. Karna went to the same place where he met Radhika for the first time, and coincidentally, Radhika also went there. Abhi challenged Karna to play kanamachi with him. Karna tied a handkerchief on his eyes and started finding Abhi. Karna unknowingly goes to the cliff, and as he was going to fall, Radhika saved him. Both were shocked to see each other. On the other hand, Payel was doing things according to her wish. Anuradha arranged a Puja and Payel intentionally arranged a kitty party in Sen House and asked Anuradha to postpone the Puja and Karna. Radhika starts to have again a close bond for Rini and Shuvam's marriage arrangements.

A new villain, Kali: Abhi's father, a criminal and a psychopath in Radhika and Karna's life to trouble them. Karna and his parents disguised as chefs and servant to expose Kali. After, Rini's mother, Jayati apologizes to Shuvam and his family for misbehaving. Soon after, Radhika declares she is pregnant and everyone in Sen's family enjoys the coming of Radhika's child. The Sen family arranges Kali Puja at their house for Radhika's child, and Radhika prays to Goddess Kali to tell her the way so they can expose the villain Kali. After, Sonali Kakima comes to Sen's house, apologizes for all her misdeeds, and helps Radhika and the Sen's to expose Kali's evil intentions. Radhika soon exposes Kali and punishes him. Radhika got injured due to the bomb fitted by Kali and immediately taken to the hospital. Everyone in Sen's family prays for Radhika and her child's well-being.

Argha scolds Payel for joining hands with Kali and making Radihka-Karna's life in danger. Also, she tells her if something happens to Radhika or her child he would not spare her. Radhika comes from the hospital to Sen's house, and seeing everyone sad, she questioned what has happened. Anuradha informed her out of Radhika and are child, anyone can be saved. On hearing the news, Radhika broke down. To make Radhika happy, Abhi comes back to Sen's house and enjoys with them all. Payel becomes good. Accidentally, Abhi's hand touches Radhika's womb, and she falls into unconsciousness. The doctor was immediately called and said Radhika's baby is now safe. Later, Radhika told Karna she wished to have some delicious foods and Karna in a second order foods. Payel then quarrels about the property divisions with the Sen's. Later, Radhika gives birth to a baby girl and everyone is happy. The series ended with the romantic dance of Radhika and Karna on the title song of the serial Ki Kore Bolbo Tomay.

== Cast ==
=== Main ===
- Swastika Dutta as Radhika Sen (née Mitra): stylist of Sen Creations, Karna's wife, Abhi's adoptive mother
- Krushal Ahuja as Karna Sen: CEO of Sen Creations, Jahnavi's ex-boyfriend and Radhika's husband

=== Recurring ===
- Aditi Chatterjee as Anuradha Sen aka Anu : Karna's mother, Babli's adoptive mother, Radhika and Joy's Mother-in-law, Adinath's wife.
- Sohan Bandhopadhyay as Adinath Sen aka Adi: Karna's father, Babli's father, Radhika and Joy's Father- in-law, Anuradha's husband.
- Ananya Sengupta as Nirmala Basu aka Moni: Radhika's adoptive mother, Joy's paternal aunt, Karna's adoptive mother-in-law.
- Uday Pratap Singh as Joy Basu: Karna's former close friend, Radhika's ex fiance and friend, Babli's husband and their unnamed son's father (Antagonist)
- Mrinmoy Das as Arghya Sen: Payel's husband, Misty's father, Anuradha and Adinath's elder son, Karna's elder brother.
- Manasi Sengupta as Payel Sen: Arghya's Wife, Trisha's elder sister, Misty's mother,Anuradha and Adinath's elder daughter-in-law. (Main Antagonist)
- Sayantani Sengupta as Jayati Sen: Karna's aunt and Radhika's aunt-in-law, Anuradha's younger cousin sister, Basudeb's Wife, Rini's mother.
- Shyamashis Pahari as Basudeb Sen: Karna's uncle and Radhika's uncle-in-law, Adinath's Brother, Jayati's Husband, Rini's father.
- Arpita Mukherjee as Sonali Basu: Joy and Soumi's mother, Babli's mother-in-law, Arup's wife, Kaushik and Radhika's paternal aunt.
- Arghya Mukherjee as Arup Basu: Sonali's husband, Joy and Soumi's father, Babli's father-in-law, Kaushik's paternal uncle.
- Aarush Dey as Abhi Sen: Radhika's adopted child, Kali's biological child.
- Sohini Banerjee / Kuyasha Biswas as Babli Sen Basu (née Sen): Joy's wife and their unnamed son's mother, Anuradha and Adinath's adoptive daughter, Karna's adoptive younger sister.
- Shritama Mitra as Soumi Basu: Sonali and Arup daughter, Joy's younger sister, Kaushik's paternal cousin sister.
- Olivia Malakar as Rini Sen: Subham's wife, Jayati and Basudeb's daughter, Karna's younger cousin sister.
- Rahul Dev Bose as Koushik Basu: Moni's son, Radhika's former fiancé, Riya's love interest, Joy's elder paternal cousin.
- Royshreema Das as Riya: Koushik's lover.
- Tanushree Bhattacharya Bose as Sohini Mukherjee: Karna's Personal assistant.
- Somashri Bhattacharya as Trisha: Payel's younger sister, Karna's former love interest and ex-fiańcee.
- Sanghasri Sinha Mitra as Dolly Sen (née Singh): Payel's mother-in-law, Arghya's mother, Karna's paternal aunt.
- Moyna Mukherjee as Pinky: Moni's close friend. She knew from the first time Radhika and Karna are meant to be.
- Indrajit Mazumder as Partho: Moni's caretaker and close friend.
- Jasmine Roy as Jahnavi Dutta: Karna's former lover, Mr Dutta's wife.
- Subhajit Banerjee as Mr. Dutta: Jahnavi's husband.
- Purbasha Debnath as Ishani: A designer in Sen Creation she loves Karna- Works under Radhika.
- Fahim Mirza as Dr. Dev: Abhi's doctor.
- Saugata Bandyopadhyay as Kali: Abhi's biological father, a terrorist.

== Production ==
=== Development ===
The series was producing by Shashi Mittal's Shashi Sumeet Productions company. It is the second Bengali series from the production house.

=== Filming ===
For the first promo of the series, the cast and crews traveled different parts of Darjeeling and Nepal to shoot the sequences. While Swastika said, "We wanted to show the steam engine in the promo. There was a train early in the morning at Ghum railway station. We had to wake up and start our journey almost at 3 am so that we don't miss the train". Also the team went to Tumling, Nepal, to shoot some sequences for the initial episoded. But the series is mainly filmed at sets in Kolkata.

== Adaptations ==
Language	Title	Original release	Network(s)	Last aired	Notes
Bengali	Ki Kore Bolbo Tomay কি কোরে বলবো তোমায়	16 December 2019	Zee Bangla	6 August 2021	Original
Malayalam	Pranayavarnangal പ്രണയവർണ്ണങ്ങൾ	18 October 2021	Zee Keralam	23 December 2022	Remake
