= Ranu Pelo Lottery =

Indian Bengali-language soap opera

- Promotional poster for Ranu Pelo Lottery
- Genre: Drama; Comedy
- Created by: Shree Venkatesh Films
- Screenplay by: Sarbari Ghoshal; Dialogues; Suparna Ghoshal
- Story by: Sahana
- Directed by: Swarnedu Samadder
- Creative director: Sahana
- Presented by: SVF Entertainment
- Starring: Bijoylakshmi Chatterjee; Krushal Ahuja
- Voices of: Madhuraa Bhattacharya
- Theme music composer: Upali Chattopadhay, Sobuj-Ashish
- Composer: Sobuj-Ashish
- Country of origin: India
- Original language: Bengali
- No. of seasons: 1
- No. of episodes: 268

Production
- Producers: Shrikant Mohta; Mahendra Soni
- Production location: Kolkata
- Camera setup: Multi-Camera
- Running time: 22 minutes
- Production company: Shree Venkatesh Films

Original release
- Network: Zee Bangla
- Release: 3 December 2018 – 13 December 2019

Ranu Pelo Lottery was an Indian Bengali-language television soap opera that premiered on 3 December 2018 and aired on Bengali GEC Zee Bangla.The Show starred Bijoylakshmi Chatterjee and model-actor Krushal Ahuja in lead roles; as well as Bhaskar Banerjee, Mimi Dutta and Swagata Mukherjee among others in prominent supporting roles. It marks the comeback of Bijoylakshmi Chatterjee into Bengali television.

== Cast ==
=== Main ===
- Bijaylakshmi Chatterjee as Ranu Sarkar - Titular Protagonist.
- Krushal Ahuja as Dhrubo Mitra - Pijush-Basudha's youngest son.
- Arshiya Mukherjee as Lottery- Maa Laxmi in disguise.

=== Recurring ===
- Mimi Dutta as Maa Laxmi
- Payel Deb as Aishwarya "Aish", wanted to marry Dhrubo, but had to marry his older brother.
- Swagata Mukherjee as Basudha Mitra, who want to very rich people. And she do anything for money. She has stolen Ranu's Lottery's money.
- Basanti Chatterjee / Chhanda Karanjee as Hiranmoyee Mitra aka "Thammi"
- Anirban Bhattacharya as Pijush Mitra - Basudha's Husband.
- Animesh Bhaduri as Shobhon Mitra - Pijush-Basudha's eldest son.
- Arindya Banerjee as Biman Mitra - Pijush-Basudha's second son.
- Riya Roy as Rimjhim Mitra - Pijush-Basudha's daughter.
- Bhaskar Banerjee as Ramlochon Sarkar - Ranu's father, gardener of the Mitra family.
- Pinky Mallick as Sarala Sarkar - Ranu's mother, domestic help of the Mitra family.
- Ananya Sen as Baby Mitra -Shobhon's wife.

== See also ==
- Dwiragaman
