= Binni Dhaner Khoi =

Indian television series

- Title Screen
- Genre: Drama; Family; Romance; Social; Slice Of Life
- Developed by: Leena Gangopadhyay
- Screenplay by: Leena Gangopadhyay
- Directed by: Saibal Banerjee; Arunava Adhikary
- Creative director: Leena Gangopadhyay
- Presented by: Bright Advertising Pvt. Ltd.
- Starring: Monami Ghosh; Manoj Ojha; Debottam Majumdar; Bhaswar Chatterjee
- Theme music composer: Debojyoti Mishra
- Opening theme: "Binni Dhaner Khoi" by Anweshaa
- Country of origin: India
- Original language: Bengali
- No. of episodes: 1108

Production
- Executive producers: Sumit Kumar Roy; Satyajit Chakraborty
- Producer: Saibal Banerjee
- Production locations: Kolkata; Benaras
- Cinematography: Siddhartha Mukherjee
- Editors: Sameer; Soumen
- Running time: 22 minutes
- Production company: Magic Moments Motion Pictures

Original release
- Network: ETV Bangla
- Release: 31 August 2009 – 16 March 2013

Binni Dhaner Khoi (transl. Puffed Rice of Binni Dhan) was a Bengali television soap that premiered on 31 August 2009 and initially aired on ETV Bangla. It was the first serial to be made by the production company.

One of the longest running Bengali television soap opera, the serial starred Monami Ghosh in the lead role of Mohor, Ankita Chakraborty as Mohor's sister, Gini and Manoj Ojha as Rohon, Mohor's first husband. Later on, Ghosh also portrayed Lin, Mohor and Ani's grown-up daughter. The show also starred Debottam Majumdar, Anusuya Majumdar, Rita Koyral, Sudipta Chakraborty (later replaced by Sohini Sanyal) and Diganta Bagchi in prominent supporting roles.

The show, written by Leena Gangopadhyay, deals with the heart-touching story of Mohor, a simple village girl having high intellect and a kind heart, who married the modern-day city boy Rohon, and how their relationship worked in the initial phase, and how after many misunderstandings and separation, Rohon realized his love for Mohor. However, Mohor didn't return to him and chose to love Rohon and keep his memory in her mind, but remained separated from him for lifelong. The show also encompassed how Mohor fulfilled her aspirations by becoming a doctor, and served the diseased people with all her effort and dedication, in her humanitarian profession. Later, the series showed how Mohor reunited with her estranged (long-lost) daughter, Lin; completing the heartfelt story of her life-journey.

== Premise ==
This tale tells of laughter and tears, joys and sorrows, trials and tribulations that make up the lives of three generations. 17-year old Mohor is a simple, bubbly and lively village girl. Her elder sister Gini's marriage is fixed with the modern-day, learned, charming city boy Rohon, but Gini loves someone else and elopes with her lover on the day of her marriage. So, Mohor has to take Gini's place as the bride and thus, marries Rohon at such an early age, without even having the knowledge of marriage. Over the course of their relationship, Mohor matures as a person, develops a loving relationship with Rohon's family members, especially with Rohon's mother and his paternal grandmother, Ana. Mohor later on falls in love with Rohon, who too develops a close bond with Mohor but loves Kurchi instead, his colleague at work. Kurchi gets Mohor and Rohon divorced after many plotting and scheming, and herself becomes Rohon's second wife. However, Rohon soon gets to see the true colours of Kurchi and gets irritated with her, and his love for Kurchi vanishes as well. Instead, Rohon seems to realize his feelings for Mohor to be true love, not mere affection. He tries to reunite with Mohor, but Mohor in a fit of rage refuses him, but also acknowledges her own emotional turmoil for Rohon, though she sticks to her decision. Mohor now totally focuses on her medical studies, after she is given the help and assistance by a genuine good-hearted person, whom later Kurchi falls in love with and subsequently marries, after willingly divorcing Rohon. Mohor passes her medical last year exams with flying colours, becoming an M.B.B.S. doctor. Meanwhile, a new man, Rishi enters Mohor's life and he develops an unrequited love for Mohor, much to Rohon's chagrin. However, Mohor decides to neither reconnect with Rohon nor to accept Rishi's proposal of marriage and build up her individual existence by serving people as a doctor instead.

Rohon falls ill and seeks earnestly for Mohor, who now comes to his aid. One night, Rohon and Mohor get intimate, resulting in Mohor's pregnancy. However, Rohon soon dies from his vulnerable disease. Rishi stands by Mohor in this tough time and also requests Mohor to at least let him fulfill his duty as a friend by taking the responsibility of Mohor's baby. After an emotional confrontation, Ron confesses for the first time that she respects Rishi for what he is, how much important he is in her life and the fact that she loves Rishi, only next to Rohon. Rishi for one last time proposes Mohor to be his life partner, but Mohor, getting very emotional, refuses him once again; and they part ways. Few months later, Mohor gives birth to Rohon's daughter (Lin), but she is separated from Mohor at birth, adding more to her woes.

Apart from showcasing Mohor's journey, the show also followed the story of some secondary characters, most notably Gini (Mohor's elder sister) and Ana (Rohon's grandmother). Like Mohor, Gini too did not get true love in life and had to lead her life on her own as well, later on, becoming a primary school teacher. Ana's real name is Anwara Bibi and she was revealed to be a Muslim woman, a fact that was hard to accept for her own parents, in-las and family members. But, with Mohor's help, Ana finally obtained love and respect in her family, despite revealing her actual religion and heredity.

The story takes a "21 years leap", as it introduces some new characters, primarily Lin (Mohor and Rohon's grown-up daughter), who returns from US to conduct an assignment, but incidentally gets to know her roots and her true background. The sprightly Lin falls in love with Eshan (Kurchi's son) and the story deals with how Lin handles her marriage with Eshan amidst chaos and misunderstandings. The story arc also follows Mohor's remaining years of life as she finally reunites with her long-lost daughter, Lin, who also, upon clearing all misunderstandings, accepts Mohor as her mother and loves her from a depth. In the final episodes, it is shown how Mohor rejuvenates her initial days of life, all her quests to achieve stability and how she served the people generously, as she finally dies in peace at 46 years of age, putting an end to her lifelong struggle.

== Cast ==
=== Main ===
- Monami Ghosh as Dr. Kojagori Mukherjee aka Mohor - Rohon's first ex-wife, Ani's second ex-wife, Ranjan's third wife, Rishi's love interest, Lin's mother
  - Lin Banerjee - Mohor and Ani's daughter, Ishaan's wife, Chiru's love interest
- Manoj Ojha as Rohan Banerjee (Deceased) - Mohor's 1st ex-husband, Kurchi's ex-husband, Ishaan's father
- Pushpendu Roy as Ishaan, Lin's husband, Rohan and Kurchi's son.
- Debottam Majumdar as Rishi Ganguly - Mohor's love interest, Chiru's father / Chiranjit Ganguly aka Chiru - Rishi's son, Lin's lover

=== Recurring ===
- Sudipta Chakraborty / Sohini Sanyal as Kurchi Majumdar - Rohan's second (divorced) wife, Akash 's mother, Lin's mother-in-law.
- Bhaswar Chatterjee as Ani, Mohor's second husband (deceased)
- Subhrajit Dutta as Ranjan, Mohor's third husband
- Ankita Chakraborty as Saraswati Mukherjee aka Gini - Mohor's elder sister.
- Suman Banerjee as Gini's love interest turned husband.
- Anusuya Majumdar as Anwara Bibi aka Ana - Rohon's aunt (his elder paternal uncle's wife)
- Arun Bannerjee
- Rita Koiral as Rohon's mother, Mohor & Kurchi's ex-mother-in-law
- Bhaskar Banerjee
- Rajashree Bhowmik
- Debshankar Haldar as Gini and Mohor's father
- Tanuka Chatterjee as Gini and Mohor's mother
- Chandan Sen
- Diganta Bagchi as Somnath, Kurchi's second husband, Bubu's father.
- Rita Dutta Chakraborty
- Arghya Mukherjee
- Sabitri Chatterjee
- Anushree Das as Kamma - Mohor's aunt
- Ashok Bhattacharya
- Manjusree Ganguly as Lekha
- Soma Dey
- Aishi Bhattacharya
- Suchismita Chowdhury
- Lovely Maitra as Bubu
- Anirban Guha
