= Phool Pishi O Edward =

2026 Indian Bengali murder mystery film

- Theatrical release poster
- Directed by: Nandita Roy; Shiboprosad Mukherjee
- Screenplay by: Zinia Sen
- Story by: Zinia Sen
- Dialogues by: Zinia Sen
- Additional dialogues: Samragnee Bandyopadhyay
- Additional screenplay: Samragnee Bandyopadhyay
- Produced by: Nandita Roy; Shiboprosad Mukherjee
- Cinematography: Animesh Ghorui
- Edited by: Malay Laha
- Music by: Joy Sarkar
- Production company: Windows Production
- Distributed by: Windows Production
- Release date: 29 May 2026
- Running time: 139 minutes
- Country: India
- Language: Bengali

Phool Pishi O Edward (transl. Phool Aunt and Edward) is a 2026 Indian Bengali-language murder mystery drama film. Directed by Nandita Roy and Shiboprosad Mukherjee, the film has been written by Zinia Sen. Samragnee Bandyopadhyay has written the additional dialogues and additional screenplay. Produced under the banner of Windows Production, the film stars an ensemble cast of Sohini Sengupta, Arjun Chakraborty, Raima Sen, Shyamoupti Mudly, Sahebb Chatterjee, Rajatava Dutta, Ananya Chatterjee, Soumya Mukherjee and Rishav Basu.

The film is about a murder mystery unfolding in a zamindar household, where an aunt uncovers hidden truths behind the suspicious death of the zamindar. The principal photography began on 4 January 2026 at the Mahishadal Rajbari. Joy Sarkar has composed the music of the film. Animesh Ghorui did the cinematography while Malay Laha handled the editing. It marked the film debut of Shyamoupti Mudly. The film was released in the theatres on 29 May 2026. It opened to mixed reviews from the critics and positive reviews from the audiences.

== Synopsis ==
Phool Pishi O Edward began on the day of Zamindar Manindra Chandra Nandy's wedding celebrations. But the celebrations ceased when Manindra died under suspicious circumstances. His sudden death initiated a murder investigation. As the investigation proceeded, several members of the household emerged as possible suspects.

The suspects included Manindra's estranged wife Aditi, his fiancée Binita, his brother Jogendra, his son Somoy, his illegitimate son Raja, and his mother Hasi Debi. Through Phool Pishi's careful observations, hidden relationships and long-buried family secrets are gradually revealed, finally bringing the truth behind the mysterious death.

== Cast ==
- Sohini Sengupta as Phool Pishi
- Arjun Chakraborty as Zamindar Manindra Chandra Nandy
- Koneenica Banerjee as Rajlakshmi, Manindra's first wife
- Raima Sen as Aditi, Manindra's estranged second wife
- Shyamoupti Mudly as Binita, Aditi's sister and Manindra's bride for his third marriage
- Sahebb Chatterjee as Jogendra Chandra Nandy, Manindra's step-brother
- Rajatava Dutta as Balmiki Ghorai, an investigating police officer
- Ananya Chatterjee as Putli Bai, a courtesan
- Soumya Mukherjee as Somoy Chandra Nandy, Manindra and Rajlakshmi's son
- Rishav Basu as Raja, Manindra and Putli Bai's illegitimate son
- Anamika Saha as Hasi Debi, Manindra's mother
- Debesh Chattopadhyay as Birendra Chandra Nandy
- Raju Dhar
- Atanu Barman
- Sandip Bhattacharya

=== Cameo ===
- Mimi Chakraborty as Segun

== Production ==
=== Announcement ===
To commemorate the 25 years' completion of the Windows Production House, Phool Pishi O Edward was announced on 1 January 2026, along with two other projects — Bohurupi: The Golden Daku and Bhanupriya Bhooter Hotel — all of which were slated to release in 2026. Phool Pishi O Edward also marked the 25th project of the Shiboprosad–Nandita director duo.

=== Development ===
"Phool Pishi's cat is named Edward. The directors once wondered if this name would work at all. Since the target audience is Bengali, it was advisable to choose a Bengali name. Once, I named the cat Birbal. At that time, the name of the film was "Phool Pishi and Birbal". But then, Nandita Roy noticed that, the way Sohini Sengupta pronounces the word Edward sounds good, and it's a completely contrasting name with Phool Pishi. That's why, Phool Pishi and Edward was finalised as the title for the film."

— Zinia Sen, regarding finalising the title for the film

On the eve of International Women's Day, the first poster from the film was released on 7 March 2026. The poster featured all the female leads in the film — Sohini Sengupta, Raima Sen, Ananya Chatterjee, Koneenica Banerjee, Shyamoupti Mudly, and Anamika Saha.

The first character poster from the film was released on 18 March 2026. It featured Arjun Chakraborty in the role of zamindar Manindra Chandra Nandy. The character poster for Raima Sen as Aditi was released on 1 May 2026.

Shyamoupti Mudly's character poster in the role of Binita was dropped on 2 May 2026. Rishav Basu's character poster as Raja was released on 7 May 2026. On 11 May 2026, Soumya Chatterjee's character poster as Somoy Chandra Nandy was released. The character poster of Koneenica Banerjee as Rajlakshmi was dropped on 24 May 2026.

On 25 April 2026, the character poster for Shahebb Chattopadhyay in the role of Jogendra Chandra Nandy was released. Rajatava Dutta's character poster as an investigative police officer, Balmiki, was released on 29 April 2026.

=== Casting ===
Phool Pishi O Edward marked Raima Sen's first collaboration with the Shiboprosad–Nandita director duo. In an interview, Sen revealed that she agreed to the film because of its atmosphere, emotional depth, and her character, which exists between memory and reality. This film was also Rajatava Dutta's first collaboration with the directors.

Arjun Chakraborty was cast in this film in the role of zamindar Manindra Chandra Nandy. It marked his first large-screen collaboration with Shiboprosad Mukherjee, thirty years after the soap opera Ghum Nei (1996).

This film represented Koneenica Banerjee's third collaboration with the directors after Haami (2018) and Konttho (2019). This film also marked Rishav Basu's first large-screen collaboration with the directors, ten years after Anupam Roy's music video Histrogen (2016). This film was Shahebb Chatterjee's third collaboration with the director duo after Gotro (2019) and Brahma Janen Gopon Kommoti (2020).

=== Pre-production ===
Anupam Chatterjee served as the costume designer of the film. He was roped in just 3-4 days before the film, when the previously appointed costume designer suddenly exited from the project. Mridul Baidya and Saswati Karmakar handled the production design. Sushmita Banerjee handled the dance choreography. Joy Sarkar was appointed as the music director for the film. Srijato Bandyopadhyay was roped in to render the lyrics.

For her role, Raima Sen learnt how to grind vegetables and spices into a paste using the traditional shil-nora, and how to cut vegetables with a boti. She practised other household chores while wearing a saree in the traditional zamindari style. Sen also practised some basic puja rituals, which the ladies in a traditional household usually perform. Shyamoupti Mudly learnt Kathak for her role in the film. To fit into his role, Sahebb Chatterjee reduced his weight through cardio, exercise and yoga.

=== Filming ===
Principal photography started on 4 January 2026. It was completed within a small period of 15 days. Almost all the filming was done in and around the Mahishadal Rajbari in East Midnapore. During the shooting period, the cast and crew stayed at a hotel in Haldia and travelled every morning to the shooting location. The filming schedules were usually from 10 am to 11 pm.

After Ananya Chatterjee was offered the role of "Putli Bai" in the film, she postponed her knee surgery scheduled in Chennai. Despite being trained in Kathak, she started taking additional training from Sushmita Mishra to suit the tonal demands of the film. Avoiding her doctor's warnings, Ananya took painkillers and shot for her solo dance sequence in the film. But at the end of the shot, she lost consciousness owing to extreme pain.

While filming an early morning rooftop dance sequence, Shyamoupti Mudly's skin below her feet got peeled and started to bleed, owing to the friction on the ice-cold rooftop surface. Her injury was treated with spray and first-aid on the set. After brief treatment, she retook the shot and completed her sequence.

On 8 March 2026, on the occasion of International Women's Day, the cast and crew of the film celebrated the wrap-up of Phool Pishi O Edward. The event took place at the Polo Floatel in Kolkata.

=== Post-production ===
The dubbing for all the characters was done by the respective actors in February 2026, at Window Production's studio in South Kolkata. On 12 February 2026, Shyamoupti Mudly did some parts of her dubbing. On 19 February 2026, 5 days after her marriage, she completed the rest of her dubbing.

== Soundtrack ==
Phool Pishi O Edward

Soundtrack album by Joy Sarkar
- Released: 2026
- Studio: Audio Lake Studio
- Genre: Film soundtrack
- Length: 15:37
- Language: Bengali
- Labels: Times Music Bangla; Windows

Joy Sarkar has composed the music of the film. The lyrics have been penned by Srijato. Traditional lyrics have been used in one song — "Launch Chole".

The music rights of this film and seven upcoming projects of Windows Production, were bought by Junglee Music. The musical celebration of the soundtrack of the film was held at the Aerosky Bar & Kitchen in Kolkata on 17 June 2026.

The first song "Moner Chabi Re" was released on 22 April 2026. The second song "Launch Chole" was released on 2 June 2026. The third single "Chole Jeo Na" was dropped on 10 May 2026. The fourth song "Aampata Jaampata" was released on 23 May 2026.

Track listing
No.	Title	Singer(s)	Length
1.	"Moner Chabi Re"	Sutirtha Chakraborty, Bonnie Basu	3:16
2.	"Launch Chole"	Dipannita Acharya, Shreshtha Das, Pousali Banerjee	4:04
3.	"Chole Jeo Na"	Anasmita Ghosh	4:32
4.	"Aampata Jaampata"	Anwesshaa, Joy Sarkar	3:45
Total length:			15:37

== Marketing ==
The teaser of Phool Pishi O Edward was released on 14 April 2026, on the eve of Poila Baisakh. The trailer was dropped on 15 May 2026. Bonnie Chakraborty composed the background score in the trailer. The trailer launch event was held at Taj Taal Kutir in New Town, Kolkata.

The premiere of Phool Pishi O Edward took place on 29 May 2026, at Cinepolis of the Acropolis Mall in Kolkata. The event was attended by other frequent collaborators with Windows Production, including Abir Chatterjee and Ritabhari Chakraborty.

== Release ==
The film was released in the theatres on 29 May 2026.

== Reception ==
=== Critical reception ===
Eshna Bhattacharya of The Times of India rated the film 3.5/5 stars and wrote "Phool Pishi O Edward is ambitious, uneven, and often compelling. It stumbles in parts, but its performances, atmosphere, and thematic clarity ensure it lingers well beyond its runtime." She praised the tonal contradiction used as an aesthetic element, the music, background score, vibrant visuals, poignant representation of the mansion, lighting design, production design, costumes, performance of every lead actor and the various themes that have been symbolically employed throughout the film. But she bemoaned the slow pacing in the second half, over-explanation in certain sequences, lack of tonal consistency and the unnecessary pre-interval stretch.

Agnivo Niyogi of The Telegraph reviewed the film and opined "The film is less interested in shocking audiences with twists and more invested in exploring the emotional damage caused by patriarchy and repression. Beneath the mystery lies a story about women pushed to their limits and controlled until they finally begin reclaiming power." He applauded the film's casting, performances of all the actors, the dark humour and it's take on patriarchy but criticized the occasionally faltering screenplay, poorly explored subplots and the lack of suspense in certain sequences.

Udisha from Indulge Express reviewed the film and noted "More than a thriller, Phool Pishi O Edward is a story of women, of different ages, all tied down by patriarchy, breaking loose and owning the narrative." She praised the performance of the whole cast, the grand sets, cinematography, music, the message delivered regarding societal female oppression and the backstory provided for each of the characters but bemoaned the film for losing the it's thrill after the first half, lack of a cohesive plot, meaningless ending, lack of proper climax factor, several loose endings, multiple incomplete subplots, the confusing timeline and mismatched costume design with respect to the timeline of the film.

Subhash K Jha reviewed the film for Bolly Spice and rated it 3.5 out of 5 stars. Jha highlighted "The vast cast of veterans and youngsters merge effectively in a film which has so much to say, and says it with confidence and grace. The scene stealer is the cat, Edward." He appreciated the well constructed zamindari environment, evocative cinematography, vivid frames, emotive acting of all the cast and the comic reliefs but criticized the screenplay for juxtaposing too many characters. Ranjan Bandyopadhyay of Sangbad Pratidin reviewed the film and applauded the slapstick humour, the climax and the performance of the whole cast but bemoaned the slow pacing in the second half.
