= Jazz City =

- Poster
- Genre: Historical drama
- Written by: Soumik Sen
- Directed by: Soumik Sen
- Starring: Arifin Shuvoo; Sauraseni Maitra; Shataf Figar
- Composers: Arka Mukherjee; Diptarka Bose
- Country of origin: India
- Original languages: Bangla; Hindi
- No. of seasons: 1
- No. of episodes: 10

Production
- Executive producers: Samar Roy; Shayon Chakraborty
- Producer: Arpita Chatterjee
- Production location: India
- Cinematography: Ron Mukherjee; Vishal Verma
- Editor: Amit Ray

Original release
- Network: SonyLIV
- Release: 19 March 2026

Jazz City is an Indian Bengali language Historical spy thriller television series created and directed by Soumik Sen. The series star Arifin Shuvoo, Sauraseni Maitra and Shataf Figar. the series premiered on SonyLIV on 19 March 2026.

== Premise ==
Set in 1971 Calcutta, a jazz club becomes the stage for a revolutionary awakening, where music intertwines with language, identity, and the struggle that culminates in the birth of Bangladesh during a defining historical moment.

== Cast ==
- Arifin Shuvoo as Jimmy Roy
- Sauraseni Maitra as Sheela
- Shataf Figar as General Hanif
- Alexandra Taylor as Pamela
- Santanu Ghatak as IB officer Sinha
- Sayandeep Sengupta as Rambahadur
- Soumen Chakraborty as Manash
- Tanika Basu as Kaberi
- Vinay Sharma as Alvarej
- Shahir Raj as Ramiz
- Amit Saha
- Aniruddha Gupta

== Production ==
They started shooting in 2024. The trailer was released on 16 February 2026.

== Release ==
Earlier it was scheduled to release on 6 February 2026, but it was postponed to 19 March 2026.

== Episodes ==
Having 10 Episodes

== Reception ==
Rahul Desai of The Hollywood Reporter India observed that it is "All decked up with nowhere to go." Shubhra Gupta of The Indian Express gave 1.5 stars out of 5 and said that "There was potential here, but it is let down by the length and laxity, a rare misfire for SonyLIV, which has mastered the art of creating and presenting solid period drama."

Deepa Gahlot of Rediff.com rated it 2.5/5 satrs and said that "Jazz City could have been enjoyable had it not been so densely over-plotted and unevenly executed." Nandini Ramnath of Scroll.in observed that "Sen’s adda approach to the plotting results in a rambling, muddled and repetitive series that takes 10 episodes for what could have been explored in half the duration."

Vinamra Mathur of Firstpost gave 2.5 stars out of 5 and said that "Jazz City tries to tick too many boxes at once. It wants to be a political thriller, it wants to be a commentary on politicians and the people in power. It also wants to be a swanky web-series brimming with style and sass." Santanu Das of Hindustan Times gave 2 stars out of 5 and said, "Jazz City means well, but how long can it survive just on the basis of that? It is a show that sinks under its own weight and is never fully able to commit to the danger, restlessness, and anxiety of a troubled socio-political climate. It is too neat, too calculated, and sadly, too eager to reach a resolution."

Abhishek Srivastava of The Times of India rated it 3/5 stars and said that "‘Jazz City' is refined, patient storytelling elevated by strong performances and a rich musical canvas. Worth watching if you’re drawn to layered, culturally rooted historical dramas." Troy Ribeiro of Free Press Journal writes that "Jazz City is ambitious, atmospheric, and intermittently engaging, but ultimately uneven. It captures the mood of a turbulent time without fully harnessing its dramatic potential. For all its visual finesse and thematic richness, it remains curiously distant, more observed than felt. Overall, the series hums with promise but rarely soars." Jannatul Naym Pieal of The Daily Star criticize it by calling it "The Bangladesh Liberation War is one such event. More than five decades on, it keeps showing up in Indian films and series -- as a narrative real estate reshaped, reframed, and almost always centred on India."

== See also ==
- SonyLIV original programming
