= Krushal Ahuja =

Indian television actor (born 1994)

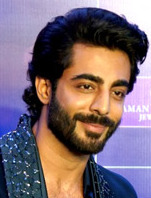
- Born: 1 September 1994 (age 32); Faizabad, Uttar Pradesh, India
- Occupations: Actor; Model
- Years active: 2017–present
- Known for: Ki Kore Bolbo Tomay; Rishton Ka Manjha; Jhanak

Krushal Ahuja (born 1 September 1994) is an Indian television actor who is best known for his roles in Ki Kore Bolbo Tomay, Rishton Ka Manjha and Jhanak.

== Early life ==
Ahuja was born on 1 September 1994 in Faizabad, Uttar Pradesh.

== Career ==
Ahuja started his acting career in 2017 with a short film Bidayi. Shortly, he made his television debut with the lead role of Dhrubo Mitra in Zee Bangla series Ranu Pelo Lottery opposite Bijaylakshmi Chatterjee.

Ahuja's break through came in 2019 with the Zee Bangla show Ki Kore Bol bo Tomay. He then appeared in 2021 with Rishton Ka Manjha .

From November 2023 to June 2025, he playing the lead role of Aniruddh Bose in StarPlus show Jhanak. From September 2025 to December 2025, he was signed to play Aviraj in Colors TV's Binddii. Since March 2026, he playing Yuvraj in StarPlus show Taara.

== Media image ==
In 2020, Ahuja was placed 1st in the Calcutta Times's Most Desirable Men on Television. In 2026, he was listed in 40 Under 40 by the Indian edition of Variety.

== Filmography ==
=== Films ===
Year	Title	Role	Notes	Language	Refs
2017	Bidayi	Nakul	Short film	Hindi	
2026	Dear D		Feature film	Bengali	

=== Television ===
Year	Title	Role	Notes	Language	Refs
2018–2019	Ranu Pelo Lottery	Dhrubo Mitra	Lead role	Bengali	
2019–2021	Ki Kore Bolbo Tomay	Karna Sen	Lead role	Bengali	
2021–2022	Rishton Ka Manjha	Arjun Agarwal	Lead role	Hindi	
2023–2025	Jhanak	Aniruddha Bose	Lead role	Hindi	
2025	Binddii	Aviraj Mathur	Lead role	Hindi	
2026	Taara	Yuvraj Shekhawat	Lead role	Hindi	

== Awards and nominations ==
Year	Award	Category	Show	Result	Ref.
2026	Indian Television Academy Awards	Best Actor Popular	Jhanak|		

== See also ==
- List of Indian actors
- List of Indian television actors
