= Bhaskar Banerjee =

Indian Bengali actor

- Occupation: Actor
- Years active: 1985–present

Bhaskar Banerjee is an Indian Bengali actor. He has acted in many television serials and films including Kache Aye Shoi, Jol Nupur, Potol Kumar Gaanwala, Dhulokona, Swamir Ghar, Angshumaner Chhobi, Obhishopto Nighty,and Double Feluda.

== Career ==
Banerjee started his career as an actor in 1985. Banerjee as an actor has also directed an upcoming Indian Bengali-language drama film "Ektu Aalor Khonje" which was produced by Curlyvine Films & Productions Pvt Ltd

== Filmography ==
=== Films ===
| Year | Film | Role |
|---|---|---|
| 1991 | Nawab | |
| 1991 | Bourani | |
| 1991 | Sajani Go Sajani | |
| 1992 | Shet Patharer Thala | |
| 1992 | Nabarupa | |
| 1994 | Biswas Abiswas | |
| 1999 | Swamir Ghar | |
| 2008 | Tintorettor Jishu | Nabakumar Neogi |
| 2009 | Angshumaner Chhobi | Somnath |
| 2011 | Egaro | |
| 2012 | 8:08 Er Bongaon Local | Ananta's Office Colleague |
| 2013 | Rupkatha Noy | Prasanta |
| 2014 | Aamar Aami | Chandrima's father |
| 2014 | Obhishopto Nighty | Bimal Hore |
| 2016 | Double Feluda | Subir Ranjan Dutta |
| 2019 | Network | Subrata |
| 2024 | Bohurupi | Bank Manager |

=== Television ===
| Year | Show | Role |
|---|---|---|
| 2013–2014 | Kache Aye Shoi | Ashok |
| 2013–2015 | Jol Nupur | Bhombol |
| 2015–2017 | Potol Kumar Gaanwala | Chandan Malik |
| 2017 | Tobu Mone Rekho | Rajat's father |
| 2018 | Ardhangini | Raghunath Bhattacharjee |
| 2018–2019 | Ranu Pelo Lottery | Ramlochon Sarkar |
| 2019 | Durga Durgeshwari | Deendayal |
| 2019–2020 | Guriya Jekhane Guddu Sekhane | Sukumar's Father |
| 2020–2021 | Prothoma Kadambini | Raybahadur Sardakanta Deb |
| 2021 | Desher Maati | Abin Bose |
| 2021–2022 | Dhulokona | Somraj "Gablu" Ganguly |
| 2021–2022 | Uma | Sunando Das |
| 2022–2023 | Ekka Dokka | Dr. Ronodip Sengupta |
| 2025–present | Chirosokha | |
| 2025–present | Bhole Baba Par Kare Ga | |

=== Web series ===
| Year | Title | Role | Platform |
|---|---|---|---|
| 2020 | Tansener Tanpura | Hemanta Ganguly | Hoichoi |
