= Guriya Jekhane Guddu Sekhane =

- Promotional poster
- Genre: Romance; Comedy
- Created by: Shree Venkatesh Films
- Screenplay by: Arpita Paul; Dialogues; Soumya Pakrashi
- Story by: Sahana
- Directed by: Anupam Hari, Rajat Paul
- Creative director: Sahana
- Presented by: SVF Entertainment
- Starring: Abhirup Sen; Prithaa Ghosh; Jeetu Kamal; Pratyusha Paul
- Voices of: Upali Chattopadhyay; Sobuj Asish
- Theme music composer: Upali Chattopadhyay
- Composer: Upali Chattopadhyay
- Country of origin: India
- Original language: Bengali
- No. of episodes: 413

Production
- Producers: Shrikant Mohta; Mahendra Soni
- Production location: Kolkata
- Camera setup: Multi-Camera
- Running time: 22 minutes
- Production company: Shree Venkatesh Films

Original release
- Network: Star Jalsha
- Release: 21 January 2019 – 14 March 2020

Related
- Prothoma Kadambini

Guriya Jekhane Guddu Sekhane is an Indian Bengali-language television soap opera that premiered on 21 January 2019 and aired on Bengali GEC Star Jalsha. The show, produced by Shree Venkatesh Films initially starred child artists Abhirup Sen and Pritha Ghosh in lead roles. Guriya Jekhane Guddu Sekhane was a story of two orphans who grow up together in an orphanage in North Bengal. The show then starred Arya Dasgupta (replaced by Uday Pratap Singh Rajput), Pratyusha Paul and Jeetu Kamal in lead roles. It ended on 14 March 2020 and got replaced by another SVF-produced show Prothoma Kadambini.

== Plot ==
The story is about two orphans, Guriya and Guddu, who fight against all obstacles together to fulfill each other's dreams. As they grow up together in an orphanage in North Bengal, with them evolves a friendship of a lifetime. When Guriya meets with an accident and is diagnosed with a serious illness, Guddu decides to unite her with her family, making all ends meet. The story revolves around how Guddu, with all his might and love for Guriya, goes out of his way, and embarks upon a journey to find Guriya's family in a faraway city. However, they later get separated when he brings her to her family. But when she grows up, she attempts to find him.

== Cast ==
=== Main ===
- Pratyusha Paul as Rikhia Bose aka Guriya
  - Pritha Ghosh as Child Guriya
- Jeetu Kamal as Sukumar Bose
- Arya Dasgupta / Pratyush Kumar Bandyopadhyay / Uday Pratap Singh as Guddu/Rocky Rockstar/Raju Bose
  - Abhirup Sen as Child Guddu

=== Recurring ===
- Sritama Bhattacharjee as Mohua, Sukumar's first wife
- Krittika Chakraborty as Phooljhuri
- Bhaskar Banerjee as Sukumar's Father
- Somashree Chaki as Sukumar's mother
- Jojo Mukherjee as Romila Chetri/Herembha
- Pushpita Mukherjee as Nirmala
- Bhola Tamang as Mr. Bonjo
- Veronica Mona Dutta as Abira Mukherjee
- Bhaswar Chatterjee as Ankush
- Raja Chatterjee as Vinayak Mukherjee
- Debottam Majumder as Abira's Husband, Guriya's Biological Father
- Alivia Sarkar as Abira's elder sister
- Riyanka Dasgupta as Abira's sister in law
- Mousumi Saha as Bijlirani
- Piyali Basu as Twarita Bose

== Production ==
The show is produced by Mahendra Soni, co-founder and Director of SVF.

=== Music ===
The music has been composed by Upali Chattopadhyay and Sobuj Asish.
