= Ektu Aalor Khonje =

- Directed by: Bhaskar Banerjee
- Screenplay by: Bhaskar Banerjee
- Starring: Mahendra Dan; Ipsita Moitra; Pavel Dutta; Debraj Sengupta; Kakali Dan; Prabir Halder
- Cinematography: Bhaskar Banerjee
- Edited by: Bhaskar Banerjee
- Production company: Curlyvine Films & Productions Pvt Ltd
- Country: India
- Language: Bengali

Ektu Aalor Khonje (In Search of Light) is an upcoming Indian Bengali-language drama film directed by Bhaskar Banerjee and produced by Curlyvine Films & Productions Pvt Ltd.

Production was interrupted due to funding problems, taking nearly five years for completion. The film was shot primarily on location on a limited budget, featuring mostly amateur actors and an inexperienced crew. A group of ten people fulfilled all of the production roles.

== Plot summary ==
Local holy man Dadathakur is a teacher and healer, providing guidance and philosophical instruction to generations of villagers and is regarded with great esteem by all who meet him. He is a locus of village wisdom and imparts philosophical guidances from a variety of sources in his effort to explain the vagaries and iniquities of daily life and toil in the village, set in West Bengal.

Yet mystery surrounds his beginnings, and it is Dadathakur's past that film director Banerjee explores in this upcoming indie production. Long before becoming known for village wisdom, Dadathakur was an impoverished writer by the name of Rishob who was married to a young beautiful woman named Manoshi. Due to the dire circumstances and poverty of their early lives, Manoshi dies unexpectedly, leaving Rishob itinerant and without purpose in life. This event scars his soul and causes him to question the material struggle of existence and the importance of life and death in the face of such injustice and complacency on the part of the universe to his sadness.

To rediscover himself and his purpose in this world, Rishob becomes Dadathakur, and moves to Jibanpur village where he learns and perfects his craft and life's wisdom. The film "In Search of Light" (Ektu aalor khonje) begins thirty years into Dadathakur's ministry in the village. Rishob's new life as a holy man is complicated when his son Sourjyo, long lost to him and time, arrives in the village of Jibanpur after receiving reliable word from a family friend that his father Rishob is alive and well, dwelling somewhere in disguise. Dadathakur is once again forced to face questions of life and death as well as the meaning of it all as he confronts his son from a previous life and reveals the secrets of Rishob's past to a man he only has just met, shedding the pretense of Dadathakur to once again become the hobbled man that led him on the path to spiritual enlightenment in the first place.

== Cast and crew ==
- Mahendra Daan as Dadathakur
- Pavel Dutta as Rishob
- Ipsita Moitra as Manoshi
- Debraj Sengupta as Sourjyo
- Susmita Bhattacharya as Indrani
- Rana Banerjee as Manik Sarkar
- Kakoli Daan as Manju
- Riya Singh as Komli
- Rohan Banerjee as Kajol
- Prabir Halder as Sonaton

== Filming and production ==
The first phase of filming took place in Belun, a village in Katwa, West Bengal. Production was subsequently suspended after actor Pavel Dutta was diagnosed with cancer. Dutta died several months later.

The production resumed more than a year later with Mahendra Daan joining the cast. His inclusion required changes to the story and casting. The second phase of filming took place in Purulia, with further shooting conducted intermittently because of funding constraints.

As the story is primarily set in a rural village, the production relied largely on location shooting and required extensive location scouting. A village in Arambagh was eventually selected as a principal location for scenes involving the protagonist, Dadathakur.
