= Alor Kole =

2023 Indian television series

- Genre: Drama; Romance; Supernatural; Thriller
- Created by: Ideas Creations
- Written by: Arpita Pal (Dialogues)
- Screenplay by: Srabasti Basu
- Story by: Yuvraj Bhattacharya
- Directed by: Tamal Maity; Barun Mondal (Head Assistant Director)
- Creative director: Dwaipayan Majumder
- Starring: Somu Sarkar; Rishita Nandi; Swikriti Majumder; Koushik Roy
- Opening theme: "Mishe jeno thakte pari se alor kole"
- Composer: Amit Chattopadhyay
- Country of origin: India
- Original language: Bengali
- No. of episodes: 174

Production
- Executive producers: Debolina Saha; Sunanda Samanta (Ideas Creation); Paromita & Aniruddha (Zee Bangla)
- Producers: Prosenjit Chatterjee; Yuvraj Bhattacharya; Srimonto Kumar Chattopadhyay
- Cinematography: Gobinda Dalal
- Editors: Riyaz & Dipon
- Camera setup: Multi-camera
- Running time: 22 minutes
- Production company: Ideas Creations

Original release
- Network: Zee Bangla
- Release: 27 November 2023 – 22 June 2024

Related
- Yaaradi Nee Mohini

Alor Kole (transl. In The Lap Of Light) is a 2023 Indian Bengali-language romantic supernatural drama television series that premiered on 27 November 2023 on Zee Bangla. The series was produced by Ideas Creations. It starred Somu Sarkar, Rishita Nandi, Swikriti Majumder, and Koushik Roy. It was an official remake of the Tamil TV series Yaaradi Nee Mohini. Unlike the Tamil original version, which spanned 1,252 episodes, Alor Kole concluded abruptly with 174 episodes on 22 June 2024, along with the shows Kar Kachhe Koi Moner Kotha and Ashtami.

== Plot ==
Aditya's first wife, Alo, dies. The media and his daughter, Pupul, blame him for her death. As Alo's soul has not yet achieved salvation, she wanders the family home, watching over and protecting Pupul. Aditya's stepmother, Indira, wishes for him to remarry and chooses her friend's daughter, Megha.

Meanwhile, Radha, a girl from Navadeep, saves Pupul several times and stays as a guest in the house. Aditya eventually agrees to marry Megha for Pupul's sake, but the marriage is cancelled by Alo, Radha, and Pupul. Finally, under pressure from Alo, Aditya marries Radha but states he is unable to accept her as his wife, as he remains in love with Alo.

The show follows Radha, Aditya, and Pupul's bond as they overcome many hurdles with help from Alo. However, aside from Alo and Radha, no one knows about Megha's ill intentions. Radha goes to Navadeep to gather evidence against Megha.

There, Megha captures Radha and tries to drown her in a river, but Aditya's uncle, Ajay, stops Megha and saves Radha. Basundhara and Ajay reunite and Megha is arrested, but Indira saves her. Megha then attempts to kill Aditya by pushing him from a roof; as a result, Aditya is paralysed.

Alo finally achieves salvation, and Pupul is able to see and touch her for the last time. Due to business problems, the Sen family is forced to leave their home, but Radha's childhood friend Rishi, now a lawyer, helps them regain it. Radha and Aditya confess their love for one another and reunite. However, Rishi is secretly in love with Radha; believing that Aditya killed Alo, he does not think Aditya deserves Radha. In an attempt to test Aditya's loyalty, Rishi sends a girl named Debi, who looks like Alo, to the Sen family home, with Debi claiming to be Alo. Radha discovers this and, with Debi's help, tries to identify Alo's real murderer. Megha intervenes, exposing Debi's true identity and accusing Radha and Rishi. Finally, Alo returns, saves Radha, and reveals that Megha was her murderer. Megha is arrested and Alo leaves the world for good, allowing the Sen family to live happily ever after.

== Cast ==
=== Main ===
- Somu Sarkar as Radha Sen (née Bhattacharjee) – Bimal's daughter; Adi's second wife; Pupul's step-mother.
- Swikriti Majumder in a dual role:
  - Late Alo Sen (Ghost) – Rabi's sister; Adi's first wife; Pupul's mother.
  - Debi – Alo's look-alike.
- Koushik Roy as Aditya "Adi" Sen – Bijay's son; Indira's step-son; Raja and Nandini's half-brother; Alo's widower; Radha's husband; Pupul's father.
- Rishita Nandi as Roshni "Pupul" Sen – Adi and Alo's daughter; Radha's step-daughter.
- Ananya Das as Megha – Parvati's daughter; Aditya's obsessive lover; Alo and Radha's rival.

=== Recurring ===
- Tulika Basu as Indira Sen – Bijay's second wife; Raja and Nandini's mother; Aditya's step-mother; Pupul's step-grandmother; Parvati's friend.
- Manishankar Banerjee as Bijay Sen – Indira's husband; Adi, Raja and Nandini's father; Pupul's grandfather.
- Swagata Mukherjee as Basundhara Sen – Adi, Raja and Nandini's aunt; Indira's elder sister-in-law; Ajay's estranged wife.
- Sumanta Mukherjee as Dr. Ajay Sen – Bijay's elder brother; Basundhara's estranged husband.
- Aditya Chowdhury as Raja Sen – Bijay and Indira's son; Nandini's brother; Adi's half-brother.
- Ayesha Bhattacharya as Rajnandini "Nandini" Sen (née Sen) – Bijay and Indira's daughter; Raja's sister; Adi's half-sister; Abhra's wife.
- Debomoy Mukherjee as Abhra – Nandini's husband.
- Subhadra Mukherjee as Parvati – Megha's mother; Indira's friend.
- Sagarika Roy as Alo and Rabi's mother; Pupul's grandmother.
- Srideep Bhattacharjee as Rabi – Alo's brother.
- Brinda Mukherjee as Jenny D'Souza – Megha's friend; Sen family's ill-wisher.
- Rishav Basu as Rishiraj Roy – A lawyer; Radha's senior and friend.

=== Guest appearance ===
"Aiburobhater Jomjomat Udjapon" special episode

- Miss Jojo as herself
- Rahul Dev as himself
- Titiksha Das as Megh Roy from Icche Putul
- Shweta Mishra as Mayuri Roy from Icche Putul
- Manali Dey as Shimul Mitra from Kar Kachhe Koi Moner Kotha
- Sritama Bhattacharjee as Putul Banerjee from Kar Kachhe Koi Moner Kotha
- Aratrika Maity as Raipurna Mukherjee from Mithijhora
- Debadrita Basu as Nilanjana Roy from Mithijhora
- Kheyali Mondal as Mili Sanyal from Mili
- Anubhav Kanjilal as Arjun Sanyal from Mili

"Baishakhi Hullor" special episode

- Divyani Mondal as Phulki Roy Chowdhury from Phulki
- Abhishek Bose as Rohit Roy Chowdhury from Phulki
- Pallavi Sharma as Alokparna Dutta from Neem Phooler Madhu
- Shweta Bhattacharya as Shaymoli Mallick from Kon Gopone Mon Bheseche
- Ranojoy Bishnu as Aniket Mallick from Kon Gopone Mon Bheseche
- Manali Dey as Shimul Banerjee from Kar Kachhe Koi Moner Kotha
- Basabdatta Chatterjee as Sucharita Basu from Kar Kachhe Koi Moner Kotha
- Aratrika Maity as Raipurna Mukherjee from Mithijhora
- Suman Dey as Anirban Sen from Mithijhora
- Arunima Halder as Titir Banerjee from Mon Dite Chai
- Writtik Mukherjee as Somraj Banerjee from Mon Dite Chai

== Adaptations ==
Language	Title	Original release	Network(s)	Last aired	Notes
Tamil	Yaaradi Nee Mohini யாரடி நீ மோகினி	24 April 2017	Zee Tamil	22 August 2021	Original
Kannada	Yaare Nee Mohini ಯಾರೇ ನೀ ಮೋಹಿನಿ	18 September 2017	Zee Kannada	4 December 2020	Remake
Hindi	Main Bhi Ardhangini में भी अर्धांगिनी	21 January 2019	And TV	1 November 2019	Remake
Hindi	Pyar Ka Pehla Naam: Radha Mohan प्यार का पहला नाम: राधा मोहन	2 May 2022	Zee TV	4 September 2024	Remake
Bengali	Alor Kole আলোর কোলে	27 November 2023	Zee Bangla	22 June 2024	Remake
