= Netaji (TV series) =

Bengali television soap opera about the life of Subhash Chandra Bose

- Promotional Poster
- Genre: Drama biographical
- Created by: Surinder Films
- Written by: Saswati Ghosh; Malova Majumdar; Priyanka Seth
- Directed by: Suman Das Sibangshu Dasgupta Pavel Ghosh Amit Das Gopal Chakraborty
- Creative director: Rai Sengupta
- Starring: Abhishek Bose; Basabdatta Chatterjee; Sriparna Roy
- Voices of: Rupam Islam and chorus
- Theme music composer: Debojyoti Mishra
- Composer: Debojyoti Mishra Upali Chattopadhyay Debjit Roy (Background Music)
- Country of origin: India
- Original language: Bengali
- No. of seasons: 1
- No. of episodes: 416

Production
- Executive producer: Krrishanu Ganguly Aniruddha Ghosh
- Producers: Surinder Singh; Nispal Singh
- Production location: Kolkata
- Cinematography: Paritosh Singh
- Running time: 22 minutes
- Production company: Surinder Films

Original release
- Network: Zee Bangla
- Release: 14 January 2019 – 1 August 2020

Netaji (transl. Respected Leader) is a Bengali biographical soap opera on the life of Netaji Subhash Chandra Bose that premiered on 14 January 2019 and aired on Bengali GEC Zee Bangla. Based majorly on Udyata Kharga Subhash by Achintya Kumar Sengupta and produced by Surinder Films, the series stars Abhishek Bose in the eponymous role, with Basabdatta Chatterjee, marking her comeback on television, Dhruvajyoti Sarkar, Kaushik Chakraborty, Sriparna Roy, Debopriyo Sarkar, Sohan Bandopadhyay, Fahim Mirza appearing in other recurring roles. Due to the COVID-19 pandemic, the shooting of the series was stalled. It was rumoured that along with Karunamoyee Rani Rashmoni, this series will be axed the channel. Putting rest to such rumours, the shooting started from June 11 and new episodes started to air from June 15, 2020. The show went off air on 1 August 2020.

== Plot ==
This show is a biographical drama, depicting the life of Netaji Subhash Chandra Bose. The show begins by presenting the youth of Netaji Subhas Chandra Bose, and presenting the many brave decisions Bose took as a young boy with his friends in Cuttack.

From episode 231, the series transitions to his later life, and his attendance at the Presidency College in Kolkata. In episode 390, there is another jump to 1933.

The show also presents other groups of independence involved at Bose's time, including the likes of Bagha Jatin, Sri Aurobindo, Khudiram Bose and many others associated with the Swadeshi movement. Often regarded as the greatest leader of the Indian Freedom Struggle, he fearlessly led his Indian National Army to war against the British, inspiring mass revolts and mutinies throughout the country, ultimately resulting in India's independence.

== Cast ==
=== Main ===
- Abhishek Bose as Subhas Chandra Bose: Janakinath & Pravabati's son
  - Ankit Mazumder as young Subhas Chandra Bose a.k.a. Subi: Janakinath & Pravabati's son

=== Recurring ===
- Dhrubajyoti Sarkar as Sarat Chandra Bose: Subhash's brother; Janakinath & Prabhabati's son
- Sriparna Roy as Bibhavati Bose (née Dey Biswas) aka Bibha: Sarat's wife; Akshay and Subala's daughter
- Kaushik Chakraborty as Janakinath Bose: Subhash's father
- Basabdatta Chatterjee as Prabhabati Bose (née Dutt) aka Probha
- Saugata Bandyopadhyay as Ashoke Nath Bose
- Diya Mukherjee as Sarbani Roy Choudhury (Bani)
- Gautam Mukherjee as Shankar Lal Roy Chowdhury
- Ritwick Purkait as Kazi Nazrul Islam
- Rob Dey as Sisir Kumar Bose
- Ashmee Ghosh as Ila Bose
- Debopriyo Mukherjee as Mahatma Gandhi
- Anupam Halder as Jawaharlal Nehru
- Debdut Ghosh as Rabindranath Tagore
- Sohan Bandopadhyay as Charles Tegart
- Sharonyo Banerjee as Sgt. Denham
- Sudip Sengupta as Bipin Behari Ganguly
- Nilanjan Datta as Inspector Shiben Chowdhury
- Shyamashis Pahari as Inspector Suresh Sarkhel
- Neil Chatterjee as Pratap Babu
- Lopamurdra Sinha as Pratap's mother
- Moushumi Bhattacharya as Pratap's sister in-law
- Rumpa Das as Pratap's sister
- Fahim Mirza as Rash Behari Bose
- Debomoy Mukherjee as Hemanta Kumar Sarkar
- Siddhartha Shankar Chakraborty as Suresh Chandra Bose
- Jagriti Goswami as Arunprabha Bose
- Aditya Chowdhury as Sunil Chandra Bose
- Indranil Mullick as Rono Dutta
- Pritam Das as Charuchandra Gangopadhyay
- Supratim Sinha as Dilipkumar Roy
- Prriyam Chakraborty as Kalyani Das
- Sahana Sen as Basanti Devi
- Kunal Banerjee as Nanda.
- Kaushik Chakraborty as Janakinath Bose
- Abhijit Debroy as Anupama's father
- Mayna Banerjee as Anupama's mother
- Mridul Majumdar as Abdul
- Debaparna Chakraborty as Anupama Dutta
- Sananda Basak as Pramilabala Mitra
- Ishani Sengupta as Saralabala Dey
- Subhrajit Dutta as Chittaranjan Das
- Arup Poddar as Son of CR Das
- Prantik Banerjee as Ananto Rai
- Priyam as Sudhir Chandra Bose
- Ayush Das as young Sudhir Chandra Bose
- Anirban Guha as Beni Madhab Das
- Arghya Mukherjee as Akshay Kumar Dey Biswas
- Abanti Dutta as Subala Dey Biswas
- Shankar Malakar as Ajit Dey Biswas
- Ranjini Chatterjee as Lalita Sen
- Subhajit Banerjee as Manmotho Sen
- Achintya Kumar Moitro as Mohan Maharaj
- Swarnadipto Ghosh as Bagha Jatin
- Swarnav Banerjee as Chittapriya Ray Chaudhuri
- Debanjan Chatterjee as Swami Vivekananda
- Rahul Sen as Manoranjan Sengupta
- Sanmitra Bhowmik as Jyotishchandra Pal
- Biplab Dasgupta as Debendranath Bose
- Chaitali Mukhopaddhay as Renubala Bose
- Somjita Bhattacharya as Manuda
- Runa Bandopadhyay as Prabhabati's aunt
- Ashok Mukherjee as Prabhabati's uncle
- Jayanta Banerjee as Sonailal Dutta
- Kaushik Banerjee as Kedarnath Bose
- Madhumita Chakrabarty as Madhuri Bose
- Trilok Nath Thander as Nirendranath Dasgupta
- Subrata Guha Roy as Mukunda Ghosh
- Arka Dasgupta as Charles Richardson
- Bharat Kaul as Andrew Henderson Leith Fraser
- Aritra Dutta as Hemchandra Kanungo
- Diganta Saha as Sushil Sen
- Diganta Das as Shyam Sundar Chakravarthy
- Samiul Alam as Khudiram Bose
- Soumendra Bhattacharya as Prafulla Chaki
- Tania Kar as Aparupa Roy
- Lakshya Punjabi as Kirpal Singh
- Madhubani Goswami as Sarala Devi
- Indrajit Mazumder as Prof. E.F. Oaten
- Gopal Talukder as Shubendu Sarkar
- Bhola Tamang as Kalochin
- Siddhartha Ghosh as Birendranath Dutta Gupta
- Shaktipada Dey as DSP Shamsul Alam
- Sayanjit Ghosh Dastidar as Ullaskar Dutta
- Chandan Sen as Dwijendralal Ray
- Manoj Ojha as Sri Aurobindo
- Kanyakumari Mukherjee as Mrinalini Devi: Sri Aurobindo's wife.
- Ishani Das as Sarojini Devi: Sri Aurobindo's sister
- Dwaipayan Das as Barindra Kumar Ghosh
- Animesh Bhaduri as Bhupendranath Datta
- Amitava Bhattacharya as Dr. Joydeb Sanyal
- Sagorika Roy as Joydeb's wife
- Sukanya Basu as Kalpona Dutta
- Biswajit Ghosh as Kanailal Dutta
- Ranjan Shaw as British Police Constable
