= Lawho Gouranger Naam Rey =

2025 Indian Bengali film by Srijit Mukherji

- Teaser poster
- Directed by: Srijit Mukherji
- Written by: Srijit Mukherji
- Produced by: Rana Sarkar; Shrikant Mohta; Mahendra Soni
- Starring: Dibyojyoti Dutta; Aratrika Maity; Subhashree Ganguly; Jisshu Sengupta; Susmita Chatterjee; Bratya Basu; Indraneil Sengupta; Ishaa Saha
- Cinematography: Soumik Haldar
- Edited by: Srijit Mukherji
- Music by: Indraadip Dasgupta; Kabir Suman; Girish Ghosh; Tamalika Golder; Souptik Mazumdar
- Production companies: SVF Entertainment; DAG Creative Media
- Distributed by: PVR Inox Pictures
- Release date: 25 December 2025
- Country: India
- Language: Bengali

Lawho Gouranger Naam Rey (transl. Chant the name of Lord Gouranga), also known by the initials LGNR, is a 2025 Indian Bengali-language epic musical drama film written and directed by Srijit Mukherji. Produced by Shrikant Mohta and Rana Sarkar under the banners of Shree Venkatesh Films and Dag Creative Media respectively, the film is a multi-layered narrative centred on the life of the 15th-century saint Chaitanya Mahaprabhu, the life of the 19th-century theatre icon Nati Binodini, and a modern-day film crew.

The film stars Dibyojyoti Dutta and Aratrika Maity in the lead roles, alongside an ensemble cast of Subhashree Ganguly, Indraneil Sengupta, Ishaa Saha, Bratya Basu, Partha Bhowmick, Debdut Ghosh and Susmita Chatterjee, with Jisshu Sengupta in a special appearance. Srijit Mukherji has also done the editing while the cinematography has been handled by Soumik Haldar. The background score has been composed by Indraadip Dasgupta. Shibashish Bandopadhyay has written the additional dialogues and screenplay. Sabarni Das did the costume design while Somnath Kundu hanled the makeup. The film was theatrically released on 25 December 2025. The film received mostly mixed-to-negative reviews and flopped at the box office.

== Plot ==
The film operates on three distinct timelines, which unfold simultaneously, while often overlapping with each other:

The first timeline is set in the 15th-16th century, focusing on the spiritual journey of Chaitanya Mahaprabhu and the mystery of his disappearance from the Jagannath Temple, Puri. The scenes in this timeline are notably blurred in nature, symbolising the obscurity of his life history. The core of this timeline lies in how Nityananda, Chaitanya's friend and disciple, tries to piece together the puzzle of his vanishing.

The second timeline is set in the 19th century in North Calcutta, featuring Binodini Dasi aka Nati Binodini, alongside her mentor Girish Chandra Ghosh. The scenes in this timeline are notably almost monochromatic in nature. The core of this timeline lies in how Binodini, quietly rebellious in nature, deeply dissolves into the role of Chaitanya on stage while facing societal and professional betrayal. Also depicted is how Ghosh navigates through the compromises he has to make for theatres, and how he becomes a towering figure in the history of Bengali theatre. It also delves into how she sold herself to a wealthy businessman to build a theatre that ultimately erases her contribution, thanks to Ghosh.

The third timeline, which serves as the primary plotline of the film, is set in the 21st century. The scenes in this timeline are shot in crisp focus and full colour. The protagonist of this timeline is Rai, a young award-winning filmmaker director who creates a film dealing with the disappearance of Chaitanya. Parthasarathi is a successful superstar and agrees to play the part of Chaitanya in his lover Rai's "arthouse" film, thereby breaking his mainstream mould. Parthasarathi himself has a trouble domestic life with his estranged wife Nayana which often has a major toll on Parthasarathi's health. As the film progresses, her research on Chaitanya's disappearance begin to affect her: those who probe too deeply into Chaitanya’s disappearance often meet unnatural ends. In the end, she kills herself in a bathtub.

== Cast ==
- Dibyojyoti Dutta as Chaitanya Mahaprabhu / Gouranga
- Aratrika Maity as Laxmipriya, the wife of Chaitanya mahaprabhu
- Subhashree Ganguly as Binodini Dasi / Nati Binodini
- Indraneil Sengupta as Parthasarathi, a successful actor
- Jisshu Sengupta as Nityananda (special appearance)
- Bratya Basu as Girish Chandra Ghosh
- Ishaa Saha as Rai, a young filmmaker
- Partha Bhowmick as Ramakrishna Paramahamsa
- Rupanjana Mitra as Shachidevi, Chaitanya's mother
- Susmita Chatterjee as Nayana, Partha's wife
- Debdut Ghosh in triple roles as
  - Maharaj Pratapaditya
  - Ramakrishna Paramahamsa's associate
  - a cinematographer
- Ananya Banerjee in triple roles as
  - Maharani
  - theatre artist enacting Vishnupriya
  - art director
- Surojit Banerjee in triple roles as
  - a pandit in Neelachal
  - Amrita Lal Basu enacting Sarvabhauma Bhattacharya
  - an associate film director
- Sujan Neel Mukherjee in triple roles as
  - Kashi Pandit
  - Ardhendu Sekhar Mustafi enacting Govinda Vidyadhara
  - the VFX supervisor
- Koushani Mukherjee as Poorna Aich (photo appearance in Partha's film poster during the Bawshontokaal sequence)

== Production ==
=== Announcement and development ===
The film was announced in 2021 but the project suffered a prolonged development hell phase. In 2023, reports surfaced that director Srijit Mukherji had left the film due to date issues, logistical obstacles and creative differences with producer Rana Sarkar, leading to speculation about a change in directorship. In January 2024, there were speculations that Tigmanshu Dhulia will be going to direct the film, after Mukherjee's exit. The producer had also stated that he had completed primary level discussion with Dhulia. However, the project was revived in 2025 with Mukherji back at the helm and a revamped cast. The first poster for the film was released on 14 March 2025, on the occasion of Dol Purnima. The fist look characters of multiple actors from the film were released on 8 June 2025. The muhurat for the film was done on 9 June 2025. The second poster of the film, featuring Subhashree, Indraneil and Dibyajyoti in saffron robe-cladded "Gouranga" avatar was released on 27 June 2025, on the occasion of Rath Yatra.

=== Pre-production ===
Srijit Mukherjee offered Dibyajoti Dutta the role of Chaitanya Mahaprabhu in a phone call in November 2024, but also added that he would require to lose weight. Dutta shared in an interview that from the very next day, he stopped going to the gym, visited a dietitian and started Yoga and Surya Pranam. He did running, sprinting and bodyweight exercises. He ate only once or twice a day and the few days before shoot, he ate only once a day and resorted to drinking watermelon juice if he felt suddenly hungry. He stated that he read a lot of books regarding Mahaprabhu before the shoot, in order to justify his character and also added that he shaved his head for the shoot, rather than resorting to prosthetics. He lost 25 kilograms to suit his role, at the beginning of the shoot. By the end of the shoot, he had lost 27 kilograms. An off-shoot character photograph for Subhashree Ganguly dressed as Binodini Dasi was dropped on the first week of June.

=== Casting ===
"While writing the script, I had Anirban (Bhattacharya) in mind for a character. But my producer wanted Jisshu in the film for the actor’s megaserial, Mahaprabhu, connect. I could understand the nostalgia as the serial had a huge impact on Bengali audiences, but Jisshu was never my first choice."

— Srijit Mukherji, addressing the rumours regarding Jisshu's casting in Lawho Gouranger Naam Rey

The film was announced in 2021 with rumours about Jisshu Sengupta playing the lead role of Chaitanya Mahaprabhu. But Jisshu pulled himself out of the project, since he didn't want to repeat the character which earned him recognition in the early days of his career, in a television series. Post his exit, there were speculations about Anirban Bhattacharya being cast in place of Jisshu. In July 2021, Srijit announced Parambrata Chattopadhyay to replace Sengupta in the role of Chaitanya Mahaprabhu. Parambrata mentioned in an interview that Srijit Mukherjee first offered the role of Chaitanya Mahaprabhu to him, back in 2019. He added that the casting rumours of Jisshu Sengupta arose completely due to Sengupta's iconic rendition of Sri Chaitanya on television, for which the public thought he would be cast. However it turned out that Dibyojyoti Dutta, known for his work in Bengali television serial Anurager Chhowa was cast as the lead. Dutta, who made his feature film debut with this film stated in an interview that portraying Chaitanya Mahaprabhu was one of the most challenging roles of his career, requiring extensive mental and emotional preparation.

Jisshu Sengupta was recast in the film, but this time, to play the role of Nityananda. Priyanka Sarkar was roped in to play the role of Lakshmipriya, Chaitanya Mahaprabhu's first wife. Later, she was replaced by Aratrika Maity. It marked the film debut for Maity. Alokananda Guha was finalised to play the role of Vishnupriya, Chaitanya Mahaprabhu's second wife. Debdoot Ghosh was cast in the role of Maharaj Pratapaditya. Reports stated that he would play different characters in each of the three phases of Chaitanya Mahaprabhu's life that will be portrayed in the film. Parno Mitra was cast in the role of Indraneil's wife.

Anjan Dutt was initially cast to play Ramakrishna Paramahamsa in the film. But in October 2025, theatre actor Partha Bhowmick replaced Dutt as Ramakrishna Paramahamsa. Bhowmick stated that he did not consciously reference Mithun Chakraborty’s National Award–winning portrayal of Ramakrishna in the 1998 film Swami Vivekananda, though he acknowledged Chakraborty as an actor he deeply admires. He also revealed that prior to shooting, he spent extended periods in solitude and meditation as part of his personal preparation for the role. Subhashree Ganguly was cast to play the role of Binodini Dasi and Bratya Basu was brought in to portray Girish Chandra Ghosh. This marked Subhasree's first collaboration with Srijit Mukherjee.

=== Filming ===
Principal photography began from 11 June 2025. The filming was done in Nabadwip, Mayapur, Kolkata, Puri and several parts of Odisha. Ishaa Saha joined the shoot on 13 June 2025. In July 2025, the cast and crew, including Srijit Mukherji, Subhashree Ganguly, and Jisshu Sengupta, were spotted filming in Puri, Odisha, particularly around the Jagannath Temple area. The filming was completed on 16 July 2025, with the last scene being shot at the Jagannath Temple premises in Puri. The final schedule featured Subhashree Ganguly as Binodini Dasi, expressing her devotions to Lord Jagannath.

== Music ==
The soundtrack for Lawho Gouranger Naam Rey has been composed by Kabir Suman, Girish Ghosh, Indraadip Dasgupta, Tamalika Golder and Souptik Mazumdar. The lyrics have been penned by Kabir Suman, Adi Sankaracharya, Girish Ghosh, Tamalika Golder, Souptik Mazumdar and Narottama Dasa Thakura.

The first single "Dyakho Dyakho Kanaiye " was released on 24 November 2025. The second single "Jagannath Swami Nayana Pathagami" was released on 1 December 2025. The third single "Shey Chole Geleo" was released on 6 December 2025. The fourth single "Lukochuri Khela" was released on 12 December 2025. The fifth single "Hari Haraye Namah Krishna" was released on 15 December 2025. The sixth single "Khawne Gorachand Khawne Kaala" was released on 21 December 2025. The entire music album was launched on 23 December 2025, two days before the film's release.

Also, a version from a Sanskrit shloka from the Bhagavata Purana has been sung by Padma Palash, that has been used in the end credits. However, this track was not included in the music album of the film.

== Marketing ==
The official poster was released on 15 March 2025. A teaser was subsequently unveiled on 10 December 2025. As a part of the marketing campaigns, the team of Lawho Gouranger Naam Rey attended an interactive session regarding Sri Chaitanya Mahaprabhu and his connection with Lord Jagannath, at the Chaitanya Research Institute in Kolkata. The trailer for the film was released on 18 December 2025.

== Release ==
Lawho Gouranger Naam Rey was released in the theatres on 25 December 2025, coinciding with Christmas, clashing with Projapati 2 and Mitin: Ekti Khunir Sandhaney.

== Reception ==
=== Critical reception ===
Agnivo Niyogi for The Telegraph reviewed the film and opined "Lawho Gouranger Naam Rey unfolds across three timelines. They do not appear sequentially or through elaborate flashbacks but unfold simultaneously, with the narratives sometimes overlapping through match-cuts." The crisp modern-day narrative, Srijit's storytelling, Ishaa's performance, Subhasree's commanding portrayal of Binodini as well as Chaitanya, Dibyajyoti's performance as Chaitanya and the music were being applauded but the arc where Partha's wife exists in his mind as a memory was being criticized for being an unnecessary disruption to the central story.

Poorna Bnaerjee of The Times of India rated the film 3/5 stars and wrote "Despite its unevenness, Lawho Gouranger Naam Rey is worth watching for its ambition, performances, and its willingness to ask how legends endure after history falls silent—not as fixed truths, but as echoes that continue to shape those who dare to retell them." She praised the film's music, Subhasree's commanding performance as Binodini and Dibyajyoti's portrayal of Chaitanya but bemoaned the fragile contemporary timeline.

Anurupa Chakraborty of The Indian Express rated the film 2.5/5 stars and noted "While trying to unravel the mystery of Sri Chaitanya's disappearance or disappearance, the audience was lost. A little more research was needed in making a movie about such a scholar." She criticized the weak direction, the backstory of the King of Odisha and the below par research done for the film but applauded Dibyajyoti and Subhashree's performance in their respective roles.

== Accolades ==
| Award | Category | Recipient | Result | Ref. |
|---|---|---|---|---|
| Zee 24 Ghanta Binodone Sera 24 | Best Album (Film) | Lawho Gouranger Naam Rey | Won | |
| Zee 24 Ghanta Binodone Sera 24 | Best Playback Singer – Male | Arijit Singh for “Khawne Gorachand Khawne Kaala” | Won | |
