= Pupul =

Pupul may refer to:

== People ==
- Pupul Jayakar (1915–1997), Indian cultural activist and writer
- Pupul Bhuyan, Indian actress, TV presenter, and model
- Bolis Pupul (born 1985), pseudonym of Belgian musician Boris Zeebroek

== Fictional characters ==
- Pupul, from the 2023 Indian television series Alor Kole
