= Atisha Naik =

Indian actress

- Born: Maharashtra
- Occupations: Actress; Director
- Known for: Pudhcha Paaul; Wake up Sid

Atisha Naik is an Indian actress and was 8 years old when she made her debut in a Marathi play, Good Bye Doctor as a child artist. She made her film debut with Mahesh Manjrekar's Hindi film Praan Jaye Par Shaan Na Jaye. Recently, she played an important role of a lady, Sarpanch in the national award-winning film Deool.

She has worked in Marathi serials like Aabhalmaya, Madhu Ithe An Chandra Tithe, Dilya Ghari Tu Sukhi Raha, Ghadlay Bighadlay, Fu Bai Fu (Zee Marathi), Sundara Manamadhe Bharli, Hya Gojirwanya Gharat, Ghadge & Suun (Colors Marathi), Bun Maska (Zee Yuva), Mansicha Chitrakar Toh, Pudhcha Paaul, Swapnanchya Palikadle, Yed Lagla Premacha (Star Pravah), etc.

She has also appeared in Hindi serials like Taarak Mehta Ka Ooltah Chashmah, Ek Packet Umeed etc.

Her Marathi film appearances in Manthan: Ek Amrut Pyala, Bandookya, Salaam and Deool were appreciated by both audience and critics. She has also acted in Hindi feature films like Lafangey Parindey and Wake Up Sid.

== Filmography ==
Year	Title	Role	Language
2003	Praan Jaye Par Shaan Na Jaye	Elachi	Hindi
2003	Nishkalank	Shobha Aunty	Hindi
2004	Wrong Mauritius	Shaila	Marathi
2006	Manthan: Ek Amrut Pyala		Marathi
2007	Ek Daav Sansaracha		Marathi
2009	Wake Up Sid	Mrs. Bapat	Hindi
2010	Lafangey Parindey		Hindi
2011	Zokkomon		Hindi
2011	Deool	Sarpanch Bai	Marathi
2013	We Are On Houn Jau Dya		Marathi
2017	Bandookya	Surangi	Marathi
2018	Hyderabad Custody		Hindi
2021	City Of Dreams	Asiya	Hindi
2022	Gangubai Kathiawadi	Salmabi	Hindi
2023	Taaza Khabar	Alpana Gawde	Hindi

== Television ==
- Bun Maska
- Aabhalmaya
- Hasa Chakat Fu
- Aakrit
- Hya Gojirwanya Gharat
- Puneri Misal
- Pinjara
- Dilya Ghari Tu Sukhi Raha
- Manasicha Chitrakar To
- Fu Bai Fu
- Tharar
- Ghadalay Bighadalay
- Mad Mad Murder
- Kahani Main Twist
- Pardes Main Mila Koi Apanasa
- Crime Patrol
- Ssshhhh...Koi Hai
- Pudhcha Paaul
- Taarak Mehta Ka Ooltah Chashmah
- Ek Packet Umeed
- Ghadge & Suun
- Bigg Boss Marathi (season 1) (as a guest)
- Sundara Manamadhe Bharli
- Swapnanchya Palikadle
- Yed Lagla Premacha

== Natak / Theatre / Play ==
- Ashi Hi Shyamchi Aai
- Shevgyachya Shenga
- Wada Chirebandi - 9 hours play
- Sakkhe Shejari
- Sorry Wrong Number
- Sakharam Binder
- Gidhade
- Suryachi Pille
- Varyavarchi Varat
- Jaubai Jorat
- Vijay Dinanath Chauhan
- Dili Supari Baykochi
