= Shree Krishna Bhakto Meera =

Bengali drama TV series

- Genre: Drama; Mythology; Romance
- Developed by: Shibashish Bandopadhyay (researcher)
- Screenplay by: Writam Ghosal
- Story by: Moumita Kargupta
- Directed by: Rajib kumar
- Creative director: Nairwita Dutta
- Starring: Joey Debroy; Debadrita Basu; Prarabdhi Singha
- Theme music composer: Shabuj-Ashish
- Composer: Upali Chattopadhyay
- Country of origin: India
- Original language: Bengali
- No. of seasons: 1
- No. of episodes: 132

Production
- Executive producers: Reshmi, Lagna & Shaoni (Star Jalsha), Tarpana, Mrinmoyee (Surinder films)
- Producers: Nispal Singh; Surinder Singh
- Production location: Kolkata
- Cinematography: Pintu Shee
- Editors: Ayan Roy & Dibakar Roy
- Camera setup: Multi-camera
- Running time: 22 minutes (approx.)
- Production company: Surinder Films

Original release
- Network: Star Jalsha
- Release: 26 July – 5 December 2021

Shree Krishna Bhakto Meera is a 2021 Indian Bengali mythological drama television series that premiered on 26 July 2021 on Star Jalsha. It was also available on the digital platform Disney+ Hotstar before its release on TV. The series is produced by Nispal Singh and Surinder Singh under the banner of Surinder Films and stars Joey Debroy, Debadrita Basu, Arshiya Mukherjee, Ankit Mazumder and, Prarabdhi Singha in lead roles.

== Airing history ==
The show launched on 26 July 2021 and was given the 9 p.m. timeslot, but was shifted to 11 p.m. due to declining target rating points. The show ended 4 months later, on 5 December.

== Plot ==
The story is a historical drama about Princess Meera, her marriage to Raja Bhojraj, and her devotion to Lord Krishna. Apart from the story of Meera's love and devotion for Lord Krishna, it also shows how her marriage life worked with Raja Bhojraj, and how he protected her until her death.

== Cast ==
=== Main ===
- Debadrita Basu as Princess Meera Bai : Veer Kumari and Ratan Singh's daughter, an ardent devotee of Lord Krishna and Rajkumar Bhoj's love interest turned wife (later widow).
- Arshiya Mukherjee as Young Meera
- Joey Debroy as Bhoj Raj : Maharana Sangram Singh's eldest son, Rani Dhona Bai's biological son, Rajkumari Meera's husband. (Deceased)
- Ankit Mazumder as Young Bhojraj.
- Prarabdhi Singha as Lord Krishna

=== Recurring ===
Meera's family

- Atri Bhattacharya as Prince Jaimal : Meera's elder cousin brother.
- Tamagno Manna as Young Jaimal
- Poonam Basak as Mrinal Kumari : Meera's elder cousin sister-in-law, Jaimal's wife.
- Rayati Bhattacharya as Veer Kumari / Chhoto Bourani : Ratan Singh's wife, Meera's mother. (Deceased)
- Sutirtha Saha as Ratan Singh : Meera's father, Veer Kumari's husband.
- Somjita Bhattacharya as Kokila : Mejo Bourani's assistant.
- Kuyasha Biswas as Princess Madhuraa : Meera's elder cousin sister, Mejo Bourani and Viram Singh's daughter.
- Tanishka Tiwari as Young Madhuraa
- Riyanka Dasgupta as Gourja aka Mejo Bourani : Madhuraa and Jaimal's mother, and Viram Singh's wife.
- Subhajit Banerjee as Viram Singh : Mejo Bourani's husband, Meera's elder paternal uncle.
- Hridlekha Banerjee as Boro Bourani : Meera's eldest paternal aunt, Raimal Singh's wife.
- Subhrajit Dutta as Raimal Singh : Meera's eldest paternal uncle, Boro Bourani's husband.
- Sumanta Mukherjee as Maharaja Rao Dudaji : Champak Bai's husband, Meera, Madhuraa and Jaimal's grandfather.
- Kheyali Ghosh Dastidar as Maharani Champak Bai : Rao Dudaji's wife, Meera, Madhuraa and Jaimal's grandmother.

Bhoj's family

- Sudip Sarkar as Prince Vikram : Rani Karma Bai's eldest biological son.
- Sarbik Pal as Young Vikram
- Sujata Dawn as Rani Karma Bai : Maharana Sangram Singh's second wife.
- Chaitali Chakraborty as Mukta: Rani Karma Bai's Assistant
- Avery Singha Roy as Rani Dhona Bai : Bhoj and Darpona's biological mother, Maharana Sangram Singh's first wife, Vikram, Udaa Bai and Uday's step-mother.
- Arijit Chowdhury as Maharana Sangram Singh : Bhoj, Vikram, Udaa, Uday and Darpona's father.
- Ishani Sengupta as Princess Udaa Bai : Bhoj's younger half-sister and Vikram's younger biological sister.
- Debmalya Gupta as Prince Uday Pratap Singh : Maharana Sangram Singh and Rani Karma Bai's youngest biological son.
- Adwitiya Basu Roy as Princess Darpona : Maharana Sangram Singh's biological daughter.

Others

- Debdut Ghosh as Ravidas.
- Bhaswar Chatterjee as Raj Purohit Bhairabnath
- Pratyush Kumar Bandyopadhyay as Narayan
- Rupam Singha as Suraj Mahal : Vikram, Udaa and Uday's maternal uncle
- Pritha Roy as Malini : Meera's close friend.
- Rajiv Banerjee as Raj Purohit of Meera's family

== Production ==
=== Release ===
The show released on 26 July 2021.

== Reception ==
The TV soap has been placed on an average rating on Bengali television in its first week.
