= Ei Ami Renu =

2021 Indian Bengali drama film

- Directed by: Saumen Sur
- Based on: The novel 'Ei Ami Renu' by Samaresh Majumdar.
- Starring: Sohini Sarkar; Gaurav Chakrabarty; Soham Chakrabarty
- Music by: Rana Mazumder
- Production company: Aangsh Movies
- Release date: 9 April 2021
- Country: India
- Language: Bengali

Ei Ami Renu is an Indian Bengali drama film which is directed by Saumen Sur. It stars Sohini Sarkar, Gaurav Chakrabarty, Soham Chakraborty, Koushik Ganguly, Anindya Chatterjee, and Alivia Sarkar. The film is produced by Aangsh Movies.The music & lyrics for the film were composed by Rana Mazumder. The film was released on 9 April 2021.

== Cast ==
- Sohini Sarkar as Renu
- Gaurav Chakrabarty as Sumit
- Soham Chakraborty as Baren
- Koushik Ganguly as BBC, Sneaky Detective
- Anindya Chatterjee as Ashok
- Alivia Sarkar as Jhuma

== Soundtrack ==
All Lyrics Rana Mazumder & Music Rana Mazumder.

Track listing
No.	Title	Lyrics	Music	Singer	Length
1.	"Chup Kore Tui"	Rana Mazumder	Rana Mazumder	Monali Thakur, Ash King	3:26
2.	"Besh Toh"	Rana Mazumder	Rana Mazumder	Shreya Ghoshal	2:54
3.	"Chol Choley Jaai"	Rana Mazumder	Rana Mazumder	Shreya Ghoshal, Arijit Singh	3:57
4.	"Renu Title Track"	Rana Mazumder	Rana Mazumder	Kailash Kher	3:12
