= Alo Chhaya =

Bengali Drama

- Genre: Drama; Romantic; Family
- Created by: Debalay Bhattacharya; Sushanta Das
- Written by: Kallol Lahiri; Pritikana Paul Roy
- Directed by: Pijyushkanti Ghosh; Subrata Sharma; Saminul Ojha
- Creative directors: Susanta Das; Nikhil Orao
- Starring: Debadrita Basu; Oindrila Bose; Arnab Banerjee
- Opening theme: "Alo Chhaya"
- Composer: Indraadip Das Gupta
- Country of origin: India
- Original language: Bengali
- No. of episodes: 486

Production
- Producer: Susanta Das
- Production location: Kolkata
- Cinematography: Santu Dutta
- Running time: 22 minutes
- Production company: Tent Cinema

Original release
- Network: Zee Bangla
- Release: 2 September 2019 – 9 April 2021

Alo Chhaya is an Indian Bengali television soap opera which premiered on 2 September 2019 as a replacement of the popular daily soap Joyee and aired on Bengali General Entertainment Channel Zee Bangla and all old episodes are also available on the digital platform ZEE5. The series was produced by Susanta Das under the banner of Tent Cinema. It starred Debadrita Basu, Oindrila Bose, and Arnab Banerjee in lead role. The show went off air on 9 April 2021 due to low TRP ratings.

The story revolves around the life of an orphan girl named Alo, whose life gets intertwined with her maternal cousin Chhaya, since childhood. When Alo and Chhaya gets married into the same family, a new set of problems arise between the two.

== Cast ==
=== Main ===
- Debadrita Basu as Alo Chatterjee Sengupta – Gayatri and Pabitra's daughter; Deepu and Chhaya's cousin; Akash's wife
  - Hiya Dey as Child Alo Chatterjee
- Oindrila Bose as Chhaya Adhikari Banerjee – Maitreyee and Alokendu's daughter; Deepu and Alo's cousin; Baban's widow; Deepjoy's wife
  - Smriti Singh as Child Chhaya Adhikari
- Arnab Banerjee as Akash Sengupta – Alokananda and Tirthankar's youngest son; Amit, Niloy, Pali and Linaa's brother; Baban's cousin; Alo's husband

=== Recurring ===
- Kaushik Das as Pratik "Baban" Sengupta – Jaya's son; Amit, Niloy, Pali, Akash and Linaa's cousin; Chhaya's first husband (Dead) (Main Antagonist)
- Souvik Banerjee as Deepjoy Banerjee – Shashikala Devi's son; Deepanwita's brother; Chhaya's second husband
- Bidipta Chakraborty as Maitreyee Adhikari – Gayatri's sister; Alokendu's wife; Chhaya's mother
- Kushal Chakraborty as Alokendu Adhikari – Kundalata's son; Maitreyee's husband; Chhaya's father
- Anamika Saha as Kundalata Adhikari – Alokendu's mother; Chhaya's grandmother
- Surojit Banerjee as Birendra Adhikari
- Kanyakumari Mukherjee / Tanushree Goswami as Gayatri Chatterjee – Maitreyee's sister; Pabitra's wife; Alo's mother
- Kaushik Bhattacharya as Pabitra Chatterjee – Gayatri's husband; Alo's father
- Dolon Roy as Alokananda Sengupta – Tirthankar's wife; Amit, Niloy, Pali, Akash and Linaa's mother
- Arindam Banerjee as Tirthankar Sengupta – Pritilata's son; Rupa's brother; Alokananda's husband; Amit, Niloy, Pali, Akash and Linaa's father (Antagonist)
- Abanti Dutta as Agnirupa "Rupa" Sengupta – Pritilata's daughter; Tirthankar's sister
- Debika Mitra as Pritilata Sengupta – Tirthankar and Rupa's mother; Amit, Niloy, Pali, Akash, Linaa and Baban's grandmother
- Shraboni Bonik as Jaya Sengupta – Baban's mother
- Vivaan Ghosh as Amit Sengupta – Alokananda and Tirthankar's eldest son; Niloy, Pali, Akash and Linaa's brother; Baban's cousin; Deepanwita's husband
- Ipshita Mukherjee as Deepanwita Banerjee Sengupta – Shashikala Devi's daughter; Deepjoy's sister; Amit's wife
- Saugata Bandyopadhyay as Niloy Sengupta – Alokananda and Tirthankar's second son; Amit, Pali, Akash and Linaa's brother; Baban's cousin; Ruchira's husband
- Deepshita Mitra / Alokananda Guha as Ruchira Sengupta – Niloy's wife
- Elfina Mukherjee as Amropali "Pali" Sengupta Samaddar – Alokananda and Tirthankar's elder daughter; Amit, Niloy, Akash and Linaa's sister; Baban's cousin; Sujoy's estranged wife
- Ranit Modak as Sujoy Samaddar aka Aniket Mitra – Pali's estranged husband; Baban's former friend
- Nandini Dutta as Elinaa "Linaa" Sengupta – Alokananda and Tirthankar's younger daughter; Amit, Niloy, Pali and Akash's sister; Baban's cousin
- Soma Banerjee as Shashikala Devi Banerjee – Deepjoy and Deepanwita's mother
- Sourya Bhattacharya as Deepu Adhikari – Alo and Chhaya's cousin
  - Samriddho as Child Deepu Adhikari
- Aritra Dutta as Anish – Anushree's lover
- Satabdi Nag as Anushree – Manjushree's daughter; Tanushree's sister; Anish's lover
- Sayantani Sengupta as Tanushree – Manjushree's daughter; Anushree's sister
- Sudeshna Roy as Manjushree – Tanushree and Anushree's mother
- Sonalisa Das as Bipasha Sanyal – Akaash's ex-fiancée
- Diganta Bagchi as Sudhin
