= Gangaram (TV series) =

Indian Bengali television series

- Genre: Drama; Romance; Comedy
- Created by: Blues Productions
- Developed by: Blues Productions
- Screenplay by: Snehasish Chakraborty
- Story by: Snehashish Chakraborty
- Directed by: Akash Sen Rajat Paul
- Starring: Abhishek Bose; Sohini Guha Roy
- Voices of: Joy Bhattacharya
- Composer: Snehasish Chakraborty
- Country of origin: India
- Original language: Bengali
- No. of seasons: 1
- No. of episodes: 402

Production
- Executive producers: Runa, Sudip & Shuvo (Blues Productions); Samajita, Saptara & Shruti (Star Jalsha)
- Producer: Snehashish Chakraborty
- Cinematography: Amitabha Chakraborty
- Editor: Bapon Pramanik
- Running time: 22 minutes
- Production company: Blues Productions

Original release
- Network: Star Jalsha
- Release: 28 December 2020 – 15 July 2022

Gangaram is an Indian Bengali-language romantic comedy drama television series which premiered on 28 December 2020 on Bengali Entertainment Channel Star Jalsha. It is also available on the digital platform Disney+ Hotstar. The show is produced by Snehashish Chakraborty under the banner of Blues Productions. It stars Abhishek Bose and Sohini Guha Roy in lead roles. This show replaced one of the longest running Bengali Daily Soap Ke Apon Ke Por from 28 December 2020.

== Plot ==
The story involves Gangaram Roy, a charming simpleton guy from a village whose life revolves around music. He is the son of Band Master Nepal Roy, who runs a famous musical band named "Surjhankar." Gangaram possesses extraordinary musical skills. He finds music in everything and dreams big about becoming a successful singer.

Once he steps into the city of Kolkata to perform in the marriage ceremony of a rich girl named Tayra Chatterjee. She is a spoiled brat who lives in world of fantasies and considers life as cinema. She loves a Tollywood superstar named Samar Kumar, a.k.a. Sammy and prepares herself to get married with him.

However things get turned around on the day of marriage when Gangaram gets accidentally married to Tayra in a major twist of events. Tayra accepts on the proposal to live with Gangaram for thirty days.

At the beginning, Tayra doesn't like Gangaram because he is illiterate and poor, but their relationship takes a major turn when Renee Sen, the daughter of famous musician Jhontu Sen, meets Gangaram.

Renee becomes the mentor of Gangaram and gets a herculean task to groom Gangaram to help him achieving his musical ambitions. With time passes, Renee starts falling in love with Gangaram. The growing intimacy between Renee and Gangaram disturbs Tayra and she begins to realise that she starts falling in love with Gangaram.

Thirty days passes away and Tayra is still in dilemma about her relationship with Gangaram. Later she finally acknowledges her love for Gangaram and decides to live with him. While Renee gets devastated on hearing the truth of Gangaram's marriage.

Gangaram and Tayra get separated again due to misunderstandings arise between them. Tayra gets upset and leaves Gangaram. She gives thirty days deadline to Gangaram to prove his worth. Gangaram vows not to confront Tayra until he becomes successful in the field of music.

Gangaram qualifies for the main event of a singing reality show. To patch up with Tayra again, Sammy hatches conspiracy to disqualify Gangaram at the later rounds.

Gangaram wins the singing competition. Even after Gangaram rises to fame, the egoist and arrogant Tayra is unwilling to accept him. She keeps on insulting Gangaram's singing and challenges him to become superstar like Sammy. Gangaram assures Tayra that one day he will surprass Sammy's popularity and she will bow down to his fame of success.

After being disheartened by Tayra's behaviour, Gangaram decides to shift Mumbai to establish himself as a singing superstar. He bids adieu to Tayra and says he wants to pave his own way to success with hard work. He doesn't need Sammy's support to become successful in field of music. Thus he turns down Sammy's offer to sing for his upcoming movies.

Gangaram begins his musical journey in Mumbai. Meanwhile, he befriends a struggling junior artist named Munna. Gangaram also meets Jeena who is a popular actress. To settle old scores with Sammy, Jeena decides to provide Gangaram a big break in music industry.

Sammy gets frustrated on Gangaram's initial success. He thinks he will lose Tayra if Gangaram gets immense popularity. So he tries to harass Gangaram in every possible way with help of his illegal sources. Meanwhile, after hearing that Jeena is helping Gangaram to fulfill his musical ambitions, Tayra gets emotional and feels insecure about losing Gangaram.

Sammy goes berserk and attempt to shoot Gangaram with help of his henchmen Kapoor. After knowing that Jeena sacrifices her life to save Gangaram, Tayra realises that Jeena and Gangaram might be in love with each other. She gets upset and decides to break her marriage with Gangaram.

Backed by Jeena's immense support, Gangaram rises to fame in music. Tayra decides to marry Sammy as she thinks Gangaram is in love with Jeena. Gangaram lost consciousness after Rawal Seth attempts to kill him. Meanwhile, Tayra arrives to Mumbai to console the injured Gangaram.

== Cast ==
=== Main ===
- Abhishek Bose as Gangaram Roy, A charming simpleton guy from a village who dreams big about becoming a successful singer; Tayra's husband
- Sohini Guha Roy as Tayra Roy (née Chatterjee), A girl who compares life with cinema and dreams big about her marriage with a superstar; Gangaram's wife

=== Recurring ===
- Samrat Mukherji as Samar Kumar a.k.a. Sammy (Main Antagonist)
- Surabhi Mallick as Renee Sen
- Priyanka Rati Pal as Priyanka
- Kushal Chakraborty as Nepal Roy, Gangaram's Father
- Mousumi Saha as Biraj Roy, Gangaram's Mother
- Srabanti Malakar as Sandhya Roy, Gangaram's Aunt
- Sagarika Roy as Gangaram's Aunt
- Raja Chatterjee as Hubba, Gangaram's Uncle
- Brinda Mukherjee as Bulti, Gangaram's Cousin
- Jayanta Das as Shiringi
- Basanti Chatterjee as Tayra's Grandmother
- Supriyo Dutta as Shibnath Chatterjee, Tayra's Father
- Subhadra Mukherjee as Sunita Chatterjee, Tayra's Mother
- Rupsha Chakraborty as Sakshi Chatterjee, Tayra's Sister-in-Law
- Mahua Haldar as Mohona Chatterjee, Tayra's Sister-in-Law
- Mishty Das as Pico, Tayra's Sister
- Sujan Neel Mukherjee as Bablu, Tayra's Elder Brother
- Dipanjan Bhattacharya as Tublu, Tayra's Brother
- Sougata Dasgupta as Lattu, Tayra's Younger Brother
- Joy Badlani
- Arun Saha as Chandranath, Shibnath's Assistant
- Susmita Chanda as Susmita, Sammy's Assistant
- Palash Adhikari as Munna
- Ayeashrya Chatterjee as Jeena

== Reception ==
=== Ratings ===
| Week | Year | BARC Viewership | | Ref. |
| Week | Year | TRP | Rank | Ref. |
|---|---|---|---|---|
| Week 16 | 2021 | 4.0 | 4 | |
| Week 17 | 2021 | 3.9 | 5 | |
| Week 18 | 2021 | 3.3 | 5 | |
| Week 19 | 2021 | 3.9 | 5 | |
| Week 22 | 2021 | 3.5 | 4 | |
