= Punyi Pukur =

Indian television series

- Genre: Drama; Romance
- Created by: Magic Moments Motion Pictures
- Written by: Leena Gangopadhyay
- Directed by: Saibal Banerjee; Snehashish Jana
- Starring: Monami Ghosh; Koushik Roy; Aparajita Adhya
- Voices of: Madhuraa Bhattacharya
- Opening theme: "Punyi Pukur"
- Composer: Debojyoti Mishra
- Country of origin: India
- Original language: Bengali
- No. of episodes: 491

Production
- Producers: Leena Gangopadhyay; Saibal Banerjee
- Production location: Kolkata
- Camera setup: Multi-camera
- Production company: Magic Moments Motion Pictures

Original release
- Network: Star Jalsha
- Release: 7 December 2015 – 28 May 2017

Related
- Jol Nupur; Bhojo Gobindo

Punyi Pukur is a Bengali television soap opera that premiered on 7 December 2015 on Star Jalsha at 9:30 PM IST and streams digitally on JioHotstar. Produced by Magic Moments Motion Pictures, it stars Monami Ghosh and Koushik Roy in lead roles and Aparajita Adhya, Bharat Kaul, Anushree Das and Debaparna Chakraborty in prominent roles. It replaced Jol Nupur. Alongside Guddi, this is a very regressive serial produced by Magic Moments Motion Pictures as its plotline centers around polygamy, abuse of women and excessive negativity.

== Plot ==
Punyi Pukur follows the story of Kankon at her in-laws' house and how her relationship with her in-laws take turns with time. It is a story of Kankon, who lives in a village and since she was not getting married, Kankon and her mother, Hoimonti always had to listen her uncle's taunts. Kankon's father is tracking lover and gets missing from her birth. Kankon's aunt Basumati and her sister Chhuti is always in favor of Kankon. Kankon is very much interested in idol making from a localite, Biswanath, who has a past. Later, Kankon marries into a wealthy house in Kolkata.

Kankon's husband Somudro is a professor at a college and with time falls in love with Kankon. Kankon too loves him, but both, due to their ego and pride do not confess to each other. Meanwhile, Somudro doubts Kankon's childhood acquaintance, Riju to be Kankon's lover. It is revealed that Kankon's marriage was fixed to Riju but it never happened. Kankon does not love Riju, but Somudro keeps on doubting her. And, in order to make Kankon feel jealous, he tells her that his friend Sayoni and he are in love with each other. Kankon is very much hurt but does not give in, thinking that she is a village girl and unworthy of him.

To make Kankon even more jealous, he brings Sayoni home and asks Sayoni to act as his lover and act as if they would be marrying each other. Sayoni is revealed to be in love with Somudro since a long time. But Somudro has never considered Sayoni anything more than a friend. On the day of Somudro's birthday, in front of everyone, Sayoni attempts to put a ring on Somudro's finger. But Somudro immediately pulls his hand away and in front of everybody grabs Kankon's hand and confesses his love for her.

== Cast ==
=== Main ===
- Monami Ghosh as Kankaboti “Kankon” Banerjee (née Mukherjee) – Chandra Shekhar and Hoimonti's daughter; Somuddro's wife
- Koushik Roy as
  - Prof. Somuddroneel “Somuddro / Pupul” Banerjee a.k.a. Chand Baba – Debjit and Shrestha's son; Radha's stepson / adoptive son; Saaji's younger brother; Sayani's close friend & former love interest; Kankon's husband
  - Ronnie Golmes – Twin brother of Somuddro who was lost after birth

=== Recurring ===
Banerjee family / Somuddro's family

- Aparajita Adhya as Radharani “Radha” Banerjee – Debjit's first wife; Shrestha's elder sister; Somuddro's stepmother / adoptive mother. She stayed back in the Banerjee residence as she didn't accept the signature on the divorce paper with Debjit. (Deceased)
- Bharat Kaul as Barrister Debjit Banerjee a.k.a. Barojjemoshai – Somuddro's father; Radha and Shrestha's husband
- Anushree Das as Barrister Shrestha Banerjee a.k.a. Chutki – Debjit's second wife; Radha's younger sister; Somuddro’s mother
- Ambarish Bhattacharya as Chandrajit "Chandu" Banerjee a.k.a. Kutty – Debjit's younger brother; Koyel’s husband; Jiya’s father; Somuddro's uncle
- Rajanya Mitra as Koyel Banerjee – Chandrajit's wife; Jiya’s mother; Somuddro’s aunt
- Sohini Sanyal as Sahana Ganguly – Debjit's younger sister; Atri's mother; Somuddro's aunt
- Bulbuli Choubey Panja as Surovi Banerjee a.k.a. Saaji – Debjit and Shrestha's daughter; Radha's stepdaughter / adoptive daughter; Atri & Jiya's elder cousin; Sourav's wife; Somuddro's elder sister
- Sudip Sarkar as Sourav – Saaji's husband; Somuddro's brother-in-law
- Anish Mukherjee as Atri Ganguly – Sahana's son; Aratrika's husband; Somuddro, Saaji's younger & Jiya's elder cousin
- Nabanita Malakar as Aratrika “Mimi” Banerjee – Atri's wife; Somuddro's sister-in-law
- Ayesha Bhattacharya as Joyeeta “Jiya” Banerjee - Chandrajit and Koyel's daughter; Somuddro, Saaji & Atri's younger cousin; briefly Sourav's unwilling wife & obsessive lover

Mukherjee family / Kankon's family

- Chandan Sen as Chandra Shekhar Mukherjee – Hoimonti's estranged husband for a long period; Kankon's father
- Soma Banerjee as Hoimonti Mukherjee – Chandra Shekhar's wife; Kankon's mother
- Sandeep De as Shyam Shankar Mukherjee – Chandra Shekhar's younger brother; Basumati's husband; Chhuti's father; Kankon's uncle
- Rita Dutta Chakraborty as Basumati Mukherjee – Shyam Shankar's wife; Chhuti's mother; Kankon's aunt
- Aishwarya Sen as Debasree “Chhuti” Majumder (née Mukherjee) – Shyam Shankar and Basumati's daughter; Sarbajit's wife; Kankon's younger cousin
- Sourav Das as Sarbajit Majumdar – Chhuti's husband; Kankon's brother-in-law

=== Others ===
- Santu Mukherjee as Bishwanath “Bishu” Pal – Radha's elder brother-figure; a sculptor
- Gautam De as Gautam Majumdar – Sarbajit's uncle
- Sreela Majumdar as Saswati Majumdar – Sarbajit's aunt
- Rahul Chakraborty as Dr. Dasgupta – Radha's sworn younger brother; Radha & Kankon's well wisher
- Debaparna Chakraborty as Sayani Ghosh – Somuddro’s friend & obsessive lover who wants to marry him; Kankon's rival
- Shankar Chakraborty as Aratrika's father
- Sutapa Banerjee as Aratrika's mother
- Suchandra Chowdhury as Sourav's mother
- Ashok Mukherjee as Sourav's uncle
- Arup Roy
