= Alivia Sarkar =

Indian Bengali Actress

- Born: 20 May 1993 (age 33); Durgapur, West Bengal
- Occupations: Model; Actress
- Known for: Malini Sen in Joyee
- Notable work: Seemarekha (2017); Joyee (2017)

Alivia Sarkar (Bengali: অলিভিয়া সরকার) (born 20 May 1993) is an Indian model and Bengali actress who works primarily in TV soap operas. She is well known for portraying the female antagonist in the daily soaps Joyee and Seemarekha.

== Television ==
- All soap operas are in Bengali language, unless otherwise mentioned.

Year	Title	Role	Channel	Ref.
2014-2015	Thik Jeno Love Story	Pooja	Star Jalsha	
2013-2016	Bojhena Se Bojhena	Gouri Singh	Star Jalsha	
2015-2016	Goyenda Ginni	Pola (special character)	Zee Bangla	
2015	Mon Niye Kachakachi	Jyoti Kapoor	Star Jalsha	
2015-2017	Milon Tithi	Doyel Mullick	Star Jalsha	
2016-2017	Jhanjh Lobongo Phool	Manali	Star Jalsha	
2016-2017	Bhootu	Tania/ Raagi Aunty		
2017	Bhakter Bhogobaan Shri Krishna	Holika	Star Jalsha	
2017	Premer Kahini	Shreya	Star Jalsha	
2017-2019	Joyee	Malini Sen	Zee Bangla	
2017-2019	Seemarekha	Tiya	Zee Bangla	
2019	Jai Kali Kalkattawali	Linda	Zee Bangla	
2019-2020	Guriya Jekhane Guddu Sekhane	Abira's elder sister	Zee Bangla	
2023	Ranga Bou	Malobika	Zee Bangla	
2023-2025	Phulki	Sheena Lohia	Zee Bangla	
2025–2026	Milon Hobe Koto Dine	Meghna Sen	Star Jalsha	

== Filmography ==
- Ragging (2012)
- Hoichoi Unlimited (2018)
- Lady Chatterjee (2022)
- Abar Aranyer Din Ratri (2022)
- Horror Stories (2022)
- Shades of Life (2022)
- Ei Ami Renu (2021)
- Ki Kore Toke Bolbo (2016)
- Rappa Roy & Full Stop Dot Com (2025)

== Web series ==
- Break Up Story (2020)
- Montu Pilot (2019-2022)
- Murder by the Sea (2022)
