= Seemarekha =

Bengali television family drama

- Genre: Drama; Romance
- Created by: Surinder Films
- Story by: Saswati Ghosh; Dialogue; Poushali Ghosh Dastidar
- Directed by: Suman Das
- Starring: Diya Mukherjee; Abhishek Bose; Indrani Haldar; Badsha Maitra
- Composer: Joy Sarkar
- Country of origin: India
- Original language: Bengali
- No. of seasons: 1
- No. of episodes: 377

Production
- Producers: Surinder Singh; Nispal Singh
- Production location: Kolkata
- Running time: 21 minutes
- Production company: Surinder Films

Original release
- Network: Zee Bangla
- Release: 23 October 2017 – 12 January 2019

Related
- Aamar Durga; Vani Rani

Seemarekha is a Bengali television family drama. It premiered on 23 October 2017 and aired on Zee Bangla. The show is produced by Surinder Films and stars Indrani Haldar in titular double role, Diya Mukherjee and Abhishek Bose in parallel lead roles and Sudip Sarkar as an antagonist.

== Cast ==
=== Lead ===
- Indrani Haldar in dual role:
  - Simantini Guha Roy a.k.a. Seema: Rekha's twin elder sister; Sitangshu's wife; Pratik, Pala, Pakhi's mother. (Main Antagonist)
  - Ruprekha Guha Roy aka Rekha: Seema's half an hour twin younger sister; Subhrangshu's wife.
- Diya Mukherjee as Bindi Mitra- Jeet's Wife, Seema and Rekha's Sister-in-law
- Abhishek Bose as Priyojeet Mitra aka Jeet, Bindi's Husband.

=== Recurring ===
- Badshah Moitra as Subhrangshu Guha Roy: Ruprekha's second husband; Seetangshu's youngest brother; Aparna's younger son.
- Debdut Ghosh as Sitangshu Guha Roy: Simantini's husband; Subhrangshu's elder brother; Aparna's elder son; Pratik, Pala, Pakhi's father.
- Ananya Chattopadhyay as Aparna Guha Roy: Rekha and Seema's mother-in-law; Sitangshu and Subhrangshu's mother; Proyojeet and Piyali's paternal aunt.
- Sudip Sarkar as Rick
- Ashmita Chakraborty as Piyali
- Soumi Ghosh as Pola
- Alivia Sarkar as Tiya
- Prantik Banerjee as Karna
- Priyanka Bhattacharjee as Tilottoma
- Dipanjan Bhattacharya as Tushar
- Rumpa Chatterjee as Kamini
- Dolon Roy as Ranjana
- Biplab Banerjee as Jeet's father
- Ritoja Majumder as Jeet's mother
- Kaushambi Chakraborty as Ahona
- Kaushiki Guha as Rick's mother
- Shankar Debnath as Ratan
- Rajib Basu as Pratik
