= Khelna Bari =

Indian Bengali television series (2022–2023)

- Genre: Drama; Romance; Thriller
- Created by: Samrat Ghosh
- Screenplay by: Malova Majumder
- Story by: Souvik Chakraborty
- Directed by: Snehasish Jana
- Creative director: Srijit Ray
- Starring: See below
- Composer: Suvam Moitra
- Country of origin: India
- Original language: Bengali
- No. of episodes: 519

Production
- Executive producers: Krishanu Ganguly; Srijita Chakraborty (Zee Bangla)
- Producer: Zee Bangla
- Production locations: Kolkata, West Bengal
- Cinematography: Bishwajit Mitra
- Editors: Jishu Nath; Biplab Mandal; Sumonto
- Camera setup: Multi-camera
- Running time: 22 minutes
- Production company: Zee Bangla Productions

Original release
- Network: Zee Bangla
- Release: 16 May 2022 – 23 November 2023

Khelna Bari is a 2022 Indian Bengali-language romantic thriller drama television series that aired on Zee Bangla. The show premiered on 16 May 2022 and concluded its final episode on 23 November 2023. It was produced by Zee Bangla and starred Aratrika Maity and Biswajit Ghosh.

== Cast ==
=== Main ===
- Aratrika Maity as Mitul Paul Lahiri: Indrajit's wife, Googly's adopted mother, and Shiva's mother.
- Biswajit Ghosh as Indrajeet Lahiri aka Indra: Mitul's husband, Antara's ex-husband, Googly and Shiva's father.
- Indrani Bhattacharya as Sohag Chowdhury (née Lahiri) aka Googly: Indra and Antara's daughter, Mitul's adoptive daughter, Shiva's stepsister, Dr. Sanchayan's wife.
  - Mahi Singh as Young Sohag Lahiri aka Googly
- Sabuj Bardhan as Dr. Sanchayan Chowdhury: Googly's husband, Subrata and Monorama's son.
- Saptarshi Basu Roy Chowdhury as Ador Lahiri aka Shiva: Indra and Mitul's son, Googly's stepbrother.

=== Recurring ===
- Samir Biswas as Late Devkumar Lahiri: Indra's grandfather.
- Anuradha Roy as Kanika Lahiri: Devkumar's wife, Sushovon and Sumi's mother, Indra, Rono, Shubho and Koli's grandmother.
- Sohan Bandyopadhay as Sushovon Lahiri: Indra and Rano's father.
- Nandini Chatterjee as Debjani Lahiri: Indra's stepmother, Rono and Shubho's mother.
- Mayna Banerjee as Susmita Chakraborty (née Lahiri) aka Sumi: Sushovon's sister, Koli's mother, Indra, Rono and Shubho's aunt.
- Sayantan Sarkar as Late Ronojit Lahiri aka Rono: Sushovon and Debjani's son, Indra's stepbrother, Shubho's brother, Anamika's husband, Simi's ex-husband.
- Ashmita Chakraborty as Dr. Kothakoli Basu (née Chakraborty) aka Koli: Sumi's daughter, Indra, Rono and Shubho's cousin sister, Arka's wife.
- Neil Chatterjee as Arkaprava Basu aka Arka: Koli's husband, Indra's friend & business partner.
- Rishav Chakraborty as Shubhajit Lahiri aka Shubho: Sushovon and Debjani's son, Indra's stepbrother, Rono's brother, Aloka's husband.
- Piyali Sasmal as Alokananda Lahiri (née Mitra) aka Aloka: Shubho's wife.
- Srijita Dona Chakraborty as Dona: Shubho's student and fake fiance.
- Surojit Banerjee as Dr. Pulak Chakraborty: Sumi's husband, Koli's father.
- Anindya Chakrabarti as Palash: Debjani's brother, Swarnali's husband, Srishti's father, Rono and Shubho's uncle.
- Lopamudra Sinha as Swarnali: Palash's wife, Srishti's mother, Rono and Shubho's aunt.
- Bristi Roy as Srishti: Palash and Swarnali's daughter, Rono and Shubho's cousin sister.
- Mishmee Das
  - Anamika Lahiri: Antara's twin sister, Rono's second wife.
  - Late Antara Lahiri: Googly's biological mother, Indra's first wife.
- Ayendri Lavnia Roy as Anuradha Apte: Indra's obsessive lover.
- Swagata Sen as Simantini Lahiri aka Simi: Rono's ex-wife.
- Amitava Das as Anirban: Koli's fiance.
- Riya Ganguly Chakraborty as Mohini Roy: Googly's fake mother.
- Abhijeet Debroy as Swapan Roy: Googly's fake father.
- Tanushree Goswami as Sudeshna: Sohini's lawyer.
- Joy Badlani as Raghunath Apte: Anuradha's father.
- Suparna Patra as Sohini: Indra's office worker.
- Gulshanara Khatun as Rajani: Shiva's adopted mother.
- Sanjay Basu as Dr. Shubhobrata: Indra's Kidnapper.
- Rupam Singha as Santu Yadav: Bihar jail criminal.
- Shubhosree Chakraborty as Rajashree: Mitul and Googly's University teacher.
- Suddhosatva Majumdar as Bittu Lahiri: Ronojit and Anamika's son.
- Rayati Bhattacharya as Monorama Chowdhury: Sanchayan's mother.
- Animesh Bhaduri as Subrata Chowdhury: Sanchayan's father.
- Ankusree Maity as Monjusha Chowdhury aka Monju: Sanchayan's elder sister, Subrata and Monorama's daughter.
- Oliva Bhattacharya as Chandrani Chowdhury: Sanchayan's aunt, Supratip's wife.
- Siddhartha Ghosh as Supratip Chowdhury: Sanchayan's uncle, Chandrani's husband, Arjya's biological father.
- Raima Sengupta as Sreetoma Chowdhury aka Sree: Sanchayan's cousin sister, Supratip and Chandrani's daughter.
- Sourav Das as Sutirtha Chowdhury aka Tirtha: Sanchayan's younger brother, Subrata and Monorama's youngest son.
- Pranabhi Bose as Sutanuka

== Reception ==
TRP ratings for 2022
Week	BARC viewership		Ref.
Week	TRP	Rank	Ref.
Week 20	4.5	10	
Week 22	5.5	9	
Week 23	5.5	9	
Week 24	5.5	8	
Week 25	5.7	10	
Week 26	5.7	10	
Week 27	5.3	9	
Week 28	5.6	10	
Week 29	5.6	10	
Week 30	5.1	10	
Week 31	5.2	8	
Week 33	5.5	10	
Week 34	5.9	10	
Week 35	5.9	8	
Week 36	5.9	9	
Week 37	6.1	7	
Week 38	6.2	8	
Week 39	6.0	9	
Week 40	6.1	5	
Week 42	6.2	10	
Week 45	6.7	5	
Week 46	6.8	6	
Week 47	7.1	4	
Week 48	8.2	2	
Week 49	7.7	5	
Week 50	8.3	2	
Week 51	8.0	4	
Week 52	7.9	4	

TRP ratings for 2023
Week	BARC viewership		Ref.
Week	TRP	Rank	Ref.
Week 1	8.1	3	
Week 2	7.8	4	
Week 3	6.9	6	
Week 4	7.5	5	
Week 5	7.8	4	
Week 6	8.3	4	
Week 7	8.4	4	
Week 8	5.7	4	
Week 9	7.9	4	
Week 10	7.5	3	
Week 11	7.3	3	
Week 12	7.5	5	
Week 13	6.7	3	
Week 14	6.0	8	
Week 15	5.7	8	
Week 16	5.5	8	
Week 20	4.4	9	
Week 27	5.3	10	
Week 28	5.4	10	
Week 29	5.5	10	
Week 30	6.0	9	
Week 31	5.7	9	
Week 32	6.0	7	
Week 33	6.3	9	
Week 35	5.8	10	
Week 36	6.4	7	
Week 37	6.5	8	
Week 38	6.5	7	
