= Sundara Manamadhe Bharli =

2020 Indian Marathi language TV series

- Genre: Drama; Romance
- Written by: Madhugandha Kulkarni
- Directed by: Girish Mohite
- Starring: See below
- Opening theme: "Sundara Manamadhe Bharli" by Maithili Panse Joshi and Avdhoot Gupte
- Country of origin: India
- Original language: Marathi
- No. of episodes: 981

Production
- Producer: Manava Naik
- Running time: 22 minutes
- Production company: Strawberry Pictures

Original release
- Network: Colors Marathi
- Release: 31 August 2020 – 14 August 2023

Sundara Manamadhe Bharli (transl. Beauty filled mind) is an Indian Marathi-language television series which aired on Colors Marathi. It premiered from 31 August 2020 and ended on 14 August 2023 completing 981 episodes. It starred Akshaya Naik and Sameer Paranjape in lead roles. It is produced by Manava Naik under the banner of Strawberry Pictures.

== Plot ==
Latika is a very warm-hearted and intelligent girl filled with optimism. A perfect daughter, sister and a friend. Even though her life looks ideal, she faced several rejections for marriage alliances due to her obesity. Whereas her late husband Abhimanyu was a fitness enthusiast who wanted everyone to be healthy.

== Cast ==
=== Main ===
- Akshaya Naik as Latika "Lati" Dhumal Karkhanis – Eknath and Jayshree's younger daughter; Surekha's sister; Abhimanyu's childhood friend and widow; Devrat's wife; Adhira's mother; Vikya, Sajjan and Nandini's friend; Kamini, Sarjerao and Daulatrao's arch rival
- Sameer Paranjape as Abhimanyu "Abhya" Jahagirdar – Uttamrao and Indumati's younger son; Ashutosh's brother; Latika's first husband; Adhira's father; Latika and Surekha's childhood friend; Devrat, Vikya, Sajjan and Nandini's friend; Kamini, Sarjerao and Daulatrao's arch rival
- Kunal Dhumal as Devrat "Deva" Karkhanis – Vidya's son; Latika's second husband; Adhira's step-father; Abhimanyu, Vikya, Sajjan and Nandini's friend; Kamini, Sarjerao and Daulatrao's arch rival

=== Recurring ===
- Adhira Aundhkar as Adhira Jahagirdar – Latika and Abhimanyu's daughter; Devrat's step-daughter
- Prakash Dhotre as Uttamrao "Appa" Jahagirdar – Indumati's husband; Ashutosh and Abhimanyu's father; Adhira's grandfather
- Atisha Naik as Indumati Jahagirdar – Uttamrao's wife; Ashutosh and Abhimanyu's mother; Adhira's grandmother
- Pranav Prabhakar as Ashutosh Jahagirdar – Uttamrao and Indumati's elder son; Abhimanyu's brother; Hemlata's husband
- Pramiti Narke / Sharvari Pendharkar as Hemlata Jahagirdar – Ashutosh's wife
- Gauri Kiran as Surekha Dhumal – Eknath and Jayashree's elder daughter; Latika's sister; Abhimanyu's childhood friend
- Umesh Damle as Eknath "Bapu" Dhumal – Mrs. Dhumal's son; Jayashree's husband; Surekha and Latika's father; Adhira's grandfather
- Poonam Chaudhari-Patil as Jayashree Dhumal – Eknath's wife; Surekha and Latika's mother; Adhira's grandmother
- Unknown as Mrs. Dhumal – Eknath's mother; Surekha and Latika's grandmother; Adhira's great-grandmother

=== Others ===
- Chaitanya Bagul as Vikya – Latika, Abhimanyu, Devrat, Sajjan and Nandini's friend
- Sandesh Uppasham as Sajjan – Latika, Abhimanyu, Devrat, Vikya and Nandini's friend
- Aditi Dravid as Nandini – Latika, Abhimanyu, Devrat, Vikya and Sajjan's friend
- Pooja Purandare as Kamini (Miss Nashik) – Latika, Abhimanyu and Devrat's arch rival
- Hrishikesh Shelar as Daulat Nimbalkar – Latika, Abhimanyu and Devrat's arch rival
- Kalpesh Patil as Kalpya
- Mukund More as Mukya
- Nikhil Rahane as Ravi
- Radha Sagar as Abhilasha
- Sanjay Kulkarni as MK
- Chitra Kulkarni as Sajjan's mother
- Dhananjay Wable / Umesh Bolake as Daulat's father
- Swanandi Tikekar as Pratiksha

== Production ==
=== Casting ===
Akshaya Naik and Sameer Paranjape were selected for the roles of Latika and Abhimanyu, respectively. Later, Kunaal Dhumal replaced Sameer Paranjape as a new lead of the show. Atisha Naik is selected for the role of Indumati.

== Adaptations ==
Language	Title	Original release	Network(s)	Last aired	Notes
Marathi	Sundara Manamadhe Bharli सुंदरा मनामध्ये भरली	31 August 2020	Colors Marathi	14 August 2023	Original
Gujarati	Maru Man Mohi Gayu મારૂં મન મોહી ગયું	27 September 2021	Colors Gujarati	30 September 2024	Remake
Bengali	Sohag Chand সোহাগ চাঁদ	28 November 2022	Colors Bangla	7 November 2024	Remake
Hindi	Meri Bhavya Life मेरी भव्य लाइफ	30 April 2025	Colors TV	1 August 2025	Remake
