= 36 Ghanta =

- Genre: Thriller, Crime
- Written by: Jon Halder
- Directed by: Jon Halder
- Starring: Koushik Roy; Debashree Roy
- Music by: Rajdeep Ganguly
- Country of origin: India
- Original language: Bengali
- No. of seasons: 1
- No. of episodes: 5

Production
- Cinematography: Anir
- Editor: Koustav Sarkar

Original release
- Network: Klikk
- Release: 31 January 2024

36 Ghanta (Thirty Six Hours) is a 2024 Indian Bengali language crime and thriller web series written and directed by Jon Halder.

== Synopsis ==
Massive financial borrowing to finance the company, which was followed by a stock market meltdown. Nihar's financial problems arrived at his door over night. After being betrayed, Nihar faces financial disaster and is targeted by loan sharks. While seeking assistance, he finds money at the scene of an accident, which sparks a political controversy. Reborrowing money is the solution to the issue. Creditor demands began to rise in this direction. Nihar was searching for money when he suddenly found himself holding a bag of cash. His life changes when he embezzles money since he can't control his greed.

== Cast ==
- Koushik Roy as Nihar Chatterjee
- Debashree Roy
- Plaban Basu as Nirjhar Nandi
- Riya Ganguly as Ankita
- Somnath Chakraborty

== Episodes ==
No.	Title	Directed by	Original release date
1	"Money"	Jon Halder	31 January 2024
Nihar Chatterjee, a businessman, is in severe financial need. He must protect his family from debt collectors.
2	"Politics"	Jon Halder	31 January 2024
While Nihar is the focus of a search operation by the state police. He flees to the bush, where he discovers an abandoned bungalow.
3	"Family"	Jon Halder	31 January 2024
Under political pressure, police keep looking for Nihar since he is believed to be a murderer.
4	"Greed"	Jon Halder	31 January 2024
While police steadily closing in on Nihar as he rambles around the jungle looking for a way out, politicians are plotting the bloodiest possible attack on him.
5	"The Fall"	Jon Halder	31 January 2024
The decisive battle. Who is it, Nihar, the authorities, or the politicians? Who is the beneficiary of the funds?
