= Aalta Phoring =

2022 Indian television series

- Genre: Drama; Family; Romance
- Created by: Sushanta Das
- Written by: Dialogues: Ayan Chakraborty; Ananya Roy
- Screenplay by: Moloy Bandopadhyay
- Story by: Sushanta Das; Sayantani Bhattacharjee
- Directed by: Pijush Ghosh
- Starring: Kheyali Mondal; Abhishek Bose; Saoli Chattopadhyay; Arnab Banerjee
- Music by: Shibashish Bandopadhyay
- Opening theme: "Aalta Phoring"
- Country of origin: India
- Original language: Bengali
- No. of episodes: 425

Production
- Executive producers: Sheema Ghosh; Reshmi Roy; Shuvojit Singha; (Star Jalsha)
- Producer: Susanta Das
- Production location: Kolkata
- Cinematography: Surajit Dutta
- Editors: Amitabh Bagchi; Proshanto Maity
- Camera setup: Multi-camera
- Running time: 22 minutes
- Production company: Tent Cinema

Original release
- Network: Star Jalsha
- Release: 10 January 2022 – 12 March 2023

Aalta Phoring was an Indian Bengali drama television series on Star Jalsha which premiered on 10 January 2022. It was produced by Susanta Das under the banner of Tent Cinema. It starred Kheyali Mondal, Arnab Banerjee and Saoli Chattopadhyay. From October 2022, the show starred Abhishek Bose as a new lead.

== Plot ==
The show evolves around the struggles of Phoring, a gymnast girl facing many problems in her life. Firstly, Phoring is separated from her mother due to a flood in their village and she almost drowns into the water. Avro, a bank officer saved her and brought her into his house without permission of family members. He tries to hide Phoring but soon Phoring is exposed. Avro's mother wanted to marry off Avro with Poushali but Avro falls in love with Phoring and they get married.

== Cast ==
=== Main ===
- Kheyali Mondal as
  - Aalta Phoring Naskar Chatterjee – An aspiring gymnastician; Radharani and Nirmal's elder daughter; Johnny's twin sister; Babiya's half-sister; Abhra's ex-wife; Arjun's wife (2022–2023)
  - Johnny Naskar – Radharani and Nirmal's younger daughter; Phoring's estranged twin sister; Babiya's half-sister (2023)
- Abhishek Bose as Arjun Chatterjee – A boxer; Deepankar's son; Swarup, Somu, Abhra and Sagar's cousin; Phoring's rescuer and second husband. (2022–2023)
- Saoli Chattopadhyay as Radharani Naskar – Ex-gymnastician; Nirmal's ex-lover and rival; Phoring and Johnny's mother. (2022–2023)
- Arnab Banerjee as Abhradeep "Abhra" Chatterjee aka Bank Babu – A bank employee; Sankar and Suchitra's younger son; Somu's brother; Swarup, Arjun and Sagar's cousin; Phoring's rescuer and first husband later rival; Neha's husband. (2022–2023) (Dead)

=== Recurring ===
- Ayendri Lavnia Roy as Poushali "Maamuni" Mitra – Abhra's love interest; Phoring's rival (2022)
- Ashmita Baidya as Neha Chatterjee – Abhra's widow (2022–2023)
- Amitabh Bhattacharjee as Nirmal Banerjee – Radha's rival and ex-lover; Pupu's husband; Babiya, Phoring and Johnny's father (2022–2023)
- Poushmita Goswami as Pushpita "Pupu" Banerjee – Nirmal's wife; Babiya's mother; Phoring and Radha's rival (2022–2023)
- Moupiya Goswami as Babiya Banerjee – Nirmal and Pupu's daughter; Phoring and Johnny's half-sister; Sagar's love interest (2022–2023)
- Arun Banerjee as Deepankar Chatterjee – Patrairch of Chatterjees'; Sankar, Kinkar and Chinmoy's brother; Arjun's father (2022–2023)
- Raunak Dey Bhowmick as Sagar Chatterjee – Chinmoy's son; Somu, Swarup, Abhra and Arjun's cousin; Babiya's love interest (2022–2023)
- Tulika Basu as Suchitra Chatterjee – Sankar's wife; Somu and Abhra's mother (2022–2023)
- Surojit Banerjee as Sankar Chatterjee – Deepankar, Kinkar and Chinmoy's brother; Suchitra's husband; Somu and Abhra's father (2022–2023)
- Sudip Sarkar as Soumitra "Somu" Chatterjee – Sankar and Suchitra's elder son; Abhra's brother; Swarup, Arjun and Sagar's cousin; Amrita's husband (2022)
- Misty Singh as Amrita Chatterjee – Somu's wife (2022–2023)
- Chandraneev Mukherjee as Swarup Chatterjee – Kinkar's son; Somu, Abhra, Arjun and Sagar's cousin; Mandira's husband (2022)
- Nandini Saha as Mandira Chatterjee – Swarup's wife (2022–2023)
- Koushik Bhattacharya as Chinmoy Chatterjee – Deepankar, Sankar and Kinkar's brother; Sagar's father (2022–2023)
- Bonhi Chakraborty as Chinmoy's wife; Sagar's mother (2022–2023)
- Arindol Bagchi as Kinkar Chatterjee – Deepankar, Sankar and Chinmoy's brother; Swarup's father (2022–2023)
- Rumpa Chatterjee as Kinkar's wife; Swarup's mother (202)
- Sanjukta Roy Chowdhury as Abhra's aunt (2022)
- Gargi Kundu as Dolon – Care taker of Chatterjees (2022)
- Rimjhim Mitra as Amrapali Chowdhury – Abhra's new boss and one sided lover (2022)
- Ranjini Chatterjee as Poushali's mother (2022)
- Subrata Mitra as Poushali's father (2022)
- Mouli Dutta as Arjun's sister (2022)
- Chumki Chowdhury as Arjun's mother (2022)
- Raja Goswami as Animesh (2023)
- Nandini Dutta as Rini; Arjun's one sided lover (Antagonist) (2023)

== Reception ==
=== TRP Ratings ===
Week	Year	BARC Viewership		Ref.
Week	Year	TRP	Rank	Ref.
Week 2	2022	9.2	3	
Week 3	2022	9.2	3	
Week 4	2022	9.8	1	
Week 5	2022	9.5	4	
Week 6	2022	9.1	4	
Week 7	2022	9.3	3	
Week 8	2022	9.5	2	
Week 9	2022	9.1	3	
Week 10	2022	9.0	4	
Week 11	2022	8.7	3	
Week 12	2022	9.1	3	
Week 13	2022	8.5	3	
Week 14	2022	7.5	5	
Week 15	2022	7.2	3	
Week 16	2022	7.7	4	
Week 17	2022	6.8	5	
Week 18	2022	6.7	5	
Week 19	2022	7.7	4	
Week 20	2022	7.5	4	
Week 21	2022	7.4	5	
