= Koushik Roy =

Bengali television actor

Kaushik Roy
- Born: Baharampur, West Bengal, India
- Occupation: Actor
- Known for: Samudraneel Banerjee in Punyi Pukur
- Notable work: Bojhena Se Bojhena (2015); Punyi Pukur(2015); Khorkuto (2020); Alor Kole (2023)
- Political party: Bharatiya Janata Party
- Spouse: Portia Roy
- Children: 1

Kaushik Roy is an Indian television and film actor. Roy is best known for playing the lead antagonist, Krishnendu Sengupta, in Bojhena Se Bojhena and main protagonist in Khorkuto. He has also played the lead role in Onnyo Bwosonto and a supporting role in Ekla Cholo.

== Filmography ==
Year	Films	Role	Director	ref
2013	Proloy			
2013	Goynar Baksho			
2014	Teen Patti			
2015	The Third Eye			Short film
2015	Onnyo Bwosonto			
2015	Ekla Cholo			
2018	Maati			
2018	Bhagshesh			
2018	WMT 9615			
2021	Flyover			
2022	Dharmajuddha		Raj Chakraborty	

== Television ==
Year	Show	Role	Production company(s)	Notes
2011–2012	Josh	Shabba	Raj Chakraborty Productions	
2012–2014	Bodhu Kon Alo Laaglo Chokhe	Sougata Moitra	Shree Venkatesh Films	
2013–2015	Bojhena Se Bojhena	Krishnendu Sengupta	Shree Venkatesh Films	Main Antagonist
2013–2015	Ishti Kutum	Bikramjit Mukherjee aka Bikram a.k.a. Bikram	Magic Moments Motion Pictures	
2015	Dadagiri Unlimited	As a participant (To promote Ekla Chalo)	Subhankar Chattopadhyay Productions	
2015–2017	Punyi Pukur	Prof. Somuddroneel Banerjee a.k.a. Somuddro aka Pupul / Ronnie	Magic Moments Motion Pictures	Lead role
2018	Kusum Dola	Lawyer Shramanjit Ganguly	Magic Moments Motion Pictures	Supporting role
2018–2019	Phagun Bou	Anurup Mallick a.k.a. Roop	Magic Moments Motion Pictures	Main Antagonist
2020–2022	Khorkuto	Soujanyo Mukherjee a.k.a. Babin & Dr. Sourin Mukherjee a.k.a. Ishaan, Babin's son	Magic Moments Motion Pictures	Lead role
2023	Balijhor	Maharghya	Magic Moments Motion Pictures	Lead Role
2023–2024	Alor Kole	Aditya Sen a.k.a. Adi	Nideas Creation	Lead Role
2025–present	Milon hobe koto dine	Mainak		Supporting role

== Web series ==
Year	Title	Role	Language	Production	Ref.
2019	Taranath Tantrik	Tantrik	Bengali	Hoichoi	
2022	Bodhon	Riju Ganguly	Bengali	Hoichoi	
2024	36 Ghanta	Nihar Chatterjee	Bengali	Klikk	
2025	Bishohori	Abhirup Mitra	Bengali	Hoichoi	

== Awards ==
Year	Award	Category	Name	Result
2015	Tele Samman Award	Best Actor (negative role)	As Krishnendu Sengupta in Bojhena Se Bojhena	Won
2019	Tele Academy Awards	Best Negative Role	Phagun Bou	Won
2022	West Bengal Tele Academy Awards	Best Pair (Male)	As Babin in Khorkuto	Won
