= Sohag Chand =

2023 Indian television series

- Genre: Drama
- Screenplay by: Camelia Banerjee; Tapan Ganguly
- Story by: Ashranu Mitra
- Directed by: Subhendu Chakraborty, Victo, Monojit
- Creative director: Subhendu Chakraborty
- Starring: Anwesha Mukhopadhyay; Abhishek Veer Sharma
- Theme music composer: Jeet Ganguly
- Opening theme: "Sohag Chand bodoni dhoni nacho to dekhi"
- Country of origin: India
- Original language: Bengali
- No. of episodes: 711

Production
- Producers: Surinder Singh; Nispal Singh
- Camera setup: Multi-camera
- Production company: Surinder Films

Original release
- Network: Colors Bangla
- Release: 28 November 2022 – 7 November 2024

Related
- Sundara Manamadhe Bharli

Sohag Chand is a 2022 Indian Bengali drama television series that released from 28 November 2022 on Colors Bangla. The series is produced under the banner of Surinder Films. It stars Anwesha Mukhopadhyay and Abhishek Veer Sharma in lead roles. It is an official remake of Marathi TV series Sundara Manamadhe Bharli.

== Cast ==
=== Main ===
- Anwesha Mukhopadhyay as Sohag Banerjee (née Mitra)
- Abhishek Veer Sharma as Chandrashekhar Banerjee aka Chand

=== Recurring ===
- Rohit Mukherjee as Uttam Kumar Banerjee
- Tanuka Chatterjee as Indubala Banerjee aka Indu
- Poushmita Goswami as Piyali Banerjee aka Piya
- Shraboni Banik as Gangajyoti Mitra aka Ganga
- Mridul Majumdar as Tapan Mitra
- Satabdi Nag as Sucheta
- Soumi Banerjee as Kamalika Banerjee
- Debottam Majumder as Suryashekhar Banerjee aka Surya
- Ayendri Lavnia Roy as Mallika
- Suvajit Kar / Debopriyo Mukherjee as Durjoy Mondal
- Bharat Kaul as Duryadhan Mondal
- Shovan Kamila as Ratan
- Anuradha Mukherjee as Khoyai Basu
- Neil Chatterjee asArno
- Samata Das
- Madhurima Basak
- Bhavana Banerjee
- Sutirtha Saha
