= Ayendri Lavnia Roy =

Indian television actress

- Occupation: Actress
- Known for: Titli, as Rehana; Aalta Phoring, as Poushali; Khelna Bari, as Anuradha Apte; Sohag Chand, as Mallika

Ayendri Lavnia Roy is an Indian television actress who is mostly seen in negative roles. She has worked in projects such as Titli, Gramer Rani Binapani, Aalta Phoring, Khelna Bari, Mithai and Phulki.

== Career ==
Roy initially started with modelling and was working in commercials. She started her acting career with Adorini and also worked in Ami Sirajer Begum and Ekhane Aakash Neel and since Titli she started getting popular in the industry and has been playing negative roles.

== Television ==
Year	Show	Channel	Role	Notes	Production company
2017-2018	Adorini	Star Jalsha	Puchki	Supporting Role	Blues Production
2018-2019	Ami Sirajer Begum	Star Jalsha	Shehzadi Afseen Begum	Supporting Role	Shree Venkatesh Films
2019-2020	Ekhane Aakash Neel	Star Jalsha	Dr.Sunayna	Supporting Role	Surinder Films
2020-2021	Titli	Star Jalsha	Rehana Mitra	Antagonist	Tent Cinema
2021-2022	Gramer Rani Binapani	Star Jalsha	Olivia	Antagonist	Boyhood Productions
2022-2023	Aalta Phoring	Star Jalsha	Poushali Mitra	Antagonist	Tent Cinema
2022-2023	Khelna Bari	Zee Bangla	Anuradha Apte	Antagonist	Zee Bangla in-house Productions
2023	Mithai	Zee Bangla	Rohini Basu	Antagonist	Zee Bangla in-house Productions
2023-2025	Phulki	Zee Bangla	Ishita Paul	Antagonist	Zee Bangla in-house Productions
2024	Akash Kusum	Sun Bangla	Jhum Mukerjee Deb Barman	Antagonist	Acropoliis Entertainment
2024	Sohag Chand	Colors Bangla	Mallika	Antagonist	Surinder Films
2024-2025	Neem Phooler Madhu	Zee Bangla	Mohini	Antagonist	Zee Bangla in-house Productions
2025	Geeta LL.B	Star Jalsha	Adhora Sinha	Antagonist	Blues Productions
2025	Mithijhora	Zee Bangla	Dr. Oindrila Chakraborty	Supporting Role	Organic Productions
2025	Kon Gopone Mon Bheseche	Zee Bangla	Upasana Sanyal	Antagonist	Zee Bangla in-house Productions
2026	Tui Amar Hero	Zee Bangla	Manjuri (Later replaced by Satabdi Nag)	Antagonist	Teamwork Productions
2026	Kusum	Zee Bangla	Megha Banerjee	Antagonist	Acropoliis Entertainment
2026	Lokkhi Jhnapi	Star Jalsha	Tuurna	Main Antagonist	
