= Rappa Roy & Full Stop Dot Com =

2025 Indian action thriller film

- Directed by: Dhiman Barman
- Screenplay by: Dhiman Barman; Arnit Chetry; Aritra Sengupta; Ayan Bhattacharjee
- Dialogues by: Dhiman Barman; Arnit Chetry
- Based on: Rappa Roy by Sujog Bandyopadhyay
- Produced by: Dhiman Barman
- Starring: Alivia Sarkar; Shantilal Mukherjee; Rajatava Dutta; Saurav Das; Sabyasachi Chowdhury; Rahul Banerjee
- Cinematography: Anujit Kundu
- Edited by: Sujay Dutta Ray
- Music by: Samidh Mukerjee
- Production company: DB Productions
- Release date: 5 December 2025
- Running time: 155 minutes
- Country: India
- Language: Bengali

Rappa Roy & Full Stop Dot Com is an Indian Bengali-language action comedy film directed and produced by Dhiman Barman. The film is based on the Rappa Roy Bengali comics series created by Sujog Bandyopadhyay.

The film was released on 5 December 2025 under the banner of Dhiman Barman Productions.

== Plot ==
Rappa, a young aspiring journalist working for the Kolkata-based newspaper Dainik Jayadhvaja, becomes entangled in a conflict with the Full Stop.com crime syndicate. While investigating a series of crimes, he uncovers a dangerous mafia network operating in the city. Rappa's father disapproves of his activities, whereas his uncle, the Inspector general of police, consistently encourages and supports him. As the investigation progresses, Rappa finds that actress Dolphin Ganguly has been kidnapped by the gang. Determined to rescue her, Rappa teams up with his filmmaker friend Tony and embarks on a risky mission to bring her back.

== Cast ==
- Arpan Ghoshal as Rappa Roy
- Alivia Sarkar as Dolphin Ganguly
- Bratya Basu
- Shantilal Mukherjee as Rappa's father
- Rajatava Dutta
- Sourav Das
- Sujan Mukherjee
- Rahul Banerjee
- Sabyasachi Chowdhury as Chili
- Debashis Roy as Tony
- Debasish Mondal as Momo
