= Mili (TV series) =

2023 Indian television series

- Genre: Drama; Romance; Thriller
- Screenplay by: Priyanka Seth
- Story by: Anshuman Pratyush
- Directed by: Pijush Ghosh
- Creative director: Anshuman Pratyush
- Starring: Kheyali Mondal; Anubhav Kanjilal
- Opening theme: "Ek tukro bhalobashar naam Mili"
- Composer: Pratik Kundu
- Country of origin: India
- Original language: Bengali
- No. of seasons: 1
- No. of episodes: 148

Production
- Executive producers: Avi Roy (Screen Players); Sromona Ghosh; Shreya Guha; Suchandra Basu (Zee Bangla)
- Producer: Kanak Bhattacharya
- Cinematography: Gourango Mitra
- Editor: Krishnendu Datta
- Camera setup: Multi-camera
- Production company: Screen Players

Original release
- Network: Zee Bangla
- Release: 25 September 2023 – 5 April 2024

Mili is a 2023 Indian Bengali Romantic Thriller Drama television series that released on 25 September 2023 on Zee Bangla. The series is produced under the banner of Screen Players. It stars Kheyali Mondal and Anubhav Kanjilal in lead roles.

== Cast ==
=== Main ===
- Kheyali Mondal as Mili Sanyal (née Sinha)- A IPS officer, Arjun's wife, Rahul's former love interest. (Female Lead)
- Anubhav Kanjilal as Arjun Sanyal aka Robinhood - A criminal, Pushpendu and Neelima's son, Chandra's brother, Mili's husband. (Male Lead)
  - Ankit Majumdar as Young Arjun Sanyal

=== Recurring ===
- Dhrubajyoti Sarkar as Rahul Roy Barman (Former Antagonist) : Social media influencer, Mili's lover, Arjun's enemy, Papri's husband
- Sandip Chakraborty as Koushik Roy Barman: Rahul's father, Rupsha's husband
- Swarnakamal Dutta as Rupsha Roy Barman: Rahul's mother, Koushik's wife
- Saptarshi Ray as Kamalesh Roy Barman (Antagonist): Rahul's uncle, Anuj and Rinku's father
- Swagata Basu as Sucheta Roy Barman: Rahul's aunt, Anuj and Rinku's mother
- Sayanta Modak as Anuj Roy Barman : Rahul's elder brother, Chandra's husband
- Mayna Banerjee as Neelima Sanyal (née Bhaduri) aka Nelu : Chandra and Arjun's mother.
- Sreetama Baidya as Titli Rani : Arjun's friend, Mili's rival
- Oindrila Bose as Papri Roy Barman (née Bhaduri) (Former Antagonist) : Arjun's younger cousin sister, Kishore and Aparna's daughter, Rahul's wife, Mili's college rival.
- Prriyam Chakraborty as Chandra Roy Barman (née Sanyal) : A mentally retarted girl, Arjun's elder sister, Anuj's wife
- Biplab Banerjee as Nabin Bhaduri: Neelima's eldest brother
- Manoj Ojha as Kishore Bhaduri: Arjun's maternel uncle, Papri's father, Aparana's husband, Neelima's elder brother
- Sahana Sen as Aparna Bhaduri: Arjun's maternal aunt, Papri's mother, Kishore's wife
- Mafin Chakraborty as Rekha Bhaduri: Arjun's maternal aunt
- Arnab Banerjee as Prabin Bhaduri: Arjun's maternal uncle, Neelima's youngest brother
- Suchandra Chowdhury as Chandra, Arjun and Papri's grandmother
- Buddhadeb Bhattacharjee as Abinash Sinha: Mili's father, A police officer.
- Soma Banerjee as Sabitri aka Boya: Mili's aunt
- Ishani Sengupta as Ridhima aka Rinku (née Roy Barman) - Rahul's cousin sister, Kamalesh's daughter, Anuj's elder sister, Arjun's namesake sister and well-wisher.
- Sayan Banerjee as Anirban: Rinku's husband, A lawyer.
- Kaushiki Guha as Anirban's mother, Rinku's mother-in-law
- Rhine Ghosh as Priyanka Bhaduri aka Priya : Arjun's cousin sister

=== Guest appearance ===
- Arunima Halder as Titir Basu from Mon Dite Chai
