= Vishnupriya =

Daughter of Indian Raj

Vishnupriya Debi
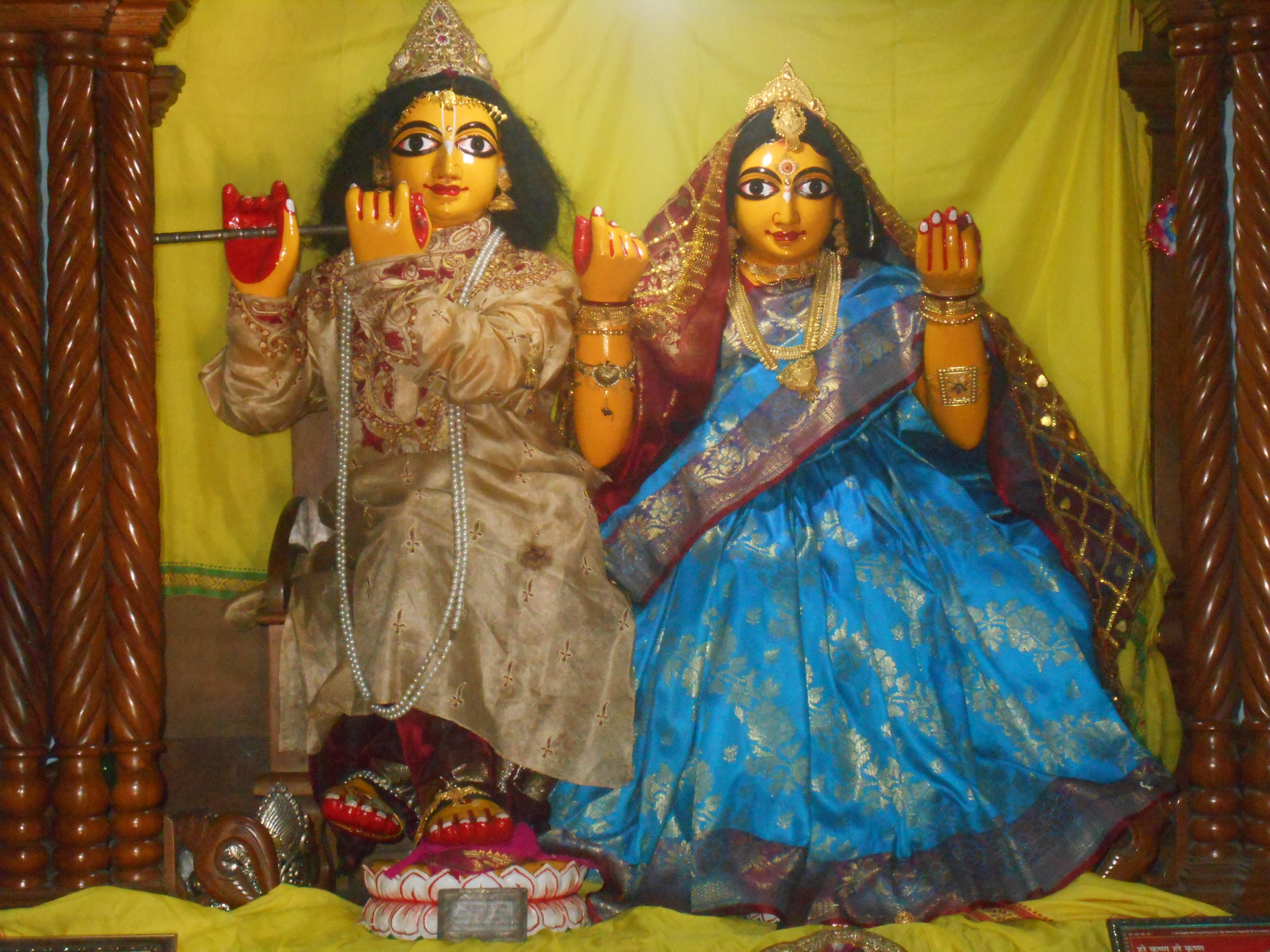
- Idol of Chaitanya Mahaprabhu and Vishnupriya Devi, Nabadwip

Personal life
- Born: Vishnupriya; Basant Panchami, 16th Century Malancha Para, Nabadwip, Nadia district, (Now in West Bengal)
- Died: Falguni Purnima Nabadwip
- Spouse: Chaitanya Mahaprabhu
- Relatives: Sanatan Mishra (Father), Mahamaya devi (Mother)

Religious life
- Religion: Hinduism

Vishnupriya Devi (Bengali: বিষ্ণুপ্রিয়া) a.k.a. Bishnupriya Debi Biṣṇupriẏā Dēbī, was the daughter of Sanatan Mishra, and the second wife of Chaitanya Mahaprabhu. According to Gaudiya Vaishnavism, she is believed to be reincarnation of the goddess Satyabhama, the third queen consort of Krishna in Dvaraka.

== Life ==
Vishnupriya was born to Sanatan Mishra of Nabadwip. After the death of Lakshmipriya from the effects of a snakebite Chaitanya Mahaprabhu's mother Saci Devi asked him to marry Vishnupriya.

== Chaitanya Mahaprabhu's Sanyas ==
In 1509, at the age of 24, Chaitanya Mahaprabhu became a Sanyasi, left home and also Vishnupriya.

== Her hidden greatness ==
She is the direct manifestation of 'Bhu' form Mahalaxmi (Satyabhama) to help Gauranga Mahaprabhu in distributing love which is the most important wealth (premdhan). When she was in her wealthy mood (Aishwarya Vaab) she was Laxmipriya which have been transformed into Vishnupriya when she was in her love-devotion mood (Prem vakti vaab) due to Mahaprabhu's will and thus named Vishnupriya that is beloved of Vishnu. Some texts say that in Sri Krishna lila she appeared as Satyabhama that is incarnation of her Bhu(earth) form, the daughter of King Satrajit. Satyabhama was married to Sri Krishna and was one of the principle queen of Sri Krishna. King Satrajit from Sri Krishna lila appeared in Sri Gaura lila as Sri Sanatan Mishra. Mother Satyabhama appeared in the house of Sanatan Mishra as his daughter – Sri Vishnupriya devi. She is the 'Bhu Shakti' – Earth potency. Sri Krsna in His Narayan form or Vishnu tattva form has His divine Shakti [ Mahalaxmi] who herself manifested into three potencies – Sri laxmi (her divine valuables), Bhu laxmi (the Goddess of Earth in which she representes fertility and patience), and Nila laxmi (the Goddess of pastimes). Bhu is the energy that creates the cosmic manifestation (nicely explained in Sri Caitanya-Charitamrita Adi lila initial chapters). Bhu-sakti also assists in manifesting Sri Krsna’s pastimes in Vrindavan, the place of His pastimes as they are displayed on the Earth planet in this universe and innumerable other universes. The goddess of this Earth, Prithivi devi, is also included within this potency.

== See also ==
- Chaitanya Mahaprabhu
