= Mithijhora =

2023 Indian television series

- Genre: Drama; Romance
- Created by: Organic Studios
- Written by: Dialogues; Suparna Chakraborty
- Screenplay by: Sarbari Ghosal
- Story by: Leena Gangopadhyay
- Directed by: Joydeep Karmakar
- Starring: Aratrika Maity; Suman Dey
- Opening theme: "Jane Mithijhora Sob Jane Mithijhora"
- Ending theme: "Ek Pyaar Ka Nagma hai- Moujon ki Rawani hai"...
- Composer: Debojeet Ray
- Country of origin: India
- Original language: Bengali
- No. of seasons: 1
- No. of episodes: 418

Production
- Executive producers: Paromita Sengupta (Organinc Studios); Paromita and Aditi (Zee Bangla)
- Producer: Arka Ganguly
- Cinematography: Parmatva Yadav
- Editor: Sampriti Chakraborty
- Camera setup: Multi-camera
- Running time: 23-46 Mins
- Production company: Organic Studios

Original release
- Network: Zee Bangla
- Release: 27 November 2023 – 13 July 2025

Mithijhora was a 2023 Indian Bengali Romantic Drama television series that released on 27 November 2023 on Zee Bangla and went Off air on 13 July 2025. The series was produced under the banner of Organic Studios. It starred Aratrika Maity and Suman Dey in lead roles.

== Plot ==
Raipurna, Nilanjana, and Srotoswini are three sisters who love each other from deep in their heart. They have an elder brother, Vikram, who is physically impaired, and their father, Kingshuk, is the family's sole breadwinner. Raipurna is in love with Sourya, and the two plan to marry. However, Kingshuk dies on the day of their wedding. In order to take responsibility for her family, Raipurna arranges for Nilanjana and Sourya to marry instead, without their prior knowledge. As a result, everyone misunderstands Raipurna.

Nilanjana (Nilu) and Sourya face many obstacles and humiliation from her in-laws because Raipurna (Rai) was originally supposed to wed Sourya. Eventually, however, the situation returns to normal, and Nilu becomes pregnant with Sourya's child. Meanwhile, Srotoswini (Srot) repeatedly clashes with her medical university professor, Sarthak (SS).

As Rai is now the only earning member of her family, she takes a job as a secretary at a company. Due to various circumstances, however, she is required to cook for her boss, Anirban Sen, at his home in order to keep her job, despite not being fully qualified for the position. This leads to arguments between Rai and her family. Rai is later framed for supposedly stealing ₹23 lakh from Anirban's office. The police discover that she was framed by Anirban's friend, who is arrested and fired by Anirban. He threatens to return one day and destroy Anirban's life.

Anirban apologizes to Rai in front of the entire office, and she forgives him. Before leaving, Rai gives Anirban an envelope and instructs him not to open it until she is gone. Believing that Rai is merely taking paid leave, Anirban later opens the envelope and discovers her resignation letter. He goes to Rai's house to persuade her to withdraw her resignation, but is confronted by her mother and brother Vikram, who are angry about his treatment of Rai and his requirement that she cook for him. Meanwhile, Nilu's pregnancy is revealed to have been faked, and she is sent away to her maternal house.

== Cast ==
=== Main ===
- Aratrika Maity as Raipurna Sen (née Mukherjee) aka Rai (aka Anamika): A caring, responsible daughter of a middle class family; Nilu and Srot's elder sister; Anirban's wife; Billi's Mother.
- Suman Dey as Anirban Sen aka Ani aka Kutti: Rai's boss and love interest turned husband.

=== Recurring ===
- Debadrita Basu as Nilanjana Bhushan formerly Nilanjana Roy (née Mukherjee) aka Nilu: Rai and Vikram's younger sister and Srot's elder sister, Shourya's ex-wife, Kranti's wife.
- Mainak Banerjee as Kranti Bhushan: A vigilant dacoit like Robinhood; Nilu's second husband.
- Saptarshi Roy as Shourya Roy (Former Main Lead Turned to be Main Victim): Rai's ex-lover and Nilu's ex-husband. Rai and Nilu cheated with him and ruined his life.
- Mainak Dhol as Dr. Sarthak Sengupta aka SS: An angry young man, Srot's college lecturer and later husband.
- Swapnila Chakraborty as Srotoswini Sengupta (née Mukherjee) aka Srot: Rai, Nilu and Vikram's younger sister
- Poushmita Goswami as Nandita Mukherjee: Kingshuk's widow; Rai, Nilu, Srot and Vikram's mother.
- Debasish Roy Chowdhury as Late Kingshuk Mukherjee: Rai, Nilu, Srot and Vikram's father
- Jayati Chakraborty as Antara Mukherjee: Kingshuk's sister; Nandita's sister-in-law; Rai, Nilu, Srot and Vikram's paternal aunt
- Aniruddha Gupta / Sutirtha Saha as Vikram Mukherjee: A physically disabled person; Rai, Nilu and Srot's elder brother
- Puja Banik as Mishti Mukherjee: Vikram's wife; Rai, Nilu and Srot's elder sister-in-law
- Tramila Bhattacharya as Suchismita Roy: Tiklu, Sourya and Tiya's mother
- Saptarshi Ray as Avinash Roy: Tiklu, Shourya and Tiya's father
- Sanmitra Bhaumik as Tiklu Roy: Shourya's elder brother
- Riya Ganguly as Madhura Roy aka Dora: Tiklu's wife. She always bullied Nilu. She framed Neelu for making her father-in-law sick by giving him the wrong medicine. This truth has never been revealed to anyone or proven.
- Barninee Chakrabarty as Tiya Roy: Tiklu and Shourya's youngest sister
- Kunal Banerjee as Shourya's friend
- Aritra Goswami as Rahul: Shourya's friend
- Arnab Chowdhury as Raj: Nilu's ex-lover
- Esha Bhattacharjee as Dora's mother
- Krishnakishore Mukherjee / Biplab Dasgupta as Dr. Ujjwal Pranotosh Sengupta: A respected veteran doctor, Sarthak's father and Ayesha's maternal uncle.
- Rajiv Bose as Sudipto Chatterjee: Anirban's friend and business partner
- Shweta Chaudhuri as Shormi Bose: Anirban's cousin sister; Rai's sister-in-law and friend.
- Sourav Das as Mandar Bose: Anirban's cousin brother-in-law; Shormi's husband.
- Shyamashis Pahari as Ayesha's father
- Poonam Basak as Ayesha: Sarthak's paternal cousin sister and Srot's friend.
- Rajashree Bhowmik as Sohini Sen: Anirban's mother
- Sanjay Basu as Prosenjit Sen: Anirban's father
- Anamika Chakraborty as Koyel: Anirban's ex-wife; Rai's rival
- Chhandak Choudhury as Anjan: Rai's rescuer.
- Sukanya Basu as Isha: Anjan's wife; Rai's rescuer and friend.
- Gautam Shiddartha as Ranjan: Anjan's brother
- Madhumita Roy as Geeta: Ranjan's wife; Rai's friend.
- Soumi Paul as Mondira: Kranti's assistant.
- Debaparna Chakraborty Paul Chowdhury as Simran: Anirban's childhood friend and Rai's confidante
- Ayendri Lavnia Roy as Dr. Oindrila Chakraborty: A psychologist
- Mouli Bose Sarkar as Dr. Atreyee, Srot's friend.
- Swarnali Pandey
- Oeindrila Sengupta
- Tamal Bag
- Shuvam Banerjee
- Shivam Bakshi
