= Joyee =

Indian Bengali television series

- Inter Title
- Genre: Drama; Comedy; Romance
- Created by: Tent Cinema
- Developed by: Gangotri basu Urvi mukherjee
- Screenplay by: Malova Majumdar; Dialogues; Sambaran Dutta
- Story by: Sushanta Das; Sayantani Bhattacharya
- Directed by: Pijush Ghosh; Sushanta Das
- Starring: Debadrita Basu; Dibyojyoti Dutta; Dwaipayan Das; Mimi Dutta; Sanchari Mondal; Tanuka Chatterjee; Bidipta Chatterjee; Sananda Basak; Arun Bandyopadhyay
- Composer: Shuvam Moitra
- Country of origin: India
- Original language: Bengali
- No. of seasons: 1
- No. of episodes: 686

Production
- Executive producer: Urvi Mukherjee
- Producer: Sushanta Das
- Production location: Kolkata
- Running time: 22 minutes
- Production company: Tent Cinema

Original release
- Network: Zee Bangla
- Release: 9 October 2017 – 1 September 2019

Related
- Alo Chhaya

Joyee is a Bengali television soap opera that premiered on 9 October 2017. It aired on Zee Bangla. It was produced by Tent Cinema and it starred Debadrita Basu and Dibyojyoti Dutta. It also presents Sanchari Mondal, Mimi Dutta, Tanuka Chatterjee, and Dwaipayan Das in supporting roles. The show replaced Raadha. Arun Bandyopadhyay is the main antagonist. The show went off air on 1 September 2019 and it was replaced by another show titled Alo Chhaya.

== Plot ==
Joyee is the story of a fun-loving and innocent orphan girl. She lives with her maternal uncle and aunt and is a die-heart football lover. Her dream is to become a footballer. To break the barriers of social taboos, she often disguises as a boy to get to play. She has to give into her family's demands and she marries.

Thereon starts a different life. She is totally unaware about what is in store. Her in-laws are extremely conservative and believe that a woman's only job is to run a household and look after her husband. Her husband, Ribhu is extremely studious, almost a nerd who is clueless about his wife's liking for sport. The family has an aversion towards sports. Another antagonist is Sukumar, who is in love with Irabati (Ribhu's sister-in-law) and always tries to harm Joyee. Joyee uses her football skills of evasion and maneuver to survive as a wife and a family member. She remains determined to be a successful footballer.

A sad subplot involves Agni (Ribhu's Sejdabhai). He has been kidnapped by Sagar Dutta, a football coach who used to take money from innocent footballers. Agni wanted to catch Sagar Dutta red handed. Joyee's other aim is to find her Sejdabhai and to punish Sagar Dutta.

After six months, Joyee is back as Jessica who is a look-alike of Joyee and Joyee is back to take revenge from Sukumar. However, she is able to take the revenge.

== Cast ==
=== Main ===
- Dibyojyoti Dutta as Ribhu: Joyee's husband
- Debadrita Basu as Joyee / Jessica Fernandes / Malati / Patralekha: Ribhu's wife

=== Recurring ===
- Ranit Modak as Sukumar
- Sanchari Mondal as Irabati: Ribhu's Sister-in-law/Agni's wife
- Arun Banerjee as Bibi/Bisewar Banerjee
- Misty Das as Riya/Liza: Joyee's Sister/Ankhi
- Ankur Roy as Ranjan
- Soham Chakraborty as Chinku: Joyee-Ribhu's Son- He dreams to be a footballer one day like his mother.
- Alokananda Guha as Soumi
- Alivia Sarkar as Malini Sen
- Tanmay Majumdar as Ayan
- Mimi Dutta as Krishna: Ribhu's Sister-in-law
- Dwaipayan Das as Ribhu's Cousin
- Tanuka Chatterjee as Ribhu's Aunt/Jamuna
- Bidipta Chakraborty / Mayna Bandhopadhyay as Ribhu's Sister
- Sananda Basak as Churni: Ribhu's Sister-in-law.
- Sarbori Mukherjee as Aloka: Joyee's maternal Aunt
- Partha Sarathi Deb as Partha Sarathi Dasgupta: Ribhu's Father
- Joy Bhattacharya as Sagar Dutta
- Ayush Das as Bablu
- Mayna Banerjee as Mayurakshi: Ribhu's Elder Sister
- Anirban Ghosh as Arjun Dasgupta :Ribhu's Elder Brother
- Rajiv Bose as Agni Dasgupta/Sejdavai
- Dwaipayan Chakraborty as Ayan Bhattacharya: Torsha's Friend
- Aishi Bhattacharya as Torsha
- Surojit Banerjee as Ribhu's uncle
- Saptajayi Maji as Tomtom / Krishna's Son
- Sahana Sen as Anannya / Megha: Sukumar's Sister
- Sayantani Guhathakurta as Sudha / Joyee's Mother (flashback)
- Sourav Chakraborty as Swornedu: Joyee's Father
- Mritwika Oss as I.P.S. Sumana Roy
- Rishabh Das as teenage Tomtom
- Debika Mitra as Kaveri Dasgupta
- Biswarup Bandyopadhyay as Rony
- Ranjini Chatterjee as Sukumar's mother
- Elfina Mukherjee as Arjun's second wife
- Sayantani Sengupta as Mohua
- Saugata Bandyopadhyay as Somudro
