= Phulki (TV series) =

Indian Bengali television series

- Genre: Drama; Romance; Sports; Thriller
- Created by: Samrat Ghosh
- Written by: Dialogues; Saswati Ghosh
- Screenplay by: Saswati Ghosh
- Story by: Souvik Chakraborty
- Directed by: Rajendra Prasad Das
- Creative director: Srijit Ray
- Starring: Abhishek Bose; Divyani Mondal
- Opening theme: Niye Jibon Dolar Dulki, Jwole Bhalobasar Phulki… by Suvam Moitra
- Composer: Suvam Moitra
- Country of origin: India
- Original language: Bengali
- No. of seasons: 1
- No. of episodes: 901

Production
- Executive producers: Sauvik Kundu; Sreya Guha; Shubhangi Ghosh (Zee Bangla)
- Producer: Zee Bangla
- Production locations: Bharat Lakshmi Studio, Kolkata
- Cinematography: Santu Datta
- Editors: Jishu Nath; Biplab Mondal
- Camera setup: Multi-camera
- Running time: 22 minutes
- Production company: Zee Bangla In-house Production

Original release
- Network: Zee Bangla
- Release: 12 June 2023 – 7 December 2025

Phulki is a 2023 Indian Bengali romantic sports drama television series that premiered on 12 June 2023 on Zee Bangla. The show is produced by Zee Bangla. It stars Divyani Mondal and Abhishek Bose.

== Plot ==
Phulki is a passionate love story. Phulki, a bright and mentally strong underprivileged girl, while the male protagonist, Rohit, an ex-boxer who is trying to cope with his past trauma of disgrace and the burden of being responsible for his brother’s death.

While Rohit is trapped in the past, phulki deals with life’s problems positively and wants to move ahead. They meet and get married. Phulki slowly and steadily brings in a positive vibe in Rohit's life and the family and shows a new way of living to the Rohit. But she gets disheartened to learn that Rohit still loves his ex-wife, Shalini. On the other hand, Rohit tries to find a new way of living by realising his dream of being a champion boxer through Phulki and at the same time can’t forget his past with Shalini. While dealing with his past and present simultaneously, Rohit realises what is best for him. Phulki found her genetic mother and she was the inheritor of Rajmahal state.

== Cast ==
=== Main ===
- Divyani Mondal as Phulki Dasgupta (née Das, Formerly Roy Chowdhury): A vivacious girl; An international boxer and elected minister; Former employee in Roy Chowdhury's superstore; Rohit's widow; Aruna's ex daughter-in-law, Aranya's wife, Phuljhuri's mother.
- Abhishek Bose as
  - Priyojeet Roy Chowdhury: Aruna's husband, Rohit and Dhanu's father. (Dead)
  - Rohit Roy Chowdhury: An ex-boxer; a successful business man and owner of a superstore; Boxing Coach of Anushilani (Boxing Academy); Priyojeet and Aruna's son; Phulki's husband, Phuljhuri's father. (Dead)
  - Aranya Dasgupta aka ADG: A singer and chef, Rohit's lookalike, Phulki's well wisher and second husband.

=== Recurring ===
- Ankita Majhi as Aruna Roy Chowdhury: Headmistress of Nababganj High School; Pallab's ex-student; Rohit and Dhanu's mother
- Sohan Bandyopadhyay as Pallab Roy Chowdhury aka Mastermashai: A professor and a political leader; Former Chairman of Bongiyo Upokul Party, Chairman of Janata Unnayan Party, Haimanti's husband; Tathagata and Labanya's father
- Mishka Halim as Haimanti Roy Chowdhury: Pallab's wife; Tathagata and Labanya's mother
- Avery Singha Roy as Kaberi Roy Chowdhury: Sayantan's wife; Tamal and Piyal's mother
- Sanjay Basu as Sayantan Roy Chowdhury aka Shanu: Rohit's younger paternal uncle; Tamal and Piyal's father
- Arpita Mondal as Labanya Sanyal aka Labu (née Roy Chowdhury): Haimanti and Pallab's daughter; MLA in Nababganj; Member of Janata Unnayan Party.
- Kaushambi Chakraborty as Paromita Sengupta (Formerly Roy Chowdhury) aka Paro: Haimanti and Pallab's ex-daughter-in-law (Dead)
- Ayendri Lavnia Roy as Ishita Paul (Formerly Roy Chowdhury): Tamal's ex wife
- Sudip Sarkar as Rudraroop Sanyal aka Rudra/Rajababu (Main Antagonist): A corrupt politician; Son of Biru Badshah aka Birupaksha Sanyal. (Dead)
- Ridhish Chowdhury as Tamal Roy Chowdhury: Sayantan and Kaberi's elder son; Jhinuk husband
- Mishmee Das as Jhinuk Roy Chowdhury (née Das) aka Madhabilata (Fake identity): Sabita and Satyen's biological daughter; Tamal's love interest turned to be second wife
- Debmalya Gupta as Piyal Roy Chowdhury: Youngest Son of Roy Chowdhury family; Sayantan and Kaberi's younger son
- Ujjayini Chattopadhyay / Piyali Sasmal as Dhanshiri Roy Chowdhury aka Dhanu: A lawyer; Aruna's daughter
- Srijita Dona Chakraborty as Payel Roy Chowdhury: Piyal's friend and love-interest turned wife.
- Fahim Mirza as Angshuman Sengupta aka Angshu: A IPS officer, Former officer in-charge of Nababganj Police Station; SP of Rajmahal State; Paromita's college friend and second husband; Ricky's one-sided love interest but he loves Paromita from their college days.
- Banani Dey as Rankini Sanyal aka Ricky: Daughter of Biru Badshah aka Birupaksha Sanyal; Rudra's younger sister; Angshuman's obsessive lover.
- Sharly Modak as Shalini Mitra: A boxer; Rohit's ex-wife turned rival; Phulki's rival; Rudra's crime partner.
- Gulshanara Khatun as Sabita Das: Chief Nurse of Nababganj Government General Hospital, Satyen's wife; Phulki's adoptive mother; Jhinuk's biological mother.
- Indraneel Chakraborty as Satyen Das: Sabita's husband; Phulki's adoptive father; Jhinuk's biological father.
- Arup Roy as Bhombol: Phulki's neighbour.
- Rajib Banerjee as Maharaja Pratap Narayan Chowdhury: Boro Raja from Rajmahal estate; Mandira's husband; Phulki's biological father; Rohit's father-in-law.
- Moyna Mukherjee as Rani Mandira Chowdhury: Boro Rani from Rajmahal estate; Pratap's wife; Phulki's biological mother; Rohit's mother-in-law.
- Saoli Chattopadhyay as Rani Ashabari Chowdhury: Chhoto Rani and former MLA in Rajmahal estate; Dhurjoti's wife; Aditya and Indra's mother; Dhanu's mother-in-law; Phulki's paternal aunt.
- Manoj Ojha as Maharaja Dhurjoti Narayan Chowdhury: Chhoto Raja from Rajmahal estate; Ashabari's husband; Aditya and Indra's father; Dhanu's father-in-law; Phulki's paternal uncle.
- Sounak Roy as Rajkumar Aditya Narayan Chowdhury: Boro Rajkumar from Rajmahal estate; Dhurjoti and Ashabari's elder son; Phulki's cousin; Dhanu's husband.
- Arunava Dey as Rajkumar Indra Narayan Chowdhury: Chhoto Rajkumar from Rajmahal estate; Dhurjoti and Ashabari's younger son; Phulki's cousin.
- Raju Majumder as Nantu: Phulki's neighbour, he had a crush on Phulki.
- Aditi Ghosh as Sneha: A callgirl, who works for Rudra.
- Deepak Halder as Bibhuti Baba: A fake saint.
- Kaustuv Sengupta as Mr Banerjee: A Lawyer; Dhanu's senior.
- Bhavana Banerjee as Jiya Banerjee: An ambitious boxer, who could do anything to win; Phulki's rival to friend.
- Sulagna Chakraborty as Basanti Murmu: A boxer; Phulki's friend & supporter.
- Suchandrima as Madhubanti Chowdhury: Chief Editor of Naba Prabhat Media House.
- Sharanya Dey as Chhandak Majumder: Ishita's college friend; Joyeeta's husband.
- Purbasha Debnath as Late Joyeeta Majumdar (née Dutta): Ishita's college friend; Chhandak's wife.
- Joy Badlani as Senior Inspector Atul Pandey: From Delhi Crime Branch, who came to West Bengal to investigate the case of Rajababu.
- Akashdeep Akash as Rahul Dey aka Borobabu: A corrupt police officer who's working for Rudrarup Sanyal; Angshuman's senior.
- Manish Chakraborty
- Arghya Basu
- Subir Basu as Pandit Ajay Sen: Opposition Leader of Nababganj, Payel's father.
- Rupam Sarkar as Mihir.
- Raja Chatterjee as Doctor Kaka: A Well-Wisher and a Family Physician of Roy Chowdhury family.
- Oeandrila Banerjee as Kamalika Basu: Owner of a PR agency; She helped Phulki to save Rohit from false allegations.
- Judhajit Banerjee as Dr. Satyabrata Dutta: Rudra's crime partner; Shalini's doctor.
- Anindyo Sarkar as Tarak Sengupta: A Retired Police Officer; Angshuman's father; Paromita's father-in-law.
- Mallika Sinha Roy as Pratibha Sengupta: Angshuman's mother; Paromita's mother-in-law.
- Achin Kumar Moitro as Thakur Baba: Rudra's another rival.
- Subikash Paul as Mrinmoy: Rudrarup Sanyal's political worker.
- Sneha Chatterjee as Agnimita Guhaneogi: A Dancer; Workshopper in correctional home; Aruna's ex-student.
- Paromita Mukherjee as Tagar: A notorious criminal; Rudra sent her to Jail to kill Ishita.
- Nilanjan Datta as Dr. Subramaniam Phulki’s Eye Surgeon.
- Susmita Chakraborty as Malati Sarkar: From Kuli Bosti; Malati steals her mother-in-law's necklace and blames it on their house-help Lachhmi aka disguised Haimanti.
- Konkona Halder as IPS Swagata Roy: Additional SP in Rajmahal Estate.
- Shilpa Mondal as Shilpa Roy: Phulki's closed one; Former employee of nutritionist at Games Village; She gets a job at Roy Chowdhury's Superstore after her termination from Games Village; Sanatan & Bharati's daughter.
- Somjita Bhattacharya as Sarbani Roy: The one who witnessed the dark conspiracy of Ashabari & Rajmahal; Shilpa's mother; Sanatan's widow.
- Satyam Chowdhury as Sanatan Roy: Shilpa's father; Bharati's husband; A servant in Rajmahal; He left newborn Phulki as Ashabari told him. Then, he was consumed by regret. And decided to expose Ashabari's conspiracy to his Highness "Boro Raja Babu". But before he could, Ashabari killed him.
- Rana Mukherjee as Shouvik; Ashabari's aide.
- Arghya Mukherjee as Sitaram Choubey: A Truck-dealer; Ashabari's crime partner in Boro Rajababu's murder; Later murdered due to Ashabari's conspiracy.
- Rana Mitra as Rathilal Chakraborty : Ashabhari's lawyer.
- Sujoy Sinha as Judge Ashu Babu
- Tanushree Goswami as Sunanda Samajpoti: Leader of Bongiyo Progotishil Party.
- Ashim Roy Chowdhury as Akhilesh Dey : A Minister of Jatiya Samajtantrik Committee.
- Mrinmoy Das as Durjoy
- Gautam Mukherjee
- Joy Bhattacharya as Chamanlal Bajoriya
- Arijeet Ganguly
- Partha Mitra
- Unknown as Minister Akhilesh Dey's mother
- Alivia Sarkar as Sheena Lohia; Rohit's one sided obsessive lover.
- Saumya Sengupta as Sheena's father.
- Rumi Mukherjee
- Sankar Sanku Chakrabarty
- Soma Banerjee as Damayanti Kar aka Daizy Bai
- Ashmita Chakraborty as Ahona Biswas
- Soumi Paul
- Anamika Chakraborty as Ritu Roy: A international spy.

=== Guest appearance on "Janmashtami" special episode ===
- Pallavi Sharma as Alokparna Dutta from Neem Phooler Madhu.
- Uday Pratap Singh as Chayan Dutta from Neem Phooler Madhu.
- Soumi Chakraborty as Ruchira Mitra aka Ruchi from Neem Phooler Madhu.
- Shaili Bhattacharya as Barsha Dutta from Neem Phooler Madhu.

=== Guest appearance on "Durga Puja" special episode ===
- Neil Chatterjee as himself.
- Ashmita Chakraborty as herself.

== Adaptations ==
Language	Title	Original release	Network(s)	Last aired	Notes	Ref.
Bengali	Phulki ফুলকি	12 June 2023	Zee Bangla	7 December 2025	Original	
Telugu	Jayam జయం	14 July 2025	Zee Telugu	Ongoing	Remake	

== Reception ==
Week	Year	BARC Viewership		Ref.
Week	Year	TRP	Rank	Ref.
Week 24	2023	7.2	2	
Week 25	2023	7.4	2	
Week 26	2023	7.9	2	
Week 27	2023	7.7	3	
Week 28	2023	7.3	3	
Week 29	2023	8.2	3	
Week 30	2023	8.5	3	
Week 31	2023	8.1	3	
Week 32	2023	8.4	2	
Week 33	2023	7.6	3	
Week 34	2023	7.9	3	
Week 35	2023	7.5	3	
Week 36	2023	8.3	2	
Week 37	2023	7.8	3	
Week 38	2023	7.9	3	
Week 39	2023	8.0	2	
Week 40	2023	7.8	2	
Week 41	2023	7.6	2	
Week 42	2023	6.9	4	
Week 43	2023	6.4	3	
Week 44	2023	7.6	2	
Week 45	2023	7.8	2	
Week 46	2023	7.0	3	
Week 47	2023	7.6	2	
Week 48	2023	8.0	2	
Week 49	2023	8.5	1	
Week 50	2023	7.9	3	
Week 51	2023	8.5	3	
Week 52	2023	8.6	3	
Week 1	2024	8.7	3	
Week 2	2024	8.2	2	
Week 3	2024	8.4	2	
Week 4	2024	8.1	2	
Week 5	2024	8.3	2	
Week 6	2024	8.7	2	
Week 7	2024	8.1	3	
Week 8	2024	8.5	3	
Week 9	2024	8.3	3	
Week 10	2024	8.0	3	
Week 11	2024	8.0	1	
Week 12	2024	8.4	1	
Week 13	2024	7.6	2	
Week 14	2024	7.6	2	
Week 15	2024	7.6	2	
Week 16	2024	7.7	1	
Week 17	2024	7.0	1	
Week 18	2024	6.6	1	
Week 19	2024	5.9	3	
Week 20	2024	6.5	2	
Week 21	2024	6.8	2	
Week 22	2024	6.8	1	
Week 23	2024	7.0	1	
Week 24	2024	6.7	1	
Week 25	2024	7.0	2	
Week 26	2024	7.5	2	
Week 27	2024	7.6	1	
Week 28	2024	7.2	1	
Week 29	2024	7.1	1	
Week 30	2024	6.5	4	
Week 31	2024	6.8	2	
Week 32	2024	7.0	3	
Week 33	2024	7.5	1	
Week 34	2024	6.6	2	
Week 35	2024	7.1	3	
Week 36	2024	7.1	2	
Week 37	2024	7.1	2	
Week 38	2024	7.3	1	
Week 39	2024	7.2	3	
Week 40	2024	7.1	1	
Week 41	2024	6.6	1	
Week 42	2024	7.2	1	
Week 43	2024	7.7	1	
Week 44	2024	7.2	1	
Week 45	2024	7.7	1	
Week 46	2024	7.1	1	
Week 47	2024	7.3	1	
Week 48	2024	6.9	4	
Week 49	2024	7.0	2	
Week 50	2024	7.4	1	
Week 51	2024	7.9	1	
Week 52	2024	8.1	2	
Week 53	2024	7.7	3	
Week 1	2025	7.7	2	
Week 2	2025	8.0	2	
Week 3	2025	7.8	2	
Week 4	2025	7.2	3	
Week 5	2025	7.5	2	
Week 6	2025	7.5	2	
Week 7	2025	7.3	3	
Week 8	2025	6.6	3	
Week 9	2025	6.4	3	
Week 10	2025	6.1	6	
Week 11	2025	6.6	3	
Week 12	2025	6.8	2	
Week 13	2025	6.9	2	
Week 14	2025	7.0	1	
Week 15	2025	6.9	2	
Week 16	2025	6.5	3	
Week 17	2025	6.1	2	
Week 18	2025	6.3	3	
Week 19	2025	6.0	4	
Week 20	2025	5.9	3	
Week 21	2025	6.5	4	
Week 22	2025	6.4	2	
Week 23	2025	6.7	1	
Week 24	2025	7.0	2	
Week 25	2025	7.3	2	
Week 26	2025	7.2	3	
Week 27	2025	7.1	2	
Week 28	2025	6.9	2	
Week 29	2025	6.9	2	
Week 30	2025	6.4	5	
