= Aratrika Maity =

Indian Bengali actress and model

- Born: 13 December 2004 (age 21); Jhargram, West Bengal
- Occupations: Actress, Dancer
- Years active: 2019–present
- Known for: Khelna Bari; Mithijhora; Jowar Bhanta; [Agnishikha]]
- Mother: Moumita Maity

Aratrika Maity is an Indian actress and model who works in Bengali television industry. She is best known for portrayals in television soap operas Khelna Bari and Mithijhora. She received an award at Zee Bangla's annual event which is commonly known as zee banglar sonar sansar (2026).

== Early life and education ==
Aratrika was born in Jhargram, West Bengal, India. She completed her schooling from Netajinagar Balika Vidya Mandir and later got enrolled at Ramkrishna Mission Sarada Mancha for higher studies.

== Career ==
Maity began her career with a supporting role in the soap opera Karunamoyee Rani Rashmoni (Zee Bangla). She got her first lead role in the daily soap Agnishikha (Sun Bangla). She gained further recognition with Khelna Bari which aired on Zee Bangla. She made her debut on big screen in the film Lawho Gouranger Naam Rey as Lakshmipriya.

== Television ==
=== Serials ===
Year	Serial	Character	Channel	Role	Production House	Notes
2019	Karunamoyee Rani Rashmoni	Padma Dasi	Zee Bangla	Episodic Role (Debut)	Subrata Roy Production	Special Appearance
2021	Agnishikha	Shikha	Sun Bangla	Lead Role	Friends Communication	
2022-2023	Khelna Bari	Mitul Lahiri (née Paul)	Zee Bangla	Lead Role	Zee Bangla Productions	
2023-2025	Mithijhora	Raipurna Sen (née Mukherjee)	Zee Bangla	Lead Role	Organic Studios	
2025-Present	Jowar Bhanta	Ujjwala Banerjee (née Mitra) aka Uji	Zee Bangla	Lead Role	Tent Cinema	

=== Mahalaya ===
Year	Title	Role	Channel	Notes
2022	Singhabahini Trinayani	Devi Mahalakshmi	Zee Bangla	
2023	Nobopotrikaye Debibaran	Devi Raktadantika	Zee Bangla	
2024	Noborupe Debi Durga	Devi Kalratri	Zee Bangla	
2024	Mahisasurmardini	Devi Bhubaneshwari, Katayani and Mahisasurmardini	Telly Durga	
2025	Jago Maa Jago Durga	Devi Koushiki	Zee Bangla	
2026	Asubhanashini Trinayani	Devi Bhadrakali	Zee Bangla	

== Films ==
Year	Movie	Role	Director	Notes	Ref.
2025	Lawho Gouranger Naam Rey	Lakshmipriya	Srijit Mukherjee		
