= Debadrita Basu =

Indian actress

- Born: Debadrita Basu; 3 January 2001 (age 25); Chakdaha, West Bengal, India
- Occupation: Actress
- Partner: Rahul Dev Bose
- Relatives: Sanjay Basu (father); Debopriya Basu (sister); Bidesh Ranjan Bose (grandfather)

Debadrita Basu (born 3 October 2001) is an Indian Bengali television and theatre actress. Although her career started with stage plays, she is best known for playing the lead roles of Joyee in the serial Joyee and Alo in the serial Alo Chhaya, both of which aired on Zee Bangla. She played Rajkumari Meera / Meerabai in the mythological serial Shree Krishna Bhakto Meera on Star Jalsha, Alo in the serial Alor Theekana on Sun Bangla, and the antagonist role of Nilu in the serial Mithijhora on Zee Bangla.

== Early life ==
Basu was born in Chakdaha, West Bengal to Sanjay and Shukla Basu. She is the granddaughter of famous footballer Bidesh Basu. She has a younger sister, Debopriya Basu, who is also an actress.

Basu's acting career started with the theater group Ha Za Ba Ra La at the age of 8. While still in school, she began theatre practice with her father. Drohi Choitonnya was her first theater drama. She got an opportunity to work in TV serials through auditioning.

== Career ==
Basu played the lead role in the serial Joyee on the Bengali channel Zee Bangla, in Kolkata.

She played Alo Sengupta, the titular protagonist in the soap opera Alo Chhaya.

She was last seen as Meerabai in the mythological drama Shree Krishna Bhakto Meera on Star Jalsha, which unexpectedly stopped airing due to the show's low popularity.

Since 2022, Basu has played Alo, the main protagonist in the daily soap Alor Theekana on Sun Bangla.

== Television ==
=== Television series ===
Year	Title	Role	Channel	Notes	Ref(s)
2017–2019	Joyee	Joyee/Jessica	Zee Bangla	Debut, lead role	
2019–2021	Alo Chhaya	Alo Sengupta (née Chatterjee)	Zee Bangla	Lead role	
2021	Shree Krishna Bhakto Meera	Meerabai	Star Jalsha	Lead role	
2022–2023	Alor Theekana	Alo	Sun Bangla	Lead role	
2023–2025	Mithijhora	Nilanjana aka Nilu	Zee Bangla	3rd lead. Positive to negative and again switched to positive.	
2026–present	Kamala Nibas	Pallabi	Zee Bangla	Lead role	

=== Mahalaya ===
Year	Title	Role	Channel
2018	Shaktirupeno	Devi Bipodtarini	Zee Bangla
2019	Baro Maashe Baro Rupe Debiboron	Devi Falharini and Jagadhatri	Zee Bangla
2020	Durga Saptashati Sambhavami Yuge Yuge	Devi Jogomaya	Zee Bangla
2022	Debi Doshomahavidya	Devi Chinnamasta	Colors Bangla
2026	Asubhanashini Trinayani	Devi Shivaduti	Zee Bangla

== Awards ==
Year	Award show	Category	Role	Serial
2018	Zee Bangla Sonar Sansar	Sera Bou	Joyee	Joyee
2018	Zee Bangla Sonar Sansar	Sera Juti	Joyee-Ribhu	Joyee
2019	Zee Bangla Sonar Sansar	Sera Bouma	Joyee	Joyee
2020	Zee Bangla Sonar Sansar	Sera Meye	Alo	Alo Chhaya
2021	Zee Bangla Sonar Sansar	Priyo Bou	Alo	Alo Chhaya
2021	Kolkata GlitZ Awards 2021	Young Achiever Female (Popular Choice)	Alo	Alo Chhaya
2024	Tollystar Awards 2024	Performer of the Year		
2024	Tolly and Cine Somman 2024	Best Actor in a Supporting Role	Nilanjana	Mithijhora
2025	Zee Bangla Sonar Sansar	Priyo Kholnayika	Nilanjana	Mithijhora
