= Abhishek Bose =

Indian television and film actor

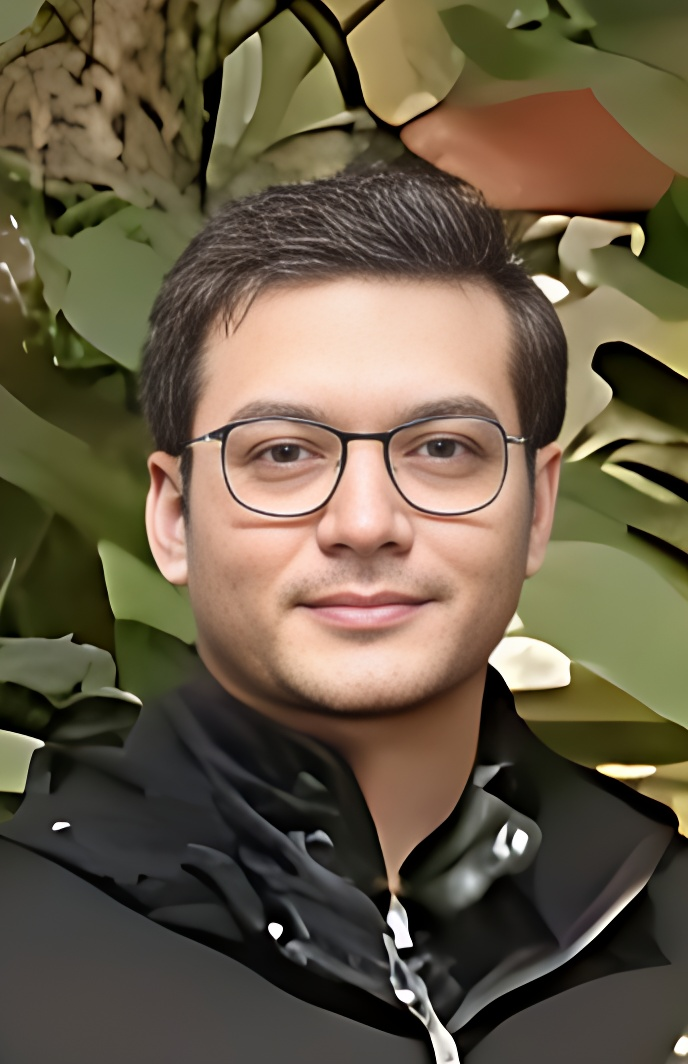
- Born: 8 October; Kolkata, India
- Occupation: Actor
- Notable work: Netaji
- Spouse: Sharly Modak (married 2025–present)

Abhishek Bose is an Indian Bengali television actor and dancer who works in Bengali television serials and films. He is known for his role in Netaji, Seemarekha, Bojhena Se Bojhena, Gangaram, Phulki and others.

== Television ==
Year	Show	Channel	Notes	Roles	Production company
2013-2016	Bojhena Se Bojhena	Star Jalsha	Arko Singha Roy	Supporting Role	Shree Venkatesh Films
2014-2016	Maa Durga	Colors Bangla	Vishnu	Supporting Role	Shree Venkatesh Films
2016	Goyenda Ginni	Zee Bangla	Raj Ghosh	Episodic Role	Shree Venkatesh Films
2017	Bhakter Bhogobaan Shri Krishna	Star Jalsha	Ramchandra Arjuna	Episodic Role Supporting Role	Surinder Films
2017-2019	Seemarekha	Zee Bangla	Jeet a.k.a. Priyojeet Mitra / Sounak	Leading Role	Surinder Films
2019-2020	Netaji	Zee Bangla	Netaji Subhas Chandra Bose	Leading Role	Surinder Films
2020-2022	Gangaram	Star Jalsha	Gangaram Roy	Leading Role	Blues Production
2022-2023	Aalta Phoring	Star Jalsha	Arjun Chatterjee	Leading Role	Tent Cinema
2023–2025	Phulki	Zee Bangla	Rohit Roy Chowdhury	Leading Role	Zee Bangla In-house Production

== Mahalaya ==
Year	Title	Role	Channel	Notes
2015	Mahishasuramarddini	Shree Vishnu	Colors Bangla	
2016	Durga Durgatinashini	Shree Vishnu	Colors Bangla	
2018	Shaktiroopena	Mahadev	Zee Bangla	
2019	Baaro Maase Baaro Roope Debiboron	Mahadev	Zee Bangla	
2020	Durga Saptashati Sambhavami Yuge Yuge	Mahadev	Zee Bangla	
2022	Yaa Chandi	Mahadev	Star Jalsha	
2023	Nobopotrikaye Debiboron	Mahadev	Zee Bangla	
2024	Nabaroope Devi Durga	Mahadev	Zee Bangla	
2026	Asubhanashini Trinayani	Ramchandra	Zee Bangla	

== Filmography ==
Year	Film	Language	Notes
2003	Chokher Bali	Bengali	Basanta
2009	Go For Goals	Bengali	Rudra
2017	One	Bengali	Ayan

== Reality shows ==
Year	Show	Channel	Notes
2018	DIdi No. 1	Zee Bangla	
2022	Dance Dance Junior Season 3	Star Jalsha	Captain

== Awards ==
Year	Award	Category	Serial	Character	Result
2018	Zee Bangla Sonar Sansar Award	Best Actor Male in a Supporting Role	Seemarekha	Jeet	Won
2020	Zee Bangla Sonar Sansar Award	Best Actor in a Leading Role	Netaji	Subhash	Won
2021	Star Jalsha Parivaar Award	Best Actor in a Comic Role	Gangaram	Gangaram	Won
2024	Zee Bangla Sonar Sansar Award	Best Son	Phulki	Rohit	Won
2025	Zee Bangla Sonar Sansar Award	Best Husband	Phulki	Rohit	Won
