= Sani Ghose Ray =

Indian film producer

- Born: Kolkata
- Occupations: Film Director and Producer
- Notable work: Nagarkirtan
- Awards: National Film Awards

Sani Ghose Ray is an Indian Film director and producer based out of Kolkata. He is also one of the founder members of the production house Acropoliis Entertainment along with a line production company Greyscale Entertainment.

The movie Nagarkirtan produced by Sani Ghose Ray has won Special Jury Award at National Film Awards in 2017.

== Film career ==
Ghose Ray began his career by assisting directors such as Rituparno Ghosh, Sudeshna Roy, and Abhijit Guha. He worked as an Executive Producer / Line Producer / Associate Director on films such as Abohomaan, Sunglass, Khela, Sob Charitra Kalponik, Noukadubi by Rituparno Ghosh, Raavan by Mani Ratnam, Tamasha by Imtiaz Ali, and others, as well as nonfiction TV shows such as "Ghosh & Co.", anchored by Rituparno Ghosh.

=== As producer ===
In 2006, Ghose Ray started Acropoliis Entertainment, a film production company based in Kolkata, along with Snigdha Sumit Basu, Sumit Tinkari Basu and Rajnish Jaichandra Hedao.

Ghose Ray started his entrepreneurial journey with television in 2009. He has produced around 25 TV serials for Star Jalsha, Zee Bangla, and Colors Bangla, including Raashi, Agnipariksha, Bodhuboron, Mon Phagun, Kamala O Sriman Prithwiraj, Gaatchora and others.

In 2017, he produced Nagarkirtan, directed by Kaushik Ganguly, under the banner of Acropoliis Entertainment. At the 65th National Film Awards, Ghose Ray received National Film Award – Special Jury Award (feature film) for this film.

The film received four National Awards (Special Jury Awards, Feature Film, Best Makeup, and Best Costume), as well as the National Film Award for Best Actor for Riddhi Sen.

=== As director ===
In 2020, Ghose Ray debuted as a director with 'Bonyo Premer Golpo' on Hoichoi. It was one of the platform's most popular shows. With OTT programmes like Srikanto, Ray gradually established himself as a director.

In 2023, he directed Swethkali (a psychological thriller) for ZEE5, which has become the platform's most successful programme to date. Ghose Ray's other OTT series 'Jaatishawr' is also released at Hoichoi OTT platform.

== Filmography ==
=== Movies ===
S.No.	Year	Film/TV Series	Role
1	2019	Nagarkirtan	Producer
2	2009	Cross Connection	Producer

=== Web series ===
S.No.	Year	Film/TV Series	Platform	Role	
1	2023	Jaatishawr	Hoichoi	Producer and Director	Web series
2	2023	Shwetkali	ZEE5	Producer and Director	Web series
3	2022	Hostel Days	Hoichoi	Producer	Web series
4	2022	Srikanto	Hoichoi	Producer and Director	Web series
5	2020	Bonyo Premer Golpo2	Hoichoi	Producer and Director	Web series
6	2020	Bonyo Premer Golpo	Hoichoi	Producer and Director	Web series

=== TV series ===
S.No.	Year	Film/TV Series	Channel	Role
1	2023 – present	Tunte	Star Jalsha	Producer
2	2023 – present	Kamala O Sreeman Prithwiraj	Star Jalsha	Producer
3	2022 – present	Tumii Je Amar Maa	Colors Bangla	Producer
4	2021 – present	Gaatchora	Star Jalsha	Producer
5	2022–2023	Shaheber Chithi	Star Jalsha	Producer
6	2021–2022	Mon Phagun	Star Jalsha	Producer
7	2021	Rimli	Zee Bangla	Producer
8	2020–2021	Ogo Nirupoma	Star Jalsha	Producer
9	2020–2021	Phirki	Zee Bangla	Producer
10	2020–2021	Dhrubatara	Star Jalsha	Producer
11	2019–2021	Saanjher Baati	Star Jalsha	Producer
12	2019	Sasurbari Zindabad	Colors Bangla	Produce
13	2019	Sagarika	Sun Bangla	Producer
14	2018–2020	Irabotir Chupkotha	Star Jalsha	Producer
15	2018	Ardhangini	Star Jalsha	Producer
16	2017–2020	Bokul Kotha	Zee Bangla	Producer
17	2017	Debipaksha	Star Jalsha	Producer
18	2016–2017	Aamar Durga	Zee Bangla	Producer
19	2016–2017	Membou	Star Jalsha	Producer
20	2015–2017	Milon Tithi	Star Jalsha	Producer
21	2014–2015	Jani Dekha Hobe	Star Jalsha	Producer
22	2014–2015	Hoyto Tomari Jonno	Colors Bangla	Producer
23	2014–2015	Raaikishori	Zee Bangla	Producer
24	2013–2017	Bodhuboron	Star Jalsha	Producer
25	2011–2015	Raashi	Zee Bangla	Producer
26	2009	Agnipariksha	Zee Bangla	Producer
