= Acropoliis =

Indian film production company

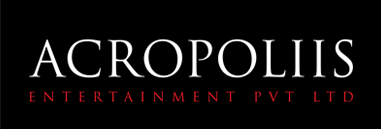
- Industry: Entertainment
- Founded: 6 October 2006
- Founders: Snigdha Sumit Basu, Sumit Tinkari Basu and Rajnish Jaichandra Hedao, Sani Ghose Ray
- Headquarters: Kolkata, India
- Products: Television programs, motion pictures, radio and other entertainment activities

Acropoliis Entertainment Private Limited, commonly known as Acropoliis, is an Indian Bengali-language television serial and film production company based in Kolkata, incorporated on 6 October 2006. Acropoliis Entertainment Private Limited has 4 creative directors/key management personnel- Snigdha Sumit Basu, Sumit Tinkari Basu, Rajnish Jaichandra Hedao and Sani Ghose Ray. They started off with shows like "Agnipariksha" and "Raashi", and went on to produce many more popular shows on Bengali Television, the most notable ones being- Bodhuboron, Milon Tithi, Membou, Aamar Durga, Bokul Kotha, Irabotir Chupkotha, Sanjher Baati, Dhrubatara, Mon Phagun, Gaatchora, Akash Kusum, Shaheber Chithi, Tumii Je Amar Maa, Shubho Bibaho, Kusum and Milon Hobe Koto Dine.

== Film productions ==
- Cross Connection (2009)
- Nagarkirtan (2019)
- Nari Choritro Bejay Jotil (2026)

== Web series ==
Title	Director	Production year	OTT platform
Bonyo Premer Golpo	Sani Ghose Ray	2020	Hoichoi
Bonyo Premer Golpo 2	Sani Ghose Ray	2020	Hoichoi
Black Widows	Birsa Dasgupta	2020	ZEE5
Srikanto	Sani Ghose Ray	2022	Hoichoi
Shwetkali	Sani Ghose Ray	2023	ZEE5
Jaatishawr	Sani Ghose Ray	2023	Hoichoi

== TV shows ==
=== Current ===
Show	Channel	Premiere date
Kusum	Zee Bangla	4 June 2025 – present
Saat Paake Bandha	Zee Bangla	18 March 2026 – present

=== Former ===
Production year(s)	Title	Network	Genre	First aired	Last aired	Episode count
2009–2014	Agnipariksha	Zee Bangla	Drama	10 June 2009	5 April 2014	1533
2011–2015	Raashi	Zee Bangla	Romance Drama	31 January 2011	11 July 2015	1396
2013–2017	Bodhuboron	Star Jalsha	Family Drama Romance	19 August 2013	29 January 2017	1163
2014–2015	Raaikishori	Zee Bangla	Romance Drama	10 February 2014	28 March 2015	351
2014–2015	Hoyto Tomari Jonno	Colors Bangla	Family Romance	15 December 2014	4 July 2015	173
2014–2015	Jani Dekha Hobe	Star Jalsha	Romance Thriller Drama	29 December 2014	6 June 2015	139
2015–2017	Milon Tithi	Star Jalsha	Family Drama Romance Thriller	23 November 2015	20 August 2017	587
2016–2017	Membou	Star Jalsha	Family Drama; Horror Comedy Romance	19 September 2016	14 May 2017	238
2016–2017	Aamar Durga	Zee Bangla	Political Drama Family Comedy Romance	18 January 2016	21 October 2017	553
2017	Debipaksha	Star Jalsha	Drama Family Romance	30 January 2017	28 May 2017	118
2017–2020	Bokul Kotha	Zee Bangla	Family Drama Romance	4 December 2017	1 February 2020	674
2018	Ardhangini	Star Jalsha	Drama Family Romance	8 January 2018	18 November 2018	306
2018–2020	Irabotir Chupkotha	Star Jalsha	Romance Drama Family	3 September 2018	2 August 2020	594
2019	Sagarika	Sun Bangla	Sports Drama	3 February 2019	25 August 2019	203
2019	Sasurbari Zindabad	Colors Bangla	Comedy Romance	10 June 2019	30 August 2019	60
2019–2021	Sanjher Baati	Star Jalsha	Social Drama Thriller Romance	1 July 2019	12 December 2021	806
2020–2021	Dhrubatara	Star Jalsha	Romance Drama Thriller	27 January 2020	19 September 2021	500
2020–2021	Phirki	Zee Bangla	Drama Social Romance	3 February 2020	2 January 2021	225
2020–2021	Ogo Nirupoma	Star Jalsha	Romance Drama	5 October 2020	1 August 2021	297
2021	Rimli	Zee Bangla	Drama Romance Family	15 February 2021	26 September 2021	217
2021–2022	Mon Phagun	Star Jalsha	Drama Romance	26 July 2021	21 August 2022	386
2021–2023	Gaatchora	Star Jalsha	Romance Drama Family	20 December 2021	14 December 2023	720
2022–2024	Tumii Je Amar Maa	Colors Bangla	Drama Romance Family	6 June 2022	4 February 2024	607
2022–2023	Shaheber Chithi	Star Jalsha	Drama Romance Family	27 June 2022	22 January 2023	210
2023	Kamala O Sreeman Prithwiraj	Star Jalsha	Historical drama Comedy Romance	13 March 2023	19 November 2023	251
2023–2024	Tunte	Star Jalsha	Drama Romance	5 June 2023	11 January 2024	219
2024–2025	Akash Kusum	Sun Bangla	Drama Romance Family	29 January 2024	30 August 2025	670
2024–2026	Shubho Bibaho	Star Jalsha	Drama Romance Family	17 June 2024	24 February 2026	608
2025–2026	Milon Hobe Koto Dine	Star Jalsha	Drama Romance Family	1 December 2025	12 June 2026	185
