= Raja Paarvai (TV series) =

Indian television series

- Genre: Soap opera
- Starring: Munaf Rahman; Rashmi Jayaraj; Vikash Sampath
- Country of origin: India
- Original language: Tamil
- No. of seasons: 1
- No. of episodes: 207

Production
- Camera setup: Multi-camera
- Running time: 22 minutes

Original release
- Network: Star Vijay
- Release: 22 March – 18 December 2021

Related
- Sanjher Baati

Raja Paarvai is an Indian Tamil television series on Star Vijay. It premiered on 22 March 2021. It is a remake of Star Jalsha's Bengali series Sanjher Baati starring Munaf Rahman and Rashmi Jayaraj.

== Plot ==
It is a story of a man who becomes visually impaired after an accident whose life begins to have a positive change after meeting a girl.

== Cast ==
=== Main ===
- Munaf "Munna" Rahman as Anand: Aravind's brother; Charu's husband; Mahalakshmi and Viswanathan's son
- Rashmi Jayaraj as Charu: Chandran's daughter; Pavithra's half-sister; Anand's wife

=== Recurring ===
- Vikash Sampath as Aravind: Amirtha's former love interest; Anand's younger brother; Mahalakshmi and Viswanathan's son; Pavithra's husband
- Keerthi Vijay as Pavithra: Chandran and Kokila's daughter; Charu's younger half-sister; Aravind's wife
- Anandhi Ajay as Vanmathi (main antagonist)
- Yalini Rajan as Amirtha: Aravind's former love interest
- Aarthi Ramkumar as Mahalakshmi: Anand, Aravind & Aarthi's mother; Viswanathan's wife; Vishalstchi's sister-in-law; Sadhana's enemy
- Bhagyalakshmi
- Sivan Sreenivasan as Viswanathan: Anand and Aravind father; Mahalakshmi husband
- Girish as Chandran: Kokila's 2nd husband; Charu and Pavithra's father
- Shiva Kavitha as Kokila: Chandran's 2nd wife; Pavithra's mother; Charu's stepmother
- Mahesh as Balaji: Kokila's younger brother; Chandran's brother-in-law
- Revathee Shankar as Meenatchi and Viswanathan's mother
- Revathi Priya as Vishalstchi: Mahalakshmi's sister-in-law; Rahul's mother
- Hari Krishnan
- SK Karthick as Maaran
- Sharnita Ravi as Aarthi
- Master Deepesh as Rahul
- VJ Darsu Riey as Vandhana: Sadhana's daughter; Anand's enemy
- Deepa Nethran
- Kirubaa as Sadhana: Mahalakshmi's enemy
- Sudha
- Vignesh as Vaasu
- Krishnakumar as Ranga

== Adaptations ==
Language	Title	Premiere date	Network(s)	Last aired	Notes
Bengali	Saanjher Baati সাঁঝের বাতি	1 July 2019	Star Jalsha	12 December 2021	Original
Hindi	Aapki Nazron Ne Samjha आपकी नज़रो ने समझा	2 March 2021	StarPlus	9 October 2021	Remake
Tamil	Raja Paarvai ராஜ பார்வை	22 March 2021	Star Vijay	18 December 2021	Remake
Kannada	Akashadeepa ಆಕಾಶದೀಪ	21 June 2021	Star Suvarna	30 January 2022	Remake
Telugu	Krishnamma Kalipindhi Iddarini కృష్ణమ్మ కలిపింది ఇద్దరినీ	9 May 2023	Star Maa	23 September 2023	Remake
