= Tanima Sen =

Bengali film and television actress

- Occupations: Actress, director

Tanima Sen is a Bengali film and television actress.

== Acting career ==
=== Theatre ===
Though Sen is mainly popular as a film and television actress, she started as a theatre artist. In 1984, she made her acting debut in a local theatre group. In 1985, she acted in a play named Baluchari, which was staged at the Star Theatre, Kolkata and continued for 500 shows. Besides acting, she has written plays. A play, Swarger Kache, was staged by Bengali theatre group Rangmahal.

In 1994, she started her own theatre group, Shyambazar Apalak.

=== Television ===
In 1995–96, Sen was first cast in a television serial, Jodi Emon Hoto. She has worked in serials like Janmabhumi, Roopkotha, Labonyer Sangsar, Swaragini-Jodein Rishton Ke Sur and Pandemonium.

== Filmography ==
=== Films ===
- Gogoler Kirti
- Obhishopto Nighty
- Classmate (2012) (Unreleased) actor
- Pather Sesh Kothay (2012) director, producer, story
- Prem By Chance (2010) actor
- Bondhu Eso Tumi (2010) actor
- Brake Fail (2009) actor
- Premer Phande Kakatua (2009) actor
- Bor Aasbe Ekhuni (2008) actor
- Jinon Rang Berang (2008)
- Ghare & Baire (2018)
- Konttho (2019)
- Pataligunjer Putul Khela (2025)
- Shreeman v/s Shreemati (2025)

=== Television ===
- Janmabhumi
- Roopkotha
- Labonyer Sangsar
- Sasuri Zindabad (Zee Bangla)
- Bibi Chowdhurani as Bibi and Mini's Grandmother.( Zee Bangla)
- Swaragini - Jodein Rishton Ke Sur as Shobha Bose. (Colors)
- Premer Phande as Rishi's Grandmother(Zee Bangla)
- Pandemonium
- Kajallata as Shobha ( Colours Bangla)
- Devi Chaudhurani (TV Show) as Brojeswar's Grandmother. (Star Jalsha)
- Soudaminir Songshar as Harisadhan's elder Sister.(Zee Bangla)
- Ranna Banna (Anchor now replaced by (Aparajita Adhay) along with Raktim Mitra) (Star Jalsha)
- Phirki as Sunanda Singha Roy (Zee Bangla)
- Sanjher Baati as Bonolata Dastidaar.( Star Jalsha)

=== Plays ===
- Baluchari (1985)
- Kacher Putul
- Swikarakti
- Ghar- Jamai (1989)
- Swarger Kache (playwright)

== Awards ==
- Zee Bangla award for 1) "Dhyattarika" and 2) "Labonnoyer Sansar" (twice)
- Uttam Kumar Smriti Award (twice)
- Hemanta Kumar Smriti (memorial) award.
- Shyamal Mitra Smriti (memorial) award.
- Shubendu Smriti (memorial) award.
- Pramathesh Barua Smriti (memorial) award.
- Vivek Samman award.
- Dishari Award for her roles in theatre.

== See also ==
- Paran Bandopadhyay
- Anusuya Majumdar
