= Debipaksha (TV series) =

- Genre: Drama, romance, crime
- Written by: Ashita Banerjee; Sayan Chowdhury
- Directed by: Babu Banik
- Starring: Indrajeet Bose; Geetashree Roy; Chandrayee Ghosh; Aditi Chatterjee; Manishankar chaterjee; Bharat Kaul
- Opening theme: Debipakshya
- Country of origin: India
- Original language: Bengali
- No. of episodes: 118

Production
- Producers: Snigdha Basu; Suni Ghose Roy
- Running time: 22 Minutes
- Production company: Acropoliis Entertainment Pvt. Ltd.

Original release
- Network: Star Jalsha
- Release: 30 January – 28 May 2017

Related
- Bodhuboron; Kundo Phooler Mala

Debipaksha (Bengali: দেবীপক্ষ) was a Bengali television series which aired on Star Jalsha from 30 January to 28 May 2017 at 6 pm. It is loosely based on Sarat Chandra Chattopadhyay's 1917 novel, Devdas, the series tells the story of Surya (Indrajeet Bose) and Devi (Geetashree Roy) (who were also shown as a couple Ujjal and Raashi in Zee Bangla's popular drama Raashi) from childhood sweethearts to sworn enemies.

== Plot ==
Surya, the prince of the utopian community of Surajgarh, returns after fifteen years abroad. He is reunited with his childhood friend, Devi, and their wedding is announced. Surya learns that the community's prosperity is based on illegal smuggling begun by his grandfather, and for the sake of their people he joins the business. Surya's stepmother, Amma, fears losing control; she plots against the wedding and sabotages Surya who is caught in a crossfire with police.

Surya's grandfather, Dadaji, begins to suspect Amma and delegates all decisions to Shivaji, his chief advisor and Devi's father. To drive the families apart, Amma frames Devi's brother, Prabal, for molesting Surya's sister, Anu. Surya and Devi are able to exonerate Prabal, but Amma then manipulates them into proceeding with the wedding and Anu into thinking her family doesn't care about her. Anu spoils Devi's bridal henna and later attempts suicide. Fearing what else might happen, Surya tries to elope with Devi, but Amma catches them and the wedding plans continue.

On the night of the wedding, Amma diverts Shivaji with a rumour of a police raid on their explosives factory. Devi is distraught and leaves the wedding when Amma declares that her father is dead. Devi and her brothers recover Shivaji's body and Dadaji falls gravely ill at the sight of his dead friend. The sacred thread from Surya's wrist, which represented Surya and Devi's faith in each other, is found at the scene of the explosion (planted by Amma's agents). Devi is horrified and declares it murder, vowing revenge on Surya and his family.

With Dadaji bedridden, Shivaji dead and Surya heartbroken, Amma rises to power. Her allies are outraged at the betrayal but find themselves outmaneuvered. Seeming to delight in the pain and betrayal, Anu confesses her part to Surya and how Amma has gained power and respect. Devi performs funeral rites for her father, then assumes his position with the people and urges them to boycott the smuggling. Amma is sent to jail for her sins and the family members are reunited.

== Cast ==
Dev Burman Family

- Indrajeet Bose as Surya Dev Burman :Surya is the son of Pratap Dev Burman (Adhishwar's eldest son) and the eldest grandson of Adhishwar Dev Burman. His respect for Amma influences his perception towards others, and he is unwilling to do anything that might upset his stepmother. On the other hand, he claims to love Devi enough to die for her. Despite living outside of Surajgarh for many years, he seamlessly adapts to the fabric of his hometown and displays ruthlessness and courage when ambushed by police at the pier. Surya is skilled with weapons and can ride a horse and play the piano. After Shivaji's murder, Devi breaks all ties with him and his family. This devastates Surya, but he believes that if his love is true, Devi will eventually return to him. The name Surya means Sun in Bengali and refers to the God of the Sun.
- Chandrayee Ghosh as Raj Rajeshwari Dev Burman, commonly "Ammaji" : Raj-Rajeshwari (called Rajeshwari by Pratap and Dadaji) is the second wife of Pratap Dev Burman, though their relationship is strained. She is respectfully referred to as Amma, by all the children and subjects of Surajgarh. Though she pretends to be a dutiful daughter-in-law, she secretly plots to overthrow Dadaji to gain control of Surajgarh. She detests the entire Chowdhury family as she thinks of Shivaji as a competitor for the throne. Rajeshwari has several spies scattered throughout the empire, who bring her updates and do her bidding. She uses her brother, Ajit; brother-in-law, Sanjay and sister-in-law, Madhavi to do her bidding. She is merciless and will even kill to achieve her goals. The name Rajeshwari means Goddess Parvati or Queen.
- Mrinal Mukherjee / Manishankar Banerjee as Adhishwar Dev Burman, commonly "Dadaji" : Adhishwar is Surya's grandfather and the Godfather of Surajgarh. He is called Dadaji by everyone and is known to be a just and fair ruler. His word is the law in Surajgarh. Under his reign, the town has peacefully flourished. Dadaji trusts Shivaji, Devi's father more than anyone and credits him with having an equal hand in the creation of Surajgarh. Though only three of his children have been introduced, there is a suggestion that he has one more son, younger than the rest as Sanjay is often referred to as the middle brother. The name Adhishwar in Bengali means Lord Vishnu, the Hindu protector and preserver of the universe, responsible for restoring the balance between good and evil.
- Surajit Banerjee as Pratap Dev Burman: Pratap is Surya's father and is completely detached from the world of business and politics. He is the eldest child of Adhishwar Dev Burman but has no ambition in inheriting his legacy or empire. Absorbed in arts and culture, Pratap spends his time practising classical music. He is an idealist and a loving father, who wishes for his children to live their lives with freedom and choice. Pratap also has a soft spot for Devi, whom he taught music for several years. He approves of Surya and Devi's marriage. The name Pratap means dignity and majesty in Bengali.
- Sreetama Roy Chowdhury as Anusree Dev Burman, commonly "Anu" : Anusree is Surya's younger sister, who is vibrant and lively. She has feelings for Prabal and pursues him relentlessly even though he continually rejects her advances. On her birthday, she is assaulted and the blame is imputed to Prabal. At his trial, Amma forces Anu to lie so that Prabal is punished. The name Anusree in Bengali means the Goddess Lakshmi, Hindu Goddess of wealth, fortune and prosperity. Anusree can also mean 'pretty'.
- Ashish Dev as Uday Dev Burman: Uday Dev Burman is Surya and Anu's brother. Uday is younger than Anu, but older than Arna. He appears to be cheerful and lively. The name Uday means 'to rise' in Bengali.
- Anirban Guha as Sanjay Dev Burman: Sanjay is Adhishwar's younger son, and father of Debu and Arna. He appears to be mild in nature and is gullible. He is manipulated by Rajeshwari into believing that Shivaji is using Devi and Surya's wedding to gain control of Surajgarh. Sanjay allies with Rajeshwari to fight for what he believes to be his birthright. He is eventually deceived by Amma. The name Sanjay is a reference to Sanjaya, the adviser and charioteer of Mahabharata's blind King Dhritarashtra, who has the gift of foresight.
- Pinky Mallik as Vandana Dev Burman : Vandana is Sanjay's wife and Debu and Arna's mother. She is Adhishwar Dev Burman's younger daughter-in-law. Vandana is soft-spoken, respectful and kind-hearted. She urges Sanjay to make honourable choices rather than blindly following Rajeshwari's bidding. Vandana is also quietly confident and calculating. After Shivaji's murder and Amma's rise to power, it is revealed that Vandana had already known about Amma's ambitious nature. Vandana understood that Amma had strategically removed Shivaji and had only been using Sanjay and Madhavi the whole time.
- Suvajit Kar as Devarsi Dev Burman: Devarsi (referred to as Debu) is Sanjay and Vandana's elder child. He is the younger cousin of Surya but is older than Anusree. Debu is level-headed, practical, observant and analytical. He is best friends with Irfan, and has a secret relationship with Irfan's sister, Amina. Devarsi in Bengali means 'the wise one amongst Gods'.
- Suranjana Roy as Arna Dev: Arna is Surya and Anusree's cousin and Debu's younger sister. Arna is sensible and responsible. She regularly urges Anu to keep herself in check, and when Prabal is being accused of molesting Anu, Arna encourages Anu to speak the truth at the trial to save Prabal. Arna demonstrates qualities of being observant and intelligent as she is the first to determine that Anu had been forced to lie about Prabal through Amma's intimidations. The name Arna means the Goddess Lakshmi, who is the Hindu Goddess of wealth, fortune and prosperity.
- Aditi Chatterjee as Madhavi Dev Burman: Madhavi is Surya's paternal aunt, whose beauty masks her dubious intentions. She is the youngest of Adhishwar's children. Opportunistic and manipulative, she supports Rajeshwari's conspiracy to sabotage Surya and Devi's wedding. She lies at Prabal's trial by testifying that she had witnessed Prabal harassing Anu in the past when she knew that Anu was the one who openly pursued Prabal. Madhavi's husband, Sundar, lives with his wife's family and shows no interest in anything but easy income. He is lazy and is bossed around by Dadaji and Madhavi. Madhavi and Sundar have two daughters together, Puja and Manju. The name Madhavi means creeper with beautiful flowers.
- Shankar Debnath as Madhavi's husband
- Subhrajit Dutta as Ajit : Raj Rajeshwari's brother and always a part of her evil plans.
- Amrita Debnath as Mili Dev Burman : Uday's pretending-to-be wife and is most probably Imlee i.e. Devi's sister who didn't live with the Chowdhury family. She is very much aware of Amma's evil plots and would go to any extent for protecting the Dev Burman family from Amma's conspiracy.

Chowdhury Family

- Geetashree Roy as Devi Chowdhury: Devi is the middle child of Shivaji and Pratima Chowdhury. Though she loves Surya, she values her family's respect and everyone's feelings over her own. Devi was musically trained by Pratap Dev Burman, Surya's father who adores her. Devi is an artisan and a skilled archer, and shows determination and resolve in a crisis. When her father is murdered and slandered by the Dev Burman family, she vows to take revenge. The name Devi means Goddess in Bengali.
- Bharat Kaul as Shivaji Chowdhury : Shivaji is Devi's father and Dadaji's most trusted adviser. He is married to Pratima, and they have three children. He is next in line to Surajgarh's leadership but does not desire it. Just and fair, Shivaji abides strictly by Dadaji's laws, upholding Dadaji's every command even if it comes at the expense of his family. He is fiercely protective of Devi. Shivaji also suspects Rajeshwari's intentions. On the night of his daughter's wedding, Shivaji is murdered by Amma and Ajit. The name Shivaji means Lord Shiva, who in Hindu mythology is regarded as a creator, transformer and destroyer of the world. He is also regarded as the destroyer of ego.
- Kaushiki Guha as Pratima Chowdhury: Pratima is Shivaji's wife, and mother of Prabal, Devi and Ajay. She is the only person in Surajgarh who prays to a God other than Ma Jagadamba. Pratima is a devotee of the God of love, Krishna, and believes that love conquers all evil. She does not like the violent foundation of Surajgarh but has steeled herself, knowing that there is no alternative in the town. When Surya and Devi's wedding is announced, Pratima is the happiest because she knows how long Devi waited for Surya. She is distrustful of Rajeshwari and is the first to realise that there is a conspiracy being hatched to frame Prabal of molesting Anu. The name Pratima means icon, idol or statue in Bengali.
- Raj Bhattacharya as Prabal Chowdhury : Prabal is the reserved, dutiful elder brother of Devi and Ajay. Unlike all the other men of Surajgarh, he is mild in nature. He is respectful, responsible and conservative, choosing not to entertain Anu's attentions as he is more concerned about Devi's reputation as the future daughter-in-law of the Dev Burman family. Prabal takes after his mother and feels repulsed by violence and warfare. He disapproves of the smuggling business that Surajgarh is founded upon. He has feelings for Anusree Dev Burman but has never expressed it even though Anu frequently tries to coax him into reciprocating her advances. He is wrongfully punished for molesting Anu. After his father's death, he becomes more ruthless and willing to fight, but despite being the eldest child, he passes on his father's position to his younger sister, Devi because he believes her to be more deserving. In Bengali Prabal means coral, or very strong.
- Ajay Chowdhury: Ajay is playful and less reserved than Prabal. He is a skilled fighter and does not show any reluctance in training for self-defense. Like everyone else in his family, he is protective of Devi. He is cheeky and cheerful, often finding excuses to tease his sister. After his father's death, Ajay's resolve becomes even stronger and he vows to stand by his sister to avenge their father's death. In Bengali, the name Ajay means unconquerable.
- Imlee Chowdhury: First mentioned at Devi's holud ceremony, Imlee is the youngest child of the Chowdhury family. She is absent due to studying abroad. In Bengali, the name, Imlee means tamarind.

Khan Family

- Rehmat Khan (played by Kaushik Chakraborty) Rehmat is Dadaji's loyal bodyguard, and a close friend of Shivaji. He oversees much of Dadaji's business and the protection of Surajgarh, and is merciless when he believes a wrong to have been committed. He disapproves of outsiders and strictly forbids the use of technology in the town. He is level-headed and practical, looking to rationally solve problems. He is the father of Irfan, Amina and Rukhsar. Rehmat is seen to be training Prabal and Ajay in self-defence and is close to the Chowdhury family. At Prabal's trial, when Anu blames Prabal, Rehmat protests that there must have been a mistake. Rehmat means mercy.
- Nadira Khan: Rehmat's wife, Nadira is the local healer of Surajgarh. She practices herbal and Ayurveda medicine and has treated almost everyone at Surajgarh. When Surya is shot, Nadira cleans the wound and nurses him back to health. She supports Pratima at Prabal's trial and tries to console her. She also prays for wedded bliss for Devi and Surya. Nadira means pinnacle.
- Irfan Khan: Irfan is Surya's friend and a valuable member of the Dev Burman business. He oversees most dealings and is proficient with weapons. Honest and hard-working, Irfan has a good sense of humour and is well-liked throughout Surajgarh. Dadaji trusts Irfan with the safety of his family and the business. Irfan has an addiction to gambling, and though he seems to be good at it, his mother and sisters disapprove of his habit. Though he bets on almost anything, he will never gamble with another person's life. He is loyal to both the Dev Burman family and the Chowdhury family. He appears to have feelings for Surya's cousin, Arna Dev Burman. Irfan means knowledge and gratitude.
- Amina Khan: Rehmat's elder daughter and Devi's loyal friend. She is seen to be patient and calm, always supporting Devi and the Chowdhury family. Amina means truthful and trustworthy.
- Rukhsar Khan: The youngest of Rehmat's children, Rukhsar is a happy-go-lucky girl, who is always smiling. Like Irfan, she is humorous and good-natured, always looking for an opportunity to tease Devi about Surya. The name Rukhsar means cheeky.
