= Sanchari Mondal =

Bengali actress

- Born: Sanchari Mondal
- Citizenship: Indian
- Occupation: Actor
- Notable work: Joyee
- Spouse: Sangit Tewari (m. 2020)

Sanchari Mondal is an Indian actress who works in Bengali-language TV serials and films, notable for playing Irabati in Joyee which was broadcast on Zee Bangla. She has also appeared in the television serials, Goyenda Ginni as Disha, Bhalobasa.com and Amar Durga. and as Charulata in the film Gulshan and on the 'Zait' series of Sananda TV.

== Personal life ==
In 2020, Sanchari Mondal married Sangit Tewari, a fellow actor. The couple had been dating for some time before their engagement in 2018.

== TV series ==
- Goyenda Ginni as Disha (2016–2017)
- Bhalobasa.com
- Amar Durga as Torsha Mitra (2017–2019) (episodic role)
- Joyee as Irabati (2016–2017)
- Milon Tithi as Ginia
- Irabotir Chupkotha as Anushree (2019–2020)
- Nojor as Tina Singha Roy (in disguise) Jamini (2019–2020)
- Dhrubatara as Chandni Chowdhury (2020–2021)
- Rimli as Koyena (2021)
- Gaatchora as Kiara (2021- 2022) (replaced by Ankushree Maity)
- Malabodol
- Bullet Sorojini
- Anurager Chhowa
- Parineeta (2026) as Monali Mukherjee

== Film ==
- Gulshan
