= Saanjher Baati =

Indian television series

- Also known as: Saanjher Baati - Notun Prithibi
- Genre: Drama; Romance; Thriller
- Created by: Acropoliis Entertainment
- Developed by: Acropoliis Entertainment
- Screenplay by: Jyoti Hazra & Payel Chakraborty; Dialogues; Baitanik Mukherjee
- Story by: Acropoliis Creative Team
- Directed by: Sajal Bose
- Creative director: Proshen (Acropoliis)
- Starring: Debchandrima Singha Roy; Rezwan Rabbani Sheikh
- Theme music composer: Shantajit; Ronit
- Opening theme: "Saanjher Bati"
- Country of origin: India
- Original language: Bengali
- No. of episodes: 806

Production
- Executive producers: Arnab & Abir (Acropoliis); Samajita, Saptara & Shruti (Star Jalsha)
- Producers: Snigdha Basu; Sani Ghosh Ray
- Cinematography: Suman Mallick
- Editors: Nilanjan; Deepak
- Camera setup: Multi-camera
- Running time: 22 minutes
- Production company: Acropoliis Entertainment

Original release
- Network: Star Jalsha
- Release: 1 July 2019 – 12 December 2021

Saanjher Baati (transl. Evening Light) is a 2019 Indian Bengali romantic drama thriller television series that premiered on 1 July 2019 on Star Jalsha. The show is produced by Acropolis Entertainment Pvt. Ltd. The show aired its last episode on 12 December 2021, leaving the story incomplete. It starred Debchandrima Singha Roy and Rezwan Rabbani Sheikh.

== Synopsis ==
Saanjher Baati showcases a sweet and beautiful love story filled with emotions, conflicts, and heartwarming moments. The show traces the lives of Charu and Arjoman and their journey of rising above norms that define relationships. At the core of the story is the relationship between the protagonists and how they strive to fulfill each other's dreams and complement each other in pursuing their passion. Initially the story focused on the love story of Charu, a simple village girl and a sweet maker, and Arjo, a blind businessman. However, they met their tragic death due to Surjasekhar and Mishmi and their souls get reincarnated into Chitrangada, a rich girl and a photographer, and Arjun, a mechanic, and the story focused on Arjun and Chitrangada's romance.

== Plot ==
Charu, a simple, attractive village girl and a dedicated sweet-maker of the village Madhabpur (which is famous for sweets), becomes an object of envy for her stepmother, Jhumpa, and stepsister Chumki. While Chumki many times express her envy and hatred, Jhumpa always tries to be sweet to Charu while Charu lovingly calls her Maa(which apparently jhumpa doesn't deserve). With kindness and courage as her biggest strengths, she endures all hardships inflicted by them with a smile. Charu harbors a dream to fulfill her passion for making sweets. She yearns to open her sweet shop, but due to circumstances, fails to do so. Fate intervenes when she marries Arjoman (a blind man), son of North Kolkata's Mullick family, the well-known sweet-makers of the city, and begins a love story and Jhumpa gets Chumki married to Arjo's younger brother Angshu as a deal with Arjo's mother Mollika.

Jhumpa tried lots of tricks like manipulating and sending Charu to thrash person Fatik so that Fatik can marry her. Charu escapes by injuring him. After Arjo and Charu's marriage, Jhumpa, Chumki, and Sohini(Arjo's paternal aunt) plot to separate them, but they stay united after overcoming obstacles. Jhumpa and Fatik tries to get Charu framed in Fatik's fake murder and Chumki supports them. However they gets exposed. Fatik is arrested while Jhumpa is thrown out of the house but after a fake suicide attempt she comes back to stay with Charu's father Bhanu. Charu and Mollika becomes strict towards Chumki to make her a good person leaving Chumki more engraged. Also Angshu is angry at her for her greedy nature and pathological lies. However, one day, Arjo is pushed from the stairs by Chumki so that she can foil Charu and Arjo's honeymoon. Charu decides to get an injured Arjo operated and Arjo gets his eyes back. Arjo is excited to see the world and specially his Charu while the Mullicks praise Charu. But the happiness is short lived as Madan(Jhumpa's ex-husband) brutally injures Arjo according to Jhumpa's plan. Charu is blamed for everything by a devastated Mollika and thus, Mollika expels her from the house. Charu decides to donate her eyes to Arjo to regain his consciousness. However Charu gets fatally hit by Madan's car as per Madan and Jhumpa's plan. Dejected by Charu's demise, the Mullicks, according to Sohini's request, introduces Mishmi as Charu to Arjo after he regains his sight, to hide the truth. Somewhere in her heart Chumki is genuinely devastated by Charu's death. However she hates Mishmi. Charu is fortunately alive and after regaining consciousness, Charu refuses to return to the Mullicks and continues to stay with Dr. Banerjee and his sister Amrita (Angshu's love interest), and his daughter Chini (actually it was Angshu and Amrita's daughter). One day, Arjo meets real Charu, unaware that she is his wife, and Charu too hides her identity and adopts a new name, Chandrima. Charu joins a blind school and Arjo cooperates with her. Meanwhile, Arjo and Charu grow closer, which makes Mishmi realize that Chandrima is the real Charu, and so she decides to kill her, with the help of her father Surjasekhar, who was Mullick's closest enemy and a named criminal. Jhumpa and Madan tries to kill Bhanu but Charu and Arjo saves him. Arjo later identifies Charu and joins Charu's plan. Mishmi and Surjasekhar plots to destroy the Mulicks, and Charu, along with Amrita, disguise themselves to ruin their plan. Surjoshekhar kills Bhanu and attempts to kill Charu, but she is rescued by Arjo and thus after her brain surgery and eyes donated by Bhanu, she regains eyesight. Sohini and her son Ronit, who were also involved in Surjasekhar's plan to unsurp Mullick property, reform their ways and regrets their misdeeds. Mishmi tries to kill Chumki as Chumki always double crossed them. After Charu saves her Chumki decides to reform and get Surjoshekhar and Mishmi exposed. The Mullicks unitedly expose Surjasekhar and Mishmi to the police. However, Surjasekhar escapes from the jail, and Mishmi is released due to Ronit's request. Chumki regrets her deeds and apologies to everyone. Chumki divorces Angshu, and he marries Amrita and adopts Chini. Mollika and Charu asks Chumki to stay with them. Jhumpa comes back with a fake sympathy story and hence she is allowed to stay in the house. Mishmi starts plotting against Charu and Arjo and she bribes the doctor and proves to Arjo that he cannot become a father. This leads Arjo to misunderstand Charu's pregnancy, and so Charu leaves the house again. Arjo reforms his ways and brings her back after his requests.

Mishmi with the help of Jhumpa misleads Charu's mother, Sheuli, who was alive, to kill Charu, and adds poison to the sweets in her factory and frames Arjo for the same. After this Surjasekhar kidnaps Chini, Arjo spots him and while trying to escape, he fakes his death in an accident. Jhumpa and Mishmi plans to kill Charu and her unborn baby but they fails and Mishmi is exposed by Charu while Jhumpa escapes. Later, Sheuli identifies Charu and confesses her crimes. Jhumpa with her accomplish Fatik tries to kill Sheuli and Charu to run away with Sheuli's jewellery. However Charu saves herself and Jhumpa gets injured. Meanwhile, Surjasekhar returns to kill Charu and he throws a bomb inside Charu's car, which blasts, causing her death. Devastated and agitated, Arjo shoots Surjasekhar and thus gets arrested. Meanwhile, Jhumpa hits Charu, who actually had survived the blast and was lying half-dead on the ground, and snatches her jewellery. Mishmi, her brother Mohit, and Jhumpa plan to impersonate Mishmi's daughter as Charu's daughter to the Mullicks. Arjo mourns and laments Charu's death and decides to kill Mishmi and Mohit, after he gets released. On the other hand, Charu is rescued by a stranger named Deepjoy.

=== 18 years later ===
Arjo is released from jail after serving 14 years and now he lives with a dual identity, as a photographer and a secret agent, Captain Azad. Charu loses her memory and now she adopts a new name, Anushree, and lives happily with Deepjoy and her blind daughter, Bhumi. Also on the other hand, the Mullicks raise Srimon, unaware that it is Mishmi and Ronit's daughter. At North-Bengal, Arjo arrives for a secret mission and he meets Bhumi on the way, unaware that it is his daughter. Bhumi, after meeting him, wishes to pursue photography and become a famous photographer just like him, but she is unaware that he is her biological father. At the past, it is shown that Deepjoy admitted Charu to the hospital, where he requests doctor to save both, mother and baby, unaware of Charu's identity. Then Charu gave birth to a baby girl and names her Bhumi.

Bhumi arrives at Kolkata along with Arjo to study at a prestigious college, which makes Srimon jealous. However, he meets Charu but is later surprised to learn that Charu is Anushree, Deepjoy's wife and Charu's lookalike. Also, the Mullick family is shocked to see Anushree resembling Charu and they decides to testify her and so, they befriends Anushree and Bhumi. Meanwhile, Arjo learns about their new threat in their city, a terrorist operation conducted by a woman named 'Bari Amma' and Deepjoy was also a major part in that operation. Deepjoy uses Anushree (aka Charu) as his trump card to conduct the operations.

Arjo leaves Kolkata for some days for his mission and he allows Anushree and Bhumi to stay at his house. During their stay, Anushree's actions starts reminding her of Charu, suddenly. Also, Bhumi and Srimon meets their new instructor named Ayush, with whom she falls in love, but he likes Bhumi and rejects Srimon. Meanwhile, Deepjoy falls for Anushree and decides to give up his evil ways, much against Bari Amma and Mohit's will. At the past, it is shown that Deepjoy was instructed by Bari Amma and Mohit to pose as Charu's husband and Bhumi's father, since she is suffering from amnesia.

After returning to Kolkata, Arjo starts his mission to catch the terrorists and Bari Amma uses Anushree to conduct her operation. But suddenly, Anushree and Arjo come closer accidentally. And they goes hiding at Charu's hut in Madhabpur, after Arjo gets shot by Deepjoy. After some days, Anushree regains her memories and realises that she is the real Charu, and thus, reconciles with Arjo. Also Arjo learns that Bhumi is his daughter. Also Deepjoy learns from Bari Amma that Anushree is Charu Mallick. Furious, Deepjoy question Bari Amma about the reason behind hiding her identity, to which she replies that she wanted to exact revenge from the Mullick family. Further, he is instructed by Bari Amma to instigate Bhumi against Arjo.

Also, Bari Amma reveals to Mohit that Surjasekhar is alive and brings him back. Later Surjasekhar reveals to Ayesha (aka Bari Amma) that Deepjoy is actually Mollika's eldest son who was separated from her by Surjasekhar, since birth as he replaced Mollika's baby with a dead one and handed him over to Bari Amma. Surjasekhar instigates Deepjoy against the Mullicks and instructs him to kill Swami Radhemohan, who was actually Sohini's husband and Ronit's father. Bhumi requests Arjo to stay away from her mother. Also Bhumi and Charu return to the Mullick mansion and the family goes for a trip as per Bhumi's request, as a part of a plan by Deepjoy. Deepjoy tries to kill Arjo, but is shocked when Surjasekhar proves him that Anushree had regained her memories. Further, Surjasekhar confesses the truth to Deepjoy that he is Mollika's eldest son, but weaves a false story and instigates him against Mollika.

Arjo and Charu escapes, but suddenly Mishmi arrives in disguise and pretends to help them, as part of her plan. Charu reveals to Bhumi that Arjo is her father, which shocks the latter, and Arjo also reveals to the family that Anushree is actually Charu. Arjo and Charu enters Deepjoy's lair and searches for proofs, but is shocked to see that all illegal documents contains Charu's signature. On the other hand, Surjasekhar reveals Deepjoy's truth to Mollika and the latter threatens to harm Arjo. Also Deepjoy's henchmen tries to kill Swami Radhemohan, but is saved by Charu and Chumki. In a bid to save Arjo's life, Mollika agrees to Surjasekhar's conditions. Arjo and Charu confronts Dipjoy for his intentions, to which the latter replies that Mollika is responsible for Deepjoy's transformation to a terrorist. Arjo requests Deepjoy not to do anything wrong. At home, Chumki curses Jhumpa and decides to throw her out of the house, but the family stops her. Next day, Arjo and Charu prepares for Bhumi and Srimon's eighteenth birthday. But suddenly Arjo falls prey to Mishmi's trap and he is taken hostage by her. Deepjoy has a change of heart after Swami Radhemohan (Ronit's father) reveals the truth about him. Surjasekhar disguises himself as Arjo and enters the mansion. At the evening, they take the family as hostage. Deepjoy, on the other hand, rescues Arjo, but suddenly is shot by Bari Amma and Deepjoy also shoots her in return. Then he drops Arjo to his house. But suddenly an explosion kills the family trapped inside the ablazed room and at the next instant, Surjasekhar shoots Charu. Meanwhile, Arjo reaches the spot and tries to rescue Charu, but is shot by Mishmi, as he attempts to shoot Surjasekhar. Dejected by seeing Arjo and Charu's corpse laid beside each other, a heartbroken Mollika curses Surjasekhar and tells him that Charu and Arjo will return again and they will severely punish them for their crimes.

=== 25 years later ===
Mollika and Sohini are the only survivors of the war waged by Surjasekhar and Mishmi, where Arjo, Charu and the rest of the family met a tragic death. Mollika spent her all of the time at a temple praying for Arjo and Charu's reincarnation in order to punish Surjasekhar, and at last, her wishes came true. Charu is reborn as Chitrangada Dostidaar aka Chiku, daughter of a famous NRI businessman Niloy Dostidaar, whereas Arjo is reborn as Arjun, a mechanic.

Mishmi plans to sell the Mullick's mansion to Niloy thus defying Surjasekhar. Also Mollika observes Arjun at a temple and assumes him to be Arjo. Sohini tries to convince her that Arjo is no more, but Mollika refuses to believe it. Mishmi receives a cheque of INR 30 lakhs, but Amrita's spirit tears it off. Also Chiku brings her car to Arjun's garage and the two engage in a fight with each other. Chiku enters the Mullick mansion, but is shocked when Amrita's spirit calls her by the name Charu. At midnight, Amrita's spirit decorates the house since she is elated by Charu's return.

Chiku decides to avenge Arjun for his behaviour towards her, and thus, she ends up being the client for his vintage car. Initially Arjun refuses her job, but later when his family faces shortage of money, he accepts it. Also, Chiku shares a sweet relationship with Arjun's family from the first day she arrived at Arjun's house. But her father and aunt object to this, as his family belongs to a lower-middle-class family. Meanwhile, Chiku starts having an interest for Arjun, but Arjun decides to avoid her, since she belongs to a higher class. One day, her father finalises her wedding with Garry, an NRI boy, who was her aunt's brother's son. Chiku rejects Garry, as he is foolish, ugly and overspoken, and recommends an honest man as her husband. But her cunning aunt, Kaushambhi schemes to bring Garry and Chiku closer. She lies to Arjun and invites her for dinner, while she herself goes out along with family and Garry for dinner, leaving Chiku alone. Then she frames Chiku for having an affair with Arjun and as a result, Niloy, hastily arranges Chiku's marriage with Garry. But with the help of Amrita's spirit, she escapes from the house and arrives at Arjun's garage.

At garage, Chiku requests Arjun to marry her and fake their marriage in order to save herself from her forced marriage with Garry. Initially Arjun refuses, but after she threatens to end her life, he agrees. Also, it was the night when Charu and Arjo were married, and to her surprise, Mollika meets Arjun and Chitrangada for the first time at the temple. Chiku and Arjun ties the knot and they get married, which angers Niloy and he disowns Chiku at that instant. Arjun tries to console a dejected Chiku, but she replies that her father will never return. Chiku receives a warm welcome from Arjun's family, as she enters his house. On the other hand, an enraged Niloy decides to cut Chiku's ties with rest of the family. Kaushambhi takes advantage of this and plans a conspiracy against him.

Chiku takes a stand for Arjun when the neighbours insult him for marrying a rich girl. Prajukta, Poulomi, and Leo goes out to meet Chiku but Niloy, Kaushambhi and Garry catches them and forcefully takes them to their house whereas Chiku tries to meet them but failed. Kaushambhi gets to know Niloy's hidden feelings from him but Kaushambhi tries to instigate him against Chicku, Arjun and rest of the Roy family. One day, Arjun's father invites the Dostidars to attend Chiku's and Arjun's reception but instead Niloy insults them and asks them to leave the house. On the other hand, Chiku warns Arjun about Niloy not accepting him as his son-in-law. Slowly, Chicku realises that she has started falling in love with Arjun before leaving his house in order to return to the Dostidars.

After a couple of days, the police visits the Roys and arrests Kaustab because of Niloy falsely charging him for the money which was stolen from his bank account. Chiku and Arjun decides to save Kaustab by proving him innocent. After all the circumstances, Nupur and her mother blames Chiku. Meanwhile, Prajukta visits the Roys. But after all the insults, Chiku leaves the house along with her mother, leaving Arjun and rest of the Roy family heartbroken. After coming back to her house, Chiku realises that it was Kaushambhi and Garry's plan to conspire against Kaustab. She decides to punish them by exposing their deeds to the rest of the family. One day, after proving Kaustab innocent and after his marriage, Chiku gets a shock seeing her and Arjun's old photographs together in other attire. She decides to confront Mollika about the same. Mollika and Sohini reveals her story and also about Surjasekhar and Mishmi's evil deeds. Hearing all these, the duo decides to help them get justice. They shelter them into her house, recovers the property papers and returns it to them. Also during Durga Puja, the couple stages a drama in order to prove Surjasekhar and Mishmi guilty. But Arjo and Charu's spirit appears in front of them and kills them. Overwhelmed by Chiku and Arjun's loyalty and honesty, Mallika renames her property in Arjun and Chiku's name. And also requests them to donate the Mullick mansion to Charu's blind school.

=== 5 years later ===
Arjun, Chiku and the family moves to a new house. But Garry and Kaushambhi execute her evil plan and effect Chiku's arrest on the charge of stealing money. Also they try to kill Niloy, but Chiku escapes the police and saves him. A remorseful Niloy proves Garry guilty for his fraud case, and also apologizes to Arjun and his family for his evil deeds. Garry escapes the country upon Kaushambhi's instruction. Then suddenly Yuvraj Mukherjee, another friend of Chiku, returns to India and meets Chiku in order to end her relationship with Arjun, upon Kaushambhi's plan. Also Yuvi had sheltered Chiku's estranged sister, Aradhya, into his house. Chiku meets Aradhya, who was suffering from cancer, and her son, Gogol, and she learns of her story, that her lover left her, since her father disowns her, since he was poor. Chiku also discovers that Kaustab is her lover and that Yuvi had been posing as Gogol's father. Upon learning about Aradhya's illness, Chiku decides to get her custody, but Yuvi tactfully makes her his wife and Gogol's real mother. Also Kaushambhi poisons Arjun's mind against Chiku.

On Chiku and Arjun's marriage day, Arjun gets the biggest shock by learning that Chiku is Gogol's mother and Yuvi is her husband. Angered, he decides to break the marriage. Also on the other hand, Chiku, who was disturbed by Aradhya's death (although she was alive as per Kaushambhi's plan), decides to call off the wedding. Upon returning home, Arjun accuses her of cheating him and his family, which angers Chiku and she confesses all her lies. She also decides to break the marriage and leave the house, and also promises to wait for him until he realizes his mistake. The story ends with Arjun and Chiku getting emotional after getting separated from each other.

== Cast ==
=== Main ===
- Debchandrima Singha Roy as
  - Charu Ghosh Mallick/Anushree Choudhary – Shenuli and Bhanu's daughter; Jhumpa's step-daughter; Chumki's stepsister; Arjo's wife; Deepjoy's estranged husband; Bhoomi's mother (2019–2021)
  - Chitrangada "Chiku" Dostidaar Roy – Reborn Charu; A rich photographer; Niloy and Prajukta's younger daughter; Aradhya's sister; Poulomi and Leo's cousin; Arjun's wife (2021)
- Rezwan Rabbani Sheikh as
  - Arjoman "Arjo" Mallick – A blind businessman and photographer; Mallika and Arun's second son; Deepjoy, Angshu and Mouli's brother; Ronit and Bony's cousin; Charu's husband; Bhoomi's father (2019–2021)
  - Arjun Roy – Reborn Arjo; A mechanic and automobile engineer; Sunanda and Biplab's younger son; Labanya and Kaustab's brother; Tupur's cousin; Chiku's husband (2021)

=== Recurring ===
- Soumodip Singha Roy as Angshuman "Angshu" Mallick – Mallika and Arun's youngest son; Deepjoy, Arjo and Mouli's brother; Ronit and Bony's cousin brother; Chumki's ex-husband; Amrita's husband; Chini's father (2019–2021)
- Ritisha Ganguly / Piyali Sasmal as Amrita Banerjee Mallick – Dr. Banerjee's sister; Angshu's wife; Chini's mother (2019–2021)
- Dipanwita Rakshit as Chumki Ghosh Mukherjee – Jhumpa and Madan's daughter; Bhanu's step-daughter; Charu's step-sister; Angshu's ex-wife; Anubhav's wife (2019–2021)
- Rahul Dev Bose as Anubhav Mukherjee – A bank manager; Chumki's second husband (2021)
- Kanchana Moitra as Jhumpa Ghosh – Madan's ex-wife; Bhanu's wife; Chumki's mother; Charu's step-mother (2019–2021)
- Ratan Sarkhel as Bhanu Ghosh – Shenuli's widower; Jhumpa's husband; Charu's father; Chumki's step-father (2019–2020)
- Minakshi Ghosh as Sheuli Ghosh – Bhanu's first wife; Charu's mother (2021)
- Shaktipada Dey as Madan – Jhumpa's ex-husband; Chumki's father (2020)
- June Malia as Mallika Mallick – Arun's wife; Deepjoy, Arjo, Angshu and Mouli's mother; Bhoomi and Chini's grandmother; Srimon's adoptive grandmother (2019–2021)
- Anirban Guha as Arun Mallick – Anuradha and Daduvai's elder son; Sohini and Binoy's brother; Mallika's husband; Deepjoy, Arjo, Angshu and Mouli's father; Bhoomi and Chini's grandfather; Srimon's adoptive grandfather (2019–2020)
- Priyanka Chakraborty as Mouli Mallick – Mallika and Arun's daughter; Deepjoy, Arjo and Angshu's sister; Ronit and Bony's cousin (2019–2020)
- Indrajit Mazumdar as Deepjoy Mallick – Former terrorist / businessman; Mallika and Arun's lost eldest son; Arjo, Angshu and Mouli's brother (2021)
- Sawan Dey as Bani Mallick – Binoy's wife; Bony's mother (2019–2021)
- Avijit Sengupta as Binoy Mallick – Anuradha and Daduvai's younger son; Arun and Sohini's brother; Bani's husband; Bony's father (2019–2021)
- Swarnava Sanyal as Bony Mallick – Bani and Binoy's son; Deepjoy, Arjo, Angshu, Mouli and Ronit's cousin (2019–2020)
- Anuradha Roy as Anuradha Mallik – Daduvai's wife; Arun, Sohini and Binoy's mother; Deepjoy, Arjo, Angshu, Mouli, Ronit and Bony's grandmother (2019–2021)
- Unknown as Daduvai – Anuradha's husband; Arun, Sohini and Binoy's father; Deepjoy, Arjo, Angshu, Mouli, Ronit and Bony's grandfather (2019–2020)
- Sohini Sanyal as Sohini Mallick Sengupta – Anuradha and Daduvai's daughter; Arun and Binoy's sister; Shramik's wife; Ronit's mother; Srimon's grandmother (2019–2021)
- Anindya Banerjee as Ronit Sengupta – Sohini and Shramik's son; Deepjoy, Arjo, Angshu, Mouli and Bony's cousin; Mishmee's husband; Srimon's father (2020–2021)
- Priya Mondal as Mishmee Das Sengupta – Surjoshekar and Tanuja's daughter; Mohit's sister; Arjo's fake wife; Ronit's wife; Srimon's mother; Arjo's murderer (2020–2021)
- Priyantika Karmakar as Bhoomi Mallick – Charu and Arjo's daughter; Srimon's cousin; Ayush's love interest (2021)
- Shirsha Guha Thakurta as Srimon Sengupta – Ronit and Mishmi's daughter; Bhoomi's cousin; Ayush's former love interest (2021)
- Debraj Mukherjee as Surjoshekhar Das – A terrorist; Tanuja's husband; Mishmee and Mohit's father; Srimon's grandfather; Charu's murderer (2020–2021)
- Poushmita Goswami as Tanuja Das – Surjoshekar's wife; Mishmi and Mohit's mother; Srimon's grandmother (2020)
- Priyam as Mohit Das – Surjoshekhar and Tanuja's son; Mishmi's brother (2021)
- Gora Dhar as Mr. Kundu – Mallick's sweets manager (2019–2020)
- Nilankur Mukhopadhyay as Dr. Banerjee – Amrita's brother (2020)
- Sreetama Roy Chowdhury as Raima – Charu's competitor and friend in Asian food competition (2020)
- Sayantani Sengupta as Ayesha aka Bari Amma – Leader of the terrorist group (2021)
- Omkar Bhattacharyya as Ayush – Bhoomi and Srimon's instructor; Bhoomi's love interest (2021)
- Himanshu De as Alok – An investigation officer; Arjo's boss who appointed him as captain Azad (2021)
- Kaushik Chakraborty as Niloy Dostidaar – A famous NRI businessman; Bonolata's elder son; Proloy's brother; Prajukta's husband; Aradhya and Chiku's father; Gogol's grandfather (2021)
- Sanjuktaa Roy Chowdhury as Prajukta Dostidaar – Niloy's wife; Aradhya and Chiku's mother; Gogol's grandmother (2021)
- Sanghita Ghosh as Aradhya Dostidar – Niloy and Prajukta's lost elder daughter; Chiku's sister; Poulomi and Leo's cousin; Kaustab's former lover; Gogol's mother (2021)
- Samir Biswas as Mr. Dostidaar – Bonolata's husband; Niloy and Proloy's father; Aradhya, Chiku, Poulomi and Leo's grandfather (2021)
- Tanima Sen as Bonolata Dostidaar – Niloy and Proloy's mother; Aradhya, Chiku, Poulomi and Leo's grandmother (2021)
- Rii Sen as Kaushambhi Dostidaar – Proloy's wife; Poulomi and Leo's mother (2021)
- Ashmita Chakraborty as Poulomi Dostidaar – Proloy and Kaushambhi's daughter; Leo's sister; Aradhya and Chiku's cousin (2021)
- Vicky Nandy as Diesel – A mechanic; Arjun's friend and assistant (2021)
- Debdut Ghosh as Biplab Roy – Uttam's brother; Sunanda's husband; Labanya, Kaustab and Arjun's father; Gogol's grandfather (2021)
- Jayati Chakraborty as Sunanda Roy – Biplab's wife; Labanya, Kaustab and Arjun's mother; Gogol's grandmother (2021)
- Kheyali Ghosh Dostidar as Mrs. Roy – Biplab and Uttam's mother; Labanya, Kaustab, Arjun and Tupur's grandmother (2021)
- Anindya Banerjee as Uttam Roy – Biplab's brother; Shampa's husband; Tupur's father (2021)
- Ivana Dutta as Shampa Roy – Uttam's wife; Tupur's mother (2021)
- Sreejita Biswas as Tupur Roy – Uttam and Shampa's daughter; Labanya, Kaustab and Arjun's cousin (2021)
- Dwaipayan Das as Kaustab Roy – A bank manager; Biplab and Sunanda's elder son; Labanya and Arjun's brother; Aradhya's former lover; Nupur's husband; Gogol's father (2021)
- Jagriti Goswami Ghatak as Nupur Roy – Jhinuk's sister; Kaustab's wife (2021)
- Payel Dutta as Labanya Roy – Biplab and Sunanda's daughter; Kaustab and Arjun's sister (2021)
- Rupsha Mondal / Samata Chatterjee Lahiri as Jhinuk – Nupur's sister (2021)
- Poonam Basak as Jhimli – Chiku's house maid (2021)
- Sayak Chakraborty as Gaur aka Garry – Chiku's ex-fiancée; Kaushambhi's nephew (2021)
- Biswabasu Biswas as Yuvraj Mukherjee – Chiku's former friend (2021)

=== Guest appearance ===
- Monami Ghosh as Iraboti/ Anushree (cameo appearance from Irabotir Chupkotha)
- Syed Arefin as Akash Chatterjee (cameo appearance from Irabotir Chupkotha)
- Gourav Ghosal as a competitor in Asian Food Competition
- Indrajeet Bose as himself, a celebrity to promote the poush-parbon mela
- Usha Uthup
- Nachiketa Chakraborty
- Rupankar Bagchi
- Singer Jojo

== Reception ==
=== Ratings ===
Week	Year	BARC Viewership		Ref.
Week	Year	TRP	Rank	Ref.
Week 37	2020	6.4	2	
Week 38	2020	6.4	1	
Week 39	2020	6.5	2	
Week 40	2020	6.4	2	
Week 42	2020	5.4	2	
Week 43	2020	5.1	2	
Week 44	2020	5.5	2	
Week 45	2020	5.9	2	
Week 46	2020	5.4	2	
Week 47	2020	5.9	3	
Week 48	2020	5.8	2	
Week 50	2020	4.8	4	
Week 4	2021	4.9	5	
Week 5	2021	4.8	5	
Week 7	2021	4.5	4	

== Adaptations ==
Language	Title	Premiere date	Network(s)	Last aired	Notes
Hindi	Aapki Nazron Ne Samjha आपकी नज़रो ने समझा	2 March 2021	StarPlus	9 October 2021	Remake
Tamil	Raja Paarvai ராஜ பார்வை	22 March 2021	Star Vijay	18 December 2021	Remake
Kannada	Akashadeepa ಆಕಾಶದೀಪ	21 June 2021	Star Suvarna	30 January 2022	Remake
Telugu	Krishnamma Kalipindhi Iddarini కృష్ణమ్మ కలిపింది ఇద్దరినీ	9 May 2023	Star Maa	23 September 2023	Remake
