= Milon Tithi =

Indian television series

- Poster starring Ushashi Ray and Debjani Chakraborty
- Genre: Indian soap opera Romance; Revenge drama
- Created by: Acropoliis Entertainment Pvt. Ltd.
- Developed by: Aratrika; Sromona Ghose; (Star Jalsha)
- Screenplay by: Hrishita Bhattacharya; Dialogues; Sayan Chowdhury
- Directed by: Babu Banik; Amal Kumar Banik
- Starring: Riju Biswas; Ushasi Ray; Jeetu Kamal; Debjani Chakraborty
- Voices of: Shadaab Hashmi; Madhuraa Bhattacharya
- Theme music composer: Indradip Paul (Baban)
- Opening theme: "Milon Tithi"
- Country of origin: India
- Original language: Bengali
- No. of seasons: 1
- No. of episodes: 587

Production
- Executive producer: Sromona Ghose
- Producers: Snigdha Basu; Sani Ghose Ray
- Production location: Kolkata
- Running time: 22 minutes
- Production company: Acropoliis Entertainment Pvt. Ltd.

Original release
- Network: Star Jalsha
- Release: 23 November 2015 – 20 August 2017

Related
- Thik Jeno Love Story; Pratidaan

Milon Tithi (Bengali: মিলন তিথি) is an Indian Bengali language television soap that premiered on 23 November 2015 on Star Jalsha. The story primarily revolves around Aditya, Arjun, Ahona and Bonhi. It was produced by Acropoliis Entertainment Pvt. Ltd. and starred Riju Biswas, Ushasi Ray, Jeetu Kamal, Debjani Chakraborty and Ishaan Majumder in the lead roles. The show was replaced by Pratidaan.

== Plot summary ==
Milon Tithi revolves around a male and two female characters: Arjun, Ahona and Bonhi. Arjun is a rich, young man who liked Bonhi, yet married Ahona. Ahona is the daughter of a house owner and Bonhi is the daughter of a maid servant. Arjun always kept Bonhi happy, even with all her greedy needs. Ahona sees Bonhi as her best friend, but Bonhi dislikes Ahona and uses Arjun and separates him from Ahona. The story ends with Arjun and Ahona's separation.

=== Three-year leap ===
After three years everyone thinks Ahona is dead and that Bonhi killed Ahona's parents. Ahona vows revenge on Bonhi. Ahona has a son named Chiku, but he's actually Bonhi's son. A new man enters Ahona's life named Aditya. Aditya loves Ahona, yet Arjun still loves Ahona. He draws Ahona a painting every day. Bonhi has now become the owner of Mallick's villa. She is making the Mallick villa a living hell. Ahona (a.k.a. Meera) buys the Mallick villa and returns the property papers to her father. Later, Bonhi and Mrinal get arrested and Bonhi and Mrinal confess all their crimes. Bonhi gets out of jail but Mrinal is sentenced to jail for seven years.

=== Three-month leap ===
After a few days, Ahona and Aditya marry and Bonhi's father appears. Ahona reunited Bonhi's father and mother. Later after many twists Bohni and Arjun get married forcibly by Ahona. There was a big conspiracy against Ahona and Aditya. The conspiracy is plotted by none other than Arjun. Later Arjun kidnaps Aditya on the day of his and Ahona's wedding but Bonhi gets to know that Arjun is the one who kidnapped Aditya. Later Ahona rescues Aditya from Arjun. Then Bonhi tells Ahona Arjun is behind all the kidnapping and everything else. Then, Ahona Aditya and Arjun Bonhi goes for honeymoon. There is a big conspiracy to kill Aditya plotted by Arjun. Ahona saves Aditya many times from Arjun. Later she gets to know everything is being plotted by Arjun. Later Bonhi in Ahona's avatar pushes Arjun from a cliff. But Arjun thinks it was Bonhi. She took Ahona's avatar so Ahona receives the entire blame.

=== One-year leap ===
Later Ahona aka Bonhi pushes Arjun over a cliff. But everyone thinks Ahona was the one who pushed Arjun from the cliff. Leaving everyone to think that Arjun had died one year ago. One year later, Chiku is four years old. Arjun comes back and pretends to be Jishnu who got lost many years ago by falling from a cliff. Arjun goes to Malick's house to take revenge on Ahona as Jishnu. Later it was revealed that it was not Ahona who pushed Arjun from a cliff actually it was Bonhi. She was the one who pushed Arjun from the cliff, in order to obtain all the property of Arjun. Later she joins hands with Jishnu (a.k.a. Arjun) to ruin Aditya and Ahona's life. Later Mrinal comes back to seek revenge from Ahona. Bonhi calls Ahona and fakes that Rahul has kidnapped her and tells Ahona to come to a temple to rescue her. It turns out to be a fake kidnapping to trap Ahona in their evil plans. They will try to kill Ahona. Bonhi's true colors are revealed and she and Arjun are jailed for few months.

=== Six months leap ===
Everything is normal in the Mallick house. Bonhi writes a letter to Ahona that she will never come back in her life to trouble her. The show ends on a happy note on Chiku's sixth birthday.

== Cast ==
=== Main ===
- Riju Biswas as Aditya Bhaduri - Ahona's love interest turned husband. Chiku's adoptive father. (2017)
- Ushashi Ray as Ahona Bhaduri (formerly Mullick) aka Meera - Sudhir's daughter, Bonhi's childhood friend, Arjun's ex-wife, Aditya's love interest turned wife. Chiku's adoptive mother. (2015–2017)
- Jeetu Kamal (before surgery) / Ishaan Majumdar (after surgery) as Arjun Mullick - Rudra's youngest son, Ahana's ex-husband, Bonhi's love interest turned husband. Chiku's biological father .(2015-2017)
- Debjani Chakraborty as Bonhi Mullick (née Chowdhury) - Arjun's love-interest turned wife, Ahana's childhood friend and rival. Chiku's biological mother.(2015-2017)

=== Recurring ===
- Rajat Ganguly as Rudra Shekhar Mallick - Arjun's father (2015–2017)
- Swagata Basu as Debika Mallick - Arjun's mother (2015–2017)
- Chitra Sen as Rudra Sekhar's mother, Arjun's paternal grandmother (2016)
- Indraneil Mallick as Riju Mallick - Aakash, Arjun and Ginia's younger brother, Doyel's husband (2015–2017)
- Alivia Sarkar as Doyel Mullick (née Bhaduri) - Aditya's sister, Riju's wife (2017)
- Aman Mehra as Abimanyu "Chiku” Mallick, Bonhi and Arjun's biological son, Ahona and Aditya's adoptive son. (2017)
- Pinky Mallick as Sathi, Bonhi's mother (2015–2017)
- Suchismita Chowdhury as Aditya's mother (2017)
- Anirban Guha as late Sudhir Bose, Ahona's father (2015–2016)
- Abanti Dutta as late Mita Bose, Ahona's mother (2015–2016)
- Suvajit Kar as Deb (2016–2017)
- Abhijit Debroy as Saikat Bose (2015–2017)
- Mallika Majumdar as Shibani Mallick (2015–2017)
- Subhrajit Dutta as Aakash Mallick - Arjun, Riju and Ginia's elder brother (2015–2017)
- Sayantani Sengupta as Keya Mallick (2015–2017)
- Pritha Chatterjee / Uma Bardhan as late Sohini Mallick (2015–2017)
- Samata Chatterjee Lahiri as Jhilik (2015–2017)
- Shankar Debnath as Sohini's husband, Rudra Sekhar's younger brother (2015–2017)
- Madhurima Basak / Sanchari Mondal as Ginia, Aakash, Arjun and Riju's sister - Mrinal's wife (2015–2017)
- Biresh Chakraborty as Mrinal - Bonhi's ex-fianceé, Ginia's love-interest turned husband (2016–2017)
- Raj Bhattacharya (2016–2017)
- Runa Bandyapadhyay (2016–2017)
- Arindam Banerjee as Anirban - Bonhi's biological father (2016–2017)

== Adaptations ==
Language	Title	Original release	Network(s)	Last aired	Notes
Hindi	Imlie Second Generation	19 September 2022	StarPlus	10 September 2023	Remake
