= Tumii Je Amar Maa =

Indian Bengali television series

- Genre: Romance; Drama; Family
- Starring: Priya Mondal; Suman Dey
- Opening theme: Tumii Je Aamar Maa
- Country of origin: India
- Original language: Bengali
- No. of seasons: 1
- No. of episodes: 607

Production
- Executive producer: Shreya Bose
- Producers: Snigdha Basu; Sani Ghose Ray
- Camera setup: Multi-camera
- Running time: 21 min approx
- Production company: Acropoliis Entertainment

Original release
- Network: Colors Bangla
- Release: 6 June 2022 – 4 February 2024

Tumii Je Amar Maa is an Indian Bengali drama television series which premiered on 6 June 2022 on Colors Bangla and digital platform Voot. The series is produced by Snigdha Basu and Sani Ghose Ray under the banner of Acropoliis Entertainment. It stars Priya Mondal, Suman Dey and Aradhaya Biswas (Oindrila Saha).

== Plot ==
The show revolves around a single father Aniruddha Roy Chowdhury, a simple girl Arohi and Aniruddha's daughter Arohi 'Aru' Chowdhury.

Aru desperately searches for her mother. Later, Aru wished that Arohi become her mother but Aniruddha doesn't want to remarry. Aru is kidnapped, but Arohi saves her while Aniruddha starts a police investigation to find Aru and mistakenly believes that Arohi kidnapped his daughter, so Arohi is arrested.

Later, Arohi is soon to marry Manik but with the help of Aniruddha, Aru kidnaps her to prevent the wedding. Shibani asks Arohi to work in her house, to befriend little Aru but Arohi feels that it's a governess job. Later, she accepts the job.

== Cast ==
=== Main ===
- Suman Dey as Aniruddha Roy Chowdhury – Aarohi and Aaraddha's father and Riddhima's husband (2022–2024)
- Priya Mondal as Aarohi Chakraborty alias Tiyash Banerjee (memory loss) – Aru's foster mother, Aaraddha's mother (2022–2024)
- Oindrila Saha as Aarohi Roy Chowdhury aka Aru – Aniruddha and Riddhima's daughter (2023–2024)
  - Aradhya Biswas as Young Aarohi 'Aru' Roy Chowdhury – Aniruddha and Riddhima's daughter

=== Recurring ===
- Mallika Majumder as Shibani Roy Chowdhury – Aniruddha's aunt, Aru's grandmother
- Pritha Chatterjee as Srabanti Roy Chowdhury – Aniruddha's aunt, Aru's second grandmother
- Subhrajit Dutta as Bhaskar Roy Chowdhury – Aniruddha's uncle, Aru's Grandfather
- Sunanda Chakraborty / Shirsha Guhathakurata as Riyanka Roy Chowdhury aka Riya – Srabanti and Bhaskar's daughter
- Ayush Adhikari as Tuban Chakraborty – Arohi’s brother, Aru’s Uncle, Mitali’s Son
- Suchismita Chowdhury as Bidisha Roy Chowdhury – Aniruddha's Stepmother, Aru's grandmother
- Suban Roy as Manik
- Roshni Tanwi Bhattacharya as Riddhima Roy Chowdhury – Aru's biological mother and Aniruddha's long-lost wife (2022–2023)
- Rahul Dev Bose as Mallar Banerjee - a doctor and Tiyash's husband (Aarohi), Aaraddha's foster father
- Rajashree Bhowmik as Mrs. Banerjee – Mallar's mother, Tiyash's mother-in-law, Aaraddha's foster paternal grandmother
