= Phirki =

- Genre: Drama
- Written by: Ashita Bhattacharya; Jyoti Hazra; Souvik
- Directed by: Soumen Halder
- Starring: Aarja Banarjee; Sampriti Poddar; Shayan Mukherjee
- Composer: Suvam Moitra
- Country of origin: India
- Original language: Bengali
- No. of episodes: 225

Production
- Producers: Snigdha Basu; Sani Ghose Ray
- Camera setup: Multi-camera
- Running time: 22 minutes
- Production company: Acropoliis Entertainment

Original release
- Network: Zee Bangla
- Release: 3 February 2020 – 2 January 2021

Phirki is an Indian Bengali television soap opera that premiered on 3 February 2020 on Bengali General entertainment Channel Zee Bangla and was also available on the digital platform Zee5. The show stars Aarja Banerjee, Sampriti Poddar and Shayan Mukherjee. The show is produced by Acropoliis Entertainment. The show went off air on 31 December 2021.

== Summary ==
Phirki, a little girl was rescued by Lakshmi, a Hijra. And brought up by her. The story revolves around the lives of Lakshmi and Phirki who happen to share a mother-daughter bond.

== Plot ==
The story, begins with Lakshmi, rescuing a newborn baby girl from angry villagers who threatens to kill her. The girl was left at a boat by a village woman named Sudipa, who was her mother. Lakshmi rescues her and adopts her and names her Phirki. Although she faces difficulties, yet she is able to fulfil her needs and raise her. One day, Phirki meets with a boy named Niladri, and he instantly befriends her. Niladri was the son of Bhaskar Sinha Roy, an influential politician. He takes Phirki to his home and introduces her as his friend. Niladri's mother Nandini instantly bonds with Phirki, since her first child was a intersex. Also his sister Madhuja befriends Phirki. The only ones who hated Phirki are Niladri's grandmother Sunanda, Niladri's aunt Ronjini, Niladri's maternal aunt Roma and Niladri's uncle Rudro, who is also a drug dealer.

Niladri and Phirki develops a strong friendship with each other, which makes her girlfriend Aliya jealous of her. One day, at Ronjini's baby shower ceremony, Aliya's step-mother Sudipa meets Phirki, unknown that she is her daughter. Sudipa is the wife of industrialist Moloy Roy, Aliya's father, who was also a close friend of Bhaskar. After few days, Niladri was sent by his father to study abroad, but he promised Phirki to return, after he grew up.

12 years later

Phirki becomes a successful lawyer under the guidance of her mother Lokkhi, while Niladri returns to India and meets Phirki. Also, Sunanda and Roma plan to separate Phirki from Niladri. One day, Niladri proposes to Phirki for marriage, but she refuses, saying that his parents might not accept it. Also, Bhaskar announces Niladri's marriage with Aliya. On tha day of Niladri's engagement, he goes to save Phirki from her forced marriage, and in the process, he marries her accidentally. Bhaskar reluctantly accepts Phirki, but he proposes a condition, that Phirki will never meet Lokkhi. Also Aliya gets angry upon seeing Phirki married to Niladri, and thus, she join hands with Sunanda, Ronjini and Roma to ruin Phirki and Niladri's relationship. Also, Nandini and Madhuja bonds with Phirki.

One day, Aliya attempts to suicide and Phirki and Niladri saves her and brings her home, as per her plan to ruin Phirki's image. She plans to make Phirki drink alcohol on Bhaskar's birthday, arranged by Phirki, to ruin her image. But to her surprise, Ronjini drinks alcohol and starts misbehaving with Phirki and Lokkhi. Bhaskar starts realising his mistake and thus, decides to throw Ronjini out of house.

On the other hand, Sudipa is shocked to meet Lokkhi, since she was the one who rescued her daughter on that day. But Moloy prevents her and accuses her of meeting his daughter's enemies. Sudipa tries to convince Moloy that Phirki is her daughter, but he refuses to believe. Meanwhile, Rudro starts hiding drugs inside Lokkhi's house. One day, at Dusshera, Rudro gets murdered by Vicky, another drug dealer, who was also Madhuja's stalker. Also on the other hand, Ronjini tries to kill Phirki, but realises her mistake after she rescues her son, and applogises to her. Lokkhi arrives at the drug factory to find Rudro lying dead. But however, the police suspects her of murdering him and drug dealing and thus arrests her. Bhaskar, agitated at Lokkhi's act, decides to sentence Lokkhi to death, but Phirki and Niladri tries to prove her innocence, but Bhaskar tries to prevent them from doing so.

Sudipa meets Lokkhi in the jail, and she reveals that she is Phirki's real mother. She narrates her story, that Phirki is her and Suman's (Sudipa's first husband) daughter. But one day, Moloy conspired to separate them, as he had an interest on her. Also he instigated the villagers to kill baby Phirki. And later, he blackmailed her to marry him, in order to save her ailing father. Also, on the other hand, Phirki finds an anklet of Rosy and suspects her of murder, but it fails. However, one day at court, Muskaan, another third gender and Bhaskar's first child, gives statement in favour of Lokkhi and thus, proves her innocence. Later, Lokkhi contests for elections and reveals that Rudro was the real drug dealer and Bhaskar knew it, which shocks Niladri and Phirki. At a picnic, Phirki learns about her mother, and thus, reconciles with Sudipa, and assures that she will find her father. Bhaskar, decides to reform his ways, and decides to bring her first child Muskaan, back. But however, the show ends with Muskaan killing Bhaskar, at the end.

== Cast ==
=== Main ===
- Sampriti Poddar as Phirki Sinha Roy, Niladri's love-interest and wife, Lakshmi's adoptive daughter and Sudipa's daughter.
  - Adrija Mukherjee as Teenage Phirki
    - Mahi Singh as Child Phirki
- Shayan Mukherjee as Niladri Sinha Roy, Phirki's love-interest and husband, Bhaskar and Nandini's son
  - Aishik Mukherjee as Child Niladri
- Aarja Banerjee as Lakshmi- Phirki's adoptive mother, a transgender

=== Recurring ===
- Suzi Bhowmik as Rani, Lakhsmi's friend
- Kusum Samanta as Parvati/Pati Masi, Lakhsmi's friend
- Kaushik Chakraborty as Bhaskar Sinha Roy: a minister, Nandini's husband, Niladdri and Madhuja's father and Phirki's father-in-law
- Mallika Majumdar as Nandini Sinha Roy: Bhaskar's wife, Niladdri and Madhuja's mother and Phirki's mother-in-law
- Saswati Guha Thakurta / Tanima Sen as Sunanda Sinha Roy, Bhaskar's mother and Niladdri's grandmother
- Sohini Sanyal as Ranjini- Bhaskar's sister and Niladdri and Madhuja's aunt
- Shaon Dey as Roma Chatterjee, Nandini's sister and political supporter of Bhaskar
- Sanghita Ghosh as Madhuja Sinha Roy, Bhaskar and Nandini's daughter and Niladdri's sister
- Shakshi Roy as Bidisha Sinha Roy, Bhaskar's sister and Niladdri and Madhuja's aunt
- Titas Sanyal / Sayantany Chatterjee as Aliya Sengupta, Moloy's daughter, Sudipa's step-daughter and Niladri's one-sided lover
  - Preksha Saha as Child Aliya
- Subhrajit Dutta as Rudro Sinha Roy: Bhaskar's brother and Tworita's husband; a drug dealer.
- Ratri Ghatak as Rosy, Lakhsmi's enemy
- Suchandra Banerjee as Twarita Sinha Roy, Rudro's wife
- Minakshi Ghosh as Sudipa Sengupta, Moloy's second wife, Aliya's stepmother and Phirki's biological mother
- Judhajit Banerjee as Moloy Sengupta- a famous industrialist, Bhaskar's friend, Aliya's father and Sudipa's second husband
- Arindya Banerjee as Vicky Purkayastha
- Sudipa Basu as Minakshi Debi.
