= Pratidaan =

Indian television series

- Title Poster
- Genre: Soap opera
- Created by: Boyhood Productions
- Screenplay by: Sayantani Bhattacharya; Dialogues; Arpita Paul
- Story by: Star Jalsha Creative Team
- Directed by: Siddhartha Paul
- Starring: Sandipta Sen; Rezwan Rabbani Sheikh; Rukma Roy; Tanuka Chatterjee; Debraj Mukherjee
- Opening theme: "Pratidaan"
- Composer: Debjit Roy
- Country of origin: India
- Original language: Bengali
- No. of seasons: 4
- No. of episodes: 481

Production
- Producers: Surinder Singh; Gurjit Singh; Sushanta Das
- Production location: Kolkata
- Running time: 22 minutes
- Production company: Boyhood Productions

Original release
- Network: STAR Jalsha
- Release: 21 August 2017 – 23 December 2018

Related
- Milon Tithi; Pavitra Bandham

Pratidaan (Bengali: প্রতিদান) is a Bengali television soap opera that premiered on 21 August 2017 and aired on Star Jalsha. Produced by Boyhood Productions, it starred Sandipta Sen and Rezwan Rabbani Sheikh in lead roles. Rukma Roy and Debraj Mukherjee played negative roles. It replaced Star Jalsha's show Milon Tithi. The show went off air on 23 December 2018 and was replaced by Bhoomikanya.

== Plot ==
Shimul is a school teacher from a village with limited access to education. She is committed to teaching and promoting education within her community. After her marriage, she becomes part of a family in which education is given less importance than in her own upbringing and career.

Neel is a happening college-goer but hates studies to such an extent that he passed his graduation exams only after appearing for it the 4th time. Neel is also extremely spoilt and is guided by his mother, who herself believes that studies are a waste of time. Neel's mother wants her daughter-in-law to be illiterate as she doesn't want anyone in the family to be more qualified than her son. Shimul brings changes in Neel for the better, and the two go about life hand-in-hand, overcoming hurdles that life throws at them. Off late, Neel succumbs to a life laced with tragedy and alcohol after the sad demise of Shimul. Sunaina, a con and a bar-crooner makes an entry and is found to be Shimul's exact lookalike.

== Cast ==
=== Main ===
- Sandipta Sen as Shimul Bosu Sen aka "Shiuli Phool" / Mrs. Braginza or "Beguni Phool"/Sunaina (briefly disguised as)
  - Unknown as Young Shimul
- Rezwan Rabbani Sheikh as Neel Sen / Ronit/ Anghsuman / Fake Neel
  - Saptarshi Chowdhury as Young Neel
- Rukma Roy as Madhushree Chowdhury

=== Supporting ===
- Tanuka Chatterjee as Shantipriya Sen
- Surojit Banerjee as Ganapati Sen aka Chanachur Buro
- Sahana Sen as Mala
- Subrata Guha Roy as Neel's Uncle
- Ranjini Chatterjee as Madhabi
- Rimjhim Mitra as Jaya
- Boton as Jaya's Husband
- Nabanita Dutta as Pallabi
- Anindya Chakrabarti / Debraj Mukherjee as Ambikesh Nandy
- Priya Malakar as Nisha
- Bharat Kaul as Nisha's Father
- Chumki Choudhury as Kalyani
- Sudip Sarkar as Pranabesh
- Sanjay Basu as Bhaskar
- Purbasha Debnath as Shema
