= Mithu Chakrabarty =

Indian film and television actress

- Occupation: Actress
- Years active: 2005-present
- Spouse: Sabyasachi Chakrabarty (m.1986)
- Children: Gaurav Chakrabarty (b.1987); Arjun Chakrabarty (b.1990)
- Relatives: Ridhima Ghosh (daughter-in-law)

Mithu Chakrabarty is an Indian television actress and theater personality. She is the wife of veteran Bengali actor Sabyasachi Chakrabarty.

== Personal life ==
Mithu Chakrabarty is the wife of veteran Bengali actor Sabyasachi Chakraborty. They have two children, Gourab Chakrabarty and Arjun Chakrabarty.

It was reported in June 2024 that Mithu Chakrabarty had been diagnosed with breast cancer and was undergoing treatment.

== Filmography ==
- Joto Kando Kolkatatei (2025)
- Tenida and Co. (2023) as Shatkari Satra's wife
- Mrs. Chatterjee vs Norway (2023)
- Mini
- Bornoporichoy
- Anurup/Mirror Image
- Crisscross
- Maacher Jhol (2017 feature film)
- Pari-2018
- Bibaho Diaries
- M.S. Dhoni The Untold Story
- Rupkatha Noy as Prasit's mother
- Tor Naam
- Muktodhara
- Chaplin
- Ajob Prem Ebong
- Icche
- The Bong Connection
- Anuranan
- Ek Tukro Chand
- Ballygunge Court
- Dosar
- Ek je Achhe Kanya
- Box No. 1313
- Aamra
- Teen Ekke Teen
- Ami Aadu

== Television ==
Year	Serial	Channel	Notes
2005–2007	Ekdin Pratidin	Zee Bangla	
2008–2017	Chander Buri O Magic Man	Zee Bangla	Chander Buri voice
2009–2010	Ekhane Aakash Neel	Star Jalsha	
2010–2011	Gaaner Oparey	Star Jalsha	
2011–2012	Adwitiya	Star Jalsha	
2011–2012	Nayika	Sananda TV	
2012	Ghore Pherar Gaan	Star Jalsha	Later replaced by Namita Chakraborty
2013	Roshni	ETV Bangla	
2012–2014	Agnipariksha	Zee Bangla	
2013– 2017	Bodhuboron	Star Jalsha	
2018–2020	Irabotir Chupkotha	Star Jalsha	
2022–2024	Horogouri Pice Hotel	Star Jalsha	Later replaced by Tulika Basu

== Web series ==
Year	Series	OTT
2018	In Their Life	Addatimes
2018	The Big Bong Connection	SonyLIV
2019	Paap (Season 1)	Hoichoi
2021	Shei Je Holud Pakhi	Hoichoi
2021	Paap (Season 2)	Hoichoi
2022	Search	Klikk
2022	Uttoron	Hoichoi
2023	Indubala Bhaater Hotel	Hoichoi
