= Ogo Nirupoma =

Indian Bengali television period drama series

- Genre: Drama romance
- Created by: Acropoliis Entertainment
- Developed by: Acropoliis Entertainment
- Written by: Dialogues; Souvik Chakraborty
- Screenplay by: Rishita Bhattacharya
- Story by: Acropoliis Creative Team
- Directed by: Argha Paik
- Creative director: Prasen (Acropoliis)
- Starring: Arkoja Acharya; Gourab Roy Choudhury
- Theme music composer: Shantajit; Shubham
- Opening theme: "Ogo Nirupama....."
- Country of origin: India
- Original language: Bengali
- No. of episodes: 297+1(Special)

Production
- Executive producers: Arnab (Acropoliis); Shamajita, Shaptara & Dipanita (Star Jalsha)
- Producers: Snigdha Basu; Sani Ghose Ray
- Production location: Kolkata
- Cinematography: Sandip Das
- Editors: Nilanjan; Arunaditya
- Camera setup: Multi-camera
- Running time: 22 minutes
- Production company: Acropoliis Entertainment

Original release
- Network: Star Jalsha
- Release: 5 October 2020 – 1 August 2021

Ogo Nirupoma is an Indian Bengali language romantic drama television series which was premiered on 5 October 2020 on Bengali Entertainment Channel Star Jalsha and ended on 1 August 2021. It is also available on Disney+ Hotstar even before telecast. The show is produced by Acropoliis Entertainment and it stars Arkoja Acharya and Gourab Roy Choudhury in lead roles. It is the remake of Asianet's Malayalam show Kasthooriman

== Plot ==
The story follows Abir and Nirupama. Abir is a handsome and successful businessman and managing director of 'Mohini's Beauty World'- a renowned cosmetics company, whereas Nirupama is a bank employee who is not a good looking woman. The story focuses on the importance of one's character and quality, and not the superficial.

== Cast ==
=== Main ===
- Arkoja Acharya as Nirupama Roychowdhury (née Dutta) aka Rupu / Sanjukta Roychowdhury- an ugly looking woman who was kind-hearted, a former bank employee and a model (as Sanjukta), Abir's wife
- Gourab Roy Chowdhury as Abir Roychowdhury / Prithviraj- Nirupoma's husband; a businessman, M.D. of Mohini's Beauty World, a renowned cosmetics company, a singer. He was a man who judges a book by its cover (i.e. judges a woman by her looks, not by her heart).

=== Recurring ===
- Tulika Basu as Mohini Roychowdhury- Shalini's younger twin sister, Supratim's second wife, Abir's step mother, Mainak, Ena and Rishab mother; a former model; a greedy and corrupt businesswoman / Shalini Roychowdhury- Mohini's elder twin sister, Abir's biological mother, Supratim's first and estranged wife, a kind-hearted businesswoman who was her sister's opposite
- Arghya Mukherjee as Supratim Roychowdhury- Abir's father; a retired businessman; Shalini and Mohini's husband, Nayana's elder son.
- Anuradha Roy as Nayana Roychowdhury- Abir's grandmother; Supratim and Sudip's mother
- Mainak Dhol as Mainak Roychowdhury- Abir's youngest half-brother; Urmi's husband (as they reconciles at last); Kajal's fake husband
- Ujani Dasgupta as Prerona Roychowdhury- Rishab's wife; Kajal's elder sister
- Pritam Das as Rishav Roychowdhury- Abir's younger half-brother; Prerona's husband
- Prarona Bhattacharya as Sneha Roychowdhury- Abir's aunt, Sudip's wife
- Subhrajit Dutta as Sudip Roychowdhury- Abir's uncle, Sneha's husband, Nayana's younger son.
- Sneha Bose as Kajal- Abir's former girlfriend; Mainak's fake wife, Nirupoma's appointed model of Mohini's Beauty World.
- Priyanka Chakraborty as Ena Roychowdhury- Abir's half-sister; Harry's ex-girlfriend; Arup's wife.
- Tanuka Chatterjee as Bijaya Dutta- Nirupoma's mother
- Bikash Bhowmik as Nirmal Dutta- Nirupoma's father
- Soumi Ghosh as Urmimala Roychowdhury (née Dutta) / Urmi - a greedy girl; Nirupoma's sister; Abir's ex-fiancée; Mainak's wife
- Dipayan Mukherjee as Anuj- Nirupoma's brother
- Poushmita Goswami as Deepa- Nirupama's Aunt
- Sharbani Chatterjee as Bela - Mohini's cunning friend turned enemy
- Prosun Saha as Sishir- Abir's friend; Piya's love-interest
- Purbasha Debnath as Piya- Nirupoma's close friend and colleague; Shishir's love-interest
- Anujit Sarkar as Harry- Ena's boyfriend
- Manoj Ojha as Arup- Nirupoma's friend who likes her despite her looks; Ena's husband
- Moumita Chakraborty as Arup's mother

== Adaptations ==
Language	Title	Original release	Network(s)	Last aired	Notes
Malayalam	Kasthooriman കസ്തൂരിമാൻ	11 December 2017	Asianet	27 March 2021	Original
Marathi	Chhatriwali छत्रीवाली	18 June 2018	Star Pravah	21 September 2019	
Kannada	Bayasade Bali Bande ಬಯಸದೆ ಬಲಿ ಬಂದೆ	25 February 2019	Star Suvarna	10 April 2020	
Bengali	Ogo Nirupoma ওগো নিরুপমা	5 October 2020	Star Jalsha	1 August 2021	
