= Irabotir Chupkotha =

Indian television series

- Genre: Drama; Romance; Family
- Screenplay by: Hrishita Bhattacharya; Dialogues; Antara Banerjee
- Story by: Ashita Bhattacharya
- Directed by: Manojeet Majumder
- Creative director: Satyaki
- Starring: Monami Ghosh; Syed Arefin
- Voices of: Ujjaini Mukherjee; Suvam Moitra
- Theme music composer: Ujjaini Mukherjee
- Opening theme: "Jonaki Jane Ki?" by Prashmita Paul
- Composer: Indra (Baban)
- Country of origin: India
- Original language: Bengali
- No. of seasons: 1
- No. of episodes: 594

Production
- Executive producers: Abir; Sunil
- Producers: Snighdha Basu; Sani Ghose Ray
- Running time: 22 minutes
- Production company: Acropoliis Entertainment Pvt. Ltd.

Original release
- Network: Star Jalsha
- Release: 3 September 2018 – 2 August 2020

Related
- Kusum Dola; Sreemoyee Dhrubatara

Irabotir Chupkotha is an Indian Bengali-language television drama television series which aired on Bengali GEC Star Jalsha and is available on the digital platform Hotstar. It premiered on 3 September 2018 to 2 August 2020 and was telecast daily. The show was produced by Acropoliis Entertainment Pvt. Ltd. and featured Monami Ghosh and Syed Arefin in lead roles.

Ghosh plays the lead role of "Iraboti Mitra", a 32-year-old kind and caring lady who is excellent at balancing her job and family. The series marks Ghosh's return to a lead role on Bengali television, since her portrayal of Kankon in Star Jalsha's daily soap opera Punyi Pukur.

== Premise ==
The story revolves around Iraboti Mitra, an independent working woman who balances her professional and personal life very well. She is 32 and unmarried as she devotes herself to nurturing her siblings well after the death of her parents. Her life takes a sudden turn when an arrogant businessman Akash Chatterjee comes in her life and threatens to take her house away, claiming the house to be his property. Later, to support her family members in times of financial crisis, she takes up the job as a P.A. to Akash, serving him with her honest efforts amid the various challenges turned tortures he inflicts upon her to satisfy his ego. Later on, Iraboti slowly discovers and brings about the emotional side of Akash, due to him having a troubled childhood, as his mother left him suddenly on his own, owing to his misery and rough temperament to develop. Amidst all this Iraboti's sister Jhelum tactfully marries Broto who was supposed to be Iraboti's fiancé. While all this is going on, Iraboti and Akash share a simultaneous love-hate relationship as they fight over the legal rights regarding the ownership of the house. Gradually, all the conflicts are settled when Iraboti marries Akash. Rana(Akash's uncle) conspires against the family and uses Jhelum and Mona as pawns. Eventually Jhelum regrets her deeds and Mona stands up against Rana when he tries to harm her children. Rana gets arrested for multiple murder attempts and Iraboti's father's murder. Later on Iraboti gives birth to a daughter called Aarushi. However Aarushi gets kidnapped by Samrat lahiri and she is lost. Iraboti again gets pregnant but she is inconsolable. Later on she gives birth to a boy called Abhro.

=== Few years later ===
Aarushi is still lost. Trisha, Tiya and Dumpo all have grown up. Later on fate brings grown up Aarushi and Iraboti together and she is brought back to her house in Kolkata form Benares, where she was brought up by a foster mother. Aarushi is welcomed by all her siblings. She starts learning English. Later she goes on to win a talent hunt competition, receives many offers for playback singing and becomes popular.

== Cast ==
=== Main ===
- Monami Ghosh as
  - Iraboti "Ira" Mitra Chatterjee – Retired sales executive and part time music teacher; Partha's eldest daughter; Shato, Jhili and Tista's sister; Broto's ex-fiancée; Akash's employee turned wife; Arushi and Abhro's mother.
  - Arushi "Saloni" Chatterjee – A singer; Ira and Akash's long-lost daughter; Abhro's sister; Daampu, Trisha and Tiya's cousin; Abhishek's love interest.
    - Kartisha Bhattacharya as Child Arushi Chatterjee
- Syed Arefin as Akash Chatterjee – A businessman and former NRI; Debjani and Anando's elder son; Rittik's brother; Neel, Sandy and Avik's cousin; Ira's boss turned husband; Arushi and Abhro's father.

=== Recurring ===
- Suchandra Chowdhury as Mrs. Mitra – Matriarch of Mitras'; Partha's mother; Shato, Ira, Jhili and Tista's grandmother.
- Subhrajit Dutta as Shatodru "Shato" Mitra – A sales man; Partha's son; Ira, Jhili and Tista's brother; Piyali's husband; Daampu's father.
- Nayna Banerjee as Piyali Mitra – Shato's wife; Ira's friend; Daampu's mother.
- Surabhi Mallick as Jhelum "Jhili" Mitra Sen – Partha's second daughter; Shato, Ira and Tista's sister; Saptarshi's ex-fiancée; Broto's wife; Trisha's mother.
- Raja Goswami as Subroto "Broto" Sen – Sotyobroto's elder son; Rwito's brother; Saptarshi's cousin; Ira's childhood friend and ex-fiancé; Jhili's husband; Trisha's father.
- Olivia Malakar as Tista "Chhuti" Mitra Chatterjee – Doctor in Philadelphia; Partha's youngest daughter; Shato, Ira and Jhili's sister; Rwito's former love interest; Neel's wife.
- Shayan Mukherjee as Neel Chatterjee – Mona and Rana's son; Sandy's brother; Akash, Rittik and Avik's cousin; Tista's husband.
- Bikash Bhowmik as Partha Mitra – Shato, Ira, Jhili and Tista's father; Daampu, Arushi, Trisha and Abhro's grandfather. (Dead)
- Atmadeep Ghosh as Abhishek – Trisha's former love interest; Arushi's love interest.
- Prarabdhi Singha as Abhro Chatterjee – Ira and Akash's son; Arushi's brother; Daampu, Trisha and Tiya's cousin.
- Pritam Das as Dwaipayan "Daampu" Mitra – Shato and Piyali's son; Arushi, Trisha and Abhro's cousin; Tiya's love interest.
  - Aishik Mukherjee as Child Daampu Mitra
- Alokananda Guha as Tiya Banerjee – Meghna and Avik's daughter; Arushi and Abhro's cousin; Daampu's love interest.
- Soumi Ghosh as Trisha Sen – Jhelum and Broto's daughter; Daampu, Arushi and Abhro's cousin; Abhishek's former love interest.
  - Pritha Ghosh as Child Trisha
- Anuradha Roy as Debjani Banerjee Chatterjee - A popular singer in Rabindra Sangeet; Anando's estranged wife; Akash and Rittik's mother; Ira's mother-figure; Arushi and Abhro's grandmother. (Dead)
- Sumanta Mukherjee as Anando Chatterjee – A retired businessman; Rana and Rupa's brother; Debjani's estranged husband; Akash and Rittik's father; Arushi and Abhro's grandfather. (Dead)
- Suchismita Chowdhury as Mona Chatterjee – Rana's wife; Neel and Sandy's mother; Akash's mother-figure.
- Judhajit Banerjee as Ranajay "Rana" Chatterjee – Anando and Rupa's brother; Mona's husband; Neel and Sandy's father.
- Namita Chakraborty / Mithu Chakraborty as Rupa Chatterjee Banerjee – Anando and Rana's sister; Avik's mother; Tiya's grandmother.
- Rajiv Bose as Avik Banerjee – Rupa's son; Akash, Rittik, Neel and Sandy's cousin; Meghna's widower; Tiya's father.
- Juiee Sarkar / Madhumita Roy as Meghna Banerjee – Ira and Broto's college friend; Avik's wife; Tiya's mother. (Dead)
- Priyanka Chakroborty as Sandy Chattejee – Mona and Rana's daughter; Neel's sister; Akash, Rittik and Avik's cousin.
- Indranil Mallick as Rittik Chatterjee – Debjani and Anando's younger son; Akash's brother; Neel, Sandy and Avik's cousin; Jhelum's love interest.
- Arnab Chowdhury as Rwitobroto "Rwito" Sen – Sotyobroto's younger son; Broto's brother; Saptarshi's cousin; Tista's former love interest.
- Biplab Banerjee / Sanjib Sarkar as Sotyobroto Sen – Broto and Rwito's father.
- Kunal Banerjee as Saptarshi – Broto and Rwito's cousin; Jhili's ex-fiancé.
- Gopa Nandi as Kakoli – A roadside vendor and Iraboti's neighbour.
- Raj Bhattacharya as Siddhartha "Sid" Choudhury – A famous music director.
- Samrat Mukherjee as Dr. Samrat Lahiri

== Adaptations ==
| Language | Title | Premiere date | Network | Last aired | Notes |
|---|---|---|---|---|---|
| Hindi | Baatein Kuch Ankahee Si बातें कुछ अनकही सी | 21 August 2023 | StarPlus | 11 March 2024 | Remake |
