= Dhrubatara =

2020 Indian television series

- Genre: Drama; Thriller supernatural Romance
- Developed by: Acropoliis Entertainment
- Screenplay by: Hrishita Bhattacharya; Dialogue; Antara Banerjee
- Story by: Hrishita Bhattacharya
- Directed by: Bidhan Pal; Bharat
- Presented by: Acropoliis Entertainment
- Starring: Shyamoupti Mudly; Indrajeet Bose; Suvajit Kar
- Theme music composer: Santajit Chatterjee
- Opening theme: "Dhrubatara"
- Country of origin: India
- Original language: Bengali
- No. of seasons: 1
- No. of episodes: 500

Production
- Executive producers: Arnab; Abir (Acropoliis)
- Producers: Snighda Basu; Sani Ghose Ray
- Cinematography: Manai
- Editors: Arunaditya santu
- Camera setup: Multi-camera
- Running time: 22 minutes
- Production company: Acropoliis Entertainment Pvt. Ltd.

Original release
- Network: Star Jalsha
- Release: 27 January 2020 – 19 September 2021

Dhrubatara (transl. Pole Star) is an Indian Bengali television romantic thriller which used to air on Star Jalsha and is also available on digital platform Disney+ Hotstar. It was premiered on 27 January 2020. The show produced by Acropoliis Entertainment Pvt. Ltd., starred Shyamoupti Mudly and Indrajeet Bose as the titular protagonists, Tara and Dhruba, respectively. It ended on 19 September 2021 on a happy note.

== Premise ==
In spite of having some misunderstanding, childhood friends Tara and Agni used to love each other. But the arrival of Dhrubajyoti Lahiri, a business tycoon with his motive of exacting revenge on Agni's family and his marriage with Tara not only twists that equation but also causes a tale of love, compromise, conspiracy and revenge.

== Cast ==
=== Main ===
- Shyamoupti Mudly as Tara Lahiri – A businesswoman and founder of Dhrubartara Industries; Shekhar and Manju's foster daughter; Agni's childhood friend and former love interest; Dhrubo's wife; Uma's mother; Gunja and Shlok's step-mother. (2020–2021)
- Indrajeet Bose as
  - Dhrubajyoti "Dhrubo" Lahiri – Owner of Dhrubatara Industries; Supriya and Gurudev's younger son; Gautam's step-son; Ron's twin brother; Ranja's step-brother; Dipti's adopted brother; Rima's step-cousin; Anuja's ex-husband; Tara's husband; Gunja, Shlok and Uma's father. (2020–2021)
  - Ronodev "Ron" Chowdhury – Owner of RR Enterprise; Supriya and Gurudev's elder son; Dhrubo's twin brother; Ranja's step-brother; Dipti's adopted brother; Tara's fake husband. (2021) (Dead)
- Suvajit Kar as Agni Chowdhury – A businessman and CEO of Dhrubatara Industries; Shekhar and Manju's son; Chandni's brother; Tara's childhood friend and one-sided lover; Gunja's husband. (2020–2021)
- Priyantika Karmakar / Debarati Paul as Gunja Lahiri Chowdhury – Dhrubo and Anuja's daughter; Tara's step-daughter; Shlok's sister; Uma's half-sister; Roshan and Mahi's step-cousin; Agni's wife. (2020–2021)
- Kritika Chakraborty as Uma Lahiri - Dhrubo & Tara's daughter; Gunja and Shlok's half-sister. A gifted girl who possess supernatural powers.

=== Recurring ===
- Animesh Bhaduri as Shekhar Chowdhury – Owner of Chowdhury Textiles; Mrs. Chowdhury's elder son; Anjali and Saikat's brother; Manju's husband; Agni and Chandni's father; Tara's foster father; Dhrubo's former rival; Ranja's former boss (Dead) (2020)
- Moyna Mukherjee as Manju Chowdhury – Ashish's sister; Shekhar's wife; Agni and Chandni's mother; Tara's foster mother (Dead) (2020)
- Suchandra Chowdhury as Mrs. Chowdhury – Shekhar, Anjali and Saikat's mother; Agni and Chadni's grandmother (2020)
- Sanchari Mondal as Chandni Chowdhury Roy – Shekhar and Manju's daughter; Agni's sister; Roshan's ex-wife; Rajib's wife (2020–2021)
- Mallika Majumdar as Anjali Chowdhury – Mrs. Chowdhury's daughter; Shekhar and Saikat's sister; Tara's governess. (2020–2021)
- Avijit Sengupta as Saikat Chowdhury – Mrs. Chowdhury's younger son; Shekhar and Anjali's brother; Dipti's husband. (2020)
- Rayati Bhattacharya as Dipti Lahiri Chowdhury – Supriya and Gautam's adopted daughter; Ron, Dhrubo and Ranja's adopted sister; Saikat's wife. (2020)
- Tanuka Chatterjee as Supriya Lahiri – Matriarch of Lahiri family; Gurudev's ex-lover; Gautam's widow; Dhrubo and Ron's mother; Ranja's step-mother; Dipti's adoptive mother; Gunja, Shlok and Uma's grandmother; Roshan and Mahi's step-grandmother. (2020–2021)
- Kritika Chakraborty as Uma Lahiri – Dhrubo and Tara's daughter; Gunja and Shlok's half-sister; Roshan and Mahi's step-cousin. (2021)
- Ayush Das as Shlok Lahiri – Dhrubo and Anuja's son; Tara's step-son; Gunja's brother; Uma's half-brother; Roshan and Mahi's step-cousin; Tuli's love interest. (2021)
- Liza Sarkar as Tuli Sen – Taniya's sister; Shlok's friend and love interest. (2021)
- Sanghita Ghosh / Tania Kar as Anuja – Dhrubo's ex-wife; Gunja and Shlok's mother; Sid's ex-lover; Lahris' former rival. (2020–2021) (Dead)
- Rupsha Guha / Rii Sen as Ranja Lahiri Banerjee – A corrupt businesswoman; Gautam's daughter; Supriya's step-daughter; Ron and Dhrubo's step-sister; Dipti's adopted sister; Rima's cousin; Animedh's wife; Roshan and Mahi's mother. (2020–2021)
- Namita Chakraborty as Dulu Lahri Chatterjee – Gautam's sister; Rima's mother. (2020–2021)
- Sreejita Biswas as Rima Chatterjee – Dulu's daughter; Ranja's cousin; Ron and Dhrubo's step-cousin; Dipti's adopted cousin. (2021)
- Avijit Dev Roy as Animesh Banerjee – Ranja's husband; Roshan and Mahi's father. (2020–2021)
- Raj Sen as Roshan Banerjee – Animesh and Ranja's son; Mahi's brother; Gunja, Shlok and Uma's step-cousin; Chandni's ex-husband. (2020–2021)
- Shakshi Roy as Mahi Banerjee Chatterjee – Animesh and Ranja's daughter; Roshan's sister; Gunja, Shlok and Uma's step-cousin; Kush's wife. (2020–2021)
- Kunal Banerjee as Dr. Kush Chatterjee – Mahi's husband.(2020–2021)

=== Others ===
- Subhrajit Dutta as Ashish – Manju's brother; Shirsha's husband. (2020)
- Shreyasee Samanta as Shirsha – Ashish's wife. (2020)
- Himanshu De as Ratan Adhikari – Manager of Lahiri Industries and later of Dhrubotara Industries. (2020–2021)
- Indranil Mallick as Siddhartha "Sid" Chowdhury – Chandra's adopted son; Dhrubo's college friend turned foe; Anuja's former boyfriend. (2020–2021)
- Kushal Papai Bhowmick as Shirish Sanyal – Mr. Sanyal's son; Gunja's childhood friend and ex-fiancé. (2020–2021)
- Debargha Majumdar as Sameer Agarwal – Mahi's ex-fiancé. (2020)
- Ratan Sarkhel as Keshav "Gurudev" Chandra Ghosh – Supriya's ex-lover; Ron and Dhrubo's father; Gunja, Shlok and Uma's grandfather; Lahris' former rival. (2020–2021)
- Purbasha Debnath as Anurupa- Gurudev's pupil, Tara's enemy (jailed) (2021)
- Prarona Bhattacharya as Mili- Gurudev's pupil who befriends Tara (2021)
- Biresh Chakraborty as Inspector Rajib Roy- an honest police officer, Dhrubo's best friend, Chandni's love interest and second husband (2021)
- Arpita Mondal as Taniya Sen- Agni's friend and assistant; Gunja's love rival (2021)
- Moumita Chakrabarty as Chandra Chowdhury- Ron, Dhrubo and Ranja's maternal aunt, Sid's adoptive mother, rival of the Lahiri family (Jailed) (2021)

=== Guest appearance ===
- Gora Dhar as a police officer.
