= Kaushik Chakraborty =

Indian Bengali actor

- Born: 2 December 1968 (age 57)
- Occupation: Actor
- Notable work: Behula C.I.D. Kolkata Bureau; Andarmahal; Kiranmala

Kaushik Chakraborty (born 2 December 1968) is an Indian Bengali actor, who mainly works in Bengali television serials and films. He is best known for his role as ACP Bir Singha in the detective television series C.I.D. Kolkata Bureau. He has acted in many television serials and films, including Andarmahal, Kiranmala, Netaji, Bob Biswas, Challenge 2, Manush: Child of Destiny, and Faande Poriya Boga Kaande Re.

== List of works ==
=== Films ===
Year	Film	Role	Ref.
2011	Faande Poriya Boga Kaande Re	Mishti's elder brother	
2012	Challenge 2	Shibu Dutta	
2014	Arundhati	Agnidev Bhatta	
2014	Golpo Holeo Shotti		
2014	Ghuri		
2018	Ray		
2019	The Tashkent Files	R. N. Chug	
2021	Bob Biswas	Ustaad	
2022	Faraaz	RAB Officer Benazir	
2023	Manush: Child of Destiny	Diwan ji	

=== Television ===
Year	Title	Role	Ref.
	Barir Naam Bhalobasha		
2008	Sukh – Thikana Baikunthapur		
2010–2011	Behula	Chand Sadagar	
2012–2014	C.I.D. Kolkata Bureau	ACP Bir Singha	
2013–2014	Mahabharat	Shalya	
2013–2014	Bodhu Kon Alo Laaglo Chokhe	Adinath Siddhanth	
2014–2016	Kiranmala	Raja Bijoy	
2015–2016	Suryaputra Karn	Shalya	
2015–2016	Goyenda Ginni	Pronob Majumdar	
2015	Bodhuboron	Arunesh Chatterjee	
2016–2018	Kusum Dola	Dr. Amolin Bose	
2017–2018	Andarmahal	Abhimanyu Bose aka Abhi	
2018–2020	Nokshi Kantha	Late Iqbal Sheikh	
2019	Sasurbari Zindabad		
2019–2020	Ekhane Aakash Neel	Dr. Samaresh Chatterjee	
2019–2020	Netaji	Janakinath Bose	
2020–2021	Phirki	Bhaskar Sinha Roy	
2021	Rimli	Asit Boron Mukherjee	
2021	Saanjher Baati	Niloy Dostidaar	
2021–2023	Mithai	Samaresh "Samu" Modak	
2022	Pilu	Aditya Narayan Mukhopadhyay	
2022	Mon Phagun	Apratim Sen Sharma	
2022–2023	Gaatchora	Debangshu Singha Roy	
2023	Jaatishawr	Sudhamoy Chowdhury	
2024	Ashtami	Thakur Purshuttom Singha Roy	
2024	Neem Phooler Madhu	Superstar Indra Kumar	
2024–2025	Mittir Bari	Advocate Raghu Rai	
2025	Kothha	Basu Guruji	
2025	Video Bouma	Arunabho Lahiri	
2025	Milon Hobe Kotodine		
2026–Present	Satipith Kalighat	Raja Basanta Roy	
