= Sagarika (TV series) =

- Bengali: সাগরিকা
- Genre: Drama; Romance; Sports
- Screenplay by: Vivek Ranjan Chatterjee
- Story by: Ashita Bhattacharya; Dialogues; Ayan Chakroborty
- Directed by: Babu Banik
- Creative directors: Satyaki and Birsha Dasgupta
- Presented by: Acropoliis Entertainment
- Starring: Kritish Chaakaraborty; Ritika Seth
- Voices of: Ujjaini Mukherjee; Suvam Moitra
- Theme music composer: Ujjaini Mukherjee
- Composer: Indra (Baban)
- Country of origin: India
- Original language: Bengali
- No. of seasons: 1
- No. of episodes: 203

Production
- Producers: Soumen Halder; Sumalya Bhattacharya
- Camera setup: Multi-camera
- Running time: 22 minutes (approx.)
- Production company: Acropoliis Entertainment Pvt. Ltd.

Original release
- Network: Sun Bangla
- Release: 3 February – 25 August 2019

Sagarika was an Indian Bengali television soap opera that premiered on 3 February 2019 and airs on Sun Bangla every day. The show was produced by Acropoliis Entertainment Pvt. Ltd. It stars Ritika Seth and Kritish Chaakaraborty in lead roles and Uponita Bnaerjee, Shreyasree Samanta, and Arindam Banerjee in prominent supporting roles. The show went off air on 25 August 2019 due to constantantly low trp ratings.

== Plot ==
Sagarika is a sport based, new age progressive story of a woman, inspired by swimming legends of Bengal who dared to dream and achieve. The story begins with Rai, a village girl from a very modest background, who has a big dream of conquering the world of swimming and crossing the seven seas. In her pursuits, she faces various hurdles from the society, family, rivals and from her in-laws.

== Cast ==
=== Main cast ===
- Ritika Seth
- Kritish Chaakaraborty as Sanjay Laha
