= Agnipariksha (2009 TV series) =

2009 Indian television series

- Genre: Indian Soap Opera
- Created by: Acropoliis Entertainment Pvt. Ltd.
- Screenplay by: Puja Chatterji; Soumyava Goswami; Asita; Dialogue; Chandan, Kunal, Arpita, Sourav
- Directed by: Sudipto Das
- Country of origin: India
- Original language: Bengali
- No. of episodes: 1533

Production
- Producer: Snigdha Basu
- Production locations: Kolkata, West Bengal, India
- Running time: 22 minutes
- Production company: Acropoliis Entertainment Pvt. Ltd.

Original release
- Network: Zee Bangla
- Release: May 18, 2009 – April 5, 2014

Agnipariksha (transl. Trial by Fire) was an Indian Bengali television series that was telecasted by Zee Bangla between 2009 and 2014. One of the longest running Bengali television soap opera, the series starred Sonali Chowdhury and popular cine-actor Bhaswar Chatterjee in lead roles

== Plot ==
The serial is about the story of a dark-skinned girl. It revolved around a girl and her everyday struggles of colorimeter and life generally.

== Cast ==
=== Main ===
- Sonali Chowdhury as Aparna Debroy (née Aparna Maitra): Nirupama's elder daughter; Doyel and Rai's sister; Saikat's wife; Ayushi's mother.
- Bhaswar Chatterjee as Saikat Debroy: Dibakar and Sutapa's elder son; Bashudha and Mayukh's brother; Aparna's husband.
- Swaralipi Chatterjee as Doyel Adhikary (née Doyel Maitra): Nirupama's second daughter; Aparna and Rai's sister; Rudro's wife; Neel's mother.
- Shoumo Banerjee as Rudronil Adhikary/Rudro: Doyel's husband; Neel's father.
- Sarbani Chakraborty as Rai Bose (née Rai Maitra): Nirupama's younger daughter; Aparna and Doyel's sister; Krishanu's wife.
- Dwaipayan Das as Krishanu Bose: Rai's husband.
- Anindita Bhattacharya / Piyali Mukherjee as Ayushi Debroy Chatterjee: Aparna and Saikat's daughter; Mekhla's cousin sister; Agni's wife
- Rupsa Chatterjee as Mekhla Debroy Chatterjee: Mohona and Mayukh's daughter; Ayushi's cousin sister; Ani's wife.
- Abhishek Saha / Arnab Chowdhury as Ani Chatterjee: Mekhla's husband; Ayushi's former lover; Agni's brother.
- Biresh Chakraborty as Agni Chatterjee: Ayushi's husband; Ani's elder brother.

=== Recurring ===
- Rimjhim Mitra as Mohona Debroy: Mayukh's wife; Mekhla's mother.
- Dhrubajyoti Sarkar as Mayukh Debroy: Dibakar and Sutapa's younger son; Saikat and Bashudha's brother; Mohona's husband; Mekhla's father.
- Dr. Basudeb Mukherjee as Dibakar Debroy: Saikat, Mayukh and Bashudha's father; Sutapa's husband; Aparna's father-in-law. Head of Debroy Family.
- Nandini Chatterjee as Sutapa Debroy: Saikat, Mayukh and Bashuda's mother; Dibakar's wife; Aparna's Mother-in-law.
- Lopamudra Sinha / Samata Das as Bashudha: Dibakar and Sutapa's daughter; Saikat and Mayukh's sister; Rono's wife.
- Debshankar Haldar as Rono: Bashudha's husband.
- Kamalika Banerjee / Ranjini Chattopadhayay as Jayanti: Sutapa's sister; Saikat, Mayukh and Bashudha's Maternal aunt; Debojit's wife.
- Debarati Paul as Piu: Jayanti's daughter.
- Biplab Banerjee as Debojit: Jayanti's husband; Saikat, Mayukh and Bashudha's Maternal Uncle.
- Papiya Sen as Tui Maa: Sutapa's Elder sister; Saikat, Mayukh and Bashudha's Maternal Aunt.
- Animesh Bhaduri as Rajat: Saikat's friend; Aparna's former fiancée.
- Ankita Chakraborty as Madhura: Ananda's daughter; Saikat's former fiancée.
- Mayna Banerjee as Lily: Sasankha's daughter; Dibakar's niece; Saikat, Mayukh and Bashudha's cousin sister.
- Bratya Basu as Sasankha: Dibakar's brother; Lily's father; Saikat, Mayukh and Bashudha's Paternal uncle.
- Goutam Dey as Ananda: Dibakar's friend; Madhura's father.
- Rupsha Guha as Chandra Chowdhury: Meera's daughter; Rudro's lover; Rishi's adopted mother.
- Rajat Ganguly as Someshwar Adhikary: Rudro's father; Doyel's Father-in-law. Head of Adhikary family.
- Aparajita Ghosh as Rajeshwari Roychowdhury aka Raji: Someshwar's sister; Rudro's Paternal aunt.
- Baisakhi Marjit as Meera Chowdhury: Chandra's mother; Adhikary family's caretaker.
- Manasi Sinha as Rohini Maitra: Sandip and Sujan's mother; Aparna, Doyel and Rai's Paternal aunt.
- Phalguni Chatterjee as Monotosh Maitra: Rohini's husband; Sandip and Sujan's father; Aparna, Doyel and Rai's Paternal uncle.
- Sandip Chakraborty as Sandip Maitra: Aparna, Doyel and Rai's cousin brother; Sujan's elder brother.
- Soma Dey as Nirupoma: Aparna, Doyel and Rai's mother.
- Sourav Das as Sujan Maitra: Aparna, Doyel and Rai's cousin brother; Sandip's brother.
- Promita Chakraborty as Muskan.
- Atonu as Irfan: Muskan's husband; Sandip's childhood friend.
- Anindya Banerjee as Arjun Sinha.
- Kushal Chakraborty as Dr. Satrughna.
- Sritama Bhattacharjee as Binni: Sujan's girlfriend.
- Anindya Chakrabarti as Chandan Roy Chowdhury: Urmila's father
- Sreetama Roy Chowdhury / Rumpa Das as Ahona: Ani and Agni's cousin sister; Rishi's fiancée.
- Mithu Chakraborty as Agni's mother; Ayushi and Mekhla's Mother-in-law.
- Sumanta Mukherjee as Agni's father; Ayushi and Mekhla's Father-in-law.
- Prerona Bhattacharjee as Urmila Maitra: Sujan's Wife; Chandan's Daughter; Monotosh and Rohini's younger daughter-in-law.
- Rajiv Bose as Adult Sujan Maitra.
- Priyanka Rati Pal as Ruby: Agni's love interest.
- Sudip Sarkar as Rishi: Chandra's adoptive son; Ahona's fiancé.

== Leap ==
The show took an 18-year leap in 2013 and gain more trp ratings, After the leap the story was focused on the love story between Ayushi, Agni and Mekhla.
