= Shaheber Chithi =

2022 Indian television series

- Genre: Drama; Romance
- Created by: Acropoliis Entertainment
- Developed by: Acropoliis Entertainment
- Starring: Pratik Sen; Debchandrima Singha Roy; Subhadra Mukherjee; Devlina Kumar
- Opening theme: "Shaheber Chithi"
- Country of origin: India
- Original language: Bengali
- No. of seasons: 1
- No. of episodes: 210

Production
- Production location: Kolkata
- Camera setup: Multi-camera
- Running time: 22 minutes
- Production company: Acropoliis Entertainment

Original release
- Network: Star Jalsha
- Release: 27 June 2022 – 22 January 2023

Shaheber Chithi is a 2022 show which premiered on Bengali general entertainment channel Star Jalsha from 27 June 2022. The show is produced by Acropoliis Entertainment, starring Pratik Sen and Debchandrima Singha Roy in the lead roles, alongside Devlina Kumar, Oindrila Bose, Madhupriya Chowdhury in supporting roles.

== Plot ==
Shaheb is a famous singer and an icon of Bengal, while Chithi, a sweet girl full of life is a postmaster. Chithi delivers letters, even though the world has become electronic, and the use of emails have risen considerably. Shaheb loses his leg in an accident and decides to retire permanently from singing and stay away from the public eye forever. Destiny brings these two souls together, and the pure-hearted Chithi promises to help him get back to singing and lead a normal life. Navigating the various obstacles and conspiracies that are put in their path, they begin to understand each other, support each other and in the process fall in love.

== Cast ==
=== Main ===
- Pratik Sen as Shaheb Mukherjee – a famous singer and icon of Bengal, footballer, hero, Chithi's husband
- Debchandrima Singha Roy as Chithi Mukherjee (née Sanyal) – Shaheb's wife, a postwoman and peon
- Devlina Kumar as Raima Chatterjee – an actress, Shaheb's rival, a greedy girl. (Main antagonist)
- Vivaan Ghosh as Ankush Roy Chowdhury aka Roy - Shaheb's younger cousin brother and rival, Mithila's estranged son. (Main Antagonist) (2023)

=== Recurring ===
Saheb's family

- Oindrila Bose as Sara Sanyal (née Mukherjee) – Shaheb's sister, Bunty's wife, Abhi's fake ex-wife (Former antagonist)
- Sagnik Chatterjee as Arijit Mukherjee – Shaheb's father (Former Antagonist)
- Mallika Banerjee as Bidipta Mukherjee – Shaheb's mother
- Chandicharan as Shaheb's paternal grandfather
- Suchanda Chowdhury as Shucha Mukherjee - Shaheb's paternal grandmother
- Dipanjan Jack Bhattacharya as Indrajit Mukherjee – Shaheb's uncle
- Rajasree Bhowmick as Rupanjana Mukherjee – Indrajit's wife, Saheb's aunt
- Moumita Chakraborty as Swarno- Shaheb's younger grandmother who await for her husband's letter
- Tanuka Chatterjee as Mithila Mukherjee – Shaheb's aunt (Antagonist)
- Ananya Sengupta as Parna Mukherjee - Shaheb's aunt
- Sreetama Roy Chowdhury as Sritama – Shaheb's cousin sister
- Indranil Mallick as Abhi – Shaheb's friend, Bhumi's husband, Sara's fake ex-husband
- Arunava Dey as Mihir Mukherjee – Shaheb's cousin brother
- Piyali Sasmal as Sukriti Mukherjee – Mihir's wife
- Pritam Das as Sunny Mukherjee - Shaheb's cousin brother

Chithi's family

- Sanjib Sarkar as Subimal Sanyal- former post master, Chithi, Bhumi and Bunty's father
- Subhadra Mukherjee as Kaberi Sanyal (née Chakraborty) – Chithi, Bhumi and Bunty's mother
- Madhupriya Chowdhury as Bhumi Sanyal – Chithi's sister, Abhi's wife
- Ritwick Purakait as Bunty Sanyal – Chithi's brother
