= Membou =

- Genre: Drama; Romance; Comedy; Horror supernatural
- Created by: Acropoliis Entertainments Pvt. Ltd.
- Story by: Pravin Raaj; Dialogues; Antara Banerjee
- Directed by: Krishna Kar
- Creative director: Babu Banik
- Starring: Vinita Chatterjee; Sourav Chakraborty; Dulal Lahiri; Mithu Chakraborty
- Country of origin: India
- Original language: Bengali
- No. of seasons: 1
- No. of episodes: 238

Production
- Producers: Snigdha Basu, Sunny Ghosh Roy
- Production location: Kolkata
- Running time: 22 minutes
- Production company: Acropoliis Entertainments Pvt. Ltd.

Original release
- Network: Star Jalsha
- Release: 19 September 2016 – 14 May 2017

Membou (Bengali: মেমবউ) is a Bengali television soap opera which premiered on Star Jalsha on 19 September 2016. It was produced by Acropoliis Entertainment Pvt. Ltd. It stars Vinita Chatterjee, Sourav Chakraborty, with Dulal Lahiri, Mithu Chakraborty in supporting roles.

== Plot ==
Carol, a young woman of foreign origin, comes to India in search of her roots. Sparks fly when she meets Koustav, an orthodox Bengali. Koustav and his grandfather, Shibnath, fly to Georgia to attend a conference, where he meets Carol. After that, Koustav accidentally meets Carol everywhere and circumstances lead them to fight every time. Carol comes to India, but falls in a trap set by Rajan and Raghav. Koustav rescues Carol from these situations and marries her, stunning his family members.

== Cast ==
- Vinita Chatterjee as Carol Brown
- Sourav Chakrabarty as Koustov Lahiri aka Gora
- Dulal Lahiri as Sibnath - Koustov's paternal grandfather
- Alokananda Roy as Sibnath's wife, Koustov's paternal grandmother
- Mithu Chakraborty as Sibnath's widowed younger sister
- Saptarshi Roy as Biresh, Koustov's father
- Nandini Chatterjee as Biresh's wife, Koustov's mother
- Kaushik Banerjee as Carol and Shree's father
- Mallika Banerjee as Carol and Shree's mother
- Priyyam Chakraborty as Shree, Koustov's second wife, Carol's half sister
- Arindam Banerjee as Paresh, Koustov's younger paternal uncle
- Moyna Mukherjee as Paresh's wife, Koustov's younger paternal aunt
- Abhijit Debroy as Debesh, Koustov's youngest paternal uncle
- Arpita Mukherjee as Debesh's wife, Koustov's youngest paternal aunt
- Mallika Majumder as Pishimoni, Sibnath's only daughter
- Anirban Guha as Sibnath's son-in-law
- Dhrubajyoti Sarkar as Raghav Lunia
- Suman Dey as Zico
- Deerghoi Paul as Titli, Paresh's daughter, Zico's wife, Koustov's one-sided lover
- Upanita Banerjee as Shampa
- Unknown as Paresh's son, Titli's elder brother, Shampa's husband
