= Bodhuboron =

Indian television series

- Genre: Drama; Romance; Comedy
- Created by: Acropoliis Entertainment
- Based on: Saath Nibhaana Saathiya
- Screenplay by: Ashita Bhattacharya; Dialogue; Sayan Chowdhury
- Directed by: Babu Banik; Chitrabhanu Basu (pre-direction); Bubai (pre-direction)
- Opening theme: "Bodhuboron"
- Country of origin: India
- Original language: Bengali
- No. of episodes: 1163

Production
- Executive producers: Aratrika (Star Jalsha); Sromona Ghose (Star Jalsha)
- Production locations: Kolkata; Village near Kolkata
- Cinematography: Sandip; Mithun Banerjee (sound management)
- Editors: Nilanjan; Jishu
- Camera setup: Multi-camera
- Running time: 22 minutes
- Production company: Acropoliis Entertainment

Original release
- Network: Star Jalsha
- Release: 19 August 2013 – 29 January 2017

Related
- Saath Nibhaana Saathiya

Bodhuboron is a Bengali language television serial which began airing on Star Jalsha from 19 August 2013. One of the longest running Bengali television soap opera, the series starred Gourab Chatterjee and Pramita Chakraborty in lead roles. It was the remake of the Hindi show Saath Nibhaana Saathiya. This show did its second time repeat telecast on Star Jalsha from 10 June 2024.

== Plot ==
The story revolves around a simple innocent orphaned village girl named Konok. She does all the household work yet her aunt sikha and cousin Jhilmil cannot tolerate her and torture her daily. She is illiterate and they do not allow her to take any education. One day Indira Chowdhury comes to their home with his son Satyaki for marriage of Jhilmil with Satyaki who already has an affair with Teesta. But instead of Jhilmil she likes Konok and decides to make the latter her daughter-in-law, going against the wishes of her son.

Later both Konok and Jhilmil are married to Satyaki and Avro (Satyaki's cousin) respectively. Jhilmil is jealous of Konok as she failed to become elder daughter-in-law of Chowdhury mansion which may deprive her of inheriting the property of the Chowdhury family. She, along with the evil plans of her mother Sikha creates problems in Konok's life and tries to get her out of the house. With all of these troubles on her shoulder, Konok completes all of her duties & wins all other family member's hearts. Later Satyaki also coming out from his past, falls in love with Konok and accepts her as his wife. In all the troubles Indira supports her as her own daughter making an inherent bond between a mother-in-law and daughter-in-law.

Taking the opportunity of brother's death Teesta comes again in Satyaki and Konok's married life to make Konok's life hell. She pretends as mentally unstable and innocent Konok takes her in Chowdhury mansion going against everyone's decision. Teesta now makes problems to kick Konok out of the house and to bring back Satyaki again in her life. Later Satyaki and Oli's greedy and selfish mother Bidisha comes back and plots against Konok and Indira. Eventually Bidisha repents and apologies to everyone and finally surrenders herself to law.

The show ends with Jhilmil saving the family from a bomb blast while dying in it herself. Her death shatters everyone and completely reforms Shikha. Avro marries another woman Mahi who cares for the twin daughters of Avro and Jhilmil. But Avra still loves and misses Jhilmil. Mahi realises her mistakes and starts loving everyone. Chowdhury family are also happy with Konok and Satyaki's baby boy. From jail, Bidisha gave Konok a clue against Arunish. Indira and Konok ensures that Arunish, the main mastermind behind all the terrible attacks and murder attempts gets arrested and Teesta and Debu also gets arrested for being a part of them. The last scene shows that 25 years later Konok is welcoming her adult son and daughter-in-law.

== Cast ==
=== Main ===
- Promita Chakraborty as Konok Chowdhury – Dayananda and Shikha's niece; Jhilmil's cousin; Satyaki's wife
- Gourab Chatterjee as Satyaki Chowdhury – A businessman; Nikhilesh and Bidisha's son; Indira's step-son; Oli's brother; Abhra's cousin; Konok's husband; Teesta's ex-fiancée
- Anjana Basu as Indira Chowdhury – A kind-hearted businesswoman; Nikilesh's second wife; Satyaki and Oli's step-mother
- Sreetama Roy Chowdhury as Jhilmil Goswami Chowdhury – Dayananda and Shikha's daughter; Konok's cousin; Abhro's first wife (Dead)
- Suman Dey as Abhra Chowdhury – Akhilesh and Nirmala's son; Satyaki and Oli's cousin; Jhilmil's widower; Mahi's husband

=== Recurring ===
- Suranjana Roy as Mahi Chowdhury- Abhra's second wife
- Kaushik Chakraborty as Arunesh Chatterjee / Radheshyam - a corrupt businessman, Indira's obsessive lover and rival
- Alokananda Roy as Annopurna/ Rangama - matriarch, Akhilesh and Nikhilesh's mother
- Manishankar Banerjee as Akhilesh Chowdhury- Abhra 's father
- Mithu Chakraborty as Nirmala Chowdhury - Abhra's mother
- Bikash Bhowmik as Nikhilesh Chowdhury- Bidisha's former husband, Indira's husband, Satyaki's and Oli's father
- Tulika Basu as Bidisha Chowdhury- Satyaki and Oli's mother
- Judhajit Banerjee as Biresh
- Ratan Sarkhel as Dayananda Goswami, Jhilmil's father
- Nandini Chatterjee as Shikha Goswami- Jhilmil's mother
- Kanyakumari Mukherjee as Teesta Roy- Satyaki's love interest
- Diya Chakraborty as Oli- Satyaki's sister
- Dhrubajyoti Sarkar as Arup- Oli's husband, a doctor
- Subho Roy Chowdhury as Rahul Roy- Teesta's brother, Oli's obsessive love
- Subhrajit Dutta as Debu da, Jhilmil's maternal cousin
- Sayantani Sengupta as Sriparna- Satyaki's paternal aunt
- Abhijit Debroy as Partho- an IPS officer, Sriparna's husband
- Juhi Sengupta as Nikita, Abhra's friend and former love interest
- Gopa Nandi as Debu's mother, Jhilmil's maternal aunt
- Deerghoi Paul
- Mridul Majumdar as Mahesh
- Indraneil Mullick as John
- Saswati Guha Thakurta as College Principal
- Avrajit Chakraborty as Dipak
- Hersale Mallick as Bristy
- Adrija Roy as Putul
- Riya Ganguly
- Jagriti Goswami
- Sayantan Halder
- Saugata Bandyopadhyay

== Reception ==
The Times of India states Konok and Indira – the lead characters in the soap – have become household names in Bengal. At one point of time during its run that the CM of West Bengal, Smt. Mamata Banerjee did not miss a single episode of the soap (as was told by Anjana Basu and Pramita Chakraborty at an interview).

== Adaptations ==
Language	Title	Original release	Network(s)	Last aired	Notes
Hindi	Saath Nibhaana Saathiya साथ निभाना साथिया	3 May 2010	StarPlus	23 July 2017	Original
Marathi	Pudhcha Paaul पुढचं पाऊल	2 May 2011	Star Pravah	30 June 2017	Remake
Tamil	Deivam Thandha Veedu தெய்வம் தந்த வீடு	15 July 2013	Star Vijay	26 May 2017	Remake
Malayalam	Chandanamazha ചന്ദനമഴ	3 February 2014	Asianet	9 December 2017	Remake
Bengali	Bodhuboron বধুবরন	19 August 2013	Star Jalsha	29 January 2017	Remake
Telugu	Intiki Deepam Illalu ఇంటికి దీపం ఇల్లాలు	8 March 2021	Star Maa	9 September 2023	Remake
