= Star Jalsha =

Indian Bengali-language television channel

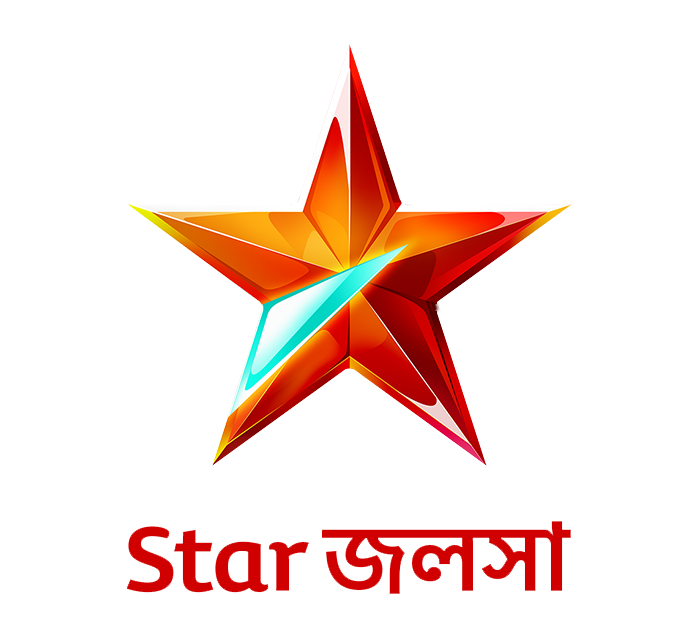
- Logo used since 2019
- Country: India
- Broadcast area: India; Bangladesh
- Network: JioStar
- Headquarters: Kolkata, West Bengal, India

Programming
- Language: Bengali
- Picture format: 1080p HDTV

Ownership
- Owner: JioStar
- Sister channels: JioStar channels

History
- Launched: 8 September 2008; 18 years ago

Links
- Website: Star Jalsha

Star Jalsha is an Indian Bengali language general entertainment pay television channel owned by JioStar, a joint venture between Viacom18 and Disney India. It primarily broadcasts family dramas, comedies, reality shows and films. It launched its own HD feed on 14 April 2016.

== History ==
Star Jalsha was officially launched on 8 September 2008 and is the first non-regional, non-Hindi and non-English channel of Star Network. This was Star India's second Bengali-language television channel of Star India after Star Ananda. In 2011, it was launched on the OSN platform in the Middle East.

On 17 June 2012, during a special event Cholo Paltai, it rebranded with a new diamond star logo and graphics for the first time since its launch. On 22 November 2012, the channel was launched in UK.

The channel launched its own high-definition feed, along with Jalsha Movies HD, on 14 April 2016. They were the first Bengali-language HD channels in India.

In 2018, Sagnik Ghosh became the head of the channel. On 17 February 2019, during a special event called Jalsha Doshe Dosh (Meaning Ten-on-Ten), on account of Star Jalsha's 10th birthday, the channel rebranded for the second time from a white logo with red accents to a red logo with blue accents. It also introduced new coloured graphics after almost 7 years, which are not red and white in the history of the channel, but predominantly turquoise blue with the hints of golden and yellow. The serials also no longer use their own logo. Instead, they use the Kohinoor font for the name of the serial in the cover picture of a particular serial. However, in recent past, the reality shows and events have featured their own logos in the channel with Star Jalsha's Bengali font Kohinoor Bangla.

On 2 October 2021, Star Jalsha, along with other foreign television channels that did not provide clean feeds, was temporarily suspended from broadcasting in Bangladesh. However, on 18 October 2021, Star Jalsha resumed broadcasts in the country with clean feed.

== Current broadcast ==
Premiere date	Series	Ref
10 March 2025	Parashuram – Ajker Nayok	
18 February 2026	Shudhu Tomari Jonyo	
10 March 2026	Ganga	
9 April 2026	Pratigga	
13 April 2026	Sangsarer Sangkirtan	
17 June 2026	Kumkum	
27 July 2026	Tilottama	
30 August 2026	Bigg Boss Bangla season 3	
28 September 2026	Ashirbad	

== Former broadcast ==
=== Drama series ===
- Aaj Aari Kaal Bhaab (2015–2016)
- Aanchol (2012–2014)
- Aalta Phoring (2022–2023)
- Aay Tobe Sohochori (2021–2022)
- Adorini (2017–2018)
- Adwitiya (2011–2012)
- Aparajito (2011–2012)
- Ardhangini (2018)
- Ami Sirajer Begum (2018–2019)
- Agnijal (2016–2017)
- Aloukik Na Loukik (2019)
- Anurager Chhowa (2022–2025)
- Babli Sundori (2026)
- Balijhor (2023)
- Bajlo Tomar Alor Benu (2018–2019)
- Bandhan (2008–2009)
- Bangla Medium (2022–2023)
- Behula (2010–2011)
- Bidhir Bidhaan (2012–2013)
- Bhakter Bhogoban Shri Krishna (2016–2018)
- Bhaktir Sagar (2024)
- Bhojo Gobindo (2017–2018)
- Bodhua (2024)
- Bouma Ekghor (2022)
- Bhaggolokkhi (2020–2021)
- Bhalobasha.com (2010–2014)
- Bhasha (2012–2013)
- Bholebaba Paar Karega (2025–2026)
- Bhoomikanya (2018–2019)
- Bijoyinee (2018–2019)
- Bikram Betal (2022)
- Bodhuboron (2013–2017)
- Bodhu Kon Alo Laaglo Chokhe (2012–2014)
- Bojhena Se Bojhena (2013–2016)
- Boron (2021–2022)
- Bou Kotha Kao (2009–2012)
- Bullet Sarojini (2025)
- Care Kori Na (2012–2013)
- Charulata (2009–2010)
- Checkmate (2012)
- Cheeni (2024)
- Chiroksokha (2025–2026)
- Chirosathi (2012–2014)
- Chokher Tara Tui (2014–2016)
- Compass (2025–2026)
- Chuni Panna (2019–2020)
- Debi Choudhurani (2018–2019)
- Debipaksha (2017)
- Desher Maati (2021)
- Dhanni Meye (2009–2011)
- Dhrubatara (2020–2021)
- Dhulokona (2021–2022)
- Dui Shalik (2024–2025)
- Dugga Dugga (2016–2017)
- Durga (2008–2010)
- Durga Durgeshwari (2019–2020)
- Ekhane Aakash Neel (2008–2010)
- Ekhane Aakash Neel (2019–2020)
- Ekka Dokka (2022–2023)
- Falna (2021–2022)
- Gaaner Oparey (2010–2011)
- Geeta LL.B (2023–2025)
- Gaatchora (2021–2023)
- Ghore Pherar Gaan (2012–2013)
- Gramer Rani Binapani (2021–2022)
- Gopal Bhar (2017–2018)
- Grihoprobesh (2024–2026)
- Gangaram (2020–2022)
- Godhuli Alap (2022–2023)
- Guddi (2022–2023)
- Guriya Jekhane Guddu Sekhane (2019–2020)
- Horogouri Pice Hotel (2022–2025)
- Ichche Nodee (2015–2017)
- Irabotir Chupkotha (2018–2020)
- Ishti Kutum (2011–2015)
- Jai Kali Kalkattawali (2017–2019)
- Jani Dekha Hobe (2014–2015)
- Jibon Jyoti (2018)
- Jhanjh Lobongo Phool (2016–2017)
- Jol Nupur (2013–2015)
- Jol Thoi Thoi Bhalobasha (2023–2024)
- Kamala O Sreeman Prithwiraj (2023)
- Kanamachi (2014–2015)
- Kapalkundala (2019–2020)
- Ke Apon Ke Por (2016–2020)
- Khelaghor (2020–2022)
- Khokababu (2016–2018)
- Khorkuto (2020–2022)
- Khukumoni Home Delivery (2021–2022)
- Kiranmala (2014–2016)
- Koler Bou (2019–2020)
- Kora Pakhi (2020–2021)
- Kothha (2023–2025)
- Kuheli (2008–2009)
- Kunjochhaya (2019–2020)
- Kusum Dola (2016–2018)
- Kundo Phuler Mala (2017–2018)
- Love Biye Aaj Kal (2023–2024)
- Lokkhi Jhnapi (2025–2026)
- Mahapeeth Tarapeeth (2019–2022)
- Maa....Tomay Chara Ghum Ashena (2009–2014)
- Madhabilata (2022)
- Mahanayak (2016)
- Mayar Badhon (2017–2018)
- Mayurpankhi (2018–2019)
- Megher Palok (2011–2012)
- Membou (2016–2017)
- Meyebela (2023)
- Milon Tithi (2015–2017)
- Milon Hobe Kotodine (2025–2026)
- Mohor (2019–2022)
- Mon Niye Kachakachi (2015)
- Mon Phagun (2021–2022)
- Mouchak (2013–2014)
- Mukhosh Manush (2010–2011)
- Nabab Nandini (2023–2024)
- Neer Bhanga Jhor (2008–2009)
- Nojor (2019)
- Ogo Bodhu Sundori (2009–2010)
- Ogo Nirupoma (2020–2021)
- Om Namah Shivay (2018)
- O Mor Dorodiya (2025–2026)
- Phagun Bou (2018–2019)
- Ponchomi (2022-2023)
- Potol Kumar Gaanwala (2015–2017)
- Pratidaan (2017–2018)
- Premer Kahini (2017–2018)
- Professor Bidya Banerjee (2025–2026)
- Punyi Pukur (2015–2017)
- Prothoma Kadambini (2020–2021)
- Rajrajeshwari Rani Bhabani (2025–2026)
- Rakhi Bandhan (2016–2019)
- Ramprasad (2023–2024)
- Rangamati Tirandaj (2024–2026)
- Roshnai (2024–2025)
- Saanjher Baati (2019–2021)
- Sansar Sukher Hoy Romonir Guney (2011–2013)
- Shedin Dujone (2011)
- Shree Krishna Bhakto Meera (2021)
- Shubho Bibaho (2024–2026)
- Sandhya Tara (2023–2014)
- Sanyashi Raja (2017–2018)
- Shaheber Chithi (2022–2023)
- Sreemoyee (2019–2021)
- Tekka Raja Badshah (2018–2019)
- Tentul Pata (2024–2025)
- Thik Jeno Love Story (2014–2015)
- Tomader Rani (2023–2024)
- Tomay Amay Mile (2013–2016)
- Tumi Asbe Bole (2014–2016)
- Tumi Ashe Pashe Thakle (2023–2024)
- Uraan (2024–2025)

=== Acquired series ===
- Ramayan
- Mahaprabhu
- Oye Golu
- Sri Ramkrishna
- Super V

=== Reality shows ===
- 1000 Ghonta (2011)
- Ebar Jombe Moja (2019)
- Super Singer (2019–2023)

== Sister channels ==
=== Jalsha Movies ===
Jalsha Movies is a Bangla-language movie channel owned by Disney Star, a subsidiary of The Walt Disney Company India. Launched on 16 December 2012, it functions as the sister channel to its general entertainment counterpart Star Jalsha. The channel primarily broadcasts a wide array of Bengali films ranging from classic cinema to contemporary releases.

== Reception ==
Within its launch of 3 years, Star Jalsha became the most watched Indian Bengali-language channel in April 2011.
