= Bharat Kaul =

Indian television actor (born 1969)

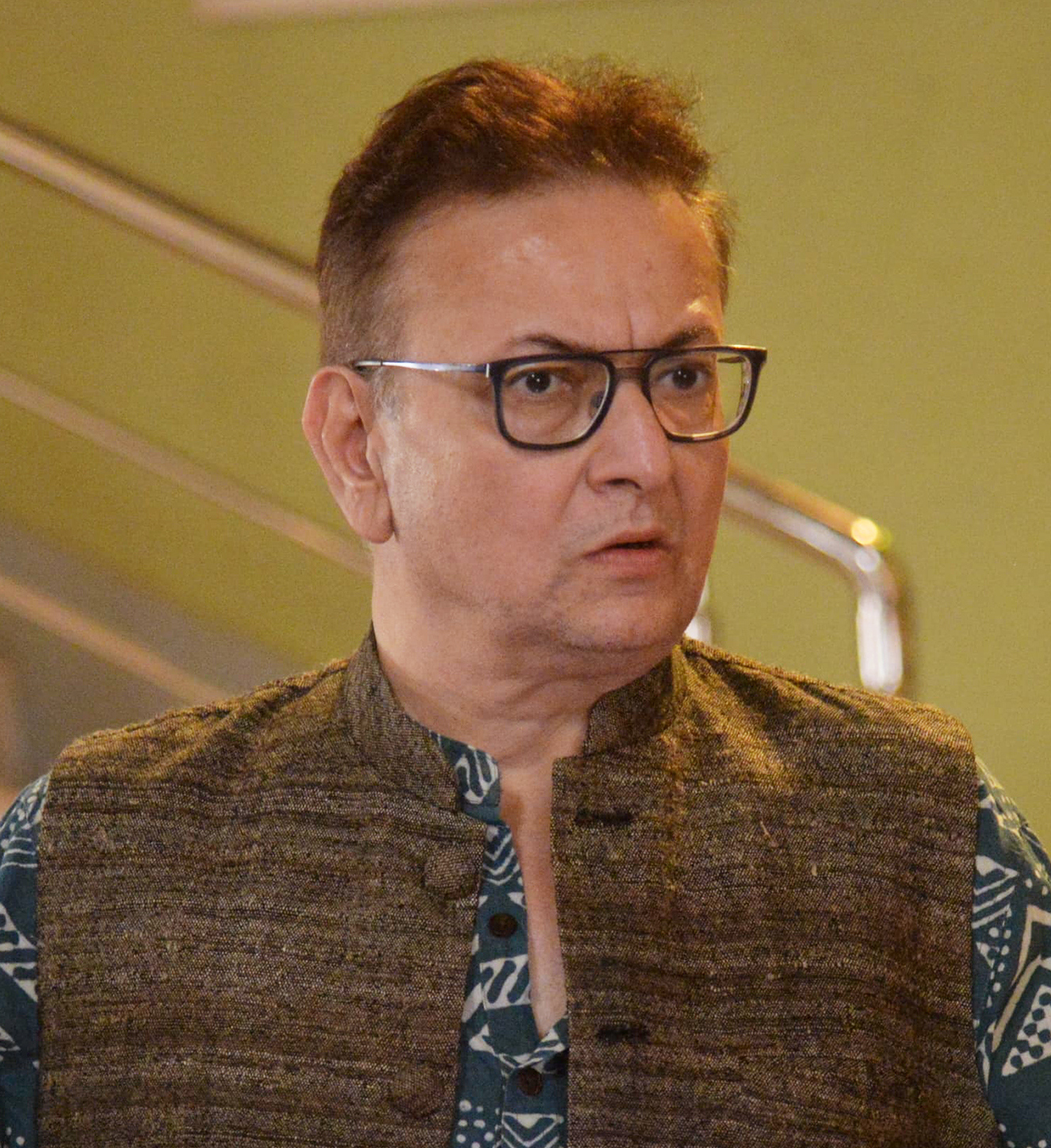
- Kaul in 2024
- Born: 28 July 1969 (age 57); Kashmir, India
- Occupation: Actor
- Years active: 1995–present
- Spouses: Anushree Das (m. 1996; div. 2003); Jayashree Mukherjee (m. 2015)
- Children: Arya Kaul (daughter) (born 2016)

Bharat Kaul is an Indian actor mainly known for villainous and antagonistic roles in Bengali films. He has also appeared in Hindi films. He is a Vice President of the "West Bengal Motion Picture Artists' Forum" along with Sabyasachi Chakrabarty, Aparajita Auddy, Kaushik Sen and Sumanta Mukherjee.

== Personal life ==
Bharat Kaul was first married to Anushree Das in 1996 but they got divorced in 2003. In 2015, he married Jayasree Mukherjee (born 1987) who is 18 years younger than him. Together, they have a daughter named Arya Kaul (born 2016).

== Filmography ==
Title	Year	Role	Director
Sasurbari Zindabad	2000	Rana	
Ektu Chhowa	2002		Dayal Acharya
Mr and Mrs Iyer	2002	Rajesh Arora	Aparna Sen
Swapno	2005	Jackie	Haranath Chakraborty
Chita	2005	Abhirup Thakur	T L V Prasad
Yuddho	2005	Ranjit Saha	Rabi Kinagi
Akai Aaksho	2006	Tapan	Rabi Ray
MLA Fatakeshto	2006	SP Durjoy Nag	Swapan Saha
I Love You	2007		Rabi Kinagi
Phoonk	2008	Mandar	Ram Gopal Verma
Aamras	2009		
Pankh	2010		Sudipto Chattopadhyay
Bolo Na Tumi Aamar	2010	Police Commissioner	Sujit Mondal
Josh	2010	Nikhil	Rabi Kinagi
Ami Shubhash Bolchi	2011	Gosaniya	Mahesh Manjrekar
Fighter	2011	Section Shankar	Rabi Kinagi
Paglu 2	2012	Badshah Khan	Sujit Mondal
Challenge 2	2012	Police Commissioner	Raja Chanda
Deewana	2013	Agnidev Roy	Rabi Kinnagi
Arundhati	2014		Sujit Mondal
Highway	2014		Sudipto Chattopadhyay
Khaad	2014		Kaushik Ganguly
Badshahi Angti	2014	Dr. Srivastav	Sandip Ray
Herogiri	2015	Bhavani Pathak	Rabi Kinnagi
Power	2016	Gobardhan	
Zulfiqar	2016	Parvez Maqsood	Srijit Mukherji
Jamai Badal	2019		
Naqaab	2018		
Vinci Da	2019	Shyam Sundar Jaiswal	Srijit Mukherji
Nayan Rahasya	2024		Sandip Ray

== Television ==
Year	Serial	Role	Channel
2007	Saat Phere – Saloni Ka Safar	Abhay Singh	Zee TV
2007–2008	Jiya Jale	Veerendra Bhimani	9X
2008–2009	Mata Ki Chowki	Sabhya Kumar	Sahara One
2010–2011	Maan Rahe Tera Pitaah	Chief engineer at Brahampur	Sony Entertainment Television
2011–2012	Dekha Ek Khwaab	Mr. Raichoudhury	Sony Entertainment Television
2014–2016	Rajjotok	Somnath	Zee Bangla
2015	Mon Niye Kachakachi	Rajesh Kapoor	Star Jalsha
2015–2016	Aponjon	Subhendu	Colors Bangla
2015–2017	Punyi Pukur	Barrister Debjit Banerjee	Star Jalsha
2016	Phoolmoni	Sunil Debroy	Zee Bangla
2016–2017	Ei Chheleta Bhelbheleta	Abinash Sen	Zee Bangla
2017	Gachkouto	Kushal	Colors Bangla
2017	Debipaksha	Shivaji Chowdhury	Star Jalsha
2017–2018	Kundo Phooler Mala	Aniruddha Sengupta	Star Jalsha
2017–2018	Jamai Raja	Ronodeb Chattopadhyay	Zee Bangla
2018–2019	Phagun Bou	Aniruddha "Ani" Ghosh	Star Jalsha
2018–2019	Pratidaan	Nisha & Shimul's Father	Star Jalsha
2019	Netaji	Andrew Henderson Leith Fraser	Zee Bangla
2019	Jiyon Kathi	Kushal Chatterjee	Sun Bangla
2019–2021	Sreemoyee	Upal Chakraborty	Star Jalsha
2020–2021	Kora Pakhi	Debdut Sinha	Star Jalsha
2021	Desher Maati	Dr. Bikramjit "Bikram" Mukherjee	Star Jalsha
2021–2022	Rishton Ka Manjha	Amitabh Agarwal	Zee TV
2021–2022	Mon Mane Na	Suryakanta Burman	Colors Bangla
2021–2022	Uma	Ambarish Acharya	Zee Bangla
2022	Laalkuthi	Debrup Dutta	Zee Bangla
2022–2023	Lokkhi Kakima Superstar	Somshankar Roy Chowdhury	Zee Bangla
2022-2024	Sohag Chand	Duryadhan Mondal	Colors Bangla
2023–2024	Jhanak	Bharat Raina	Star Plus
2023	Balijhor	Somudro Sen	Star Jalsha
2023	Geeta LL.B	Dhiman Sen	Star Jalsha
2024–2025	Roshnai	Deeptajeet Chatterjee (later replaced by Shankar Chakraborty)	Star Jalsha
2024–2026	Advocate Anjali Awasthi	Chandrabhan Thakur	Star Plus
2025–2026	Parashuram – Ajker Nayok	Jeet Mukherjee	Star Jalsha
2025–2026	Besh Korechi Prem Korechi		Zee Bangla
2026	Bigg Boss Bangla 3	Contestant (11th place)	Star Jalsha

== Awards ==
Year	Award	Category	Serial	Role
2015	Zee Bangla Sonar Sansar Award	Priyo Kholnayok	Rajjotok	Somnath
2016	Zee Bangla Sonar Sansar Award	Priyo Baba	Rajjotok	Somnath
