= Phoolmoni =

2016 Indian television series

- Genre: Drama; Comedy; Romance
- Created by: Debalay Bhattacharya; Vandana Films
- Written by: Kallol Lahiri; Pritikana Paul Roy
- Directed by: Monojit Majumdar
- Starring: Subhranshi; Bharat Kaul; Siddhartha Banerjee; Suranjana Roy
- Opening theme: Phoolmoni
- Composer: Indraadip Das Gupta
- Country of origin: India
- Original language: Bengali
- No. of episodes: 122

Production
- Producer: Shibaji Panja
- Production location: Kolkata
- Cinematography: Santu Dutta
- Camera setup: Multi-camera
- Running time: 22 minutes
- Production company: Vandana Films

Original release
- Network: Zee Bangla
- Release: 5 September 2016 – 14 January 2017

Phoolmoni is a Bengali television soap opera that premiered on 5 September 2016 and aired on Zee Bangla. The series replaced Premer Phaande. It was produced by Shibaji Panja and starred Subhranshi Suranjana Roy, Moumita Chakraborty, Rumpa Chatterjee and Anamika Chakraborty in main roles, with Siddhartha Banerjee, Bharat Kaul, Biswajit Chakraborty and Fahim Mirza in supporting roles.

== Plot ==
The story revolves around a childless woman named Madhabi, who is loved by her entire family. She is a responsible and committed housewife. However, she cannot conceive because her husband, Aditya, is impotent. She has strong motherly feelings for a child named Jharon, who is the adopted daughter of Batasi, a maid at Madhabi's house. Jahron comes to Madhabi's house on the day of Ganesh Puja. When Jharon goes to take some food, everyone perceives her as a thief, but Madhabi sees the innocence of the little girl who has simply come to eat. On the day of her sister-in-law's baby shower, she is shunned by her relatives, who treat her as if she is an ill omen for the unborn child. On the other hand, the news of her husband's impotency is covered up cleverly by her husband and he starts living with a woman named Anamika. Madhabi is vehemently accused of being a woman capable of harming the unborn baby. She is pushed to such a corner that she decides to leave the house she once called her own and commit suicide. She attempts suicide though survives and eventually finds refuge in the slums of a woman named Firoza, who was her beautician. Here, she comes across Irfan again, Madhabi remembers Irfan from the time he sang at the slum on Eid when Madhabi was invited by Firoza. Irfan is a lively boy, a krishore kanti, an energetic guy who helps Madhabi feel comfortable at the slum. Later, Madhabi helps save the slum when it was about to get demolished by the construction company where her husband works. After, Jharon's mother is convicted of murdering her drunkard husband, Madhabi adopts Jharon legally. Her family figures out that Madhabi is innocent and the report was forged. When the discussion of bringing Madhabi in the house arises, Madhabi decides to go back but the family doesn't want to accept Madhabi's adopted daughter, Jharon. She then takes on the struggle to establish the child’s identity as her daughter and give her the name of her husband and the family to which she belongs.

== Cast ==
- Kinni Modak as Phoolmoni
- Subhranshi as Jharon
- Samrat Mukherjee as Himadri Sanyal
- Siddhartha Banerjee as Aditya Debroy
- Anamika Chakraborty as Anamika
- Bharat Kaul as Sunil Debroy
- Piyali Mitra as Shipra Debroy
- Suranjana Roy as Aditya's Sister in law
- Moumita Chakraborty as Aditya's Aunt
- Rumpa Chatterjee as Aditya's Aunt
- Shaon Dey as Aditya's Aunt
- Biswajit Chakraborty as Aditya's Uncle
- Fahim Mirza as Amlan
- Elfina Mukherjee as Sonali
- Aditya Roy as Amit
- Bulbuli Panja as Feroza Khatun
- Abhijit Ghosh as Irfan
