= Naqab, Iran =

Naqab or Neqab (Persian: نقاب) may refer to:

- Naqab, North Khorasan
- Neqab, a city in Razavi Khorasan
- Neqab, Khalilabad, Razavi Khorasan Province
- Neqab, Khvaf, Razavi Khorasan Province
- Neqab, Mashhad, Razavi Khorasan Province
- Neqab, Nishapur, Razavi Khorasan Province
