= Anamika Chakraborty =

Bengali film and television actress

- Born: 25 March 1997 (age 29); Kolkata, India
- Citizenship: Indian
- Occupation: Actress
- Years active: 2014–present
- Notable work: Rajjotok; Ekhane Akash Neel
- Spouse: Uday Pratap Singh (m. 2023)

Anamika Chakraborty (born 25 March 1997) is an Indian television actress. She works in Bengali television, films and webseries. She is known for her performance in Rajjotok, Phoolmoni, Ekhane Akash Neel, Iskabon, Holy Faak and many others.

== Television ==
Year	Show	Role	Channel	Note
2014 - 2015	Rajjotok	Bonnie/Mou	Zee Bangla	Main female protagonist (later replaced by Mishmee Das), Antagonist (later)
2016 - 2017	Phoolmoni	Anamika	Zee Bangla	Main antagonist
2019 - 2020	Ekhane Akash Neel	Hiya	Star Jalsha	Main protagonist
2021	Beder Meye Jyotsna	Bangomi	Sun Bangla	Cameo
2021	Mahapeeth Tarapeeth	Korunamoyee	Star Jalsha	Cameo
2021	Jai Jagannath	Ekadashi	Colors Bangla	Cameo
2022	Uron Tubri	Nisha	Zee Bangla	Antagonist
2022	Laalkuthi	Jhilly / fake Jini	Zee Bangla	Supporting Role
2022- 2023	Phaguner Mohona	Oindrila	Sun Bangla	Antagonist
2024	Mithijhora	Koel	Zee Bangla	Antagonist
2025	Phulki	Ritu Roy	Zee Bangla	Supporting Role

== Films ==
- Love Letter
- Ekta Bhalobashar Golpo
- Aschhe Abar Shabor (2018)
- Tor opekkhay
- Adda (2019 film)
- Munni (Short film)
- Ishkabon (2022)
- Shohorer Ushnotomo Din E

== Webseries ==
- Holy Faak (Season 1)
- Holy Faak (Season 2)
- In a Relationship Phase 1 & 2
- Bhalobashabashi (short stories by SVF)
