= Shreema Bhattacherjee =

Indian actress (born 1997)

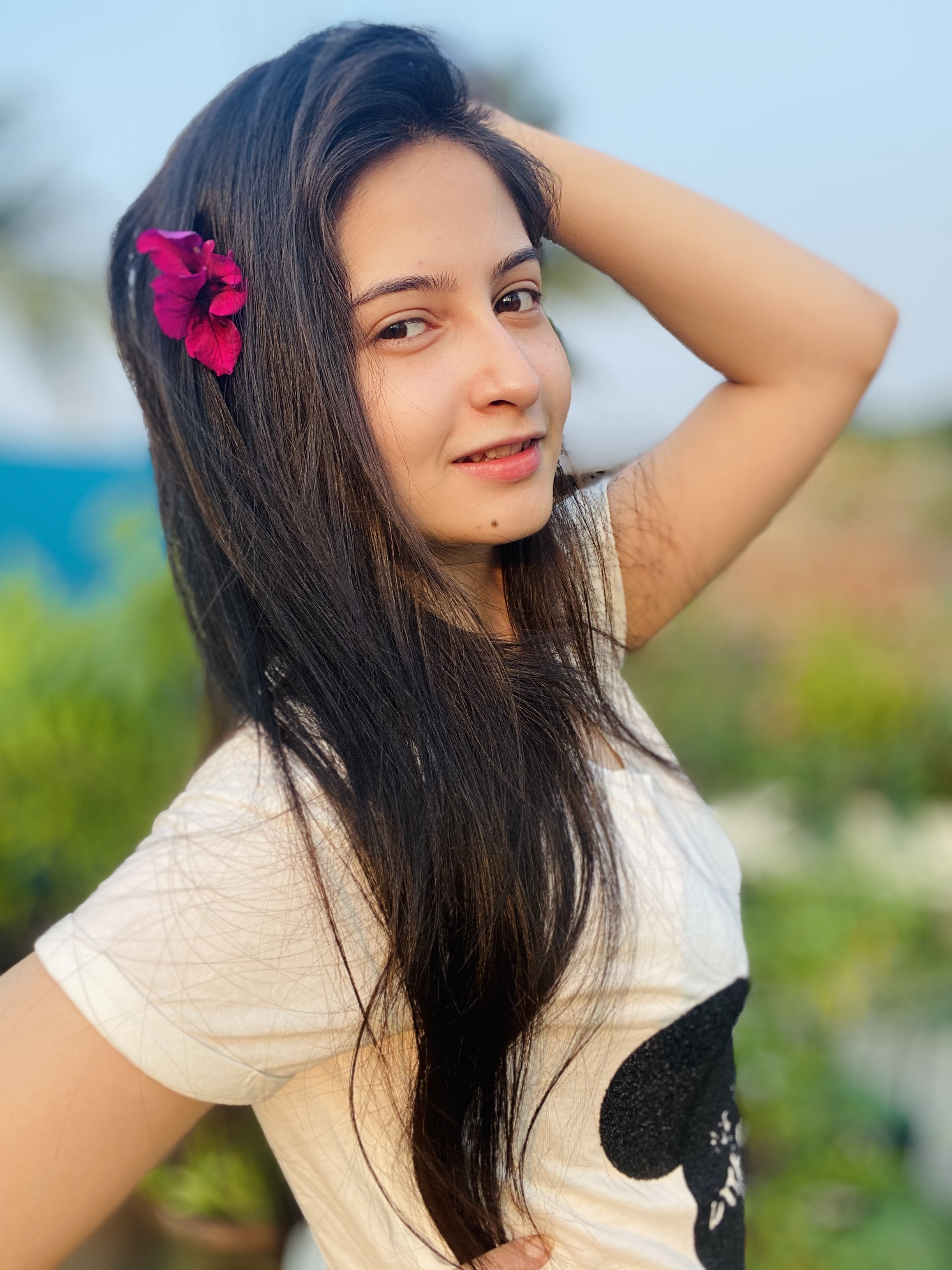
- Shreema in 2020
- Born: 26 February 1997 (age 29); Kolkata, West Bengal, India
- Education: Bagbazar Women's College
- Occupation: Actress
- Years active: 2016-present
- Partner: Gourab Roy Chowdhury (2020)

Shreema Bhattacherjee is an Indian Bengali actress who works in film and television. She made her television debut in the Colors Bangla series Nagleela (2016–2017). Bhattacherjee made her film debut with Abhimanyu Mukherjee's Teko (2019).

== Career ==
Shreema Bhattacherjee made her television debut in the Colors Bangla series Nagleela. She subsequently appeared in the Zee Bangla series Jamai Raja, in which she portrayed Nilasha Bannerjee, also known as Neel. Bhattacherjee made her film debut with the comedy film Teko, directed by Abhimanyu Mukherjee and released in November 2019.

== Television ==
- Naagleela
- Jamai Raja
- Mahaprabhu Shree Chaitanya
- Beder Meye Jyotsna
- Jay Jagannath
- Gaatchora
- Basu Paribar

== Filmography ==
- Teko
- Omor Shongi
- Promoter Boudi
- Bhootu Aaya Bhago

== Telefilm ==
- Mittir Parar Maradona
- Mon Kharaper Osudh

== Short films & web series ==
- Srikanto
- Zariyaa 2

== Mahalaya ==
- Nabarupe Mahadurga

== Reality show ==
- Agomoni Aradhona

== Music video ==
- Khachar Bhitor Achin Pakhi
- Tor Duchokhe
- Dugga Mai Ki Joy
- Ami Chaichi Tomay
- Tumi Hou Jodi
- Besh Toh Chilam Ami
- Moner Password
- Bor Elo
- Hoye Jaa Sudhu Amar
- Jab Se Mili Tu

== Awards and nominations ==
Year	Award	Category	Film/TV Show	Result
2020	Women Empowerment Award 2020		—N/a	Won
2021	Bengali Icon Award	Most Popular Face in Television	—N/a	Won
2021	Black Binodini Photography festival 2021	Photogenic Face of Bengal	She te Biporit	Won
2022	Social Star Awards 2022	Best Actress in TV Industry	—N/a	Won
2022	Bengali Icon Award	Best Actress	Gaatchora	Won
2023	Josh Creator Awards	Most Influential Creator (Gold)	—N/a	Won
2023	Tolly Cine Samman 2023	Best Parallel Lead Female	Gaatchora	Won
2023	TV9 Bangla Ghorer Bioscope Awards	Best Supporting Actress-TV Serial	Gaatchora	Nominated
2024	Serar Sera Somman 2024	Best Actress	Basu Paribar	Won
2025	Serar Sera Somman 2025	Most Versatile Actress	—N/a	Won
