= Teko =

Teko may refer to:

- Teko people, an Amerindian nation in French Guiana
  - Emerillon language, their language
- Tektitek language, a Mayan language spoken by the Tektitan people of Huehuetenango, Guatemala
- Teko (film), a 2019 Indian Bengali-language film
