= Mon Phagun =

2021 Indian television series

- Genre: Drama; Romance
- Developed by: Acropoliis Entertainment
- Screenplay by: Jyoti Hazra
- Story by: Snigdha Basu
- Directed by: Lakhan Ghosh; Soumen Haldar
- Creative directors: Abir & Proshen
- Starring: Sean Banerjee; Srijla Guha
- Theme music composer: Indradeep Dasgupta
- Country of origin: India
- Original language: Bengali
- No. of episodes: 386

Production
- Executive producers: Arnab; Samajita; Saptara; Shruti
- Producers: Snigdha Basu; Sani Ghosh Ray
- Cinematography: Animesh Gharui
- Editors: Nilanjan; Arunaditya
- Camera setup: Multi-camera
- Running time: 22 minutes
- Production company: Acropoliis Entertainment

Original release
- Network: Star Jalsha
- Release: 26 July 2021 – 21 August 2022

Mon Phagun is a 2021 Indian Bengali romantic drama television series which was released in July 2021 on Star Jalsha. The series is produced by Acropoliis Entertainment. It stars Sean Banerjee and Srijla Guha in the lead roles. It ended its telecast on 21 August 2022.

== Synopsis ==
Rishiraj and Priyadarshini are childhood friends, who fell in love with each other in their youth. They were separated after an accident where Priyadarshini lost her parents.

=== After 20 years ===
Priyadarshini has become a tourist guide under the name Pihu Mitra, while Rishiraj, now an industrialist, has renamed himself Rishi Sen. Rishi has adopted Pihu's elder sister, Sudorshini (now known as Rusha) as his own sister. Rishi and Pihu meet in North Bengal, but do not recognize each other. Rishi's family, however, takes an immediate liking to Pihu because of her kind heart and cheerful nature. Pihu's uncle, Anushka's father, becomes seriously ill, but the family cannot afford proper treatment. Around the same time, Pihu loses her job and is left helpless. Rusha offers Pihu a position in Rishi's office, though Rishi is adamantly opposed to employing women. Rusha eventually convinces him. Pihu gets the job and moves into Rishi's home.

Rusha's husband, Soumen, secretly plots to take over Rishi's business and property. He goes to a hotel to smuggle drugs for money, but Pihu catches him. When the media covers the incident, they falsely blame Pihu. To protect her, Rusha demands that Rishi marry Pihu. Rishi and Pihu are forcibly married, but privately agree on a contract stating that they will remain married for only six months. They travel to Bristibari, where Soumen hires goons to kill Rishi, but Pihu saves him. Gradually, Rishi and Pihu begin to trust each other and face numerous challenges together. Later, during a family picnic, Rittik and Soumi try to bring them closer by mixing alcohol into their drinks. While intoxicated, Rishi and Pihu reveal their true identities to each other, and the confession is recorded on Pihu's phone.

Back home, after several days of confusion, Pihu finally tells Rishi that he is her childhood love, Tubai Da. She becomes emotional and goes to his office to tell him she is Priyadarshini. However, before she can speak, Rishi's business partner arrives and demands that Rishi marry his daughter, Priyanka, who loves him. The partner threatens to reclaim all the money he invested, which would cost Rishi his home, business, and everything he owns. Rishi is torn, as he has developed feelings for Pihu. Pihu vows to arrange Rishi and Priyanka's marriage within a month. Priyanka moves into Rishi's home and tries to grow close to him, but he ignores her. Pihu and Rishi expose Soumen's schemes to the family, and Soumen is arrested. Rusha then discovers she is pregnant.

Time passes. Anushka and Rittik fall in love, but Anushka's father arranges her marriage to the son of a friend, who turns out to be a fraud. On the wedding day, Pihu and Rishi reveal the truth, and Anushka marries Rittik instead. On Valentine's Day, the family hosts a large party, where Rishi confesses his love for Pihu and proposes to her. Priyanka pressures the family to force a divorce between Rishi and Pihu. Pihu devises a plan: she signs fake documents instead of the divorce papers, but Rishi does not notice and misunderstands her actions. When the deadline to repay Priyanka's father arrives, the family cannot gather the required funds, and Rishi reluctantly prepares to marry Priyanka. Meanwhile, Pihu records Priyanka's incriminating phone call and blackmails her. She breaks into Priyanka's father's mansion to obtain evidence but is attacked and left unconscious in a bathtub full of water. Rishi, worried for Pihu, searches for her and saves her. With the evidence secured, the wedding is postponed. Distraught, Priyanka attempts suicide and is struck by a car driven by Rishi's grandmother and cousin Uday. Uday falls in love with Priyanka, and they marry that night.

At the wedding ceremony, Rusha's new friend Mayuk appears. Shortly afterward, Pihu leaves the house, hurt by Rishi's misunderstanding over the fake divorce papers. Rishi discovers they were not divorce papers at all and realizes his mistake. He accepts that Pihu is truly Priyadarshini. At the Holi festival, Rishi and Pihu finally confirm their identities to each other and reconcile. Monika Sur, Rishi's father's former assistant and Soumen's sister, returns and frees Soumen from jail. The Sen family prepares for Rishi and Pihu's grand wedding. However, on the wedding day, Rishi's mother returns with a woman claiming to be the real Priyadarshini—a woman who cared for Rishi for many years. Unaware of the deception, Rishi's mother believes her. The impostor is actually Monika Sur's daughter. She convinces the family she is genuine, and Rishi and Pihu's marriage is called off. Rishi again misunderstands Pihu.

Soon, the truth emerges: Pihu is the real Priyadarshini. Rishi and Pihu reunite. But Monika tells Pihu that Rishi's father murdered her parents and that Rishi concealed the truth. She gives Pihu a gun and urges her to kill Rishi. Devastated, Pihu confronts Rishi and attempts to take her own life. Soumen, shocked, shoots at Rishi, but the bullet grazes Pihu instead, and she collapses. Rishi saves her. It is then revealed that Rishi's father, Apritim Sen Sharma, is alive—and innocent. The true culprit was Monika. Rishi's uncle is injured in a bar incident, is mistakenly believed dead, and Rishi is accused and arrested, but Pihu saves him. All complications are resolved, the family reunites, and Rishi and Pihu remarry. Rusha also learns that Pihu is her long-lost sister.

Later, the son of Apritim and Monika returns, intending to kill Rishi and marry Pihu. Rishi, Pihu, Rittik, and Anushka go on a honeymoon arranged by their grandmother, but Rohan (Apritim and Monika's son) changes the destination and brings them to an abandoned house. There, Rohan kills Rishi and pushes him into a river. The family believes Rishi is dead. Four months pass. Pihu, now a renowned tourist guide, goes on a trip when her bus is stopped by goons. Their leader, Romio, looks exactly like Rishi. Shocked, Pihu escapes. Convinced there is a mystery, she searches the village but finds nothing. The Sen family pressures Pihu to marry Rohan. She refuses, and Rohan hires Romio to impersonate Rishi.

In the final confrontation, Rohan captures Pihu and Rusha, but Rishi—alive—rescues them. Pihu asks Romio whether he is truly her Tubai Da. Romio replies that whether he is or is not will not be revealed in this season. The next season.....never came, marking an abrupt end to the show.

== Cast ==
=== Main ===
- Sean Banerjee as Rishiraj Sen Sharma aka Rishi Sen/Tubai/Fake Romeo – an arrogant and ruthless business tycoon, owner of RS Enterprise; Pihu's childhood lover turned husband (2021 – 2022)
  - Swarnava Sanyal as young Rishiraj (2021)
- Srijla Guha as Priyadarshini Sen Sharma (née Mitra) aka Pihu – a cheerful girl and tourist guide; Rishiraj's childhood lover turned wife (2021 – 2022)
  - Preksha Saha as young Pihu (2021)

=== Recurring ===
- Geetashree Roy as Sudarshini Mitra aka Rusha Sen Sur – Pihu's elder sister; Rishi's adoptive sister; Soumen's wife (2021–2022)
- Prantik Banerjee as Soumen Sur – Rusha's husband, Shalini's ex-husband; Pihu and Rishi's former rival;was a smuggler by profession, Monica's biological brother (2021–2022)
- Rob Dey as Ritwik Sen Sharma – Rishi's cousin brother; Anushka's husband (2021 – 2022)
- Amrita Debnath as Anushka Sen Sharma (née Hazra) – Pihu's cousin sister; Ritwik's wife (2021 – 2022)
- Saswati Guha Thakurta as Pramila Sen Sharma – Rishiraj's grandmother; Apratim, Pratim and Rijula's mother (2021 – 2022)
- Kaushik Chakraborty as Apratim Sen Sharma – Rishiraj's estranged father (2022)
- Sohini Sanyal as Madhumanti Sen Sharma – Rishiraj's mother; Apratim's estranged wife (2022)
- Arijit Chowdhury as Pratim Sen Sharma – Apratim's younger brother; Rishi's paternal uncle; Soumi and Ritwik's father (2021 – 2022)
- Shreyasee Samanta as Malobika Sen Sharma – Soumi and Ritwik's mother (2021 – 2022)
- Ananya Sen as Soumi Sen Sharma – Ritwik's younger sister; Rishi's cousin sister (2021 – 2022)
- Ananya Sengupta as Rijula Roy (née Sen Sharma) – Rishi, Soumi and Ritwik's paternal aunt; Tanni and Bambi's mother (2021 – 2022)
- Neel Mukherjee as Somraj Roy – a chartered accountant; Rijula's husband; Tanni and Bambi's father (2021 – 2022)
- Arpita Sarkar as Tanisha Roy / Tanni – Rjula's daughter; Rishi, Soumi and Ritwik's youngest cousin sister (2021 – 2022)
- Gopa Nandy as Namita - Sen Sharma family's maid ()2021-2022)
- Mallika Majumdar as Mousumi Hazra – Pihu's maternal aunt; Anushka's mother (2021 – 2022)
- Biswanath Basu as Paritosh Hazra – Anushka's father (2021 – 2022)
- Mou Bhattacharjee as Minu Pisi – Anushka's paternal aunt (2021)
- Sam Bhattacharya as Rohan Sen Sharma – Monica's estranged son with Apratim, Rishi's rival (2022)
- Shaon Dey as Monica Sur – Apratim's PA and girlfriend; Soumen's elder sister and Rohan's mother (2022)
- Ankusree Maity as Niharika – Ritwik's business partner and one-sided lover (2022)
- Hritojeet Chatterjee as Dr. Mayukh – Ritwik's cousin, Rusha's love-interest (2022)
- Ritwick Purakait (2022) as Ashutosh- A lawyer, Soumi's love interest
- Oindrila Bose as Priyanka Roy Chowdhury Pri – Judhajit's daughter; Rishi's college friend (2022)
- Debraj Mukherjee as Judhajit Roy Chowdhury – Rishi's business partner; Monica's former peon (2022)
- Arunava Dey as Uday – Debabrata's paternal grandson, Priyanka's husband (2022)
- Aishi Bhattacharya as Mili – Fake Priyodorshini, niece of Monica, Pihu's rival (2022)
- Sayak Chakraborty as Sarthak – Mili's boyfriend (2022)
- Shyamashis Pahari as Ritwik's paternal uncle, Malobika's brother (2022)
- Sangita Ghosh as Shalini Sur – Soumen's first wife (2022)
- Debojit Sarkar as Ghoton – Soumen's sidekick (2021 – 2022)
- Aritram Mukherjee as Shobhon – Anushka's ex-fiancée; Soumen's crime partner (2022)
- Gora Dhar as Bhabesh Babu – Rishi's manager (2021 – 2022)
- Roshni Tanwi Bhattacharya as Netra-Romeo's childhood friend and lover (2022)
- Suvajit Kar as Bhima-Romeo's cousin brother and rival, who murdered him (2022)
- Rajasree Bhowmick as Romeo's mother (2022)
- Sandip Dey as Romeo's father aka Bhanu- head of Reshamdighi village (2022)
- Boni Mukherjee as Bhima's mother (2022)
- Arijita Mukhopadhyay as a police officer (2021)

=== Guest appearances ===
- Ankush Hazra as himself (14 February 2022)
- Lagnajita Chakraborty as herself (14 February 2022)
- Shovon Gangopadhyay as himself (14 February 2022)
- Koneenica Banerjee as Sohochori aka Soi from Aay Tobe Sohochori (14 February 2022)
- Arunima Haldar as Borfi from Aay Tobe Sohochori (14 February 2022)
- Deblina Chatterjee as herself (14 February 2022)

== Dubbed versions ==
It has been dubbed in Hindi by the name Do Dil Mil Rahe Hain and telecasted on StarPlus since 12 June 2023.

== Reception ==
Initially, the show did not feature in the top slots of the TRP leaderboard after its debut and was placed on an average rating on Bengali television for the first five months of its airing. Gradually, however, the show increased in its TRP ratings to ultimately reach 2nd highest rating on television, and was one of the most popular shows on Star Jalsha for a long time. But, its trp rating points dropped in late April and led to the end of the show.

=== TRP Ratings ===
Week	Year	BARC Viewership		Ref.
Week	Year	TRP	Rank	Ref.
Week 35	2021	6.7	9	
Week 37	2021	7.0	7	
Week 38	2021	6.9	6	
Week 39	2021	6.7	7	
Week 40	2021	7.1	5	
Week 41	2021	6.1	8	
Week 42	2021	7.2	6	
Week 43	2021	7.0	7	
Week 44	2021	6.6	7	
Week 45	2021	6.9	7	
Week 46	2021	6.6	10	
Week 47	2021	7.0	8	
Week 48	2021	7.5	5	
Week 49	2021	7.9	5	
Week 50	2021	7.8	6	
Week 51	2021	8.0	6	
Week 52	2021	8.1	7	
Week 1	2022	8.6	5	
Week 2	2022	8.1	6	
Week 3	2022	9.5	2	
Week 4	2022	9.5	2	
Week 5	2022	9.7	3	
Week 6	2022	9.6	2	
Week 7	2022	9.4	2	
Week 8	2022	8.1	6	
Week 9	2022	8.1	6	
Week 10	2022	9.2	2	
Week 11	2022	8.5	4	
Week 12	2022	8.2	6	
Week 13	2022	6.9	8	
Week 14	2022	6.6	10	
Week 15	2022	5.9	8	
Week 16	2022	6.8	6	
Week 17	2022	6.8	5	
Week 18	2022	6.1	7	
Week 19	2022	6.6	6	
Week 20	2022	6.6	7	
Week 21	2022	6.9	6	
Week 22	2022	7.6	3	
Week 23	2022	7.0	4	
Week 24	2022	6.6	5	
Week 25	2022	7.0	7	
Week 26	2022	7.2	6	
Week 27	2022	6.1	6	
Week 29	2022	6.3	6	
Week 30	2022	5.9	8	
Week 31	2022	6.0	7	
Week 32	2022	6.4	8	
Week 33	2022	6.3	8	

== Production ==
The shooting again began in the month of June 2021 after the relaxation of the COVID-19 lockdown in West Bengal.
