= Kamalika Banerjee =

Indian actress

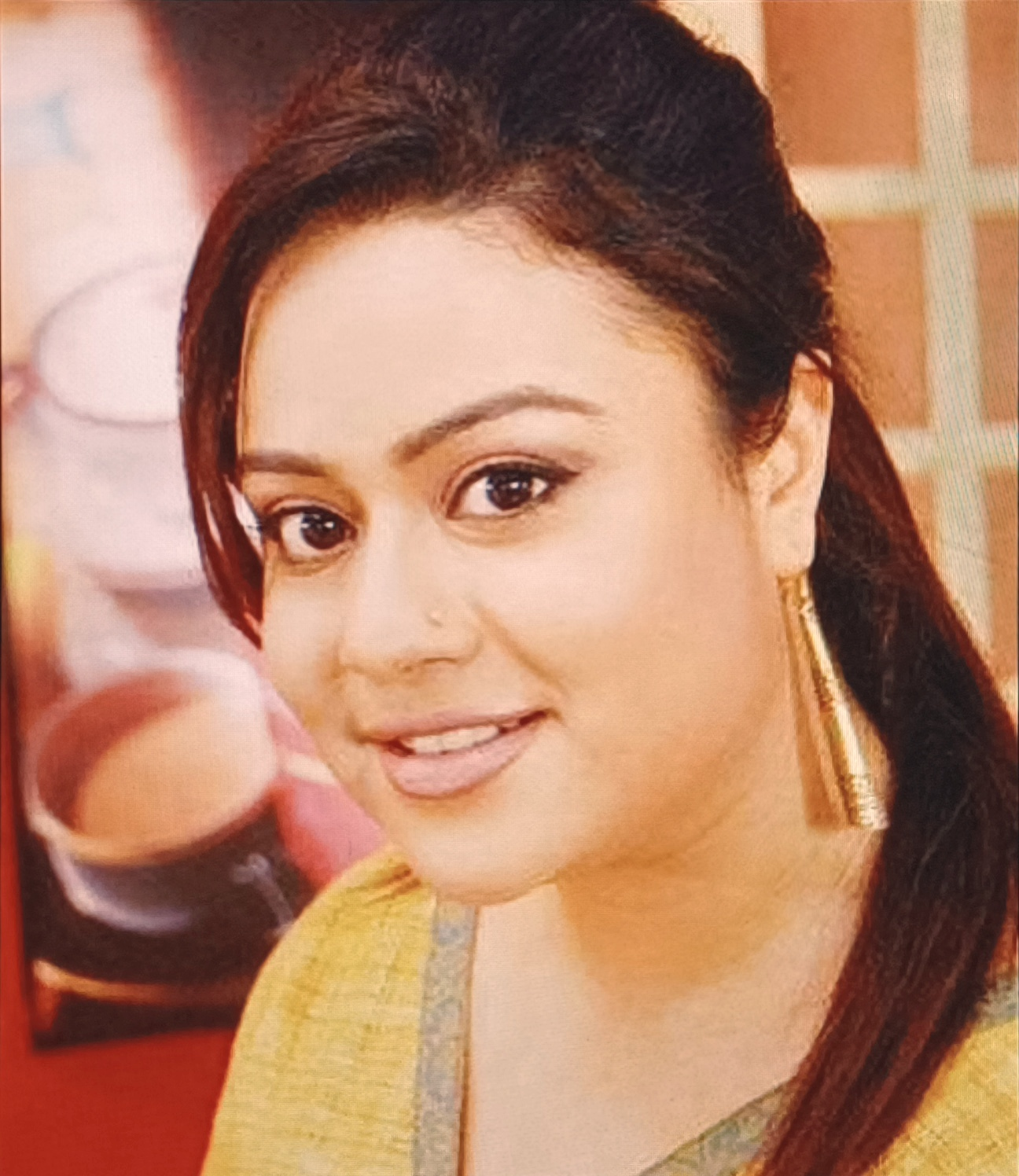
- Born: 21 July 1978 (age 48); Kolkata
- Other name: Kamalika Bandyopadhyay
- Occupations: Actress, model

Kamalika Banerjee (21 July 1978) also known as Kamalika Bandyopadhyay, is an Indian actress in Bengali language film and television.

== Works ==
=== Films ===
Year	Film	Character
2020	Mayar Jonjal	Lady of the house
2017	Bibaho Diaries	The Bengali soap addicted sister
2017	Bisarjan	
2017	Meri Pyaari Bindu	Boobi Mashi
2015	Kolkatar Raja	
2015	Herogiri	Maria's Mother
2014	Aamar Aami	Neelanjana, Chandrima's mother
2013	Ashchorjyo Prodeep	Nupur
2013	Hawa Bodol	Music company's owner's wife
2012	Awara	Madan Mohan's wife
2012	Abosheshey	Receptionist
2012	Chupkatha	
2011	Nondinee	
2010	Bou Bou Khela	
2010	Autograph	
2010	Natabar Notout	Manjula
2010	Wanted	
2010	Gandu	Mother of Saneesh / Gandu
2009	Cross Connection	Mala
2008	Bhalobasa Bhalobasa	
2007	Tolly Lights	
2007	I Love You	Mona's mother

=== Television ===
- Checkmate as Dr. Banalata Sen
- Ekhane Aakash Neel as Basabdatta
- Behula on Star Jalsha as Sumitra Behula's mother
- Chokher Tara Tui as Jaya / Payel
- Ishti Kutum as Sharmila
- Rajjotok as Sumi
- Japani Toy as Minister Wife
- Uma as Uma
- Ek Akasher Niche as Gayatri/Chhutki
- Agnipariksha as Jayanti
- Basanta Bilas Messbari
- Umar Shongshar as Uma
- Neel Seemana as Nadia
- Roshnai as Sudarshana
- Chirosokha as Parvati
