= Bodhisattwor Bodhbuddhi =

Indian Bengali-language comedy and child drama

- Genre: Drama; Comedy
- Written by: Anurag-Arijit
- Directed by: Subhendu Chakraborty
- Creative director: Shubhankar Chattopadhyay
- Starring: Ryan Guhaneogi; Anumegha Kahali; Sonali Chowdhury; Biswanath Basu; Samata Das
- Theme music composer: Upal Sengupta, Upali Chattopadhyay
- Country of origin: India
- Original language: Bengali
- No. of seasons: 1
- No. of episodes: 130

Production
- Executive producer: Rana Mukherjee
- Producers: Surinder Singh; Nispal Singh; Shubhankar Chattopadhyay
- Production location: Kolkata
- Cinematography: Subrata Mullick
- Editor: Subhajit- Dipon
- Camera setup: Multi camera
- Running time: 22 minutes
- Production company: Surinder Films

Original release
- Network: Zee Bangla
- Release: 4 July – 30 December 2022

Bodhisattwor Bodhbuddhi is an Indian Bengali language comedy drama television series which was broadcast on the Bengali general entertainment channel Zee Bangla from 4 July 2022 and is available on the digital platform ZEE5. It stars Ryan Guhaneogi as titular character 'Bodhisattwo' and Sonali Chowdhury, Biswanath Basu, Saurav Chakraborty, Sumanta Mukherjee, Samata Das in prominent supporting roles.

== Plot ==
The story revolves around a little boy named Bodhi, his lifestyle and family. A child prodigy, he is blunt and unempathetic. His interactions with his family results in hilarious situations but his brilliance gets him rusticated from his school. Then he is admitted to a new school with triple promotion.

== Cast ==
- Ryan Guhaneogi as Bodhisattwo Mukherjee aka Bodhi: Deepali and Pramatha's son, Munni's elder brother, Babui's younger brother.
- Anumegha Kahali as Basabdatta Mukherjee aka Munni: Deepali and Pramatha's daughter, Bodhi's sister.
- Mayukh Mishra as Suddhosattwo Mukherjee aka Babui: Munni and Bodhi's cousin brother; Paritosh and Kalpana's son.
- Sonali Chowdhury as Deepali Mukherjee: Munni and Bodhi's mother; Pramatha's wife.
- Biswanath Basu as Pramathanath Mukherjee: Munni and Bodhi's father; Deepali's husband.
- Samata Das as Kalpana Mukherjee: Babui's mother; Paritosh's wife; Munni and Bodhi's aunt.
- Sourav Chakraborty as Paritosh Mukherjee: Munni and Bodhi's uncle; Babui's father; Kalpana's husband; Pramatha's younger brother.
- Sumanta Mukherjee as Amritolal Mukherjee a.k.a. Bhalodadu: Babui, Munni, Bodhi's paternal granduncle; Protima, Pramatha, Paritosh's paternal uncle.
- Chhanda Karanji Chattopadhyay as Kunjobala Mukherjee: Babui, Munni, Bodhi's paternal grandmother; Devi and Sentu's maternal grandmother; Protima, Pramatha, Paritosh's mother; Deepali and Kalpana's mother-in-law.
- Soume Chatterjee as Devi Hazra: Protima's daughter; Babui, Bodhi and Munni's paternal cousin sister.
- Sudipa Basu as Leelabati Ray: Bodhi, Munni's maternal grandmother; Deepali's mother; Pramatha's mother-in-law.
- Sarbari Mukherjee as Protima Hazra: Babui, Munni, Bodhi's paternal aunt; Devi's mother; Pramatha and Paritosh's elder sister.
- Arannyo Roy Chowdhury as Sayantan Hazra a.k.a. Sentu: Protima's son; Devi's brother; Bodhi's cousin.
- Ayanna Chatterjee as Sreejita: Bodhi's classmate.
- Partha Sarathi Deb as Headmaster of Bodhi's previous school.
- Sanghasri Sinha Mitra as Uttara Mukherjee: A history teacher.
- Krishnakishore Mukherjee as Sreekumar Chatterjee: Headmaster of Bodhi's present school.
- Monika Dey as Swati Roy: English teacher.
- Nayana Palit Bandyopadhyay as Sreejita's mother.
- Vicky Nandy as Bottle.
- Sankar Debnath as Potas.
- Sumit Samaddar as club secretary.
- Aniket Chakraborty as Saptarsi: Devi's lover.
- Chaitali Chakraborty as Sulochana Mukherjee a.k.a. Sulu a.k.a. "Electrica Maa": A fraud; Bhalodadu aka Amritolal's paternal cousin sister; Bodhi's paternal grandaunt.

== Reception ==
The Times of India quoted, "In Bengali television, which is still dominated by saas-bahu sagas, Bodhisattwor Bodhbuddhi is likely to bring a breath of fresh air."
