= Rajjotok =

Indian Bengali television series

- Genre: Drama; Romance
- Created by: Surinder Films
- Screenplay by: Malova Majumdar
- Story by: Aditi Majumdar; Anuja Chatterjee
- Directed by: Anup Chakraborty
- Starring: Anamika Chakraborty; Mishmee Das; Biswajit Ghosh; Riju Biswas
- Country of origin: India
- Original language: Bengali
- No. of seasons: 1
- No. of episodes: 622

Production
- Producers: Surinder Singh; Nispal Singh
- Production location: Kolkata
- Running time: 22 minutes
- Production company: Surinder Films

Original release
- Network: Zee Bangla
- Release: 7 April 2014 – 26 March 2016

Related
- Agnipariksha; Ei Chheleta Bhelbheleta

Rajjotok was a Bengali television soap opera that premiered on April 7, 2014, and aired on Zee Bangla. It was produced by Surinder Films. It starred Anamika Chakraborty, Mishmee Das as the main female protagonist and Biswajit Ghosh as the main male protagonist. Popular actor Riju Biswas played the role of the main antagonist, [Soham Choudhury], a performance that was noted by [critics]

== Plot summary ==
Rajjotok (meaning "perfect match") is a coming-of-age story of a cheerful filmy girl called Bonnie. She is the protagonist of the show, and a unique character. She has always been so strongly influenced by films that she equates her real life situations with a film. In her search for her hero, she ends up marrying the poor simpleton Shekhar who turns out to be completely contrary to any filmy hero that she had ever dreamt of. Her life suddenly becomes unlike any movie she has ever seen or heard.

== Cast ==
- Anamika Chakraborty as
  - Bonnie a.k.a. Bornita (before plastic surgery)
  - Mou a.k.a. Moumita - Bonnie's identical twin sister
- Mishmee Das as Bonnie a.k.a. Bornita (after plastic surgery)
- Biswajit Ghosh as Shekhar
- Bharat Kaul as father of Bonnie & Mou
- Piyali Mitra as mother of Bonnie & Mou
- Subhadra Mukherjee as Shekhar's mother
- Kamalika Banerjee as paternal aunt of Bonnie & Mou
- Kushal Chakraborty as Dr. Animesh
- Jayashree Mukherjee Kaul
- Anindita Saha Kapileshwari as Boni's aunt
- Somjita Bhattacharya
- Pushpita Mukherjee
- Prarona Bhattacharya
- Arpita Mukherjee
- Suvajit Kar
- Pradip Dhar
- Riju Biswas as Soham
- Tramila Bhattacharya as Soham's mother
- Suranjana Roy as Parul
