= Jamai Raja (2017 TV series) =

Bengali-language television Romance-Comedy-Drama soap opera

- Official poster of Jamai Raja
- Genre: Drama; Romance; Comedy; Detective
- Created by: Surinder Films
- Written by: N.K. Salil
- Directed by: Babu Banik
- Starring: Arjun Chakrabarty; Shreema Bhattacherjee; Chaiti Ghoshal
- Opening theme: Jamai Raja by Sayam Paul
- Composer: Jeet Ganguly
- Country of origin: India
- Original language: Bengali
- No. of episodes: 345

Production
- Producers: Surinder Singh; Nispal Singh
- Production location: Kolkata
- Production company: Surinder Films

Original release
- Network: Zee Bangla
- Release: 5 June 2017 – 12 August 2018

Related
- Jamai Raja

Jamai Raja is an Indian Bengali-language television Comedy soap opera that premiered on 5 June 2017, and airs on Bengali Zee Bangla. It stars Arjun Chakrabarty and Shreema Bhattacherjee in lead roles, and Chaiti Ghoshal as the main antagonist. It's an official remake of Hindi TV serial Jamai Raja.

== Plot ==
=== Before Marriage ===
The story follows Ishan Chatterjee, a wealthy businessman who returns to India after completing his studies abroad. He meets Nilasha, an NGO worker, and gradually falls in love with her. To win her affection without being influenced by her wealthy family, Ishan hides his true identity and pretends to be a middle-class man. Nilasha eventually falls in love with him as well.

Nilasha's mother, BB, opposes their relationship and repeatedly tries to separate them. She arranges Nilasha's marriage with Abhishek and later creates misunderstandings by falsely accusing Ishan's family of demanding dowry. Nilasha initially believes her mother's claims and breaks off her engagement with Ishan, but eventually discovers BB's conspiracies and learns the truth about Ishan's identity.

Nilasha apologizes to Ishan and his family, and the couple reunites. Despite BB and Abhishek's continued attempts to prevent their marriage, Ishan and Nilasha remain determined to be together. On their wedding day, Abhishek kidnaps Ishan and BB falsely claims that he has fled. Ishan escapes, defeats Abhishek and his accomplices, and reaches the wedding venue in time. Ishan and Nilasha finally marry, overcoming all the obstacles created by BB and Abhishek.

=== After Marriage ===
After their wedding, Ishan and Nilasha face opposition from BB, who refuses to accept their marriage and falsely implicates Ishan in an attempted murder case. She later secures his release by bribing the police and forces him to live as a son-in-law in her household. BB repeatedly tries to create misunderstandings between the couple, particularly after Preeti joins her office.

Meanwhile, Nilasha becomes the target of Rohan Roy, who develops an obsession with her and blackmails her using compromising photographs after forcibly kissing her. His actions, combined with BB’s schemes and misunderstandings involving Preeti, create a rift between Ishan and Nilasha. During Durga Puja, Rohan continues to threaten Nilasha, eventually driving her to attempt suicide. Preeti saves her and reveals the truth to Ishan.

Ishan confronts Rohan and exposes his harassment. Nilasha finally tells the family everything, leading to Rohan being thrown out and the couple reconciling. However, BB again accuses Ishan of having an affair with Preeti. Nilasha exposes the truth that Preeti is actually Mintu’s legally married wife and that Ishan had only been helping Mintu. The misunderstanding is cleared, while BB is left humiliated.

=== Mintu & Preeti's Weeding ===
BB orders Preeti and Mintu to leave the house, but Nilasha lets them stay as guests. Ishan and Nilasha help them get married despite BB’s opposition and attempts to stop the wedding. Furious after their marriage, BB fires them and orders them to vacate the house. Ranadev and Aparna then give Preeti and Mintu shelter in their home.

=== Abduction of Nilasha & Visit to BB's ancestral home ===
The story follows Ishan and Nilasha, whose relationship is repeatedly tested by Nilasha’s controlling mother, BB, and the scheming Abhishek. After Nilasha is kidnapped, Ishan is falsely accused of being involved. Abhishek exploits the situation to deceive BB and take control of her property, but Ishan repeatedly exposes his schemes and eventually helps restore BB’s property.

After being forced to leave their home, the family moves to BB’s ancestral village, where Ishan and Nilasha grow closer despite continued conflicts with BB and the villagers. Abhishek later attempts to eliminate Ishan and shoots him, but Ishan survives by using a steel plate to deflect the bullet. With the help of Sudip and the villagers, he exposes Abhishek’s crimes and forces him to return BB’s property.

Realizing Ishan’s loyalty and courage, BB finally accepts him as her son-in-law and reconciles with Ishan and Nilasha.

=== Ishan & Nilasha's second marriage ===
Ishan and Nilasha’s relationship faces another crisis when Abhishek exposes Ishan’s true identity on their wedding day, leaving Nilasha heartbroken. After Ishan suffers an accident, Nilasha seeks a divorce, but Ishan refuses and takes the matter to court. The court orders them to live together for three months. During this period, Nilasha unknowingly joins Ishan’s company, where he is her boss. Their frequent interactions gradually bring back their playful chemistry, culminating in Nilasha willingly dancing with Ishan at a Valentine’s Day celebration.

=== Conclusion ===
The story follows Ishan, whose life changes dramatically after his father, Randev Chatterjee, is arrested following the collapse of a bridge being constructed by the Chatterjee and Chatterjee Group. To arrange his father's bail, Ishan auctions the family home. Bibi buys the house and later allows the family to continue living there. Ishan takes up a job as a mechanic to support his family.

Ishan later receives an offer to host a television show. He accepts it and becomes an overnight sensation, appearing in disguise so that his identity remains hidden. When Nilasha's divorce case is reopened three months later, she refuses to divorce Ishan. Around the same time, Bibi apologizes to Ishan and leaves. The family eventually discovers that the mysterious television personality is actually Ishan. Although Ishan quits the show, people continue approaching him for help with their personal problems.

Ishan's ability to solve difficult situations brings him into contact with IPS officer Damini Sen. After helping her solve the mystery of a supposedly haunted house, he begins assisting her with various police investigations. During one investigation, Ishan discovers a connection between the case and the collapse of his family's company. He secretly investigates the matter with Nilasha, Bibi and Shubhamoy and eventually exposes those responsible for the company's downfall, ensuring that they are punished.

After helping a missing child reunite with his parents, Ishan decides to stop solving cases. However, Bibi asks him to investigate an incident involving a prominent Kolkata actress. Ishan takes up the case and uncovers the truth, bringing the story to its conclusion.

== Reception ==
Arjun Chakrabarty made his return to television after a long time through the Zee Bangla TV series Jamai Raja. He was paired opposite Shreema Bhattacherjee, and their on-screen chemistry was well received by viewers. Their characters gained considerable popularity, which was reflected in the TRP ratings that week. According to 15+ Urban TRP data, Jamai Raja managed to impact the viewership of Star Jalsha’s Rakhi Bandhan in the 10 PM slot. Within a week, Rakhi Bandhan's TRP rating dropped from 7.4 to 4.4, while Jamai Raja achieved a rating of 4 in its debut week. The show went on to become one of the top-rated programs during its run.

== Cast ==
=== Main ===
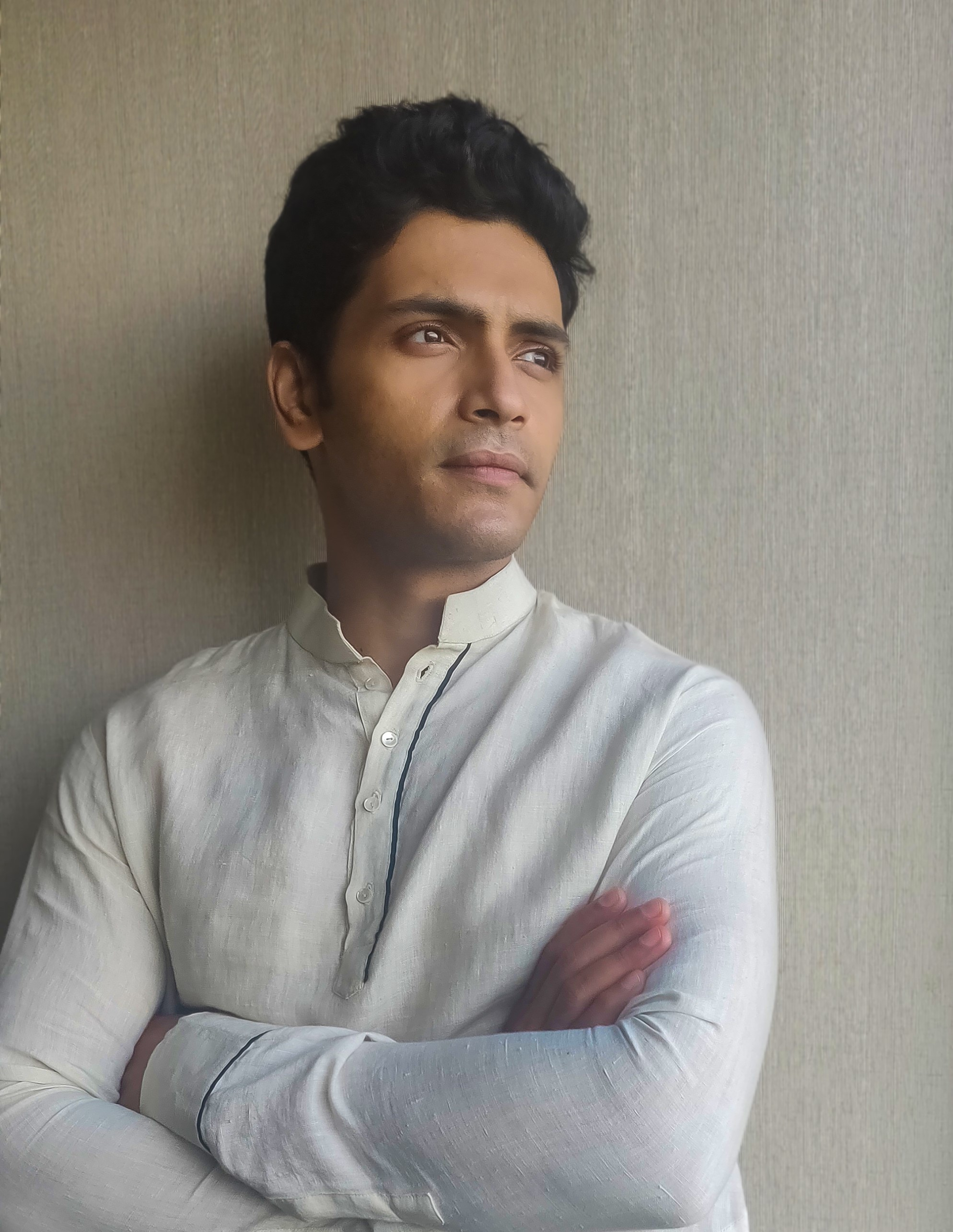
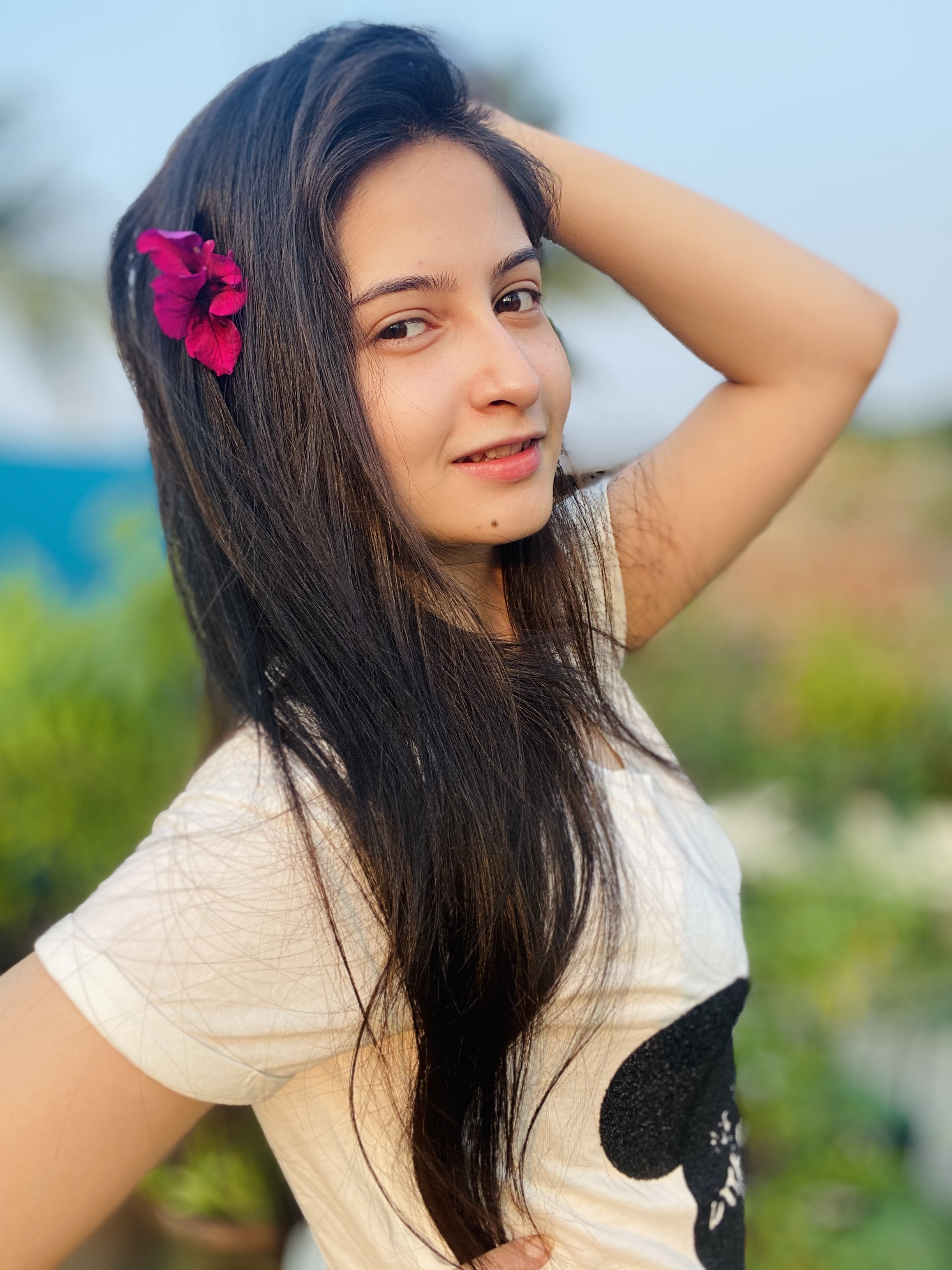
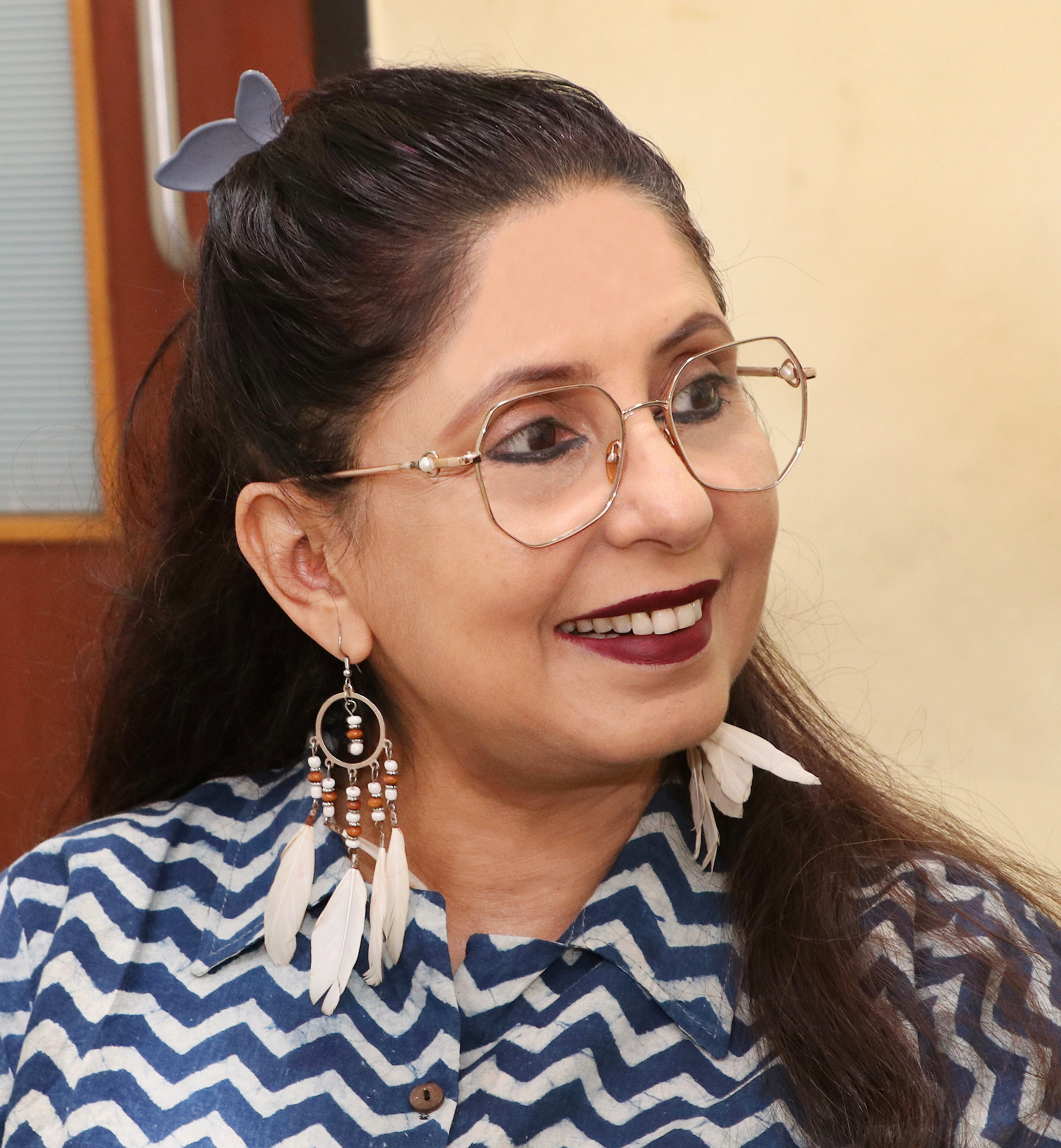
Top row: Arjun Chakrabarty, Shreema Bhattacherjee, Chaiti Ghoshal.
Bottom row: Chaiti Ghoshal, Shreema Bhattacherjee, Arjun Chakrabarty.
- Arjun Chakrabarty as Ishan Chatterjee
  - An Industrialist; Chairperson of Chatterjee & Chatterjee Group; Son of Industrialist Ranadev Chatterjee & Aparna Chatterjee, Husband of Nilasha Banerjee & Son-in-law of Style Icon & Fashion Designer BB
- Shreema Bhattacherjee as Nilasha Banerjee aka Neel
  - Daughter of Style Icon and Fashion Designer BB & Wife of Industrialist Ishan Chatterjee
- Chaiti Ghoshal as Basabdatta Banerjee aka BB
  - Style Icon & Fashion Designer; Mother of Nilasha Banerjee & Mother-in-law of Industrialist Ishan Chatterjee
- Geetashree Roy as IPS Damini Sen

=== Recurring ===
- Bharat Kaul as Ranadev Chatterjee
  - An Industrialist; Father of Industrialist Ishan Chatterjee, Husband of Aparna Chatterjee & Father-in-law of Nilasha Banerjee
- Moyna Mukherjee as Aparna Chatterjee
  - Mother of Industrialist Ishan Chatterjee, Wife of Industrialist Ranadev Chatterjee & Mother-in-law of Nilasha Banerjee
- Alokananda Roy as Madhobi Banerjee
  - Mother of Style Icon & Fashion Designer BB & Grandma of Nilasha Banerjee
- Sumit Samaddar as Shuvomoy Banerjee
  - Brother of Style Icon & Fashion Designer BB & Husband of Labango
- Sayantani Sengupta as Labango Banerjee
  - Wife of Shuvomoy
- Riyanka Dasgupta as Preeti
  - Wife of Mintu
- Uday Pratap Singh as Abhishek Jalan
  - An Businessman; Son of Businessman Jagmohon Jalan & the business partner of Style Icon & Fashion Designer BB
- Prriyam Chakraborty as Megha
- Manali Dey as Paromita
- Aditya Roy as Alokesh
- Kaushik Banerjee as Alokesh's father
- Mou Bhattacharya as Alokesh's mother
- Elfina Mukherjee as Alokesh's sister
- Prapti Chatterjee as Antara
- Shiddharta Banerjee as Indroneel
- Kaushambi Chakrabarty as Mohini
- Lovely Maitra as Riya
- Raj Bhattacharya as Raj
- Debolina Dutta as Purba Dutta
- Solanki Roy as Tania Sen

== Adaptations ==
Language	Title	Original release	Network(s)	Last aired	Notes
Hindi	Jamai Raja जमाई राजा	4 August 2014	Zee TV	3 March 2017	Original
Bengali	Jamai Raja জামাই রাজা	5 June 2017	Zee Bangla	12 August 2018	Remake
Punjabi	Jawai Ji ਜਵਾਈ ਜੀ	28 October 2024	Zee Punjabi	31 May 2025	Remake
