= Ekhane Aakash Neel (2008 TV series) =

Indian Bengali television series

- Ekhane Aakash Neel poster
- Genre: Drama; Romance
- Written by: Anuja Chatterjee; Aditi Majumdar; Joy Mukherjee; Kaushik Bhattacharya; Joydeep Mukherjee; Sayantani Majumdar Nambiar; Joy Dasgupta
- Directed by: Anindo Banerjee; Joydeep Mukherjee
- Starring: Aparajita Ghosh Das; Rishi Kaushik
- Opening theme: Ekhane Aakash Neel by Monali Thakur
- Composer: Jeet Gannguli
- Country of origin: India
- Original language: Bengali
- No. of episodes: 483

Production
- Executive producers: Indrani Mukherjee; Nispal Singh; Aratrika Bhoumik
- Producers: Aniruddho Roychoudhury; Jit Banerjee
- Production locations: Kolkata, West Bengal, India
- Camera setup: Premendu Bikash Chaki; Bapi Seth; Suman Kumar Das
- Running time: 22 minutes
- Production company: Screenplay Films

Original release
- Network: Star Jalsha
- Release: 8 September 2008 – 29 May 2010

Related
- Sanjivani (2002 TV series); Ekhane Aakash Neel (2019 TV series)

Ekhane Aakash Neel is a Bengali medical romantic drama series which aired on Star Jalsha. It was the remake of StarPlus Sanjivani. The serial is set in a nursing home, and is themed on the love between Dr. Ujaan Chatterjee, a respected and talented young doctor, and Hiya, a free-spirited girl who is the central heroine of the drama. In 2019, a reboot version Ekhane Aakash Neel (2019 TV series) premiered on Star Jalsha.

== Plot ==
The male protagonist Dr. Ujan Chatterjee, a cardiologist by profession who lost his best friend and mentor, his mother when he was barely a boy and grew into an egotistic, rude, solitary man who preferred to remain cocooned in his own world, welcomed solitude to the point of extremity that he shunned out his own father and considered him an intruder. After successful completion of his medical studies in UK, he returned home and joined the 'Tulip' Nursing Home in Kolkata where once his father Dr. Amolendu Chatterjee- the renowned neurologist, used to work and was one of the pillars of its growth. After passing away of Dr. Richard O'Brien, the founder of the Nursing Home, his wife, Elina took over the responsibilities of running 'Tulip' and subsequently handed over charge of Tulip to her competent and efficient doctor-duo Dr. Moynak and Dr. Shomoresh Ganguly and moved to the hills.

Ujan joined Tulip and came to be known as one of the best surgeons of Kolkata. The nursing home was small; its facilities were limited; but it was one of the most reliable places in the city because of its dedicated staff and professionally advanced doctors. One day, in one of his solitary jaunts, to be with himself, Ujan went to Kurseong where, he saved a person's life by giving him timely medical treatment. The news spread in that sleepy little hill station. The priest of the local Church was Friend-Philosopher-Guide to Elina and in search of a Doctor, he heard of Ujan's feat and took him to Elina who had suddenly fallen seriously ill.

Ujan decided to shift Elina to Tulip as he found her in a pretty bad physical condition and in need of an immediate and complicated surgery—neither the patient nor the young Doctor realized that they and their families knew each other for years. Elina had two daughters: her biological daughter, Annie and her adopted daughter, Hiya. Ujan first sighted Hiya in Kurseong when she was running in the hills with her kid friends and incidentally singing his mother's song. They had a tiff later when Hiya's gang of buddies were taking a feel of Ujan's Binocular and as usual, he did not like that. What attracted Ujan to Hiya was her beautiful voice. He found his mother in Hiya's songs, because his Maa was a prolific singer and "full of life" – which is what was mesmerising about Hiya. In Kolkata, Elina's condition did not immediately improve even after the surgery; and as Hiya was lonely without her 'Monima' (Elina), she came to Kolkata to be with her and then as if a magic happened: Elina started to respond to the treatment.

Hiya starts her search of life in the city of Kolkata. She subsequently has a near-fatal head-injury and soon after slips into comatose state. Knowing that paralysis is unavoidable, Amolendu performs a complicated surgery and saves her life. After seeing Hiya lying on a bed and unable to walk, Ujan is depressed and heartbroken. This leads to newfound inspiration, and he proposes. Shortly before the wedding, Hiya walks again, to Ujan's relief. On their wedding day, Manjari, daughter of Ujan's mother's friend reaches Ujan's house. Manjari had sought him out due to her mother's worsening condition. Ujan is forced to go and operate her, leaving Hiya at home, in the middle of their Fulshojjya. Manjari's mother dies and Ujan takes the responsibility of taking care of Manjari. It is revealed that she is secretly in love with Ujan, and wishes to marry him. She starts scheming and creating problems in Ujan & Hiya's relationship; though this has no effect; and she soon becomes frustrated and lonely. As a foil to Manjari, there was Dr. Romit Sen, Ujan's colleague at Tulip, who was always there as single man support system to Hiya and Ujan. He loved Hiya but never expressed it till he was about to leave the world because of Leukemia. Romit left his only daughter to his best friend Hiya and Ujan and they too accepted her as their child; but then, Romit's uncle appeared on the scene and took away Romit's daughter, Imli, with him to Kurseong. Hiya shared a very special bonding with Imli because Imli saw her own mother Sabina in Hiya; but when Imli went away, Hiya felt a deep void within her and she wished to become a mother, in the real biological sense. Imli had arisened parental feelings in Ujan too and he also felt Hiya's agony; both of them started to plan about a family of their own. Their honeymoon was long overdue; so, they went to Pelling just after Christmas. They had a wonderful time, both mountain-lovers, as Hiya was from the hills and Ujan was a trekker by hobby, they enjoyed the breathtaking scenery and relived their good old days, far from the madding crowd's ignoble strife. By that time in Kolkata, scheming Manjari had a co-hort in Vicky, Ujan's cousin brother and the two started to make plans to keep Ujan and Hiya in perpetual trouble. As if these two were not enough, in came established industrialist Ashok Kapoor with his sinister plan of either to take over "Tulip" or to start a whole new Nursing Home with all sorts of modern medical facilities, to be a tough competitor of "Tulip" which was by then synonymous with Health-Care in Kolkata. What Kapoor did not realize and was incomprehensible to business-minded folk like him, was that the secret of success of "Tulip" was not just its facilities but its cheerful and homely atmosphere, created by its dedicated staff and a bunch of ever energized junior doctors who were there to face any kind of emergency situation at any time of a day or night. As individuals, they used to enjoy their shares of good things of life but while on duty, they were untiring: Drs. Avro-Ayan-Saurav-Ranjan-Gogol-Madhushree-Kaushani-Nayana-Shahana: everyone of them were impatient to learn something new from their seniors; ever ready to assist each other and when Hiya came, they were the ones who befriended her and later became her loyal "knights-in-armour". If "Tulip" was the lifeline of wellness then these Doctors were the lifeline of "Tulip". Elina, because of her absolute faith on her staff and Doctors did not bend to Kapoor's subtle offer of buying her dream "Tulip"; then Kapoor showed his true colours and involved Vicky-Manjari to convince Ujan to come to his Nursing Home: "Zeus" because he knew that Ujan was the main stay of "Tulip". Ujan saw through Kapoor and did not accept his offer. Again Manjari was forced to play a pivotal role to drag Ujan to "Zeus" and this time Ujan did not doubt his childhood friend's intentions:and agreed to her request to join Zeus as a confirmation of wanting to help her because previously, he reproached Mon antagonistically when she expressed her bleak desire of love from him. Ultimately, the secret game of Kapoor came out in the open during the course of a path-breaking surgery, successfully done by Dr. Ujan Chatterjee, in "Zeus", and everyone's conscience came into play: Manjari discovered Kapoor's intention to keep Ujan at any cost; Ujan observed Kapoor's wrong ways of running a Nursing Home and Vicky-Manjari both realised Kapoor was using them to win this game to further his own ill intentions and grab all the limelight. Dr. Madhusree, who joined "Zeus" from "Tulip" to earn some more money for her Mother's treatment, and was the single witness to Kapoor's dangerous game plan, had a "face-off" with the planner himself. Her razor sharp comments and Ujan's refusal to accept any money after the surgery, awakened that hidden conscience in Kapoor who was a contemporary antagonist and was the real catalyst of all the murky & controversy embroiled situations. Though created by him nothing was ever proved against him rather these incidents became eye-openers for many, but nothing made any difference in that belief and love which was there between Ujan and Hiya. One fine day, it was known that Hiya was pregnant; Hiya, a "child- woman" who never knew her parents and was nurtured and loved by her foster mother, was happy beyond anyone's imagination; Ujan's love and affection showered on her at this happy hour and Elina's gift of the responsibility of "Tulip", inspired Hiya to bring out of her mind's closet, that calm and matured woman who could gracefully handle both the responsibilities. But suddenly all those happy moments came to a grinding halt as Hiya had a miscarriage. It was traumatic not only for Hiya but for Ujan, also. And this trauma brought a sea-change in Manjari, too. She took the initiative to bring Hiya back to her normal self; she accepted Vicky in her life. In the meantime Hiya was diagnosed as having Myotonic Dystrophy-a genetic disorder, by her Gynaecologist Dr. Deepa who opined that it could be fatal for Hiya to conceive. Hiya's dreams dashed; but still she stood up because she wanted their child. While Ujan did not want to take any risk on Hiya because of the disorder, Hiya was desperate in love to gift back Ujan his lost childhood in the form of their baby. So she went away from Ujan to undergo treatment and make herself physically fit to conceive, obviously without leaving any trace to find her which again made Ujan dejected & life-less, as he was, before meeting Hiya. While Hiya was away, her lookalike, a 10/11-year-old girl, was admitted in "Tulip" and attracted Ujan's affection; she was a patient of amnesia and during the course of her treatment, it was known that she had lost her parents in a road accident and her only family now was her aunt. Ujan named her Diya; took her to her aunt's home but when he learned that her aunt's family was going to send her to an orphanage, he decided to adopt her as his daughter. Ujan with Manjari's help announced his second marriage to Manjari, a ploy to bring Hiya back. Hiya came back from her self-imposed exile, accepted Diya as their daughter and after the birth of Hiya and Ujan's baby boy, they had their feel of a complete happy family: it was 'love is in the air' at the end of the series.

== Cast ==
Character	Portrayed by
Dr. Ujan Chatterjee	Rishi Kaushik
Hiya Chatterjee	Aparajita Ghosh Das
Dr. Amolendu Chatterjee	Dr. B. D. Mukherjee
Dr. Shamoresh Ganguly	Arindam Sil
Mrs. Elina O'Brien	Saswati Guha Thakurta
Annie O'Brien	June Malia
Bashabdatta the dietician	Kamalika Banerjee
Matron Eva Das	Mithu Chakraborty
Dr. Romit Sen	Tota Roy Chowdhury
Manjari	Priya Paul / Sneha Chatterjee Bhowmik
Manjari's mother (aka Shantamashi)	Urmimala Basu
Dr. Deepa	Chandrayee Ghosh
Dr. Moinak Roy	Saswata Chatterjee
Dr. Barna Roy	Debolina Dutta
Dr. Swati Raha	Ushasie Chakraborty
Puja	Ekavali Khanna
Dr.Nota	Baishaki Marjit
Vicky	Anindya Banerjee

== Crew ==
The directors are Anindo Banerjee and Joydeep Mukherjee. Executive producers are Indrani Mukherjee and Nishpal Singh, and producers are Aniruddho Roychoudhury and Jit Banerjee. The executive producer from STAR Jalsha is Aratrika Bhoumik. The title music was by Jeet Ganguly, with singer Monali Thakur. Camera operators were Premendu Bikash Chaki, Bapi Seth, and Suman Kumar Das.

Story, screenplay and dialogue
Anuja Chatterjee
Aditi Majumdar
Joy Mukherjee
Kaushik Bhattacharya
Joydeep Mukherjee
Sayantani Majumdar Nambiar
Joy Dasgupta

== Production ==
=== Use of music and poems ===
Ekhane Akash Neel makes good use of sequence-synchronized poems and songs. The writings of filmmaker Satyajit Ray's grandfather, Upendrokishor Roy Choudhury, and his father, Sukumar Ray, were frequently sources. "Katukutuburo", "Ghyanghyanshur", "Gomratherium" and "Kumropotash" are a few examples. A noteworthy scene of this kind is when Imli describes everyone in Ujan's house as "Ha-Ja-Ba-Ra-La" (the Bengali equivalent of Alice in Wonderland).

Music was an integral part of the show as well. Tagore's songs were used in an innovative way that captured their appeal and flavour. One folk song which was often used in the series to portray a character's inner thoughts was "Amar Bhitaro Bahire Antaro Antarey Achho Tumi...". A few modern Bengali songs were also used. The song ami tomar sathe ekla hote chai became a hit, music directed by MUSIC Maestro of Bengal JEET GANNGULI....

== Reception ==
In week 22 of 2020, the series has risen to second place with 1.379 million impressions for the most watched television series in Bengal.
