= Soudaminir Sansar =

Indian Bengali soap opera

- Also known as: Soudaminir Songshar
- Genre: Drama Family Comedy
- Written by: Saswati Ghosh
- Directed by: Shibangshu Bhattacharjee --- (present); Rajendra Prasad Das (past)
- Starring: Susmili Acharjee; Adhiraj Ganguly
- Opening theme: Soudaminir Sansar
- Ending theme: Soudaminir Sansar
- Country of origin: India
- Original language: Bengali
- No. of seasons: 1
- No. of episodes: 387

Production
- Producer: Joydeb Mondal
- Production location: Kolkata
- Camera setup: Multi-camera
- Running time: 22–24 minutes
- Production company: Jyoti Productions

Original release
- Network: Zee Bangla
- Release: 17 June 2019 – 12 February 2021

Related
- Bhanumotir Khel; Alo Chhaya

Soudaminir Sansar is an Indian Bengali-language television drama which premiered on 17 June 2019. It was broadcast on Bengali General Entertainment Channel Zee Bangla and is also available on the digital platform ZEE5, and SEEFlix, even before its TV telecast. The series starred Susmili Acharjee and Adhiraj Ganguly. The story line was set in the 1950s, often referred to as the Golden era of Bengal.

== Plot ==
Soudamini and Shankar get married during childhood. They have fun-filled spooky escapades and treasure hunts within the joint family of the Mukherjee household. In her past life, Soudamini brings peace into this chaotic household of her in-laws but dies prematurely. However, she returns to the same home as a young artist named Mini Mukherjee in her next birth. She rescues the family's treasures, brings peace again in the family, tells everyone that Soudamini was killed by Annakali in her previous birth. She marries off Shankar with Manasha and returns to Kolkata.

== Synopsis ==
In the year of 1952, this series shows the story of Soudamini, an orphan girl, who lived with her grandfather in Khoerkota village. Harisadhan Mukherjee's family was in the possession of a gold coin or Mohor passed on through generations. But their family members are at loggerheads with each other over this gold coin as Bhoot Dadu, Karalisadhon Mukherjee, the ghost of the late grandfather of Harisadhon, was determined to not give any mohor or gold coins to anyone till their feud and jealousy towards each other in the family ends and peace returns to the house. He has Soudamini marry Shankar, Harisadhan's second grandson, in this Mukherjee's "kondol" family as he believes she's the only one who can bring peace in this house. Sodu tries to find an amicable solution to their family feud as she bonds with her cousin-in-laws Dhana, Lakshmi and Gansha. Her and Shankar's daily cute arguments continue as they get to know each other better. After her mother-in-law does not accept her and Annakali, her aunt-in-law, repeatedly insults her, Soudamini finally brings peace into her in-laws' chaotic household along with a sweet bonding with Shankar and everyone else in the family.

The story goes on as the daily comedic events of Puja and fun competitions and the feel of old Bengali village times brings a bright color to their story. Sodu's good friend Phuli marries her elder brother-in-law Dhana. Sodu, Dhana, Gansha, and Lakshmi open a Jatradol secretly, as Dhana's dream was to be a great Jatra Samrat, and also because their family fell into a money crisis. They keep Shankar out of their plan, as Sodu wants Shankar to focus on his studies only, which he doesn't that much. Their play unexpectedly becomes popular and it helps them to earn more for the family as everything fell into a peaceful and happy track again. Although it became quite hard for Sodu to disguise as both Soudamini and Jatralakshmi since everyone thought they were both a different person. Things couldn't get worse as Shankar grew a crush on the said Jatralakshmi, as he loved her acting not knowing she was his own wife. After some time, the truth comes out as the family gets angry at them and Harisadhan tells Sodu to leave the house as he felt betrayed that they kept lying to them even though they did it for their family's good. Grief-stricken Sodu leaves the house with teary eyes as both Shankar and the rest of the family were in pain and didn't want her to go. Shankar was determined to bring Sodu back and their bonding grew stronger as he slowly starts to fall in love with her not realizing it and did everything to help her as the gang Dhana, Phuli, Gansha, and Lakshmi were with them. With also Shankar celebrating Sodu's birthday to make her feel happy. Finally with the help of Shankar and the gang, Harisadhan realizes his mistake and welcomes Sodu back home with a warm hug. She finds her mother Moa Maa, who is alive and discovers that she was adopted by her grandfather when her mother lost her at a village fair. Peace finally comes back in the family as they all happily celebrated Lakshmi Puja. Tragically Annakali Soudamini's aunt-in-law (Mejo Maa) kills her by drowning as she tried to know the location of the said gold coins from Sodu, but she never reveals it to her. Annakali made everyone believe that Soudamini died by accident and that she tried to save her.

=== 15 years later ===
Soudamini comes back in her next birth. Shankar became a good and the only Doctor in the village for his late wife Soudamini's wish. Even though he became completely different and stoic then before and only believed his Mejo Maa, Annakali as he thought no one else in his family cared enough for Sodu as Annakali was the only one who heard Sodu's cries that day and tried to save her. In her next birth Soudamini was born as an actress named Mini. She came to Shankar's village Berachampa with her Mom and Dad, for her new movie's shooting and enters Mukherjee house as Sodu. Everyone thought she is having mental problems as she slowly starts to regain her past lives memories so Shankar starts treating her due to her family's request. Mansha, Shankar's second wife, who is also Annakali's niece starts to hate and grow jealous of her. Shankar slowly starts to suspect that Mini is his lost Sodu as she came back in a reincarnation which both Bhootdadu and the family believed but Mini remains silent in pain even though she knew the truth, because it could cause a problem for her to know the actual truth behind Sodu's death. The two of them form a sweet friendship, but Mini's heart was soon broken as Shankar tries to explain her that all she remembers now was the past. She may be a reincarnation for Sodu, but she is also Mini who is a star and has a career for herself. Grief-stricken Shankar asks Mini to leave and that she shouldn't remain stuck in her past lives’ memories and love anymore, it's not possible for them to be together since Shankar has a second wife now but the age difference between them still doesn't help as they both remember their sweet memories together. Chini, Mini's cousin sister, and Gansha fall in love and marry.

Due to Maa Bagala Mukhi's hand in making Mini's mind believe that she is Sodu, Mini starts living with Soudamini's memories only. After being able to remember the passcode or chora that Bhoot Dadu had given to Sodu years back, she finally finds the location of those Gold Coins (Mohor) in their village's old temple. With the help of Bhoot Dadu and Chini, she reveals the truth about Sodu's death and exposes her death as a murder. Everyone went into a huge shock as Shankar couldn't believe that the person, he trusted the most after Sodu's death was the reason why Sodu is not with them anymore. Annakali escapes and disguises herself as a Saint (Sadhu Baba) and also as a dacoit as she tried to snatch the gold coins away but failed in doing so. Mini uses those gold coins for the betterment of the village and the family. Everyone became happy once again and starts preparation for Shankar and Mini's wedding as they wanted them to be together again but at the end Mini prepares Mansha as the bride and announces that she now knows that she is Mini not Soudamini and that she has her own career and identity to focus on. Also, it would unfair for them to not give Mansha a chance since she also realized her mistakes and became good. Mansha and Shankar remarry. The village also slowly starts developing with the gold coin's money. A few months later Mini's family visits the Mukherjee house when her film on Soudamini's life is shown and released. The show ends with a happy ending as they all watch the movie together and relive their old memories. Both Shankar and Mini smile at each other with a last glance, as happy tears flow out of Mini's eyes, seeing her past life Soudamini's story now woven into a beautiful film.

== Cast ==
=== Main ===
- Susmili Acharjee as
  - Soudamini Mukherjee aka Sodu, (Deceased), Shankar's wife
  - Mini Mukherjee (in Soudamini's next birth), daughter of Tapati and Lokesh Mukherjee, Chini's cousin
- Adhiraj Ganguly as Dr. Shankar Mukherjee, Harisadhan's grandson, Moynamoti and Goursadhan's son, Soudamini and Monosha's husband,a doctor.
- Soumi Banerjee as Monosha Mukherjee: Shankar's second wife.

=== Recurring ===
- Samir Biswas as Late Karali Mukherjee, Sodu's "Bhoot Dadu": Harisadhan's grandfather.
- Biswajit Chakraborty as Harisadhan Mukherjee: Shankar's paternal grandfather, Umasadhan, Kalisadhan and Goursadhan's father
- Prity Biswas as Annakali Mukherjee (Main Antagonist) : Lakshmi's and Ganesh's mother, Kalisadhan's wife, Sodu's killer.
- Sourav Das as Dhananjay Mukherjee aka Dhana: Umasadhan and Haimaboti's son, Shankar and Lakshmi's elder cousin Brother, Phuli's husband, Chorki's father
- Beas Dhar / Poonam Basak as Phuli Mukherjee: Soudamini's good friend and Dhana's wife and Chorki's mother
- Bhavana Banerjee as Lakshmirani Mukherjee aka Lakshmi: Shankar elder cousin sister
- Dedipya Ganguly as Ganesh Mukherjee aka Gansha: Shankar's younger cousin brother and Chini's husband.
  - Debrishi Chatterjee as Young Ganesh Mukherjee
- Oindrila Saha as Chini Mukherjee: Mini's cousin sister and Ganesh's wife
- Debapratim Dasgupta as Goursadhan Mukherjee: Moynamoti's husband, Shankar's father.
- Samata Das as Moynamoti Mukherjee: Goursadhan's wife, Shankar's mother
- Sumit Samaddar as Umasadhan Mukherjee: Haimaboti's husband, Dhona's father
- Boni Mukherjee as Haimaboti Mukherjee: Umasadhan's wife, Dhana's mother
- Arindol Bagchi as Kalisadhan Mukherjee: Annakali's husband, Lakshmi and Ganesh's father.
- Tanisha Ganguly as Chorki Mukherjee: Dhana and Phuli's daughter
- Manasi Sengupta as Tapati Mukherjee: Mini's mother
- Neil Chatterjee as Lokesh Mukherjee: Mini's father
- Mousumi Kar Chatterjee as Moa Maa: Soudamini's biological mother

== Production ==
=== Filming ===
Based on the backdrop of rural Bengal, the series filming at a studio in Pailan.

== Awards ==
Year	Award	Category	Nominee	Presenter	Result	Note
2018	Zee Bangla Sonar Sansar Awards	Best Producer	Rajendra Prasad Das		Won	Collectively
2018	Zee Bangla Sonar Sansar Awards	Best Production	Joydeb Mondol	Jyoti Production	Won	Collectively
Year	Award	Category	Character	Nominee	Result	Note
2019	Zee Bangla Sonar Sansar Awards	Best Daughter	Soudamini Mukherjee	Susmili Acharjee	Won	Collectively
2019	Zee Bangla Sonar Sansar Awards	Best Young Actor	Shankar Mukherjee	Adhiraj Ganguly	Won	Collectively
2019	Zee Bangla Sonar Sansar Awards	Favourite child artist	Ganesh Chandra Mukherjee	Debrishi Chatterjee	Won	Collectively
2019	Zee Bangla Sonar Sansar Awards	Best brother-in-law	Ganesh Chandra Mukherjee	Debrishi Chatterjee	Won	Collectively
2019	Zee Bangla Sonar Sansar Awards	Best brother-in-law	Dhananjoy Mukherjee	Sourav Das	Won	Collectively
2019	Zee Bangla Sonar Sansar Awards	Best sister-in-law	Lakshmi Rani Mukherjee	Bhavana Bannerjee	Won	Collectively
