= Sean Banerjee =

Indian actor and model

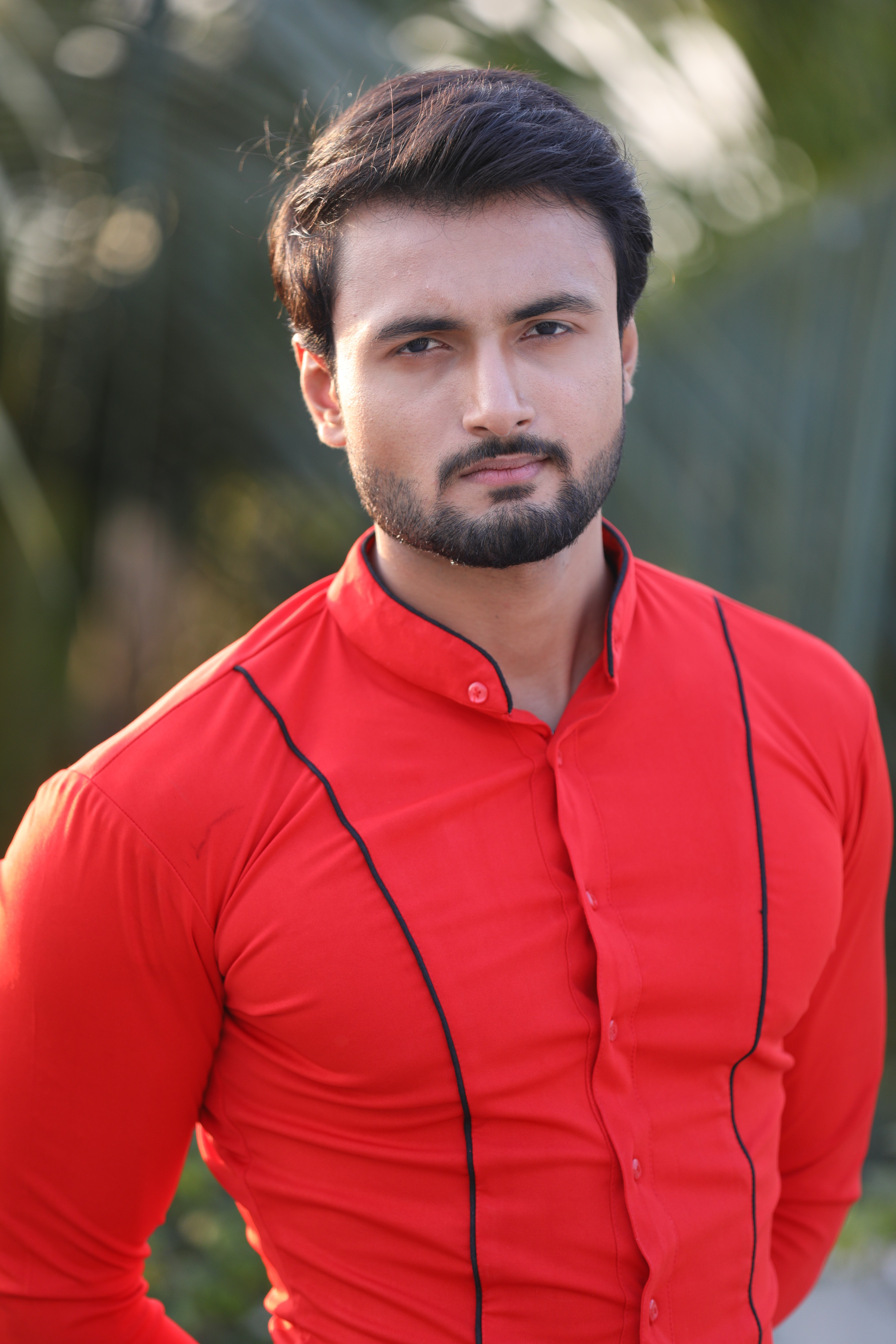
- Banerjee in 2020
- Born: April 26, 1995 (age 31); Kolkata, West Bengal, India
- Occupations: Actor; Model
- Years active: 2018–present
- Known for: Ami Sirajer Begum; Ekhane Aakash Neel; Mon Phagun
- Relatives: Supriya Devi (grandmother) Soma Chatterjee (mother)

Sean Banerjee is an Indian actor and model. He is known for portraying the character of Nawab Siraj Ud-Daulah in the historical drama Ami Sirajer Begum and is also known for playing Dr. Ujaan Chatterjee in the romantic medical series Ekhane Aakash Neel, Rishi Sen in childhood love story Mon Phagun, and Aranyak in Roshnai. He has also worked on some other webseries.

== Early life ==
Sean Banerjee was born in Kolkata, West Bengal. His mother is Soma Chatterjee, a film scholar, and his father is Mrigen Banerjee. He is the grandson of Supriya Devi, an actress. He has an elder brother named Neil Goswami. He studied at Sherwood College, Nainital, and graduated from Delhi College of Art.

== Career ==
Banerjee began his career in modeling. He made his television debut in 2018 with Ami Sirajer Begum on Star Jalsha and acted as the male protagonist, Nawab Siraj ud-Daulah, in the series.

== Filmography ==
=== Films ===
Year	Title	Role	Language	Notes	Ref.
2025	Raktabeej 2	Young Animesh Chatterjee	Bengali		
2025	Jodi Emon Hoto	Ranojay	Bengali		
—N/a	Antardrishti	Sujoy	Bengali		
—N/a	Kothay Shahjahan		Bengali		

=== Television ===
Year	Title	Role	Notes	Channel	Language
2018–2019	Ami Sirajer Begum	Nawab Siraj-ud-Daulah	Lead Role	Star Jalsha	Bengali
2019–2020	Ekhane Aakash Neel	Dr. Ujaan Chatterjee	Lead Role	Star Jalsha	Bengali
2021–2022	Mon Phagun	Rishiraj Sen Sharma	Lead Role	Star Jalsha	Bengali
2024–2025	Roshnai	Aranyak Chatterjee aka Badshah	Lead Role	Star Jalsha	Bengali

=== Web series ===
- Honeymoon (2023 web series) (as Ishan)
- Pilkunj (2023 web series) (as Sidharth)

== Awards ==
West Bengal Tele Academy Awards

Year	Category	Nominated work	Notes	Ref.
2019	Best Actor	Ami Sirajer Begum		
2022	Best Onscreen Couple	Mon Phagun		
2025	Best Brother	Roshnai		

Calcutta Times Awards and Award

Year	Category	Ref.
2025	Filmfare for Emerging face in fashion	
2019	Most Desirable Man	
