= Samata Das =

Indian actress

- Born: Kolkata, India
- Occupation: Actress
- Known for: Nagordola, Sreemoyee, Saraswatir Prem

Samata Das is an Indian actress. She rose to fame for her role as Lati in Buddhadev Dasgupta's National Award winning film Mondo Meyer Upakhyan (2002).

== Personal life ==
Das married Bengali television assistant director Shankar Chanda, right after appearing for her Higher Secondary examination. She later studied at the Jogesh Chandra Chaudhuri College of the University of Calcutta.

== Filmography ==
=== Feature films ===
Year	Title	Role	Note	Ref
2002	Mondo Meyer Upakhyan			
2002	Desh	Suprabha Chowdhury		
2005	Nagordola			
2005	Ek Mutho Chhobi			
2005	Manik	Latika		
2006	Hero			
2007	Dus Din Pore	Basanti		
2008	Lal Ronger Duniya			

=== TV series ===
Year	Title	Role
2000–2005	Ek Akasher Niche	Tuski
	Shonar Horin	
	Chokher Tara Tui	Mitul
	Sadhak Bamakhyapa	Maa Tara
2008	Sukh - Thikana Baikunthapur	
2012	Nader Nimai	
2017	Karunamoyee Rani Rashmoni	Jogmaya
2019	Sreemoyee	Sreemoyee's sister
2019–2021	Soudaminir Songsar	Moynamati
2020–2021	Saraswatir Prem	Anu
2021	Dutta And Bouma	
2022–2023	Gouri Elo	Sujata
2022	Boddhisattowar Bodhbuddhi	Kalpana
2022	Dhulokona	Aditi
2023	Ramprasad	
2024–2025	Debiboron	Bharati
2025–2026	Chirosokha	Doll
2025	Bullet Sorojini	Ronodeb's late mother
