= Laalkuthi =

Indian Bengali language suspense thriller drama

- Genre: Drama; Thriller; Suspense; Horror
- Created by: Surinder Films
- Written by: Sromona Ghosh
- Screenplay by: Anandarupa Das; Pele Bhattacharya
- Directed by: Subhendu Chakraborty
- Creative directors: Monimala Pal, Nairwita Dutta
- Starring: See below
- Theme music composer: Samidh Mukherjee
- Country of origin: India
- Original language: Bengali
- No. of episodes: 149

Production
- Executive producers: Sromona Ghosh; Aniruddha Ghosh; Sreya Guha
- Producers: Surinder Singh; Nispal Singh
- Production location: Dassani 1 Studio
- Camera setup: Multi camera
- Running time: 22 minutes
- Production company: Surinder Films

Original release
- Network: Zee Bangla
- Release: 2 May – 25 November 2022

Laalkuthi is a 2022 Indian thriller-drama television series. The lead actors are Rooqma Ray as Anamika Roy Chowdhury and Rahul Banerjee as Vikram Dastidar.

== Plot ==
Vikram and his family live in a house in Laalkuthi. They perceive something wrong in the house. The story revolves around how Anamika, after marrying Vikram, reveals the secret of Laalkuthi as she also felt something amiss in the house.

== Cast ==
=== Main ===
- Rukma Roy as Anamika Roy Chowdhury / Ujjayini Dutta aka Jini
  - Indrani Bhattacharya as Young Ujjayini Dutta aka Jini
- Rahul Banerjee as Vikram Dastidar: Bibhuti and Supriya's son; Sourjyo's younger brother; Ujjayini's husband
  - Debmalya Gupta as Young Vikram Dastidar

=== Recurring ===
- Anamika Saha as Karunamoyee Dastidar: Vikram's grandmother; Anamika's grandmother-in-law; Bibhuti's mother; the senior resident of Lalkuthi House
- Hritojeet Chatterjee as Souryo Dastidar: Bibhuti and Supriya's elder son; Vikram's elder brother
- Sneha Chatterjee as Baishali Dastidar (née Dutta) aka Shelly: Debrup and Alakananda's elder daughter; Jini's elder sister; Souryo's wife
  - Beas Dhar as young Baishali Dutta
- Debdut Ghosh as Bibhutibhusan Dastidar: Vikram and Sourya's father; Supriya's husband
- Tanuka Chatterjee as Supriya Dastidar: Vikram and Sourya's mother; Bibhuti's wife
- Shraboni Bonik as Sulekha: Dastidar's employee.
- Pinky Mallick as Bishakha Deb: Supriya's sister-in-law; Phalguni's wife; Bishwajit and Bithi's mother; Mohua's mother-in-law
- Judhajit Banerjee as Phalguni Deb: Vikram and Sourya's maternal uncle; Supriya's elder brother; Bishakha's husband; Bishwajit and Bithi's father
- Sritama Bhattacharjee as Bithi Deb: Vikram's maternal cousin sister; Bishwa's elder sister; Bishakha and Phalguni's daughter; Tirtha's wife
- Sutirtha Saha as Tirtha: Bithi's husband
- Suvajit Kar as Biswa Deb: Phalguni and Bishakha's son; Vikram and Sourya's maternal cousin-brother; Supriya's nephew; Mohua's husband
- Prriyam Chakraborty as Mohua Deb (née Dutta): Bishwa's wife; Phalguni and Bishakha's daughter-in-law
- Deerghoi Paul as Richa: an office employee
- Payel Dutta as Rupali Das: Baishali's caretaker
- Sohon Bandopadhyay as Abhiroop Roy Chowdhury (real Dutta): Anamika's uncle
- Anindita Saha Kapileswari as Rajeshwari Roy Chowdhury (real Dutta): Anamika's aunt
- Bharat Kaul as Debrup Dutta: Son of G.C.Dutta; Alakananda's husband; Baishali and Ujjayini's father; owner of Lalkuthi and G.C.Dutta & Sons
- Bhola Tamang as Manager of Dutta Jewellers
- Abanti Dutta as Dr. Sen
- Anamika Chakraborty as Jhilly / Fake Jini - Ujjayini's friend

== Reception ==
TRP ratings for 2022
Week	BARC viewership		Ref.
Week	TRP	Rank	Ref.
Week 18	5.8	9	
Week 19	4.6	8	
Week 20	4.1	11	
Week 21	5.2	13	
Week 22	5.3	10	
Week 23	5.4	10	
Week 24	4.8	10	
Week 25	5.5	11	
Week 26	5.3	12	
Week 27	5.3	9	
Week 28	5.2	12	
Week 29	4.9	12	
Week 30	4.9	12	
Week 31	5.0	9	
Week 32	5.0	14	
Week 33	4.8	13	
Week 34	4.7	13	
Week 35	4.5	13	
Week 36	4.4	15	
Week 37	4.9	14	
Week 38	4.6	13	
Week 39	4.3	14	
Week 40	3.6	15	
Week 41	4.5	17	
Week 42	4.2	16	
Week 43	3.8	15	
Week 44	4.0	17	
Week 45	3.7	14	
Week 46	3.7	14	
Week 47	3.4	15	
