= Beder Meye Jyotsna (TV series) =

Bengali language Television series

- Promotional Poster
- Genre: Drama; Fantasy
- Created by: Surinder Films
- Written by: Anandarupa Das; Shouvik Mitra
- Directed by: Suman Roy
- Starring: Ravi Shaw; Sneha Das
- Composer: Debjit Roy
- Country of origin: India
- Original language: Bengali
- No. of episodes: 629

Production
- Producers: Surinder Singh; Nispal Singh
- Production location: Kolkata
- Cinematography: Paritosh Singh
- Camera setup: Multi-camera
- Running time: 22 minutes
- Production company: Surinder Films

Original release
- Network: Sun Bangla
- Release: 3 February 2019 – 17 January 2021

Beder Meye Jyotsna is a Bengali television soap opera that premiered on 3 February 2019 to 17 January 2021. It is produced by Surinder Films and stars Ravi Shaw and Sneha Das.

== Cast ==
=== Main ===
- Sneha Das / Mousumi Debnath / Anindita Raychaudhury as Jyotsna (dead)
- Ravi Shaw / Biplab Banerjee as Rajkumar Kanchan husband of Jyosna (dead)
- Shreema Bhattacherjee as Rohini Jyotsna and Kanchan's Daughter
- Arkajyoti Paul Chaudhury as Agni aka Joddha Rohini's husband

=== Recurring ===
- Monalisa Paul as Kamini (dead)
- Arindya Banerjee as Somesshor Jyotsna and Kanchan's friend and Tara's husband
- Prriyam Chakraborty as Tara Somesshor's wife, Jyotsna's friend
- Chaitali Chakraborty as Rakkhosi Thandi (dead)
- Payel Piya Das as Mohini
- Sayanta Modak as Bikram
- Chandrayee Ghosh as Kalnagini Bikram's Mother and Agni's Step Mother (dead)
- Juiee Sarkar as Rani Rukmini (dead)
- Priyam as King (dead)
- Rupam Singha as Bodhaditto (dead)
- Jasmine Roy as Poddini (dead)
- Sayan Banerjee as Ranojoy (dead)
- Swarnava Rith Sanyal as Young Rajkumar Kanchan
- Sudipta Banerjee as Vishkanya Bishakha (dead)
- Idhika Paul as Lakkhi (dead)
- Anamika Chakraborty as Queen of bird (Bangomi)
- Sreelekha Mitra as Yogini (dead)
- Rittika Sen as Queen of fairy (Sadapori)
