= Ekhane Aakash Neel (2019 TV series) =

Indian Bengali Romantic TV Series

- Title Poster
- Genre: Medical; Romantic; Drama
- Created by: Surinder Films
- Written by: Shweta Bharadwaj, Paramita Munsi Bhattacharjee
- Directed by: Simanto Banarjee
- Starring: Anamika Chakraborty; Sean Banerjee
- Opening theme: Ekhane Aakash Neel by Monali Thakur
- Country of origin: India
- Original language: Bengali
- No. of seasons: 2
- No. of episodes: 289

Production
- Producers: Surinder Singh; Nispal Singh
- Production location: Kolkata
- Cinematography: Paritosh Singh
- Running time: 22 minutes (approx.)
- Production company: Surinder Films

Original release
- Network: Star Jalsha
- Release: 23 September 2019 – 3 October 2020

Related
- Ekhane Aakash Neel (2008 TV series); Sanjivani (2019 TV series)

Ekhane Akash Neel is a Bengali romantic medical drama series that aired on Star Jalsha and streamed on the digital platform Hotstar from 23 September 2019. It was a reboot of the popular show Ekhane Aakash Neel (2008 TV series). It was also the remake of the StarPlus show Sanjivani (2019 TV series). Produced by Surinder Films, it starred Anamika Chakraborty as Dr. Hiya Mitra and Sean Banerjee as Dr. Ujaan Chatterjee. It ended on 3 October 2020 and was replaced by Ogo Nirupoma.

== Plot ==
The story follows the characters Dr. Ujaan Chatterjee, one of the best five heart surgeons in the world, and Hiya Mitra, an aspiring doctor. Ujaan is ill-tempered and solely focused on work and does not believe in love, while Hiya is outgoing and compassionate and believes in love. Initially, Hiya comes to Kolkata to attend the city's top medical college, Tulip. The college was a part of Tulip Hospital, owned by Ujaan's father, Dr. Samaresh Chatterjee. However, unable to pay the high fees, Hiya returns to her home village. Still passionate about helping people, Hiya begins working at a health camp in the village.

At the health camp, Hiya encounters Dr. Samaresh Chatterjee, who was suffering from longstanding knee pain. Hiya volunteers to cure Samaresh pain with ayurvedic treatment. Intrigued by Hiya's enthusiasm, Dr. Chatterjee invites her to his home in Kolkata for his treatment. There, Hiya is delighted to meet Dr. Ujaan Chatterjee and immediately idolizes him as her "guru," or greatest teacher. Ujaan, on the contrary, is disgusted to encounter such a talkative, interfering girl.

Time passes and Hiya and Ujaan grow close. Hiya is supposed to leave Kolkata after successfully curing Dr. Samaresh after a period of 10 days. However, she accidentally gets into the expired medicine racquet of Ujaan's step-brother Bihaan and she is accused with attempt to murder the patients. She is publicly humiliated and arrested. However, it does not sit right in Ujaan's heart and he proves her innocent.

After some time, Ujaan and Hiya become close, and Ujaan begins to feel destined to be with Hiya. However, Ujaan refuses to acknowledge this, as when he was a child, his father abandoned his mother, Basobi Chatterjee, and remarried Meenakshi. Growing up, Ujaan had to live separated from his mother, with the assumed identity of his father's adopted child. This greatly pained Ujaan, but he never exposed his feelings. Hiya becomes aware of this and tries to bring his mother back to him. Just as Ujaan is ready to express his true feelings for Hiya, she leaves him saying that she had never loved him. However, the truth is that she had incurable heart disease and believed Ujaan would not be able to bear this news.

Ujaan is heartbroken. At this time, Dr. Jhinuk Sen enters Tulip Hospital. She had escaped from her psychologically abusive fiancé along with his daughter Ollie, from his first wife.

Ujaan develops a bond with Oli after learning about her father's abusive nature, so he enters into a fake marriage arrangement with Jhinuk Sen for six months to protect her.

Hiya again encounters Ujaan at Tulip in spite of trying hard not to meet him. They get married and Ujaan successfully operates on Hiya, curing her of heart disease. Jhinuk Sen is acting like a psychopath because of Bihaan's wrong medicine but later she intentionally tries to separate Hiya from Ujaan's life and get permanent entry into his life. Even she tries to kill Hiya. A few days later, they reveal their marriage to everyone. Meanwhile, Ujaan's younger stepbrother Bihaan kills Dr. Jhinuk Sen whom he had mistaken for Hiya and drugged. Bihaan is arrested along with Meenakshi who had made several attempts in the past to harm Hiya. Nilima, who had earlier intended to marry Ujaan and had tried to destroy Hiya and Ujaan's relationship, becomes friendly. A few years later, Hiya becomes a doctor at Tulip Hospital. The season concludes as Hiya and Ujaan welcome their new daughter, Hiyaan.

== Cast ==
=== Main ===
- Anamika Chakraborty as Dr. Hiya Chatterjee (née Mitra) – a practising doctor at Tulip Hospital, Ujaan's wife, Hiyaan's mother, Bikash Mitra's daughter, Bulbuli's elder half-sister
- Sean Banerjee as Dr. Ujaan Chatterjee (aka Raja) – a heart surgeon, Hiya's husband. Hiyaan's father, Dr. Samaresh and Basobi's son, Bihaan, Pablo, and Jinia's half-brother

=== Recurring ===
- Ananda Ghosh as Abhrajeet Sen (aka Dodo) - a rich businessman, Hiya's childhood best friend and ex-fiancé
- Sudipa Basu as Gayatri Chatterjee – Samaresh's mother, Ujaan's grandmother
- Phalguni Chatterjee as Hiya's paternal uncle, an ayurvedic practitioner
- Biplab Banerjee (younger) as Bikash Mitra – Hiya's father
- Kaushik Chakraborty as Dr. Samaresh Chatterjee – Ujaan's father, 51% owner of Tulip Medical Hospital, and Hiya's father-in-law.
- Sujata Dawn as Meenakshi Chatterjee – Samaresh's second wife, Ujaan's stepmother/adoptive mother.
- Sudip Sarkar as Dr. Bihaan Chatterjee – Samaresh and Meenakshi's elder son, Ujaan's younger half-brother
- Satyam Bhattacharya as Rehaan Chatterjee aka Pablo – Samaresh and Meenakshi's youngest son, Ujaan's youngest half-brother.
- Nandini Dutta / Rupsha Mondal as Jinia Chatterjee – Samaresh and Meenakshi's daughter, Ujaan's younger half-sister.
- Chandni Saha as Dr. Nilima Debroy – Dr. Ujaan Chatterjee's family friend and a doctor in Tulip, Bihaan's love interest and wife.
- Anindya Chakrabarti as Deepak Debroy - a businessman and 49% owner of Tulip Hospital, Nilima's father
- Kanyakumari Mukherjee as Dr. Parama Goswami
- Aditi Chatterjee as Basobi Chatterjee – Samaresh's first wife, Ujaan's biological mother, Hiya's mother-in-law
- Nisha Poddar as Bulbuli Mitra – Hiya's younger cousin sister
- Bidisha Chakraborty as Hiya's paternal aunt, Bulbuli's mother, Bikash's sister
- Ritobrota Dey as Jia
- Sanchita Bhattacharya as Meera the matron (chief nurse) of Tulip Medical Hospital
- Suman Banerjee as Dr. Sarkar
- Jayasree Mukherjee as Kanchana Debroy- Nilima's mother
- Ayendri Lavnia Roy as Dr. Sunayana
- Kuyasha Biswas as Ayesha (aka Ash) - a medical student, Hiya's enemy and bully
- Promita Chakraborty as Late Dr. Jhinuk Sen - Oli's adoptive mother, Raktim's ex-fiancée, Ujaan's fake wife, acts like psychopath but true villain in Hiya and Ujaan's life
- Fahim Mirza as Raktim Bose / Mainak - Jhinuk's ex-fiancé, Oli's father, Jinia's fake friend, a psychopath
- Anindita Saha as Raktim's mother, Oli's paternal grandmother

=== Guest appearance ===
- Arijit Chowdhury as Bhaidada- a ruthless don; Ujaan's patient
- Subikash Paul as Bhaidada's righthand; kidnapper of Hiya
