= Naqaab =

Naqaab may refer to:

- Niqāb, cloth that covers the face in a hijab
- Naqab (1955 film), an Indian Hindi-language fantasy film featuring Shammi Kapoor
- Naqaab (2007 film), an Indian Hindi-language suspense thriller film featuring Akshaye Khanna and Bobby Deol
- Naqaab (2018 film), an Indian Bengali-language supernatural action horror comedy film featuring Shakib Khan

== See also ==
- Naqab or Negev, a desert and semidesert region of southern Israel
- Naqab, Iran (disambiguation)
