= Pilkunj =

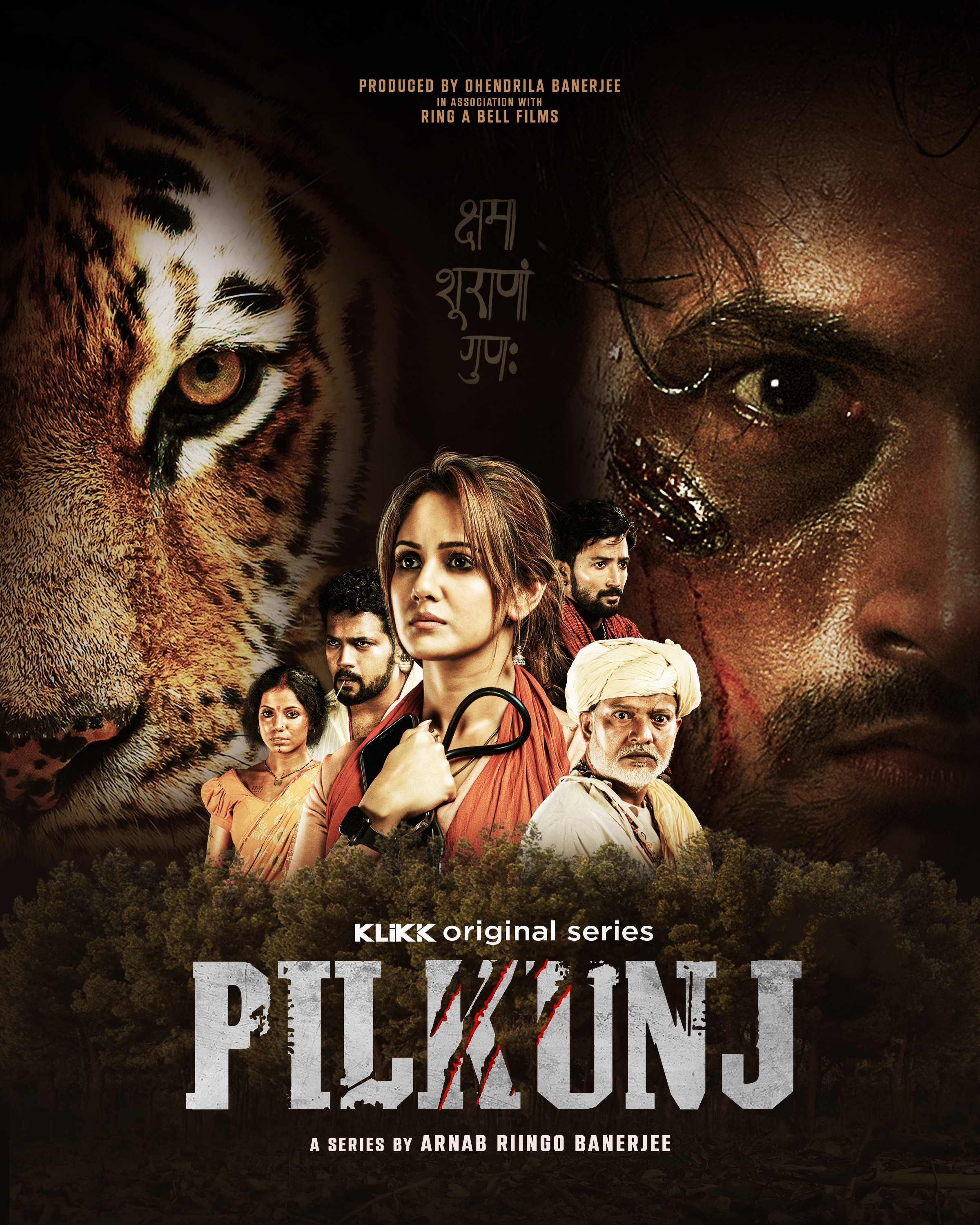
- Genre: crime and thriller
- Written by: Arnab Riingo Banerjee
- Story by: Arnab Riingo Banerjee
- Directed by: Arnab Riingo Banerjee
- Starring: Trina Saha, Brishti Roy, Sean Banerjee, Joey Debroy, Devtanu and Shankar Debnath
- Country of origin: India
- Original language: Bengali
- No. of seasons: 1
- No. of episodes: 6

Production
- Producers: Ohendrila Banerjee and Ring a Bell Films
- Cinematography: Arnab Riingo Banerjee

Original release
- Release: 31 August 2023

Pilkunj is a 2023 Indian Bengali language crime and thriller web series written and directed by Arnab Riingo Banerjee. Ohendrila Banerjee is the producer.

The series starring Trina Saha, Brishti Roy, Sean Banerjee, Joey Debroy, Devtanu and Shankar Debnath are in the main cast. Pilkunj is based on real event held in India in 2017.

== Cast ==
- Trina Saha as Dr. Bidita Bag
- Brishti Roy as Jharna
- Sean Banerjee as Siddharth Sekhar
- Joey Debroy as Shailesh
- Devtanu as Satinder
- Shankar Debnath as Rameshwar Gayen
- Soham Guha Pattader as Gulla

== Synopsis ==
Pilkunj is a 2017 Indian television series based on true event. A scandal sprang up in a little community near a tiger reserve. Several people were killed as a result of tiger attacks. This occurrence is part of a larger scheme. Siddharth, a journalist from Calcutta, goes to this area in disguise to investigate the reality of this scheme, but is mistakenly apprehended. During his adventure, he encounters a female doctor who joins him. Finally, they divulged the village's secret.

== Episodes ==
No.	Title	Directed by	Original release date
1	"The Marriage"	Arnab Riingo Banerjee	31 August 2023
Siddharth travels to Pilkunj for a wedding photography assignment and gets into a fight with Sailesh.
2	"The Witness"	Arnab Riingo Banerjee	31 August 2023
Siddharth witnesses one of the most horrible human sacrifices, leaving him scared and aware that death hovers about him.
3	"Shock"	Arnab Riingo Banerjee	31 August 2023
Death is imminent, and you are alone in the Core area. Siddharth has one of the darkest meetings of his life, while Ram Babu's family reveals truths that upset Bidita.
4	"Lost"	Arnab Riingo Banerjee	31 August 2023
Siddharth's ordeal begins as man and predator engage in a game of hide and seek as his life hangs in the balance.
5	"Escape"	Arnab Riingo Banerjee	31 August 2023
Luck assists Siddharth in evading the canine, but he is pulled back into the water, where all of the risks began. Siddharth's prospects of survival are dwindling as Bidita assumes command.
6	"Redemption"	Arnab Riingo Banerjee	31 August 2023
The race to survive the jungle and its predators is on, but is it truly feasible to survive when both man and jungle are on your side?
