= Premer Phande =

Indian Bengali television serial

- Genre: Drama; Romance; Comedy
- Created by: Ravi Ojha Productions
- Story by: Mitali Bhattacharya; Dialogues; Sharmila Chowdhury
- Directed by: Gopal Chakraborty
- Starring: Mishmee Das; Rajib Basu; Tanima Sen; Kanchana Moitra
- Composer: Kalyan Sen Barat
- Country of origin: India
- Original language: Bengali
- No. of seasons: 1
- No. of episodes: 140

Production
- Producers: Ravi Ojha; Mitali Bhattacharya
- Production location: Kolkata
- Running time: 22 minutes
- Production company: Ravi Ojha Productions

Original release
- Network: Zee Bangla
- Release: April 18 – September 4, 2016

Premer Phande (Bengali: প্রেমের ফাঁদে); was a popular romantic comedy Bengali television Soap opera that premiered on April 18, 2016, and airs on Zee Bangla, produced by Ravi Ojha Productions and starred Mishmee Das as main female protagonist and Rajib Basu as main male protagonist.

== Plot summary ==
The story revolves around the lives of Mohor and Rishi. Rishi belongs to a joint family and works for a matrimonial company. Rishi's family is very supportive. He is a young lad and being the elder among two brothers, he is loved and pampered by everyone in the family. On the other hand, Mohor is a mature orphan girl. Mohor comes to Kolkata for her job. One fine day, much to his disgust, Mohor joins the matrimonial company as Rishi's boss. Mohor, who is new in the city, ends up becoming a tenant at Rishi's house. Rishi's family likes Mohor very much and his grandmother wants that Rishi should fall in love with Mohor. From here, starts the sweet fun chemistry of Rishi and Mohor, who being the boss troubles Rishi at work and Rishi, being the landlord irritates Mohor at home. This creates a hilarious ruckus due to the unconventional role reversal of Mohor and Rishi. Will this unique chemistry give rise to a sweet love story?

== Casts ==
- Mishmee Das as Mohor Roy / Priyanka Majumdar
- Rajib Basu as Rishi Ganguly
- Tanima Sen as Rishi's Grandmother
- Anirban Guha as Rishi's Father
- Chaitali Dutta Burman as Srimoyee Ganguly
- Kanchana Moitra as Shiuli Ganguly
- Abhijit Deb Roy as Rishi's Uncle
- Aniket Chakraborty as Jeet Ganguly
- Partha Sarathi Deb as Mishra Ji
- Sujoy Saha as Bijit
- Misty Das as Mili Ganguly
- Piyali Mukherjee as Tithi Ganguly
- Arnab Banerjee as Jayanta Ganguly
- Koushik Chakraborty as Barin Majumdar
