= Shibaji Panja =

Shibaji Panja is a businessman from Kolkata, known to be close to Mamata Banerjee. Shibaji did his education in Kolkata and started RP Infosystems which was manufacturing the very popular PC brand CHIRAG. Under his guidance, CHIRAG became one of the top indigenously manufactured computer brands in India. He was arrested in February 2015 on charges of having forged papers for taking a Rs. 18 crore loan from Industrial Finance Corporation of India. The arrest occurred while Panja was accompanying Mamata as part of the team returning from a visit to Bangladesh, causing widespread media coverage and opposition accusations of harbouring criminals in her court. Banerjee has said that what businessmen in her entourage may have been doing is not related to her. The Economic Offences Wing of the Delhi Police investigated and claimed that the purchase order, invoices, ferry receipts and acknowledgement notes were all forged, and the firm address was found to be non-existent. The matter is still sub-judice and Panja was granted bail for the case in question by the competent Court.

== Profile ==
Panja had been appointed to several high-powered West Bengal committees related to film and culture and is an official advisor for industrial promotion.

Panja was one of the founders of the RP Group, a set of businesses marketing a computer branded "Chirag" and also in film production. The RP Group also is in control of the popular TV News Channel Kolkata TV.

With the revoking of excise benefits, the Indian Computer brands such as HCL, Wipro, Zenith, PCS and CHIRAG were all competing directly with the MNC's without any price advantage which was not the case earlier. This proved to be the bane for all these brands and all of them are today non-existent in the market.

Since then, Panja resigned from the board of the RP Group in early 2013 by officially striking off his name from the Registrar of Companies. He is now a successful producer of content for Bengali Entertainment channels such as STAR Jalsa and ETv Bangla.
