= Aay Tobe Sohochori =

Indian Bengali Television Drama Series

- Genre: Drama
- Screenplay by: Malova Majumdar; Arpita Pal
- Story by: Sahana Dutta
- Directed by: Sumon Das; Shovon Monojit
- Creative directors: Ritorupa Bhattacharya; Sahana Dutta
- Starring: Koneenica Banerjee; Arunima Haldar Indrajit Chakroborty Indranil Chatterjee
- Country of origin: India
- Original language: Bengali
- No. of seasons: 1
- No. of episodes: 341

Production
- Executive producers: Debolina Saha, Reshmi Roy, Lagna Ghosh (Star Jalsha)
- Producers: Rohit Samanta; Sahana Dutta
- Production location: Kolkata
- Cinematography: Manoj Kumar, Alok
- Editors: Shyamoli Chando, Rana
- Camera setup: Multi-camera
- Running time: 23 minutes
- Production company: Missing Screw Manoranjan Pvt. Ltd.

Original release
- Network: Star Jalsha
- Release: 13 September 2021 – 9 September 2022

Aay Tobe Sohochori is a 2021 Indian Bengali language television series that premiered on 13 September 2021 on Star Jalsha. It is also available on the digital platform Disney+ Hotstar. The show is produced by Sahana Dutta of Missing Crew Productions and stars Koneenica Banerjee and Arunima Haldar.

== Plot ==
Aay Tobe Sohochori follows the story of Sohochori, a middle-aged woman, who returns to college with a long-held dream of studying and becoming a gold-medalist by overcoming all barriers of family and society. There she meets Borfi, who's nearly half her age, and the two form an unlikely friendship that becomes central to Sohochori's journey towards the life she had once wanted for herself.

== Cast ==
=== Main ===
- Koneenica Banerjee as Sohochori "Soi" Gupta – Sudhanshu's daughter; Samaresh's wife (separated); Tipu's mother; Borfi's classmate, friend and mother in-law (2021 – 2022)
- Arunima Halder as Ranjini "Borfi" Sarkar Sengupta – Hirak and Sohini's daughter; Debina's half-sister; Rumki and Jhumki's cousin; Tipu's wife; Sohochori's classmate, friend and daughter in-law (2021 – 2022)
- Indrajit Chakraborty as Samaresh "Somu" Sengupta – Mrinalini's eldest son; Tuban, Pola, Koli and Bubai's brother; Sohochori's husband (separated); Tipu's father; Debina's former love interest (2021 – 2022)
- Indranil Chatterjee as Roudro "Tipu" Sengupta – Sohochori and Samaresh's son; Ruby's cousin; Borfi's husband (2021 – 2022)
- Kuyasha Biswas as Debina "Binti" Sarkar Sengupta – Hirak and Raka's daughter; Borfi's half-sister; Samaresh's former obsessive lover; Bubai's wife; Sohochori's former rival (2021 – 2022)
- Arindya Banerjee as Aranya "Bubai" Sengupta – Mrinalini's youngest son; Samaresh, Tuban, Pola and Koli's brother; Debina's husband (2021 – 2022)

=== Recurring ===
- Manoj Pal as Sudhanshu Gupta – Sohochori's father; Tipu's grandfather (2021 – 2022)
- Chhanda Chatterjee as Mrinalini Sengupta – Samaresh, Tuban, Pola, Koli and Bubai's mother; Tipu and Ruby's grandmother (2021 – 2022)
- Animesh Bhaduri as Pulokesh "Tuban" Sengupta – Mrinalini's second son; Samaresh, Pola, Koli and Bubai's brother; Bonya's husband; Ruby's father.(2021 – 2022)
- Ankita Majhi as Mohona "Bonya" Sengupta – Borfi's school principal; Tuban's wife; Ruby's mother (2021 – 2022)
- Archika Gupta as Ruby Sengupta – Bonya and Tuban's daughter; Tipu's cousin (2021 – 2022)
- Nabanita Dutta as Apala Sengupta aka Pola – Mrinalini's eldest daughter; Samaresh, Tubai, Koli and Bubai's sister (2021 – 2022)
- Aemila Sadhukhan as Kothakoli Sengupta aka Koli – Mrinalini's youngest daughter; Samaresh, Tubai, Pola and Bubai's sister (2021)
- Dev Chatterjee as Mainak Basak – Kishore's friend; Renu's husband; Rumki and Jhumki's father; Borfi's uncle (2021-2022)
- Arijita Mukhopadhyay as Renuka Basak – Mainak's wife; Rumki and Jhumki's mother; Borfi's aunt (2021 – 2022)
- Soumi Ghosh as Rumki Basak aka Rinki – Mainak and Renu's elder daughter; Jhumki's sister; Borfi's cousin (2021)
- Alokananda Guha as Jhumki Basak – Mainak and Renu's younger daughter; Rumki's sister; Borfi's cousin (2021)
- Sujoy Prasad Chatterjee as Hirak Sarkar – Raka's husband; Sohini's boyfriend; Debina and Borfi's father (2022)
- Ankita Roy as Kajol – Sengupta's maid (2021–present)
- Nabanita Mazumder as Chopola – Borfi's house maid (2021)
- Mayukh Mukherjee as senior ragging boy of College (2021)
- Arghya Mukherjee as Kishore – Principal of Sohochori's college; Mainak's friend (2021 – 2022)
- Suman Das as Professor Pakrashi (2021)
- Samir Biswas as priest (2021)
- Basanti Chatterjee as Harimati (2022)
- Tanushree Saha as Sandhya (2022)
- Manoj Ojha as Abhishek Dutta Chowdhury aka ADC – Sohochori and Tuban's boss; Pola's love interest (2022)
- Sarbani Chatterjee
- Niladri Lahiri
- Olivia Malakar
- Moushumi Chakrabarty
- Manishankar Banerjee
- Akashdeep Bhowmik
- Pradip Dhar
- Sharmila Das

== Reception ==
=== TRP Ratings ===
Week	Year	BARC Viewership		Ref.
Week	Year	TRP	Rank	Ref.
Week 3	2022	8.6	6	
Week 4	2022	8.6	4	
Week 5	2022	9.1	6	
Week 6	2022	9.1	4	
Week 7	2022	8.8	5	
Week 8	2022	8.2	5	
Week 9	2022	8.3	5	
Week 10	2022	8.5	5	
Week 11	2022	8.3	6	
Week 12	2022	8.1	7	
Week 13	2022	6.8	9	
Week 14	2022	6.7	9	
Week 15	2022	6.0	7	
Week 16	2022	6.1	8	
Week 17	2022	6.1	8	
Week 18	2022	5.7	10	
Week 19	2022	6.6	6	
Week 20	2022	5.9	9	
Week 21	2022	5.8	8	
