= Teko (film) =

2019 Indian Bengali film

- Theatrical release poster
- Directed by: Abhimanyu Mukherjee
- Starring: Ritwick Chakraborty; Srabanti Chatterjee
- Edited by: Rabiranjan Maitra
- Production company: Surinder Films
- Release date: 22 November 2019
- Running time: 110 Minutes
- Country: India
- Language: Bengali

Teko is a 2019 Indian Bengali-language comedy-drama film directed by Abhimanyu Mukherjee and produced by Surinder Films. The film stars Ritwick Chakraborty and Srabanti Chatterjee in lead roles. The film was scheduled for release on 22 November 2019. The story is about Alokesh who is obsessed with his hair, but in a twist of fate, he goes bald after applying an oil that’s touted to boost hair growth. Life deals him a double blow when his hair-obsessed fiancée, Mina, calls off their wedding after he reveals his bald scalp to her. He then sets out to seek revenge.

== Cast ==
- Ritwick Chakraborty as Alokesh
- Srabanti Chatterjee as Mina
- Kanchan Mallick
- Sudeshna Roy
- Abhijeet Guha
- Manasi Sinha
- Buddhadeb Bhattacharya
- Aritro Dutta Banik
- Shreema Bhattacherjee as Rupa

== Soundtrack ==
Track listing
No.	Title	Singer(s)	Length
1.	"Toke Chai"	Timir Biswas	3:18
2.	"Keshto"	Debdeep Mukhopadhyay	3:20

== Release ==
The trailer of the movie released on 19 October 2019.
