= Zee Bangla =

Indian television channel

- Country: India
- Broadcast area: India; Bangladesh; Maldives
- Headquarters: Kolkata, West Bengal, India

Programming
- Language: Bengali

Ownership
- Owner: Zee Entertainment Enterprises
- Sister channels: Zee Channels

History
- Launched: 15 September 1999
- Founder: Subhash Chandra
- Former names: Alpha TV Bangla (1999–2005)

Links
- Website: Zee Bangla on ZEE5

Zee Bangla is an Indian Bengali-language general entertainment pay television channel owned by Zee Entertainment Enterprises.

== History ==
The channel was launched on 15 September 1999 as Alpha TV Bangla, along with Alpha TV Marathi, Alpha TV Telugu and Alpha TV Punjabi. It was the first Bengali-language satellite television channel in India. In February 2020, it was one of the largest Bengali-language television channels in India by viewership.

On 30 September 2021, Bangladesh imposed a blackout on foreign television channels, including Zee Bangla, that broadcast commercials. Two weeks later, Zee Bangla resumed broadcasting in Bangladesh, albeit without the commercials.

== Current programming ==
=== Drama series ===
Premiere date	Title	Ref.
11 November 2024	Parineeta	
4 June 2025	Kusum	
8 September 2025	Jowar Bhanta	
15 December 2025	Tare Dhori Dhori Mone Kori	
19 March 2026	Saat Pake Bandha	
13 April 2026	Kamala Nibas	
1 June 2026	Annapurnar Lokkhira	
29 June 2026	Dulari	
24 August 2026	Sundarbaner Baghini	
24 August 2026	Satipith Kalighat	

=== Reality shows ===
Premiere date	Title	Ref.
29 June 2026	Didi No. 1 Season 10	
29 June 2026	Sashuri Boumar Rannaghor	
5 July 2026	Dadagiri Unlimited	

== Former programming ==
=== Drama series ===
- Aamar Durga
- Agnipariksha
- Alo Chhaya
- Alor Kole
- Amader Ei Poth Jodi Na Sesh Hoy
- Amloki
- Amader Dadamoni
- Andarmahal
- Anondi
- Aparajita Apu
- Bagh Bondi Khela
- Bhanumotir Khel
- Bhootu
- Bibi Chowdhurani
- Bikele Bhorer Phool
- Bodhisattwor Bodhbuddhi
- Bokul Kotha
- Boyei Gelo
- Chirodini Tumi Je Amar
- Chokher Bali
- Duggamoni O Baghmama
- Dwiragaman
- Ei Chheleta Bhelbheleta
- Ek Akasher Niche
- Ekdin Pratidin
- Esho Maa Lokkhi
- Gouri Elo
- Goyenda Ginni
- Hriday Haran B.A. Pass
- Icche Putul
- Jagaddhatri
- Jamai Raja
- Jamuna Dhaki
- Jarowar Jhumko
- Jibon Saathi
- Jogomaya
- Joy Baba Loknath
- Joyee
- Kache Aye Shoi
- Kadambini
- Kanakanjali
- Karunamoyee Rani Rashmoni
- Kar Kachhe Koi Moner Kotha
- Khelna Bari
- Ki Kore Bolbo Tomay
- Kojagori
- Kone Dekhaa Alo
- Konya
- Kon Gopone Mon Bheseche
- Kori Khela
- Krishnakoli
- Laalkuthi
- Lokkhi Kakima Superstar
- Mili
- Mithai
- Mithijhora
- Mukut
- Netaji
- Nokshi Kantha
- Pandab Goenda
- Phoolmoni
- Phirki
- Phulki
- Pilu
- Premer Phande
- Raadha
- Raage Anuraage
- Rajjotok
- Rajlakshmi Kurukshetram
- Ranga Bou
- Rangiye Diye Jao
- Ranu Pelo Lottery
- Rimli
- Saat Bhai Champa
- Saat Paake Bandha
- Sarbojaya
- Seemarekha
- Soudaminir Sansar
- Stree
- Subarnalata
- Tobu Mone Rekho
- Tomar Khola Hawa
- Trinayani
- Tumi Robe Nirobe
- Uma
- Uron Tubri

=== Animated series ===
- Bantul The Great
- Bhootu Animation
- Tenida

=== Reality shows ===
- Dadagiri Unlimited
- Dance Bangla Dance
- Mirakkel
- Randhane Bandhan
- Sa Re Ga Ma Pa Bangla

== Sister channel ==
=== Zee BanglaSonar ===
Zee BanglaSonar is an Indian Bengali-Language Movie channel owned by Zee Entertainment Enterprises. It was launched on 23 September 2012. It was formerly known as Zee Bangla Cinema until 10 August 2025. It is a sister channel of Bengali-language network Zee Bangla.
