= Bokul Kotha =

2017 Indian Bengali language TV series

- Genre: Drama; Romance; Thriller
- Screenplay by: Vivek Ranjan Chatterjee
- Story by: Ashita Bhattacharya; Dialogues; Ayan Chakroborty
- Directed by: Soumen Halder; Sumalya Bhattacharya
- Creative directors: Satyaki and Birsha Dasgupta
- Presented by: Acropoliis Entertainment
- Starring: Ushasi Ray; Honey Bafna
- Voices of: Ujjaini Mukherjee; Suvam Moitra
- Theme music composer: Suvam Moitra
- Composer: Indra (Baban)
- Country of origin: India
- Original language: Bengali
- No. of episodes: 674

Production
- Producers: Soumen Halder; Sumalya Bhattacharya
- Camera setup: Multi-camera
- Running time: 22 minutes
- Production company: Acropoliis Entertainment Pvt. Ltd.

Original release
- Network: Zee Bangla
- Release: 4 December 2017 – 1 February 2020

Related
- Sindura Bindu

Bokul Kotha is an Indian Bengali television soap opera that aired on Zee Bangla from 4 December 2017 to 1 February 2020. The show was produced by Acropolis Entertainment Pvt. Ltd. and starred Ushasi Ray and Honey Bafna in lead roles and Uponita Bnaerjee, Sumanta Mukherjee, Shreyasree Samanta, Suvajit Kar, Arindam Banerjee and Biplab Banerjee in supporting roles.

The show is a remake of the Odia series Sindura Bindu that aired on Zee Sarthak and it was well received by the audience. In June 2018, the show had a TRP of 11.2. The show marked the return of Ushasi Ray in a lead role on Bengali television since her portrayal of 'Ahona' in the Star Jalsha drama series Milon Tithi, also produced by Acropoliis Entertainment. The story follows Bokul, a tomboyish girl, who takes on all the responsibilities of the head of the family. After much drama and confusion, she marries Rishi, who had already rejected 40 women for marriage.

== Premise ==
The storyline revolves around a girl named Bokul, living in Barasat, West Bengal. She is tomboyish in nature but a brave, honest and free-spirited soul. Under unforeseen circumstances, she marries Rishi. Initially, Rishi does not accept Bokul as his wife due to her appearance and mannerisms, but after getting to know her closely, they develop a strong bond with each other, which evolves into a unique relationship, with their friendship being the base. Bokul carves a special place for herself in the hearts of Rishi's family members with her loving and caring nature. Rishi also stands by Bokul in her fight against her late father's culprits and supports her in resuming her studies to become an IPS officer.

== Cast ==
=== Main ===
- Ushasi Ray as Bokul Sanyal Roy – IPS Officer; Lajbonti and Animesh's younger daughter; Anjali and Shekhar's younger daughter-in-law; Barsha's sister; Rohan and Roshni's sister-in-law; Rishi's wife. (2017–2020)
- Honey Bafna as Rishi Roy – A rich and successful businessman; Anjali and Shekhar's younger son; Rohan and Roshni's brother; Bokul's husband. (2017–2020)

=== Recurring ===
- Upanita Banerjee as Barsha Sanyal Basu – Lajbonti and Animesh's elder daughter; Bokul's sister; Kunal's wife. (2017–2020)
- Suvajit Kar as Kunal Basu – A spoiled opportunist; Rohan, Rishi and Roshni's cousin; Barsha's husband. (2017–2020)
- Sohini Sanyal / Sanjukta Roy Chowdhury as Lajbonti Sanyal – Animesh's widow; Barsha and Bokul's mother. (2017–2019) Later in 2018 Sohini Sanyal came back.
- Rajib Banerjee as Animesh Sanyal - Barsha and Bokul's late father. (2017)
- Anuradha Roy as Gaayatri Sanyal – Animesh's mother; Barsha and Bokul's grandmother. (2017–2019)
- Mayukh Chatterjee as Goblu – Bokul's friend. (2017–2018)
- Sumanta Mukherjee as Late Shekhar Roy – A businessman; Samar's brother; Pritha's brother-in-law; Anjali's husband; Rohan, Roshni and Rishi's father; Mishti and Dabbu's grandfather. (2017–2019)
- Saswati Guha Thakurta as Anjali Roy – A school teacher; Samar's sister-in-law; Pritha's sister; Shekhar's wife; Rohan, Roshni and Rishi's mother; Mishti and Dabbu's grandmother. (2017–2020)
- Pritha Chatterjee as Pritha – Anjali's sister. (2018–2019)
- Arindam Banerjee as Samar Roy – A corrupt businessman; Shekhar's brother; Ragini's husband; Isha's father; Who is involved Animesh's murder conspiracy. (2017–2020)
- Mallika Majumdar as Ragini Roy – Samar's wife; Shekhar's sister-in-law; Isha's mother. (2017–2020)
- Subhrajit Dutta as Rohan Roy – Anjali and Shekhar's elder son; Roshni and Rishi's brother; Aditi's husband; Mishti's father. (2017–2020)
- Arpita Mukherjee as Aditi Roy – Anjali and Shekhar's elder daughter-in-law; Roshni and Rishi's sister-in-law; Rohan's wife; Mishti's mother. (2017–2020)
- Smriti Singh / Angelina Ghosh / Saheli Ghosh Roy as Mishti Roy – Rohan and Aditi's daughter. (2017-2020)
- Shreyasee Samanta as Roshni Roy Banerjee – Anjali and Shekhar's daughter; Rohan and Rishi's sister; Sourav's wife; Dabbu's mother. (2017–2019)
- Sutirtha Saha / Rajkumar Dutta as Sourav Banerjee – Anjali and Shekhar's son-in-law; Rohan and Rishi's brother-in-law; Roshni's husband; Puja's brother, Dabbu's father. (2017–2018)
- Deerghoi Paul as Puja Banerjee – Saurabh's sister. (2018)
- Aishik Mukherjee as Dabbu Banerjee – Roshni and Saurabh's son. (2017–2019)
- Amrita Debnath as Isha Roy Chatterjee – Samar and Ragini's daughter; Bokul's sister-in-law and friend; Deep's wife. (2017–2020)
- Arnab Chowdhury as Deep Chatterjee – Rishi's friend and co-worker; Samar and Ragini's son-in-law; Bokul's brother-in-law Isha's husband. (2017–2020)
- Uma Bardhan as Shikha – Kunal's aunt; Rocky's mother. (2018–2019)
- Raj Bhattacharya as Rocky – Shikha's son; Kunal's cousin. (2018)
- Biplab Banerjee as Rajatava Rakshit – A corrupt minister; Animesh's murderer; Tina and Arunabha's father. (2019)
- Namita Chakraborty as Bani Rakshit – Rajatabha's wife; Tina and Arunabha's mother. (2019)
- Priyanka Halder as Tina Rakshit – An arrogant brat; Rajatabha and Bani's daughter; Arunabha's sister. (2019)
- Neil Chatterjee as Arunabha Rakshit – An arrogant brat; Rajatabha and Bani's son; Tina's brother; Esha's fiancé; Bokul's rival. (2018-2019)
- Gopa Nandi as Tumpa – Lajbonti's neighbour; Bokul's well-wisher. (2017-2019)
- Biresh Chakraborty as Inspector Agnijit Roy. (2018-2020)
- Himangshu Dey as Builder Tapan Biswas (2019)
- Tapan Ganguly as Sandip Hazra - Former DIG of Police, Rajatava's former friend (2019-2020)
- Sujoy Sinha as Arghya Pal - Commissioner of police (2019-2020)
- Ananya Sengupta as Ranita Singha – DIG of police; Bokul's boss. (2020)
- Gora Dhar as Corrupt Advocate Binod Pradhan. (2019-2020)
- Biswabasu Biswas as Max Bhai (2019)
- Debraj Mukherjee as Mukhtar Shikder aka Musa Bhai. (2019-2020)

=== Cameo appearances ===
- Ankita Bhattacharya
- Sourav Ganguly
- Snighdhajit Bhowmik
- Gaurav Sarkar
- Gaurab Roy Chowdhury

== Adaptations ==
| Language | Title | Original release | Network(s) | Last aired | Notes |
|---|---|---|---|---|---|
| Odia | Sindura Bindu ସିନ୍ଦୁର ବିନ୍ଦୁ | 7 March 2015 | Zee Sarthak | 15 February 2020 | Original |
| Bengali | Bokul Kotha বকুল কথা | 4 December 2017 | Zee Bangla | 1 February 2020 | Remake |
| Tamil | Sathya சத்யா | 4 March 2019 | Zee Tamil | 24 October 2021 | Remake |
| Telugu | Suryakantham సూర్యకాంతం | 22 July 2019 | Zee Telugu | 9 November 2024 | Remake |
| Malayalam | Sathya Enna Penkutty സത്യാ എന്ന പെൺകുട്ടി | 18 November 2019 | Zee Keralam | 17 April 2021 | Remake |
| Kannada | Sathya ಸತ್ಯ | 7 December 2020 | Zee Kannada | 10 August 2024 | Remake |
| Hindi | Meet: Badlegi Duniya Ki Reet मीत: बदलेगी दुनिया की रीत | 23 August 2021 | Zee TV | 14 November 2023 | Remake |
| Marathi | Shiva शिवा | 12 February 2024 | Zee Marathi | 8 August 2025 | Remake |
