= Shagun Pandey =

Indian television actor and model

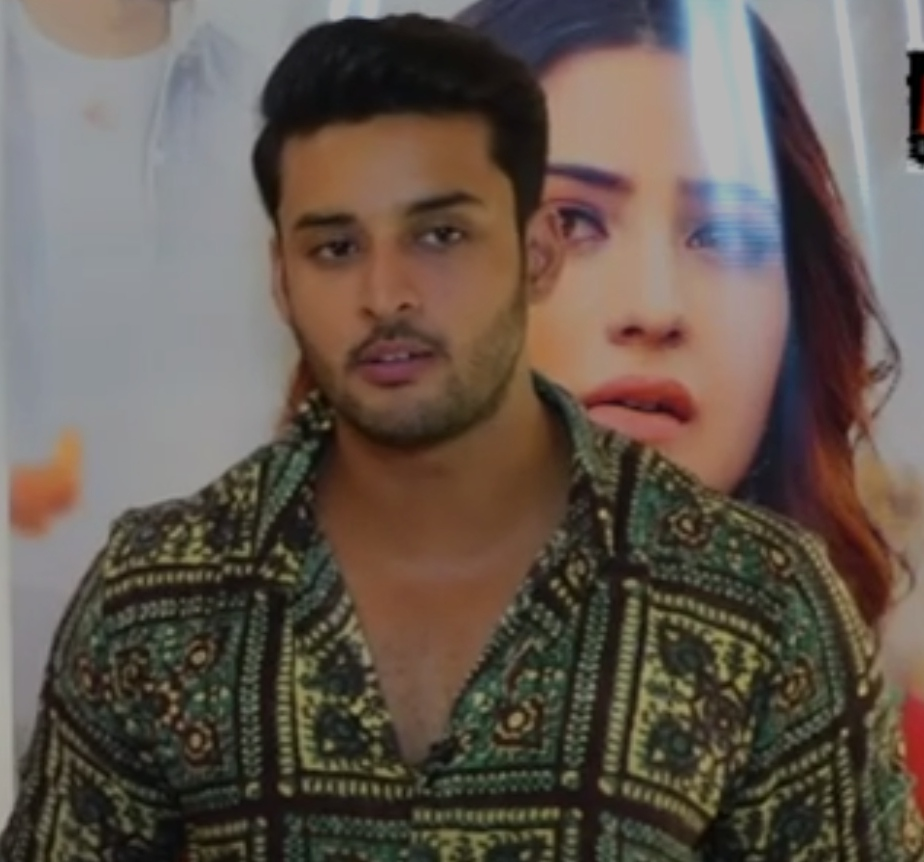
- Pandey in 2021
- Born: 31 March 1997 (age 29); Chandigarh, India
- Occupation: Television actor
- Years active: 2015–present
- Known for: Mera Balam Thanedaar, Tujhse Hai Raabta, Meet: Badlegi Duniya Ki Reet, Saru

Shagun Pandey is an Indian television actor. He made his acting debut with Santoshi Maa as Guddu Tripathi. He portrayed Atharv Bapat in Tujhse Hai Raabta, Uday Sahni in Kyun Utthe Dil Chhod Aaye, Meet Ahlawat and Manmeet Sangwan in Meet: Badlegi Duniya Ki Reet.

== Filmography ==
=== Television ===
Year	Title	Role	Notes	Ref.
2016	Santoshi Maa	Gulshan "Guddu" Parihar		
2016	Pyaar Tune Kya Kiya	Rajant "Raju" Pathak	Season 7; Episode 11	
2016	Pyaar Tune Kya Kiya	Mirzya Khan	Season 9; Episode 4	
2016–2017	Badho Bahu	Vardaan Singh		
2018–2019	MTV Splitsvilla 11	Contestant	Runner-up	
2018–2020	Tujhse Hai Raabta	Atharv Bapat		
2019	Shaadi Ke Siyape	Dalveer Baweja		
2020	Shubharambh	Dr. Mihir Doshi		
2021	Kyun Utthe Dil Chhod Aaye	Uday Sahni		
2021	Pyaar Tune Kya Kiya	Pilot Sudesh Pillai	Season 11; Episode 14	
2021–2023	Meet: Badlegi Duniya Ki Reet	Meet Ahlawat		
2023	Meet: Badlegi Duniya Ki Reet	Manmeet Sangwan		
2023	Swaraj	Mahavir Singh	Episode 63	
2024	Mera Balam Thanedaar	Veerpratap "Veer" Singh		
2025–2026	Saru	Professor Ved Birla		

=== Films ===
Year	Title	Role	Notes	Ref.
2021	Blind Love	Rohan	Short film	
2021	Blind Love 2	Rohit Singhania	Short film	
2022	Blind Love 3	Rohan/Rohit	Short film	

=== Music videos ===
Year	Title	Singer	Ref.
2020	Mera Hona Ki Nahin Hona	Goldie Sohel	
2021	Memories	Ridham Kalyan	
2023	Tu Bata	Sumit Saha	

== Awards and nominations ==
Year	Award	Category	Work	Result	Ref.
2022	Indian Television Academy Awards	Best Actor	Meet: Badlegi Duniya Ki Reet	Nominated	
