= Sathya Enna Penkutty =

Indian television soap opera

- Genre: Drama
- Written by: Rajesh K Narayanan
- Screenplay by: Gireesh P C Palam
- Directed by: Faisal Adimali
- Starring: Srinish Aravind; Mersheena Neenu
- Opening theme: Anil
- Country of origin: India
- Original language: Malayalam
- No. of episodes: 426

Production
- Producer: Shaijuraj TK
- Cinematography: Vimal Krishna
- Editor: Pramod Nenmara
- Running time: 22 minutes
- Production company: Daynight creations

Original release
- Network: Zee Keralam
- Release: 18 November 2019 – 17 April 2021

Related
- Sindura Bindu

Sathya Enna Penkutty is an Indian Malayalam language television drama that aired on Zee Keralam. It stars Srinish Aravind and Mersheena Neenu in lead roles. It is an official remake of Zee Sarthak TV series Sindura Bindu aired from 2015 to 2020. The series premiered on 18 November 2019 and it aired its last episode on 17 April 2021.

== Plot ==
Sathyapriya aka Satya is a brave and tomboyish girl, who enjoys her life as it comes. She lives with her mother, grandmother and her money-minded sister, Divyapriya aka Divya. Sathya owns her late father's mechanic shed, from whom she also inherited her tomboyish nature and hangs around with her male friends. Under unforeseen circumstances, she bumps across Sudhi, a rich man who often falls victim to her antics. Sathya is in love with Sudeep Chandra, who only thinks of her as a best friend but lies about being in love with her to not hurt her feelings. Divya falls for Sudhi on seeing his money while the later sees Divya as the girl of his dreams and had fallen in love with her. Divya is also in love with Rahul who is also rich. Divya makes Rahul buy expensive gifts for her. Her friend Anu warns her of the danger of loving two persons at a time. Divya learns that Satya is in love with Sudhi. She tests whether Sudhi loves Satya and is relieved to hear that he is in love with Divya. Divya makes Satya promise her that she will disclose her love towards the person she loves only after Divya's marriage.

Satya has an accident and enters a critical stage. Satya's friend informs Divya to come and sign some papers required for immediate surgery. But Divya decides to make the surgery as late as possible so that Satya may die or be bedridden for ever. On the persuasion of her friend after some time she goes to the hospital but Sudhi manages to make the doctor do the surgery on his own risk. Divya sees Sudhi promising Satya that he will wait for her not to make Satya mentally down and not to reveal that he is already engaged to Divya. Sudhi stops seeing Satya after the surgery. As the marriage date approaches Sudhi informs his father of the melodrama he is in and he decides to break the news to Satya. Satya though heartbroken decides to help Sudhi in his wedding preparations.

A day before the marriage, Sudhi and family decides to hand over the wedding saree and ornaments as the part of the pre-wedding rituals. Satya transforms as Sulaiman (Sudhi's friend) and is shocked to know that he is marrying her own sister. When Sujitha asks for the bride's sister/ sister-like girl to hand over the saree as per the ritual but Divya tells that she does not have a sister, while Achamma tells that she has sister, but Divya interrupts that they had housed an orphan girl who is like a sister for her and has gone to Bangalore for her studies.

During the pre-wedding reception Divya seeks the help of Sulaiman to eradicate Satya from the wedding without knowing that she is Satya herself. While the reception was going on Divya's ex-boyfriend Rahul asks her to meet him at the parking area. Divya had decided to check who is more rich: Rahul or Sudhi and to marry the richest and ditch the later. Rahul had turned out to be fraudster who doesn't have single penny to live. Rahul kidnaps Divya

During the wedding day, Divya's mother obtain a letter stating that she is going with her boyfriend and she wasn't in love with Sudhi. Sujitha gets hold of the letter and reads in public which devastates Sudhi. Baiju and Sujitha declares that Pooja (Baiju's sister) will marry Sudhi. Thirumeni tells that his prediction will not be wrong and the holder of the horoscope will be Sudhi's bride. Achamma makes a shocking revelation that Divya has a younger sister and the horoscope belongs to her and she is none other than Satya. Chandradas asks Sudhi to marry Satya for his family. Both of them agree to the wedding half-heartedly. Sujitha dresses up Pooja as a bride but is shocked to see Satya being taken to the mandapam. Sudhi's mother and Sujitha leaves the wedding hall and the marriage takes place.

Meanwhile, Divya is shown to escape from Rahul only to be hit by a car. Both Satya and Sudhi behaves like ideal couple before the family members but in their bedroom they are poles apart. Though Satya loves Sudhi and expresses her love towards him, Sudhi only gives her scoldings. Problems keep arising in the form of Abhijith, Sudhi's business rival who vows to destroy Sudhi. He has been taking care of Divya and she is now in coma. Abhijith makes sure that Divya comes out of coma as soon as possible to destroy Sudhi's marital life with Satya. Satya takes the blame of a file theft case filed against Sudhi and both rekindles their relationship

Divya comes out of coma and Abhi makes Divya turn against Satya. Divya meets Sudhi and tells her that she loves him more than her life and tells that she has been kidnapped by Rahul and had been in coma. Divya in reality had no memories of her past and she believed all what Abhi and his wife Lavanya said. Sudhi and Divya starts meeting frequently and Sudhi starts developing hatred towards Satya. Satya on knowing the scenario leaves Manimangalam and transforms herself into the old tomboyish Satya and starts going to the workshop and do all the chores. Sudhi discloses his intentions to marry Divya and invite her into his life once more to his mother Radhika who also agrees to his point . To eradicate Satya from Manimangalam Sujitha, Baiju and Satheesh also agree with him leaving Chandradas heartbroken.

Sudhi arranges for a register marriage as Satya and he had not been legally married. Satya manages to save Divya from an accident and also takes her to the register office. It is revealed that Divya had realised the power of true love and has decided to make Sudhi marry Satya once more. Abhijith who had known the plan while Divya was talking to her mother through phone stabs her brutally. Staffs from the Registor office run towards the building, Sudhi and his family also run towards the place only to see a crying Satya holding heavily bleeding Divya. A dying Divya reveals that she was stabbed by Abhijith and also makes Sudhi promise that he will not leave Satya and also reveals that she had come here only to unite them. Saying this Divya dies in Sudhi and Satya's arms. Everyone is shattered on seeing Divya's death when Police arrives and Sudhi tells the Police that it was all Abhijth's doings when Satya tells the SI to come with her. Satya had killed Abhijith for murdering her sister. The show ends with Satya being taken away by the Police while a saddened Sudhi along with his family members look by.

== Cast ==
=== Main ===
- Srinish Aravind as Sudheep "Sudhi" Chandra – A business tycoon; Chandradas's younger son; Satheesh, Sujitha and Seetha's brother; Divya's ex-fiancé; Sathya's husband.
- Mersheena Neenu as Sathyapriya "Sathya" Sudheep – A tomboyish mechanic; Vimala's younger daughter; Divya's sister; Sudhi's wife.

=== Recurring ===
- Santhosh Kurup as Chandradas – Satheesh, Sujitha, Sudhi and Seetha's father
- Anila Sreekumar / Yamuna Mahesh as Vimala – Divya and Sathya's mother
- Ardra Das as Divyaprabha aka Divya – Vimala's elder daughter; Sathya's sister; Sudhi's ex fiancée' Rahul's former love interest
- Omana Ouseph as Divya and Sathya's grandmother
- Sangeetha Sivan as Sujitha Baiju – Chandradas's elder daughter; Satheesh, Sudhi and Seetha's sister; Baiju's wife
- Naveen Arakkal as Baiju – Pooja's brother; Sujitha's husband
- Fazal Razi as Satheesh Chandra – Chandradas's elder son; Sujitha, Sudhi and Seetha's brother
- Anumol as Seetha Chandra – Chandradas's younger daughter; Satheesh, Sujitha and Sudhi's sister
- Mithun as Rahul – Divya's former love interest
- Ranjith Raj as Abhijith – Sudhi's business rival; Lavanya's husband; Divya's murderer
- Arun Mohan as Cleetus Joseph
- Midhun Satheesh as Natholi – Sathya's best friend
- Shobhi Thilakan as Padhmanabhan/ Pappan/kochachan - Sathya's uncle
- Souparnika Subhash as Pooja (Baiju's sister)
- Achu B Kumar
- Sachin Joseph as Ikru
- Akshay Mohan
- Alis Christy as Abhijith's wife
- Thirumala Ramachandran as Vaidyar
- Boban Alummoodan as Sathya's father

=== Guest appearance ===
- Amala Gireesan as Kalyani
- Stebin Jacob as Valiyakunju (Anand Krishnan)
- Shiju as Ravi Varman
- Arun.G.Raghav as Abhimanyu

== Adaptations ==
Language	Title	Original release	Network(s)	Last aired	Notes
Odia	Sindura Bindu ସିନ୍ଦୁର ବିନ୍ଦୁ	7 March 2015	Zee Sarthak	15 February 2020	Original
Bengali	Bokul Kotha বকুল কথা	4 December 2017	Zee Bangla	1 February 2020	Remake
Tamil	Sathya சத்யா	4 March 2019	Zee Tamil	24 October 2021	Remake
Telugu	Suryakantham సూర్యకాంతం	22 July 2019	Zee Telugu	9 November 2024	Remake
Malayalam	Sathya Enna Penkutty സത്യാ എന്ന പെൺകുട്ടി	18 November 2019	Zee Keralam	17 April 2021	Remake
Kannada	Sathya ಸತ್ಯ	7 December 2020	Zee Kannada	10 August 2024	Remake
Hindi	Meet: Badlegi Duniya Ki Reet मीत: बदलेगी दुनिया की रीत	23 August 2021	Zee TV	14 November 2023	Remake
Marathi	Shiva शिवा	12 February 2024	Zee Marathi	8 August 2025	Remake
