= Chhotolok =

Indian Bengali-language web series

- Chhotolok Poster
- Genre: Suspense Thriller
- Created by: Indranil Roychowdhury
- Screenplay by: Sugata Sinha, Indranil Roychowdhury
- Directed by: Indranil Roychowdhury
- Starring: Indrani Haldar; Daminee Benny Basu; Gaurav Chakrabarty; Priyanka Sarkar; Ushasie Chakraborty; Ushasi Ray
- Music by: Gaurab Gaboo Chatterjee
- Country of origin: India
- Original language: Bengali
- No. of episodes: 9

Production
- Executive producer: Samar Ray
- Producers: Patralika Mukherjee, Soumya Mukhopadhyay, Anasua Roychoudhury
- Editor: Amit Ray

Original release
- Network: ZEE5
- Release: 3 November 2023

Chhotolok is Bengali crime thriller drama web series starring Indrani Haldar, Daminee Benny Basu, Gaurav Chakrabarty, Priyanka Sarkar, Ushashi Ray, Pratik Dutta and Ushasie Chakraborty. It was created and directed by Indranil Roychowdhury. It is also the director's first web series.

== Plot ==
Desperate to come out of a failing marriage, a married man gets into a whirlwind affair with a glamorous woman who has a criminal past, but ends up as the prime accused when she is murdered. The case falls into a timid but determined cop who unearths a deep buried scandal about the man's family involving his politically affiliated mother.

== Cast ==
- Indrani Haldar as Mohor Bhattacharya: A political leader.
- Damini Benny Basu as Sabitri Mondol: Sub-Inspector of Gajipur Police Station; Investigator of the murder case of Rupsha Ghosh.
- Gaurav Chakrabarty as Raja Bhattacharya: An engineer; Mohor's son; Mallika's husband.
- Priyanka Sarkar as Mallika Das: An accountant; Raja's wife.
- Ushasi Ray as Rupsha Ghosh: Model cum actor; Mallika's ex colleague.
- Ushasie Chakraborty as Kasturi Guha: A chartered accountant, who rules many "big fishes".
- Debesh Chattopadhyay as Tanmay Bagchi: A political leader, MLA; Mohor Bhattacharya's rival.
- Loknath Dey as Farooq.
- Joydip Mukherjee as Aditya Bhattacharya: Mohor's husband; Raja's father.
- Sumeet Samaddar as Madhusudan: Mohor's younger brother.
- Jeet Sundar Chakrabarty as Basudev Das aka Basu.
- Pratik Dutta as Jamil Sheikh: Junior of Sabitri.
- Tapasya Dasgupta as Pushpo: Putul and Basu's mother.
- Suvrajit Dutta as Rudra Mondal: A medicine shop keeper; Sabitri's husband.

== Episodes ==
Series	Episodes	Originally released	
Series	Episodes	First released	Last released
1	9	3 November 2023	TBA

=== Season 1 (2023) ===
No.	Title	Directed by	Written by	Original release date	Length (Minutes)
1	"A Respectable Residential Complex"	Indranil Roychowdhury	Sugata Sinha, Indranil Roychowdhury	3 November 2023	30 Minutes
A young woman is found dead in her apartment. Sub Inspector Sabitri Mondal and ASI Jamil Sheikh from the Gazitala Police Station are assigned to the case.
2	"An Open And Shut Case"	Indranil Roychowdhury	Sugata Sinha, Indranil Roychowdhury	3 November 2023	30 Minutes
The police arrest the victim's secret lover, but he denies committing the crime. Is he telling the truth?
3	"The Little Mercies of an Antacid"	Indranil Roychowdhury	Sugata Sinha, Indranil Roychowdhury	3 November 2023	30 Minutes
The interrogation continues as the police dive deep into Raja Bhattacharya's past. They find more details about his family and a brief affair with Rupsa.
4	"Darling, Come to Me"	Indranil Roychowdhury	Sugata Sinha, Indranil Roychowdhury	3 November 2023	30 Minutes
The police start interrogating Mallika and find out about Rupsa's double life. An unnatural death from Mohor's past resurfaces.
5	"Patiala to Patuli"	Indranil Roychowdhury	Sugata Sinha, Indranil Roychowdhury	3 November 2023	30 Minutes
Rupsa's murder case goes to court. Raja's married life comes to the forefront. Police start investigating the stories and plots surrounding the murder.
6	"City of Dogs"	Indranil Roychowdhury	Sugata Sinha, Indranil Roychowdhury	3 November 2023	30 Minutes
An unexpected meeting of two old acquaintances reveals further details about the Bhattacharya family's murky past.
7	"A Big Fish"	Indranil Roychowdhury	Sugata Sinha, Indranil Roychowdhury	3 November 2023	30 Minutes
Madhu gets a reality check, and more skeletons from the past tumble out. The investigation leads the police to an influential person.
8	"An Undelivered Package"	Indranil Roychowdhury	Sugata Sinha, Indranil Roychowdhury	3 November 2023	30 Minutes
Sub Inspector Sabitri Mondal is about to take a chance that could potentially end her career. What will her next step be?
9	"Egg Mutton Roll"	Indranil Roychowdhury	Sugata Sinha, Indranil Roychowdhury	3 November 2023	30 Minutes
Familiar faces emerge in unfamiliar territories as Sabitri wraps up the case. But is the case really solved?

== Production ==
Director Indranil Roychowdhury started shooting for the show in October 2022 after a year of scripting and workshops with his actors.

== Marketing ==
The show was officially announced by ZEE5 on December 11, 2022. Following that, a teaser poster of the show was first revealed on Jun 8, 2023. The trailer of the show was launched on October 12, 2023.

== Reception ==
The show drew positive reactions across board from critics. The Indian Express call it "Bengal's best web series" rating it 4 out of 5. OTTPlay commented, "Chhotolok is one of the finest Bengali content available in India in the OTT space."
