= Ayush Anand =

Indian television actor

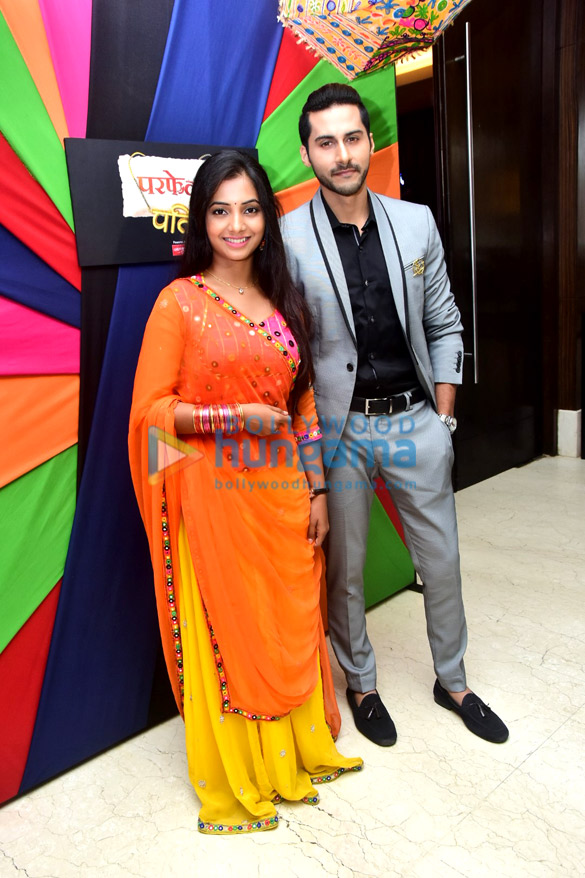
- Born: Delhi India
- Occupation: Actor
- Years active: 2015–present
- Known for: Ishqbaaaz, Tu Sooraj, Main Saanjh, Piyaji, Balika Vadhu

Ayush Anand is an Indian television actor. He has acted in television shows like Ishqbaaaz, Tu Sooraj, Main Saanjh, Piyaji on StarPlus and Balika Vadhu on Colors TV.

== Early life and education ==
Anand attended Springdales Public School New Delhi. He received his Bachelor of Business Administration degree from the Guru Nanak Institute of Management and Information Technology New Delhi in Delhi. He started working from his college days. He had done theatre and street plays with Kabira Art Theatre, Delhi and founded the group with his college friends. He worked in the Tanzil Theatre Group (later changed to Bhaav Arts of Expression) for three years.

== Television ==
Year	Serial	Role	Ref(s)	Note
2015	Jodha Akbar	Abdul Rahim Khan-i-Khana		
2016	Naagarjuna – Ek Yoddha			
2016	Balika Vadhu	Premal Singh		Main Antagonist
2016–2017	Ishqbaaaz	Ranveer Randhawa		Main Antagonist
2017	Dil Boley Oberoi	Ranveer Randhawa		Main Antagonist
2017–2018	Tu Sooraj, Main Saanjh, Piyaji	Aditya Modani		Main Antagonist
2018–2019	Perfect Pati	Pushkar Rathore		Main Antagonist
2019	Vish	Inspector Shekhar Malhotra		Main Antagonist
2020	Tujhse Hai Raabta	Trilok Marathe		Main Antagonist
2022–2023	Banni Chow Home Delivery	Viraj Singh Rathore		Main Antagonist
2023	Meet: Badlegi Duniya Ki Reet	Rajvardhan "Raj" Ahlawat		
2024	Mera Balam Thanedaar	Inspector Rana Chundawat		
2024	Ghum Hai Kisikey Pyaar Meiin	Chinmay Bhosle		
2024–2025	Deewaniyat	Rudra Hooda		
2026	Jhanak	Kaushik Mitra		
2026	Saru	Coach Rajat Patil		
