= Mera Balam Thanedaar =

2024 Indian Hindi TV series

- Genre: Soap Opera; Romance; Drama; Social
- Created by: Sumeet Hukamchand Mittal; Shashi Mittal
- Directed by: Mangesh Kanthale Vikram Labhe
- Starring: Shruti Choudhary; Shagun Pandey
- Country of origin: India
- Original language: Hindi
- No. of seasons: 1
- No. of episodes: 254

Production
- Producers: Sumeet Hukamchand Mittal; Shashi Mittal
- Production locations: Rajasthan; Mumbai
- Camera setup: Multi camera
- Running time: 20-22 minutes
- Production company: Shashi Sumeet Productions

Original release
- Network: Colors TV
- Release: 3 January – 20 December 2024

Mera Balam Thanedaar is an Indian Hindi-language television series produced by Shashi Sumeet Productions. It is an official remake of Colors Marathi series Raja Ranichi Ga Jodi and starred Shagun Pandey and Shruti Choudhary. It premiered on 3 January 2024 to 20 December 2024 on Colors TV.

== Premise ==
The story revolves around two individuals with contrasting morals: Bulbul Rajawat, a spirited teenager who believes that lying for a greater good is an act of kindness, and IPS Veer Pratap "Veer" Singh, a police officer who despises lies and is dedicated to combating the treacherous underage marriage practice in his community. Veer and Bulbul are forced to marry each other under certain circumstances. Bulbul learns a horrifying truth that she is underage after their marriage. Now she needs to hide the truth and protect Veer and their families, and fulfill her responsibilities as a wife and daughter-in-law.

== Cast ==
=== Main ===
- Shruti Choudhary as Undercover Agent Bulbul Rajawat Singh: Devendra and Geeta's younger daughter; Drishti and Amber's sister; Veer's wife
- Shagun Pandey as IPS Veerpratap "Veer" Singh: Chandrakant and Rati's son; Vardhan and Sulakshana's adopted son; Vishesh, Vaani, Vansh and Vayu's adopted brother; Bulbul's husband

=== Recurring ===
- Srishti Singh as Drishti Rajawat Singh: Devendra and Geeta's elder daughter; Amber and Bulbul's sister; Vishesh's second wife; Varnika's step-mother
- Rishi Khurana as Devendra Rajawat: Patriarch of the Rajawat family; Geeta's husband; Drishti, Amber and Bulbul's father; Varnika's step-grandfather
- Aastha Chaudhary as Geeta Rajawat: Bulbul, Drishti and Amber's mother; Devendra's wife; Drishti, Amber and Bulbul's mother; Varnika's step-grandmother
- Jeevansh Chaddha as Amber Rajawat: Devendra and Geeta's son; Drishti and Bulbul's brother
- Rajendra Chawla as Vardhan Singh: Patriarch of the Singh family; Sulakshana's husband; Vishesh, Vani, Vansh and Vayu's father; Veer’s adoptive father; Vyom and Varnika’s grandfather
- Supriya Shukla as Sulakshana Singh: Vardhan's wife; Vishesh, Vani, Vansh and Vayu's mother; Veer’s adoptive mother; Vyom and Varnika’s grandmother
- Vijay Bhatia / Puneet Tejwani as Vishesh Singh: Vardhan and Sulakshana's eldest son; Vani, Vansh and Vayu's brother; Veer's adopted brother; Drishti's husband; Varnika's father
- Honeyy Soni as Varnika Singh: Vishesh’s daughter; Vyom’s cousin
- Anuja Walhe as Vani Singh Jain: Vardhan and Sulakshana's daughter; Vishesh, Vansh and Vayu's sister; Veer's adopted sister; Siddharth's wife; Vyom's mother
- Raghav Gosain as Dr. Siddharth "Sid" Jain: Vaani's husband; Vyom's father
- Nirbhay Thakur as Vyom Jain: Vani and Siddharth's son; Varnika's cousin
- Sagar Parekh as Vansh Singh: Vardhan and Sulakshana's long-lost second son; Vishesh, Vani and Vayu's brother; Veer's adopted brother
- Prateek Singh Parihar as Vayu Singh: Vardhan and Sulakshana's youngest son; Vishesh, Vani and Vansh's brother; Veer's adopted brother Varnika and Vyom's uncle
- Siddharth Dhanda as Ratan Chauhan: Mangal's son; Bulbul's ex-fiancé
- Rajani Gupta as Kaveri
- Prapti Shukla as Rashi
- Ankita Tiwari as Sneha: Bulbul's friend
- Maitri Bhanushali as Divya: Bulbul's friend
- Mohit Parmar as Advocate Rudra Chaudhary
- Neelu Vaghela as Bhavani Chundawat: Matriarch of the Chundawat family; Rajat and Rana's mother; enemy of the Singh family; Ratan's sponsor
- Ayush Anand as Inspector Rana Chundawat: Bhavani's younger son; Rajat's younger brother; Veer's enemy
- Devish Ahuja as Avinash Malhotra: Varnika's and other girls blackmailer (Dead)
- Mehul Nisar as Jeevraj Shekhawat: Avinash's murderer
- Barkha Bisht as Meethi Mai
- Ashita Dhawan as Sampoorna

== Adaptations ==
Language	Title	Original release	Network(s)	Last aired	Notes
Marathi	Raja Ranichi Ga Jodi राजा राणीची गं जोडी	18 December 2019	Colors Marathi	12 November 2022	Original
Tamil	Sillunu Oru Kaadhal சில்லுனு ஒரு காதல்	4 January 2021	Colors Tamil	28 October 2022	Remake
Gujarati	Sorath Ni Mrs. Singham સોરઠની મિસિસ સિંઘમ	24 January 2022	Colors Gujarati	4 November 2023	Remake
