= Anusha Hegde =

Indian actress and choreographer

- Born: 5 September
- Occupations: Actress, choreographer
- Years active: 2016–present
- Known for: Radha Ramana; Ninne Pelladatha; Suryakantham; Anandha Ragam

Anusha Hegde is an Indian actress and choreographer known for her work in Kannada, Telugu, and Tamil-language television shows and films.

== Early life and career ==
Anusha Hegde was born to a Tulu family in Puttur,Mangalore Region. Her father Umesh Hegde was formerly a theatre artist. She completed a course in Yakshagana, the vidwat exam for Bharatanatyam, a master's in commerce and a master of arts in dance. She was also an athlete in college. She completed the Karnataka Public Service Commission exam and was on track to become an IPS when the editor of the Kannada serial Radha Ramana of Colors TV chanced upon her photos. She played Deepika, a negative role, in the serial. She received an offer to act in a Kannada mythological serial but since she acted in another serial for a Kannada channel prior, she was not allowed to accept the offer and shifted her focus to Hyderabad for Telugu serials.

She also played lead roles in the Telugu serials Ninne Pelladatha as Mansi and in Suryakantham as DCP Suryakantam. From 2022 to 2026, she played as ACP Eshwari in Anandha Ragam, making her debut in Tamil television. In 2025, she also played as Thulasi, a lookalike character of her onscreen character Eshwari. Currently, she is seen portraying as IAS Pallavi in Udaya TV serial Anu Pallavi.

== Personal life ==
Her father is a businessman. Her mother Swarnalatha does counseling for woman and children. She has a younger sister and younger brother. Her husband Pratap Singh is a Telugu serial actor for Gemini TV and acted in the film Bewars (2018). They met on the sets of Ninne Pelladatha and got engaged in 2019.

== Filmography ==
- Note: all films are in Kannada, unless otherwise noted.

| Year | Title | Role | Notes | scope="col" |

=== Television ===
| Year | Title | Role | Network | Language | Notes |
|---|---|---|---|---|---|
| 2017–2019 | Radha Ramana | Deepika | Colors Kannada | Kannada | Debut |
| 2018 | Ninne Pelladatha | Mansi | Zee Telugu | Telugu | Lead role |
| 2019–2024 | Suryakantham | DCP Suryakantham aka Surya and Rangamma | Zee Telugu | Telugu | Lead role |
| 2022–2026 | Anandha Ragam | ACP Eshwari "Esh" Azhagu Sundaram and Thulasi | Sun TV | Tamil | Lead role |
| 2025–2026 | Anu Pallavi | IAS Pallavi | Udaya TV | Kannada | Lead role |
| 2026–Present | Kurinji | Akila | Sun TV | Tamil | Lead role |

== Awards ==
| Year | Award | Category | Work | Result |
|---|---|---|---|---|
| 2019 | Zee Telugu Kutumbam Awards | Zee Super Girl Award | Suryakantham | Won |
| 2021 | Zee Telugu Kutumbam Awards | Mondi Mogudu Penki Pellam | Suryakantham | Won |
| 2022 | Zee Telugu Kutumbam Awards | Zee Telugu Velugu | Suryakantham | Won |
| 2023 | Sun Kudumbam Viruthugal | Sirandha Sagothari | Anandha Ragam | Won |
| 2023 | Sun Kudumbam Viruthugal | Athiradi Nayagi | Anandha Ragam | Won |
| 2025 | Sun Kudumbam Viruthugal | Sirandha Sagothari | Anandha Ragam | Won |
