= Raja Ranichi Ga Jodi =

2019 Indian Marathi language TV series

- Genre: Soap opera Drama
- Screenplay by: Chinmay Mandlekar; Dialogues; Prasad Kumthekar
- Directed by: Swapnil Varake; Vinod Lavekar
- Starring: See below
- Composer: Rohan-Rohan
- Country of origin: India
- Original language: Marathi
- No. of episodes: 841

Production
- Producers: Vinod Lavekar; Nikhil Sheth
- Camera setup: Multi-camera
- Running time: 22 minutes
- Production company: Potadi Entertainment

Original release
- Network: Colors Marathi
- Release: 18 December 2019 – 12 November 2022

Raja Ranichi Ga Jodi (transl. Like a Pair of King and Queen) is an Indian Marathi language television series which aired on Colors Marathi. It starred Maniraj Pawar and Shivani Sonar in lead roles. It premiered from 18 December 2019 and ended on 12 November 2022 completing 841 episodes. The show is written by Chinmay Mandlekar.

== Plot ==
Sanjivani lives with her parents and her two elder sisters. The eldest of which is married and pregnant, but stays in the house along with her husband. Her father Panjabrao has lots of debt hanging over his head. He is a miser and cunning man who tries to exploit money from people, even from Sanjivani's in-laws. He took a loan from Aabasaheb Dhale-Patil for his middle daughter Swarangi's foreign education, but Aabasaheb makes an agreement with Panjabrao that after his daughter Swarangi returns from foreign, she has to marry his younger son Ranjit Dhale-Patil, who is an IPS Officer.

At the same time, Sanjivani is running her own secret business with her friend Moni called "Kalyani Papad Udyog" to help her family financially. Ranjit catches Sanjivani while breaking the traffic rules. She lies and tells him that her brother is in hospital. Actually, Ranjit is on the way to meet her elder sister Swarangi for discussion of marriage. Ranjit gets to know that Sanjivani and Swarangi are sisters and they do not have a brother. After some days, Sanjivani and Ranjit are compelled to marry under circumstances. Their marriage ends up in a pickle when it is found out that Sanjivani was not of legal age when she got married at 17, and that the year of her true birthdate of 18 September 2002 was fraudulently falsified to 2001 by her father for that reason.

== Cast ==
=== Main ===
- Maniraj Pawar as Ranjit Shivajirao Dhale-Patil
- Shivani Sonar as Sanjivani Panjabrao Bandal / Sanjivani Ranjit Dhale-Patil

=== Recurring ===
- Shubhangi Gokhale as Kusumavati Shivajirao Dhale-Patil (Aaisaheb); Shivajirao's widow; Ajit, Ranjit, Sujit's mother and Baby Maushi's elder sister
- Kalyani Chaudhari as Kalyani Panjabrao Bandal; Sanjivani's mother
- Shrikant Yadav as Panjabrao Rajvardhan Bandal; Sanjivani's father
- Rashmi Joshi as Swarangi Panjabrao Bandal; Sanjivani's sister
- Shweta Kharat / Aishwarya Shinde as Monika Sudamrao Latthe / Monika Sujit Dhale-Patil (Moni); Sanjivani's friend and Sujit's second wife
- Shruti Atre as Rajashree Ajit Dhale-Patil (Vahinisaheb); Dadasaheb's second wife
- Gargi Phule-Thatte as Lilavati Shelamkar (Baby Maushi); Ajit, Ranjit and Sujit's aunt and Kusumavati's younger sister
- Apurva Kadam as Sajiri Panjabrao Bandal; Sanjivani's sister
- Ajay Purkar / Shailesh Korade as Ajit Shivajirao Dhale-Patil (Dadasaheb); Shivajirao and Kusumavati's elder son; Ranjit & Sujit's brother; Avantika's widower; Rajashree's husband and Jadoo's biological father
- Parth Ghatge as Sujit Shivajirao Dhale-Patil; Ranjit's brother
- Ankita Nikrad as Aparna More / Aparna Sujit Dhale-Patil; Sujit's first wife
- Vidya Sawale as Inspector Gulab Shyamrao Bhosale

== Adaptations ==
Language	Title	Original release	Network(s)	Last aired	Notes
Marathi	Raja Ranichi Ga Jodi राजा राणीची गं जोडी	18 December 2019	Colors Marathi	12 November 2022	Original
Tamil	Sillunu Oru Kaadhal சில்லுனு ஒரு காதல்	4 January 2021	Colors Tamil	28 October 2022	Remake
Gujarati	Sorath Ni Mrs. Singham સોરઠની મિસિસ સિંઘમ	24 January 2022	Colors Gujarati	4 November 2023	Remake
Hindi	Mera Balam Thanedaar मेरा बालम थानेदार	3 January 2024	Colors TV	20 December 2024	Remake
