= Ushasi Ray =

Indian TV actress (born 1993)

Ushasi Roy
- Born: Kolkata, West Bengal, India
- Education: Kamala Girls' High School
- Alma mater: Asutosh College
- Occupations: Actress; Model
- Years active: 2015–present
- Known for: Milon Tithi; Bokul Kotha; Kadambini

Ushasi Roy is an Indian television actress and model. She is best known for playing the lead roles in Star Jalsha's daily soaps Milon Tithi and Bokul Kotha. She also played the lead role in Zee Bangla's daily soap Kadambini. Roy made her web series debut with Turu Love, streamed on Hoichoi. She made her film debut with Iskaboner Rani, which was aired on Zee Bangla Cinema. She had also hosted few episodes of Zee Bangla Rannaghor.

== Career ==
Ushasi Ray started her career by playing the lead role in Star Jalsha's popular show Milon Tithi opposite to Jeetu Kamal. Then, she played a cameo role on Star Jalsha's Detective Show Jai Kali Kalkattawali. She also played the lead role in Zee Bangla's high ranking serial Bokul Kotha opposite to Honey Bafna. She also played the lead role in Zee Bangla's Kadambini opposite to Manoj Ojha. Her debut movie is "Ishkaboner rani" She also debut in web series name "Turu love" She also appeared in 2 more web series named "Byomkesh season 7(Chorabali) and Rudrabinar obhishaap as a Cameo. Her web series Sunderban er Vidyasagar is a unique project. Her recent Web series "Gobhir jwoler Maach".

== Web series ==
Year	Title	Role	Notes	Channel	Ref
2021	Turu Love	Brinda Chatterjee	Lead Role	Hoichoi	
2021	Byomkesh Chorabali	Iman Devi	One of the main role	Hoichoi	
2021	Rudrabinar Obhishaap	Mumtaz	Cameo role	Hoichoi	
2022	Sundarbaner Vidyasaagar	Parvati	Lead Role	Hoichoi	
2023	Gobhir Joler Maach	Bishakha	One of the Lead Role	Hoichoi	
2023	Kumudini Bhaban		One of the Lead Role	Hoichoi	
2023	Chhotolok	Rupsa	One of the Leads	ZEE5	

== Soap operas ==
Year	Title	Role	Notes	Channel	Ref
2015 - 2017	Milon Tithi	Ahona Mallick / Meera	Lead Role	Star Jalsha	
2017	Jai Kali Kalkattawali	Muniya	Episodic Role (Negative)	Star Jalsha	
2017 - 2020	Bokul Kotha	Bokul Roy (Bokul Sanyal)	Lead Role	Zee Bangla	
2020	Kadambini	Kadambini Ganguly	Lead Role	Zee Bangla	
2024–2026	Grihoprobesh	Subhalaxmi Ray	Lead Role	Star Jalsha	

== Television movies ==
Year	Title	Role	Notes	Language	Channel	Ref.
2021	Iskaboner Rani	Laxmi	Lead Role	Bengali	Zee Bangla Originals	

== Awards & Recognition ==
Year	Award Name	Category	Role	Notes
2017	Star jalsha Parivaar Award	Priyo Mishti Somporko	Ahona	Milon Tithi
2018	Zee Bangla Sonar Sansar	Sera Meye	Bokul	Bokul Kotha
2019	Zee Bangla Sonar Sansar	Sera Nayika	Bokul	Bokul Kotha
2019	Kolkata Glitz	Icon Of the year (Female)	Ushasi Ray	Bokul Kotha
2020	Zee Bangla Sonar Sansar	Sera Bouma	Bokul	Bokul Kotha
2024	Star jalsha Parivaar Award	Star Bouma	Shubholokkhi	Grihoprobesh
2025	Tele Academy Awards 2025	Priyo Bou	Shubholokkhi	Grihoprobesh
2026	Star jalsha Parivaar Award	Priyo Boudi	Shubholokkhi	Grihoprobesh
2026	Star jalsha Parivaar Award	Star Bouma	Shubholokkhi	Grihoprobesh

== Mahalaya ==
Year	Serial	Character	Channel	Notes
2018	Shaktirupeno	Devi Baramchandi	Zee Bangla	
2019	12 Mashe 12 Rupe Debibaran	Devi Kamakhya	Zee Bangla	
2020	Durga Saptasati Sanbhavami Yuge Yuge	Devi Satakshi	Zee Bangla	
2021	Nabarupe Mahadurga	Devi Kushmanda	Colors Bangla	
