= Inti Guttu (TV series) =

Telugu language TV series (2020-2022)

- Also known as: Intiguttu
- Genre: Family; Drama
- Written by: Dialogues; Narendra Kumar yenuganti
- Story by: Sanjeev Megoti
- Directed by: Ramu
- Starring: Shishir Shastry; Nisarga Gowda; Meena Vasu
- Music by: Rakesh Muthyam
- Country of origin: India
- Original language: Telugu
- No. of episodes: 640

Production
- Producer: N Saibaba
- Cinematography: Santhosh Kotla
- Editor: Srinivas Goodupalli

Original release
- Network: Zee Telugu
- Release: 30 November 2020 – 17 December 2022

Related
- Tujhse Hai Raabta

Inti Guttu is an Indian Telugu language family and Drama series airing on Zee Telugu from 30 November 2020 and ended on 17 December 2022. It is the remake of Hindi Television series Tujhse Hai Raabta which aired on Zee TV. It stars Shishir Shastry, Nisarga Gowda and Meena Vasu in lead roles.

== Synopsis ==
Kalyani, a teenager, loses her cherished mother Madhuri and is compelled to live with her step-mother Anupama. How they develop a deep unconventional bond beyond the ties of blood forms the storyline.

== Cast ==
=== Main ===
- Rohit Rangaswamy (2020) / Shishir Shastry (2020-2022) as Showrya; Sampada and Kalyani's husband; Dhamyanthi's son
- Nisarga Gowda as Kalyani; Ajay and Madhuri's biological daughter; Anupama's foster daughter
- Meena Vasu as Anupama; Ajay's wife; Kalyani's foster mother

=== Recurring ===
- Sai Kiran / Kaushik Srikrishna as Ajay; Anupama and Madhuri's husband; Kalyani's father.
- Shiva Parvathi as Shiva Parvathi; Ajay, Chinny krishna and Dhamayanthi's mother
- Malladi Shivanarayana as Bhupathi; Shiva Parvathi's Husband; Ajay, Chinny krishna and Dhamayanthi's father
- Hemanth as Siddarth; Sampada's lover
- Rithu Chowdary as Sampada; Showrya's first wife and Siddarth's lover
- Rajitha as Dhamayanthi; Showrya's mother
- Lakshmi Narayana as Showrya's father
- Charishma Naidu as Pallavi
- Girish as Chinny Krishna, Pallavi's husband, Shiva Parvathi's Younger Son
- Challa Chandu as Advocate
- Uma Naidu as Siddarth's mother
- Suhan Ghori as Jai, Kalyani's boss and her former senior at college
- Neema Singh as Unknown
- Nata Kumari as Unknown

=== Cameo appearance ===
- Roopa Shravan as Madhuri
- Jabardasth Naveen as himself
- Anusha Prathap as Surya
- Ashika padukone as Trinayani

== Adaptations ==
Language	Title	Original release	Network(s)	Last aired	Notes
Hindi	Tujhse Hai Raabta तुझसे हैं राब्ता	3 September 2018	Zee TV	31 July 2021	Original
Telugu	Inti Guttu ఇంటి గుట్టు	30 November 2020	Zee Telugu	17 December 2022	Remake
Tamil	Kannathil Muthamittal கன்னத்தில் முத்தமிட்டால்	11 April 2022	Zee Tamil	20 May 2023	Remake
Malayalam	Valsalyam വാത്സല്യം	25 March 2024	Zee Keralam	Ongoing	Remake
Marathi	Krishna Rattimo कृष्ण रात्तीमो	TBA	Zee Marathi	Upcoming	Remake
