= Rannaghor =

Indian cooking show

- Genre: Cooking show
- Presented by: Sudipa Chatterjee (2005–2018; 2020–2022); Ushasi Ray (Weekend episodes only, 2020–2022); Aparajita Auddy (2018–2020); Sneha Chatterjee Bhowmik (Weekend episodes only, 2017–2018); Sonali Chowdhury (Weekend episodes only, 2005–2017); Koneenica Banerjee (2024-2026)
- Opening theme: Zee Banglar Rannaghor
- Country of origin: India
- Original language: Bengali
- No. of episodes: 5268

Production
- Camera setup: Multi-camera
- Running time: 22 minutes

Original release
- Network: Zee Bangla
- Release: 9 May 2005 – 27 June 2026

Rannaghar (transl. The Kitchen Room) is a Bengali language cooking show which aired on Zee Bangla. The show was hosted by Sudipa Chatterjee.

Rannaghar has become one of the longest running and most popular cookery shows on Bengali television. After a successful journey of 17 and a half years, which started on 9 May 2005, it went off-air on 31 December 2022 and was replaced by Ghore Ghore Zee Bangla, which premiered on 2 January 2023. The show resumed its telecast on 30 September 2024 and completed 102 episodes on 1 February 2025.

Some episodes were hosted by other personalities, including Sonali Chowdhury, Sneha Chatterjee Bhowmik, Ushasi Ray and Manali Dey. On certain occasions, episodes were also hosted by Ushashi Ray and Geetasri Roy.

It premiered in the year 2005, making it the longest-running Indian Bengali television series to date and the third longest-running Indian television series. The series celebrated its 16th anniversary on 9 May 2022.

Ushasi Ray first hosted the series in the Pohela Boishakh Special Episode 2021. Since then, she has hosted multiple episodes of the show, eventually hosting more episodes than Sudipa Chatterjee. From 24 January 2022, actress Tiyasha Lepcha started hosting special episodes of the show. During Rathyatra 2022, actress Sriparna Roy hosted a few episodes titled "Rathyatra Special".

After an unsuccessful run of the show Randhane Bandhan hosted by Gaurav Chakrabarty and Ridhima Ghosh, the show, which was eventually being hosted by Koneenica Banerjee, finally went off-air in 2026, only to be replaced by another revamped cookery show named Shashuri Boumar Rannaghor, hosted by Biswanath Basu.

== Guest appearances ==
Many eminent figures of Bengal including Sourav Ganguly, Raja Narayan Deb, Srabanti Chatterjee, Tanusree Chakraborty, Koel Mallick, Usha Uthup, Rachana Banerjee, Subhashree Ganguly, Adrit Roy, Rukmini Maitra, Nusrat Jahan, Supriya Devi, Sabitri Chatterjee and many others have appeared in the show.
