= Suryakantham (TV series) =

2019 Indian Telugu language TV series

- Genre: Drama
- Starring: Anusha Hegde; Prajwal PD
- Country of origin: India
- Original language: Telugu
- No. of episodes: 1559

Production
- Production locations: Hyderabad, Telangana
- Camera setup: Multi-camera
- Running time: 22 minutes

Original release
- Network: Zee Telugu
- Release: 22 July 2019 – 9 November 2024

Related
- Sindura Bindu

Suryakantham is an Indian Telugu language drama series airing on Zee Telugu which premiered from 22 July 2019 to 9 November 2024. The show is an official remake of Odia TV series Sindura Bindu. It stars Anusha Hegde and Prajwal PD in lead roles.

== Plot ==
An unexpected turn of events drives Surya, a tomboy, to marry Chaitanya, a rich man adored by his three elder sisters who do not approve of Surya.

== Cast ==
=== Main ===
- Anusha Hegde as Suryakantham aka Surya
- Prajwal PD as Chaitanya aka Chaitu

=== Recurring ===
- Hari Garu as Dhanunjay
- Manasa Narayan as Teja / Kranti
  - Pooja Sri as Child Teja
- Gayathri as Pooja
  - Yaadvi Sri as Child Pooja
- Kaushik Rama Patali as Kalyan
- Sahithi as Lalitha
- Mrudula as Purnima
- Sandya Rani as Pragati
- Prabhakar as Puli
- Mounika Guntuka as Pramila
- Teja Chowdary as Babji

== Adaptations ==
Language	Title	Original release	Network(s)	Last aired	Notes
Odia	Sindura Bindu ସିନ୍ଦୁର ବିନ୍ଦୁ	7 March 2015	Zee Sarthak	15 February 2020	Original
Bengali	Bokul Kotha বকুল কথা	4 December 2017	Zee Bangla	1 February 2020	Remake
Tamil	Sathya சத்யா	4 March 2019	Zee Tamil	24 October 2021	Remake
Telugu	Suryakantham సూర్యకాంతం	22 July 2019	Zee Telugu	9 November 2024	Remake
Malayalam	Sathya Enna Penkutty സത്യാ എന്ന പെൺകുട്ടി	18 November 2019	Zee Keralam	17 April 2021	Remake
Kannada	Sathya ಸತ್ಯ	7 December 2020	Zee Kannada	10 August 2024	Remake
Hindi	Meet: Badlegi Duniya Ki Reet मीत: बदलेगी दुनिया की रीत	23 August 2021	Zee TV	14 November 2023	Remake
Marathi	Shiva शिवा	12 February 2024	Zee Marathi	8 August 2025	Remake
