= Meet: Badlegi Duniya Ki Reet =

Indian drama television series

- Genre: Drama
- Created by: Shashi Mittal
- Screenplay by: Girish Dhamija
- Story by: Seema Mantri
- Directed by: Vaibhav Singh; Pushkar Pandit; Avinash Kumar
- Creative director: Shweta Bishnoi
- Starring: Shagun Pandey; Ashi Singh; Syed Raza Ahmed
- Opening theme: "Yeh Meet Hai, Yeh Meet Hai"
- Composer: Ashish Rego
- Country of origin: India
- Original language: Hindi
- No. of seasons: 2
- No. of episodes: 769

Production
- Producers: Sumeet Hukamchand Mittal; Shashi Mittal; Jitendra Singla
- Cinematography: Ajay Lalta Gupta; Vipul Virendra Singh
- Editors: Shashank Harendra Singh; Ajay Saroj Singh
- Camera setup: Multi-camera
- Running time: 22 minutes
- Production company: Shashi Sumeet Productions

Original release
- Network: Zee TV
- Release: 23 August 2021 – 14 November 2023

Related
- Sindura Bindu

Meet: Badlegi Duniya Ki Reet (transl. Meet: will change the way of the world) is an Indian Hindi-language television drama series that premiered on 23 August 2021 on Zee TV and produced by Shashi Sumeet Productions. It originally starred Ashi Singh and Shagun Pandey. After a generation leap, it starred Syed Raza Ahmed and Ashi Singh (in a new avatar) as the second generation. It is a remake of Zee Sarthak's Sindura Bindu. The show went off air on 14 November 2023, completing its run of more than two years.

== Plot ==
Meet Hooda is a spirited girl from Haryana. Her father was a police officer who lost his life and Meet takes up all the responsibilities of her house. Meet Hooda meets Meet Ahlawat. Initially at loggerheads, they soon become friends. Ahlawat falls in love with Hooda's sister Manushi and their wedding is arranged. Due to misunderstandings, Ahlawat breaks his friendship with Meet. On the wedding day, Manushi runs away and marries Kunal leading Meet Hooda to marry Meet Ahlawat. No one's happy about this and Meet Ahlawat is unwilling to accept her as his wife. Eventually the Ahlawat family starts accepting Meet Hooda and Meet Ahlawat wishes to start a new life with her. But Manushi returns. Meet competes with her own sister to earn her own husband. Meet decides to join the police force and goes for police training and is designated as a sub-inspector. Meet Ahlawat supports her throughout.

She gets to know her father's killer is in the Ahlawat Mansion. There is a conflict in the house when everything leads up to her loving father-in-law getting arrested. Meet Hooda consoles her husband and they make love. But tensions rise up so much her husband tries to throw her out of the house if she doesn't leave her job. At the end Meet gets her innocent father-in-law out of jail and the family gets Meet Ahlawat back with her by tactics. Right then Meet's pregnancy is announced. The couple lives a happy time finally till Meet Ahlawat accidentally kisses his old friend hallucinating it was his wife. Meet is heartbroken. She goes into labor and she delivers a baby. Manushi kidnaps the newborn and she is told her baby was stillborn. A shattered Babita is manipulated by Masoom and she begs her to leave her son forever believing she can't carry a child again. Meet somehow discovers her baby is alive and has been kidnapped by Manushi. She rushes for her baby but Manushi burns down the place and Meet gets caught in it. Meet is presumed to be dead. On the other hand, she leaves a note for her husband that she is finally leaving because of his cheating.

=== 1 year later ===
Meet is in the form of Manjari Desai, who hails from Vadodara. She is all set to take seek revenge from Manushi, Kunal and Masoom for taking away her child. Meet Ahlawat hates Meet's memories now and has a rough exterior now. Soon the duo meet again and the story follows. They get Esha Ahlawat married again, to her love Deep, after all the drama and insults Meet Hooda had to tolerate even during Esha's first marriage. Esha accidentally kills Deep. Meet Hooda and Meet Ahlawat to lose their baby in a tragic accident where Meet Hooda's mother end up in coma. A raging Meet Ahlawat marries Deep's sister Neelam as a responsibility and to take revenge on Meet Hooda. But Meet Hooda refuses to leave her husband. With time he mellows down but his second wife gets angry. Neelam has a split personality disorder, the other her is called Laila. After lots of clashes Meet Hooda finally gets her husband back. They adopt a newborn. But Meet Ahlawat dies saving Meet Hooda's life in terrorist attack.

=== 1 year later ===
Meet Hooda comes to Sarkarpur to complete her dead husband's dream of a factory and employ female workers. But she gets caught up in the regressive Sarkar family, who doesn't want the factory as Sarkarpur believes women should not work; and instead take care of the family. In a turn of events she eventually marries Manmeet Sangwan, look–alike of Meet Ahlawat; even though he has a childhood sweetheart Shagun. Manmeet wanted to take revenge on Meet, he even tries to kill her. But they turn friends after events and now she is in love with him. Shagun tries to act as a thorn in Meet and Manmeet's relationship out of jealousy. Rajvardhan and Babita die in a car accident; and on Rajvardan's death bed he has asked Manmeet to take care of Meet. Later on conflict arises as Manmeet lied about Rajvardan and Babita's death; thus leading her to find out; then in a turn of events Manmeet believes Meet stabbed him with a knife (when in reality it was Shagun, growing more jealous). Manmeet is sent to the hospital and Sakar was trying to kill her, by asking Yashoda to shoot her, for supposedly attacking Manmeet. Thus Manmeet begs Meet to leave and never return; however Meet, goes in to disguise as a nurse, which Shagun hired to help meet, to find out what else is Shagun's plan, as Manmeet still has feelings for Meet.

Finally, it is revealed what happened and now Manmeet has forgiven Meet, but cannot bare to see Shagun leave. Thus, creating two sides where Manmeet has to choose between the two women he loves, either Meet or Shagun. Meet is supported by Yashoda (now sympathetic to Meet); and Shagun is supported by Sarkar, Gunwanti, and Mahendra. Then after a turn of events Manmeet chooses Meet; thus causing Shagun and Gunwanti (who is Shagun's elder sister) plan to get Manmeet to support Shagun but their plans backfires; thus causing Meet and Manmeet to grow closer. Then Shagun create more problems by involving her elder brother Nitin and when that starts to fail she tries to get run over, and then becomes blind, although she is faking, thus making Meet feel more guilty as Gunwanti and Nitin blame Meet for Shagun's accident. After a few months Shagun along with Nitin are finally caught and Yashoda kicks them out of the Sangwan house. Manmeet and Meet confess their feelings and consummate their marriage, soon after Meet is pregnant, Nitin, Shagun and Gunwanti plot to cause Meet's miscarriage. Sarkar vows to get Meet and Manmeet separated. At Meet's baby shower Shagun returns and it is revealed Shagun has gotten married and has given birth to her son. Meet gives birth to her and Manmeet's daughter Sumeet.

=== 5 years later ===
Meet and Manmeet's daughter Sumeet is shown. Meet has fulfilled her dead husband's dream of a factory in Sarkarpur due to Manmeet and the family's help. Meet's long lost son Chiku is shown meeting with Sumeet. Initially Meet and Manmeet investigate the death of an orphan and they meet Chiku. The minister's secretary Kanika enters and commits many crimes such as kidnapping Sumeet and trying to take Chiku but she and the minister are arrested. Meet reunites with her long lost son, Chiku. Meet and Manmeet name Chiku as Rajvardhan in the memory of Chiku's grandfather, Rajvardhan Ahlawat. Shagun again comes back into the lives of Meet and Manmeet to cause havoc and destruction including lying about Chiku's maternity. Sarkar, Gunwanti and Mahendra kidnap Meet and Sumeet and while saving Meet from Sarkar, Manmeet is shot dead. Also while saving Meet, Chiku kills Sarkar and Meet gives Sumeet's responsibility over to Chiku as she takes the blame for Sarkar's murder.

=== 20 years later ===
Sumeet is shown as an adult living with Rajvardhan "Cheeku" in the Ahlawat House. Shagun tries to avoid Sumeet because Sumeet might recognize her as she has already seen Shagun in her childhood.

== Cast ==
=== Main ===
- Ashi Singh as
  - Meet Hooda Sangwan: Anubha and Ashok's younger daughter; Manushi's sister; Meet Ahlawat and Manmeet's widow; Raj and Sumeet's mother (2021–2023)
  - Sumeet Sangwan Chaudhary: Meet and Manmeet's daughter; Raj's half-sister; Aarohi; Shlok's wife (2023)
    - Swarna Pandey as child Sumeet (2023)
- Shagun Pandey as
  - Meet Ahlawat: Rajvardhan and Babita's younger son; Masoom and Tej's brother; Meet Hooda's first husband; Raj's father (2021–2023)
  - Manmeet Sangwan: Meet Ahlawat's look-alike; Sarkar and Yashoda's second son; Mahendra and Narendra's brother; Meet's second husband; Shagun's ex-fiancé; Sumeet's father; Raj's step-father (2023)
- Syed Raza Ahmed as Shlok Chaudhary: Anand and Poonam's younger son; Rajeev's brother; Sumeet's husband (2023)
- Ayush Anand as Jr. Rajvardhan "Raj" Ahlawat: Meet Hooda and Meet Ahlawat's son; Manmeet's stepson; Sumeet's half-brother; Priyanka's husband (2023)
  - Vidhaan Sharma as child Rajvardhan "Chiku" Ahlawat (2023)
- Shubhangi Khotle as Priyanka Chaudhary Ahlawat: Ashok's younger daughter; Pankhuri's sister; Raj's wife (2023)

=== Recurring ===
==== Hoodas ====
- Abha Parmar as Mrs. Hooda: Ashok's mother; Manushi and Meet Hooda's grandmother; Raj and Sumeet's great-grandmother (2021–2023)
- Ravi Gossain as Inspector Ashok Hooda: Mrs. Hooda's son; Anubha's husband; Manushi and Meet Hooda's father; Raj and Sumeet's grandfather (2021)
- Vaishnavi Macdonald as Anubha Hooda: Ashok's widow; Manushi and Meet Hooda's mother; Raj and Sumeet's grandmother (2021–2022)
- Sharain Khanduja as Manushi Hooda: Anubha and Ashok's elder daughter; Meet Hooda's elder sister; Meet Ahlawat's former love interest; Kunal's ex-wife (2021–2022)

==== Ahlawats ====
- Sooraj Thapar as Rajvardhan Ahlawat: Ram's brother; Babita's husband; Masoom, Tej and Meet Ahlawat's father; Duggu, Raj and Vani's grandfather; Ram Jr. and Lakhan's adoptive grandfather (2021–2023)
- Sonica Handa as Babita Rana Ahlawat: Abhay's sister; Rajvardhan's wife; Masoom, Tej and Meet Ahlawat's mother; Duggu, Raj and Vani's grandmother; Ram Jr. and Lakhan's adoptive grandmother (2021–2023)
- Vishal Gandhi as Tej Ahlawat: Rajvardhan and Babita's elder son; Masoom and Meet Ahlawat's brother; Sunaina's husband; Jr. Ram and Lakhan's adoptive father (2021–2022)
- Riyanka Chanda as Sunaina Ahlawat: Jaypratap's daughter; Tej's wife; Jr. Ram and Lakhan's adoptive mother (2021–2023)
- Dhairya Dwivedi as Jr. Ram Ahlawat: Tej and Sunaina's elder adopted son; Lakhan's brother (2021–2022)
- Vaidik Poriya as Lakhan Ahlawat: Tej and Sunaina's younger adopted son; Jr. Ram's brother (2021–2022)
- Nisha Rawal as Masoom Ahlawat: Rajvardhan and Babita's daughter; Tej and Meet Ahlawat's sister; Hoshiyar's wife; Duggu and Vani's mother (2021–2022) / (2022–2023) / (2023)
- Adityarao Nuniwal as Hoshiyar: Chhavi's brother; Masoom's husband; Duggu and Vani's father (2021–2023)
- Het Makwana as child Duggu: Masoom and Hoshiyar's son; Vani's brother (2021–2023)
- Afzaal Khan as Ram Ahlawat: Rajvardhan's brother; Ragini's husband; Ishaani and Esha's father (2021–2023)
- Preeti Puri as Ragini Ahlawat: Ram's wife; Esha's mother; Ishaani's step-mother (2021–2023)
- Surabhi Talodia as Ishaani Ahlawat: Ram and Sushma's daughter; Ragini's step-daughter; Esha's half-sister (2022–2023)

==== Beniwals ====
- Asmita Sharma as Barfi Beniwal: Deep and Neelam's mother (2022)
- Ashutosh Semwal as Deep Beniwal: Rajvardhan's employee; Barfi's son; Neelam's elder brother; Meet Ahlawat's colleague and childhood friend; Esha's late husband (2021–2022)
- Tamanna Jaiswal as Esha Ahlawat Beniwal: Ram and Ragini's daughter; Ishaani's half-sister; Shantanu's ex-wife; Deep's widow (2021–2022)
- Gouri Agarwal as Neelam Beniwal: Barfi's daughter; Deep's sister (2022)

==== Sangwans ====
- Susheel Singh as Sarkar Sangwan: Yashoda's husband; Mahendra, Manmeet and Narendra's father; Veera, Veer, Aarohi and Sumeet's grandfather; Raj's step-grandfather; Manmeet's murderer (2023)
- Garima Srivastav as Yashoda Sangwan: Sarkar's widow; Mahendra, Manmeet and Narendra's mother; Veera, Veer, Aarohi and Sumeet's grandmother; Raj's step-grandmother (2023)
- Yogendra Singh as Mahendra Sangwan: Sarkar and Yashoda's eldest son; Manmeet and Narendra's brother; Gunwanti's husband; Veer and Veera's father (2023)
- Sheetal Dabholkar as Gunwanti Mishra Sangwan: Ramgopal's elder daughter; Nitin and Shagun's sister; Mahendra's wife; Veer and Veera's mother (2023)
- Hridayansh Shekhawat as Veer Sangwan: Gunwati and Mahendra's son; Veera's brother (2023)
- Mahi Soni as Veera Sangwan: Gunwanti and Mahendra's daughter; Veer's sister (2023)
- Mohit Sachdev as Narendra Sangwan: Sarkar and Yashoda's youngest son; Mahendra and Manmeet's brother; Imarti and Sapna's husband; Aarohi's father (2023)
- Pranjali Singh Parihar as Sapna Sangwan: Narendra's first wife; Aarohi's mother (2023)
- Priyanka Bora as Imarti Sangwan: Narendra's second wife (2023)
- Dolphin Dwivedi as Sundari Sangwan: Anuja and Meghna's mother (2023)
- Palak Rana as Meghna Sangwan: Sundari's daughter; Anuja's sister; Nitin's former love interest (2023)

==== Choudharys ====
- Sulabha Arya as Mrs. Chaudhary: Jeetesh, Ashok and Anand's mother; Abhay, Rajeev, Raunak, Pankhuri, Shlok and Priyanka's grandmother; Akki and Maira's great-grandmother (2023)
- Anil Dhawan as Jeetesh Chaudhary: Ashok and Anand's brother; Shagun's husband; Abhay and Raunak's father (2023)
- Sumit Singh / Amrapali Gupta as Shagun Mishra Chaudhary: Ramgopal's younger daughter; Gunwanti and Nitin's sister; Manmeet's ex-fiancée; Jeetesh's wife; Raunak's mother; Abhay's stepmother (2023) / (2023)
- Somesh Sharma as Abhay Chaudhary: Jeetesh's son; Shagun's step-son; Raunak's half-brother; Vani's husband (2023)
- Vikram Bham as Raunak Chaudhary: Jeetesh and Shagun's son; Abhay's half-brother (2023)
- Nidhi Bhavsar as Vani Chaudhary: Masoom and Hoshiyar's daughter; Duggu's sister; Abhay's wife (2023)
- Rajendra Chawla as Ashok Chaudhary: Jeetesh and Anand's brother; Pankhuri and Priyanka's father; Maira's grandfather (2023)
- Unknown as Mrs. Chaudhary: Ashok's estranged wife; Pankhuri and Priyanka's mother; Maira's grandmother (2023)
- Payal Gupta as Pankhuri Chaudhary: Ashok's elder daughter; Priyanka's sister; Sarthak's wife; Maira's mother (2023)
- Aman Mishra as Sarthak: Pankhuri's husband; Maira's father (2023)
- Unknown as Anand Chaudhary: Jeetesh and Ashok's brother; Poonam's husband; Rajeev and Shlok's father; Akki's grandfather (2023)
- Aditi Deshpande as Poonam Chaudhary: Anand's widow; Rajeev and Shlok's mother; Akki's grandmother (2023)
- Mayank Verma as Rajeev Chaudhary: Anand and Poonam's elder son; Shlok's brother; Anju's husband; Akki's father (2023)
- Arshi Srivastav as Anju Chaudhary: Rajeev's wife; Akki's mother (2023)
- Shaurya Sisodia as Akki Chaudhary: Rajeev and Anju's son (2023)

==== Others ====
- Pratham Kunwar as Kunal: Rajvardhan and Ram's nephew; Manushi's ex-husband (2021–2022)
- Manish Dalvi as Manikaka: Cook of the Ahlawat house (2021–2022)
- Shalini Mahal as Chhavi: Hoshiyar's sister (2021–2022)
- Manoj Kolhatkar as Inspector Hawa Singh (2022)
- Chandan Anand as Minister Abhay Rana: Babita's brother; Shantanu's father; Ashok's murderer (2022)
- Ankit Vyas as Shantanu "Shanty" Rana: Abhay's son; Esha's ex-husband (2022)
- Gazal Sood as Tanya: Meet Ahlawat's college friend (2022)
- Sheetal Antani as Popat: Meet Hooda's namesake aunt (2022)
- Manish Khanna as Jaypratap Singh: Sunaina's father; Ram Jr. and Lakhan's adoptive grandfather (2021–2022)
- Randeep Rai as Advocate Anurag Rathi: Meet Hooda's enemy turned friend (2022)
- Poonam Jangra as Mrs. Rathi: Anurag's mother (2022)
- Dinesh Mehta as Robber (2022–2023)
- Riya Subodh as Robber (2022–2023)
- Javed Pathan as Robber (2022–2023)
- Prachi Kadam as Anubha (2023)
- Aman Maheshwari as S.P. Neeraj Bhatia (2023)
- Krishnakant Singh Bundela as Baba (2023)
- Simran Tomar as Jalebi: Imarti's sister; Sarkar's ex-fiancée (2023)
- Tushar Kawale as Nitin Mishra: Ramgopal's son; Gunwanti and Shagun's brother; Meghna's former love interest (2023)
- Mrinalini Tyagi as Kanika: Minister's secretary (2023)
- Jinal Jain as Happy (2023)
- Srishti Singh as Bitti: Shlok's ex–fiancé (2023)
- Aarav Chowdhary as Pakistani General Bilawal Ali Hussain: Naaz's elder brother; Zainab's husband (2023)
- Swati Sharma as Naaz Hussain: Bilawal's younger sister (2023)
- Ahmed Khan as Mr. Hussain: Bilawal and Naaz's father (2023)
- Unknown as Zainab Bilawal Ali Hussain: Bilawal's wife (2023)
- Jasmine Avasia as Sakshi: Shlok's one sided obsessive lover (2023)

=== Guests ===
- Neha Marda
- Mugdha Chaphekar
- Megha Ray
- Amandeep Sidhu
- Sriti Jha
- Shabir Ahluwalia
- Mugdha Chaphekar
- Krishna Kaul
- Kanika Mann
- Nishant Singh Malkani
- Debina Bonnerjee
- Gurmeet Choudhary
- Reem Shaikh
- Rithvik Dhanjani
- Anjali Tatrari
- Avinesh Rekhi
- Megha Ray

== Production ==
=== Development ===
The marriage track in the show was a high-budget track, probably the most spent track in the series.

=== Release ===
In August 2021, Zee TV announced two new shows at their early slots namely Meet and Rishton Ka Manjha and both the shows were launched on the same date.

== Awards and nominations ==
Year	Award	Category	Recipient	Result	Ref
2022	Indian Television Academy Awards	Best Actor	Shagun Pandey	Nominated	
2022	Indian Television Academy Awards	Best Actress (Jury)	Ashi Singh	Won	
2022	Indian Television Academy Awards	Best Television Show - Fiction	Shashi Sumeet Productions	Nominated	
2023	Indian Telly Awards	Best Actress Jury	Ashi Singh	Won	

== Adaptations ==
Language	Title	Original release	Network(s)	Last aired	Notes
Odia	Sindura Bindu ସିନ୍ଦୁର ବିନ୍ଦୁ	7 March 2015	Zee Sarthak	15 February 2020	Original
Bengali	Bokul Kotha বকুল কথা	4 December 2017	Zee Bangla	1 February 2020	Remake
Tamil	Sathya சத்யா	4 March 2019	Zee Tamil	24 October 2021	Remake
Telugu	Suryakantham సూర్యకాంతం	22 July 2019	Zee Telugu	9 November 2024	Remake
Malayalam	Sathya Enna Penkutty സത്യാ എന്ന പെൺകുട്ടി	18 November 2019	Zee Keralam	17 April 2021	Remake
Kannada	Sathya ಸತ್ಯ	7 December 2020	Zee Kannada	10 August 2024	Remake
Hindi	Meet: Badlegi Duniya Ki Reet मीत: बदलेगी दुनिया की रीत	23 August 2021	Zee TV	14 November 2023	Remake
Marathi	Shiva शिवा	12 February 2024	Zee Marathi	8 August 2025	Remake
