= Tujhse Hai Raabta =

2018–2021 Indian drama television series

- Genre: Drama; Romance
- Created by: Sonali Jaffer
- Developed by: Sonali Jaffer; Amir Jaffer
- Written by: Dr. Zaheer Sheikh
- Screenplay by: Gitangshu Dey
- Story by: Kamolika Bhattacharya
- Directed by: Sanjay Satavase; Akhilesh Bhagat; Shashank Bhardwaj
- Creative director: Yakshi Burathoki
- Starring: Reem Shaikh; Sehban Azim; Shagun Pandey; Poorva Gokhale; Rajat Dahiya; Savita Prabhune
- Theme music composer: Prakash - Viraj
- Opening theme: "Kuch Toh Hai Tujhse Raabta"
- Country of origin: India
- Original language: Hindi
- No. of episodes: 729

Production
- Producers: Amir Jaffar; Sonali Jaffar
- Production location: Mumbai
- Cinematography: Manish Sharma; Hrishikesh Gandhi
- Editor: Swapnil Sudhakar Narurkar
- Camera setup: Multi-camera
- Running time: 22 minutes
- Production company: Full House Media Private Limited

Original release
- Network: Zee TV
- Release: 3 September 2018 – 31 July 2021

Related
- Inti Guttu; Kannathil Muthamittal

Tujhse Hai Raabta (transl. My Heart Knows) is an Indian Hindi-language television series that airs on Zee TV and is digitally available on ZEE5. It replaced Piyaa Albela. It premiered on 3 September 2018 and focuses on the unspoken connections and bonds between people. It stars Reem Shaikh, Sehban Azim, Poorva Gokhale, Arzaan Shaikh and Rajat Dahiya.

It was replaced by Bhagya Lakshmi in its timeslot.

== Plot ==
Kalyani Deshmukh lives in Pune with her parents. Her mother Madhuri slips on the balcony and dies, and her father Atul is jailed and gives her custody to his caring ex-wife, Anupriya who is dominated by her family. Kalyani's cousin, Sampada loves Atharv but was forced to marry ACP Malhar Rane. She delivers a son, named Moksh and elopes with Atharv. Malhar marries and troubles Kalyani, believing she was behind Sampada and Atharv's elopement.

Kalyani raises Moksh. Atharv and Sampada live poorly. He marries the landlady, Mugdha, proclaiming she is mentally unstable and takes over her property. Atharv and Sampada try to create problems for Kalyani but fail. Anupriya's brother, Keshav takes revenge on her by kidnapping Moksh, but Malhar finds him. After learning his mother Kavita died due to an accident by Atul's father Sayajirao, Malhar is angry. Sayajirao kills himself. Atul returns from jail.

Malhar and Kalyani reacquire Moksh's custody from Sampada. Atharv turns mentally unstable due to an accident. He befriends a man, in fact Malhar's father, Madhav. Kalyani introduces him to Malhar. A dead body is found. Madhav's brother, Sarthak reveals he killed the man. Malhar's sister, Swara tells the man was Radheshyam, a transgender man whom she fell in love with and married him. Kalyani realizes Sarthak isn't responsible for Radheshyam's death.

Soon, it turns out Malhar's half-brother, Aahir killed Radhe Shyam. He kidnaps Moksh but is jailed after Malhar and Kalyani save Moksh. Her friend Rachit enters. In a taxi, Malhar realises the driver is Aahir and saves Kalyani. Aahir escapes. Kalyani meets Madhuri's twin sister Mamta, who lost her right hand and works for the Naxals who disguises herself as Madhuri, Kalyani's mom. Rachit reveals he loves Kalyani after their fake marriage and blackmails her to agree with him if she wants to save Moksh who is diagnosed with cancer and needs an urgent bone marrow transplant.

Rachit tries to molest and later kill Kalyani, but Malhar saves her. Kalyani gets pregnant through IVF to save Moksh with Sampada and Malhar's child. Atharv, disguised, kidnaps Atul's mother Ahilya and tries to kill the child. Kalyani faints. Malhar learns her health is deteriorating, and abortion is necessary.

Trilok is a donor match for Moksh's bone marrow. Trilok has a wife, Divya, who looks exactly like Kalyani whose photo Kalyani sees on visiting his house. He says his wife is dead and he wants Kalyani to accompany his daughter, Suhana if they want him to donate bone marrow for Moksh. Kalyani and Malhar fight a lot and try to settle their different opinions. After the operation Trilok kidnaps Moksh and blackmails Kalyani.

Kalyani sends Divya in the car which according to Trilok has Moksh. The car explodes, and she dies. Kalyani and Malhar realise Moksh was also in it and assume him dead. Kalyani blames Malhar who shoots her in agitation unable to hear her say Moksh is dead. Kalyani is presumed dead as she falls off the cliff.

=== 5 years later ===
Malhar is now Sub-Inspector and lives in guilt for having lost Kalyani. Kalyani is now District Magistrate of the area. Swara is married to Vivek. Anupriya no longer considers Kalyani as her daughter. During her engagement to Minister Damini Deshpande's son, Vikram, Kalyani is caught in a fire, and Malhar saves her. Vikram rejects Kalyani after seeing her face. But Kalyani removes her bandages, thus revealing that she has only minor burns. But Kalyani refuses to marry Vikram due to his attitude.

On Avni's baby shower, it is revealed that Avni is not Malhar's wife. Ahir had left Avni when she became pregnant with his child. Madhav's dying wish was that Malhar would take care of Avni and her child in his name. Meanwhile, Kalyani finds out that Mukku is none other than Moksh. Moksh accidentally kills Ahir. Kalyani hides Moksh from Malhar, fearing that if Malhar finds Moksh, he will send him to the correction home. Meanwhile, Vivek accidentally burns Swara and is arrested.

To save Vivek from Sarthak's wrath, Anupriya tells him that Mukku is her and Sarthak's daughter. Avni tries to separate the family and turn them against each other fortunately Malhar discovers that Mukku is his son Moksh and is elated but Sarthak becomes depressed and the case of Ahir's death is opened and Malhar, Kalyani and Anupriya try to save Moksh but Malhar is shot by Avni and Anupriya is blamed and Moksh becomes mute as he is the witness to the incident of Malhar's death. Malhar returns and Moksh reveals that Anupriya is innocent and Avni had shot Malhar so Anupriya is proved innocent. Anupriya and Sarthak reunite with their lost daughter, Gungun and get remarried. Finally, Malhar, Kalyani, Moksh, Anupriya, Sarthak, AauSaheeb, Godavari, and kalyani’s unborn baby reunite to live happily.

== Cast ==
=== Main ===
- Reem Shaikh as Kalyani Deshmukh Rane: DM officer; Atul and Madhuri's daughter; Anupriya's adopted daughter; Sampada, Godavari and Nal's cousin; Malhar's wife; Moksh's adoptive mother (2018–2021)
- Sehban Azim as Malhar Rane: Sub-Inspector, ACP or Commissioner; Kavita and Madhav's son; Asawari's step-son; Swara's brother; Aahir's half-brother; Gungun's cousin; Sampada's ex-husband; Kalyani's husband; Moksh's father (2018–2021)
- Poorva Gokhale as Anupriya Bindal Rane: Advocate; Keshav's sister; Atul's ex-wife; Sarthak's wife; Gungun's mother; Kalyani's step mother; Moksh's adoptive grandmother (2018–2021)
- Rajat Dahiya as Sarthak Rane: Advocate; Madhav's brother; Anupriya's second husband; Gungun's father; Riddhi's adoptive father (2019–2021)
- Mahi Soni as Moksh Rane: Sampada and Malhar's son; Kalyani's adoptive son (2020–2021)
  - Arzaan Shaikh as Baby Moksh (2018–2020)
- Purvi Mishra as Gungun Rane: Anupriya and Sarthak's daughter; Malhar, Swara and Aahir's cousin (2021)

=== Recurring ===
- Savita Prabhune as Ahilya Deshmukh: Sayajirao's widow; Atul, Aparna and Vivek's mother; Sampada, Kalyani, Godavari and Nal's grandmother; Moksh's great-grandmother (2018–2021)
- Shagun Pandey / Varun Sharma as Atharv Bapat: Pallavi's brother; Swara, Sampada and Mugdha's ex-husband; Moksh's father (2018–2021)
- Sneha Shah as Sampada Verma: Aparna and Vaman's daughter; Kalyani, Godavari and Nal's cousin; Malhar and Atharv's ex-wife; Moksh's mother (2018–2021) (Dead)
- Shahab Khan as Sayajirao Deshmukh: Ahilya's husband; Atul, Aparna and Vivek's father; Sampada, Kalyani, Godavari and Nal's grandfather; Moksh's great-grandfather (2018–2019) (Dead)
- Priya Shinde as Pallavi Bapat Deshmukh: Atharv's sister; Vivek's first wife; Godavari and Nal's mother (2018–2020)
- Rajeshwari Datta as Aparna Deshmukh Verma: Ahilya and Sayajirao's daughter; Atul and Vivek's sister; Vaman's wife; Sampada's mother; Moksh's grandmother (2018–2021)
- Pankaj Vishnu as Atul Deshmukh: Ahilya and Sayajirao's elder son; Aparna and Vivek's brother; Anupriya's ex-husband; Madhuri's widower; Kalyani's father; Moksh's step-grandfather (2018–2019) (Dead)
- Amrapali Gupta as
  - Madhuri Verma Deshmukh: Vaman and Mamta's sister; Atul's second wife; Kalyani's mother; Moksh's step-grandmother (2018) (Dead)
  - Mamta Verma: Madhuri and Vaman's sister (2019–2020)
- Bharat Arora as Vaman Verma: Madhuri and Mamta's brother; Aparna's husband; Sampada's father; Moksh's grandfather (2019)
- Preetika Chauhan as C.P. Meenakshi Parmarth Borkar (2021)
- Anuj Khurana as Vivek Deshmukh: Ahilya and Sayajirao's younger son; Atul and Aparna's brother; Pallavi's husband; Swara's widower and murderer; Godavari and Nal's father (2018–2020)
- Anju Jadhav as Swara Rane Deshmukh: Kavita and Madhav's daughter; Asawari's step-daughter; Malhar's sister; Aahir's half-sister; Gungun's cousin; Atharv's ex-wife; Vivek's second wife (2019–2020) (Dead)
- Unknown / Ekta Methai as Godavari "Goda" Deshmukh Mehrotra: Pallavi and Vivek's daughter; Nal's sister; Sampada and Kalyani's cousin; Ajinkya's wife (2018–2020) / (2020–2021)
- Unknown as Nal Deshmukh: Pallavi and Vivek's son; Godavari's brother; Sampada and Kalyani's cousin (2018–2020) (Dead)
- Gaurav Puri as
  - Ajinkya Mehrotra: Transgender; Akshay's twin brother; Godavari's husband (2021)
  - Akshay Mehrotra: Ajinkya's twin brother (2021)
- Ayush Anand as Trilok Marathe: Divya's husband; Suhana's father; Moksh's donor and kidnapper (2020)
- Snehal Waghmare as Inspector Divya Marathe: Trilok's wife; Suhana's mother (2020)
- Ananya Dwivedi as Suhana Marathe: Divya and Trilok's daughter (2020)
- Shrashti Maheshwari as Avni Dixit: Aahir's ex-lover; Malhar's ex-fiancée (2020–2021)
- Utkarsh Gupta as Rachit Khanna: Kalyani's friend (2019–2020)
- Milind Pathak as Madhav Rane: Sarthak's brother; Kavita's widower; Asawari's husband; Malhar, Swara and Aahir's father; Moksh's grandfather (2019–2020) (Dead)
- Amita Choksi as Asawari Rane: Madhav's second wife; Aahir's mother; Malhar and Swara's step-mother; Moksh's step-grandmother (2019–2021)
- Asma Badar as Mugdha Bapat: Atharv's ex-wife (2019)
- Siddharth Dhanda as Aahir Rane: Asawari and Madhav's son; Malhar and Swara's half-brother; Gungun's cousin; Avni's ex-lover (2019–2020) (Dead)
- Vaishnavi Prajapati as Riddhi Dasgupta: Sarthak's adopted daughter (2019–2020)
- Roop Durgapal as Ketki Walia: Malhar's friend (2019)
- Pankit Thakker as Adinath Sayed (2019)
- Sheena Bajaj as Varsha Nehra: Atharv's fake girlfriend (2018)
- Amit Soni as Keshav Bindal: Anupriya's brother; Gungun's uncle (2019)
- Sanjeev Swaraj as Inspector Arvind Pawar (2018–2021)
- Zebby Singh as Inspector Abhimanyu Singh: Uttara's husband (2021)
- Vaidika Senjaliya as Uttara Singh: Abhimanyu's wife (2021)
- Twinkle Gangwar as Mihika Oberoi: Film actress (2021)
- Siddharth Sen as Vikram Deshpande: Damini's son; Kalyani's ex-fiancé (2020)
- Subeer Kasali as Damini Deshpande: Minister; Vikram's mother (2020)
- Suchita Trivedi as Savita Deshmukh (cameo) (2019)

== Production ==
The production and airing of the show was halted indefinitely in late March 2020 due to the COVID-19 outbreak in India. Because of the outbreak, the filming of television series and films was halted on 19 March 2020 and expected to resume on 1 April 2020 but could not and the series was last broadcast on 24 March 2020 when the remaining episodes were aired. The filming resumed on 28 June 2020 and with airing to resume on 13 July 2020.

== Reception ==
In April 2019, the series and the channel was sent notice by Election Commission for promoting the then Indian Prime Minister Narendra Modi's government scheme of Mudra Loan which violated the code of conduct for which the channel replied, "As a responsible national television network, ZEE has always created content basis its stringent content guidelines. The mention of certain government schemes and initiatives in some of the episodes of the television shows was a creative call taken purely in the interest of the public."

== Adaptations ==
Language	Title	Original release	Network(s)	Last aired	Notes
Hindi	Tujhse Hai Raabta तुझसे हैं राब्ता	3 September 2018	Zee TV	31 July 2021	Original
Telugu	Inti Guttu ఇంటి గుట్టు	30 November 2020	Zee Telugu	17 December 2022	Remake
Tamil	Kannathil Muthamittal கன்னத்தில் முத்தமிட்டால்	11 April 2022	Zee Tamil	20 May 2023	Remake
Malayalam	Valsalyam വാത്സല്യം	25 March 2024	Zee Keralam	20 May 2025	Remake
