= Anandha Ragam (TV series) =

Indian television series

- Genre: Drama
- Screenplay by: Kumarasamy Selvabharathi; Dialogue; S.Balamurugan
- Directed by: Sadhasivam Perumal; Salem Siva * Ponnai G.G.Madhan
- Starring: Anusha Hegde; Alagappan
- Opening theme: "Nenjukkule Nooru Aasai"; K.S. Chithra (Vocals); Pa.Vijay (Lyrics)
- Country of origin: India
- Original language: Tamil
- No. of seasons: 1
- No. of episodes: 1043

Production
- Producer: Udayasankar
- Production location: Tamil Nadu
- Cinematography: Nagakrishnan
- Editor: Sajin C
- Camera setup: Multi-Camera
- Running time: approx. 22–24 minutes per episode
- Production companies: Sun Entertainment; Aura Creations

Original release
- Network: Sun TV
- Release: 29 August 2022 – 14 January 2026

Anandha Ragam (transl. A Blissful Tune) is a 2022 Indian Tamil-language family drama series starring Anusha Hegde and Alagappan. It premiered on 29 August 2022 on Sun TV and ended on 14 January 2026, along with Ilakkiya. This serial digitally available on Sun NXT.

== Cast ==
=== Main ===
- Anusha Hegde as
  - ACP Eshwari "Esh" Azhagu Sundaram: Shanmugavel and Meenakshi's elder daughter; Abhirami's sister; Azhagu Sundaram's wife (2022–2026)
    - Samyuktha as Child Eshwari Shanmugavel (2022, 2023)
  - Thulasi Subramani: Eshwari's lookalike; Subramani and Savitri's elder daughter; Senthil's sister (2025–2026)
- Alagappan as Azhagu Sundaram "Azhagu" Ratnavel Pandiyan: Vasundara and Ratnavel Pandiyan's son; Shilpa's ex-fiancé; Eshwari's husband (2022–2026)
  - Neelesh as Child Azhagu Sundaram "Azhagu" Ratnavel Pandiyan (2022, 2023)

=== Recurring ===
- Preethi Sanjeev as Vasundara Ratnavel Pandiyan: Sampath's sister; Ratnavel Pandiyan's widow; Azhagu Sundaram's mother (2022–2026)
- Swetha Senthilkumar / Reshma Shajahan as Abhirami "Abhi" Kathirvel: Shanmugavel and Meenakshi's younger daughter; Eshwari's sister; Sanjeev's former love interest; Kathirvel's wife (2022–2025) / (2025–2026)
- Vigneshwaran as Kathirvel "Kathir" Shaktivel Pandiyan: Shaktivel Pandiyan and Durga's son; Varsha's ex-lover; Abhirami's husband (2024–2026)
- Sivaranjani Vijay / Sai Madhavi as Girija Sampath: Sampath's wife; Divya's mother; Eshwari's arch rival (2022–2024) / (2024–2026)
- Parthan Siva as Sampath: Vasundara's brother; Saranya's ex-lover; Girija's husband; Shilpa and Divya's father; Ratnavel Pandiyan's murderer (2022–2026)
- Vaishali Thaniga as Divya Sampath: Girija and Sampath's daughter; Shilpa's half-sister (2022–2025)
- Ranjan Kumar as Shaktivel Pandiyan aka Shakti: Ratnavel Pandiyan and Mangai's brother; Durga's husband; Kathirvel's father (2022–2026)
- Sangeetha V / Indira Priyadarshini as Durga Shakthivel Pandiyan: Shaktivel Pandiyan's wife; Kathirvel's mother (2022–2024) / (2024–2026)
- Rindhu Ravi as Mangai: Ratnavel Pandiyan and Shaktivel Pandiyan's sister; Ramya's mother (2022–2025; 2026)
- Megna Jayakrishnaraj as Ramya: Mangai's daughter (2022–2025; 2026)
- Aarthi Ram as Padmavathi: Vasundara and Sampath's cousin; Manoj's mother (2024)
- Guhan Shanmugam as Manoj: Padmavathi's son (2024)
- Barath Guru as Sanjeev Thyagarajan: Vyjayanthi and Thyagarajan's son; Eshwari and Abhirami's cousin; Abhirami's former love interest (2022–2025)
- Anjali Varadharajan as Vyjayanthi Thyagarajan: Thyagarajan's wife; Sanjeev's mother (2022–2025)
- T. Sivakumar as Thyagarajan: Meenakshi's brother; Vyjayanthi's husband; Sanjeev's father (2022–2025)
- Sebastian as Theekuchi: Azhagu Sundaram's best friend (2022–2026)
- Jack as Inspector Arul Selvam: Eshwari's colleague (2024–2025)
- Chitra Rebecca as Varsha: Narmada's sister; Kathirvel's ex-lover (2024–2025)
- Jenny Periyanayagam as Poomayil: Household help; Girija's accomplice (2025)
- Geetha Saraswathi as Savitri Subramani: Subramani's widow; Thulasi and Senthil's mother (2025–2026)
- Rithik as Senthil Subramani: Subramani and Savitri's son; Thulasi's brother (2025–2026)
- Karthi Jii as Maruthamuthu Nagaraj: Nagaraj and Kasturi's son; Thulasi's one-sided lover (2025–2026)
- Vishwa as Kumar: Eshwari's student; Azhagu Sundaram's friend (2022–2024)
- Rajkamal as Santhosh: IPS academy officer (2022–2024)
- Surendar Raaj as Inspector Muthuvel aka Velayudham (2024)
- Reehana as Saranya: Sampath's ex-lover; Shilpa's mother (2022-2023)
- Indhu Chowdary as Shilpa Sampath: Saranya and Sampath's daughter; Divya's half-sister; Azhagu Sundaram's ex-fiancée (2022-2023)

=== Special Appearances ===
- Ilavarasu as Inspector Shanmugavel aka Shanmugam: Meenakshi's husband; Eshwari and Abhirami's father (2022, 2023) (Dead)
- Vinodhini Vaidyanathan as Meenakshi Shanmugavel: Thyagarajan's sister; Shanmugavel's wife; Eshwari and Abhirami's mother (2022, 2023) (Dead)
- Bala Singh as Ratnavel Pandiyan: Mangai and Shaktivel Pandiyan's brother; Vasundara's husband; Azhagu Sundaram's father (Posthumous photographic appearance)
- Kausalya as Dr. Gayathri: Yazhini's mother; Vasundara's doctor (2026)
- Rahila Syed as Yazhini: Gayathri's daughter (2026)

== Production ==
=== Casting ===
Kannada television actress Anusha Prathap was cast in the female lead role as Eshwari, making her debut in Tamil television dramas. Tamil actor Alagappan was selected to play the male lead of Azhagu Sundaram, making his debut in a male lead role. In cameo roles, Tamil actor Ilavarasu and Vinodhini Vaidyanathan were cast as Eshwari's parents.

Actress Reehana was cast as Saranya, who is Sampath's ex-lover and Shilpa's mother. Indhu Chowdary was cast as Shilpa. In May 2024, Sivaranjani Vijay portraying Girija quit and her character was shown in comatose. She is replaced by Sai Madhavi in December. In the same month, actress Indira Priyadarshini replaced Sangeetha as Durga.

In January 2025, Swetha Senthilkumar portraying Abhi, quit after a period of 2.5 years since the show's inception in 2022. She was replaced by Reshma Shajahan in February.

== Reception ==
The series was described by the Times of India as "one of the most-watched daily soaps on Tamil television". It had 560 episodes as of July 2024 and was said to be one of the top serials airing on Sun TV.

== Awards ==
| Year | Award | Category | Recipient(s) | Result |
|---|---|---|---|---|
| 2023 | Sun Kudumbam Viruthugal | Sirandha Sagothari | Anusha Hegde | Won |
| 2023 | Sun Kudumbam Viruthugal | Athiradi Nayagi | Anusha Hegde | Won |
| 2023 | Sun Kudumbam Viruthugal | Janaranjaga Nayagan | Alagappan | Won |
| 2023 | Sun Kudumbam Viruthugal | Best Villi | Sivaranjani Vijay | Won |
| 2023 | Sun Kudumbam Viruthugal | Best Mother | Preethi Sanjeev | Won |
| 2023 | Sun Kudumbam Viruthugal | Favorite Comedian | Sebastian | Won |
| 2023 | Sun Kudumbam Viruthugal | Best Music | Raghu Nandhan | Won |
| 2023 | Sun Kudumbam Viruthugal | Best Cinematography | Prakash | Won |
| 2025 | Sun Kudumbam Viruthugal | Gunachitra Nayagan | Alagappan | Won |
| 2025 | Sun Kudumbam Viruthugal | Sirandha Sagothari | Anusha Hegde | Won |
| 2025 | Sun Kudumbam Viruthugal | Panmuga Natchathiram | Preethi Sanjeev | Won |
| 2025 | Sun Kudumbam Viruthugal | Gunachitra Kathapaathiram | Sebastian | Won |

== Adaptations ==
| Language | Title | Original release | Network(s) | Last aired | Notes | Ref. |
|---|---|---|---|---|---|---|
| Tamil | Anandha Ragam ஆனந்த ராகம் | 29 August 2022 | Sun TV | 14 January 2026 | Original | |
| Marathi | Premas Rang Yave प्रेमास रंग यावे | 20 February 2023 | Sun Marathi | 9 March 2025 | Remake | |
| Kannada | Ananda Raaga ಆನಂದ ರಾಗ | 13 March 2023 | Sun Udaya | 9 December 2023 | Remake | |
| Telugu | Ardhangi అర్ధాంగి | 27 March 2023 | Sun Gemini | 21 September 2024 | Remake | |
| Malayalam | Anandha Ragam ആനന്ദ രാഗം | 17 April 2023 | Sun Surya | 16 February 2025 | Remake | |
| Bengali | Roopsagore Moner Manush রূপসাগরে মনের মানুষ | 3 July 2023 | Sun Bangla | 31 March 2024 | Remake | |
