= Premas Rang Yave =

2023 Indian Marathi television series

- Genre: Drama
- Screenplay by: Ashutosh Parandkar
- Directed by: Chandrakant Gaikwad
- Starring: See below
- Composer: Shashank Powar
- Country of origin: India
- Original language: Marathi
- No. of episodes: 667

Production
- Executive producers: Vaibhav Rangrao Patil; Supriya Ruchik
- Producers: Amol Kolhe; Ghanshyam Rao; Vilas Sawant
- Production location: Kolhapur
- Editor: Manish Pawar
- Camera setup: Multi-camera
- Running time: 22 minutes
- Production company: Jagdamb Creations

Original release
- Network: Sun Marathi
- Release: 20 February 2023 – 9 March 2025

Related
- Anandha Ragam

Premas Rang Yave (transl. Love should be colored) is an Indian Marathi language drama series starred Amita Kulkarni and Rohit Shivalkar in lead roles. It premiered on Sun Marathi from 20 February 2023 to 9 March 2025. It is an official remake of Sun TV series Anandha Ragam. In January 2024, Amita Kulkarni was replaced by Amruta Phadke as Akshara.

== Synopsis ==
Akshara, a smart and beautiful girl, is adored by everyone around her but circumstances make her cross path with Sundar, who hails from a rich family.

== Cast ==
=== Main ===
- Amita Kulkarni / Amruta Phadke as IPS Akshara Mohite Suryavanshi (2023–2024) / (2024–2025)
  - Varada Deodhar as Child Akshara (2023; 2024)
- Rohit Shivalkar as Sundar Suryavanshi (2023–2025)
  - Arjun Wayangankar as Child Sundar (2023; 2024)

=== Recurring ===
- Samira Gujar as Vasundhara Kadam Suryavanshi (2023–2025)
- Gauri Kulkarni as Sharvari "Sharu" Mohite Suryavanshi (2023–2025)
- Bhagyesh Patil as Ashwin Suryavanshi (2024)
- Vidya Sant as Urvashi Kadam (2023–2025)
- Kiran Dange as Yashwant Kadam (2023–2025)
- Sanjeev Tandel as Prataprao Suryavanshi (2023–2024)
- Monika Dabade / Sayalee Sambhare / Mrunalini Jambhale as Durga Suryavanshi (2023) / (2023–2024) / (2024)
- Rupa Shirsat Mangale as Nirmala Suryavanshi (2023–2025)
- Ankita Naik as Yamini Kadam (2023–2024)
- Shubhangi Jadhav as Kamini Suryavanshi (2023–2024; 2025)
- Usha Nadkarni as Aau (2023)
- Sachin Mane as Barkya (2023–2025)
- Vijay Pawar as Inspector Shantanu Subhedar (2024) (Dead)
- Mann Santosh Patil as Shaurya Suryavanshi (2024–2025)
- Anushka Borhade as Menaka Subhedar (2024–2025)
- Jinal Veshi as Shilpa (2023)
- Komal Somare as Pushpa (2023)
- Lakshya Gosavi / Jayesh Bhor as Soham (2023)
- Aaradhya Patil as Kamli (2023)
- Leena Athavale Datar as Vimal Patil (2023–2024)
- Ravindra Kulkarni as Dinkar Patil (2023–2024)
- Om Jangam as Daulat Patil (2023–2024)
- Amit Kalyankar as IPS Santhosh (2023)
- Abhijeet Chavan as Inspector Gopal Mohite (2023) (Dead)
- Sarika Nilatkar as Suman Patil Mohite (2023) (Dead)
- Kedar Joshi as Subhandrao Suryavanshi (2023)

=== Guest appearance ===
- Adinath Kothare to promote Paani (2024)
