= Shiva (Marathi TV series) =

2024 Indian Marathi language TV series

- Genre: Drama
- Written by: Pralhad Kudtarkar
- Directed by: Swapnil Warke
- Starring: See below
- Country of origin: India
- Original language: Marathi
- No. of episodes: 497

Production
- Executive producer: Vaibhav Rangrao Patil
- Producer: Amol Kolhe
- Production locations: Mumbai, Maharashtra
- Camera setup: Multi-camera
- Running time: 22 minutes
- Production company: Jagdamb Creations

Original release
- Network: Zee Marathi
- Release: 12 February 2024 – 8 August 2025

Related
- Sindura Bindu

Shiva is an Indian Marathi language TV series which aired on Zee Marathi. It is an official remake of Zee Sarthak's TV series Sindura Bindu. It starred Purva Kaushik and Shalva Kinjawadekar in lead roles. It premiered on 12 February 2024 along with Paaru. It is produced by Amol Kolhe and directed by Swapnil Warke under the banner of Jagdamb Production.

== Plot ==
A bold and unapologetic Shiva, aspiring to be an IPS officer, marries wealthy Ashutosh. As challenges surface, their contrasting strengths become the source of resilience in their relationship.

== Cast ==
=== Main ===
- Purva Kaushik as Shivani Kailas Patil / Shivani Ashutosh Desai (Shiva)
- Shalva Kinjawadekar as Ashutosh Ramchandra Desai (Chakula)

=== Recurring ===
Desai family

- Sameer Patil / Ramesh Wani as Ramchandra Desai (Bhau)
- Meera Velankar / Sneha Raikar as Seeta Ramchandra Desai
- Sunil Tambat as Laxman Desai
- Aarti Shirodkar as Urmila Laxman Desai
- Vaishnavi Aambvane as Sampada Laxman Desai

Shirke family

- Manasi Mhatre as Kirti Ramchandra Desai / Kirti Suhas Shirke
- Angad Mhaskar as Suhas Shirke
- Anupama Takmoghe as Shanta Shirke
- Vaibhavi Chavan as Priya Shirke

Patil family

- Mrunalini Jawale as Vandana Kailas Patil
- Srushti Bahekar as Divya Kailas Patil / Divya Chandan Shrungarpure
- Savita Malpekar as Janabai Hanumant Patil / Saubai Gajanan Mhatre (Baai Aaji)
- Ganesh Yadav as Kailas Hanumant Patil

Pana Gang

- Arjun Waingankar as Silencer
- Gaurav Kalusthe as Dipper
- Vitthal Talwalkar as Upper
- Hasan Shaikh as Stepney
- Sushant Divekar as Battery

Others

- Tejas Mahajan as Chandan Shrungarpure
- Divesh Medge / Shivraj Nale as Rakesh (Rocky)
- Vipul Kale as Manjunath Manjrekar (Manja)
- Gitanjali Ganage as Renuka Kate (Anjali)
- Ramesh Chandane as Nana Phadtare
- Sharad Ponkshe as Dinkar Tandale
- Sanjay Mone as Anna
- Amruta Dhongade as Neha
- Gururaj Avadhani as Guruji
- Gauri Kulkarni as Archana
- Shashikant Kerkar as Rajesh
- Gaurav Malankar as Prashant
- Pradnya Athlekar as Sujata

=== Cameo Appearance ===
- Bharat Ganeshpure as Mr. Choughule
- Shivani Sonar as Tarini Belsare
- Meghana Erande as Rani
- Varsha Usgaonkar as Kaveri

== Awards ==
Zee Marathi Utsav Natyancha Awards 2024
Category	Recipient	Role	Ref.
Best Actress	Purva Kaushik	Shivani Desai	
ZEE5 Popular Character Male	Shalva Kinjawadekar	Ashutosh Desai	
ZEE5 Popular Series	Amol Kolhe	Producer	
Best Father-in-law	Sameer Patil	Ramchandra Desai	
Best Comedy Male	Tejas Mahajan	Chandan Shrungarpure	
Best Grandmother	Savita Malpekar	Baai Aaji	
Best Friends		Pana Gang	

== Reception ==
=== Mahasangam ===
Date	Series	Ref.
24-30 November 2024	Lakhat Ek Aamcha Dada	

=== Special episode (1 hour) ===
- 28 July 2024
- 18 August 2024
- 2 February 2025
- 13 April 2025

=== Airing history ===
No.	Airing Date	Days	Time (IST)	Ref.
1	12 February 2024 – 31 May 2025	Daily	9 pm	
2	2 – 29 June 2025	Daily	9-10 pm	
3	30 June – 8 August 2025	Daily	9.30 pm	

== Adaptations ==
Language	Title	Original release	Network(s)	Last aired	Notes
Odia	Sindura Bindu ସିନ୍ଦୁର ବିନ୍ଦୁ	7 March 2015	Zee Sarthak	15 February 2020	Original
Bengali	Bokul Kotha বকুল কথা	4 December 2017	Zee Bangla	1 February 2020	Remake
Tamil	Sathya சத்யா	4 March 2019	Zee Tamil	24 October 2021	Remake
Telugu	Suryakantham సూర్యకాంతం	22 July 2019	Zee Telugu	9 November 2024	Remake
Malayalam	Sathya Enna Penkutty സത്യാ എന്ന പെൺകുട്ടി	18 November 2019	Zee Keralam	17 April 2021	Remake
Kannada	Sathya ಸತ್ಯ	7 December 2020	Zee Kannada	10 August 2024	Remake
Hindi	Meet: Badlegi Duniya Ki Reet मीत: बदलेगी दुनिया की रीत	23 August 2021	Zee TV	14 November 2023	Remake
Marathi	Shiva शिवा	12 February 2024	Zee Marathi	8 August 2025	Remake
