= Sathya (Kannada TV series) =

2020 Indian Kannada language TV series

- Genre: Drama
- Directed by: Swapna Krishna
- Starring: See below
- Country of origin: India
- Original language: Kannada
- No. of episodes: 987

Production
- Production locations: Bengaluru, Karnataka
- Camera setup: Multi-camera
- Running time: 22 minutes

Original release
- Network: Zee Kannada
- Release: 7 December 2020 – 10 August 2024

Related
- Sindura Bindu

Sathya is an Indian Kannada language television series aired on Zee Kannada. It premiered from 7 December 2020 and ended on 10 August 2024. The show is an official remake of Zee Sarthak's TV series Sindura Bindu. It was an essence remake of Tamil TV series Sathya. It stars Gauthami Jadav and Sagar Biligowda in lead roles.

== Plot ==
Sathya, a rebellious girl, falls in love with Karthik, who is attracted to Sathya's sister, Divya. As fate would have it, Sathya and Karthik get married.

== Cast ==
=== Main ===
- Gauthami Jadav as Sathya
- Sagar Biligowda as Karthik

=== Recurring ===
- Malathi Sardeshpande as Seetha
- Girija Lokesh as Girija
- Srinivasa Murthy as Ramchandra
- Abhijeeth as Lakshman
- Priyanka as Divya
- Shashi as Bala
- Shalini Rao as Urmila
- Anushree Janardhan / Rashmi as Keerthana
- Rakshita as Ritu
- Ramesh Bhat
- Seerunde Raghu as Manja

== Adaptations ==
Language	Title	Original release	Network(s)	Last aired	Notes
Odia	Sindura Bindu ସିନ୍ଦୁର ବିନ୍ଦୁ	7 March 2015	Zee Sarthak	15 February 2020	Original
Bengali	Bokul Kotha বকুল কথা	4 December 2017	Zee Bangla	1 February 2020	Remake
Tamil	Sathya சத்யா	4 March 2019	Zee Tamil	24 October 2021	Remake
Telugu	Suryakantham సూర్యకాంతం	22 July 2019	Zee Telugu	9 November 2024	Remake
Malayalam	Sathya Enna Penkutty സത്യാ എന്ന പെൺകുട്ടി	18 November 2019	Zee Keralam	17 April 2021	Remake
Kannada	Sathya ಸತ್ಯ	7 December 2020	Zee Kannada	10 August 2024	Remake
Hindi	Meet: Badlegi Duniya Ki Reet मीत: बदलेगी दुनिया की रीत	23 August 2021	Zee TV	14 November 2023	Remake
Marathi	Shiva शिवा	12 February 2024	Zee Marathi	8 August 2025	Remake
