= Saru (2025 TV series) =

2025 Indian Hindi television series

- Genre: Romance; Drama
- Created by: Sumeet Hukamchand Mittal; Shashi Mittal
- Directed by: Atif Khan
- Starring: Mohak Matkar; Shagun Pandey
- Country of origin: India
- Original language: Hindi
- No. of episodes: 409

Production
- Producers: Sumeet Hukamchand Mittal; Shashi Mittal
- Editor: Rakesh Lal Das
- Camera setup: Multi-camera
- Running time: 22 minutes
- Production company: Shashi Sumeet Productions

Original release
- Network: Zee TV
- Release: 12 May 2025 – 28 June 2026

Saru is an Indian Hindi-language television drama series that premiered from 12 May 2025 to 28 June 2026 on Zee TV. It is produced by Shashi Sumeet Productions, and stars Mohak Matkar and Shagun Pandey.

== Cast ==
=== Main ===
- Mohak Matkar as An IAS Officer:—Saraswati "Saru" Birla (formerly Bajaj): Chandrakant and Saroja's daughter; Anika's half-sister; Ved's wife (2025–2026)
- Shagun Pandey as Minister Ved Birla: Ramesh and Tara younger son; Rohit and Rachna's brother; Saru's husband (2025–2026)

=== Recurring ===
- Anushka Merchande as Anika "Annie" Bajaj: Chandrakant and Urmila's daughter; Saru's half-sister; Ved's obsessive lover (2025–2026) (Dead)
- Vikas Rai as Charan, Anika's friend and collegemate (2025–2026)
- Kamalika Guha Thakurta as Kamini Devi: Urmila's mother; Anika's grandmother (2025–2026) (Dead)
- Pankit Thakker as Chandrakant "Chandru" Bajaj: Indravardan and Annapurna's son; Saroja and Urmila's husband; Saraswati and Anika's father (2025–2026) (Dead)
- Lagan Dhall as Jiya: Anika's friend and collegemate (2025–2026)
- Paras Randhawa as Rohit Birla: Tara and Ramesh's elder son; Payal's husband (2025–2026)
- Shalu Shreya as Payal Birla: Rohit's wife (2025–2026)
- Vibha Bhagat as Urmila Bajaj: Chandrakant's second wife; Anika's mother (2025–2026)
- Niilam Paanchal as Saroja Bajaj: Chandrakant's first wife; Saru's mother (2025–2026)
- Swati Chitnis as Annapurna Bajaj: Chandrakant's mother; Saru and Anika grandmother (2025–2026)
- Vinod Kapoor as Indravadan Bajaj: Annapurna's husband; Chandrakant's father; Saru and Anika's grandfather (2025–2026)
- Manu Malik as Ramesh Birla: Rohit, Rachana, and Ved's father (2025–2026)
- Sonica Handa as Tara Birla: Rohit, Rachana, and Ved's mother (2025–2026)
- Diksha Tiwari as Rachna Birla: Ramesh and Tara's daughter; Rohit and Ved's sister (2025–2026)
- Zeel Thakkar as Phulla: Saru's friend (2025–2026)
- Aryan Hasan as Harshvardhan Kapoor: Cafe manager (2025)
- Ananya Chawla as Chanda: Kamini's niece (2025–2026)
- Ayush Anand as Rajat Patil: Saru's coach and friend (2026)

== Production ==
=== Casting ===
Mohak Matkar was selected to portray Saru. Shagun Pandey was chosen to play Ved. Kamalika Guha Thakurta was cast as Kamini.

== Adaptations ==
Language	Title	Original release	Network(s)	Last aired	Notes
Telugu	Mutyala Muggu ముత్యాల ముగ్గు	7 March 2016	Zee Telugu	22 August 2019	Original
Tamil	Azhagiya Tamil Magal அழகிய தமிழ் மகள்	28 August 2017	Zee Tamil	14 June 2019	Remake
Kannada	Kamali ಕಮಲಿ	28 May 2018	Zee Kannada	7 October 2022	Remake
Malayalam	Kabani കബനി	11 March 2019	Zee Keralam	27 March 2020	Remake
Hindi	Saru सरू	12 May 2025	Zee TV	28 June 2026	Remake
