= Kadambini (TV series) =

Indian Bengali television period drama series

- Genre: Drama; Biographical film
- Created by: Zee Bangla
- Developed by: Shibashis Bandopadhyay
- Written by: Anjan Chakrabarty
- Screenplay by: Saswati Ghosh
- Story by: Saswati ghosh
- Directed by: Rajendra Prasad Das
- Creative director: Joy Chandra Chandra
- Starring: Ushashi Roy; Manoj Ojha
- Theme music composer: Upali Chattopadhyay
- Opening theme: "Samarohe eso he poromotor"
- Ending theme: "Kadambini ..... Kadambini"
- Composer: Upali Chattopadhyay
- Country of origin: India
- Original language: Bengali
- No. of episodes: 85

Production
- Executive producers: Krishanu Ganguly; Urvi Mukherjee
- Producer: Zee Bangla
- Production location: Kolkata
- Cinematography: Santu Dutta; Goutam Naskar
- Editors: Jishu Nath; Biplab Mandal; Shaibal Das
- Camera setup: Multi-camera
- Running time: 22 minutes
- Production company: Zee Bangla

Original release
- Network: Zee Bangla
- Release: 6 July – 3 October 2020

Kadambini is a daily Bengali soap opera, which was premiered on Zee Bangla and the digital platform ZEE5. The show starred Ushasi Ray and Manoj Ojha in lead roles. It was launched on 6 July 2020 and went off-air within three months, on 3 October 2020, owing to its inaccurate historical screenplay and low ratings.

== Plot ==
The story is set in the late 19th and early 20th centuries, when many people were trying to reform the society. Women were often subjected to violence during this time. The story shows the struggle of a lady, Kadambini Ganguly née Bose, who stood up against violence and became the first Indian female doctor to practice modern Western medicine professionally.

== Cast ==
=== Main ===
- Ushashi Roy as Kadambini Ganguly née Bose aka Bini.
- Manoj Ojha as Dwarkanath Ganguly aka Dwaraka

=== Recurring ===
- Debdut Ghosh as Brajokishore Bose: Kadambini's father.
- Lopamudra Sinha as Pramodbala Devi: Kadambini's mother
- Debopriya Basu as Saudamini Bose: Kadambini's sister.
- Kanyakumari Mukherjee ad Bhobsundari Devi - Dwaraka's first wife.
- Oindrila Saha as Bidhumukhi Devi: Dwaraka's daughter aka Bidhu.
- Ankit Mazumder as Satish Ganguly: Dwaraka's son aka Satish.
- Ananya Sengupta as Tarasundori Devi aka Tara: Dwaraka's sister.
- Nandini Chatterjee as Udaytara Devi: Dwaraka's mother.
- Sumanta Mukherjee as Krishnapran Gangopadhyay: Dwarka's father.
- Sahana Sen / Anindita Raychaudhury as Surobala: Manmotho's mother.
- Sayak Chakraborty as Manmotho.
- Soumi Chakrobarty as Sarala Roy(Das): Dwaraka's student
- Ashmee Ghosh as Abala Bose(Das): Dwaraka's student
- Poonam Basak as Bula:Kadambini"s Friend
- Sandip Chakraborty as Durga Mohan Das: Sarala and Abala's father
- Rupsha Chakraborty as Brahmamoyee Devi: Sarala and Abala's mother
- Chandraneev Mukherjee as Manmohan Ghosh
- Twarita Chatterjee as Swarnalata Ghose: Monmohon's wife.
- Sreemoyee Chattoraj as Swarnaprobha Bose: Dwaraka's student.
- Shirsha Guhathakurta as Protima.
- Subhrajit Dutta as Babu Prankrishna Dutta.
- Nilanjan Dutta as Sashadhar - Prankrishna's henchman.
- Prarona Bhattacharya as Sundari Bai - A Baiji
- Dhrubajyoti Sarkar as Niranjan Mitra: Kadambini's former fiancé
- Sanjuktaa Roy Chowdhury as Priyadarshini mitra: Niranjan's mother.
- Gautam Mukherjee as Bhavesh Mitra: Niranjan's father.
- Shobhana Bhunia as Kaveri Mitra: Niranjan's sister-in-law.
- Indrajit Mazumder as Dr. Rajendrachanda Chandra.
- Debshankar Haldar as Dr. Mahendralal Sarkar
- Anindya Sarkar as Keshab Chandra Sen
