= Priyanka Halder =

Indian actress and model (born 1991)

- Born: February 10, 1991 (age 35); West Bengal, India
- Occupations: Actress, performer
- Years active: 2010–present
- Known for: Crime Patrol, Utha Patak 4, India's Got Talent
- Notable work: Television roles and India's Got Latent appearance
- Children: 1

Priyanka Halder (born February 10, 1991) is an Indian actress and model known for her roles in television dramas such as Crime Patrol and Utha Patak 4. Halder gained widespread attention in 2024 due to her controversial appearance on India's Got Latent.

== Early life and career ==
Halder completed her education up to Class 12, after which she got married. She began her acting career by appearing in crime shows, adult-themed content such as web series, and entertainment programs, including Crime Patrol and DD National productions.

== 2024 controversy ==
In 2024, Priyanka participated in India's Got Latent, performing as a model in a live costume-cutting act. During the segment, she revealed that she is married, has a 15-year-old son, and lives separately from her husband, who works for the Indian Railways in Nagpur. Halder resides in Mumbai and reportedly did not inform her husband about her performances. Her act was met with mixed reactions. Judges like Samay Raina, Bharti Singh, and Haarsh Limbachiyaa criticized her performance, labelling it inappropriate. However, others supported her, praising her creative expression amidst online debates about her personal choices.
