= Uma Bardhan =

Indian artist

- Born: 1945 (age 80–81); Kolkata, West Bengal, India
- Occupation: Artist
- Website: https://www.umabardhan.com/

Uma Bardhan (born in 1945) is an Indian contemporary artist. Her paintings are usually themed on stories and positions which are under-represented in both mainstream and contemporary art culture. Her preferred medium is water color on silk, and she has also worked in other media, including oil on canvas. Her paintings are in several major collections in India & abroad. Her works has been hugely inspired by her formative years in Kolkata and her deep belief in spirituality. Originally from Kolkata she lives & works in Gurgaon, Haryana

== Early life and education ==
Uma Bardhan started her work in early 20s, completed her Bachelor of Arts, from University of Calcutta followed by Diploma in fine arts from Birla Academy of Art and Culture, West Bengal under the tutelage of eminent artists like Makhan Dutta Gupta in oil color and Maniklal Banerjee in water colour.

She was always inclined towards art from her childhood. She used to like poems of Rabindranath Tagore very much & used to draw sketches by reading & visualising his poems in her mind.

== Art career ==
The concern and contemplation on multiple aspects related to Mother Nature get expressed by works of Artist Uma Bardhan. She weaves her protagonists, Hindu God and Goddess, women, birds and other natural elements into visual thoughts, into strokes of spirituality as one breathe in the colors, flow with the textures and soak in the spirit of mother nature. Being spiritual at heart Hindu God & Goddess always remains as part of her theme.

Uma Bardhan did her first solo art show in 1987, followed by numerous solo shows across decade. Her solo show Cosmic dance of Shiva I 2014 was themed on various form of dancing Shiva who is beneath all the creations and destruction's in this world. Her interest in the subject & spirituality took her to countless Shiva temples across India.

In another exhibition at the Academy of Fine Arts, Bardhan portrays the predominance of artificial environment prevalent in present-day city life as a contrast to the pristine beauty of nature in rural life. This series is hugely inspired by her formative years in Kolkata and the time she spent travelling to the interior villages and tribal areas of Bengal—a motif which keeps recurring in her works.

== Water Color on Silk ==
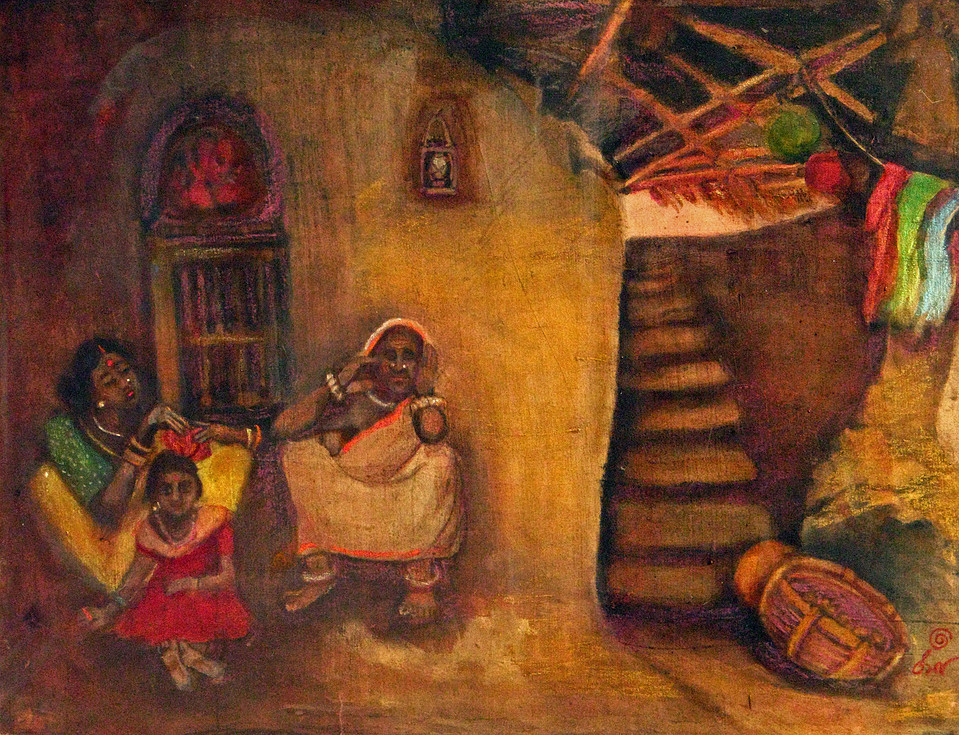
Watercolor on Silk (1998). Private collection.

She is one of a very few artist who uses a medium "Water Colour on Silk". A painstaking process where a special silk cloth is mounted on board before it can be used for painting. The reason it's not so popular might be due to the fact that it is a relatively painstaking process where a special silk cloth is mounted on board before being used as a painting. The silk cloth is arranged from Murshidabad district of West Bengal, famously known as murshidabad silk, and at first washed silk cloth by hand or in the washing machine on a gentle cycle with warm water. followed by mounting on paper board with adhesive. As water colors would tend to bleed/run more than the other paints it is required to keep the paints fairly thick without too much water added in. She applies adhesive over the mounted silk cloth to hold the water color otherwise it will spread & leave it for 2 to 3 hours for drying. The amount of adhesive to be applied over the silk cloth is tricky as one have to be very careful as two much adhesive might not be good.

== Exhibitions ==
Performed Solo & Group Shows at:

- Academy of Fine Arts, Kokata
- AIFACS, New Delhi
- Alliance Francaise, New Delhi
- Birla Academy, Kolkata
- Chitrakala Parishad, Bangalore
- Chemould Art Gallery, Kolkata
- DD Neroy Art Gallery, Mumbai
- Epicenter, Gurgaon
- Information Center, Kolkata
- ICCR, Kolkata
- Jehangir Art Gallery, Mumbai
- Lalit Kala Academy, New Delhi
- Open Palm Court IHC, New Delhi
- Sridharani Art Gallery, New Delhi
- State Gallery of Fine Arts, Hyderabad
- Visual Art Gallery IHC, New Delhi

== Exhibitions for Social Cause ==
- " On Women empowerment" in association with Central Social Welfare Board at Sridharani Art Gallery, New Delhi 2012
- " On Color discrimination" in association with Gallery Sree Arts at Alliance Francaise, Aug 2014.
