= List of Indian Bengali films of 2015 =

This is a list of Bengali language films released in India in 2015.

== January–March ==
Opening		Title	Director	Cast	Production company	Genre	Ref.
J A N U A R Y	2	Ebar Shabor	Arindam Sil	Saswata Chatterjee, Ahanaf, Abir Chatterjee, Payel Sarkar, June Malia, Ritwick Chakraborty, Debaleena Dutt, Rahul Banerjee	Reliance Entertainment	Action, thriller	
J A N U A R Y	2	Troyee	Raaj Mukherjee	Rituparna Sengupta, Badshah Moitra, Priyanshu Chatterjee		Drama	
J A N U A R Y	9	Lorai	Parambrata Chatterjee	Prasenjit Chatterjee, Payel Sarkar, Indrasish Roy		Drama	
J A N U A R Y	16	Open Tee Bioscope	Anindya Chatterjee, Shoojit Sircar	Riddhi Sen, Surangana Banerjee, Rwitobroto Mukherjee, Dhee Majumder, Rajarshi Nag, Rajatava Dutta, Sudipta Chakraborty, Kaushik Sen, Paran Bandopadhyay, Sohini Sarkar, Ambarish Bhattacharya, Aparajita Auddy, Biswanath Basu, Ritwick Chakraborty	Shoojit Sircar, Ronnie Lahiri	Coming of age	
J A N U A R Y	16	Romeo vs Juliet	Ashok Pati	Ankush Hazra, Mahiya Mahi	Eskay Movies	Romance, comedy	
J A N U A R Y	23	Chotoder Chobi	Kaushik Ganguly	Debalina Roy, Dulal Sarkar	Shree Venkatesh Films	Romance, drama	
J A N U A R Y	23	Herogiri	Rabi Kinagi	Dev, Mithun Chakraborty, Koel Mallick, Sayantika Banerjee	Surinder Films	Action, comedy, romance	
J A N U A R Y	30	Bodhon	Ayananshu Banerjee	Arpita Pal, Joy Sengupta, Gouri Ghosh, Mamata Shankar, Partho Ghosh, Prabir Das, Ahana Karmakar, Samriddha Pal, Dolly Basu, Sayani Ghosh, Debshankar Haldar, Soumitra Chatterjee, Koneenica Banerjee	Ayananshu Banerjee	Drama	
J A N U A R Y	30	Chhutti Aar Picnic	Shomshuklla Das	Shahana Chatterjee, Uditvanu Das, Sohini Mukherjee Roy			
F E B R U A R Y	7	Glamour	Mahua Chakraborty	Parambrata Chatterjee, Sabyasachi Chakraborty, Parno Mitra, Shantilal Mukherjee		Thriller	
F E B R U A R Y	20	Cocktail	Swapan Saha	Sib, Simmy, Rajatava Dutta, Abhishek chatterjee, Biswanath basu, Subhashish, Bodhiswatto, Aindol	Jyoti Film Production	Comedy, romance	
F E B R U A R Y	20	Hriday Haran	Arghya Mukherjee	Shikhar Srivastava, Ranjit Barui, Ena Saha, Laboni Sarkar			
F E B R U A R Y	20	Ichchhemotir Gappo	Adinath Das	Saswata Chatterjee, Tanushree Chakraborty, Aparajita Auddy		Drama	
F E B R U A R Y	20	Kader Kuler Bou	Soubhik Kundu	Koneenica Banerjee, Arindam Sil, Sankar Debnath		Action, crime, drama	
F E B R U A R Y	27	Bheetu	Utsav Mukherjee	Parno Mittra, Ritwick Chakraborty, Sudiptaa Chakraborty, Saheb Bhattacharjee, Kamaleswar Mukherjee	Aadidev Motion Pictures, Raw Stock Motion Pictures	Thriller	
F E B R U A R Y	27	Disha	Sanjoy Bardhon	Swarnali Poddar, Piu Mondal, Partha Pratim Roy, Syed Mudasar		Drama, mystery, romance	
M A R C H	6	Park Street	Partho Mukerjee	Firdaus, Dolon Roy, Sudip Mukherjee, Amitava Bhattacharjee			
M A R C H	20	Niyoti	Bablu Samaddar	Ranjit Mallick, Soumitra Chatterjee, Anup Kumar, Santu Mukhopadhyay			
M A R C H	20	Shajarur Kanta	Saibal Mitra	Dhritiman Chatterjee, Konkona Sen Sharma, Indraneil Sengupta	Macneill Media	Crime, mystery, thriller	
M A R C H	27	Ajana Batas	Anjan Das	Paoli Dam, Kaushik Sen, Shankar Chakraborty	Vignes Films	Drama	
M A R C H	27	1+1=3 Ora Tinjon	Ashok Biswanathan	Ashok Biswanathan, Debdoot Ghosh, June Malia			

== April–June ==
Opening		Title	Director	Cast	Production company	Genre	Ref.
A P R I L	10	Bitnoon	Abhijit Guha, Sudeshna Roy	Ritwick Chakraborty, Saayoni Ghosh, Gargi Roy Chowdhury	Jalan International	Comedy	
A P R I L	10	Amanush 2	Rajib Biswas	Soham Chakraborty, Anindya Chatterjee, Payel Sarkar	Shree Venkatesh Films	Crime, drama, thriller	
A P R I L	24	89	Manoj Michigan	Saswata Chatterjee, Raima Sen, Shataf Figar	Magic Motionz Moviez	Crime, mystery, thriller	
A P R I L	24	Jhumura	Anindya Chatterjee	Sohini Sarkar, Samadarshi Dutta, Pradipkumar Chakrabarty, Parthasarathi Chakraborty, Partho Sarathi Chakraborty	Ultimax Production	Drama, historic, musical	
M A Y	1	Bela Seshe	Nandita Roy & Shiboprosad Mukherjee	Soumitra Chatterjee, Swatilekha Sengupta, Rituparna Sengupta, Aparajita Auddy, Monami Ghosh, Shankar Chakrabarty, Indrani Dutta, Anindya Chatterjee, Sohini Sengupta, Kharaj Mukherjee, Sujoy Prasad Chatterjee, Sohag Sen, Barun Chanda	Nandita Roy & Shiboprosad Mukherjee	Drama	
M A Y	1	Bhalobasa Bhalobasa	Rabi Kinagi	Sabyasachi Chakrabarty, Hiran Chatterjee, Srabanti Malakar			
M A Y	1	Nirbaak	Srijit Mukherji	Anjan Dutt, Jishu Sengupta, Ritwick Chakraborty	Shree Venkatesh Films	Fantasy, musical, romance	
M A Y	8	Jogajog	Shekhar Das	Shuvolagna Mukherjee, Bratya Basu, Ananya Chatterjee		Drama	
M A Y	8	Kadambari	Suman Ghosh	Konkona Sen Sharma, Parambrata Chatterjee, Kaushik Sen		Drama, historic	
M A Y	15	Kamdev To Karmayogi	Subhash Ahuja	Meher, Manish Sharma, Subhash Ahuja			
M A Y	15	Room No. 103	Aniket Chattopadhyay	Ankita, Anjana Basu, Soumitra Chatterjee		Drama, thriller	
M A Y	15	Asche Bochor Abar Hobe	Sushanto Das	Arjun Chakraborty, Rittika Sen, Anindya Chatterjee			
M A Y	22	Jamai 420	Rabi Kinagi	Biswanath Basu, Mimi Chakraborty, Raj Chakraborty	Surinder Films, Shree Venkatesh Films	Comedy, romance	
M A Y	29	Family Album	Mainak Bhaumik	Swastika Mukherjee, Paoli Dam, Riya Sen		Drama	
J U N E	5	Shirshendur Diary	Sudipta De	Manish Chakraborty, Meghna Halder			
J U N E	5	She	Raja Banerjee	Tamal Roy, Rajesh Sharma, Kamalika Chanda			
J U N E	5	Bangal Ghati Fata Fati	Prabir Nandi	Jishu Sengupta, Koel Mallick, Manoj Mitra, Sabitri Chattopadhyay			
J U N E	5	Auto No. 9696	Aritra Mukherjee	Arjun Chakraborty, Amrita Chattopadhyay, Ankita Majumder			
J U N E	12	Bawal	Biswaroop Biswas	Arjun Chakraborty, Saayoni Ghosh, Ritabhari Chakraborty	KR Movies	Comedy	
J U N E	19	Guru Kripa	Prodyut Bhattacharya	Debraj Roy, Santana Basu, Mrinal Mukherjee, Srabanti Malakar, Rohan, Pamela, Amlan, Sabyasachi Dey Roy, Sayak Chakraborty			
J U N E	19	Naxal	Debaditya Bandyopadhyay	Mithun Chakraborty, Dhritiman Chatterjee, Shankar Chakraborty		Drama, historic	
J U N E	26	Asha Jaoar Majhe	Aditya Vikram Sengupta	Ritwick Chakraborty, Basabdatta Chatterjee		Drama	
J U N E	26	Boudi.com	Raaj Mukherjee	Saswata Chatterjee, Rachana Banerjee, Samrat Mukherjee, Mainak Banerje			
J U N E	26	Roga Howar Shohoj Upay	Debaloy Bhattacharya	Biswanath Basu, Raima Sen, Riya Sen, Parambrata Chatterjee, Rudranil Ghosh, Sujan Mukherjee	Shree Venkatesh Films	Comedy	
J U N E	26	Dakbaksho	Abhijit Choudhury, Prosenjit Choudhury	Satrajit Sarkar, Supriti Choudhury, Pradip Roy		Drama, mystery, romance, thriller	

== July–September ==
Opening		Title	Director	Cast	Production company	Genre	Ref.
J U L Y	3	Bhrashta Tara	Ashoke Viswanathan	Bhaswar Chatterjee, Rajesh Sharma, Biswajit Chakraborty, Nandini Ghosal, Sucheta Nath, Sophie Maulik, Sumit Ghoshal, Avik Ghosh, Pralhad Chatterjee			
J U L Y	3	Sesh Anka	Tathagata Banerjee	Mir Afsar Ali, Sanjeeb Banerjee, Tathagata Banerjee	Macneill Media	Mystery	
J U L Y	10	Eka Ebong Eka	Susanta Paul Chowdhury	Abhishek Chatterjee, Soumitra Chatterjee, Mahua Sen, Debopriya, Priyanka Ghosh, Ratri Goswami			
J U L Y	10	Manihara	Subhabrata Chatterjee	Chiranjeet Chakraborty, Sohini Sarkar, Argha Deep Chatterjee, Neel Mukherjee, Biplab Chatterjee, Manasi Sinha, Late Kunal Padhi, Debranjan Nag, Rii Sen	69	Horror	
J U L Y	17	Besh Korechi Prem Korechi	Raja Chanda	Jeet, Koel Mallick, Kharaj Mukherjee, Puneet Issar, Ashish Vidyarthi, Biswajit Chakraborty, Tulika Bose, Soumili Ghosh, Vivaan Ghosh, Subhashish Mukherjee, Supriyo Datta, Koena Mitra	Surinder Films, Shree Venkatesh Films	Comedy, romance	
J U L Y	17	Swade Alhade (direct to TV)	Arindam Sil	Sreelekha Mitra, Biswanath Basu and Priyanka		Drama	
J U L Y	31	Choukaath	Raja Dasgupta	Sreelekha Mitra, Tota Roy Chowdhury, Ardhendu Banerjee, Bidipta Chakraborty, Saayoni Ghosh	Kausik Mitra Films	Drama	
A U G U S T	7	Anubrata Bhalo Achho? And a Verse Called Life	Partha Sen	Ritwick Chakraborty, Swastika Mukherjee, Debolina Dutta	Frames	Drama	
A U G U S T	7	Khelaghor	Raaj Mukherjee	Pallavi Chatterjee, Krishna Kishore Mukherjee, Pamela, Nivedita, Sakuntala Barua, Sudip Mukherjee, Pulokita	Purple Motion	Drama	
A U G U S T	7	Shesher Kobita	Suman Mukhopadhyay	Rahul Bose, Konkona Sen Sharma, Swastika Mukherjee, Debdut Ghosh, Tulika Basu		Romance	
A U G U S T	14	Agnee 2	Iftakar Chowdhury	Om Goswami, Amit Hasan, Mahiya Mahi, Ashish Vidyarthi	Eskay Movies	Action	
A U G U S T	14	Ekti Asharey Golpo	Arindam Chakraborty	Abir Chatterjee, Payel Sarkar			
A U G U S T	14	Ek Nadir Galpo: Tale of a River	Samir Chanda	Mithun Chakraborty, Shweta Prasad, Jisshu Sengupta, Mayukh Mukherjee, Anjan Srivastav, Nirmal Kumar, Montu Moha Patra, Krishna Kishore Mukherjee	R.P Techvision	Drama	
A U G U S T	14	Ghente Ghaw Ektu Onnorokom	Neel Mukherjee	Arpita Chatterjee, Jisshu Sengupta			
A U G U S T	14	Nirbashito	Churni Ganguly	Churni Ganguly, Saswata Chatterjee, Raima Sen, Lars Bethk, Lia Boysen, Martin Wallstrom, Joakim Granberg	Kaushik Ganguly Productions	Biography, drama, news	
A U G U S T	28	Natoker Moto	Debesh Chatterjee	Bratya Basu, Saswata Chatterjee, Paoli Dam, Rajatabha Dutta, Rupa Ganguly, Saayoni Ghosh	Friend's Communication	Drama	
A U G U S T	28	Chitra	Abhigyan Mukherjee	Debargha Mukherjee, Neel Bhattacharya, Sushmita Bhattacharya	Mahavir Productions	Romance, thriller	
A U G U S T	28	Kalkijug	Debarati Gupta	Bratya Basu, Debshankar Halder, Locket Chatterjee, Rimjhim Mitra, Sourav Chakraborty, Paulami Basu	Macneill Engineering	Thriller	
S E P T E M B E R	4	Jomer Raja Dilo Bor	Abir Sengupta	Abir Chatterjee, Payel Sarkar, Rajatabha Dutta	Pramod Films and Anushree Abir Entertainment	Comedy, musical, romance	
S E P T E M B E R	4	Love In Facebook	Pratik Biswas	George Baker, Santana Basu, Narugopal Mandal, Pratik Biswas, Debraj Roy & others	Pratik Biswas	Drama	
S E P T E M B E R	11	Dwitiyo Ripu	Abhijit Choudhury	Bitan Biswas, Biswajit Chakraborty, Debashree Chakrobarty	Kolkata Movie Station	Drama	
S E P T E M B E R	11	Parbona Ami Chartey Tokey	Raj Chakraborty	Bonny Sengupta, Koushani Mukherjee, Kharaj Mukherjee, Tulika Bose, Swastika, Moushumi Saha	Shree Venkatesh Films	Romance	
S E P T E M B E R	11	Teenkahon	Bauddhayan Mukherji	Kharaj Mukherjee, Rituparna Sengupta, Ananya Sen, Ashish Vidyarthi, Barshan Seal, Bhadra Basu, Biswanath Basu, Dhritiman Chatterjee, Joy Sengupta, Kaushik Mukherjee, Madhuparna Kumar, Manasi Sinha, Monu Mukhopadhyay, Panchanan Banerjee, Parvathy Baul, Phalguni Chatterjee, Pratirup Ghosh, Ratan Sarkhel, Sabyasachi Chakraborty, Suman Mukhopadhyay, Sumanta Mukherjee	Little Lamb Films	Comedy, drama, mystery	
S E P T E M B E R	18	Aashiqui: True Love	Ashok Pati	Ankush Hazra, Arindam Dutta, Rajatabha Dutta	Eskay Movies	Action, romance	
S E P T E M B E R	18	Aro Ekbar	Ariziet Halder	Rituparna Sengupta, Indrani Haldar, Rupa Ganguly, Saheb Bhattacharya	Rag Anurag Creations	Drama	
S E P T E M B E R	18	Prime Time	Ipsita Seal	Indraneil Sengupta, Paoli Dam, Arijit Dutta, Dulal Lahiri, Joyjit Banerjee, Rana Mitra, Sohini Sanyal, Subhrojeet Dutta	Ram Cine Arts	Drama	
S E P T E M B E R	25	Mayer Biye	Abhijit Guha, Sudeshna Roy	Saayoni Ghosh, Sreelekha Mitra, Sabyasachi Chakraborty	Eskay Movies	Comedy, drama	

== October–December ==
Opening		Title	Director	Cast	Production company	Genre	Ref.
O C T O B E R	2	Babar Naam Gandhiji	Pavel	Parambrata Chatterjee, Kaushik Sen, Sayoni Ghosh, Surajit Mukherjee	Jalan International	Drama	
O C T O B E R	16	Byomkesh Bakshi	Anjan Dutt	Jisshu Sengupta, Saswata Chatterjee, Ushasie Chakraborty, Koushik Sen, Chandan Sen, Shantilal Mukherjee, Sagnik Chatterjee, Jayjit Banerjee, Prantik Banerjee, Debdut Ghosh, Ankitaa Chakraborty	R.P Techvision	Crime, mystery, thriller	
O C T O B E R	16	Cross Connection-2	Abhijit Guha, Sudeshna Roy	Rimjhim Mitra, Tonushree Chakraborty, Sujan Mukherjee, Sudeshna Roy, Shayan Munshi		Comedy, drama, romance	
O C T O B E R	16	Katmundu	Raj Chakraborty	Soham Chakraborty, Abir Chatterjee, Rudranil Ghosh, Siddharth Sikdar, Srabanti Chatterjee, Mimi Chakraborty, Saswata Chatterjee, Roja Paromita Dey, Malobika Banerjee, Ekavali Khanna, Sanjit Mahato		Drama	
O C T O B E R	16	Rajkahini	Srijit Mukherji	Rituparna Sengupta, Jisshu Sengupta, Saswata Chatterjee, Abir Chatterjee, Kaushik Sen, Sudipta Chakraborty, Joya Ahsan, Sayani Ghosh, Sohini Sarkar, Parno Mitra, Priyanka Sarkar, Ridhima Ghosh, Lily Chakravarty, Ena Saha, Ditipriya Roy, Rudraneel Ghosh, Rajatava Dutta, Biswajit Chakraborty, Kanchan Mallick, Nigel Akkara	Shree Venkatesh Films	Drama, historic	
O C T O B E R	16	Shudhu Tomari Jonyo	Birsa Dasgupta	Dev, Srabanti Chatterjee, Soham Chakraborty, Mimi Chakraborty	Shree Venkatesh Films	Drama, romance	
O C T O B E R	30	Abby Sen	Atanu Ghosh	Abir Chatterjee, Raima Sen, Paran Banerjee	Friends Communication	Comedy, drama, sci-fi	
N O V E M B E R	6	Ludo	Qaushiq Mukherjee, Nikon	Kamalika Banerjee, Joyraj Bhattacharya, Soumendra Bhattacharya	Indie/multiple	Fantasy, thriller	
N O V E M B E R	6	Not a Dirty Film	Ranadeep Sarker	Saheb Bhattacharya, Mumtaz Sorcar, Ena Saha, Rajatava Dutta, Kharaj Mukherjee	Indira Initiatives	Drama	
N O V E M B E R	13	Selfie	Sovan Tarafder	Soumitra chatterjee, Anindya Bannerjee, Sohini Sarkar, Dola chakrabarty, Mir Debapratim Dasgupta	T.S.K Films		
N O V E M B E R	20	AranyaDeb	Debasish Sen Sharma	Jishu Sengupta Mir Afsar Ali, Sreelekha Mitra (limited release)	Kausik Mitra Films	Fantasy	
N O V E M B E R	27	Black	Raja Chanda	Soham Chakraborty, Bidya Sinha Saha Mim	DAG Creative Media, Viacom 18 Motion Picture	Romance, action	
N O V E M B E R	27	Onyo Opalaa	Satarupa Sanyal	Rupa Ganguly, Ritabhari Chakraborty. Bhaswar Chatterjee, Nigel Akkara		Drama	
D E C E M B E R	4	Chitrahar @ Cinema Noy Ganema	Sankho Banerjeea	Shaheb Bhattacharjee, Mumtaz Sorcar, Madhobi Mukhopadhay, Shataf Figar, Ena Saha, Locket Chatterjee, Kharaj Mukherjee, Rajatava Dutta, Saibal Bhattacharyay, Sourav Chatterjee		Drama	
D E C E M B E R	4	Ghuri	Ringo Banerjee	Kharaj Mukherjee, Joy Sengupta		Drama	
D E C E M B E R	4	Monchuri	Premasish Dey	Koneenica Bandopadhya, Biswanath Bose, Daminee Bose	Eastern Entertainment	Comedy, romance	
D E C E M B E R	11	Amar Prithibi	Partha Sarathi Joarder	Soumitra Chatterjee, Bhaswar Chatterjee, Malobika Banerjee		Drama	
D E C E M B E R	11	Dugdhonokhor-The Milky Nails	Sourav Sarkar	Mahua Halder, Ena Saha, Anindya Banerjee		Drama	
D E C E M B E R	18	Har Har Byomkesh	Arindam Sil	Abir Chatterjee, Ritwick Chakraborty, Sohini Sarkar, Nusrat Jahan, Shadab Kamal, Adil Hussain, Harsh Chhaya, Rachel White, Deepankar De, June Malia	Shree Venkatesh Films, Surinder Films	Thriller, action	
D E C E M B E R	25	Arshinagar	Aparna Sen	Dev, Rittika Sen, Jisshu Sengupta, Roopa Ganguly, Waheeda Rehman, Kamaleshwar Mukherjee, Kaushik Sen, Shankar Chakraborty, Subhashish Mukherjee, Shantilal Mukherjee, Jaya Seal Ghosh, Paran Bandopadhyay, Aparajita Auddy, Anindya Banerjee, Anirban Bhattacharya, Parvathy Baul	Shree Venkatesh Films	Drama, musical, romance	
D E C E M B E R	25	Telephone	Subrata Dey	Soumitra Chatterjee, Kharaj Mukherjee, Sudip Mukherjee, Avinandan Dutta		Thriller	
