= Greentouch Entertainment =

Indian media and entertainment company

Greentouch Entertainment Pvt Ltd
- Company type: Media and Entertainment Company
- Founded: 2012
- Headquarters: Kolkata, West bengal, India
- Key people: Shyamsundar Dey; Arijit Dutta

Greentouch Entertainment Pvt. Ltd. is an Indian media and entertainment company based in Kolkata, West Bengal. Started in 2012, Greentouch Entertainment is one of the prominent Bengali movie production houses in West Bengal.

== Film Production ==
Greentouch Entertainment Pvt. Ltd. has produced and distributed Bengali feature films, such as Jodi Love Dilena Prane, Asche Bochor Abar Hobe, Hercules, Lorai, Katmundu, Bastushaap, Hemanta, Chocolate and Dekh Kemon Lage The upcoming releases are Honeymoon and Michael. Now the Company is renamed as Shadow Films

== Television ==
In addition to the film production activities, Greentouch Entertainment has also produced Bengali serials. The prime-time show "Hiyar Majhe", a joint production with Magic Moments Motion Pictures starring Monami Ghosh and Badshah Moitra was telecasted on ETV Bangla in 2013 .

The company has also been produced the story of Taranath Tantrik in 2016 telecasted on Colors Bangla.

== Filmography ==
Year	Film	Release date	Director(s)	Cast	Reference
2014	Jodi Love Dile Na Prane	28 February	Sudeshna Roy Abhijit Guha	Abir Chatterjee Ananya Chatterjee Arjun Chakraborty Tridha Choudhury Kaushik Ganguly	
2014	Asche Bochor Abar Hobe	22 May	Susanta Das	Rittika Sen Arjun Chakraborty Anindya Chatterjee Shankar Chakraborty	
2014	Hercules	29 August	Sudeshna Roy Abhijit Guha	Parambrata Chattopadhyay Paoli Dam Saswata Chatterjee	
2015	Lorai	9 January	Parambrata Chattopadhyay	Prosenjit Chatterjee Payel Sarkar Gargi Roychowdhury Indrasish Roy	
2015	Katmundu	16 October	Raj Chakraborty	Abir Chatterjee Soham Chakraborty Rudranil Ghosh Mimi Chakraborty Srabanti Chatterjee and Roja Paromita Dey	
2016	Bastushaap	15 January	Kaushik Ganguly	Parambrata Chattopadhyay Abir Chatterjee Raima Sen Churni Ganguly and Kaushik Ganguly	
2016	Hemanta	12 August	Anjan Dutt	Parambrata Chattopadhyay Jisshu Sengupta Payel Sarkar Souptic Chakraborty	
2016	Chocolate	7 October	Sujan Mukherjee	Parambrata Chattopadhyay Payel Sarkar Rudranil Ghosh Kanchan Mullick	
2017	Dekh Kemon Lage	21 July	Sudeshna Roy Abhijit Guha	Soham Chakraborty Subhashree Ganguly Sujan Mukherjee Kanchan Mullick	
2018					
2018	Shonar Pahar	6 July	Parambrata Chattopadhyay	Parambrata Chattopadhyay Jisshu Sengupta Tanuja	
2019	Thai Curry	1 March	Ankit Aditya	Soham Chakroborty Hiran Chatterjee Rudranil Ghosh Saswata Chatterjee	
2019	Satyanweshi Byomkesh	16 October	Sayantan Ghoshal	Parambrata Chattopadhyay Rudranil Ghosh	
2020	The Parcel	13 March	Indrasis Acharya	Rituparna Sengupta Saswata Chatterjee	
2020	Biye.Com	22 November	Abhijit Guha and Sudeshna Roy	Bonny Sengupta Koushani Mukherjee	
2020	Harano Prapti	13 September	Raja Chanda	Soham Chakraborty, Tanusree Chakraborty	
2020	Saheb er Cutlet	20 October	Anjan Dutta	Arjun, Ambarish, Anindita & others	
2020	Dadur Kirti	Television film	Pathikrit Basu	Om, Ayushi	
2021	Ajob Premer Golpo	27 July	Raja Chanda	Bonny, Srabanti	
2021	F.I.R No. 339/07/06	10 October	Raja Chanda	Ankush Hazra, Bonny Sengupta	
2022	Hirokgorer Hire	16 September		Bonny Sengupta, Soham Chakraborty	
2022	Boudi Canteen	30 September		Soham Chakraborty, Subhashree Ganguly	
2022	Savings Account	4 November	Raja Chanda	Ankush Hazra, Sayantika Banerjee	
2022	Amropali	11 November		Bonny Sengupta	
2022	Har Mana Har	25 November		Soham Chakraborty	
2022	Hatyapuri	23 December	Sandip Ray	Indraneil Sengupta	
2022	Uttaran	30 December	Indraadip Dasgupta	Ankush Hazra, Kaushik Ganguly	
2023	Joy Kali Kolkattawali	27 January	Abhijit Guha, Sudeshna Roy	Soham Chakraborty, Nusrat Jahan	
2023	Sohorer Ushnotomo Din E	30 June	Aritra Sen	Vikram Chatterjee, Solanki Roy	
2023	Biye Bibhrat	14 July	Raja Chanda	Abir Chatterjee, Parambrata Chatterjee	
2023	Byomkesh O Durgo Rahasya	11 August	Birsa Dasgupta	Dev, Rukmini Maitra	
