= Sex comedy =

Genre in comedy

Sex comedy (also known as sexual comedy and erotic comedy) is a genre in which comedy is motivated by sexual situations and love affairs. Although "sex comedy" is primarily a description of dramatic forms such as theatre and film, literary works such as those of Ovid and Giovanni Boccaccio may be considered sex comedies.

Sex comedy was popular in 17th century English Restoration theatre. From 1953 to 1965, Hollywood released a number of sex comedies, some featuring stars such as Doris Day, Jack Lemmon and Marilyn Monroe. The United Kingdom released a spate of sex comedies in the 1970s, notably the Carry On series. Hollywood released Animal House in 1978, which was followed by a long line of teen sex comedies in the early 1980s, e.g. Porky's, Bachelor Party and Risky Business. Other countries with a significant sex comedy film production include Argentina (comedia picaresca), Brazil (pornochanchada), Italy (commedia sexy all'italiana) and Mexico (sexicomedias).

== Antiquity ==
Although the ancient Greek theatre genre of the satyr play contained farcical sex, perhaps the best-known ancient comedy motivated by sexual gamesmanship is Aristophanes' Lysistrata (411 BC), in which the title character persuades her fellow women of Greece to protest the Peloponnesian War by withholding sex. The "boy-meets-girl" plot that is distinctive of Western sexual comedy can be traced to Menander (343–291 BC), who differs from Aristophanes in focusing on the courtship and marital dilemmas of the middle classes rather than social and political satire.

His successor Plautus, the Roman playwright whose comedies inspired the musical A Funny Thing Happened on the Way to the Forum, regularly based his plots on sexual situations. The popularity of Plautus's comedies was a major influence on the creation of situation sex comedy.

== Restoration sex comedy ==
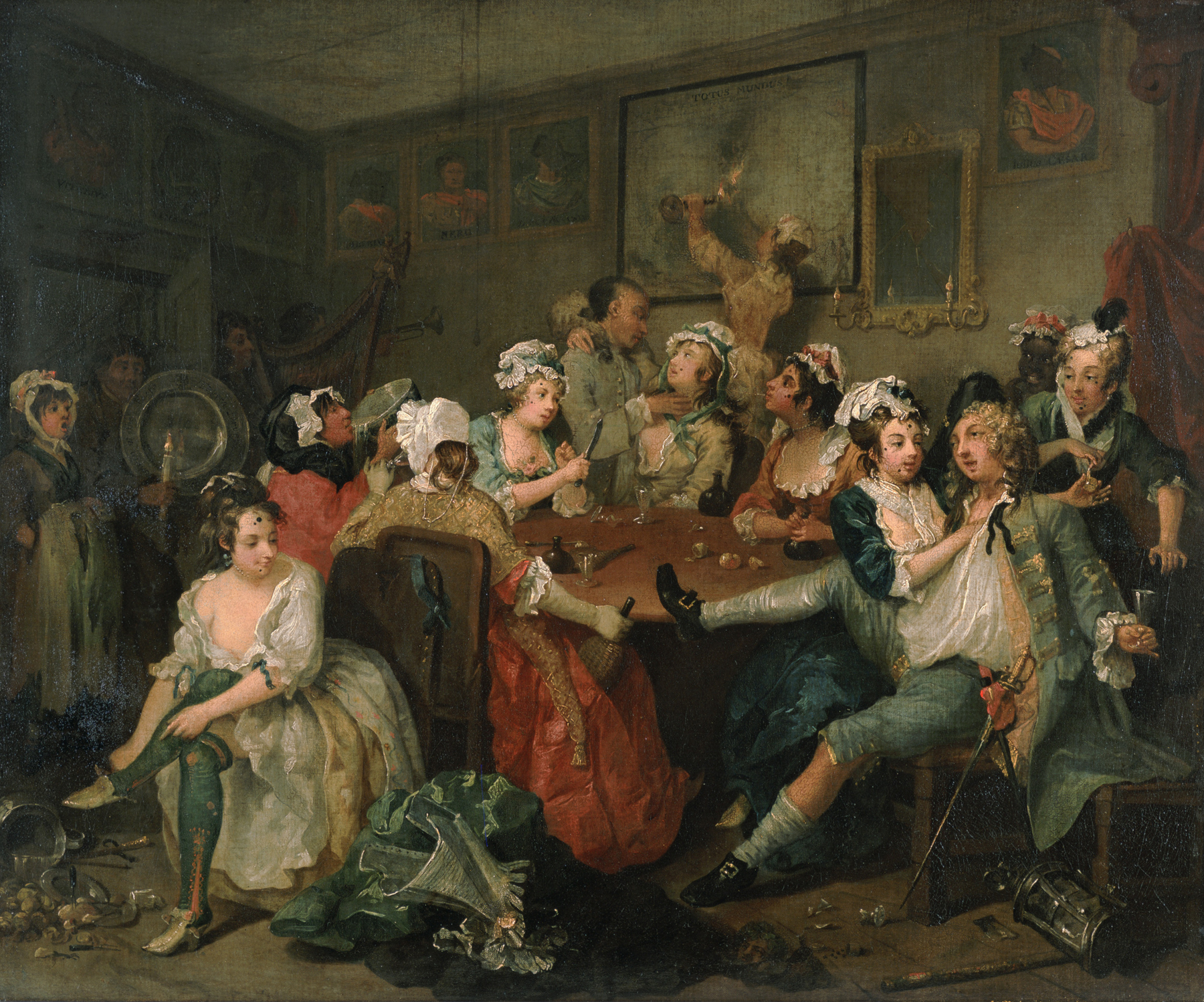
The sex comedies of the Restoration predated the theme of the rake in William Hogarth's painting series A Rake's Progress (third painting, 1732–1735).

During the period between 1672 and 1682, sex comedy such as The Country Wife (1675) flourished as part of the revival of theatre in England resulting from the Restoration. Forerunners of the craze were John Dryden's An Evening's Love (1668) and Thomas Betterton's The Amorous Widow (ca. 1670). Sexual content was favored by the presence of female performers, in contrast to the drag performances of the Elizabethan stage. The main character was often a self-important rake or libertine, posturing heroically. Adultery was a major theme, and the couple is sometimes found in flagrante delicto, represented by the stage direction "in disorder." The plays are often characterized by sexually charged banter, "swaggering masculine energy," and a superficially innocent heroine who is nonetheless alluring. This theatrical milieu produced the first woman of the Western tradition who made her living as playwright, Aphra Behn (The Rover).

Sex comedy embraces a realm of drama in which women can be contenders. The war is fought with glances and flirtations, wit and beauty, manipulation and desire. And in this battle, women often win—even if the victory is sometimes equivocal.

Presenting seduction and adultery as funny eased moral anxieties that might otherwise have attached to these themes. It is an open question as to whether the plays portraying libertinism endorses the lifestyle, or holds it up to satire and criticism.

After the main vogue of Restoration sex comedy, William Congreve revived and reinvented the form, and bawdy comedy remained popular into the 18th century.

== Modern sex comedy ==
=== American sex comedy ===
Film historian Tamar Jeffers McDonald highlights the period 1953 to 1965 as an era when sex comedy came to be the main form of romantic comedy in Hollywood. She claims that 1953 was a key year as the producers of the film The Moon Is Blue challenged the Motion Picture Production Code rules against using the word 'virgin', Hugh Hefner introduced Playboy magazine, and sexologist Alfred Kinsey drew attention to the way women were having sex before marriage. In the movies, playboys played by actors such as Rock Hudson or Tony Curtis would try to bed marriage-minded women played by actresses such as Doris Day or Marilyn Monroe, and the central question would seem to be "will she or won't she?", but in the end, the man would fall for the "girl", and sometimes agree to marry her. Notable sex comedies in this period were Some Like It Hot, The Apartment, Irma La Douce, Pillow Talk, The Seven Year Itch, Gentlemen Prefer Blondes and Lover Come Back. According to McDonald, by 1965, the sexual revolution was under way, so "will she or won't she?" could no longer serve as the central dynamic, and filmmakers moved on to different topics.

Some may also consider the 1967 film, The Graduate, to be a sex comedy due to the story being about the main character, Benjamin Braddock, being seduced and starting an affair with his family friends' mother, Mrs. Robinson. During the 70's, there were films such as Pretty Maids All in a Row, The Chicken Chronicles, The Swinging Cheerleaders, The Pom Pom Girls, and Cooley High which share some to many elements from the sex comedy sub-genre. The sub-genre sometimes shares genre elements with the coming-of-age stories genre as well.

In 1978, National Lampoon's Animal House's success led to a string of raunchy gross-out and sex comedies in the late 1970s and early to mid 1980s. Animal House featured many scenes that would become iconic and often parodied, such as the scene in which John "Bluto" Blutarsky (John Belushi) acts as a "peeping tom" to spy on a half-naked pillow fight at a sorority. In 1981, the film Porky's cemented the wide appeal of the sex comedy. Although it would go on to become the fifth highest-grossing film of the year, it proved to be unpopular with critics, with many accusing it of being degrading to women as well as objectifying of them. The film would lead to three sequels and is credited by many as the start of the "teen" subgenre of the sex comedy. Some other examples of these types of films from this era and some of which have actors/actresses starring in them that later went on to bigger fame include Revenge of the Nerds, Hot Dog…The Movie, The Last American Virgin, Losin' It, Risky Business, Mischief, Bachelor Party, Once Bitten, Fast Times at Ridgemont High, Secret Admirer, The Sure Thing, Class, Private Lessons, Private School, and Private Resort.

Another 80's teen comedy film that stars young actors and actresses that went into fame and is tamer on its handling of sex is Little Darlings.

Although not widely considered a "sex comedy," the 1998 critical and financial hit There's Something About Mary has many moments that have entered the pop culture lexicon, particularly the infamous scene in which Ted Stroehmann (Ben Stiller), following a scene of vigorous masturbation, discovers that his semen is hanging off of his ear. Mary (Cameron Diaz), mistaking it for hair gel, nonchalantly grabs it and runs it through her hair.

A year later, the film American Pie was credited with reviving the "teen sex comedy" subgenre. In the film, a group of high schoolers make a pact to lose their virginity before they graduate. The film's most famous scene (which also provides its namesake) involves one of the high schoolers, Jim (Jason Biggs), having intercourse with a fresh apple pie after being told by a friend that it is similar to "getting to third base." The film spawned numerous sequels and spin-off films, all with varying degrees of financial and critical success, and kicked off a second wave of American sex comedy in the late 1990s and early 2000s.

A third wave of American sex comedy emerged in the mid to late 2000s and into the early 2010s with a string of successful sex comedy films by Judd Apatow and his associates. Apatow's 2005 directorial debut The 40-Year-Old Virgin follows Andy Stitzer (Steve Carell) as he struggles with the pressures of reaching the age of 40 without ever having "done the deed." Although the film featured crude sexual humor, it was critically praised for balancing it with an underlying romantic message. Another Judd Apatow related film, Superbad, shared many similar motifs from classic "teen" sex comedies of the past.

Sex comedies of the 2010s include The To Do List, puberty-themed series Big Mouth, and Yes, God, Yes.

=== British sex comedy ===
According to David McGillivray in his history of the British sex film, Doing Rude Things, Mary Had a Little... (1961) was the first British sex comedy. Bridging the gap between documentary nudist films and the later sex comedies was the film The Naked World of Harrison Marks (1966). George Harrison Marks' love of music hall and slapstick found its way into this spoof documentary biographical film.

Norman Wisdom's last starring role, What's Good for the Goose (1969), was a sex comedy made by Tony Tenser. He specialised in producing exploitation films and founded his own production company Tigon British Film Productions in 1966. In the film, he leaves his wife and children to take a business trip and has an affair with a young woman, played by Sally Geeson. The film contains nude and bed scenes with Wisdom's and Geeson's characters appearing in bed together. A scene in which Geeson appears topless was cut from the UK release.

Percy was directed by Ralph Thomas and starred Hywel Bennett, Denholm Elliott, Elke Sommer, and Britt Ekland. The film is about a successful penis transplant. An innocent and shy young man (Bennett) whose penis is mutilated in an accident and has to be amputated wakes up after an operation to find out that it has been replaced by a womaniser's, which is very large. The rest of the film is about its new owner following in his predecessor's footsteps and meeting all the women who are able to recognise it. There was a sequel, Percy's Progress, released in 1974.

Seeking to adapt to the sexual revolution of the 1960s, the Carry On series added nudity to its saucy seaside postcard innuendo. Series producer Peter Rogers saw the George Segal movie Loving (1970) and made Carry On Loving (1970), the twentieth in the series. Starring Imogen Hassall, it tells the story of a dating agency service but is still very innocent. It was followed by Carry On Girls (1973), based around a Miss World-style beauty contest. Next in the series was Carry On Dick (1974), with more risqué humour based around Sid James and Barbara Windsor's on- and off-screen relationship.

It has often been noted that historically, a defining characteristic of most British sex comedies—particularly in the period after the censorship rules were relaxed slightly at the turn of the 1970s—is that they were "neither sexy nor funny".

==== The Confessions series ====
The Confessions series consisted of four sex comedies released during the 1970s starring Robin Askwith. The films in the Confessions series—Confessions of a Window Cleaner (1974), Confessions of a Pop Performer (1975), Confessions of a Driving Instructor (1976), and Confessions from a Holiday Camp (1977)—concern the erotic adventures of Timothy Lea and are based on the novels of Christopher Wood, writing as Timothy Lea.

The Adventures of... series of sex comedies, directed by Stanley Long, started with Adventures of a Taxi Driver, (1976) starring sitcom star Barry Evans, which was followed by Adventures of a Private Eye (1977) and Adventures of a Plumber's Mate (1978), starring future record producer Christopher Neil.

==== Carry Ons become sexy ====
British sex comedy films became mainstream with the release in 1976 of Carry On England, starring Judy Geeson, Patrick Mower, and Diane Langton, in which an experimental mixed-sex anti-aircraft battery in wartime enjoy making love not war.

Carry On Emmannuelle (1978), a spoof of the French erotic drama Emmanuelle (1974), was the last of the original Carry On films.

==== Sleaze and sexploitation ====
Producer/director Kenneth F. Rowles made the sex comedy, The Ups and Downs of a Handyman (1975). His next film, Take an Easy Ride, is a sexploitation film showing girls being sexually assaulted and murdered. It is shot in the style of a public information film warning of the dangers of hitchhiking, and Rowles says he was required to add the scenes of sexual violence by the film's distributor.

British sexploitation films such as Come Play With Me (1977) were screened in cinemas in Soho and elsewhere. However, British cinema at the time was partly funded by the Eady Levy and this was abolished in 1985, contributing to the end of the genre.

=== French sex comedy ===
Some French coming of age films contain many themes of the modern "sex comedy" genre, such as Murmur of the Heart.

=== Italian sex comedy ===
The commedia sexy all'italiana (lit. 'sex comedy Italian style'), also known as commedia scollacciata or commedia erotica all'italiana, is a subgenre of Italian commedia all'italiana film genre. It is characterized typically by both abundant female nudity and comedy, and by the minimal weight given to social criticism that was instead basic in the commedia all'italiana main genre.

=== Indian sex comedy ===
Since the 2010s, many Indian films and TV shows have been made in the sex comedy genre. There was initially a hesitant reaction to them but this was followed by gradual acceptance. Examples of the genre include Vicky Donor, Mastizaade, the Masti film series, The Shaukeens, the Pyaar Ka Punchnama film series, the Kyaa Kool Hai Hum film series, Guddu Ki Gun, in Bengali languages Teen Yaari Katha, Aamra, and the Four More Shots Please! in Hindi and, Ekla Cholo in Bengali streaming TV. Widely available and affordable Internet connections have been available in India since 2016, and this combined with affordable over-the-top media services have contributed to increased production of the genre. However, the conservative political and social culture that has been prevalent in the country since 2014 has been very critical of sex comedies. Sexual films and TV shows in general are subject to far more intense attacks on social media in India than are seen in other countries. Despite such criticisms the rate of sex comedy production has not slowed.

=== Japanese sex comedy ===
In Japanese, sexy movies or TV shows tend to be referred to as oiroke (お色気) which might be translated as 'with a tinge of colour.' 'Pink films' (ピンク映画) are more narrowly sexy films made by independent studios for release to adult theatres. The traditional word for comedy is kigeki (喜劇). It was applied to Kyōgen, short comic plays performed in theatres. The word kigeki is also used in the titles of some movies from the 1960s, but more recently the loan word komedi (コメディ) has become the usual way of referring to humorous films or TV shows.

In 1959 director Kon Ichikawa produced an adaptation of Junichirō Tanizaki's novel The Key titled Odd Obsession wherein a man whose powers are failing finds he can restore his vigor by spying on his daughter and her fiancé, so he hatches a scheme to involve his wife. Yasuzo Masumura's 1964 film adaptation of Junichirō Tanizaki's novel Quicksand (Manji) took a tongue-in-cheek approach to the melodrama of a housewife falling in love with a younger woman. Shohei Imamura released The Pornographers in 1966, parodying the workings of a small pornographic film company.

In 1970–71 Yuji Tanno and Isao Hayashi directed a number of movies based on Go Nagai's manga Harenchi Gakuen. Nagai's Kekkou Kamen manga has also been adapted into a movie and several Original Videos. Norifumi Suzuki has directed a number of sex comedies: Ero Shogun to Juuichinin no Aishou (The Erotic Shogun and his 11 Concubines, 1972), Onsen Mimizu Geisha (Hot Springs Worm Geisha, 1972), Onsen Suppon Geisha (Hot Springs Turtle Geisha, 1972) all for big-budget studio Toei, as well as the teen sex comedy Pantsu no Ana (Hole in her Panties, 1984).

Yoshimitsu Morita has directed a number of racy comedies including Something Like It (No You na Mono) (1981), Hot Stripper (Maru Hon Uwasa no Sutorippaa)(1982) and 24 Hour Playboy (Ai to Heisei no Iro Otoko) (1989). Director Juzo Itami's films such as The Funeral, Tampopo and A Taxing Woman are comedies principally about non-sexual topics, but all have a side story that deals with sex, and features nudity. Takeshi Kitano's Getting Any? movie is about the quest for sex. Nikkatsu's Roman Porno series was usually fairly serious, but Morita's Love Hard Love Deep and manga adaptation Minna Agechau were Roman Pornos, and other films in the series such as Pink Tush Girl and Abnormal Family: Older Brother's Bride have been described as comedies.

Recently there has been a spate of sexy coming of age comedies, e.g. Haruka Ayase's Oppai Volleyball and live action adaptations of the manga Tokyo Daigaku Monogatari, Ibitsu, Moteki and Recently, My Sister Is Unusual.

The 2003 Japanese TV drama Stand Up! starring Kazunari Ninomiya is the story of four virgin boys, and bears some resemblance to American sex comedies of the 1980s.

== See also ==
- Ribaldry
- Penis jokes
- Ecchi
- Category:Sex comedy television series
- Category:British sex comedy films
