= Gargi Roychowdhury =

Indian actress

Gargee Roychowdhury
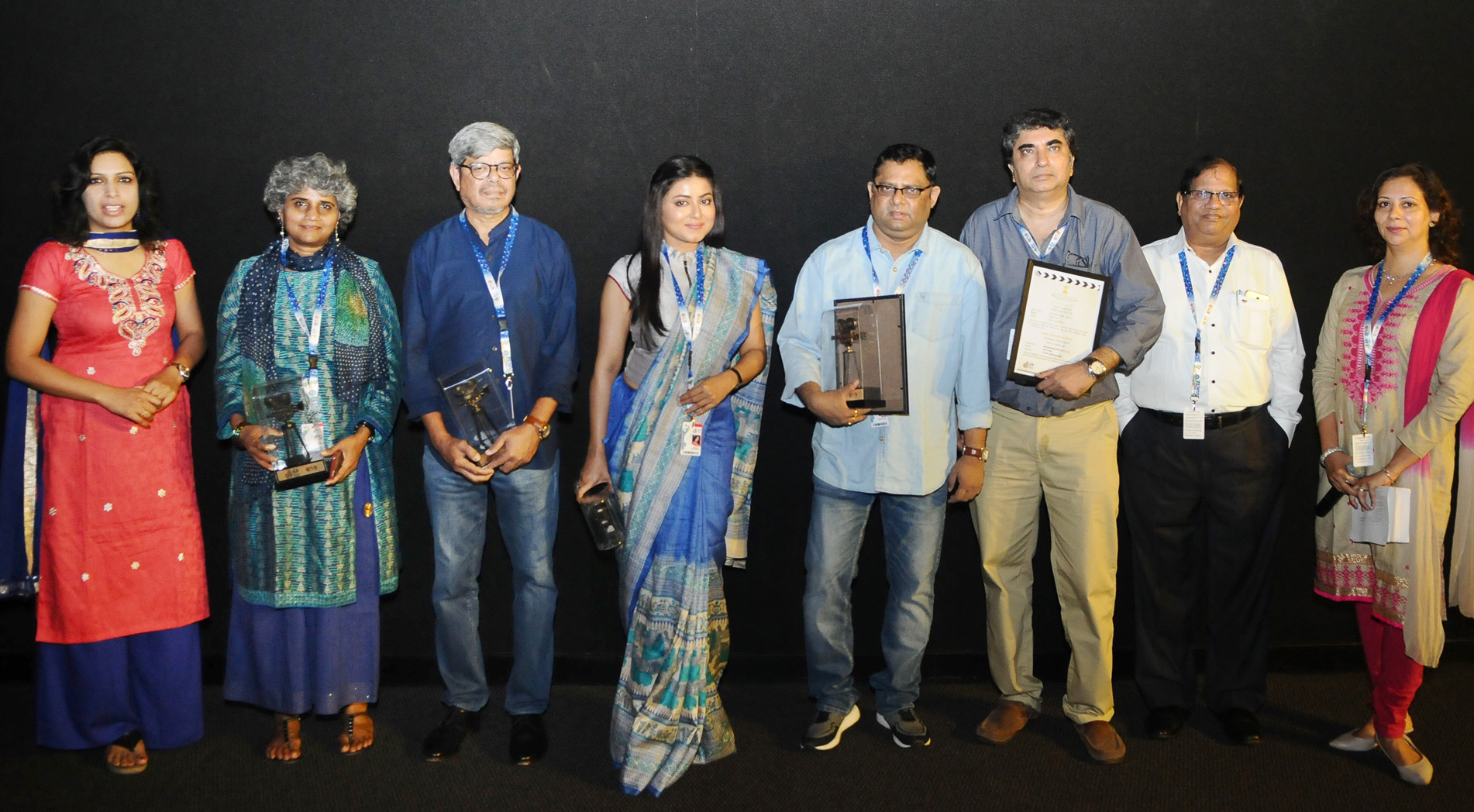
- Gargee Roychowdhury, IFFI (2017)
- Born: Kolkata, India
- Citizenship: Indian
- Education: Patha Bhavan, Kolkata
- Occupations: Acting, modelling
- Years active: 1995-present

Gargee Roychowdhury is an Indian actress. She is known for her works in the Bengali film industry and the Bengali television industry. Gargee Roychowdhury began her career as a theatre artist, performing in the theatre group Uttaran and later Bohurupee. She has also been a newscaster and radio artist.

== Career ==
Gargee Roychowdhury rose to fame for the Bengali long running soap opera Sisirer Sabdo Sona Jai, in which she played a lawyer.

Gargee Roychowdhury received acclaim for her performance in the movie Ramdhanu - The Rainbow. She played the role of Reena Sen in the film Naxal. In 2017 she starred in Anik Dutta's movie Meghnad Badh Rahasya. She also received popularity for her performance in the film Haami (2018).

== Filmography ==
Denotes films that have not yet been released

Year	Film	Director	Ref
2004	Shudhu Tumi	Sudeshna Roy and Abhijit Guha	
2010	Iti Mrinalini	Aparna Sen	
2012	Teen Yaari Katha	Sudeshna Roy and Abhijit Guha	
2014	Khaad	Kaushik Ganguly	
2014	Ramdhanu	Shiboprosad Mukherjee and Nandita Roy	
2014	Buno Haansh	Aniruddha Roy Chowdhury	
2015	Naxal	Debaditya Bandopadhyay	
2015	Bitnoon	Sudeshna Roy and Abhijit Guha	
2016	Hemanta	Anjan Dutta	
2016	Beche Thakar Gaan	Sudeshna Roy and Abhijit Guha	
2017	Chawlochitra Circus	Mainak Bhaumik	
2017	Meghnad Badh Rahasya	Anik Dutta	
2017	Mayurakshi	Atanu Ghosh	
2018	Haami	Shiboprosad Mukherjee and Nandita Roy	
2018	Uma	Srijit Mukherji	
2018	Kuasha Jokhon	Abhisekh and Meenakshi	
2019	Jyeshthoputro	Kaushik Ganguly	
2020	Sraboner Dhara	Sudeshna Roy and Abhijit Guha	
2022	Mahananda	Arindam Sil	
2022	Haami 2	Shiboprosad Mukherjee and Nandita Roy	
2023	Shesh Pata	Atanu Ghosh	
2025	Balaram Kando	Saptaswa Basu	

== Advertisement ==
Roychowdhury has been featured in the Bengali version of the 2013 Horlicks advertisement.

== Awards ==
- West Bengal Film Journalists' Association Awards - Best Actress for Mahananda (2023)
- Filmfare Awards Bangla - Best Actress (Critics) for Mahananda (2023)
