= Malobikar Katha =

- Directed by: Monojit Kar and Jhuma Paul
- Screenplay by: Subhranil Biswas
- Produced by: Equinox Film City
- Starring: See below
- Edited by: Santanu Mukherjee
- Music by: Kazi, Loy, Deep
- Release date: 2014
- Country: India
- Language: Bengali

Malobikar Katha is a 2014 Bengali film directed by Monojit Kar and Jhuma Paul.

== Plot ==
The story of the film revolves around a housewife of a rich family in Kolkata.

== Cast ==
- Rimjhim Mitra as Malobika
- Nigel Akkara as Aditya (husband of Malobika)
- Shanee Banerjee as Sunny
- Kamalika Banerjee as Kamalika
- Pratyusha Paul as Noa
