= Sraboner Dhara =

2020 Indian Bengali film

- Theatrical poster
- Directed by: Sudeshna Roy; Abhijit Guha
- Written by: Dr. Subhendu Sen
- Screenplay by: Padmanabha Dasgupta
- Based on: Between Raindrops
- Produced by: Pradip Churiwal
- Starring: Soumitra Chatterjee; Parambrata Chatterjee; Gargi Roychowdhury; Basabdatta Chatterjee; Rayati Bhattacharya
- Cinematography: Mondal
- Music by: Ashu Abhishek
- Production company: Macneil Engineering Ltd
- Release date: 7 February 2020
- Country: India
- Language: Bengali

Sraboner Dhara is an Indian Bengali drama film directed by Sudeshna Roy and Abhijit Guha. Starring Soumitra Chatterjee and Parambrata Chatterjee, the film deals with Alzheimer's disease, the issues faced by the younger generation, and the emotional attachment established with the medical caregivers of the older generation. It is based on Dr. Subhendu Sen's short story, Between Raindrops, and scripted by Padmanabha Dasgupta.

The film was selected to compete at the Kolkata International Film Festival under the Asian Select category. The film was released theatrically on 7 February 2020.

== Cast ==
- Soumitra Chatterjee as Amitava Sarkar
- Parambrata Chatterjee as Dr. Nilabho Roy
- Gargi Roychowdhury as Shuva Sarkar (Amitava Sarkar's wife)
- Basabdatta Chatterjee as Pritha Roy

== Promotion and release ==
The official trailer of the film was launched by Amara Muzik Bengal on 17 January 2020. The film released theatrically on 7 February 2020.
