= Bapi Bari Jaa =

2012 Indian Bengali-language film

- Film poster
- Directed by: Sudeshna Roy; Abhijit Guha
- Written by: Sudeshna Roy
- Produced by: Prosenjit Chatterjee; Mahendra Soni; Shrikant Mohta
- Starring: Arjun Chakrabarty; Mimi Chakraborty; Shalmi Barman; Anindya Chatterjee; Tista Dutta
- Cinematography: Saurabh Goswami
- Music by: Jeet Gannguli
- Production companies: Shree Venkatesh Films Pvt Ltd. Ideas Creation Pvt Ltd.
- Release date: 7 December 2012
- Country: India
- Language: Bengali

Bapi Bari Jaa is a 2012 Indian Bengali romantic comedy film directed by Sudeshna Roy and Abhijit Guha. The movie is jointly produced by Shree Venkatesh Films and Idea Creations. It stars Arjun Chakrabarty and Mimi Chakraborty in lead roles with Shalmi Barman, Tista Dutta and Anindya Chatterjee in other pivotal roles. The film is about youngsters and the story of the film revolves around a young sheltered man who suddenly discovers life when he goes to the streets one day. The movie was released on 7 December 2012.

== Plot ==
Five childhood friends – Bapi, Dola, Jijo, Hasna and Riju – are just out of college and hangs out together. Bapi, the younger son of a rich jeweller in Kolkata happens to be the money contributors for his friends. While Bapi joins his family business, other friends are looking out for jobs. Jijo gets into a relationship with Hasna. Riju thinks that he is into a relationship with a girl five years older than him. One day Riju's world was shattered when she introduced Riju to her fiancé, and calls him her brother. Riju got himself drunk, and all the friends left him alone outside the bar. While returning from the pub with Dola, Bapi realised that he must have got some feelings for Dola. One day, when Dola came to Bapi's house, he asked Dola "who is Bishwayan da?". They got into an argument and Bapi kissed Dola. Dola freed herself and told that they are just friends, but gave Bapi another kiss on his cheek. Further, she told that Bapi is not manly enough and lacks any mystery in his life. Another day Bapi's sister-in-law found adult magazines and evidence of masturbation, asks Bapi's elder brother to get Bapi married.

Bapi goes to see his prospective bride, where he meets Sheuli, a middle-class girl. Sheuli asks Bapi if he loves someone else. He confesses that he loves Dola. Sheuli told that she will help him to get Dola, but he must call off the marriage. Bapi introduces Sheuli to his friends. Dola seemed jealous about Sheuli and asked Bapi that this is not the ideal time to marry. Bapi gets a job of a salesman on the advice of Sheuli and struggles to impress Dola. In the meantime, Sheuli and Bapi seem to fall in love with each other. Dola realises that she loves Bapi and wants to be with him. One day Bapi went to Sheuli's home, where she asks him to stay away. It is seen that Sheuli meets her old boyfriend, who returned to the city. Dola confessed her love before Bapi, and told him not to leave his salesman job.

== Cast ==
- Arjun Chakrabarty as Bapi
- Mimi Chakraborty as Dola
- Shalmi Barman as Sheuli
- Anindya Chatterjee as Jijo
- Tista Dutta as Hasna
- Dhurbojyoti Sarkar as Riju
- Avrajit Chakraborty as Biltu
- Bulbuli Choubey Panja as Biltu's wife
- Oindrila Saha as Biltu's daughter
- Abir Chatterjee as Bishe Da
- Srijit Mukherji as Bishwayan Da

== Soundtrack ==
Bapi Bari Jaa

Soundtrack album by Jeet Gannguli
- Released: 7 December 2012
- Recorded: 2012
- Genre: Feature film soundtrack
- Language: Bengali
- Label: SVF
- Producer: Prosenjit Chatterjee

Jeet Gannguli chronology
Challenge 2 (2012)	Bapi Bari Jaa (2012)	Rocky (2013)

Singles from Bapi Bari Jaa
- 1. "Grow Up Bapi" Released: 28 Oct 2012; 2. "Chaap Nish Na" Released: 3 Nov 2012; 3. "Shahar" Released: 14 Nov 2012; 4. "Sajna" Released: 26 Nov 2012; 5. "Tomar Ghore" Released: 3 Dec 2012

All lyrics are written by Prasen (Prasenjit Mukherjee), Chandrani Gannguli, Anindya Chatterjee, Srijato; all music is composed by Jeet Gannguli.

No.	Title	Lyrics	Singer(s)	Length
1.	"Grow Up Bapi"	Prasen (Prasenjit Mukherjee)		3:42
2.	"Sajna"	Chandrani Gannguli	Ustad Rashid Khan & Arpita Chatterjee	3:29
3.	"Let Me Love You"		Usha Uthup
4.	"Chaap Nis Na"	Anindya Chatterjee	Shaan & Monali Thakur	3:01
5.	"Shahar"	Chandrani Gannguli	Bonnie Chakraborty	2:48
6.	"Tomar Ghore"	Srijato	Palash Sen	1:53
