= Rimjhim Mitra =

Bengali television and film actress (born 1986)

- Born: 1980 (age 45–46); Calcutta, West Bengal, India
- Occupations: Actress; Politician
- Years active: 2002–present
- Political party: Trinamool Congress (2023–present)
- Other political affiliations: Bharatiya Janata Party (2019–2023)

Rimjhim Mitra is an Indian actress and politician who works primarily in the Bengali cinema and television.

== Career ==
In 2010, she participated in a Bengali dance reality show. In 2013, she was the winner of season one of Jhalak Dikhla Jaa Bangla, shown on ETV Bangla. She played the role of Disha in Zee Bangla's Krishnakoli and Babli in Star Jalsha's Titli.

== Political career ==
Mitra joined the Bharatiya Janata Party in 2019. In October 2023, she quit BJP and joined the Trinamool Congress.

== Filmography ==
- Bonobhumi (2007)
- Cross Connection (2009)
- Mallick Bari (2009)
- Paglu 2 (2012)
- Keno Mon Take Chay (2012)
- Teen Yaari Katha (2012)
- Jug Jug Jio (2012)
- Final Mission (2013)
- Mahapurush O Kapurush (2013)
- Teen Patti (2014)
- Malobikar Katha (2014)
- Ei Bhabeo Phire Asha Jaye (2015)
- Ebar Shabor (2015)
- Kalkijug (2016)
- Jio Pagla (2017)
- Cholo Potol Tuli (2020)

== Television ==
- Ekdin Pratidin as Gunja (2005-2007) (Zee Bangla)
- Agnipariksha as Mohona (2009-2014) (Zee Bangla)
- Banhishikha as Diya Sarkar (Protagonist) (ETV Bangla)
- Mon Niye Kachakachi as Sritama / Shree (2015) (Star Jalsha)
- Checkmate as ACP Srija Sen (2015) (Star Jalsha)
- Khunje Beray Kacher Manush (Zee Bangla) as Gargee Sarkar
- Behula as Manasha (2010) (Star Jalsha) (Later replaced by Chandrayee Ghosh)
- Bhoomikanya as Ankush's sister-in-law (2018-2019) (Star Jalsha)
- Kotha Dilam (Akash Aath)
- Babu-Sona (Akash Aath)
- Joy Baba Lokenath as Baro Rani Maa (2018-2019) (Zee Bangla)
- Krishnakoli as Disha Chowdhury (2017-2021) (Zee Bangla)
- Titli as Sunaina Bose Mitra (2021) (Star Jalsha)
- Uron Tubri as Ratri (2022)
- Lokkhi Kakima Superstar as Sonia Roy Chowdhury (2022–2023) (Zee Bangla)
- Aalta Phoring as Amrapali Chowdhury aka Pali / Malini (2022) (Star Jalsha)
- Tomader Rani as Pinki (2023-2024)
- Video Bouma (2025) (Sun Bangla)
- Compass (2026) (Star Jalsha)

== Reality Shows ==
Year	Serial	Character	Channel
2013	Jhalak Dila Jaa	Winner	Colors Bangla
2015	Didi No. 1	(Season 6) Herself	Zee Bangla
2016	Dadagiri Unlimited	(Season 6) Herself	Zee Bangla
2016	Amar Bor Supestar	Host along with Kanchan Mullick	Star Jalsha
2016	Ebar Jalsha Rannaghore	(Season 2) Herself along with Bidya Sinha Mim and Priyanka Sarkar	Star Jalsha
2019	Dadagiri Unlimited	(Season 8) Herself along with Vivaan Ghosh	Zee Bangla
2019	Chakachak Comedy	Herself along with Debolina Dutta and Kanchan Mullick	Colors Bangla
2021	Dance Bangla Dance	(Season 11) Mentor of one team along with Soumili Biswas	Zee Bangla
2022	Dadagiri Unlimited	(Season 9) Herself	Zee Bangla

== Mahalaya ==
Year	Program Name	Character	Channel
2010	Nabadurga	Devi Siddhidhatri	Ruposhi Bangla
2016	Durga Durgatinashini	Joya Maa-Sanyasini Avatar of Maa Durga	Colors Bangla
2016	Abhayamangal	Dance Performance on Jatajuta Samayuktam and Rupang Dehi Jayang Dehi	Star Jalsha
2022	Devi Dasomahabidya	Devi Bhoirobi	Colors Bangla
