= Satyanweshi Byomkesh =

2019 Bengali language detective Byomkesh film

- First look poster
- Directed by: Sayantan Ghosal
- Written by: Anjan Dutt
- Screenplay by: Anjan Dutt
- Story by: Sharadindu Bandyopadhyay
- Based on: Magna Mainak by Sharadindu Bandyopadhyay
- Produced by: Greentouch Entertainment
- Starring: Parambrata Chatterjee; Rudranil Ghosh; Ayoshi Talukdar
- Cinematography: Ramyadip Saha
- Edited by: Subhajit Singha
- Music by: Neel Dutt
- Production companies: Greentouch Entertainment; RT Network Solutions Pvt. Ltd.
- Release date: 2 October 2019
- Running time: 103 minutes
- Country: India
- Language: Bengali

Satyanweshi Byomkesh is a 2019 Bengali detective thriller featuring the iconic sleuth Byomkesh, played by Parambrata Chatterjee. The role of Ajit is played by Rudranil Ghosh and Henna Mullick is played by Ayoshi Talukdar. The film is a murder mystery directed by Sayantan Ghosal, produced by Greentouch Entertainment and bankrolled by Shyam Sundar Dey and Tanmoy Banerjee, based on the story "Magna Mainak" by Saradindu Bandhopadhyay. The film was released in India on 2 October 2019. A sequel titled Durgo Rahasya was announced.

== Cast ==
- Parambrata Chatterjee as Byomkesh
- Rudranil Ghosh as Ajit Bandhyopadhyay
- Gargee Roy Chowdhury as Sukumari Chowdhury
- Anjan Dutt as Ravi Verma
- Suprobhat Das as Uday
- Ayoshi Talukdar as Henna Mallick

== Marketing and release ==
The first-look poster of the movie was released on 26 August 2019. The official teaser was launched by Greentouch Entertainment on 1 September 2019.

The film was theatrically released on 2 October 2019, coinciding with the Durga Puja holidays.
