= Amra 2GayTher =

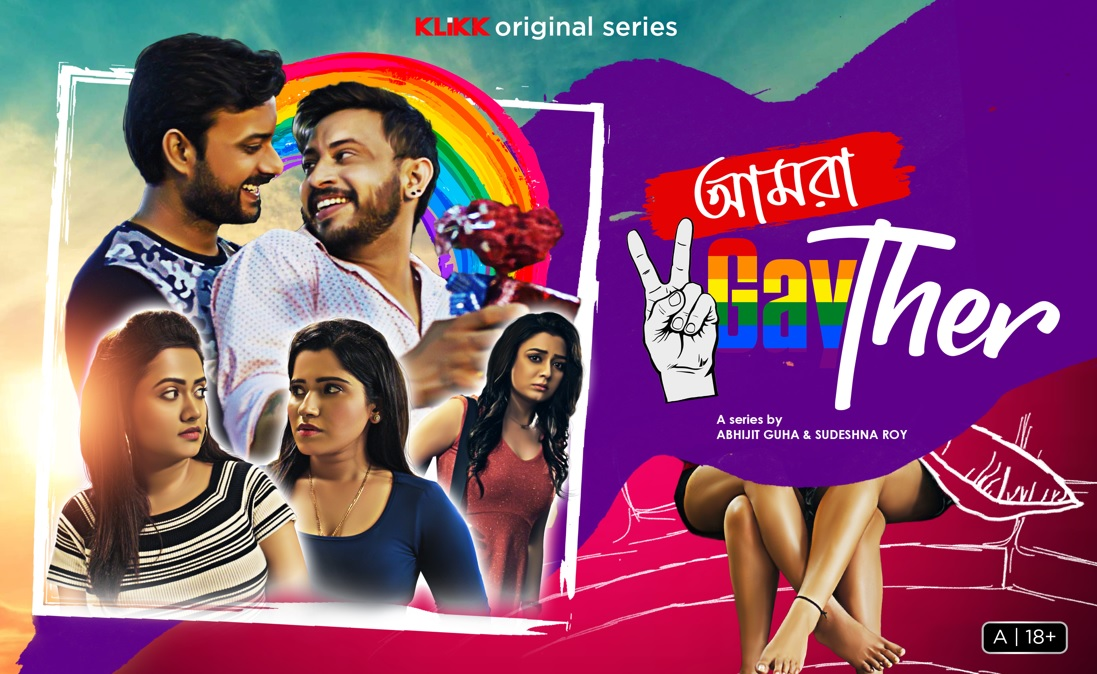
- Genre: Romance, Comedy
- Written by: Abhijit Guha and Sudeshna Roy
- Directed by: Abhijit Guha and Sudeshna Roy
- Starring: Indrasish Roy, Anindya Chatterjee, Sudipta Chakraborty, Pujarini Ghosh, Poulami Das, Sudip Mukherje, Pallavi Chatterjee, RJ Ayantika
- Music by: Rahul Tanmoy Subhro
- Country of origin: India
- Original language: Bengali
- No. of seasons: 1
- No. of episodes: 8

Production
- Producer: Dipanwita Samanta
- Editor: Santanu Mukherjee

Original release
- Release: 24 December 2021

Amra 2GayTher is a 2021 Bengali language romance and comedy web series written and directed by Abhijit Guha and Sudeshna Roy. The series was released on 24 December 2021.

== Plot ==
A boy in love wants to marry, but his father is furious and doesn't agree with his decision. This is a narrative that is fairly common. The boy's choice in Aamra2Gayther, though, is what distinguishes it. He wants to marry the well-known radio personality, who also happens to be a male and is his best friend. When he takes a choice like this, it drives his female coworker crazy and his father crazy, but his mother supports him, she leaves the house with him, and he now has to face the difficulties of starting again.

== Cast ==
- Indrasish Roy
- Anindya Chatterjee
- Sudipta Chakraborty
- Pujarini Ghosh
- Poulami Das
- Sudip Mukherje
- Pallavi Chatterjee
- RJ Ayantika

== Episodes ==
No.	Title	Directed by	Original release date
1	"Forbidden Love"	Abhijit Guha and Sudeshna Roy	24 December 2021
Riya tries every single way possible to profess her love to Vicky. Will Vicky reciprocate the same?
2	"Breaking the Closet"	Abhijit Guha and Sudeshna Roy	24 December 2021
Vicky builds up the courage to finally come out to his parents and says he wants to marry a guy.
3	"Section 377"	Abhijit Guha and Sudeshna Roy	24 December 2021
Riya indulges herself in work to get over Vicky and cooks up a plan to get him and Ron married. On the other hand, Vicky’s parents try to set him up to a girl.
4	"New Beginnings"	Abhijit Guha and Sudeshna Roy	24 December 2021
Vicky gifts Ron their new abode as they embark on their new journey. In the meantime, Vicky’s father creates a ruckus to stop the wedding.
5	"Rainbow Diaries"	Abhijit Guha and Sudeshna Roy	24 December 2021
Ron and Vicky are leading a happy married life with silly banters as every other couple. But Vicky hides a big decision from Ron. What will happen next?
6	"Baby Diaries"	Abhijit Guha and Sudeshna Roy	24 December 2021
Vicky faces all sorts of backlash and homophobia as he goes for IVF consultation. Ultimately, both Ron and Vicky decide to become biological fathers together.
7	"Blessing in Disguise"	Abhijit Guha and Sudeshna Roy	24 December 2021
While IVF procedures are sky-high, Vicky and Ron come across another lesbian couple who also want to become mother and are going through the same difficulties. So, both the couples mutually decide to help each other out.
8	"Happily Together"	Abhijit Guha and Sudeshna Roy	24 December 2021
The couples are blessed with healthy babies. Irrespective of the biological genders, sexual preferences, whoever and however a person identifies themselves, is valid.
