= Cross Connection =

2009 Indian Bengali film

- Poster
- Directed by: Abhijit Guha; Sudeshna Roy
- Written by: Satyaki Tarafdar
- Screenplay by: Padmanabha Dasgupta
- Produced by: Acropoliis Entertainment Pvt. Ltd.
- Starring: Ritwick Chakraborty; Rimjhim Mitra; Abir Chatterjee; Payel Sarkar; Saswata Chatterjee
- Cinematography: Soumik Haldar
- Edited by: Sujay Datta Ray
- Music by: Neel Dutt
- Distributed by: Piyali Films
- Release date: 1 May 2009
- Running time: 125 minutes
- Country: India
- Language: Bengali

Cross Connection is a 2009 Indian Bengali romance drama film directed by Sudeshna Roy and Abhijit Guha. The film was released theatrically on 1 May 2009.This film is the debut of Abir Chatterjee as lead hero in Bengali cinema.

A sequel, Cross Connection 2, by Abhijit Guha was released in 2015 with the same lead actors in the cast.

== Plot ==
The film revolves around four youths who try to discover their perfect love matches. Things repeatedly go wrong till they get resolved on Mandarmani beach near Kolkata. Imon, is a pretty, modern dancer and choreographer with a steady boyfriend Akaash who is a happy-go-lucky young man. Akaash is not confident about his English yet does not suffer a complex because his girlfriend is good at it. The problem is that they keep fighting all the time till it breaks up. The two are quick to find two other youngsters, Vicky and Piya to replace their former steady mates. But who is the right partner for the other? Is Vicky better than Akaash for Imon or would she rather stick to the troublesome Akaash? Is the ambitious, beautiful and petite Payal good enough for Akaash or would she rather go along with the USA-returned Vicky who is a short while away from flying off to Toronto? This is a love story with the modern generation X in mind. There is romance, there is cynicism, ambition and love. Above all there is comedy and a touch of sex without which no love story is complete. Cross connection deals with Imon's three loves, Aakash's three loves, Piya's switches and Vicky's intentions. This is a love story where egos clash to raise a laugh.

== Cast ==
- Ritwick Chakraborty as Aakash
- Abir Chatterjee as Vickey a.k.a. Vikram
- Rimjhim Mitra as Imon
- Payel Sarkar as Piya
- Biswajit Chakraborty as Imon's Father
- Saswata Chatterjee
- Kamalika
- Surojit Banerjee
- Sudeshna Roy
- Abhrajit Chakraborty
- Arijit-Rono
