= Naxal (film) =

2015 Indian Bengali film

- Film poster
- Directed by: Debaditya Bandyopadhyay
- Written by: Debaditya Bandhyopadhyay
- Screenplay by: Padmanabha Dasgupta; Pulok Das
- Story by: Debaditya Bandhyopadhyay
- Produced by: Mainakh Saha, Blue Coffee Moviez & Entertainment In association with The Kraft House
- Starring: Mithun Chakraborty; Dhritiman Chatterjee; Gargi Roychowdhury; Shankar Chakraborty
- Cinematography: Bijoy Anand
- Edited by: Md. Kalam
- Music by: Rupam Islam & Allan Ao
- Distributed by: The Kraft House
- Release date: 19 June 2015
- Running time: 1 Hour 49 Minutes
- Country: India
- Language: Bengali

Naxal is a 2015 Indian Bengali-language vigilante action thriller film directed by Debaditya Bandyopadhyay, starring Mithun Chakraborty and Dhritiman Chatterjee in pivotal roles.

The backdrop of the film is the Naxal Amol or Naxal Period. It was a period in the history of the state of West Bengal that began with the infiltration of the ideas of the socialist movements in the western world (especially Latin America) into the psyche of many Bengali youths. Mithun Chakraborty plays the lead role in this film as a Naxalite.

== Plot ==
1971: The story opens on the 21st May with the escaping of a few Naxalite youths. The most prominent among them is Anirban Sen. On that day, one of them named Samar dies while Anirban and their leader Sankar Da go absconding.

2013: After nearly 42 years, one fine morning a FAX arrives at the Kolkata Metro Railways Headquarters. It says that today Anirban will commit suicide under the last Metro. Questions regarding his identity and demands start emerging as the news has taken centre stage in the city. This news shake the entire city from Kolkata Police Headquarters (Lalbazar) to the news channels, while Anirban rattles the administration with one FAX after the other. On the other hand, Siddhartha Chowdhury, CEO of the number-one Bengali News Channel engages himself in using this incident to boost his channel's TRP. Shubhankar, a journalist with Siddhartha's channel, while searching for Anirban, discovers that one of those persons who went missing on 21 May 1971, Sankar Da is still alive and is living in Kolkata with a new name, who was none other than Siddhartha Chowdhury himself. Siddhartha, in the meanwhile, announces that he will telecast Anirban's Suicide LIVE on television, which in turn has plummeted the commercial value of his channel. On the other way, he realises that Anirban knows a lot about him after hearing the story from Anirban, comes to realise that Anirban is to be finished at any cost, and so he takes his revolver out from safety locker to finish him off, making to prove that he was a ruthless criminal, and not a real hero.

Then, how Anirban and Siddhartha settle their scores among themselves in Maidan metro station and Anirban avenge the death of his true friends after 42 years, killing Siddhartha and thus becoming a hero, forms the rest of the story.

== Cast ==
- Mithun Chakraborty as Anirban Sen
- Pathikrit Basu as teenage Anirban Sen
- Dhritiman Chatterjee as Siddhartha Chowdhury (Owner of a News Channel)/ Shankar Da (in 1971)
- Gargi Roychowdhury as Reena Sen
- Shankar Chakraborty as Minister Arijit Mitra
- Nishita Goswami
- Kapil Bora as Rohoni sen
- Kanchana Moitra
- Padmanabha Dasgupta
- Parthosarathi Deb
- Sagnik
