= Teen Yaari Katha =

2012 Indian Bengali comedy film

- Film poster
- Directed by: Sudeshna Roy; Abhijit Guha
- Written by: Anindya Bose; Sudeshna Roy; Abhijit Guha
- Produced by: Arpita Chattopadhyay
- Starring: Neel Mukherjee; Rudranil Ghosh; Parambrata Chatterjee; Gargi Roychowdhury; June Malia; Rimjhim Mitra
- Cinematography: Debnath Gangopadhyay
- Edited by: Sujay Dattaray
- Music by: Bhoomi
- Production company: Sahara One
- Release date: 4 May 2012
- Country: India
- Language: Bengali

Teen Yaari Katha (transl. Tale of Three Friends) is a 2012 Bengali language comedy film by the director team of Sudeshna Roy and Abhijit Guha. The Bengali musical group Bhoomi composed the film's music. The film tells the story of three middle class friends and their personal struggles. The film's release was delayed by censors due to its sexual themes. It premiered at the 2006 Osian Film Festival and was screened at the World Film Festival of Bangkok and the Kolkata Film Festival.

== Synopsis ==
Billu sells newspapers, Shyamal drives an autorickshaw, and Antu is unemployed. The friends share a room in Billu's uncle's house in the Kolkata suburbs. Each friend becomes involved with different girls; Antu secretly likes fellow acting student Dola, Shyamal has fallen for his boss cum landlord's daughter Mamoni, and Biloo's crush is Paoli Dam (unnamed in the film) but three of them, mostly Biloo is obsessed with Sreeradha who lives next door.

== Cast ==
- Rudranil Ghosh as Shyamal
- Neel Mukherjee as Biloo
- Parambrata Chatterjee as Antu
- Gargi Roychowdhury as Dola di
- Biplab Chatterjee as Biloo's Uncle
- Gita Dey as Biloo's grandmother
- Rimjhim Mitra as Mamoni
- Saswata Chatterjee as Ajoy
- June Malia as Sreeradha
- Paoli Dam as Biloo's love interest
- Rajesh Sharma as Sentu da
