= Dekh Kemon Lage =

2017 Indian Bengali film by Sudeshna Roy and Abhijit Guha

- Dekh Kemon Lage Movie Poster
- Directed by: Abhijeet Guha; Sudeshna Roy
- Screenplay by: Padmanabha Dasgupta
- Story by: Abhijit Guha and Sudeshna Roy
- Produced by: Shyam Sunder Dey
- Starring: Soham Chakraborty; Subhashree Ganguly; Avik Chongdar
- Cinematography: Premendu Bikash Chaki
- Edited by: Sujay Dutta Roy
- Music by: Jeet Gannguli
- Production companies: GreenTouch Entertainment; Nideas Creations & Production
- Distributed by: GreenTouch Entertainment
- Release date: 21 July 2017
- Country: India
- Language: Bengali

Dekh Kemon Lage is a Bengali language romantic comedy film directed by Abhijit Guha and Sudeshna Roy. Produced by Greentouch Entertainment and Nideas Creationa and conceptualised by Prosenjit Chatterjee, the film features Soham Chakraborty and Subhashree Ganguly in lead roles. In addition, Avik Chongdar, Mir Afsar Ali, Sujan Neel Mukherjee, Roopsha Dasguupta Ray, Rupsha Chakraborty, Kharaj Mukherjee, Biswanath Basu, Laboni Sarkar, Kanchan Mullick and Payel Mukherjee appear in supporting roles.

== Cast ==
- Soham Chakraborty as Rahul Roy
- Subhashree Ganguly as Gunja
- Avik Chongdar as Boltu
- Mir Afsar Ali as Bijoy Uday Banerjer
- Kanchan Mullick
- Biplab Banerjee as Gunja's father
- Ambarish Bhattacharya as Sushil
- Subhadra as Rahul's mother
- Neel Mukherjee as Rahul's father
- Rupsa Chakraborty as Rahul's elder sister-in-law
- Rima Guha Thakurta as Raka
- Abhijit Guha as Jt. Commissioner of Police Haridas Paul
- Sudeshna Roy as Hostel principal
- Peyal Mukherjee

== Soundtrack ==
Dekh Kemon Lage

Soundtrack album by Jeet Ganguli
- Released: 2017
- Recorded: 2017
- Genre: Feature film soundtrack
- Length: 13:47
- Label: Zee Music Bangla
- Producer: Shyam Sunder Dey

Jeet Ganguli chronology
Chaamp (2017)	Dekh Kemon Lage (2017)

Singles from Dekh Kemon Lage
- 1. "Menoka" Released: 3 July 2017; 2. "Baje Bina" Released: 8 July 2017; 3. "Babar Biye" Released: 15 July 2017; 4. "Let's Dance Kolkata" Released: 18 July 2017

All lyrics are written by Raja Chanda, Chandrani Ganguli; all music is composed by Jeet Gannguli.

No.	Title	Lyrics	Artist (s)	Length
1.	"Menoka"	Raja Chanda	Jeet Gannguli	03:03
2.	"Baje Bina"	Chandrani Gangnuli	Jimut Roy, Mekhla Dasgupta	04:00
3.	"Babar Biye"	Chandrani Gannguli	Shayon Biswas, Chorus	03:34
4.	"Let's Dance Kolkata"	Raja Chanda	Jubin Nautiyal, Palak Muchhal	03:59
