= Abhijit Guha (director) =

Indian film director, actor and writer

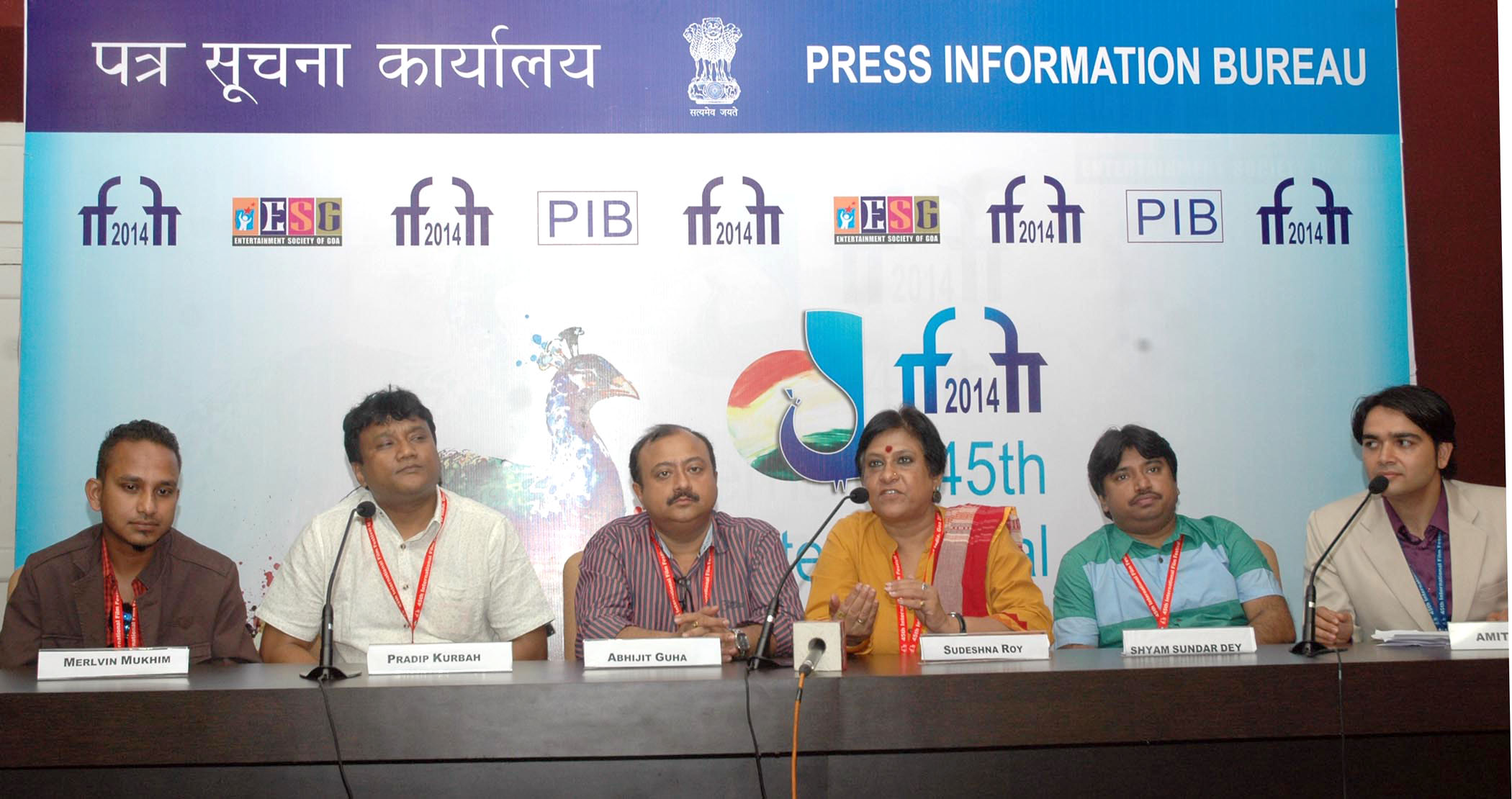
- Guha at the IFFI, 2014
- Born: 12 November 1965 (age 60); Kolkata, India
- Other names: Rana
- Occupations: Film director; Actor; Writer
- Years active: 1994–present
- Notable work: Teen Yaari Katha; Sraboner Dhara; Hercules
- Spouse: Nutan Roychoudhury (m. 2013)
- Children: Satvik Guha (b. 2017)

Abhijit Guha is an Indian film director, actor and writer working in the Bengali film industry. Guha has worked together with Sudeshna Roy in the field of audio visuals since 1994. The duo made their directorial debut with Shudhu Tumi. This duo debuted Abir Chatterjee with Cross Connection in 2009. They gained prominence after their critically acclaimed film Teen Yaari Katha, which is a story of personal struggles and friendship of three lower-middle-class men. Teen Yaari Katha was showcased at the Osian's Cinefan Festival of Asian and Arab Cinema in 2006 and it travelled to the Bangkok International Film as well as Kolkata International Film Festival. Their film Bapi Bari Jaa is considered as classic among the Bangla film lovers for its coming of age storyline and relatable characters. It marked the debut of Arjun Chakraborty and Mimi Chakraborty.

Their film Jodi Love Dilena Praane was another well received film and was selected in the Indian Panorama section of the International Film Festival of India in Goa in 2014. It was showcased at the Pune Film Festival in India, and won a certificate of appreciation at the Fiji International Film Festival in 2015.

Benche Thakar Gaan, directed by the duo, ran in theatres for nine weeks and was selected as the inaugural film for the Kolkata International Film Festival. This was the first time in history that a Bengali language film was given this honour. Their film Sraboner Dhara was a part of the Asian Select Competition Section KIFF 2019, Kolkata. It was showcased in Toronto at the IFFSA fest in May 2019. Their film Aapish has been showcased in KIFF, Mumbai Asian Film Festival and Jagran Film Festival, Delhi.

== Filmography ==
Year	Film	Director	Story	Screenplay	Acting	Notes	Ref.
2004	Shudhu Tumi	Yes	Yes	Yes	Yes	Directorial debut film	
2009	Cross Connection	Yes	No	No	Yes		
2010	Prem By Chance	Yes	Yes	Yes	No		
2012	Teen Yaari Katha	Yes	Yes	Yes	No		
2012	Bapi Bari Jaa	Yes	Yes	No	No		
2014	Biye Notout	Yes	Yes	Yes	Yes		
2014	Jodi Love Dile Na Prane	Yes	No	No	No		
2014	Hercules	Yes	Yes	No	No		
2015	Ekla Cholo	Yes	Yes	Yes	No		
2015	Bitnoon	Yes	Yes	No	No		
2015	Jodi Bolo Hyan	Yes	Yes	No	No	Tele film on Zee Bangla	
2015	Ebhabeo Phire Asha Jay	Yes	Yes	No	No	Tele film on Zee Bangla	
2015	Mayer Biye	Yes	Yes	No	Yes		
2015	Cross Connection 2	Yes	Yes	No	Yes		
2016	Akash Choan	Yes	No	No	No	Tele film on Zee Bangla	
2016	Abar Ekla Cholo	Yes	Yes	No	Yes	Tele film on Zee Bangla	
2016	Benche Thakar Gaan	Yes	Yes	No	No		
2016	Sei Meyeta	Yes	Yes	No	No	Tele film on Zee Bangla	
2017	Chalo Let's Live	Yes	Yes	No	No	Tele film on Zee Bangla	
2017	Dekh Kemon Lage	Yes	Yes	No	Yes		
2018	Jobor Dokhol	Yes	Yes	No	No	Tele film on Zee Bangla	
2018	Virgin Mohito	Yes	Yes	No	No	Web series on Addatimes	
2019	Samsara	Yes	No	No	No		
2020	Sudakshinar Saree	Yes	No	No	Yes	Tele film on Zee Bangla	
2020	Sraboner Dhara	Yes	No	No	Yes		
2020	Biye.com	Yes	No	No	Yes		
2021	Amra 2GayTher	Yes	Yes	No	No	Web series on Klikk	
2021	Phire Dekha	Yes	No	No	No		
2022	Hariye Jaowar Agey	Yes	No	No	No		
2023	Joy Kali Kalkattawali	Yes	Yes	No	No		
2023	Angshuman MBA	Yes	No	No	No		
2024	Shesh Rokkha	Yes	No	No	No	Tele film on Zee Bangla	
2025	Aapish	Yes	Yes	Yes	Yes		

=== As an actor ===
Year	Film	Director	Notes	Ref.
2003	Shubho Mahurat	Rituparno Ghosh		
2013	Meghe Dhaka Tara	Kamaleshwar Mukherjee		
2013	Rupkatha Noy	Atanu Ghosh		
2014	Obhishopto Nighty	Birsa Dasgupta		
2015	Asche Bochor Abar Hobe	Sayan Basu Chowdhury		
2016	Abar Ekla Cholo	Abhijit Guha and Sudeshna Roy	Tele film on Zee Bangla	
2017	Dupur Thakurpo	Debaloy Bhattacharya, Ayan Chakraborti, Subho Pramanik	Web Series on Hoichoi	
2018	Manojder Adbhut Bari	Anindya Chatterjee		
2018	Bultir Result	Pinaki Sarkar		
2018	Ahare Mon	Pratim D. Gupta		
2019	Shantilal O Projapoti Rohoshyo	Pratim D. Gupta		
2020	Love Aaj Kal Porshu	Pratim D. Gupta		
2022	Hatyapuri	Sandip Ray		
2024	Nayan Rahasya	Sandip Ray		
2024	Shastri	Pathikrit Basu		
2025	Aarii	Jiit Chakraborty		

== Television ==
1. Labonyor Sansar
2. Khunje Berai Kachcher Maanush
3. Shashuri Zindabad
4. Taranath Tantrik
5. Kanakanjali
6. Manabi
7. Parama
8. Naari

=== Quiz Programmes ===
1. Sreemoti Budhdhimoti
2. Proshnokhetro
3. Checkmate

=== Children Programmes ===
1. Dekhbo Aami Jagat Take

== Awards & Recognitions ==
- Teen Yaari Katha was showcased in the competition section of Osian's Cinefan Festival of Asian and Arab Cinema in 2012. It travelled to the Bangkok International Film as well as Kolkata International Film Festival.
- Jodi Love Dile Na Prane was selected for Indian Panorama Film Festival in Goa in 2014. Official selection in Pune Film Festival and Hyderabad Film Festival. It won the Certificate of Appreciation at Fiji International Film Festival in 2015.
- Benche Thakar Gaan : The Song of Life was selected as the inaugural film for the Kolkata International Film Festival 2016.
- Sraboner Dhara is a part of the Asian Select Competition Section KIFF 2019, Kolkata. It was showcased in Toronto at the IFFSA fest in May, 2019.
