= Take an Easy Ride =

1976 British film by Kenneth Rowles

- Directed by: Kenneth Rowles
- Screenplay by: Derrick Slater
- Produced by: Kenneth Rowles
- Starring: Helen Bernat; Margaret Heald; Pauleen Bate
- Cinematography: Douglas Hill
- Edited by: KFR Productions
- Music by: De Wolfe
- Production company: Action Plus Productions
- Release date: 1976
- Running time: 44 minutes
- Country: United Kingdom
- Language: English

Take an Easy Ride is a 1976 British sexploitation drama-documentary short film directed by Kenneth Rowles and starring Helen Bernat, Margaret Heald and Pauleen Bate. It was written by Derrick Slater.

== Scenario ==
The film begins with interviews with hitch-hikers and lorry-drivers about their experiences. Several dramatised scenes follow: two girls on their way to a pop festival are picked up by a suspicious truck driver, but arrive safely; two other girls, also hitch-hiking to the festival, get a lift from a man who attacks them; two more girls accept a lift and then kill the driver.

== Cast ==
- Helen Bernat as Anne
- Margaret Heald as Mary
- Pauleen Bate as 1st hitch hiker
- Christianne as 2nd hitch hiker
- Derrick Slater as Mr Ford
- Jeanne Field as Mrs Ford
- Sam Avent as police inspector
- Tony Doonan as doctor
- Charles Erskine as Jock
- Jenny Nevinson as Pam
- Stella Coley as Ruth
- Terry Francis as driver
- Frederick Hogarth as 2nd lorry driver
- Sue Allen Carstairs as 2nd mother
- Ron Patric as 2nd father

== Production ==
Take an Easy Ride was originally intended to be a documentary for Southern TV about the dangers of hitchhiking for young people, but on the advice of porn producer David Grant, Rowles padded out the film with sex scenes, and showed the film theatrically, initially in a 48-week run at Grant's Pigalle cinema club.

== Reception ==
The Monthly Film Bulletin wrote: "A series of meanderingly sensational cautionary tales – with an hysterical word of warning for both gullible hitch-hikers and charitable motorists, and a far more serious warning for cinemagoers lured by sociological pretences into accepting such tired old retreads on titillatory themes as this."

Marjorie Bilbow wrote in Screen International: "As an Awful Warning against hitch-hiking its effect is considerably diminished by the titillation of the sex content and the choice of camera angles when he rapist attacks the two young girls."

In Seventies British Cinema, I.Q. Hunter wrote that the film's "chaos of documentary styles and indifference to narrative render it all but avant-garde. To tell its story of the dangers of hitchhiking, the film combines found footage, dramatisations, flashback reconstructions, allusions to multiple unrelated genres (from the rock film to the giallo) and as many exploitable topics as could be crammed into and stretched out to forty-four minutes: drugs, rape, threesomes, runaway youth and the abiding social problem of homicidal hitchhiking lesbians.

== Home media ==
The film was released on DVD in 2008 by Odeon Entertainment.
