= Bitnoon =

2015 Indian Bengali film

- Theatrical release poster
- Directed by: Abhijit Guha; Sudeshna Roy
- Screenplay by: Padmanabha Dashgupta
- Story by: Sudeshna Roy
- Produced by: Brij Jalan
- Starring: Ritwik Chakraborty; Gargi Roychowdhury; Sayani Ghosh
- Cinematography: Abheri De
- Music by: Raghab Chatterjee; Subhen Chatterjee
- Release date: 3 April 2015
- Running time: 109 min
- Country: India
- Language: Bengali

Bitnoon (Black salt) is a Bengali romantic comedy film directed by Abhijit Guha, Sudeshna Roy and produced by Brij Jalan. This film was released in 2015.

== Plot ==
Rahul is a corporate employee married to Moushumi. They live happily with their six-year-old son, and believe that they cannot be trusted alone. The couple hardly has any time of their own and continue a dull relationship. Once Rahul becomes sexually frustrated and meets with dancer Rusha. He gets into a romantic relationship with her which results in funny consequences.

== Cast ==
- Ritwick Chakraborty as Rahul
- Sayani Ghosh as Rusha
- Gargi Roychowdhury as Mousumi
