= Kalkijug =

- Teaser Poster
- Directed by: Debarati Gupta
- Screenplay by: Ranajay Banerjee
- Produced by: Pradip Churiwal
- Starring: Bratya Basu; Debshankar Halder; Locket Chatterjee; Rimjhim Mitra; Sourav chakraborty (actor)
- Cinematography: Joydeep Bose
- Edited by: Souvik Dasgupta
- Music by: Raja Narayan Deb
- Production company: Macneill Engineering Ltd.
- Release date: 31 July 2016
- Country: India
- Language: Bengali

Kalkijug (Bengali: কল্কিযুগ kol-kee-joog, meaning Age of Kalki) is an Indian Bengali thriller film directed by Debarati Gupta, and produced by Macneill Engineering Ltd. It features Bratya Basu and Debshankar Halder in lead roles. The film was scheduled for release in the end of July 2015.

The film depicts a clash of ego between two brilliant minds that pans out dramatically when an old unsolved murder mystery resurfaces out of the blue.

== Cast ==
- Bratya Basu as ACP Dilip Dutta
- Debshankar Halder as Sankarshan Gupta
- Rimjhim Mitra as Viji/Sub Inspector Vijaylakshmi
- Locket Chatterjee as Sukanya Ray
- Sourav Chakraborty as Arpan/Sub Inspector Arpan Sarkar
- Paulami Basu as Enakshi Dutta

== Soundtrack ==
The music of Kalkijug is composed by Raja Narayan Deb. The music features a western style of music fused with Indian percussions.

Kalkijug Soundtrack
No.	Title	Lyrics	Music	Singer(s)	Length
1.	"Rong Chena Daye"	Sovan Bhattacharya	Raja Narayan Deb	Tanya	4:36
Total length:					4:36
