= Ekla Cholo =

- Official Poster Ekla Cholo
- Screenplay by: Padmanabha Dasgupta
- Story by: Abhijit Guha; Sudeshna Roy
- Directed by: Abhijit Guha; Sudeshna Roy
- Starring: Saayoni Ghosh; June Malia; Koushik Roy
- Music by: Savvy
- Country of origin: India
- Original language: Bengali

Production
- Producers: Zee Bangla Cinema; Prosenjit Chatterjee

Original release
- Release: 19 January 2015

Ekla Cholo is a 2015 Bengali television movie directed by Abhijit Guha and Sudeshna Roy. The movie features Saayoni Ghosh and June Malia in the main roles. The film was jointly produced by Zee Bangla Cinema and Prosenjit Chatterjee. In 2014, Zee Bangla Cinema and Prosenjit Chatterjee agreed to jointly produce movies to be shown directly on TV. Ekla Cholo was the first attempt by the partnership, and the film enjoyed widespread popularity and received 21a score of in Target Rating Point.

== Plot ==
Ekla Cholo is a romantic comedy about a woman who wants to become a single mother. Betrayed and disappointed by her last boyfriend and inspired by her mother, she wishes to raise a child without a man in her life. She is faced with many challenges. That is when Riya meets Rupam.

== Cast ==
- Saayoni Ghosh as Riya
- June Malia as Riya's Mom
- Koushik Roy as Rupam
- Anindya Chatterjee as Riya's ex-boyfriend

== Sequel ==
A sequel named Abar Ekla Cholo has been released in 2016.
