= Shomshuklla =

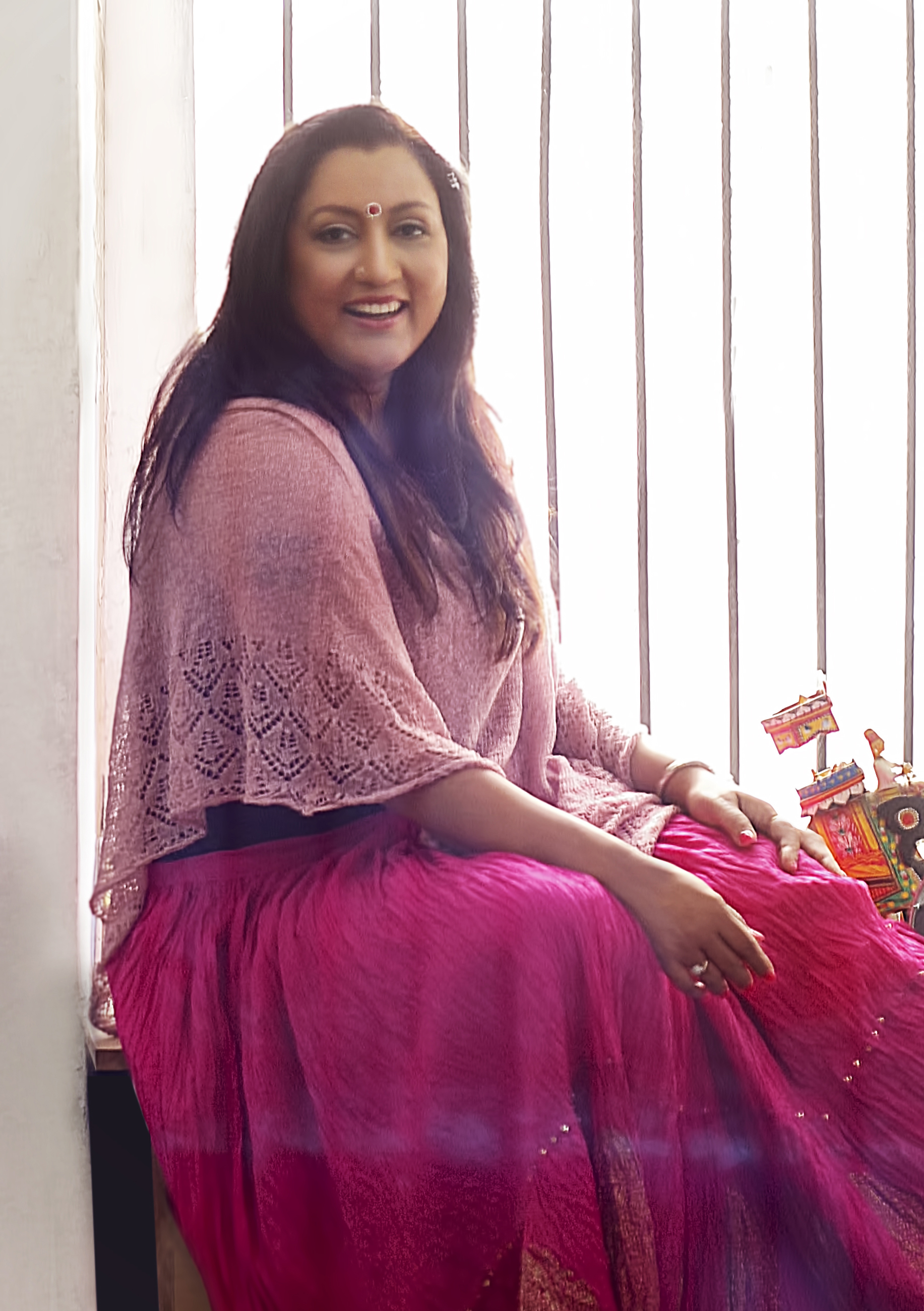
- Shomshuklla in July 2013
- Born: Kolkata, India
- Occupations: Singer, poet, playwright, film Director, actor, theater director
- Website: cuttocut.com

Shomshuklla is an Indian film director, script writer, theatre personality, singer and writer.

== Early life ==
Shomshuklla was born in Kolkata to Bengali parents, her father who was a student of Rabindranath Tagore at Shantiniketan and her mother who was a lecturer. At the age of seven, she joined Dakshinee, an acclaimed music teaching institution to learn the music form 'Rabindra Sangeet'. In 1985, she met Bhaskar Das on a mini bus in Kolkata and tied the knot with him six months later. The couple had their only child, Uditvanu Das in 1989. It was in 1990 that she relocated from Kolkata to Ahmedabad and joined Krishnakant Parekh, a disciple of Pandit Jasraj to study and learn music. In 1995, she left Ahmedabad for Mumbai to embark on her creative career. In Mumbai, she started learning classical music from the renowned Dr. Prabha Atre from the year 1995 onwards. She was a columnist with Asian Age, writing about relationships and also an interior designer, designing eclectic homes.

== Career ==
=== Music ===
Her first Indi Pop was Dhin Tara, produced by Times Music and released in 1998. Her second album Raahien was released in 2001 and a music video for it was shot in Corsica. A couple of years later in 2003, Shomshuklla released her first album of remixes titled ‘Glimpse’. Cafe Kalighat (2004) and Kolkata Jam (2006), her fourth and fifth albums, composed of Rabindra Sangeet fusion into the world music genre. Electrik was her second last album which released in 2005 and her last album as a singer ‘Sonic Frames’ released in 2008. Shomshuklla released 2 Bengali modern song music albums Mukto Paakhi (2001) and Chuye Jete Moon (2003), as well.

=== Poetry ===
In 2006, she published poetry with Rupa Publications, and released her first book ‘I Have Seen That Face Before’. A year later, she wrote her second book of poetry, ‘Close Every Door’ with Rupa Publications and was launched by Award-winning lyricist and ad man Prasoon Joshi at Crossword in Mumbai. Shomshuklla's third book of poems ‘Seconds Before Sunrise’ was published in 2009. The honours were done by noted ad-man Piyush Pandey. Shomshuklla's fifth book of poems, Do Not Stand So Close To Me in 2009, was launched by Pritish Nandy. During the launch she read some insightful poems about being a mother and her bond with her son. ‘Easy’, the 7th book of poetry by Shomshuklla, was launched in December 2013 at the famous Kitab Khana by Brinda Miller, the famous canvas artist and lady behind the landmark KalaGhoda Arts Festival in Mumbai. The lucid words are accompanied alongside photographs by ace photographer and award-winning Cinematographer, Ritam Banerjee.

Shomshuklla has also written two books of Bengali poetry, 'Chulta Elomelo' (2009) in Kolkata and 'Ekti Manusher Khoje' (2012) launched by Sahitya Academy award winner, Bani Basu and actor Nigel Akkara at the Kolkata Book Fair.

=== Theatre ===
Shomshuklla owns a theater company by the name of ‘Kali Theatre’ which was established in 2006. The company staged their first play ‘I Have Gone Marking’ to house-full halls at Prithvi Theatre in Mumbai. During this time, she also was the first artist to reinvent Rabindra Sangeet for global audiences with Kolkata Jam. Flawless, a three-woman centric story, staged on 2007. Flawless, a three-woman centric story, was staged on 2007. In 2008, she performed her play ‘Sometimes’ in Kolkata to packed houses and just a year later she staged her play ‘Tonight I can write’ with her company Kali Theatre. This is one of the only theatre companies to have performed at the prestigious Edinburgh Fringe Festival. The play, ‘We Draupadi's and Sitas’ premiered in 2011 on such a global stage. She continued to stage more plays with her troop such as Queen Mandodari, Roti Kapra Makan and Radio Epic amongst others. Her latest play, ‘Oh Gandhari, Oh Kunti!’ showcased at the prestigious Kala Ghoda Arts Festival 2013 held in Mumbai, India.

=== Actor ===
Shomshuklla starred in the film Murals in 2018, for which she was nominated as the Best Lead Actress at the Nice International Film Festival in 2018.

=== Films ===
Shomshuklla is a self taught art house filmmaker. She started shooting her first feature film in 2012, Sandcastle - and the rest of the films followed. She has won several international acclaims for her feature films, which have also became part of curriculum at the University of Maryland, film study curriculum. Her films became part of the PhD thesis at the University of Maryland, as well. An award has been created after her name in Festival in US, Angaelica, to identify new talents, called "The Shom Award". One of her films, " Light Wraps Me", has been selected in the prestigious Florence Binneale to be part of their program.

Shomshuklla has been appointed as a Jury member for Film Fest International, a group of film festivals based in London.

==== Sandcastle (2013) ====
Sandcastle was an independent film directed by Shomshuklla, which released in India on 14 March 2014. Conceptualized back in the year 2006, it is the story of Sheila, a home-maker, an aspiring writer and a loving mother. From an outsider's perspective, it would seem like she has the perfect life. Husband being an advertising maverick, she is part of the elite upper middle class of Indian society. The concept of Sandcastle reflects one's belief to be able to build a perfect life. The focus of the film is on women in urban India. The face of women in India has been changing over the ages into a form much more independent and in control of their individual destinies. Through Sandcastle, Shomshuklla aimed to show the two colliding worlds of acceptance and breaking out of the modern Indian woman.

Before its release in India, Sandcastlewas nominated in various categories at numerous international film festivals including the Tenerife International Film Festival, London International Film Festival and LA Femme International Feature. Ritam Banerjee's work on Sandcastle won it the best cinematography award at the Tenerife Film Festival.

In the later part of 2014, the film competed as one of the entries for The Academy Awards, commonly known as The Oscars, from India for the 2015 Academy Awards selection.

==== Chhutii Aar Picnic (Original Title : Picnic) (2013) ====
Chhutii Aar Picnic (A holiday and a picnic) is an upcoming romantic drama directed by Shomshuklla starring Shahana Chatterjee, Uditvanu Das & Sohini Mukherjee Roy. The film is based on Rabindranath Tagore's popular romantic novella, Shesher Kobita, one of his most popular novellas. Chhutii Aar Picnic has been nominated for Best Supporting Actor, Best Original Screenplay, Best Director and Best Feature Film categories at the Madrid International Film Festival held in July 2014.

==== Hopscotch (2015) ====
Hopscotch is a psychological thriller directed by Shomshuklla. Starring Sohini Mukherjee Roy, Hopscotch tells the story of a young woman who returns home one day to find that a childhood friend, she once lost, is back to play games with her. Hopscotch has received multiple nominations at the recently concluded Madrid International Film Festival, Tenerife International Film Festival and won numerous awards.

==== Tiktok Tiktok (2016) ====
Starring Mia Maelzer, Uditvanu Das and Sohini Mukherjee Roy, Tiktok Tiktok is a surreal romance between a restaurateur and a journalist, directed by Shomshuklla. Tiktok Tiktok won the award at the Nice International Film Festival for Best Original Screenplay.

==== White Bee (2016) ====
Starring Tanu Kurien Vaswani and Sumanto Chattopadhyay, White Bee is a film where a couple meets, after a separation – perhaps for the last time. The woman seems vulnerable, broken by the failed marriage. The man appears blasé about the break-up. If he expresses any doubts, they are about the ability of his wife to cope with the big bad world outside the cocoon of marriage. But as the story unfolds, it emerges that the woman is resilient, and it is he who is vulnerable – and needy of the shelter of their togetherness.

==== Mixed Medium (2017) ====
The film Mixed Medium [28], starring Teesay, explores the lives of artists as they navigate the contrast between their real and reel lives. It is a journey of how surreal their work and life are, whereas in real life, a simple cup of coffee can enlighten their day. Life full of mixed mediums and a way they live their life, sometimes artistically or sometimes intellectually. They may be in their dream world, full of aspirations but it's the rain that brings them to reality. It's a story of how they rehearse and perform for their stage show, and contradict to that how relax they like to be in their own space. Also, you will get to see how romance and love play a critical role in each day of their lives.

==== Flowers and Lap of a Rose (2017) ====
Starring Bharat Dabholkar and Ria Patel, Flowers and Lap of a Rose is a story of an established poet where the poet's writing of a new sonnet was inspired by his love of a charismatic girl.

==== Murals (2017) ====
Starring Shomshuklla Das and Sumanto Chattopadhyay, Murals is the story of a couple who were once lovers, meet in a resort after few years by chance. It is a mixed feeling of emotions. They went through the reason of their breakup and are eager to know about what would have happened in all these years of parting and are in a dilemma whether to get back into the relationship again.

==== The Bird (2018) ====
The Bird is a story of a successful corporate woman, who suddenly realised the futility of her corporate life and plans to get back to her family.

==== Bunch Of Grapes (2018) ====
Starring Catherine Black and Sharmila Roy Choudhury, Bunch of Grapes is a story of a mother and daughter. It portrays an evolving relationship between a mother and daughter. It shows the complications, positives, and negatives of the relationship. Have created difficulties between the two. No mother is happy with their daughters and vice versa.

==== Light Wraps Me (2019) ====
Starring Lipi Goyal and Archana Singh, Light Wraps Me tells a story about how men are a gregarious animal. They have a different passion to live and absorb life. The film also builds the journey and characters of 3 women in search of love, life and existence in the form of their freedom and independence.

==== Aaedon (2020) ====
Aaedon tells the story of the eternal search of love, life and spirituality. A mother talks about the intricacies of life to her young daughter, who blissfully listens to her discourse while playing her violin, through which she searches for her spirituality. It stars Adeon Young and Alexandria Cook.

==== When I, I love you (2020) ====
When I, I love you is the story of a writer who is writing his novel of the same name. He is wanting to be with his beloved who is totally indifferent to his presence and dwells in a world of illusion. The writer urges to her return to his love and life.

==== Mount Umer (2021) ====
Mount Umer is a story of a girl, who is waiting for her lover, to come and take care of her. She met with her accident when she was with her lover, and she has gone paralyzed. Her lover is a doctor who is researching on the new method of medical science to cure such patients. It's a love story, of a girl waiting for her doctor lover.

== Filmography ==
Year	Films Directed	Notes
2013	Sandcastle	Tenerife International Film Festival: Won: Best Cinematography (Ritam Banerjee); Nominated: Sandcastle – Best Cinematography, Best Supporting Actor, Best Female Lead, Best Feature Film; London International Film Festival: Nominated: Best Foreign Language Feature, Best Director of a Foreign Language Feature, Best Original Story, Best Cinematography; LA Femme International Feature: Official Selection Madrid International Film Festival: Nominated: Best Story, Best Foreign Language Feature Film; Mexico International Film Festival: Won: 2015 Bronze Palm Award – First Time Filmmaker
2014	Chhutii Aar Picnic (Changed from original name : Picnic)	Madrid International Film Festival: Won: Best Cinematography; Nominated: Best Original Screenplay of a Foreign Language Film, Best Supporting Actor (Female), Best Cinematography, Best Lead Actor (Male), Best Directing of a Foreign Language Film; Columbia Gorge International Film Festival: Won: Best Cinematography; International Filmmaker Festival of World Cinema: Won: Best Male Lead (Uditvanu Das) in a Foreign Language Film; Mexico International Film Festival: Won: 2015 Bronze Palm Award – Narrative Feature Competition
2015	Hopscotch	St. Tropez & Nice International Film Festival: Won: Best Original Screenplay for a Foreign Language Film; Mexico International Film Festival: Won: 2015 Golden Palm – Best Narrative Feature; Milan International Film Festival: Won: Best Actress, Sohini Mukherjee Roy; International Filmmaker Festival of World Cinema: Won: Best Actress, Sohini Mukherjee Roy; Tenerife International Film Festival: Won: Best Actress, Sohini Mukherjee Roy; Columbia Gorge International Film Festival: Won: Most Ambitious Feature Film; International Horror Hotel Festival: Won: Suspense – Thriller Award; Berlin International Film Festival: Won: Best Original Screenplay of a Foreign Language Film
2016	TikTok	St. Tropez & Nice International Film Festival: Won: Best Original Screenplay of a Feature Film; Milan International Film Festival 2016: Won: Best Editing of a feature film; Festival Angaelica 2016: Won: International Experimental Film; Columbia Gorge International Film Festival 2016: Won: International Experimental Film; London IFF 2017: Official Selection: Best Original Screenplay of a Feature Film
2016	White Bee	Madrid International Film Festival: Won: Best Actress, Tanu Kurien Vaswani; Milan International Film Festival 2017: Nominated: Best Original Screenplay of a Feature Film, Best Feature Film; London International Film Festival 2018: Nominated: Best Story, Best Lead Actor; Mexico International Film Festival 2018: Won: Golden Palm Award
2017	Mixed Medium	Milan International Film Festival 2017: Won: Best Editing of a Feature Film, Priyank Yadav; Nominated: Best Film, Best Director, Best Lead Actress, Lipi Goyal, Best Cinematography in a Feature Film; London International Film Festival 2018: Won: Best Original Screenplay of a Feature Film; Nominated: Best Original Screenplay, Best Cinematography, Best Feature Film, Best Supporting Actress, Best Lead Actress; Nice International Film Festival 2018: Nominated: Best Original Screenplay, Best Feature Film, Best Original Score, Best Cinematography, Best Lead Actress
2017	Flowers and a Lap of Rose	London International Film Festival 2017: Nominated: Best Feature Film, Best Cinematography in a Feature Film; Amsterdam International Film Festival 2018: Won: Best Director; Nominated: Best Original Screenplay of a Feature Film, Best Editing of a Feature Film; Madrid International Film Festival 2018: Won: Best Director; Nominated: Best Director, Best Cinematography; Berlin International Film Festival 2017: Won: Best Costume; Festival Angaelica 2017: Won: Legacy Award – The Shom Award; Mexico International Film Festival 2018: Won: Golden Palm Award for Narrative Feature
2017	Murals	London International Film Festival 2017: Nominated: Best Director, Best Editing; Madrid International Film Festival 2018: Won: Best Cinematography; Nice International Film Festival 2018: Won: Best Editing of a Feature Film
2018	The Bird	Nice International Film Festival 2019: Won: Best Original Screenplay of a Feature Film; Madrid International Film Festival 2019: Nominated: Best Editing of a Feature Film, Best Cinematography in a Feature Film
2018	Bunch Of Grapes	London International Film Festival 2019: Won: Best Editing of a Feature Film; Nominated: Best Director, Best Editing of a Feature Film, Best Cinematography in a Feature Film; Mexico International Film Festival 2019: Won: Best Director; Madrid International Film Festival 2019: Nominated: Best Editing of a Feature Film, Best Story; Milan International Film Festival 2019: Nominated: Best Editing of a Foreign Language Feature Film, Best Story
2019	Light Wraps Me	Madrid International Film Festival 2019: Won: Best Visual Effects; Nominated: Best Set Design; Milan International Film Festival 2019: Won: Best Original Score; Nominated: Best Original Score, Best Hair, Makeup & Body Design; London International Film Festival 2020: Nominated: Best Costume, Best Visual Effects, Best Original Score, Best Set Design
2020	Aaedon	London International Film Festival 2020: Won: Best Original Score; Nice International Film Festival 2020: Won: Best Cinematography in a Feature Film; Antwerp International Film Festival 2020: Won: Best Cinematography in a Feature Film; Festival Angelica 2020: Won: Best International Experimental Film; Milan International Film Festival 2021: Won: Best Editing of a Feature Film; World Independent Cinema Awards 2021: Won: Best Editing of a Feature Film; Won: Best Original Screenplay of a Feature Film
2020	When I, I love you	Madrid International Film Festival: Won: Best Editing of a Feature Film; Antwerp International Film Festival 2020: Won: Best Sound Design; Milan International Film Festival 2021: Won: Best Lead Actress, Sarah Ahmed; Edinburgh IFF 2022: Won: Best Hair, Makeup & Costume; Paris IFF 2022: Won: Best Editing of an English Language Film; WICA 2025: Won: Best Editing; Won: The Best Director Short Movie
2021	Mount Umer	London International Film Festival 2021: Won: Best Lead Actor; Won: Best Cinematography in a Feature Film; Nice International Film Festival 2021: Won: Best Cinematography in a Feature Film; Madrid International Film Festival 2021: Won: Best Set Design in a Feature Film; Milan International Film Festival 2021: Won: Best Set Design in a Feature Film; Antwerp International Film Festival 2021: Won: Iti Pawar for Outstanding Actress in an English Language Feature Film; Edinburgh IFF 2022: Won: Best Cinematography; Canterbury IFF 2022: Won: Best Cinematography; Paris IFF 2022: Won: Best Music; Barcelona IFF 2022: Won: Best Editing; Won: Best Sound Design; Rome FFI 2022: Won: Best Editing; World International Cinema Award (WICA), Edinburgh. 2023: Won: Best Sound Design
2023	Lifetime Achievement Award	Madrid International Film Festival: Shomshuklla received a Lifetime Achievement Award from Madrid International Film Festival jury for her work in art house films.

== Artistic Style and Themes ==
Shomshuklla is a self taught film director. In the initial years of filmmaking she was highly influenced by Alphonso, Jean Luc Godard, Almodovar, kieslowski, David Cronenberg, Chaplin, Satyajit Ray, Inger Bergman and Polanski. Her first feature film, Sandcastle was compared to the style of Terence Mallick. In all of her films, music plays an important role. In her third film, she uses only one actor to tell the full story. In her fourth film, TikTok TikTok, she introduced her style of voice sound mix, which became her signature style.
She introduced no sync dialogues to create the feeling of playing with sounds. As she was influenced by Chaplin, she realized a silent film. She believes in breaking all rules and creating one's own. In her film, The Bird, containing stills and video, thus using the oldest art form to tell her story, in a single space. The style that she used in many of her films.
She repeated her scenes in film, to break the stereotype, like in Flowers and the lap of rose. In the film, Mixed medium, she used the same dialogue with different actors to enact it differently, thus creating a unique style. Her style is versatile and unique.

== Books ==
Year of Launch	Name of Poetry Book
2006	I Have Seen That Face Before
2007	Close Every Door
2009	Seconds Before Sunrise
2010	Chul Ta Elomelo
2011	Do Not Stand So Close To Me
2012	Ekta Manusher Khoje
2013	Easy

== Music albums ==
Year of Launch	Album name	Notes
1998	Dhin Tara	Hear the music
2001	Raahein	Hear the music
2001	Mukto Paakhi	Free bird (Bengali to English Translation). Shomshuklla's second Bengali modern songs album.
2003	Glimpse	Hear the music
2003	Chuye Jete Moon	The Inner Rhythm (Bengali to English Translation). Shomshuklla's first Bengali modern songs album.
2004	Café Kalighat	Shomshuklla's first album with Rabindra Sangeet fusion into the world music genre.
2006	Kolkata Jam	Shomshuklla's second album with Rabindra Sangeet fusion into the world music genre.
2006	Electrik	Hear the music
2008	Sonic Frames	Hear the music

== Plays ==
Year of Launch	Name of Play	Notes
2006	I Have Gone Marking	
2007	Flawless	
2008	Sometimes	
2009	Tonight I Can Write	
2010	We Draupadis & Sitas	Performed at the Edinburgh Fringe Festival
2011	Queen Mandodari	
2011	Radio Epic	
2012	Roti Kapra Makaan	
2013	Oh Gandhari, Oh Kunti	
