= Dakbaksho =

2015 Indian Bengali film

- Theatrical poster
- Directed by: Prosenjit Choudhury; Abhijit Chowdhury
- Written by: Prosenjit Choudhury; Abhijit Chowdhury
- Based on: Shakti Chattopadhyay's poem 'Postman in the Autumn's wood'
- Produced by: Supriti Choudhury; Prosenjit Choudhury
- Starring: Satrajit Sarkar; Supriti Choudhury; Pradip Roy
- Cinematography: Prosentjit Chowdhury AKA Prosenjit C (Pro)
- Edited by: Prosentjit Chowdhury AKA Prosenjit C (Pro); Prasenjit Choudhury
- Music by: Prosenjit Choudhury
- Distributed by: Piyali Films
- Release date: 26 June 2015
- Running time: 111 minutes
- Country: India
- Language: Bengali

Dakbaksho (Bengali: ডাকবাক্স Daak-Baksho, meaning The Letter Box) is an Indian psychological thriller film directed by Prosenjit Choudhury. The film stars Supriti Choudhury, Satrajit Sarkar and Pradip Roy in principal roles. The film was released on 26 June 2015.

== Synopsis ==
Telegram services have been shut down for ever. Postal service is waiting for the death knell as well. At this time, one starts dropping letters in a letter box, which has been abandoned for many years. These letters carry no addresses on them. The contents of the letters are suspicious and clearly indicate a conspiracy; a sinister one, to murder someone.

Parallelly, for a reason unknown, perhaps political interference, Srija, a renowned documentary filmmaker, detaches herself from her job, while a mysterious photographer makes way into her house. As the dark recesses of the characters are revealed the audience is hurled into a tale of deception, horror and faced with questions regarding the identity of the girl, the intentions of the photographer and finally how is all this related to a letter box?

And a game begins, a mystery unfolds.

== Cast ==
- Supriti Choudhury as Srija: a young Bengali documentary filmmaker
- Satrajit sarkar as Avro: a mysterious photographer
- Pradip Roy as The Old man: an elderly mysterious figure who seems to be conducting a grave mission
- Pradip Moulik as Barunda: Srija's friend
- Subrata Chokroborty as Ambar: Srija's Husband
- Bitan Biswas
- Nibedita Nag Tahabildar
- Ruby Santra
- Priya Dutta
- Pubali Saha
- Ilika Bandyopadhyay as Ambar's Mistress
- Prosenjit Choudhury: Cameo
- Abhijit Choudhury
- Debopriya Roy
- Tapan Bhattacharya
- Nasir Mallick
- Amit Mahato
- Batuk Mukherkee

== Production ==
=== Development ===
Dakbaksho, for Prosenjit Choudhury, is an effort to create a visual story out of Shakti Chattopadhyay's famous poem "Postman in the Autumn's wood". The biggest challenge was to create the silence out of all the cacophonies, to search the pain and emptiness out of all the drama, humour and thrill of the story.

=== Filming ===
Shooting for the film began in 2013. Although most of the film is shot in Kolkata a considerable part was shot in Mandarmani, Digha, Talsari & Ichapore.

== Music ==
The music for the film has been composed by Prosenjit Choudhury with help from Satrajit sarkar, Abhijit choudhury and Mainak Bhowmik. The songs, including 'Kakeder Gaan' & 'Shopno Dekhi Shopno Dekhao Tai' are voiced by Manomoy Bhattacharya, Rupankar, Mom, Sunetra & #Abhikism.

== Release ==
The film was released in India in June 2015.
