= IFSA Network =

- International Finance Students Association Network
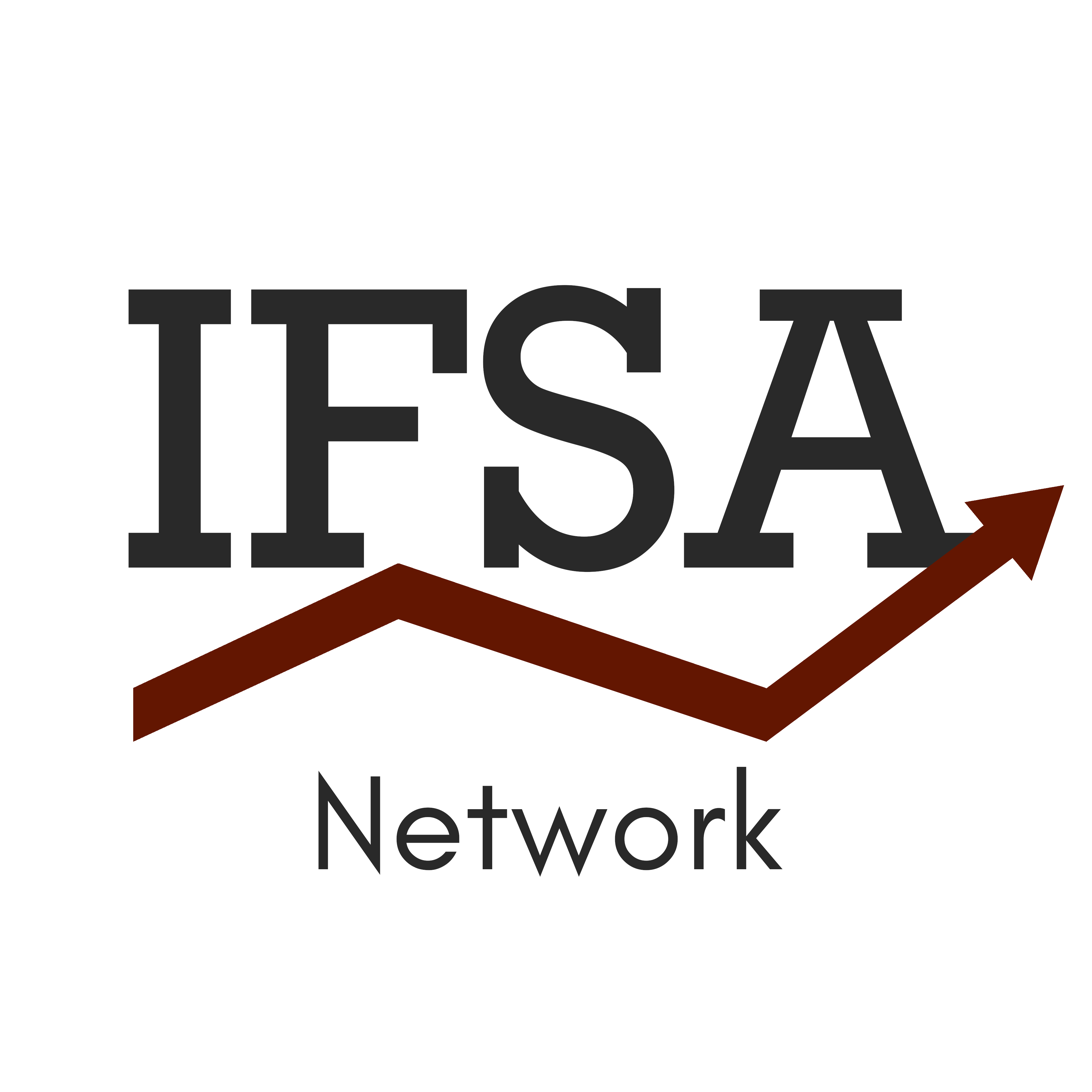
- Abbreviation: IFSA
- Established: 2014; 12 years ago in Rotterdam, Netherlands
- Type: Professional association
- Purpose: Community for individuals studying Finance
- Location: Geneva, Switzerland
- Region served: Worldwide
- Members: 1,500 active members (15,000 alumni) (2023)
- Official language: English
- Funding: Its members
- Website: ifsa-network.com

The IFSA Network formerly known as the International Finance Students Association Network, is a global non-profit network of finance student associations to help student members develop the skills and contacts to be active in the financial market. It is exclusively run by students. It was initially based at the Rotterdam School of Management.

The network operates under a decentralized yet cohesive organizational structure and is split into regional chapters.

== History ==
The International Finance Student Association traces its roots back to 2014 in Rotterdam, specifically at the Rotterdam School of Management. The initial purpose of the network was to create a community for individuals studying Finance, fostering connections both amongst themselves and with established figures in the financial sector.

A new structure was brought in from the 2024-25 tenure to better deal with the delegation of responsibilities as the network continued to expand. The leadership team now consists of a three-member board - the Chairperson, Vice-Chairperson and Treasurer - and a five-member Executive Committee, comprising the respective heads of APAC, EMEA and LATAM, Head of Communications and Head of Operations.

== Structure ==
=== Chapters ===
The IFSA Network operates under a decentralized yet cohesive organizational structure designed to balance local autonomy with global coordination. Situated in educational institutions across the world, the individual chapters serve as semi-independent units, each governed by their own board comprising at least a Chairman, Vice-Chairman, Treasurer, and General Secretary. These boards manage day-to-day operations and supervise regional activities tailored to meet the specific needs and interests of their local student bodies. Chapters also usually have specialized departments, such as Finance, Marketing, and Events, each headed by a department manager who oversees a team of analysts.

=== The Supervisory Board ===
==== Supervisory Board members ====
Tenure	Chairperson	Vice-Chairperson	Head of EMEA	Head of APAC	Head of LATAM
2023-2024	Ritien Mohan (IFSA BITS Pilani)	Nathanaël G. Dürst (IFSA Geneva)	Ridhima Shrivastava (IFSA Rotterdam)	Parinnay Chaudhry (IFSA SSCBS) / Suhani Jain (IFSA Hansraj)	Francisco Gajardo (IFSA UDP)
2022-2023	Nele Bredtmann (IFSA Rotterdam)	Santiago Delgadillo Gómez (IFSA Colombia)	Nathanaël G. Dürst (IFSA Geneva)	Shrusti Singh (IFSA Hansraj)	Ignacio Pinto (IFSA UdeSA)
2021-2022	Ornella Gallo (IFSA UCEMA)	N/A	Iulia Rumeus (IFSA Geneva) / Janusz Skipiol (IFSA Rotterdam)	Sandesh Dholakia (IFSA Hansraj) / Aditya Mahajan (IFSA SSCBS)	Pablo Torres Alarcón (IFSA Colombia)

=== New structure (2024-25 to present) ===
From 2024-25, the leadership team was changed to of a three-member board - the Chairperson, Vice-Chairperson and Treasurer - and a five-member Executive Committee, comprising the respective heads of APAC, EMEA and LATAM, Head of Communications and Head of Operations.

=== The Board ===
Tenure	Chairperson	Vice-Chairperson	Treasurer
2025-2026	Sneha Koley (IFSA NIT Trichy)	Sviatoslav Akimov (IFSA NES BFS)	Arunava Bhattacharya (IFSA IIT Kharagpur)
2024-2025	Danel Aibolatova (IFSA Warsaw)	Riddhimaa Biyani (IFSA IIT Kharagpur)	Tushar Vigh (IFSA BITS Pilani)

=== The Executive Committee ===
Tenure	Head of Operations	Head of Communication	Head of APAC	Head of EMEA	Head of LATAM
2025-2026	Shreyarn Moitra (IFSA NIT Trichy)	Sabreen K. Shergill (IFSA LSR)	Rohan Gupta (IFSA DTU)	Reena Tandon (IFSA Cooper Union)	Daniel Fernando Rubiano Zapata (IFSA ICESI)
2024-2025	Kavya Kathuria (IFSA LSR)	Alina Selyanina (IFSA Geneva)	Ankur Soni (IFSA BITS Pilani)	Alp Mete Zincirli (IFSA Rotterdam)	Sebastian Alrgarrra Rojas (IFSA Sergio Arboleda)

== Key initiatives ==
=== Traders' Cup ===
The IFSA Trader’s Cup is the world’s largest student run trading challenge. All people studying in a recognised university are free to participate. The competition relies on securities trading, and aims to give students an opportunity to distinguish themselves from the competition. The competition is held once per academic year, starting in spring of 2016. For the second edition of the competition, students from more than 35 universities, located in 28 countries on 6 continents competed.

=== Global Case Competition at Harvard ===
The Global Case Competition at Harvard is the world’s most prestigious case competition organized by students. During the first edition, a team from HEC Paris, a leading French university, won the challenge. The second edition was won by the London Business School.

=== Local venues ===
The various IFSA Network chapters try to offer their communities various local events to connect with the professional world. Often, an industry professional will come to the IFSA Network events and meet students. The purpose of those venues is to give students a taste of the professional world, share tips and knowledge, and give an opportunity to network.

=== Boston Consulting Group Case Competition ===
In 2018, the IFSA Network in cooperation with the Boston Consulting Group and InvestSoc, organised the first, three-week long International Cape Town Case Competition. The competition has a unique format where teams consisting of 2 to 4 participants, propose solutions for crises that are presented to them. In their solutions, participants are able to showcase their knowledge, creativity and problem-solving skills on a current macroeconomic issue. A jury picks the 15 best international teams and the best local teams, from Cape Town. The selected teams arrive in Cape Town, South Africa, to participate in the second round, and present in front of a select panel. The winning team is awarded a cash prize of 5000 South African Rand.

== Chapters ==
It has established chapters in the Netherlands, Switzerland, Russia, Colombia, Argentina, Chile, and India among other locations. These chapters focus on providing localized resources, events, workshops, and competitions aimed at career development and knowledge acquisition in finance. As of 2023, The IFSA Network has the following chapters:

Chapter's Name	Chapter's Logo	Chapter's Region	Chapter's Country	Chapter's City	Chapter's College
IFSA Rotterdam		EMEA	Netherlands	Rotterdam	Erasmus University Rotterdam
IFSA Geneva		EMEA	Switzerland	Geneva	University of Geneva
IFSA Oslo		EMEA	Norway	Oslo	BI Norwegian Business School
IFSA Warsaw		EMEA	Poland	Warsaw	Vistula University
IFSA NES BFS		EMEA	Russia	Moscow	New Economic School
IFSA SSCBS		Asia-Pacific	India	New Delhi	Shaheed Sukhdev College of Business Studies
IFSA BITS Pilani		Asia-Pacific	India	Pilani	BITS Pilani
IFSA Hansraj		Asia-Pacific	India	New Delhi	Hansraj College
IFSA LSR		Asia-Pacific	India	New Delhi	Lady Shri Ram College
IFSA SRCC		Asia-Pacific	India	New Delhi	Shri Ram College of Commerce
IFSA St. Stephen’s		Asia-Pacific	India	New Delhi	St. Stephen's College, Delhi
IFSA IIT Kharagpur		Asia-Pacific	India	Kharagpur	IIT Kharagpur
IFSA DTU		Asia-Pacific	India	New Delhi	Delhi Technological University
IFSA IIFT		Asia-Pacific	India	New Delhi	Indian Institute of Foreign Trade
IFSA UdeSA		Latin America	Argentina	Buenos Aires	University of San Andrés
IFSA UCEMA		Latin America	Argentina	Buenos Aires	University of CEMA
IFSA UDP		Latin America	Chile	Huechuraba	Diego Portales University
IFSA Utadeo		Latin America	Colombia	Bogotá	Jorge Tadeo Lozano University
IFSA Finvext Club		Latin America	Colombia	Bogotá	Externado University of Colombia
IFSA Finance Club UdeMedellín		Latin America	Colombia	Medellin	University of Medellin
IFSA Bufete Capital		Latin America	Colombia	Medellin	EAFIT University
IFSA Sergio Arboleda		Latin America	Colombia	Bogotá	Universidad Sergio Arboleda
