= Sudeshna Roy =

Indian Bengali film director

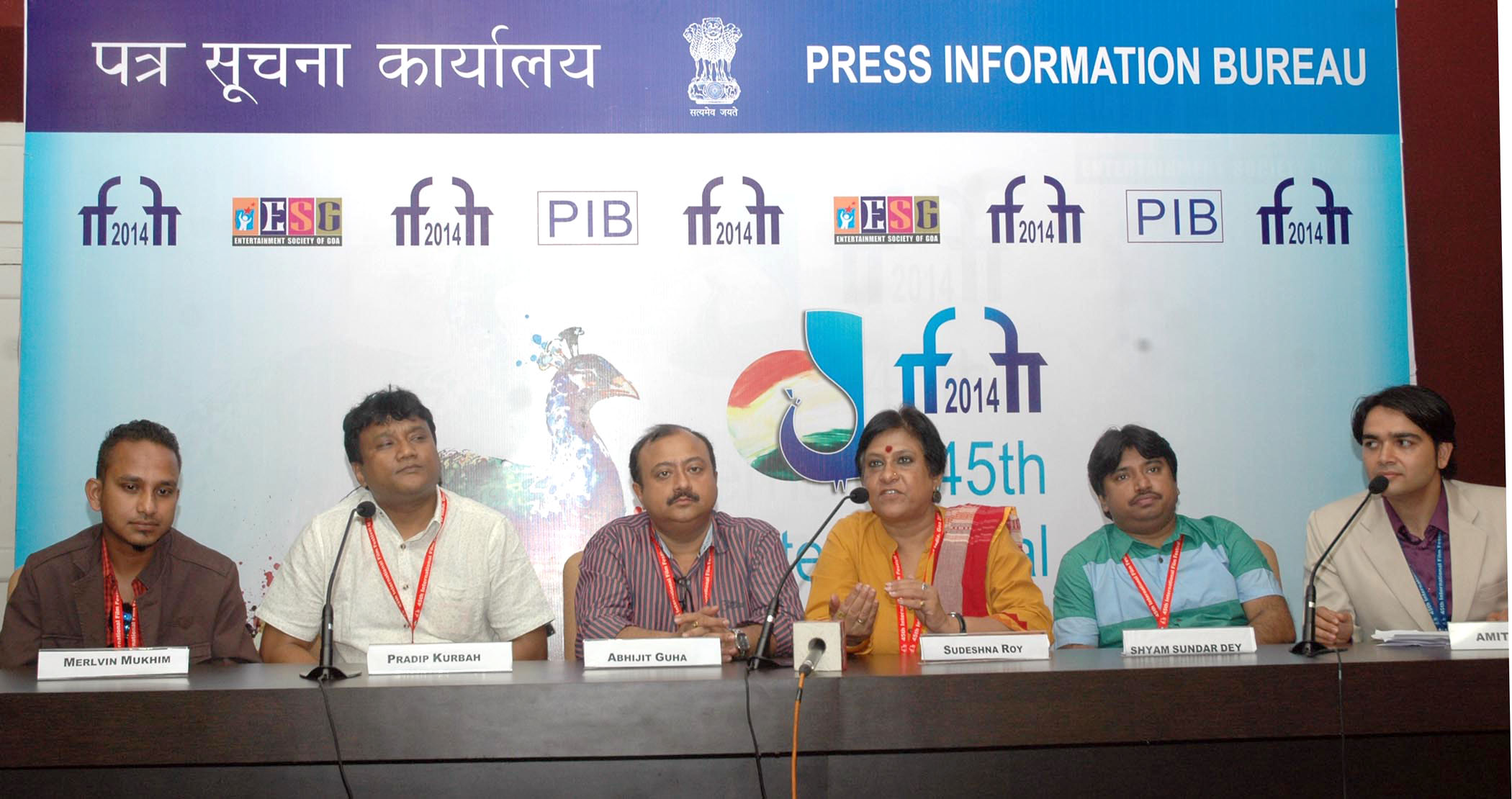
- Sudeshna Roy, IFFI, 2014
- Born: India
- Occupations: Film director; Actor; Writer
- Notable work: Teen Yaari Katha; Sraboner Dhara; Hercules
- Spouse: Saumitra Banerjee
- Children: Shaket Banerjee
- Relatives: Antara Mitra (Daughter-in-law)

Sudeshna Roy is an Indian film director, actor and writer based in the Bengali film industry. She started her career as an entertainment journalist before collaborating with Abhijit Guha as a directorial duo. The duo made their directorial debut with Shudhu Tumi and have since made films in different genres, particularly urban romantic comedies. Abir Chatterjee debuted in their directorial Cross Connection in 2009. They gained prominence after their critically acclaimed film Teen Yaari Katha. It was showcased at the Osian's Cinefan Festival of Asian and Arab Cinema in 2006 and it travelled to the Bangkok International Film as well as Kolkata International Film Festival. Their film Bapi Bari Jaa is considered as classic among the Bangla film lovers for its coming of age storyline and relatable characters. It marked the debut of Arjun Chakraborty and Mimi Chakraborty.

Their film Jodi Love Dilena Praane was another well received film and was selected in the Indian Panorama section of the International Film Festival of India in Goa in 2014. It was showcased at the Pune Film Festival in India, and won a certificate of appreciation at the Fiji International Film Festival in 2015.

Benche Thakar Gaan, directed by the duo, ran in theatres for nine weeks and was selected as the inaugural film for the Kolkata International Film Festival. This was the first time in history that a Bengali language film was given this honour. Their film Sraboner Dhara was a part of the Asian Select Competition Section KIFF 2019, Kolkata. It was showcased in Toronto at the IFFSA fest in May 2019.

== Films ==
Year	Film	Director	Story	Screenplay	Acting	Notes	Ref.
2004	Shudhu Tumi	Yes	Yes	Yes	Yes	Debut directorial film	
2009	Cross Connection	Yes	No	No	Yes		
2010	Prem By Chance	Yes	Yes	Yes	No		
2012	Teen Yaari Katha	Yes	Yes	Yes	No		
2012	Bapi Bari Jaa	Yes	Yes	No	No		
2014	Biye Notout	Yes	Yes	Yes	No		
2014	Jodi Love Dile Na Prane	Yes	No	No	No		
2014	Hercules	Yes	Yes	No	No		
2015	Ekla Cholo	Yes	Yes	Yes	No		
2015	Bitnoon	Yes	Yes	No	No		
2015	Jodi Bolo Hyan	Yes	Yes	No	No	Tele film for Zee Bangla	
2015	Ebhabeo Phire Asha Jay	Yes	Yes	No	No	Tele film for Zee Bangla	
2015	Mayer Biye	Yes	Yes	No	Yes		
2015	Cross Connection 2	Yes	Yes	No	Yes		
2016	Akash Choan	Yes	No	No	No	Tele film for Zee Bangla	
2016	Abar Ekla Cholo	Yes	Yes	No	No	Tele film for Zee Bangla	
2016	Bhenche Thakar Gaan	Yes	Yes	No	No		
2016	Sei Meyta	Yes	Yes	No	No	Tele film for Zee Bangla	
2017	Chalo Let's Live	Yes	Yes	No	No	Tele film for Zee Bangla	
2017	Dekh Kemon Lage	Yes	Yes	No	Yes		
2018	Jobor Dokhol	Yes	Yes	No	No	Tele film for Zee Bangla	
2018	Virgin Mohito	Yes	Yes	No	No	Web series on Addatimes	
2019	Samsara	Yes	No	No	No		
2020	Sudakshinar Saree	Yes	No	No	Yes	Tele film for Zee Bangla	
2020	Sraboner Dhara	Yes	No	No	Yes		
2020	Biye.com	Yes	No	No	No		
2021	Phire Dekha	Yes	Yes	No	Yes		
2021	Amra 2GayTher	Yes	Yes	No	No	Web series on Klikk	
2022	Hariye Jaowar Agey	Yes	Yes	Yes	Yes		
2023	Joy Kali Kalkattawali	Yes	Yes	No	No		
2023	Angshuman MBA	Yes	Yes	Yes	No		
2024	Shesh Rokkha	Yes	No	No	No	Tele film on Zee Bangla	
2025	Aapish	Yes	No	No	Yes		

== Television Series (As Director) ==
1. Labonyor Sansar
2. Khunje Berai Kachcher Maanush
3. Shashuri Zindabad
4. Taranath Tantrik
5. Kanakanjali
6. Manabi
7. Parama
8. Naari

=== Quiz Programmes ===
1. Sreemoti Budhdhimoti
2. Proshnokhetro
3. Checkmate

=== Children Programmes ===
1. Dekhbo Aami Jagat Take

== Soap opera ==
=== As an actress ===
- Robi Thakurer Golpo
- Deep Jwele Jaay
- Goyenda Ginni
- Sona Roder Gaan
- Maa Tomay Chara Ghum Asena as Jhilik's aunt
- Pratidaan as Mrs.Bhaduri
- Ekhane Aakash Neel Season 2 as Dr. Lily Dashgupta, Hiya's teacher
- Alo Chhaya as Anushree and Tanushree's mother
- Mithai as Mrs. Chatterjee, English tutor at Excel English Academy

== Personal life ==
Her son Shaket Banerjee is also a film maker. Her daughter-in-law is Antara Mitra, a well known content producer mainly associated with OTT platform addatimes.

== Other Important Works ==
Since 2017 she has been associated with the West Bengal Commission for Protection of Child Rights as a member, then a special consultant and then from 16 September 2022 she has been the Chairperson of the Commission.

== Awards & Recognitions ==
- Teen Yaari Katha was showcased in the competition section of Osian's Cinefan Festival of Asian and Arab Cinema in 2012. It travelled to the Bangkok International Film as well as Kolkata International Film Festival.
- Jodi Love Dile Na Prane was selected for Indian Panorama Film Festival in Goa in 2014. Official selection in Pune Film Festival and Hyderabad Film Festival. It won the Certificate of Appreciation at Fiji International Film Festival in 2015.
- Benche Thakar Gaan : The Song of Life was selected as the inaugural film for the Kolkata International Film Festival 2016.
- Sraboner Dhara is a part of the Asian Select Competition Section KIFF 2019, Kolkata. It was showcased in Toronto at the IFFSA fest in May, 2019.
