= List of Indian Bengali films of 2011 =

2011 Indian Bengali films

A list of films produced by the Tollywood (Bengali language film industry) based in Kolkata in 2011.

== January–March ==
Opening		Title	Director	Cast	Genre
J A N U A R Y	7	Apon Shatru	Susanta Saha	Indrajit, Angshuman, Arunima Ghosh	Drama
J A N U A R Y	7	Bedeni	Anjan Das	Rituparna Sengupta, Indraneil Sengupta, Rajesh Sharma	Drama
J A N U A R Y	14	Hello Memsaheb	Shiboprosad Mukherjee, Nandita Roy	Jeet, Priyanka Upendra	Drama
J A N U A R Y	14	Agnisakshi	Dipankar Bhattacharya	Devjit, Pamela, Soumili Biswas, Soumitra Chatterjee	Drama
J A N U A R Y	14	Egaro	Arun Roy	Hirak Das, Ronodeep Bose, Kharaj Mukerjee, Tamal Roy Choudhury, Sankar Chakrabarty, Nitya Ganguly, Bhaskar Bandopadhyay, Biswajit Chakrabarty, Tulika Basu	Drama
J A N U A R Y	14	Takhan Teish	Atanu Ghosh	Jisshu Sengupta, Paoli Dam, Aparajita Ghosh Das, Tanusree Shankar, Rajatabha Dutta, Biswajit Chakrabarty, Biplab Chatterjee, Neel Mukherjee, Locket Chatterjee, Indrani Haldar	Drama
J A N U A R Y	28	Bye Bye Bangkok	Aniket Chattopadhaya	Swastika Mukherjee, Silajit Majumder, Rudranil Ghosh, Kharaj Mukherjee, Anjana Basu, Locket Chatterjee, Sonali Choudhury, Kanchan Mallik, Kanchana Maitra, Neel Mukherjee, Rajatava Dutta, Biswajit Chakrabarty, Phalguni Chatterjee, Kunal Padhi	Comedy
J A N U A R Y	28	Bangla Bachao	Anup Sengupta	Prosenjit Chatterjee, Paoli Dam, Parno Mittra	Drama
J A N U A R Y	28	Teen Tanaya	Shukla Mitra	Saheb Chattopadhyay, Rupanjana Mitra, Soumili Biswas, Bhaswar Chatterjee, Sudipta Chatterjee, Debottam	Drama
F E B R U A R Y	4	Kagojer Bou	Bappaditya Bandopadhyay	Paoli Dam, Rahul Banerjee	Drama
F E B R U A R Y	4	Necklace	Shekhar Das	Rituparna Sengupta, Locket Chatterjee, Rudranil Ghosh, Ritwik Chakraborty, Chandreyee Ghose, Deepankar De, Biplab Chatterjee, Biswajit Chakraborty	Drama
F E B R U A R Y	4	Bhoy	Subhendu Ghosh	Amitava Bhattacharya, Manami Ghosh, Biplab Chattopadhyay, Satabdi Roy, Abhishek Chatterjee	Drama
F E B R U A R Y	11	Paapi	Aziz Sajwal	Prosenjit Chatterjee, Arya Babbar, Sayantika Banerjee, Rajesh Sharma	Drama
F E B R U A R Y	11	Jiyo Kaka	Parambrata Chatterjee	Rituparna Sengupta, Rahul, Rudranil Ghosh, Abhiraj, Silajit Majumder, Kanchan Mallik	Comedy
F E B R U A R Y	11	Fight 1:1	Debaditya	Satabdi Roy, Raja, Mouli, Pamela, Raj, Moumita	Drama
F E B R U A R Y	11	Ohh My Love	Partho Sarathi Joarder	-	Romance
F E B R U A R Y	18	Piriti Kathaler Aatha	Reshmi Mitra	Sourov, Ridhima Ghosh, Biplab Chatterjee	Romance
F E B R U A R Y	18	Tupi Diye Topor	Swapan Ghosal	Wrick, Sarbani, Tamal Ray Choudhury, Pushpita Mukherjee, Joy	Romance
F E B R U A R Y	25	Janala	Buddhadeb Dasgupta	Indraneil Sengupta, Swastika Mukherjee	Drama
F E B R U A R Y	25	Aami Adu	Somnath Gupta	Soumitra Chatterjee, Rudranil Ghosh, Debolina, Samadarshi	Drama
F E B R U A R Y	25	Handcuff	Sanat Dutta	Rituparna Sengupta, Samir, Aftab, Samrat Mukherjee	Drama
F E B R U A R Y	25	Abhisandhi	Tarun Chattopadhya	Rituparna Sengupta, Mukul Dev, Kalyan Ray, Barun Chanda, Sreela Majumdar, Nimu Bhoumick, Sanjay Swaaraj, Chidananda Dasgupta (Special Appearance)	Drama
M A R C H	4	Cholo Paltai	Haranath Chakraborty	Prosenjit Chatterjee, Mouli Ganguly, Devdaan Bhowmik, Tathoi Deb	Drama
M A R C H	4	Superstar - A Love Story	James Anthony	Joy, Pamela	Romance
M A R C H	4	Punorutthan	Rishi Mukherjee	Priyanshu Chatterjee, Rituparna Sengupta, Victor Banerjee, Sabyasachi Chakrabarty, Reema Lagoo	Drama
M A R C H	4	Ekdin Thik	Nirmalya Banerjee	Debashree Roy, Dhritiman Chatterjee, Paran Bandopadhyay	Drama
M A R C H	11	Street Light	Animesh Roy	Abhishek Chatterjee, Arjun Chakraborty, Sreelekha Mitra, Locket Chatterjee, Nivedita, Pulakita Ghosh	Drama
M A R C H	11	Ei Aranya	-	Firdaus, Debashree Roy, Abhishek Chatterjee, Rajatava Dutt	Drama
M A R C H	18	Mon Bole Priya Priya	Milan Bhowmik	Raj, Pamela, Ashish Vidyarthi, Tapas Paul, Subhasish Mukherjee, Rita Koyral	Romance

== April–June ==
Opening		Title	Director	Cast	Genre
A P R	1	Bajikar	Prodyut Bhattacharya	Rohan, Pamela, Rajatava Dutt, Rama Prasad Banik, Kharaj Mukherjee, Parthasarathi Dev	Drama
A P R	1	Run	Swapan Saha	Rahul, Priyanka	Drama
A P R	1	Love Birds - The Symbol of Love	S.K.	Subho, Arunima Ghosh, Sabyasachi Chakrabarty, Aditi Sinha, Supriya Devi, Dulal Lahiri, Sumit Ganguly, Master Arya, Ashoke Mukherjee, Jagannath Patra, Bhola Tamang, Praloy, Partho, Jhoni, Kunaljit, Arpita, Govindo, Polomy, Sunita, Indrani, Raju, Sudipta, Tapan Bharadwaj	Romance
A P R	8	Private Practice	Panna Hossain	Jagannath Patra, Pasha, Aishwarya, Ratri, Mrinal Mukherjee, Ramaprasad Banik, Manasi Sinha, Sunil Mukherjee	Romance
A P R	8	Jibon Rong Berong	Sanghamitra Chaudhuri	Chiranjit, Debashree Roy, Soham, Swarnakamal, Soumitra Chatterjee	Drama
A P R	8	Cholte Cholte	Jagannath Patra	Subham Singh, Dulofar Khan, Ranjit, Navin Nishchol	Adventure
A P R	15	Baaz	-	Anshuman, Sneha, Jagannath Patra	Drama
A P R	15	Love Me	Ashish Roy -	Nabin, Chandrika, Shangkalita, Sandip, Papiya Adhikary -	Romance
A P R	22	Bhorer Alo	Prabhat Roy	Rituparna Sengupta, Rohit Roy, Priyanshu Chatterjee, Anusmriti Sarkar	Drama
A P R	29	Duti Mon	Subhash Sen	Ranjit Mallick, Rohit, Moyuri, Indrani	Drama
M A Y	6	Ogo Bideshini	-	Abhishek Chatterjee, Locket Chatterjee, Sohini Paul, Tapas Paul	Drama
M A Y	6	Bidehir Khonje Rabindranath	Sanghamitra Chaudhuri	Abhishek Chatterjee, Arpita Mukherjee, Angshuman, Souradeep, Sangita -	Drama
M A Y	18	Chatrak	Vimukthi Jayasundara	Paoli Dam, Sudeep Mukherji	Drama
M A Y	20	Nouka Dubi	Rituparno Ghosh	Raima Sen, Riya Sen, Jisshu Sengupta, Priyanshu Chatterjee, Sharmila Tagore	Drama
M A Y	20	Ek Poloke Ektu Dekha	Supriyo Sinha	Angshuman, Kasturi	Romance
M A Y	20	Aat Paake Bandha	Kunal Choudhury and Ruby Gupta	Abhishek Chatterjee, Biplab Chatterjee, Arpita Baker, Ruhi, Chaitali Dasgupta, Dipannita, Vishaal	Romance
J U N E	3				
J U N E	3	Fighter	Ravi Kinagi	Jeet, Srabanti, Ferdous Ahmed, Locket Chatterjee	Action
J U N E	3	Paglu	Rajeeb	Dev, Koel, Rajatava Dutta	Romance
J U N E	24	Ranjana Ami Ar Ashbona	Anjan Dutt	Anjan Dutt, Parno Mittra, Kabir Suman, Kanchan Mullick	Musical
J U N E	24	Amio Nebo Challenge	-	-	-
J U N E	30	Bindas Prem	Partha Sarkar	Mainak, Megha, Rajesh Sharma	Romance

== July–September ==
Opening		Title	Director	Cast	Genre
J U L Y	8	Achena Prem	Swapan Saha	Aakash, Barsha, Mou Saha, Anuradha Ray	Romance
J U L Y	15	Icche	Nandita Roy & Shibaprasad Mukherjee	Sohini Sengupta, Samadarshi Dutta, Bratya Basu, Ruplekha Mitra, Bidita Bag	Drama
J U L Y	22	Tomake Chai	-	-	Romance
J U L Y	29	Iti Mrinalini	Aparna Sen	Konkona Sen Sharma, Aparna Sen, Rajat Kapoor, Priyanshu Chatterjee, Kaushik Sen, Srijit Mukherji, Ananya Chatterjee, Locket Chatterjee, Shaheb Bhattacharjee, Suzanne Bernert, Gargi Roychowdhury, Dulal Lahiri, Rita Koiral	Drama
J U L Y	29	System	Riingo	Indraneil Sengupta, Subhra Kundu, Sabyasachi Chakrabarty, Rajesh Sharma, Barun Chanda, Indrajit, Kaushik Ganguly	Thriller
A U G U S T	12	Ami Shubhash Bolchi	Mahesh Manjrekar	Mithun Chakrabarty, Saheb, Barkha Bisht	Drama
A U G U S T	12	Uro Chithi	Kamaleshwar Mukherjee	Indraneil Sengupta, Sreelekha Mitra, Tanusree, Rudranil Ghosh	Drama
A U G U S T	12	Get Together	Arindom Chakrabarty	Rahul	
A U G U S T	12	Ajob Prem Ebong	Arindom Dey	Rahul, Paoli Dam	Romance
A U G U S T	26	Chaplin	Anindo Bandopadhyay	Rudranil Ghosh, Rachita Bhattacharya, Mir	Drama
A U G U S T	26	Seven Days	Tathagata Bhattacharjee	Saheb Chatterjee, Moubani Sarkar, Sreelekha Mitra, Subhasish Mukherjee, Dipankar Dey	Thriller
A U G U S T	31	Tomae Bhalobashi	Sujit Guha	Kunal, Jhilik, Shakti Kapoor, Bharat Kaul	Romance
S E P T E M B E R	9	Rang Milanti	Kaushik Ganguly	Saswata Chatterjee, Churni Ganguly, Ridhima Ghosh, Gaurav Chakrabarty, Indrasish Roy, Gourab Chatterjee	Romance, Comedy
S E P T E M B E R	16	Someday Somewhere - Jete Pari Chole	Sanghamitra Choudhuri	Paoli Dam, Saheb Bhattacharya, Shankar Chakravarty, Debjani Chatterjee, Biswajit Chakravarty, Soma Chakravarty, Souradeep Ghosh, Trishna Mukherjee	Romance
S E P T E M B E R	16	Bhool Bhal	Susanta Saha	Susanta Saha, Angshuman Gupta, Aparupa, Prince, Sucheta Nath	Comedy
S E P T E M B E R	23	Keloda In Kashmir	Sanghamitra Choudhuri	Bhola Tamang, Sangita Sonali, Priyanka Banerjee, Souradeep Ghosh, Raj Sinha, Abhinandan Dutta, Madhumita Ghosh, Shankar Chakraborty, Pallabi Chatterjee, Joyjit Banerjee	Comedy
S E P T E M B E R	30	Baishe Srabon	Srijit Mukherji	Prosenjit Chatterjee, Parambrata Chatterjee, Raima Sen, Abir Chatterjee, Gautam Ghose	Thriller
S E P T E M B E R	30	Shotru	Raj Chakraborty	Jeet, Nusrat Jahan	Comedy
S E P T E M B E R	30	Faande Poriya Boga Kaande Re	Soumik Chatterjee	Srabanti, Sohom	Comedy / Romance
S E P T E M B E R	30	Warrant - The Mission	Swaroop Ghosh	Joy Mukherjee, Priyanka, Biswajit Chakraborty, Anamika Saha	Action

== October–December ==
Opening		Title	Director	Cast	Genre
O C T O B E R	14	Mone Mone Bhalobasha	D. Mukherjee	Joy Mukherjee, Arunima Ghosh, Sabyasachi Mukherjee	Romance
O C T O B E R	21	Moubone Aaj	Raja Sen	Rahul, Priyanka, Ranjit Mallick	Drama
N O V E M B E R	4	Romeo	Sujit Mondal	Dev, Subhashree Ganguly	Romance
N O V E M B E R	11	Best Friend	Swapan Saha	Mainak, Biswajit, Sujoy, Priyanka	Romance
N O V E M B E R	18	Premer Katha Koli	Alok Roy	Arjun Chakraborty, Dolon Ray, Pallabi Chattopadhyay, Shantilal Mukhopadhyay, Dron Mukherjee	Romance
N O V E M B E R	25	Jaani Dyakha Hawbe	Birsa Dasgupta	Anjan Dutt, Mamata Shankar, Roopa Ganguly, Parambrata, Payel Sarkar	Romance
D E C E M B E R	2	Katakuti	Premangshu	Rahul, Sreelekha Mitra, Jaya Seal Ghosh, Silajit Majumdar, Krishnakishore, Kharaj Mukherjee	Drama
D E C E M B E R	2	Trishanku	Basu Chatterjee	Aviraj, Moubani	Drama
D E C E M B E R	9				
D E C E M B E R	9	Gosainbaganer Bhoot	Nitish Roy	Tojo, Antony, Victor Banerjee, Tinu Anand, Ashish Vidyarthi, Paran Bandyopadhay, Kanchan Mallick	Children
D E C E M B E R	9	Murder	Prakash Jaiswaal	Rituparna Sengupta, Indrajeet, Amitabha Bhattacharjee	Thriller
D E C E M B E R	9	Mone Pore Ajo Sei Din	Sudipto Ghatak, Ajay Singh	Joy, Sayantika, Aviraj	Romance
D E C E M B E R	16				
D E C E M B E R	16	Tenida	Chinmoy Roy	Subhasish Mukhopadhyay, Gaurav Das Gupta, Moinak Dutta, Ritam Bose, Sreemonti	Comedy
D E C E M B E R	16	Bhorer Pakhi	Tapan Dutta	Amitava Bhattacharya, Sreelekha Mitra, Rajatava Dutta, Manoj Mitra, Monu Mukhopadhyay, Nimu Bhowmik, Debika Mukhopadhyay, Mrinal Mukherjee, Sumit Gangopadhyay, Shankar Chakraborty	Drama
D E C E M B E R	23				
D E C E M B E R	23	Royal Bengal Rahashya	Sandip Ray	Sabyasachi Chakrabarty, Bibhu Bhattacharjee, Saheb Bhattacharya	Thriller
D E C E M B E R	23	Aami Montri Hobo	Partha Chakraborty	Kharaj Mukherjee, Manasi Sinha, Dulal Lahiri, Shakuntala Barua	Drama
