= List of Indian Bengali films of 2018 =

This is a list of Bengali language films that are scheduled to be released in 2018

== January–March ==
Opening		Title	Director	Cast	Production company	Ref.
J A N U A R Y	5	Boxer	Sanjay Bardhan	Shikhar Srivastava, Ena Saha, Soumitra Chatterjee, Rajatava Dutta, Laboni Sarkar	New Era Entertainment	
J A N U A R Y	5	Ray	Riingo Banerjee	Saswata Chatterjee, Kaushik Chakraborty, Tina Mukherjee	Winds of Autumn Motion Pictures	
J A N U A R Y	6	Jole Jongole	Nitish Roy	Mithun Chakraborty, Jackie Shroff, Tinnu Anand		
J A N U A R Y	12	Wrong Route	Indrajeet Chakraborty	Rahul Mazumdar, Prity Biswas, Kharaj Mukherjee	B R Production	
J A N U A R Y	19	Aschhe Abar Shabor	Arindam Sil	Saswata Chatterjee, Subhrajit Dutta, Gaurav Chakrabarty, Indraneil Sengupta, Lolita Chatterjee, Mir Afsar Ali, Darshana Banik	SVF Entertainment	
J A N U A R Y	19	Total Dadagiri	Pathikrit Basu	Yash Dasgupta, Mimi Chakraborty	SVF Entertainment	
J A N U A R Y	19	Inspector Notty K	Ashok Pati	Jeet, Nusrat Faria Mazhar	Jeetz Filmworks, Walzen Media Works, Surinder Films (Note: Indo Bangladesh joint production with Jaaz Multimedia)	
J A N U A R Y	25	Jonaki	Aditya Vikram Sengupta	Lolita Chatterjee, Burjor Patel, Jim Sarbh, Ratnabali Bhattacharya, Sumanto Chattopadhyay, Indrajeet Sinha, Arunima Sinha	Magic Hour Films	
F E B R U A R Y	9	Nilacholey Kiriti	Anindya Bikash Dutta	Indraneil Sengupta, Rituparna Sengupta, Arunima Ghosh, Samadarshi Dutta	Camellia Films Pvt Ltd	
F E B R U A R Y	9	Bhalobashar Bari	Tarun Majumder	Rituparna Sengupta, Dwijen Bandopadhyay	M. K. Media Pvt Ltd	
F E B R U A R Y	9	Michael	Satrajit Sen	Mir Afsar Ali, Tonushree Chakraborty, Swastika Mukherjee, Sayani Dutta, Arunima Ghosh, Soumitra Chattopadhyay, Soumyajit Majumdar, Payel Mukherjee, Kanchan Mallick	Greentouch Entertainment Pvt Ltd & Tripod Entertainment Pvt Ltd	
F E B R U A R Y	16	Noor Jahaan	Abhimanyu Mukherjee	Adrit Roy, Puja Cherry Roy	Raj Chakraborty Production, SVF Entertainment	
M A R C H	9	Ka Kha Ga Gha	Dr. Krishnedu Chatterjee	Paran Bandopadhyay, Kaushik Ganguly	Krishna Movies	
M A R C H	23	Rongberonger Korhi	Ranjan Ghosh	Rituparna Sengupta, Chiranjeet Chakraborty	Camellia Productions	
M A R C H	23	Raja Rani Raji	Rajiv Kumar Biswas	Bonny Sengupta, Rittika Sen	Shree Venkatesh Films	
M A R C H	30	Alifa	Deep Choudhury	Baharul Islam, Jaya Seal		
M A R C H	30	Ghare & Baire	Mainak Bhoumik	Jisshu Sengupta, Koel Mallick		

== April–June ==
Opening		Title	Director	Cast	Production company	Ref.
A P R I L	13	Aami Ashbo Phirey	Anjan Dutt	Anjan Dutt, Swastika Mukherjee, Darshana Banik, Sauraseni Mitra, Anindya Chatterjee, Anjana Basu	SVF Entertainment	
A P R I L	13	Kabir	Aniket Chattopadhyay	Dev, Rukmini Maitra, Priyanka Sarkar	Dev Entertainment Ventures Pvt Ltd	
A P R I L	20	Alinagarer Golokdhadha	Sayantan Ghosal	Anirban Bhattacharya, Kaushik Sen, Parno Mitra		
A P R I L	20	Chalbaaz	Joydip Mukherjee	Shakib Khan, Subhashree Ganguly		
A P R I L	27	Guptodhoner Sandhane	Dhrubo Banerjee	Abir Chatterjee, Arjun Chakraborty. Ishaa Saha, Rajatava Dutta, Arindam Sil, Kamaleshwar Mukherjee	Shree Venkatesh Films	
A P R I L	27	Drishtikone	Kaushik Ganguly	Prosenjit Chatterjee, Rituparna Sengupta	Surinder Films	
M A Y	11	Haami	Shiboprosad Mukherjee, Nandita Roy	Shiboprosad Mukherjee, Gargee RoyChowdhury, Tanusree Shankar, Churni Ganguly	Windows Productions	
M A Y	18	Sesh Chithi	Tanmoy Roy	Soumitra Chatterjee, Lily Chakraborty		
M A Y	25	Rainbow Jelly	Soukarya Ghosal	Mahabrata Basu, Anumegha Banerjee, Kaushik Sen, Sreelekha Mitra, Shantilal Mukherjee	Indigenous Production	
J U N E	1	Uma	Srijit Mukherjee	Jisshu U Sengupta, Sara Sengupta, Anjan Dutt, Srabanti, Rudranil Ghosh, Sayantika	SVF Entertainment	
J U N E	15	Bhaijaan Elo Re	Joydip Mukherjee	Shakib Khan, Srabanti Chatterjee		
J U N E	15	Sultan: The Saviour	Raja Chanda	Jeet, Priyanka Sarkar		
J U N E	22	Ahare Mon	Pratim D. Gupta	Adil Hussain, Ritwick Chakraborty		

== July–September ==
Opening		Title	Director	Cast	Production company	Ref.
J U L Y	6	Shonar Pahar	Parambrata Chatterjee	Jisshu U Sengupta, Parambrata Chatterjee, Tanuja Mukherjee, Arunima Ghosh, Srijato Bandyopadhyay (child artiste)	Greentouch Entertainment	
J U L Y	13	Maati	Saibal Banerjee Leena Gangopadhyay	Adil Hussain, Paoli Dam, Shankar Chakroborty, Laboni Sarkar, Chandan Sen, Aporajita Addhya, Monami Ghosh, Anoshua Majumder, Rishi Koushik, Sabitri Chatterjee	Magic Moments Motion Pictures	
J U L Y	13	Fidaa	Pathikrit Basu	Yash Dasgupta, Sanjana Banerjee		
J U L Y	13	Abar Basanta Bilap	Rajesh Dutta, Ipsita Roy Sarkar	Moonmoon Sen, Kharaj Mukherjee, Sumit Samaddar, and Mir Afsar Ali, Mousumi Saha and others	Chhandasi Creations	
J U L Y	18	Reunion	Murari Mohan Rakshit	Parambrata Chatterjee, Raima Sen		
J U L Y	20	Biday Byomkesh	Debaloy Bhattacharya	Abir Chatterjee, Sohini Sarkar		
J U L Y	27	Oskar	Partha Sarathi Manna	Aparajita Adhya, Kharaj Mukherjee, Saheb Bhattacharya, Priyanshu Chatterjee, Satyahari Mondal, Ayoshi Talukdar	Shreyant Films	
A U G U S T	10	Crisscross	Birsa Dasgupta	Nusrat Jahan, Mimi Chakraborty, Jaya Ahsan, Sohini Sarkar, Ridhima Ghosh Chakrabarty, Arjun Chakrabarty & Gaurav Chakrabarty		
A U G U S T	24	Tuski	Aniket Chattopadhyay	Kharaj Mukherjee, Rajesh Sharma, Anamika Saha		
A U G U S T	31	Nirbhoya	Milan Bhowmik	Raaj Bhowmik, Meghali		
S E P T E M B E R	21	Naqaab	Rajiv Kumar Biswas	Shakib Khan, Nusrat Jahan		

== October–December ==
Opening		Title	Director	Cast	Production company	Ref.
O C T O B E R	8	AranyaDeb	Debasish Sen Sharma	Jisshu Sengupta, Mir Afsar Ali, Sreelekha Mitra		
O C T O B E R	12	Kishore Kumar Junior	Kaushik Ganguly	Prasenjit Chatterjee, Aparajita Auddy, Ritabrata Banerjee	Camelia Production Pvt. Ltd	
O C T O B E R	12	Byomkesh Gotro	Arindam Sil	Abir Chatterjee, Rahul Banerjee, Sohini Sarkar, Priyanka Sarkar, Anjan Dutt, Arjun Chakraborty, Sauraseni Maitra, Arindam Sil	SVF Entertainment	
O C T O B E R	12	Ek Je Chhilo Raja	Srijit Mukherji	Jisshu U Sengupta, Joya Ahsan, Aparna Sen, Alexx O'Nell, Anjan Dutt, Anirban Bhattacharya, Jit Das	SVF Entertainment	
O C T O B E R	12	Villain	Baba Yadav	Ankush Hazra, Mimi Chakraborty, Ritika Sen		
O C T O B E R	12	Manojder Adbhut Bari	Anindya Chattopadhyay	Soumitra Chatterjee, Sandhya Roy, Abir Chatterjee, Bratya Basu	Windows Production House	
O C T O B E R	12	Hoichoi Unlimited	Aniket Chattopadhyay	Dev, Koushani Mukherjee, Puja Banerjee, Roja Paromita Dey, Arna Mukhopadhyay, Kharaj Mukherjee, Saswata Chatterjee	Dev Entertainment Ventures	
N O V E M B E R	2	Girlfriend	Raja Chanda	Rahul Banerjee, Bonny Sengupta, Koushani Mukherjee		
N O V E M B E R	23	Generation Ami	Mainak Bhoumik	Rwitobroto Mukherjee, Sauraseni Maitra		
D E C E M B E R	21	Adventures of Jojo	Raj Chakraborty	Joshojit Banerjee, Rudranil Ghosh		
D E C E M B E R	21	Rosogolla	Pavel	Ujaan Ganguly, Abantika Biswas, Kharaj Mukherjee		
