= Premendu Bikash Chaki =

Indian film director and cinematographer

- Occupation: Cinematographer • Film Director • Screenwriter

Premendu Bikash Chaki popularly known as P. B. Chaki, is an Indian cinematographer, director and screenwriter associated with Tollywood (Bengali cinema) based in West Bengal, India. He started his career as cinematographer in 1990. Known for his films Chirodini Tumi Je Amar as cinematographer and Alaap as writer and director. He also has held several positions in the film fraternity, including being the former president of Eastern India Cinematographers' Association and vice president in the technical committee of Kolkata International Film Festival besides being a guest lecturer of film studies at the Information and Cultural Affairs Department, Government of West Bengal.

== Early life ==
Premendu Bikash Chaki was born in Kolkata, India. He completed his school from Jodhpur Park Boys School and then went on to graduate with a B.Com. Honours degree from University of Calcutta. His passion for films led him to pursue further film studies at Chitrabani. He started his career as a photojournalist in 1985. He then went on to work as an assistant cinematographer until he started working independently as a cinematographer in the early 1990s. His first big recognition was after winning the Bengal Film Journalists' Association Awards for the film Mahulbonir Sereng (Bengali movie), directed by Sekhar Das in 2004. He directed his first reality TV show, Takkar, in 2009. He went on to release his first feature film, Honeymoon, in 2018 for the big screen.

== Filmography ==
=== As director ===
Year	Film	Role	Notes	Ref.
2018	Honeymoon	Director		
2021	Laptop – The Lockdown Film	Writer & Director	Short Film	
2021	Rayscope	Writer & Director	Documentary Film (Tribute to Satyajit Ray)	
2022	Paka Dekha	Director		
2023	Love Marriage	Director		
2023	Palasher Biye	Director	Distributed by ZEE5	
2024	Alaap	Writer & Director		

=== As cinematographer ===
Year	Film	Ref.
2004	Mahulbanir Sereng	
2005	Manik	
2005	Shubhodrishti	
2007	I Love You	
2007	Pitribhumi	
2008	Chirodini Tumi Je Amar	
2010	Handa and Bhonda	
2011	Bye Bye Bangkok	
2012	Koyekti Meyer Galpo	
2012	Balukabela.com	
2013	Kidnapper	
2013	Mahapurush O Kapurush	
2015	Room No. 103	
2016	Mahanayika	
2016	Banchha Elo Phire	
2017	Nimki Fulki	
2017	Dekh Kemon Lage	
2018	Naqaab	

== Awards ==
Year	Award	Category	Film	Result	Ref.
2013	Bengal Film Journalists' Association Awards	Best Cinematographer	Mayabazaar	Won	
