= Chha-e Chhuti =

- Directed by: Aniket Chattopadhyay
- Release date: 2009
- Country: India
- Language: Bengali

Chha-e Chhuti (2009) is an Indian Bengali Comedy drama film directed by Aniket Chattopadhyay.

== Plot ==
A technician's accidental death leads to a workers' union's strike for a week. Few television actors with their director go to a trip to an outcast sea side to spend the week. One senior artist Benu suggests the place, Mominpur with accommodation. While the team is staying there one short tempered actor Kunal slaps the caretaker Parash and he dies. All become confused for such a mishap and try to hide everything but the police suspect them all.

== Cast ==
(Note: All the actors of this film were playing the fictional version of themselves.)

- Sonali Chowdhury as Sonali
- Sabyasachi Chakraborty as Benuda
- Kunal Mitra as Kunal
- Kharaj Mukherjee as Kharaij
- Rudranil Ghosh as Rudra
- Anjana Basu as Anjana
- Shilajit Majumder as Shilajit
- Locket Chatterjee as Locket
- Dona Das as Dona
- Milon Roychoudhury as Milanda
- Gargi Banerjee
- Sushanta Banerjee
- Tanima Banerjee
- Animesh Bhaduri
- Ranit Bhargav
- Arindam Bhattacharya
