= Sonali Chowdhury =

Indian film and television actress

- Born: Kolkata, West Bengal, India
- Other names: Kuchu
- Occupation: Actress
- Spouse: Rajat Ghosh Dastidar
- Children: 1

Sonali Chowdhury Ghosh Dastidar is an Indian film and television actress. She is best remembered for her role as Aparna Debroy from Agnipariksha. She has also appeared in Bengali TV series as Saat Bhai Champa, Jol Nupur etc.

== Life ==
Choudhuri was born in Kolkata. She graduated from Calcutta University after attending Alipore Multipurpose Government Girls High School also in the Kolkata area.

== List of work ==
Key
†	Denotes films that have not yet been released

=== Films ===
Year	Title	Role	Note	Ref.
2000	Parichay			
2002	Shiba			
2003	K Apon K Por			
2004	Agni			
2004	Shakti			
2009	Chha-e Chhuti			
2010	Target			
2011	Bye Bye Bangkok	Pritha Sadhukhan		
2012	8:08 Er Bongaon Local			
2015	Amar Prithibi			
2019	Dotara			
2020	Bidrohini			
	Cut It †			
	Cornel †			

=== TV series ===
Year	Title	Role	Channel	Note	Ref.
2007	Khela		Zee Bangla		
2009-2013	Sholo Aana		Colors Bangla		
	Raja & Gaja		Zee Bangla		
2009	Agnipariksha		Zee Bangla		
2017	Saat Bhai Champa	Rani Padmavati	Zee Bangla		
2022	Bodhisattwar Bodhbuddhi		Zee Bangla		
2017-2018	Kundo Phooler Mala		Star Jalsha	Later replaced by Debolina Dutta	
2015-2017	Ichche Nodee		Star Jalsha		
2013-2015	Jol Nupur	Minu	Star Jalsha		
2009-2014	Maa....Tomay Chara Ghum Ashena		Star Jalsha		
	Kajol Bhromora				
	Haat Baralei Bondhu				
	Sholo Ana				
	Roilo Pherar Nimontron		Star Jalsha		
	Ki Ashay Badhi Khelaghar				
	Nir Bhanga Jhor				
	Ashambhab		Zee Bangla		
	Nijer Janye Shok		DD Bangla		
	Kone Bou	Tanvi			
	Bodhisattwer Bodhbuddhi				
	Mittir Bari	Tapati Mitra	Zee Bangla		
	O Mor Dorodiya		Star Jalsha		

=== Reality shows ===
Year	Title	Role	Channel
	Dance Bangla Dance	Judge	Zee Bangla
	Abbulish	Host	Colors Bangla
	Srimoti Champion	Host	Colors Bangla
	Dadagiri Unlimited Season 8 Grand Finale	Contestant as Helping hand for South 24 Parganas	Zee Bangla
	Didi No. 1 Season 5	Contestant	Zee Bangla
	Didi No. 1 Season 7	Contestant as Aparna of Agnipariksha	Zee Bangla
	Didi No. 1 Season 8	Contestant with her husband Rajat	Zee Bangla

== See also ==
- Anjana Basu
- Locket Chatterjee
- Kanchana Moitra
