= Room No. 103 =

2015 Indian Bengali film

- Directed by: Aniket Chattopadhyay
- Produced by: Kaustav Roy, RP Techvision India Pvt Ltd.
- Starring: Soumitra Chatterjee; Jisshu Sengupta; Priyanka Sarkar; Anjana Basu; Rudraprasad Sengupta; Kanchana Moitra
- Cinematography: Premendu Bikash Chaki
- Music by: Mayookh Bhaumik
- Release date: 15 May 2015
- Country: India
- Language: Bengali

Room No. 103 is a 2015 Indian Bengali-language drama film directed by Aniket Chattopadhyay and produced by Kaustav Roy. This film is a comedy with thriller elements.

== Plot ==
The story of the film revolves around a hotel named Raat Din. Rudra Chatterjee has been the manager of the hotel for 33 years. In these 33 years in the hotel he has gathered many experiences. He is narrating four stories in this film.

== Cast ==
- Soumitra Chatterjee as Rudra Chatterjee
- Jisshu Sengupta as Kaushik Ray, Renowned film director
- Anjana Basu as Dyotona Mukherjee
- Biplab Chatterjee as Dyotona's father
- Priyanka Sarkar as Kaushik Ray's biological daughter
- Rajesh Sharma as Tirtha Majumder, a contract killer
- Ankita Chakraborty as Madhabilata aka Lata
- Anindya Bose as Supratim Banerjee aka Rupam
- Kanchana Moitra as Riya
- Badshah Moitra as Imdadul Hock, Dyotona's love interest
- Rudraprasad Sengupta guest appearance

== See also ==
- Bye Bye Bangkok
