= NH6 =

NH6 can refer to:

- National Highway 6 (India)
  - National Highway 6 (India, old numbering) - NH6 under the old Indian numbering system
  - NH6 (web series), a 2023 Indian TV series
- National Highway 6 (Cambodia)

== See also ==
- List of highways numbered 6
