= Tuski =

2018 Indian Bengali film

- Directed by: Aniket Chattopadhyay
- Written by: Aniket Chattopadhyay
- Screenplay by: Aniket Chattopadhyay
- Produced by: Pradip Churiwal
- Starring: Kharaj Mukherjee; Kanchana Moitra; Anamika Saha; Rajesh Sharma
- Music by: Savvy Gupta
- Release date: 24 August 2018 (India)
- Country: India
- Language: Bengali

Tuski is a Bengali social drama film directed by Aniket Chattopadhyay and produced by Pradip Churiwal. This film was released on 24 August 2018 under the banner of Macneill Media Private Limited.

== Plot ==
This is a story of the disparity between two girls from a rich and a poor section of the society. Tuski, a poor girl was born unsung and lives in a family in a slum. She lost her mother just after her birth and was raised by her aunt Ranita. Tuski's father Subrata is an auto-rickshaw driver. For them struggle for survival is more valid than raising issues on morality. Ranita works as a household maid in the family of Tua, another child of Tuski’s age who lives in a high-rise beside the slum. While Tua and Tuski get friendly Tua’s mother becomes over-conscious about the difference in their social status. One day Ranita gets sacked from her job on the excuse of Tua picking up a foul word from Tuski, and out of rage against injustice and insult, Ranita gets Tuski admitted to the same English medium school where Tua’s mother wants her daughter to be in.

== Cast ==
- Kharaj Mukherjee as De souja
- Rajesh Sharma as Tuski's father
- Anamika Saha
- Priyanka Dutta as Tuski
- Moumi Basu as Tua
- Kanchana Moitra as Ranita
- Poulomi Basu
- Pradip Mukhopadhyay
- Krishnokishor Mukherjee
