= Pratyabartan =

2026 Bengali-language drama film

- Theatrical release poster
- Bengali: প্রত্যাবর্তন
- Literally: Return
- Directed by: Samarpan Sengupta
- Screenplay by: Samarpan Sengupta; Anirban Ghosal; Abhijit Chatterjee
- Story by: Samarpan Sengupta
- Produced by: Abhijit Chatterjee
- Starring: Anjan Dutt; Roopa Ganguly; Silajit Majumder; Aparajita Adhya; Kharaj Mukherjee
- Cinematography: Gopi Bhagat
- Edited by: Subhajit Singha
- Music by: Bonnie Chakraborty; Silajit Majumder; Gourab Tapadar; Abhijit Chatterjee
- Production company: Sree Abhigyan Dreamworks Pvt. Ltd.
- Release date: 1 May 2026
- Running time: 133 minutes
- Country: India
- Language: Bengali

Pratyabartan (Bengali: প্রত্যাবর্তন, lit. 'Return') is a 2026 Indian Bengali-language drama film written and directed by Samarpan Sengupta. Produced by Abhijit Chatterjee under Sree Abhigyan Dreamworks Pvt. Ltd., the film stars Anjan Dutt, Roopa Ganguly, Silajit Majumder, Aparajita Adhya and Kharaj Mukherjee in lead roles.

The film deals with urban ambition, family disconnection, social media dependence and the emotional loneliness of a teenage girl within a professionally successful household. It was certified UA 13+ by the Central Board of Film Certification on 28 April 2026 and released theatrically on 1 May 2026.

== Premise ==
Dr Dipankar Sanyal, a successful surgeon from rural Purulia, leaves his roots behind and moves to Kolkata with his wife Shalini and their daughter Disha in pursuit of professional success and a better future. Over time, social status, ambition and city life begin to weaken the family's emotional bonds. Feeling isolated, Disha turns to social media for identity and validation, leading to a crisis that forces her parents to confront their failures and return to their roots.

== Cast ==
- Anjan Dutt
- Roopa Ganguly
- Silajit Majumder as Dr Dipankar Sanyal
- Aparajita Adhya as Shalini
- Avipsa "Mishtu" Chatterjee as Disha
- Kharaj Mukherjee
- Koneenica Banerjee
- Debranjan Nag
- Arunava Khasnabis
- Gaurav Tapadar
- Dipanjan Ghosh / RJ Deep

== Production ==
Pratyabartan was written and directed by Samarpan Sengupta. The Central Board of Film Certification credits the screenplay to Sengupta, Anirban Ghosal and Abhijit Chatterjee, with cinematography by Gopi Bhagat, editing by Subhajit Singha and music by Bonnie Chakraborty. The film was produced by Abhijit Chatterjee under Sree Abhigyan Dreamworks Pvt. Ltd.

Pre-release coverage highlighted the casting of Anjan Dutt and Roopa Ganguly together in the film. Reports also described the film as a story about urban life, the pressure of success and the emotional consequences of social media dependence.

In an interview with Indulge Express, Anjan Dutt said that he plays a retired school teacher in the film and spoke about working with Sengupta on the project.

== Release ==
The official poster of Pratyabartan was reported by The Times of India in April 2026. The film was certified UA 13+ by the Central Board of Film Certification on 28 April 2026 with a certified length of 133.31 minutes. It was released theatrically in Bengali on 1 May 2026.

Around the time of release, The Times of India reported discussion about the film's title and timing because actor Roopa Ganguly was also active in politics. Sengupta said that the film had no political connection and that the title was relevant to the story. The film had a premiere in May 2026, covered by Indulge Express.

== Reception ==
Poorna Banerjee of The Times of India rated the film 3 out of 5 stars. The review described the film as a family drama lifted by strong performances, particularly mentioning Aparajita Adhya and Avipsa "Mishtu" Chatterjee, while criticising the film's rushed subplots, stretched editing and underdeveloped ending.

Swati Chattopadhyay Bhowmik of Sangbad Pratidin wrote that the film addresses a contemporary issue through the loneliness of children and teenagers and their dependence on social media. The review praised the performances, especially that of Avipsa Chatterjee, but criticised aspects of the writing, characterisation and second half, saying that the subject was strong but the story and screenplay weakened the film's impact.
