= Aakhir Palaayan Kab Tak =

2024 Hindi film

- Directed by: Mukul Vikram
- Written by: Mukul Vikram
- Produced by: Sohani Kumari; Alka Choudhary
- Starring: Rajesh Sharma; Bhushan Patiyal; Chittaranjan Giri; Gaurav Sharma; Dheerendra Dwivedi
- Cinematography: M Ravichandran Thevar
- Edited by: Gurpreet Grewal
- Music by: J D Singh
- Release date: 16 February 2024
- Country: India
- Language: Hindi
- Box office: ₹10.36 crore

Aakhir Palaayan Kab Tak is a 2024 Hindi drama film that was released on 16 February 2024. Directed and written by Mukul Vikram, the movie takes the audience on a journey through the life of a police officer who becomes the central figure in a tale of personal challenges and unraveling a complex web of lies in a seemingly peaceful town. Suraj Singh Mas was the casting director of the movie and also acted in it.

== Plot ==
The storyline delves into the life of a dedicated police officer facing personal struggles while attempting to navigate a web of deceit within a tranquil town. The narrative unfolds the influence of dark forces exploiting community sentiments, weaving a captivating tale intricately connected to religious beliefs and communal issues. At the heart of the movie lies the leader's motivations, driven by an insatiable desire for property, thereby exploring themes of community manipulation and personal redemption.

== Release ==
The film was distributed by Cinepolis India. The released was for 16 February 2024 across India.

== Cast ==
- Bhushan Patiyal
- Rajesh Sharma (actor)
- Gaurav Sharma
- Chittaranjan Giri
- Dheerendra Dwivedi
- Sohani Kumari
- Saurabh Agnihotri
- Brijesh Karanwal
