= Hanuman.com =

2013 Bengali action thriller film by Gaurabh Pandey

- Directed by: Gaurav Pandey
- Written by: Gaurav Pandey
- Screenplay by: Prosenjit Chatterjee; Gaurav Pandey
- Produced by: Namit Bajoria
- Starring: Prosenjit Chatterjee; Mousumi Bhattacharya; Saskia Ranwig; Rudranil Ghosh; Kaushik Sen; Kharaj Mukherjee; Saloni Pandey; Gaurav Pandey
- Cinematography: Oliver Koeppel
- Edited by: Sanjib Dutta
- Music by: Indraadip Dasgupta
- Production company: Cinenine
- Distributed by: Shree Venkatesh Films
- Release date: 6 December 2013
- Running time: 110 mins
- Country: India
- Language: Bengali

Hanuman.com is a 2013 Indian Bengali-language action thriller film written and directed by Gaurabh Pandey. Produced by Namit Bajoria under the banner of Cinenine, it stars Prosenjit Chatterjee, Saskia Ranwig and Mousumi Bhattacharya in lead roles, with Kaushik Sen, Rudranil Ghosh and Kharaj Mukherjee in guest appearances. The film was released on 6 December 2013.

== Plot ==
Anjani Putra Sensharma (Prosenjit Chatterjee) is a school teacher in a small village named Basirhat in West Bengal. He lives with his wife Tanushree (Mousumi Bhattacharya) and his old moped. Under a school grant, Anjani Putra and the other teachers are given a desktop computer for home use. On the computer, he makes a friend named Maria Fischer (Saskia Ranwig) who claims to be from Reykjavik in Iceland. When Anjani Putra witnesses her to be murdered by a masked man on webcam, he succumbs to a psychological shock. Determined to find out her murderer he takes a flight to Iceland selling his ancestral land. Soon being befuddled in a foreign country he finds rescue in the Bangladeshi family of Hassan (Gaurav Pandey) settled there. A father-daughter like relation grows between Anjani Putra and Hassan's daughter Nuri (Saloni Pandey). Eventually, he finds out that the address given by Maria is false. Nonetheless, Nuri hacks into Maria's computer and finds out that her murderer is actually the local mayor (Oli Bigalke) who moonlights as a sociopathic rapist. Nuri sends him several emails tricking him to believe that Maria is actually alive. Then she steals a gun from her father's closet and persuades Anjani Putra to confront the murderer. Although initially frightened and reluctant, Anjani Putra finally guns the murderer down when he attempts to assault a decoy of Maria. Maria's dead body is soon found in a lake in Munich, Germany and Anjani Putra becomes headline in several international newspaper. Finally AnjaniPutra returns home to a tearful Tanushree and the film concludes.

== Cast ==
- Prosenjit Chatterjee as AnjaniPutra
- Mousumi Bhattacharya as Tanushree
- Saloni Pandey as Nuri
- Gaurabh Pandey as Hassan
- Rudranil Ghosh as cableman Panchu
- Kaushik Sen as Geography teacher
- Kharaj Mukherjee as Police Inspector
- Saskia Ranwig as Maria Fischer
- Oli Bigalke as a Mayor
- Þórunn Guðlaugsdóttir as Wife of Hassan

== Soundtrack ==
All music is composed by Indraadip Dasgupta.

No.	Title	Lyrics	Singer(s)	Length
1.	"Chal Chal Chal"	Gaurav Pandey	Arijit Singh
2.	"Prithibita Naki"			3:06
3.	"Je Chilo Amar Swapanocharini"			3:51
4.	"Ikir Mikir"			1:41
