= Y2K (Athoba, 'Sex Krome Aasitechhe') =

- Directed by: Chandril Bhattacharya
- Written by: Chandril Bhattacharya
- Starring: Mrinmoy Nandi; Sreelekha Mitra; Silajit Majumder; Gargi Roychowdhury; Rajatava Dutta; Chirantan Dasgupta; Miss Jojo
- Cinematography: Subhasish Bandopadhyay
- Edited by: Debasish Sarkar
- Music by: Chandrabindoo (band)
- Release date: 2000
- Running time: 32 minutes
- Country: India
- Language: Bengali

Y2K (Athoba, 'Sex Krome Aasitechhe') is a 2000 Bengali short film from Satyajit Ray Film and Television Institute, written and directed by Chandril Bhattacharya.

== Plot ==
Chanchal, a young Calcuttan, spends most of his time finding a suitable girl to satisfy his love interest. After being disillusioned on several occasions, he finally manages to get proximity of a beautiful girl. But no sooner had he succeeded to win the girl's attention, than he becomes blind in a curse of God.

== Cast ==
- Mrinmoy Nandi as Chanchol
- Sreelekha Mitra as Neela
- Silajit Majumder as Heeru
- Gargi Roychowdhury as Leena
- Rajatabha Dutta as Bhooto
- Chirantan Dasgupta as Hiron
- Miss Jojo (Bengali singer) as Namita
- Anubrata Chakrabarty as Anubrata
- Shantanu Basu as Ani
- Debjit Nag as Bishu
- Dwijen Bondhopadhyay as God
- Anindya Banerjee as Nirmal
- Papri Ghosh as Preeti
- Mita Banerjee as Namita's mother
- Anindya Chatterjee as Prafulla
- Kashinath Ghosh
- Babun
- Partha Dutta
- Maharatna Banerjee
- Shuvodeep Ghosh
- Sandip Sengupta

== Playback singers ==
- Sanchari Mukherjee
- Kasturi Mukherjee
- Jagannath Guha
- Debashish Sarkar
- Abhirup Das
- Sayandeb Mukherjee

== Music ==
Chandrabindoo (band)
