= Habu Chandra Raja Gobu Chandra Montri =

Bengali comedy-drama film

Hobu Chondro Raja Gobu Chondro Montri
- Directed by: Aniket Chattopadhyay
- Story by: Dakshinaranjan Mitra Majumder
- Produced by: Dev
- Starring: Saswata Chatterjee; Kharaj Mukhopadhyay; Arpita Chatterjee
- Cinematography: Supriyo Datta; Harendra Singh
- Edited by: Md. Kalam
- Music by: Kabir Suman
- Production company: Dev Entertainment Ventures
- Release date: 10 October 2021
- Running time: 121:49 minutes
- Country: India
- Language: Bengali

Habu Chandra Raja Gobu Chandra Montri is a Bengali fantasy comedy film directed by Aniket Chattopadhyay under the banner of Dev Entertainment Ventures. The film is based on stories by Dakshinaranjan Mitra Majumder. It had a direct television premiere on Jalsha Movies on 10 October 2021 coinciding with Puja holidays.

== Plot ==
The film tells the story of a king named Hobu Chandra, the king of Bombagarh. He was very kind and generous. His subjects were happy and content. There was enough food and drink for everyone. The king had a wise octogenarian prime minister who used to give good advice to him. Everyone in Bombagarh was happy with their king and prime minister.

Then the king married the princess Kusumkumari of Chandragarh. It was a time of celebration. There were magic, song, and dance performances. And then, one day, the king saw someone standing and staring at them; his dress and look were not like the others; he seemed to be a foreigner in Bombagarh. The king called him. The man came and introduced himself as Gobu Chandra from Gujjar Kingdom.

Gobu proved that he could make money out of thin air. The king became happy, and Gobu convinced him to make him the new Mantri, replacing and firing the old Mantri. This changes everything. Gobu also gives the Raja and Rani special glasses, which show them a false reality where their subjects are happy and satisfied. The kingdom is now in chaos.

The King makes many nonsensical decisions, advised by Gobu. When sweet sellers tell the King that they face severe loss as their sweets won't sell, the King makes the price of Rasgulla the same as the puffed rice (Muri).

When a thief dies from a wall falling on him, Gobu tries to find a murderer when there is none. The first accused is the creator of the wall which fell on the thief. He further accuses the labor who made the wall. The labor then accuses the person who gave him the mud to make the wall. The person who made the mud, accuses a shepherd of making his mud soft by having his cows shit on it. The innocent shepherd is sentenced to death.

The death sentence of the Shepherd fails due to his extremely lightweight. The townsmen laugh at the King and his administration. Gobu brings a fat person to die instead of the shepherd. The fat person is friends with a Sanyas, who also happens to be a friend to the previous Minister. The Sanyas and a powerful Magician plot a way to make the King fire Gobu.

The next day, when the fat person is about to be killed, he smilingly tells the King to do the job fast, by the instructions of the Sanyas. The Sanyas then appears to the King, describing how he is a powerful Mahapurush like he is. To prove his word, he even tells the King about things no one has ever known from his life. The King, satisfied, believes the Sanyas. The Sanyas then means the King; he must put his Minister to death instead. He then says that if he isn't set to end, all his subjects will bleed and die. When Gobu questions the Sanyas' legitimacy, the King denies killing Gobu. Then the Magician we saw earlier makes many townsmen bleed from their mouths, just as the Sanyas had said. The Sanyas' legitimacy is proved, and the King considers putting Gobu to the death sentence.

Gobu is frightened and tells the King the truth so he fires him. Furious by knowing the truth, the King orders that Gobu should be kicked out of the Kingdom. The Sanyas then tells the King and Queen about the people's suffering and the magic in the glasses. The King and Queen throw away the glasses and ask the Sanyas what they should do. The Sanyas tells them to hire their old Minister. The King and Queen then ask the Sanyas, wouldn't that mean the old Minister will be put to death? The Sanyas then reveals it was a lie, so Gobu reveals the truth. Gobu is kicked out of the Kingdom while the townsmen throw eggs, tomatoes, etc., on him. The Kingdom now lives Happily Ever After.

In a mid-credits scene, we see Gobu telling the audience that he will return and take revenge.

== Cast ==
- Saswata Chatterjee as Raja Hobu Chandra
- Kharaj Mukhopadhyay as Mantri Gobu Chandra
- Arpita Chatterjee as Rani Kusumkali
- Subhasish Mukherjee as Briddha Mantri Manabendra
- Barun Chanda as Gurudeb

== Release ==
It released on Jalsha Movies on 10 October 2021 coinciding with Puja holidays.

== Reception ==
Nandita Acharya of Anandabazar Patrika reviewed the film on a positive note and wrote "The film successfully accommodates many present world elements and ideas in rhyming dialogue backed scenes in the film, which lends the film an appropriate comic touch." She praised the acting of the lead cast, the music and background score but bemoaned the lack of subplot in the quick change in the character of the king.
