= Honeymoon (2018 film) =

Indian Bengali-language film

- Directed by: Premendu Bikash Chaki
- Written by: Samaresh Basu
- Produced by: Nishpal Singh
- Starring: Soham Chakraborty; Subhashree Ganguly; Ranjit Mullick; Rudranil Ghosh
- Production company: Surinder Films Pvt Ltd
- Release date: 23 February 2018
- Country: India
- Language: Bengali

Honeymoon is a 2018 Indian Bengali language comedy drama film directed by Premendu Bikash Chaki and produced by Nispal Singh under the banner of Surinder Films. It stars Soham Chakraborty, Subhashree Ganguly, Ranjit Mullick and Rudranil Ghosh in a lead role. The film was released on 23 February 2018.

== Cast ==
- Soham Chakraborty as Gitin
- Subhashree Ganguly as Jayati
- Ranjit Mullick as Pranesh Bhattacharya
- Rudranil Ghosh
- Rahul Chakraborty

== Reception ==
Debolina Sen of Times of India granted the film three stars out of five and noted "From the title, you would expect it to be a romantic-genre film unless you are aware of the fact that it is a Samaresh Basu-inspired story that has been earlier made into a Soumitra Chatterjee-Aparna Sen-Utpal Dutt starrer, Chhutir Phande (1975)."
