= Aami Ashbo Phirey =

- Promotional movie poster
- Directed by: Anjan Dutt
- Produced by: Shrikant Mohta; Mahendra Soni
- Starring: Anjan Dutt; Swastika Mukherjee; Kaushik Sen; Anindya Chatterjee; Darshana Banik; Sauraseni Maitra; Anjana Basu
- Cinematography: Gairik Sarkar
- Edited by: Arghyakamal Mitra
- Music by: Neel Dutt
- Production company: Shree Venkatesh Films
- Release date: 13 April 2018 (Kolkata)
- Country: India
- Language: Bengali

Aami Ashbo Phirey (English: "I shall return") is a 2018 India Bengali-language drama film directed by Anjan Dutt and produced by Shree Venkatesh Films. The film stars Anjan Dutt, Kaushik Sen, Swastika Mukherjee, Anindya Chatterjee, Darshana Banik, Sauraseni Maitra, and Anjana Basu. Dutt collaborated on the music with his son Neel Dutt, who composed the music to his father's lyrics. The film was released on 13 April 2018.

== Plot ==
The film depicts the stories of four people who deal with pain and violence through music. All the stories are connected by a violent incident. The film also showcases the influence of virtual media on personal life in the modern era.

== Cast ==
- Anjan Dutt
- Swastika Mukherjee
- Kaushik Sen
- Anjana Basu
- Darshana Banik
- Sauraseni Maitra
- Anindya Chatterjee

== Production ==
In January 2018, Shree Venkatesh Films announced 25 projects, among them was Aami Ashbo Phirey. Director Anjan Dutt said in an interview that the film was an attempt to "look into my legacy of Bangla cinema, my literature, and tap the mainstream". Dutt collaborated on the music with his son, Neel Dutt, who composed the music to his father's lyrics. The two had previously worked together on a film 11 years earlier. This was also Dutt's second collaboration with Parno Mittra, with whom he had worked in 2011 on Ranjana Ami Ar Ashbona. It was Dutt's first collaboration with Swastika Mukherjee.

== Soundtrack ==
"Aami Ashbo Phirey"

Song by Neel Dutt
- Language: Bengali
- Published: 2018

Music video
- "Monkharaper Bikele" at YouTube

Dutt has admitted that he always preferred making musical films. The film features "songs of an unknown, unheard young singer/songwriter" which impact the lives of four characters. The Times of India stated that the film's songs give "the feel of classic Anjan [Dutt] songs that once broke stereotypes regularly".

All lyrics are written by Anjan Dutt; all music is composed by Neel Dutt.

Aami Ashbo Phirey
No.	Title	Singer	Length
1.	"Aami Ashbo Phirey"	Neel Dutt	5:03
2.	"Jaay Phuriye"	Amlaan A Chakraborty	4:32
3.	"Koto Koto Eka Eka"	Anjan Dutt	4:37
4.	"Monkharaper Bikele"	Neel Dutt	4:59
5.	"Cigarette"	Anjan Dutt	4:48
6.	"Lai La Lai"	Anjan Dutt, Neel Dutt	4:03

== Release and reception ==
The official trailer of the film was released on 12 February 2018. The film released on 13 April 2018.
