= Chupkatha =

2012 Bengali film

- Theatrical release poster
- Directed by: Souvick Sarkar; Dipankar Pal
- Screenplay by: Souvick Sarkar
- Story by: Souvick Sarkar
- Produced by: Pratap Mandal
- Starring: See below
- Cinematography: Debendra Chandra Das
- Edited by: Moloy Banerjee
- Music by: Silajit Majumder
- Distributed by: Great Overseas Commodeal Ltd.
- Release date: 7 December 2012 (Kolkata)
- Country: India
- Language: Bengali

Chupkatha is a 2012 Bengali film directed by Souvick Sarkar and Dipankar Pal, and produced by Pratap Mandal under the banner of Great Overseas Commodeal Ltd. Based on extra-marital affairs, the film features actors Silajit Majumder, Aparajita Auddy and Payel Roy in the lead roles. It was released on 7 December 2012. In this film singer Silajit Majumder made his debut as a music composer.

== Plot ==
The film is about an extra-marital affair involving a married man and a medical student. Sambit (Silajit Majumder) and his wife (Aparajita Auddy) are in love but they could never express their love for each other. Anwesha (Payel Roy) is a young medical student who happens to be as lonely as Sambit. Both of them required someone to share their emotions with. As a result, they start finding themselves comfortable with each other. Sambit helps Anwesha while she is still a student and in return, she gives him company. They experience an unspoken closeness towards each other and fall into a complicated relationship. Because the relationship has no future, neither of them could express their feelings, even as they love and share a mutual respect towards each other. Sambit later has a heart attack and Anwesha performs the operation for free since she considered she owed Sambit this. In the end, they part just as they met, and things remain the way they were earlier.

== Cast ==
- Silajit Majumder as Sambit
- Aparajita Auddy as Sambit's wife
- Payel Roy as Anwesha
- Bhaswar Chattopadhyay as Dr. Mukherjee
- Rumki Chatterjee as Anwesha's mother
- Ratri Ghatak
- Biplab Banerjee
- Sougata Bandyopadhyay

== Soundtrack ==
Chupkatha

Soundtrack album by Silajit Majumder
- Released: 2012
- Recorded: 2012
- Genre: Film soundtrack

Silajit Majumder chronology
Raat Barota Panch (2005)	Chupkatha (2012)	Strugglers: The Reality Behind (2013)

The music of the film was composed by Silajit Majumder and the lyrics were penned by Srijato. Regarding the film score of Chupkatha, Silajit Majumder told that this was the first time he was doing full-fledged music for a film. The background music of the movie is scored by Rajkumar Sengupta.

=== Track listing ===
No.	Title	Singer(s)	Length
1.	"Chupkatha"	Indradeep Dasgupta, Ananya Bhattacharya
2.	"Bodlay Rojer Jibon"	Srijato
3.	"Ekla"	RJ Radhika
4.	"Boye Jawa Rojer Jibon"	Joy Sarkar
5.	"Chupkatha (Female)"	Ananya Bhattacharya
6.	"Tomar Kheya"	Ananya Bhattacharya
7.	"Bekheyali"	Srijato
8.	"Tomar Kheya – 2"	Kamalika Chatterjee
