= 8:08 Er Bongaon Local =

2012 Bengali film

- Bengali: ০৮:০৮ এর বনগাঁ লোকাল
- Directed by: Debaditya Bandopadhyay
- Written by: Padnmanabha Dasgupta
- Produced by: Torun Raut
- Starring: Tapas Paul; Swastika Mukherjee; Rajesh Sharma
- Cinematography: Protip Mukhopadhyay; Basob Mallick
- Edited by: Sanjib Datta
- Music by: Tanmoy Bose
- Production company: Unimass Entertainment
- Release date: 27 April 2012
- Running time: 123 minutes
- Country: India
- Language: Bengali

8:08 Er Bongaon Local is a Bengali vigilante social drama film directed by Debaditya Bandyopadhyay and produced by Torun Raut. This film was released on 27 April 2012 under the banner of Unimass Entertainment. This movie was based on an infamous incident of eve teasing and murder at Barasat, North 24 Parganas in 2011.

== Plot ==
Ananta Das is a middle-class common man who commutes daily on the 8:08 A.M. Bongaon Local to Sealdah for his office job. During his regular journey towards Kolkata, he realizes that people have stopped protesting against any form of injustice due to fear or depression, and he, too, has become spineless like others. However, an incident shocks him and changes his mindset completely. One day, a student is killed by goons for protesting against the eve-teasing of his elder sister. At first, Ananta refrains from taking action, but later he bursts out with anger and protests against every wrong deed in his surroundings.

== Cast ==
- Tapas Paul as Ananta Das
- Manoj Mitra as Ananta's Father
- Swastika Mukherjee as Shreyashi, a news reporter
- Raghubir Yadav as Rickshaw puller
- Haradhan Bandopadhyay as Doctor
- Rajesh Sharma as Shishir, a Police officer
- Kanchana Moitra as Sima
- Sonali Chowdhury
- Anamika Saha as a Brothel owner (guest appearance)
- Anushree Das as Ananta's Wife
- Ratan Sarkhel
- Bhaskar Banerjee as Ananta's Office Colleague
- Krishnokishore Mukherjee as a Police officer
- Diganta Bagchi as Rajat, News Anchor
- Shamik Sinha as Raju Dutta, a local goon

== Reception ==
The Times of India rated the movie 3.6 noting this film belongs to Tapas Paul. It’s unfortunate that his acting potential has not been tapped the way it should have in contemporary Bengali movies.
