= Mahapurush O Kapurush =

2013 Indian Bengali film

- Directed by: Aniket Chattopadhyay
- Written by: Aniket Chattopadhyay
- Screenplay by: Aniket Chattopadhyay
- Story by: Aniket Chattopadhyay
- Produced by: Reliance Entertainment
- Starring: See below
- Cinematography: Premendu Bikash Chaki
- Edited by: Md. Kalam
- Music by: Savvy Gupta
- Release date: 17 May 2013 (Kolkata)
- Country: India
- Language: Bengali

Mahapurush O Kapurush is a 2013 Indian Bengali language comedy drama film written and directed by Aniket Chattopadhyay.

== Plot ==
Bireshwar Chatterjee (Dipankar De), a wealthy industrialist, is a very happy man. The reason for his happiness is that Shri Shri Sadgajananda Maharaj (Bratya Basu), a holy man with powers that control even the Andromeda Galaxy (boasted by Sadgajananda himself), is residing at his house. Naturally, many people from the upper strata of the society (the mayor, a tollywood actress, a writer, etc.) come to pay homage to the saint. Unknown to everyone, Sadgajananda is actually a con man, Gopal, who makes a living conning people, along with his partner, Aapu (Lama). In a parallel story, a thief (also Bratya Basu) breaks into a house of a family of four people, where he is accidentally killed. The family members decide to dispose of the dead body in some remote area but are constantly harassed by the police inspector (Biswanath Basu). By a series of events, the dead body lands up in Bireshwar's mansion, where meanwhile, Sadgajananda and his partner had fled with valuables, leaving Bireshwar's prestige in jeopardy.

== Cast ==
- Bratya Basu
- Lama Halder
- Dipankar De
- Locket Chatterjee
- Tanuka Chatterjee
- Bhola Tamang
- Ritwick Chakraborty
- Rimjhim Mitra
- Sujoy Prosad Chatterjee
- Biswanath Basu
- Koneenica Banerjee
- Kanchana Maitra
- Badshah Moitra (cameo)
- Supriyo Datta

== See also ==
- Bye Bye Bangkok, a 2011 Bengali-language films
