= Palasher Biye =

2024 film

- Release poster
- Directed by: Premendu Bikash Chaki
- Starring: Mimi Chakraborty; Somraj Maity
- Distributed by: ZEE5
- Release date: 9 February 2024
- Running time: 92 minutes
- Country: India
- Language: Bengali

Palasher Biye (Marriage of Palash) is a 2024 romantic comedy film directed by Premendu Bikash Chaki This film was released on 9 February 2024 under the banner of Roadshow Films.

== Plot ==
Palash hails from a traditional joint family of North Kolkata. His grandmother wants to see his marriage before her death. Palash falls in love with Shalini but Shalini has different values and lifestyle which do not suit their family's culture.

== Cast ==
- Somraj Maity as Palash
- Alokananda Roy as Palash's grandmother
- Biswajit Chakraborty
- Mimi Chakraborty as Shalini
- Anjana Basu
- Dolon Roy
- Subhrajit Dutta
- Rajat Gangopadhyay
