= Mukut =

2023 Indian television series

- Genre: Drama Thriller
- Created by: Blues Productions
- Written by: Snehashis Chakraborty
- Directed by: Ranjan Roy
- Starring: Shrabani Bhunia; Argha Mitra
- Theme music composer: Chandrika Bhattacharya
- Opening theme: "Aa aaa ei Mukut Mukut"
- Country of origin: India
- Original language: Bengali
- No. of episodes: 130

Production
- Executive producers: Runa De Sarkar; Paromita; Aniruddha
- Producer: Snehashis Chakraborty
- Camera setup: Multi-camera
- Running time: 22 minutes
- Production company: Blues Productions

Original release
- Network: Zee Bangla
- Release: 27 March – 22 September 2023

Mukut is a 2023 Indian Bengali Drama television series that premiered on 27 March 2023 on Zee Bangla. The series is produced under the banner of Blues Productions. It stars Shrabani Bhunia and Argha Mitra in lead roles.

== Cast ==
=== Main ===
- Shrabani Bhunia as Mukut Karmakar: Rayan's wife
- Arghya Mitra as Rayan Roy Chowdhury: Mukut's husband; Ayan, Sreyan and Lagna's brother

=== Recurring ===
- Sriparna Roy as Dol Roy Chowdhury (née Mukherjee): Ayan's wife; Rayan's friend; Ahir's cousin sister.
- Ananda Ghosh as Ayan Roy Chowdhury: Rayan, Sreyan and Lagna's brother; Dhol's husband.
- Indrakshi Dey as Lagna Mukherjee (née Roy Chowdhury): Ayan, Sreyan and Rayan's sister; Ahir's wife.
- Gourav Ghoshal as Shreyan Roy Chowdhury: Ayan, Rayan and Lagna's brother; Tuli's husband.
- Sukanya Chatterjee as Tuli Roy Chowdhury: Sreyan's wife
- Maahi Kar as Puja Roy Chowdhury: Ayan, Sreyan, Rayan and Lagna's cousin sister; Tapothi's daughter.
- Aditya Chowdhury as Ahir Mukherjee: Lagna's husband; Dhol's cousin brother.
- Indrakshi Nag as Kuhu: Ayan, Sreyan, Rayan and Lagna's aunt.
- Bulbuli Panja as Bonya Roy Chowdhury: Ayan, Sreyan, Rayan and Lagna's aunt.
- Sankar Sanku Chakraborty as Bonya's husband; Ayan, Sreyan, Rayan and Lagna's uncle.
- Jayanta Dutta Banerjee as Abhay Goswami: Kuhu's husband.
- Rii Sen as Phuli: Ayan, Sreyan, Rayan and Lagna's aunt.
- Judhajit Banerjee as Ramanimohan Halder: Phuli's husband; A woman trafficker.
- Soma Dey as Suhashini Roy Chowdhury: Ayan, Sreyan, Rayan and Lagna's grandmother.
- Tapashi Roy Chowdhury as Tapothi: Pooja's mother; Ayan, Sreyan, Rayan and Lagna's aunt.
- Subhasish Mukherjee as Paresh Karmakar: Rubi's ex-husband; Mukut's father.
- Ayeashrya Chatterjee as Sree aka Piku: Rayan's fiancee.
- Somasree Chaki as Dol's aunt; Nanda's mother
- Sreetama Baidya as Nanda: Dol's cousin sister.
- Moumita Gupta as Rubi Banerjee: A philanthropist. Mukut's mother; Ohik, Oishe and Mehek's stepmother; Paresh's ex-wife; Pritam's second wife.
- Manishankar Banerjee as Pritam Banerjee: Ruby's second husband; Ohik, Oishe and Mehek's father.
- Amitava Das as Ohik Banerjee: Pritam's son; Mukut's stepbrother; Oishe and Mehek's brother; Mouli's husband.
- Rupsha Chatterjee as Mouli Banerjee: Ohik's wife.
- Kaushiki Basu as Oishe Banerjee: Pritam's daughter; Mukut's stepsister; Ohik and Mehek's sister.
- Roshni Ghosh as Mehek Banerjee: Pritam's daughter; Mukut's stepsister; Ohik and Oishe's sister.
- Ishita Chatterjee as Ishani: Arnab and Rumpa's mother.
- Goutam Mukherjee as Ishani's husband; Arnab and Rumpa's father.
- Susmita Roy Chakraborty as Rumpa: Arnab's sister.
- Arnab Chowdhury as Arnab: Oishe's fiance.
- Ayush Mukherjee as Ayush Mukherjee: Pooja's lover.
- Srijita Dona Chakrabarty as Sanghamitra Ghosh
- Subhajit Banerjee as Jandaar: A woman trafficker and kidnapper.
- Sagarika Roy as Dilruba: A woman trafficker.
- Sanjib Sarkar as Nikunja Mukherjee aka Moharaj: Ahir's father and a woman trafficker.
- Kanchana Moitra as Jayati Sarkar: Swarnali and Rupali's mother.
- Riya Ganguly Chakroborty as Swarnali: Rupali's sister.
- Arpita Roy as Rupali: Rayan's fiancee; Mukut's best friend.
- Debjoy Mallick as Alam: A woman trafficker.
- Ashim Mukhopadhyay as Pratapaditya: police officer; Jayati's husband; Swarnali and Rupali's father.
