= Shikar (2006 film) =

- Theatrical release poster
- Directed by: Saran Dutta
- Written by: Saran Dutta
- Screenplay by: Saran Dutta
- Story by: Saran Dutta
- Starring: Koel Mallick; Amitabh Bhattacharjee; Rajesh Sharma
- Cinematography: Soumik Haldar
- Edited by: Sharmistha Jha
- Music by: Ashok Bhadra
- Production company: Cine Friends 2003
- Release date: 1 December 2006 (Kolkata)
- Running time: 150 minutes
- Country: India
- Language: Bengali
- Box office: 20 lakh

Shikar (transl. Hunt) is a 2006 Bengali-language action thriller film written and directed by Saran Dutta and produced under the banner of Cine Friends 2003. The film stars actors Koel Mallick, Amitabh Bhattacharjee and Rajesh Sharma. Music of the film has been composed by Ashok Bhadra. The film was released on 1 December 2006.

== Plot ==
An astrologer by profession, Baburam Panja is the gang-leader of a group of goons who murder people for money. Saheb, Hero and Khyapa are three skilled members of his group. Police officer Rajesh Yadav, who knows about the misdeeds of Baburam, hatches a plan to catch him. He gets hold of Saheb, whom he thought as a bait to catch Baburam. In the police station, Saheb was beaten to death. However, later the fact is revealed that the person, whom Rajesh mistook as Saheb, was actually Bimal, his lookalike. Seema, Bimal's wife, tried to save him, but was unfortunately sent to a brothel. In the brothel, Seema attempted suicide, but was saved by Reshmi and some other people. On the other hand, Saheb, Khyapa and Hero visited the brothel and came across all the facts that happened with Seema. Saheb, who became extremely wrathful on hearing what happened with the innocent couple, decided to save Seema from Baburam by killing him. Meanwhile, Rajesh came to know about the real incident and his mistake. He became furious upon realizing that Saheb was still alive in the brothel. He again arranges a plot, where he uses Baburam as the bait. He thought that after Saheb kills Baburam, he will kill him too. A dramatic encounter follows the events after the trio kill Baburam, where Khyapa and Hero died and Saheb was released by Rajesh who felt pity for him. A severely injured Saheb returns to the brothel to meet Seema, who in the course of incidents, fell in love with him. The film ends as Saheb and Seema leave the brothel to start a new life together.

== Cast ==
- Koel Mallick as Seema
- Amitabh Bhattacharjee as Saheb/Bimal
- Rajesh Sharma as Police Officer Rajesh Yadav
- Shantilal Mukhopadhyay as Baburam Panja
- Kanchan Mullick as Khyapa
- Sagnik Chattopadhyay as Hero
- June Malia as Reshmi
- Kharaj Mukherjee as Ramu
- Tapas Paul as senior police officer of Rajesh

== Soundtrack ==
Shikar

Soundtrack album by Ashok Bhadra
- Released: 2006
- Genre: Feature film soundtrack
- Length: 26:38

Ashok Bhadra chronology
| Abhimanyu (2006) | Shikar (2006) | Prem (2007) |

Ashok Bhadra composed the music for Shikar. Lyrics are penned by Saran Dutta and Priyo Chattopadhyay.

=== Track listing ===
| No. | Title | Lyrics | Singer(s) | Length |
|---|---|---|---|---|
| 1. | "Du Chokhe Oi Aalto Hasi" | Saran Dutta | Shreya Ghoshal, Babul Supriyo | 5:05 |
| 2. | "Bhagaban Bhyabachyaka" | Saran Dutta | Jojo, Kharaj Mukherjee, Shamik Sinha | 3:35 |
| 3. | "Ektu Hasir Chhonwate" | Saran Dutta | Kumar Sanu | 3:55 |
| 4. | "Ki Katha Lekha" | Priyo Chattopadhyay | Udit Narayan, Sadhana Sargam | 5:11 |
| 5. | "Mone Kanna Amar" | Priyo Chattopadhyay | Kumar Sanu | 4:33 |
| 6. | "Sumanar Mon Bhalo" | Priyo Chattopadhyay | Abhijeet Bhattacharya, Shaan | 4:19 |
| Total length: | | | | 26:38 |
