= Mahanayika =

- Mahanayika's Bengali film poster
- Directed by: Saikat Bhakat
- Written by: Saikat Bhakat
- Screenplay by: Saikat Bhakat, Swagata Chakraborty Bhakat
- Produced by: Ramkrishna Banerjee
- Starring: Rituparna Sengupta; Indraneil Sengupta; Soumitra Chatterjee; Saheb Chatterjee; Chandan Sen; Sudipa Basu
- Music by: Nachiketa
- Production company: RKB Films
- Distributed by: RKB Films
- Release date: February 12, 2016 (India)
- Running time: 2 hrs 13 minutes
- Country: India
- Language: Bengali
- Budget: ₹ 1,00,00,000/-

Mahanayika is a 2016 Indian Bengali drama film written and directed by Saikat Bhakat, and starring Rituparna Sengupta, Indraneil Sengupta, Soumitra Chatterjee, and Saheb Chatterjee.

== Plot ==
Shakuntala Sen (Rituparna Sengupta) is the princess of the glamour world. Her lover Aniruddha Mukherjee (Saheb Chatterjee) is a hero. Aniruddha's father Arindam (Soumitra Chatterjee) is the biggest producer of the film world. Shakuntala's would be father in law wants a hold on her career. Somehow Shakuntala agrees when she counts it as a question of stability of her future and decides to marry Aniruddha.

But a new crisis arises when detective officer Priyabrato Roy (Indraneil Sengupta) arrives in her life to exhume the black incidents from her past. She feels victimized and exploited by Priyobrata as he goes on revealing some bitter truths and dark secrets to her. We even see her go to bed with Priyabrato to settle everything. But at the end, we realise that Priyabrato doesn't exist in reality but as her conscience that reminds her of her past relationships and how Rajat's love was unrequited by her. By this time, she has been sufficiently panged to break relations with Mukherjee family, only to return to work and focus on her career once again.

== Cast ==
- Rituparna Sengupta as Shakuntala Sen
- Indraneil Sengupta as Priyabrato Roy
- Soumitra Chatterjee as Arindam Mukherjee
- Saheb Chatterjee as Aniruddha Mukherjee
- Chandan Sen
- Sudipa Basu

== Production ==
The original working title of the film was Nayika, but the director Saikat Bhakat changed it to Mahanayika. In January 2015, it was revealed that debutante director Saikat Bhakat had brought Rituparna Sengupta aboard her project Mahanayika to play the lead role of Rituparna Sengupta, and even though inspired by the life of Suchitra Sen the project would not be a biopic.

== Soundtrack ==
The album, containing 9 songs, were created by Nachiketa and Rabindranath Tagore. The lyrics are penned by Nachiketa and Rabindranath Tagore. The music is distributed by Assure Digital Services Pvt. Ltd.

S. No.	Song title	Music	Singer(s)	Duration
1	"Aji Jharer Raate"	Rabindranath Tagore	Mousumi Banerjee	4:28
2	"Amra Dujon" (Female)	Nachiketa	Moumita Ghosh	3:37
3	"Amra Dujon" (Male)	Nachiketa	Rajarshi Seal	3:37
4	"Dang Dang"	Nachiketa	Sumana Ray, Ishaksha Nath Dey	5:07
5	"E Nachi"	Nachiketa	Nachiketa	3:54
6	"Jaago"	Nachiketa	Nachiketa	3:34
7	"Kato Chena Mukh"	Nachiketa	Nachiketa	5:06
8	"O Chand"	Rabindranath Tagore	Srabani Sen	3:51
9	"Tor Raat Jaga"	Nachiketa	Dhansiri Chakraborty	4:22
