= NH6 (TV series) =

2023 Indian web series

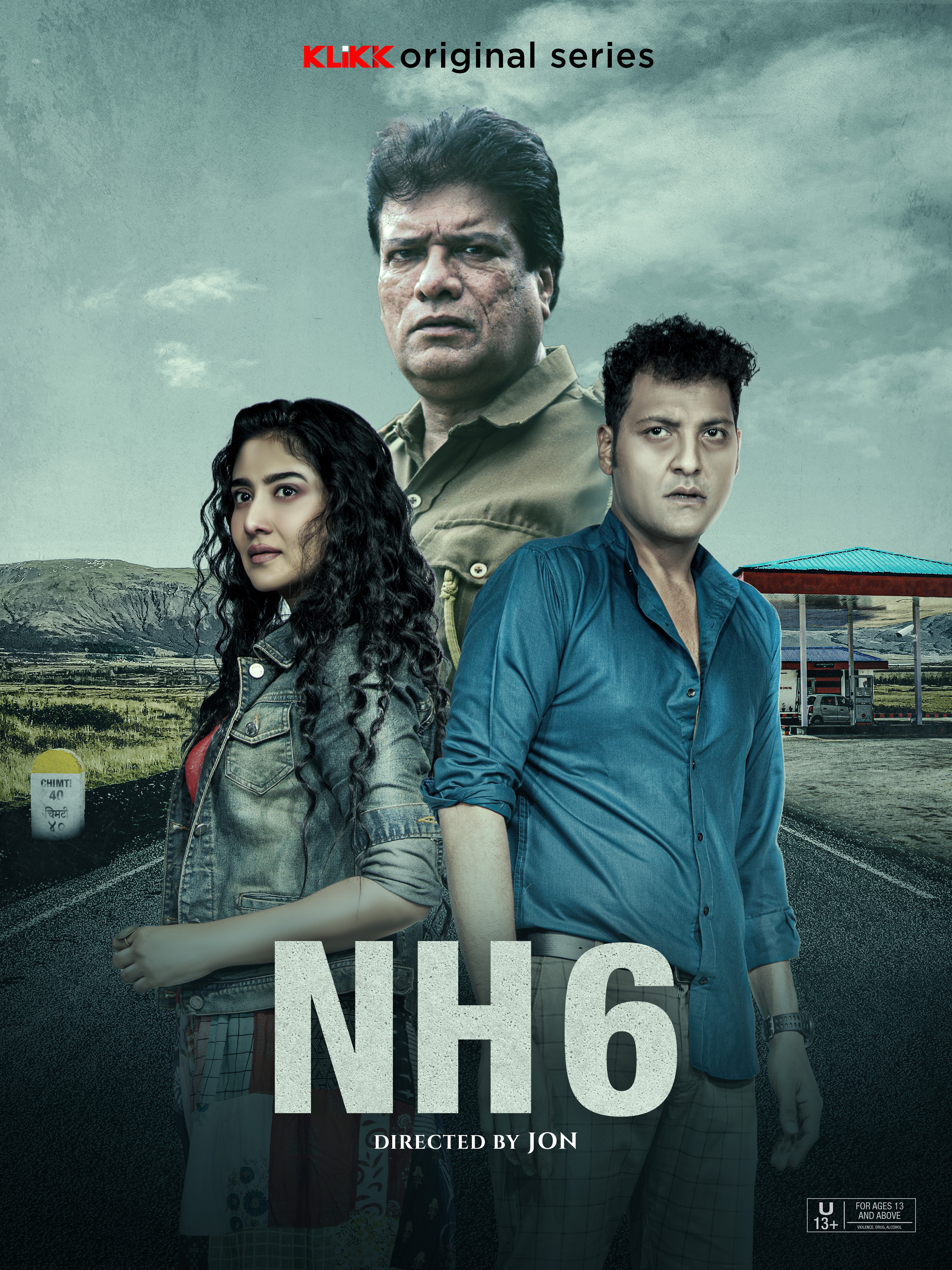
- Genre: Thriller, crime
- Written by: Soumik Chattopadhyay
- Directed by: Jon Halder
- Starring: Rajesh Sharma, Debolina Dutta, Judhajit Sarkar
- Country of origin: India
- Original language: Bengali
- No. of seasons: 1
- No. of episodes: 4

Production
- Cinematography: Anir
- Running time: 16–20 minutes

Original release
- Release: 16 October 2023

NH6 is a 2023 Indian Bengali language crime and thriller web series directed by Jon Halder and written by Soumik Chattopadhyay.

The series premiered on Klikk, and stars Rajesh Sharma, Debolina Dutta and Judhajit Sarkar. Episode runtimes range from 16–20 minutes.

== Synopsis ==
The narrative centers on a road trip that Bob, a real estate investor, and his wife Nimisha take. In order to meet Nimisha's parents, the couple moves in her direction. Bob is paying Nimisha's parents a visit for the first time, so the couple is all fired up about the encounter. Even though everything appears to be picture-perfect, Bob's car breaks down in a desolate area of the highway, changing the course of their journey. Bob calls a tow truck to come help him just as an enigmatic motorist on the same route offers to help. Bob inquires with the man about any hotels because Nimisha has to go to the bathroom. The man mentions the closest gas station with a bathroom. Nimisha agrees to take the stranger's ride to the gas station. From this point forward, things take an extremely confusing turn. Nimisha vanishes without warning. Bob, overcome with hopelessness, seeks assistance from the local police. Surprisingly, there's no proof to support his wife's presence during the trip. Even the man who offered Bob assistance while driving denies ever having seen Nimisha. This is not where the mystery ends. Nimisha's mother denies ever knowing Bob when police get in touch with her parents.

== Cast ==
- Rajesh Sharma
- Debolina Dutta
- Judhajit Sarkar

== Episodes ==
No.	Title	Directed by	Original release date
1	"Chor"	Jon Halder	16 October 2023
A married couple sets out to visit the girl's parents. In the interim, the girl vanishes for no apparent reason and the car breaks down.
2	"Police"	Jon Halder	16 October 2023
The police assist the man in his search for the girl, but as time goes on and there is no girl in the journey, the police begin to have doubts about him. It was all in his head.
3	"Dakat"	Jon Halder	16 October 2023
As the story goes on, the man makes every effort to demonstrate that his wife is missing, but a horrible conspiracy is revealed.
4	"Babu"	Jon Halder	16 October 2023
Everyone already knows the outcome of the epic twist in the story. The man finds his wife.
