= Kabir (film) =

2018 Bengali action thriller film by Aniket Chattopadhyay

- Theatrical release poster
- Directed by: Aniket Chattopadhyay
- Written by: Aniket Chattopadhyay
- Produced by: Dev Entertainment Ventures
- Starring: Dev; Rukmini Maitra; Priyanka Sarkar
- Cinematography: Harendra Singh
- Edited by: Rabiranjan Maitra
- Music by: Indraadip Dasgupta
- Distributed by: Dev Entertainment Ventures
- Release date: 13 April 2018
- Running time: 110:00 minutes (A) / 106:46 minutes (V/UA)
- Country: India
- Language: Bengali

Kabir (subtitled as Peace Has A Price; Bengali pronunciation: [kɔbiːr]) is a 2018 Indian Bengali-language spy action thriller film written and directed by Aniket Chattopadhyay. Produced by Gurupada Adhikari and Dev under the banner of Dev Entertainment Ventures, the film is based on the arrest of the Indian Mujahideen (IM) terrorist Yasin Bhatkal. It stars Dev himself in the titular role, alongside Rukmini Maitra and Priyanka Sarkar in the lead roles, while Kamaleshwar Mukherjee, Shataf Figar, Barun Chanda, Ambarish Bhattacharya in other pivotal roles.

The film follows a tense train journey from Mumbai to Kolkata where Yasmin (Rukmini) is held hostage by Abir (Dev), a seemingly ordinary man who reveals himself to be a terrorist seeking a former informer. Announced in 2017, it marks the first collaboration between Chattopadhyay and Dev. Principal photography for Kabir took place from July 2018 to October 2018 across multiple locations in Kolkata, Mumbai and Uttar Pradesh, whereas Chattopadhyay cited about most of its filming in a running-train, a rare in Indian cinema. The film features music composed by Indraadip Dasgupta, cinematography by Harendra Singh, and editing by Rabiranjan Maitra.

Kabir was released theatrically on 13 April 2018 and opened to highly positive reviews from critics, with praise for its cast performances, direction, cinematography, action sequences. The film emerged as a moderate commercial success and attained a cult status over the years.

== Plot ==
The story line of the film is based on apprehension of co-founder of Indian Mujahideen and conspirator of several bomb blasts in India, Yasin Bhatkal, by National Investigation Agency near Indo-Nepal border.

The story of the film begins with a few bomb blasts in Mumbai.

A burkha clad lady, Yasmin, aged in between 22/23 years, took a taxi from Zaveri Bazaar she was going to VT station. There were ambulances, police vehicles on the way. It was a scary afternoon. The taxi suddenly stopped, it was a comparatively lonely area. The taxi driver refused to give any reason but firmly said that he would not go towards VT. Yasmin was trying to get a lift, but the vehicles didn't stop. After a few minutes, a car stopped and agreed to give her a lift. The person inside introduced himself as Abir Chatterjee; he was also going to VT station.

On the way to VT, Yasmin had a phone conversation with her father, whom we found to be a half paralysed old man in his Kolkata house. She assured her father, who was watching TV news regarding Bomb blasts in Mumbai. The car reached VT stn, Yasmin got down, thanked Abir. She rushed to the station. Going inside the station, she found that the Duronto Express was late for 2hrs, so she went to the upper class waiting room. Yasmin & Abir met again in the compartment, they both were going to Howrah.

Kabir flirts with Yasmin though she is irritated, shares food with her and then enquires about her. As a matter of courtesy, Yasmin decides to ask more about Abir. Much to her shock, he reveals a live video of her father held hostage and a video of her cousin sister, Ruksana. He threatens to kill them if she doesn't reveal the location of Imtiaz. Her attempts to contact a few friends fail, and she is asked to reveal his location before the train reach Howrah.

The next day he reveals that he is a jihadi, and a majority of the passengers in their compartment are his aides. He adds that Imtiaz was a jihadi who foiled their attempts back in 2012 by informing the police. They badly want to murder the traitor. This changes Yasmin's attitude which in turn narrates another version of his story according to which it was the owner of the house who betrayed the terrorists; Imtiaz was killed by the special task force, and she herself is a jihadi. Abir, who in the meanwhile has changed his name to Altar Kabir, which he claims to be his original name, refuses to believe her as the photos of those dead jihadis and the rooms in which they lived had a different description from what she told. She is irritated by his behaviour and contacts the Syed, Indian Mujahideen third-in-command and gives information about Kabir through his unique code number (a unique code to identify the jihadis). Parallel to this, a few police officers struggling to decode those codes manage to trace Syed through Yasmin's phone call and arrest him.

Kabir reveals himself to be a special task officer assigned to bring down the Indian Mujahideen gang. Yasmin says that there is no use of arresting her as the Indian police will be forced to hand over her to their head gang in exchange for a few hostages. Kabir understanding the meaning of her statement, kills her and shoot his hand as if to show that he killed her while trying to defend himself from her.

== Cast ==
- Dev as DSP Altaf Kabir Kapoor (STF Officer) /Abir Chatterjee
- Rukmini Maitra as Yasmin Khatun
- Priyanka Sarkar as DCDD Damayanti Patekar (STF Officer)
- Shataf Figar as Parvez
- Krishnendu Dewanji as Ashfaq
- Pradip Mukhopadhyay as Muhammad Firoz, Yasmin's father
- Arno Mukhopadhyay as Imtiaz
- Kamaleshwar Mukherjee as Tamal Da
- Ambarish Bhattacharya as Tanmay
- Barun Chanda as Indian Mujahideen third-in-command, Syed Abdul Rahim Tunda
- Srijit Mukherjee (cameo appearance)
- Joy Badlani as local don

== Soundtrack ==
Kabir

Soundtrack album by Indraadip Das Gupta
- Released: 2018
- Recorded: 2017
- Studio: Dev Entertainment Ventures
- Genre: Feature film soundtrack

Indraadip Das Gupta chronology
Yeti Obhijaan (2017)	Kabir (2018)	Kishore Kumar Junior (2018)

Singles from Kabir
- 1. "Tere Darga Pe" Released: 10 Mar 2018; 2. "Akasheo Alpo Neel" Released: 24 Mar 2018; 3. "Kabir Title Track" Released: 31 Mar 2018

All lyrics are written by Srijato, Amit Chatterjee; all music is composed by Indraadip Das Gupta.

No.	Title	Lyrics	Singer(s)	Length
1.	"Akasheo Alpo Neel"	Srijato	Arijit Singh	05:09
2.	"Maula (Tere Darga Pe)"	Srijato	Ishan Mitra, Krishna Beura, Indraadip Das Gupta	07:15
3.	"Kabir (Title Track)"	Amit Chatterjee	Arijit Dev, Ishan Mitra, Nikhita Gandhi	04:15

== Accolades ==
Awards	Date of ceremony	Category	Recipient(s)	Result	Ref.
2nd WBFJA Awards	14 January 2019	Most Popular Actor	Dev	Won	
