= Aami Montri Hobo =

2011 Indian Bengali film

- Release poster
- Directed by: Partha Chakraborty
- Story by: Sunil Chakraborty
- Produced by: Goutam Naskar
- Starring: Debraj Ray; Kharaj Mukherjee; Manasi Sinha; Anamika Saha; Dulal Lahiri; Shakuntala Barua
- Music by: Shankar Goswami; Debashish
- Release date: 23 December 2011
- Country: India
- Language: Bengali

Aami Montri Hobo is a 2011 Bengali film directed by Partha Chakraborty and produced by Goutam Naskar.

== Cast ==
- Debraj Ray
- Kharaj Mukherjee
- Manasi Sinha
- Anamika Saha
- Dulal Lahiri
- Shakuntala Barua
