= Pakhi =

Pakhi or Pakkhi is an Indian forename.

== People with the given name ==
- Pakkhi Hegde (born 1972), Indian film actress
- Pakhi Tyrewala (born 1984), Indian film actress

== Film ==
- Pakhi (film), a Bollywood film starring Sumeet Kant Kaul and Pallavi Das
- Pakhi Roy Chaudhary, fictional character in the 2013 Indian film Lootera, played by Sonakshi Sinha

== Music ==
- Pakhi (album), a 2000 studio album by Zubeen Garg
