= Abar Basanta Bilap =

2018 Bengali-language film

- Directed by: Rajesh Dutta; Ipsita Roy Sarkar
- Produced by: Indrajit Roy Sarkar; Mahua Datta
- Starring: Paran Bandopadhyay; Kharaj Mukherjee; Moon Moon Sen; Bihu Mukherjee; Mir Afsar Ali; Satyahari Mondal
- Release date: 2018
- Country: India
- Language: Bengali

Abar Basanta Bilap is a 2018 Bengali-language romantic comedy film directed by Rajesh Dutta and Ipsita Roy Sarkar and produced by Indrajit Roy Sarkar and Mahua Datta. The film features Paran Bandopadhyay, Kharaj Mukherjee, Moon Moon Sen, Bihu Mukherjee, Mir Afsar Ali, and Satyahari Mondal in pivotal roles.

== Plot ==
Badur Bagan is a locality in North Kolkata. Beside the locality is a place named Muchi Bagan. Muchi Bagan looks exactly the same as North Kolkata, with old houses filled with big windows, wide ground floor balcony for chit chat and gossips, narrow streets, by lanes and so on.

And in this same locality our story's main character Anadi Chakraborty resides by paying only the sum of 50 INR as monthly rent. He is an upper class Brahmin. By not following his ancestor's footsteps and going to the same profession of being Hindu priests, he chooses to be a proofreader of an elite publication in College Street named Basanta Bilap, occupying the role of a senior proof reader there.

He often forgets things, and that is his flaw. For example, if his wife Nilima asked him to bring fish from the market, he brings green vegetables while returning. This absent mindedness continues in the office as well, and he often gets scolding from Paranpriyo, the manager. "You will soon lose your job, Anadi."

He himself used to stay very tense regarding this job, he used to murmur "maybe I will lose this job."

He has a son named Shibu Chakraborty, who is jobless spoilt brat. All of a sudden he falls for Radhika. However, the smart beautiful Radhika does not give a shit about it; she was not at all interested.

Radhika used to come to Muchi Bagan for Bengali tuition to Dimpida. Dimpida is bit different from the rest, bit feminine from inside. When he used to be in his college days, he was impressed by the character of Rishi Kapoor in the film named Sagar and started imagining himself as Dimple Kapadia.

== Cast ==
- Paran Bandopadhyay
- Kharaj Mukherjee
- Moon Moon Sen
- Bihu Mukherjee
- Mir Afsar Ali as Dimpida
- Satyahari Mondal

== Releases ==
The film was released on 13 July 2018 on theatres.

== Reception ==
Debolina Sen from The Times of India reviewed the film, giving it 2 out of 5 stars. She noted, "The film opens with a promise of good laughs. The song, along with the introduction, talks about various kinds of smiles that characterise people. By the time it ends, you are still looking for that highpoint."
