= Kharaj Mukherjee =

Bengali actor

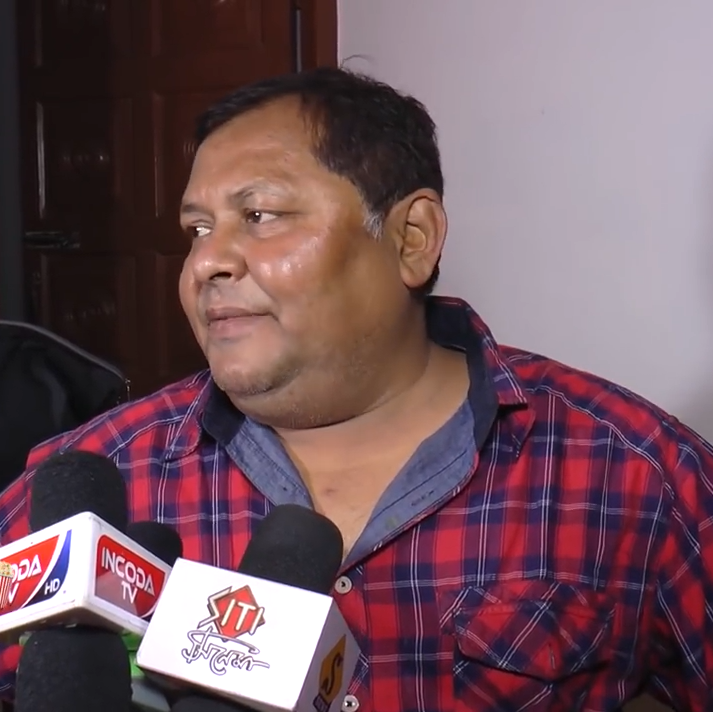
- Kharaj Mukherjee, in an interview, in 2018
- Born: 7 July 1963 (age 63); Rampurhat, Birbhum, West Bengal, India
- Other name: Kharaj Mukhopadhyay
- Occupations: Actor, Singer
- Known for: Acting and Singing
- Children: 1

Kharaj Mukherjee or Kharaj Mukhopadhyay is an Indian actor, comedian and singer. He won the Bengal Film Journalists' Association – Best Male Playback Award in 2004 for the film Patalghar. Over the years, he has established himself as one of the finest actors in the Bengali film industry due to his versatility in various roles.

== Career ==
He completed his education from St. Lawrence High School, Kolkata and completed his graduation in B.A from University of calcutta. Before starting his film career, he worked in the Indian Railways. He made his debut in Bengali film with the film Hulusthul in 1980. In the last 32 years, he has worked in many films like Patalghar, Bye Bye Bangkok, Kahani, Namesake, Accident, Muktodhara, Special 26, Lafangey Parindey, Yuva, Parineeta, Laga Chunari Mein Daag, Chha-e Chhuti, Jaatishwar etc. He is known for his excellence in both Commercial and natural acting. In 2012 film Kahaani, Mukherjee played the role of Inspector Chatterjee. His son, Bihu Mukherjee debuted in the film Abar Basanta Bilap.

== Filmography ==
Year	Films	Role	Language	Note
2026	Tonic 2		Bengali	
2026	Pratyabartan		Bengali	
2026	Phonibabu Viral		Bengali	
2025	Projapati 2		Bengali	
2025	Jolly LLB 3	DM Avik Sen gupta	Hindi	
2025	Jhumur		Bengali	
2024	Dabaru	A moneylender	Bengali	
2024	Boomerang	Chang Lee	Bengali	
2024	Shedin Kuasha Chilo		Bengali	
2023	Pradhan	opposition leader	Bengali	Mission Raniganj 2023 HINDI
2023	Sudama The Half Man	For Progga Mittir character actor and singer of the song	Bengali	Directed By Indo-Australian Film Director Rajib Ball
2023	Bogla Mama Jug Jug Jiyo	Bogla Mama	Bengali	
2023	Sudama Bahrupi Ka Kahani	Progga Mittir character	Hindi	Directed By Indo-Australian Film Director Rajib Ball
2023	Shibpur	Tapan	Bengali	
2023	Dilkhush	Shakti	Bengali	
2023	Manobjomin		Bengali	
2022	Projapoti		Bengali	
2022	Bhubanbabur Smart Phone	Police Officer Bhujanga Dutta	Bengali	Directed by Pranabes Chandra and Santanu Basu
2022	Belashuru	Jyotirmoy	Bengali	
2022	Raavan		Bengali	
2022	Lakadbaggha	Arjun's uncle	Hindi	
2022	Kishmish	Goblu Chatterjee	Bengali	
2022	8/12		Bengali	
2021	Habu Chandra Raja Gobu Chandra Montri	Gobu Chandra Montri	Bengali	
2021	Hiralal	Girish Chandra Ghosh	Bengali	
2020	Cholo Potol Tuli	Binod	Bengali	
2020	Tiki-Taka		Bengali	ZEE5
2019	Sweater	Tuku's father	Bengali	
2019	Durgeshgorer Guptodhon	Aparup Chanda (Apu da)	Bengali	
2018	Oskar	Fraud Director	Bengali	
2018	†Hullusthullu	TBA	Bengali	
2018	Rosogolla		Bengali	
2018	Haami	Councillor Dilip Rakshit	Bengali	
2018	Flat No 609		Bengali	
2018	Abar Basanta Bilap		Bengali	
2018	Rongberonger Korhi	Khagen Chandra Banerjee, Government Clerk	Bengali	
2018	Goyenda Tatar	Police Officer	Bengali	
2018	Hoichoi Unlimited	Bijon Chirimar	Bengali	
2018	Bhaijaan †	TBA	Bengali	
2018	Naqaab	Doctor	Bengali	Bangladesh and India Joint Film
2018	Dhadak	Sachin Bhowmick (Sachin Dada)	Hindi	
2018	The Blackbelt		Bengali	
2018	Chalbaaz		Bengali	Bangladesh India Join Film
2018	Nabajiban Bima Company †	TBA	Bengali	
2018	Inspector Notty K	Police Inspector	Bengali	
2018	Wrong Route	Bonny's uncle	Bengali	Released On 12 January 2018
2017	Curzoner Kalom	Manohar	Bengali	
2017	Dhimaner Dinkaal	Khoraj	Bengali	TV Series
2017	72 Ghanta	Pulin	Bengali	
2017	Anukul	Ratan	Hindi	TV Short Film
2017	Nabab	Abhay Mandal	Bengali	Bangladesh and India Join Film
2017	Comrade		Bengali	
2017	Boss 2 : Back To Rule	The Man	Bengali	
2017	Amar Aponjon		Bengali	
2017	Meri Pyaari Bindu	Over-Excited Relative	Hindi	
2017	61 Garpar Lane		Bengali	
2017	Tomake Chai		Bengali	
2017	Ei To Jeebon	Chaiwala Ratan	Bengali	
2016	Kahaani 2 : Durga Rani Singh	Inspector Pranab Halder	Hindi	
2016	Bidyesh : The Envy		Bengali	
2016	Binodaner Dui Adhyay		Bengali	
2016	Clapstick		Bengali	
2016	Haripada Bandala	Nandanal / Nandu	Bengali	
2016	Telephone		Bengali	
2016	Abhimaan	Dishani's Relative	Bengali	
2016	Love Express	Driver "Popu"	Bengali	Guest appearance
2016	Cholai	Bus Passenger	Bengali	
2016	Aguner Pakhi		Bengali	
2016	Chocolate		Bengali	
2016	Shikari	Teenkori	Bengali	Indo-Bangladesh joint production
2016	Kelor Kirti	Gadadhar / Dhanudhar	Bengali	
2016	Power	OC Bhajan Ghosh	Bengali	
2016	Ki Kore Toke Bolbo	Akaash's Neighbour	Bengali	
2016	Hero 420		Bengali	Indo-Bangladesh joint production
2016	Angaar	Tantrik	Bengali	Indo-Bangladesh joint production
2016	Rater Rajanigandha	Natabar	Bengali	
2015	Monchuri	Dharmadas Maharaj	Bengali	
2015	Black	Anwar	Bengali	
2015	Abby Sen	Hiran	Bengali	
2015	Not A Dirty Film	Astrologer	Bengali	
2015	Shudhu Tomari Jonyo	Kangsho	Bengali	
2015	Parbona Ami Chartey Tokey	Apu's Father	Bengali	
2015	Jamer Raja Dilo Bor	Yamraj 2	Bengali	
2015	Anubrata Bhalo Acho : And A Verse Called Life	Mr. Lahiri	Bengali	
2015	Bela Seshe	Jyotirmay	Bengali	
2015	Agnee 2	Hotel's Owner	Bengali	Indo-Bangladesh joint production
2015	Besh Korechi Prem Korechi	Nepal Das	Bengali	
2015	Jamai 420	Rajballabh, Joy's father	Bengali	
2015	Romeo vs Juliet	Daya	Bengali	Indo-Bangladesh joint production
2015	Lorai : Play To Live	Moktar Alam	Bengali	
2015	Herogiri	Buddhadeb "Malpu" / Maria's uncle	Bengali	
2014	Gangster King	Sushil	Bengali	
2014	Force		Bengali	
2014	Teenkahon	Radhanath	Bengali	
2014	Bindaas	Krishnachandra Singha	Bengali	
2014	Bonku Babu	Sir	Bengali	
2014	Ramdhanu – The Rainbow	Aakash Singhania	Bengali	
2014	Aami Shudhu Cheyechi Tomay	College Principal	Bengali	Indo-Bangladesh joint production
2014	Bachchan	Retired Colonel (Priya's father)	Bengali	
2014	Chirodini Tumi Je Amar 2	Police Inspector	Bengali	
2014	Janla Diye Bou Palalo		Bengali	
2014	Action	Choukidaar	Bengali	
2014	The Royal Bengal Tiger	M.C Pakrashi	Bengali	
2014	Jaatishwar	Bhola Moyra, Kabiyal Singer	Bengali	
2013	Hanuman.com	Police Inspector	Bengali	
2013	Ashchorjyo Prodeep	Haridas Pal	Bengali	
2013	Majnu	Artist	Bengali	
2013	Half Serious		Bengali	
2013	Antaraal		Bengali	
2013	Rangbaaz	Madhurima's Sequrity	Bengali	
2013	Khiladi	Dayasankar Bal/Aditya's Manegar	Bengali	
2013	Chupi Chupi		Bengali	
2013	Alik Sukh	Lawyer	Bengali	
2013	Golemale Pirit Koro Na	Jagannath	Bengali	
2013	Special 26	CBI Officer Roy (Calcutta Raid)	Hindi	
2012	Sudama The Half Man	Torjagayen Progga Mittir	Bengali	
2012	Tor Naam	Principal	Bengali	
2012	Accident	Madan Patra	Bengali	
2012	Challenge 2	Swarnakamal	Bengali	
2012	Muktodhara	Lakhan Panda	Bengali	
2012	Awara	Madan Mohan / Madan Da / Madna	Bengali	
2012	Le Halua Le		Bengali	
2012	Bhooter Bhabishyat	Pramod Pradhan	Bengali	
2012	Kahaani	Inspector Chatterjee	Hindi	
2012	Goraay Gondogol	runs a country liquor shop	Bengali	
2012	Paglu 2	Voice-over of Lord Shiva	Bengali	Voice Role
2011	Aami Montri Hobo	Kharaj	Bengali	
2011	Gosainbaganer Bhoot	Damodar Kaka	Bengali	
2011	Proloy Asche	Assistant Teacher	Bengali	
2011	Shatru	Bhajan Babu	Bengali	
2011	Bye Bye Bangkok	Milan Sadhukhan	Bengali	
2011	Katakuti	Patient at Asylum	Bengali	
2011	Egaro	Shrihari	Bengali	
2010	Dui Prithibi	Gopal's father	Bengali	
2010	Ogo Bodhu Sundari		Bengali	
2010	Le Chakka	Ismail Biriyaniola	Bengali	
2010	The Japanese Wife	Kite shop owner	Bengali	
2010	Wanted	Shibu's uncle	Bengali	
2010	Notobor Notout	Balai	Bengali	
2009	Chha-e Chhuti	Kharaj	Bengali	
2009	Dujone	Teacher	Bengali	
2009	Challenge	College Principal	Bengali	
2009	Dhakee		Bengali	
2009	Lakshyabhed	Harikaka	Bengali	
2009	Abelay Garam Bhaat	Badan Pramanick	Bengali	
2008	Partner	Gobardhan Ghoshal	Bengali	
2008	Cheenti Cheenti Bang Bang	Voice	Bengali	Voice Role
2008	Bhalobasha Bhalobasha		Bengali	
2008	Tolly Lights		Bengali	
2007	Prem		Bengali	
2006	Shikar	Ramu	Bengali	
2006	The Namesake	Chotu	English	
2005	Parineeta	Singer in Recording Studio (Male)	Hindi	
2005	Shunyo E Buke		Bengali	
2004	Parinam		Bengali	
2004	Swami Chinntai		Bengali	
	Neel Seemana	Billonath	Bengali	
2003	Patalghar	Subuddhi	Bengali	
2003	Uddhar		Bengali	
2003	Boumar Banabash		Bengali	
2002	Tak Jhal Mishti		Bengali	
2002	Deva		Bengali	
2001	Churiwala		Bengali	
1999	Ranga Bou		Bengali	
1984	Lattoo		Bengali	
1980	Hulusthul		Bengali	

=== Web series ===
- Kamini
- Rahasya Romancho
- Feluda Pherot
- Ray
- Byadh
- Feludar Goyendagiri: Bhuswargo Bhoyonkawr
