= Silajit Majumder =

Indian Bengali singer-songwriter and actor (born 1965)

- শিলাজিৎ মজুমদার
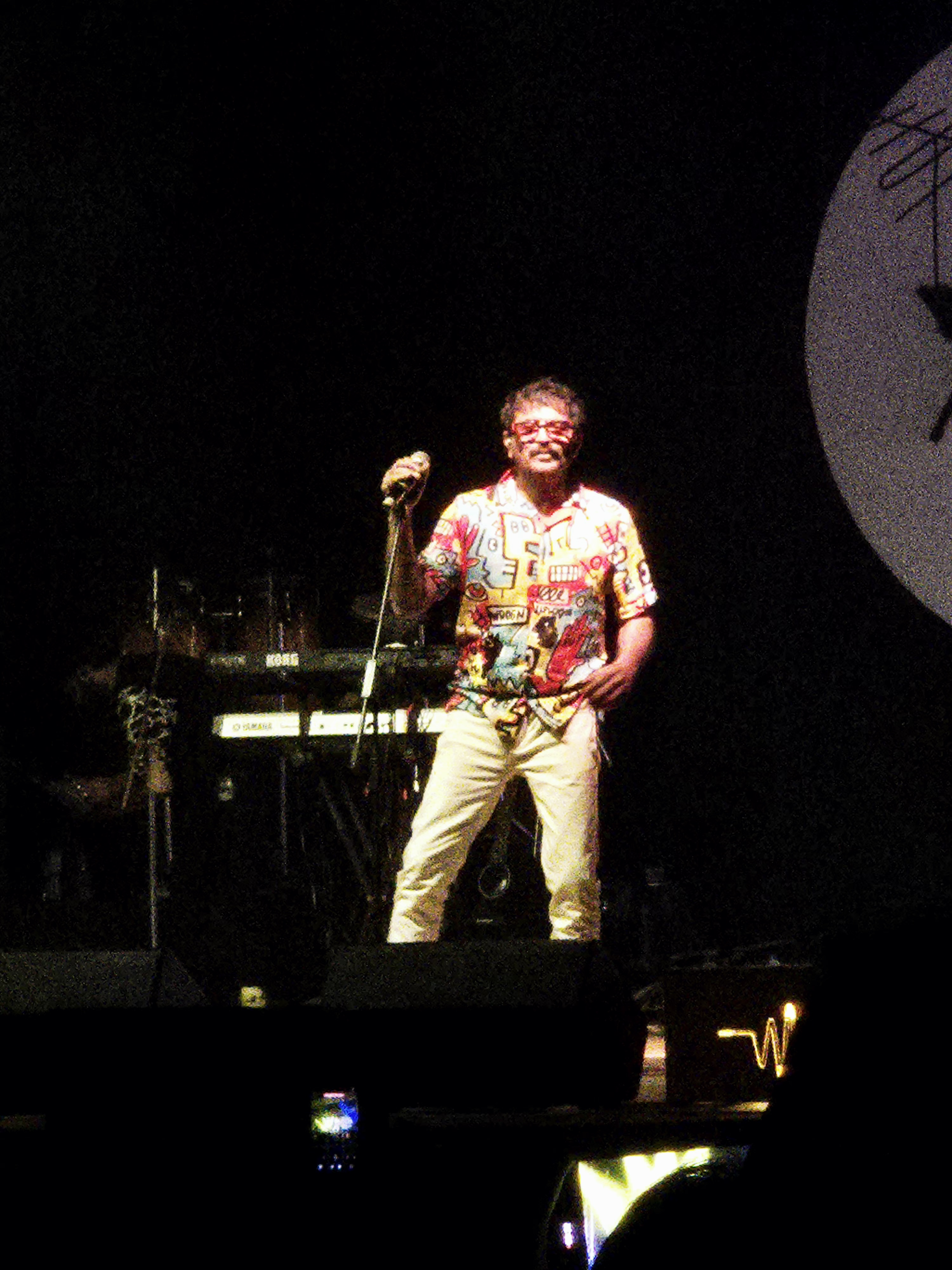
- Born: 9 October 1965 (age 60); Gargaria, Birbhum, West Bengal
- Education: Vidyasagar College
- Years active: 1994–present
- Spouse: Ilina
- Children: Dhee (son)
- Parents: Late Arun Majumder (father); Maya Majumder (mother)
- Relatives: Biswajit Majumder (brother)

Silajit Majumder (Bengali: শিলাজিৎ মজুমদার, born 9 October 1965), first name also spelled Shilajit, is an Indian Bengali singer-songwriter and actor from Kolkata. He is mostly credited by his first name. As an actor he is best known for his roles in films like Asukh (1999) by Rituparno Ghosh and Krantikaal (2005) by Sekhar Das. He was in Bigg Boss Bangla season 2.

== Education ==
Majumder received his education at the Saint Paul K G school, the Scottish Church Collegiate School, and before graduating from the Vidyasagar College of the University of Calcutta in English literature.

== Works ==
Studio Albums

- Bhoomika (1994)
- Amrao Benche Achhi (1995)
- Thik Ekhoni (1996)
- X=Prem (2000)
- Fisfis (2002)
- Lal Matir Sorane (2003)
- Rimjhim (2004)
- Sarbonaash (2008)
- Amra [Folk Rock] (2010)

Live

- X=2 Prem (2001)
- Ekta Raat (2007)

=== Music director ===
- Chupkatha (2012)
- Strugglers: The Reality Behind (2013)
- Manojder Adbhut Bari (2018)
- Bohurupi (2024)

=== Filmography ===
- Feraoikytpo
- Asukh (1999)
- Y2K (Athoba, 'Sex Krome Aasitechhe') (2000) as Heeru
- Sangee (2003) as Rana
- Prohor (2004)
- Mahulbanir Sereng (2004)
- Krantikal (2005)
- Ditiyo Basanto
- Tobu...Aste Hobe Fire (2006)
- Ram Balaram (2008)
- Chhoy-e Chhuti (2008)
- Tintorettor Jishu (2008)
- Gandu (2010)
- Bye Bye Bangkok (2011)
- Jiyo Kaka (2011)
- Katakuti (2011)
- Hemlock Society (2012) as Siddhartha Roy
- Chupkatha (2012)
- Half Serious (2013)
- Highway (2014)
- Amar Sahor (2016) (A cop)
- Otai Last MMS (2015) (Guest Appearance)
- Manojder Adbhut Bari (2018) as Dacoit leader
- Bhalo Maye Kharap Maye (2019) as Shabby
- Saat Number Shanatan Sanyal (2019)
- 12 Seconds (Short) (2021) as Debanjan Mitra
- Ajogyo (2024) as Raktim
- Bohurupi (2024) (Guest Appearance)
- Pratyabartan (2026)

=== TV ===
- "Big Boss Bangla Season 2" (2016)

=== Web series ===
- Roktopolash (2022) as Dipankar
- Six (2018) as Police officer

=== Books ===
- Praptomonoskoder Jonyo (Abhijan Publishers, 2007)
- Aneke Poreni (Abhijan Publishers, 2009)
- Hijibiji (Abhijan Publishers, 2010)
- Aneke Poreni 2 (Abhijan Publishers, 2011)
- Shobodo-Sharir (Abhijan Publishers, 2012)
- 36 ta Prem (Abhijan Publishers, 2012, written with Srijato & Kingshuk)

== Awards ==
- Filmfare Awards Bangla 2025 – Best Actor in a Supporting Role (Male) for Ajogyo (Shared with Sawon Chakraborty for Chaalchitra Ekhon)
