= Rajesh Sharma (actor) =

Indian film industry actor

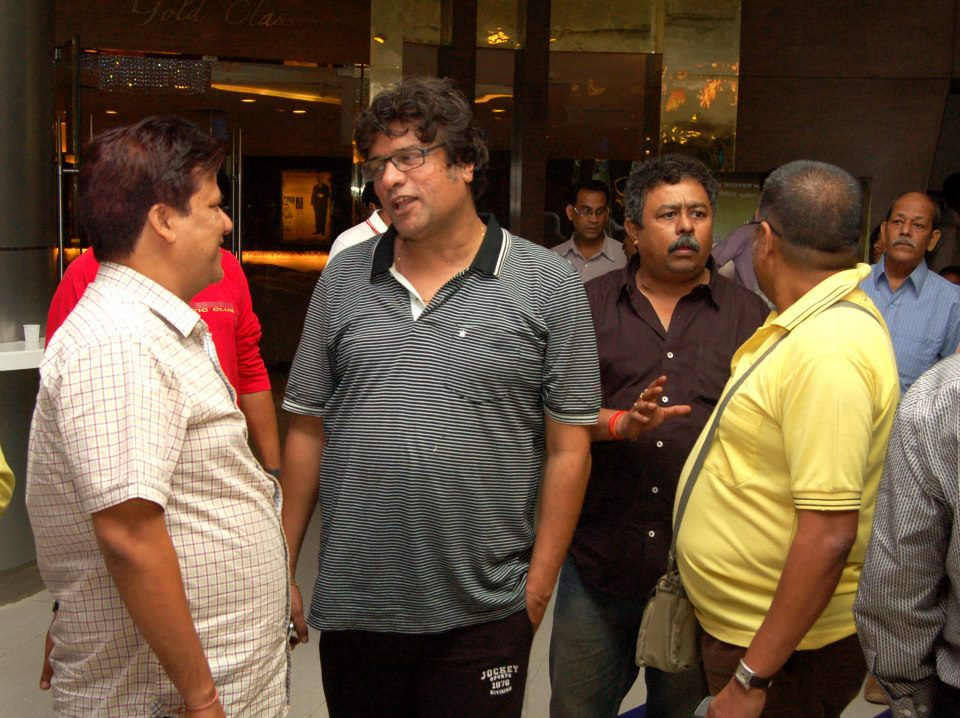
- Rajesh Sharma (center) at premiere of Bengali film Astra (2012)
- Born: 8 October 1970 (age 56); Ludhiana, Punjab, India
- Occupation: Actor
- Years active: 1990–present
- Spouses: Sudipta Chakraborty (m. 2000–2009) Sangeeta Sharma (m. 2011)

Rajesh Sharma is an Indian actor who acts in Hindi and Bengali films.

== Early life ==
He was born in Ludhiana, India and worked in Kolkata. There, he started acting in a theatre group named 'Rangakarmi' in Kolkata. He is an alumnus of the National School of Drama, New Delhi. Rajesh Sharma married Sudipta Chakraborty, a Bengali actress, and they later got divorced; he has been married to Sangeeta Sharma since 2011.

== Career ==
Rajesh Sharma made his Bollywood debut with the 1996 Hindi movie Maachis. After this, he started acting in Bengali films from the early 2000s. In Maachis, Rajesh Sharma co-starred with Chandrachur Singh, Jimmy Shergill, Raj Zutshi, Tabu and Om Puri. In 2000, he made a comeback in Bengali-film titled Paromitar Ek Din. It was written and directed by Aparna Sen. After acting in a few more Bengali films, he came back to Bollywood in 2005 with the film Parineeta. It was Vidya Balan's debut movie, where she acted against Saif Ali Khan.

Rajesh Sharma works mainly in the Bollywood and Bengali film industries. Sharma has appeared in Hindi films such as Khosla Ka Ghosla, Ishqiya, No One Killed Jessica, Chillar Party, The Dirty Picture, Luv Shuv Tey Chicken Khurana, Special 26, B.A. Pass, Tanu Weds Manu Returns, Bajrangi Bhaijaan, Toilet: Ek Prem Katha M. S. Dhoni: The Untold Story and India's Most Wanted.

== Filmography ==
Key
†	Denotes films that have not yet been released

=== Films ===
Year	Title	Character	Language	Ref.
1996	Maachis		Hindi	
2000	Paromitar Ek Din	Rajeev Shrivastav	Bengali	
2001	Dada Thakur	Jyotin Roy	Bengali	
2001	Pratibad	Tinu	Bengali	
2002	Sonar Sansar		Bengali	
2002	Sathi		Bengali	
2002	Desh		Bengali	
2002	Shubho Mahurat	Sunil	Bengali	
2003	Champion	Sports Coach	Bengali	
2003	Bombaiyer Bombete	Victor Perumal	Bengali	
2004	Badsha The King	Shaktinath	Bengali	
2004	Gyarakal	Chanu	Bengali	
2005	Parineeta	Ratan	Hindi	
2006	Agnishapath		Bengali	
2006	Khosla Ka Ghosla	Munjal	Hindi	
2006	Shikar	Police Officer Rajesh Yadav	Bengali	
2006	Kranti	Inspector Ranajoy	Bengali	
2006	Ghatak	Baba Sheikh	Bengali	
2007	Pagal Premi	Sibu	Bengali	
2007	Dus Din Pore	Deva	Bengali	
2007	Sakhi Rahila ae Singha Duara		Odia	
2008	Neel Rajar Deshe	Kidnapper	Bengali	
2009	Chha-e Chhuti	Rajesh Sharma (himself)	Bengali	
2010	Ishqiya	Kamalkant Kakkad aka KK	Hindi	
2011	No One Killed Jessica	N.K. (Cop)	Hindi	
2011	Bedeni		Bengali	
2011	Bye Bye Bangkok	Hotel Receptionist	Bengali	
2011	Oh My Love		Bengali	
2011	Paapi		Bengali	
2011	Punorutthan		Bengali	
2011	Bindas Prem		Bengali	
2011	Chillar Party	L. N. Tondon	Hindi	
2011	System		Bengali	
2011	Baishe Srabon	Amit Srivastav	Bengali	
2011	The Dirty Picture	Selva Ganesh	Hindi	
2012	Chaalis Chauraasi	Mahesh Naik	Hindi	
2012	Goraay Gondogol		Bengali	
2012	Laptop	Rakesh	Bengali	
2012	8:08 Er Bongaon Local	Shishir (Cop)	Bengali	
2012	Teen Yaari Katha	Sentu da	Bengali	
2012	Om Shanti	Manjil	Bengali	
2012	Life in Park Street		Bengali	
2012	Darling	Payel's Father	Bengali	
2012	Passport		Bengali	
2012	Astra	Inspector Sanyal	Bengali	
2012	Luv Shuv Tey Chicken Khurana	Tito Mama	Hindi	
2012	Strings Of Passion	Shekhar Banerjee	Hindi	
2013	Special 26	Joginder Khurana	Hindi	
2013	Kagojer Nouka	Arvind Singh	Bengali	
2013	Ghanchakkar	Panditt	Hindi	
2013	Ganesh Talkies		Bengali	
2013	B.A. Pass	Khanna	Hindi	
2013	Shuddh Desi Romance	Mausa Ji	Hindi	
2013	Mishawr Rawhoshyo	Narendra Verma	Bengali	
2013	Nirbhoya		Bengali	
2014	Pizza		Hindi	
2014	Strings of Passion		Hindi, Bengali	
2014	Pendulum	Builder	Bengali	
2014	The Xposé	Inspector Raj Grover	Hindi	
2014	Taan	Jahangir Sardar	Bengali	
2014	Ekkees Toppon Ki Salaami	Daya Shankar Pandey	Hindi	
2015	Tevar	Mahendar Singh	Hindi	
2015	Dolly Ki Doli	Ramesh Sherawat	Hindi	
2015	Tanu Weds Manu Returns	Om Prakash Saangwaan	Hindi	
2015	Bajrangi Bhaijaan	Hamid Khan	Hindi	
2015	Amanush 2	Inspector Tarafdar	Bengali	
2016	Palki	Wakil	Hindi	
2016	Azhar	M. K. Sharma	Hindi	
2016	M. S. Dhoni: The Untold Story	Keshav Banerjee (Dhoni's first coach)	Hindi	
2016	Bhawani Mandi	Virendar Singh Naruka	Hindi	
2016	Romantic Noy	Shekar's Boss	Bengali	
2016	Double Feluda	Mr. Sukhwani	Bengali	
2017	Begum Jaan	Shyam	Hindi	
2017	Hindi Medium	MLA	Hindi	
2017	Toilet: Ek Prem Katha	Mathur	Hindi	
2017	Lucknow Central	Pandit	Hindi	
2017	Panchlait	Mulgain	Hindi	
2017	Game Over	Rangeen Awasthi	Hindi	
2018	Nanu Ki Jaanu	Bhali	Hindi	
2018	Race 3	Brij Mohan (Brijesh)	Hindi	
2018	Yamla Pagla Deewana: Phir Se	Advocate Bhatia	Hindi	
2018	Tuski	Tuski's father	Bengali	
2018	Kelo	Dr Sen	Bengali	
2018	Golak Bugni Bank Te Batua	Money Exchanger	Punjabi	
2018	Kishore Kumar Junior	Firoz	Bengali	
2018	Dotara		Bengali	
2018	Vada Chennai	Chanchal	Tamil	
2018	FryDay	Inspector	Hindi	
2018	The Past	Guruji	Hindi	
2019	22 Yards	Ravi Khanna	Hindi	
2019	The Tashkent Files	Omkar Kashyap	Hindi	
2019	India's Most Wanted	Rajesh Singh	Hindi	
2019	Nakkash	Senior Inspector	Hindi	
2019	One Day: Justice Delivered	Pankaj Singh	Hindi	
2019	Super 30	Bachchi	Hindi	
2019	Kissebaaz	D. D. Shukla	Hindi	
2019	Batla House	Shailesh Arya	Hindi	
2019	Mardaani 2	Amit Sharma	Hindi	
2019	Purba Paschim Dakshin	Panditji	Bengali	
2019	Jhootha Kahin Ka	Goga (Varun's maternal uncle)	Hindi	
2019	Dream Girl	Mauji (W Ji)	Hindi	
2019	Dabangg 3	Minister S. S. Sharma	Hindi	
2019	Pati Patni Aur Woh	Prem Tripathi	Hindi	
2020	Laxmii	Sachin Rajput	Hindi	Disney Plus Hotstar film
2021	Kya Meri Sonam Gupta Bewafa Hai?	Travel Agent	Hindi	Zee5 film
2021	Bhavai	Bajrangi	Hindi	
2021	Dybbuk	Ezra's Dad	Hindi	Amazon Prime Video film
2022	Mere Desh Ki Dharti	Kishanlal	Hindi	
2022	Bhool Bhulaiyaa 2	Kulwant Thakur: Reet's uncle	Hindi	
2022	Ramrajya	M. P. Shukla	Hindi	
2022	Tadka	Bavarchi (cook)	Hindi	ZEE5 film
2022	Darlings	Kaseem	Hindi	Netflix film
2023	Mrs Undercover	Chief Rangeela	Hindi	Zee5 film
2023	U-Turn	HSP Saxena	Hindi	Zee5 film
2023	Chatrapathi	Kanthilal	Hindi	
2023	Minus 31: The Nagpur Files	Anupam Sharma	Hindi	
2023	Mission Raniganj	Govardhan Roy (MLA)	Hindi	
2024	Dard	Film Producer Shawkat	Bengali, Hindi	Multilingual film; India Bangladesh joint venture; Pan-Indian film
2024	Tauba Tera Jalwa	Professor	Hindi	
2024	Aakhir Palaayan Kab Tak	Sunil	Hindi	
2024	IRah	Dhananjay	Hindi	
2024	Crew	Prithviraj Mittal	Hindi	
2024	Wild Wild Punjab	SHO Avtar Singh	Hindi	
2024	Pad Gaye Pange	Shastri	Hindi	
2024	Navras Katha Collage	superstar	Hindi	
2024	Kahan Shuru Kahan Khatam	Sumer Singh Chaudhary	Hindi	
2024	Bhool Bhulaiyaa 3	Meera's uncle	Hindi	
2025	Mission Grey House	Yashpal Singh	Hindi	
2025	Badass Ravi Kumar	Jagarwar Choudhary	Hindi	
2026	Bhooth Bangla	Dushund Acharya	Hindi	
2026	Krishnavataram Part 1: The Heart (Hridayam)	Akrura, Krishna's uncle	Hindi	
2026	Peddi	Indian Government Official	Telugu	
2026	Aryabhatt Ka Zero	Tyagi Ji	Hindi	
2026	Jailer 2	Inspector Vikram Deshpande	Tamil	
2027	Khosla Ka Ghosla 2	Munjal	Hindi	

=== Web series ===
Year	Title	Role	Language	Platform	Notes
2018	Life Sahi Hai	Maid agency owner	Hindi	ZEE5	
2020	Kark Rogue	Ravikant Agarwal	Bengali, Hindi	ZEE5	
2020	Paatal Lok	Tycoon Gwala Gurjer	Hindi	Amazon Prime Video	
2020	JL50	Gaurango	Hindi	Sony LIV	
2021	Matsya Kaand	Soori	Hindi	MX Player	
2021	Ray	Suresh Sharma	Hindi	Netflix	
2022	Online 24x7	Mr. Patel	Hindi		
2022	Amit Bhadana LL.B	Advocate Mehta	Hindi	YouTube	
2023	NH6	Inspector	Bengali	Klikk	
2026	Hunkkaar	Dharampal Rawat	Hindi	Jio Hotstar	
