= Kanchana Moitra =

Indian film actress and politician

- Born: West Bengal, India
- Occupations: Actress; Politician
- Years active: 2008–present
- Political party: Bharatiya Janata Party (2019–2023)

Kanchanaa Moitra is an Indian actress and politician who works primarily in the Bengali cinema and television.

== Acting career ==
Moitra acted in 2008 Bengali film Sedin Dujone directed by Atanu Bose, but she came into prominence after her 2011 film Bye Bye Bangkok. In 2012 she acted in a few more films like Kayekti Meyer Golpo of Subrata Sen, Accident directed by Nandita Roy and Shiboprosad Mukherjee.

== Political career ==
In 2019 she joined the Bharatiya Janata Party along with several Tollywood actors. She quit the party in 2023 to devote time to acting career and family.

== Filmography ==
=== Films ===
Year	Film
2004	Agni
2008	Sedin Dujone
2009	Pakhi
2011	Bye Bye Bangkok
2012	8:08 Er Bongaon Local
2012	Kayekti Meyer Golpo
2012	Accident
2013	Bristi Bheja Roddur
2013	Mahapurush O Kapurush
2014	10th July
2014	Pati Parameshwar
2015	Shajarur Kanta
2015	Natoker Moto
2016	Kiriti Roy
2017	Bilu Rakkhosh
2017	Guha Manab
2019	Jaanbaaz
2020	Rawkto Rawhoshyo
2024	Abar Asibo Firey
2024	Bohurupi
2025	Ami Jokhon Hema Malini
2025	Kapal
2026	Bhanupriya Bhooter Hotel

=== Television ===
Year	Serial	Channel	Character	Production
2013– 2014	Sokhi	Star Jalsha	Minakshi	Ravi Ojha Production
2014–2016	Kiranmala	Star Jalsha	Suroshini	Surinder Films
2015– 2016	Tumi Robe Nirobe	Zee Bangla	Roti Roy	Blues Productions
2016	Byomkesh	Colors Bangla	Malati	Daag Creative Media
2016	Premer Phaande	Zee Bangla	Shiuli Ganguly	Ravi Ojha Production
2016– 2017	Bene Bou	Colors Bangla	Ajanta	Blues Productions
2016– 2017	Jarowar Jhumko	Zee Bangla	Ellora Roy	Blues Productions
2017–2018	Bhojo Gobindo	Star Jalsha	Neepa	Blues Productions
2018–2020	Hriday Haran B.A. Pass	Zee Bangla	Bina	Blues Productions
2019–2021	Saanjher Baati	Star Jalsha	Jhumpa	Acropoliis Entertainment
2020	Bagh Bondi Khela	Zee Bangla	Raya's aunt	Shree Venkatesh Films
2020–2022	Jamuna Dhaki	Zee Bangla	Ragini Chowdhury	Blues Productions
2021–2022	Khukumoni Home Delivery	Star Jalsha	Nipa Deb	Blues Productions
2022	Madhabilata	Star Jalsha	Sabuj's aunt	Blues Productions
2022–2025	Jagaddhatri	Zee Bangla	Shakuntala Sanyal	Blues Productions
2023–2024	Phaguner Mohona	Sun Bangla	Rumjhum's aunt	Friends Communication
2023	Mukut	Zee Bangla	Jayati Sarkar	Blues Productions
2023–2025	Geeta L.L.B.	Star Jalsha	Jagriti Mukherjee	Blues Productions
2025–Present	O Mor Dorodiya	Star Jalsha		Surinder Flims
2026	Anondi	Zee Bangla		Nini Chini's Mamma's Production

== See also ==
- Rupanjana Mitra
- Anjana Basu
- Debolina Dutta
