= Aniket Chattopadhyay =

Indian journalist and film director

- Born: 9 January 1963 (age 63); Kolkata, West Bengal, India
- Occupations: Film director, journalist
- Years active: 2010–present
- Spouse: Sahana

Aniket Chattopadhyay (born 9 January 1963) is an Indian journalist and film director in Bengali cinema. He has directed the films, Chha-e Chhuti (2009), Bye Bye Bangkok (2011), the romantic comedy film Goraay Gondogol (2012), Mahapurush O Kapurush (2013), Janala Diye Bou Palalo (2014), Room No. 103 (2015), Shankar Mudi (2019), and Kabir (2018). He was also the news editor of Bengali news channel Kolkata TV.

== Filmography ==
- Chha-e Chhuti (2009)
- Bye Bye Bangkok (2011)
- Goraay Gondogol (2012)
- Mahapurush O Kapurush (2013)
- Janala Diye Bou Palalo (2014)
- Room No. 103 (2015)
- Kiriti Roy (2016 film)
- Kabir (2018)
- Hoichoi Unlimited (2018)
- Tuski (2018)
- Shankar Mudi (2019)
- Hobu Chandra Raja Gobu Chandra Mantri (2021)
