= Anjana Basu =

Indian television actress (born 1973)

President of BJP Mahila Morcha, West Bengal
- Incumbent
- Assumed office 25 September 2026
- Preceded by: Phalguni Patra

Personal details
- Born: Howrah, West Bengal, India
- Party: Bharatiya Janata Party (2019–present)
- Occupation: Actress; Politician

Anjana Basu is an Indian actress and politician who works in Bengali films and television. She started her acting career with modelling, and gradually with a serial "Robir Aloy" which aired on Alpha Bangla (presently known as Zee Bangla), she came into the limelight. The year was 2003. In 2005, she was a part of a horror film, Raat Barota Panch.

She has appeared in Aniket Chattopadhyay's Chha-e Chhuti and Bye Bye Bangkok. She has also worked in television mega-serials like Gaaner Oparey, Shonar Horin, Debdas, Bidhir Bidhan, Bodhuboron etc. Anjana has worked with Amol Palekar in Krishnakali.

== Early life ==
Anjana spent her childhood in a joint family in Howrah in West Bengal. Her father didn't want her to come into theater or acting, and thus she concentrated in her studies. She was trained in Bharatnatyam as a child. Her father was a member of an amateur theater group. She studied in Howrah Girls' School and pursued Psychology from Bijoy Krishna Girls' College. After completing her graduation she got admitted to Rajabazar Science College, for post graduation, but could not complete her studies. She got married and moved to Patna. Later she came back to Kolkata and since then, took acting as her career.

== Acting career ==
She rose to fame with the Hindi serial Krishnakali, which was directed by Amol Palekar, based on a story by Shivani. She played an important character in Amol Palekar's film Dum Kata. In 2007 or 2008, she starred in a telefilm Parokiya, directed by Atanu Ghosh. She joined in BJP in 2019.

== Political career ==
Basu joined the BJP in 2019. She contested for the party in the Sonarpur Dakshin seat in the 2021 West Bengal Legislative Assembly election but lost to fellow actress-politician Arundhuti Maitra.

On 25 September 2026, Basu became the BJP Mahila Morcha president of West Bengal succeeding Phalguni Patra.

== Filmography ==
- Raat Barota Panch (2005)
- Dum Kata (2007)
- Jara Bristite Bhijechhilo (2007)
- Angshumaner Chhobi (2009)
- Eka Eka (2009)
- Durga (2009) (unreleased)
- Chha-e Chhuti (2009)
- Ghar Sansar (2010)
- Bye Bye Bangkok (2011)
- Laptop (2012)
- Room No. 103 (2015)
- Adbhut (2013)
- Byomkesh Phire Elo (2014)
- Durbin (2014)
- Abar Boshonto (2014) (unreleased)
- Pakaram (2015)
- Abhimaan
- Dwikhondito
- Ragini
- Kishmish (2022)
- Aparajito (2022)
- Palasher Biye (2024)
- Fasco (2024)
- Shreeman v/s Shreemati (2025)
- Haati Haati Paa Paa (2025)

== Television ==
- Robir Aloy (2003) aired on Zee Bangla
- Gaaner Oparey (2010–2011)as Shatarupa Deb (Rupa) aired on Star Jalsha
- Alpona, aired on Mahuaa Bangla
- Krishnakali, aired on DD National
- Bhalobasha.com aired on Star Jalsha
- Durgeshnandinii aired on Colors Bangla
- Bhasha aired on Star Jalsha
- Prabahini Ei Shomoy aired on Akash Aath
- Ashambhab aired on Zee Bangla
- Jagaran aired on DD Bangla
- Ghorer Bhitor Jhor aired on Colors Bangla
- Bidhir Bidhan, as Rudrani Maa (2012-2013), aired on Star Jalsha
- Bodhuboron as Indira Chowdhury, aired on Star Jalsha
- Bijoyinee as Subarna, aired on Star Jalsha
- Mon Mane Na as Rajani "Boro Ma" aired on Colors Bangla
- Pilu as Rijula Mukhopadhyay aired on Zee Bangla
- Roopsagore Moner Manush as Anasuya aired on Sun Bangla
- Uraan as Purnima aired on Star Jalsha (2024-2025)
- Kusum as Indrani Ganguly (2025-Present) aired on Zee Bangla

== Telefilms ==
- Parokiya (2000) (directed by Atanu Ghosh), aired on Tara Muzik
- Jhumuria (2008) (directed by Abhijit Dasgupta) aired on Tara Muzik
- Dadi
- Dark room
- Tutul aired on Tara Muzik
- Bhuturiar Bhutera
- Lobon Joler shira
- Shopno Shishu
- Je Jekhane Darie aired on Tara Muzik
- Fire dekha
- Akmutho kash ful aired on Akash Aath
- Dinante
- Odbhoot Noksha aired on Tara Muzik

== Awards ==
Year	Award	Category	Character	Film/TV show
2013	Star Jalsha Parivaar Awards 2013	Sera Khalnayika	Rudrani Maa	Bidhir Bidhan
2014	Star Jalsha Parivaar Awards 2014	Priyo Sashuri	Indira	Bodhuboron
2015	Star Jalsha Parivaar Awards 2015	Priyo Maa	Indira	Bodhuboron
2016	Star Jalsha Parivaar Awards 2016	Priyo Maa	Indira	Bodhuboron
2026	Zee Bangla Sonar Sansar Awards 2026	Priyo Sashuri	Indrani	Kusum
