= Bye Bye Bangkok =

2011 Indian Bengali film

- Release poster
- Directed by: Aniket Chattopadhyay
- Written by: Aniket Chattopadhyay
- Produced by: R. P. Techvision (India) Pvt. Ltd.
- Starring: Swastika Mukherjee; Locket Chatterjee; Kanchan Mullick; Silajit Majumder; Rudranil Ghosh; Rajesh Sharma; Sonali Chowdhury; Biswajit Chakraborty
- Cinematography: Premendu Bikash Chaki
- Edited by: Rabiranjan Maitra
- Music by: Gautam Ghoshal & Brahmakhyapa
- Production company: Md Mizanur Rahman BD
- Release date: 28 January 2011
- Country: India
- Language: Bengali

Bye Bye Bangkok is a 2011 Bengali comedy drama film, directed by Aniket Chattopadhyay.

The film was shot in Bangkok and Kolkata.

== Plot ==
Avijit Banerjee runs his own software company. His secretary who is completely absent minded and has got a terrible memory always goes with him wherever he goes. His wife Anwesha and her driver plan to go abroad thanks to Anwesha.Anirban, an ad filmmaker dreams of becoming a filmmaker. Aparajita, his wife who is a professor of philosophy doesn't like his lifestyle. Milon deals in real estate and his wife Pritha who runs a non-governmental organization always dreams of getting awards without doing anything. Priyatosh is a salesman of biscuits and his wife Nandita models for ad films. Most of them are going with each other's husband/wife without any of them knowing each other and somehow they all land up in Bangkok and even stay in the same hotel. A series of hilarious events occur and one particular event brings all of them together. They all blame Sadhu Charan as the main reason behind all this and they leave him and Avijit's secretary in Bangkok and go back.

== Cast ==
- Neel Mukherjee as Avijit Banerjee
- Silajit Majumder as Anirban Bose
- Rudranil Ghosh as Sadhucharan Das
- Kharaj Mukherjee as Milan Sadhukhan
- Swastika Mukherjee as Tanima
- Locket Chatterjee as Anwesha Banerjee
- Anjana Basu as Aparajita Bose
- Kanchan Mallick as Priyotosh Bagchi
- Rajesh Sharma as Hotel Receptionist
- Sonali Chowdhury as Pritha Sadhukhan
- Kanchana Moitra as Nandita Bagchi
- Rajatava Dutta as Rajatava Dutta (special appearance)
- Arindol Bagchi as Boss of Biscuit Company
- Sudipa Basu
- Biswajit Chakraborty as Head of Travel Agency
