= Tope (film) =

2016 Bengali film

- Film poster
- Directed by: Buddhadeb Dasgupta
- Written by: Buddhadeb Dasgupta
- Produced by: Pawan Kanodia
- Cinematography: Asim Bose
- Edited by: Amitava Dasgupta
- Music by: Alokananda Dasgupta
- Distributed by: Netflix
- Release date: September 2016 (TIFF)
- Country: India
- Language: Bengali

Tope (lit. 'The Bait') is a 2016 Indian Bengali-language psychological drama film directed by Buddhadeb Dasgupta and produced by Pawan Kanodia. The film is based on a same name short story of Narayan Gangopadhyay. The film premiered at the 2016 Toronto International Film Festival and was released on 5 May 2017 under the banner of Ava Film Productions Pvt. Ltd.

== Plot ==
The plot revolves around three parallel stories in the style of magic realism. There is an eccentric King of rural India who can go to any extent to fulfill his dreadful wishes. Munni, a teenage girl and tightrope walker, lives with her mother. Goja, the postman who lives in jungle and suffers from meaninglessness of life.

== Cast ==
- Ananya Chatterjee as Rekha
- Paoli Dam as Munni's mother
- Sudipto Chatterjee as King
- Kajol Kumari as Munni
- Chandan Roy Sanyal as Goja
- Krishnendu Adhikari
- Eshika Dey
