= Tik Tik Tik =

Tik Tik Tik may refer to:

- Tik Tik Tik (1981 film), an Indian Tamil-language crime-mystery film
- Tik Tik Tik (2018 film), an Indian Tamil-language science fiction film

== See also ==
- Tiktiki, an Indian Bengali-language web series
