= Anirban Bhattacharya =

Indian Bengali stage and film actor

- Pronunciation: [oniɾban bʱɔʈːat͡ʃaɾd͡ʒo]
- Born: অনির্বাণ ভট্টাচার্য্য; 7 October 1986 (age 40); Midnapore, West Bengal, India
- Occupations: Theatre artist; Actor; Screenplay writer; Singer; Director
- Years active: 2010–present
- Notable work: Eagoler Chokh; Arshinagar; Colkatay Columbus; Dhananjay; Debi Sarpamasta; Awdyo Shesh Rajani; Athoi, Ek Je Chhilo Raja; Gumnaami; Dwitiyo Purush; Ballabhpurer Roopkotha
- Height: 6 ft 1 in (185 cm)
- Spouse: Madhurima Goswami (m. 2020)

Anirban Bhattacharya (Note: Bengali pronunciation: [oniɾban bʱɔʈːat͡ʃaɾd͡ʒo].) (Bengali pronunciation: [oniɾban bʱɔʈːat͡ʃaɾd͡ʒo]; born 7 October 1986) is an Indian actor, singer, director, composer, lyricist, voice artist and author. Bhattyacharya won ABP Ananda Sera Bangali Award in 2022. In 2017, Bhattacharya won WBFJA Awards for Best Promising Actor of The Year.

== Career ==
His first successful theatre production was Debi Sarpamasta, written by Manoj Mitra, directed by Debesh Chattopadhyay. His other notable works are Anthony Soudamini, Nagamandala (famous play by Girish Karnad), Jara Agun Lagay, Bisorjan, FM Mahanagar, Karu Basana, Awdyo Shesh Rajani, Athoi etc. In 2017, he got the Mahindra Excellence Theatre Awards (META) as Best Actor in a Leading Role (Male) for Awdyo Shesh Rajani.

In 2015, he started his film career with the Zee Bangla telefilm Kader Kuler Bou. He got fame for his character as Bishan Roy from the film Eagoler Chokh. For playing this role, he was picked up as the Filmfare Awards East for Best Actor in a Supporting Role in 2017. In 2019, He got his first Best Actor Award for the role of Nikhilesh Chowdhury from the movie Ghawre Bairey Aaj which was immensely praised by critics and audiences. He made his directorial debut through the Bengali crime drama web series Mandaar, which is inspired by William Shakespeare's Macbeth. His second direction Ballavpurer Roopkotha was released on 21 October 2022. Calcutta Times has voted him as one of the top 10 Most Desirable Men in 2017.

== Controversies ==
After Anirban Bhattacharya and other directors mounted a legal battle against Swarup Biswas led Federation of Cine Technicians & Workers of Eastern India (FCTWEI), he has been facing an unofficial ban or work boycott.

== Early life ==
Anirban Bhattacharya was born on 7 October 1986 in Midnapore, West Bengal. He did his schooling from Nirmal Hriday Ashram Catholic Church High School in Midnapore. After that, in 2004 he moved to Kolkata to study theatre from Rabindra Bharati University. He completed his Master's in drama and received the Young Artist Scholarship in 2009 from the cultural ministry of the Government of India. His acting is highly influenced by Anjan Dutt.

== Filmography ==
Bhattacharya started his career in Bengali language films in 2015 with Zee Bangla Cinema Originals such as Kader Kuler Bou, Jodi Balo Hyan and Ebhabeo Phire Asa Jay. He hit the big screen in Aparna Sen's Arshinagar in a supporting role. In 2016, he appeared in Arindam Sil's Eagoler Chokh portraying a different character named "Bishan Roy" and was appreciated for his performance. He received the BFJA Most Promising Actor Male award and the Filmfare Awards East for the Best Actor in a Supporting Role for essaying Bishan Roy in that film. Bhattacharya was awarded with the Best Debutant Actor award at the International Bengali Film Award (IBFA). He played the role of a radio jockey in Colkatay Columbus. He was awarded the Ajeyo Samman 2017 by the newspaper Ebela for becoming the most praised actor in 2016.

Key
| † | Denotes films that have not yet been released |

=== As an Actor ===
| Year | Film | Director | Character | Note |
|---|---|---|---|---|
| 2013 | Kolkata-r King (Based on Three Penny Opera) | Judhajit Sarkar | King/KK | |
| 2015 | Kader Kuler Bou | Souvik Kundu | Kanad Brahma | |
| 2015 | Jodi Bolo Hyan | Abhijit Guha and Sudeshna Roy | Sayan Sen | |
| 2015 | Ebhabeo Fire Asha Jaye | Abhijit Guha and Sudeshna Roy | Kaushik Dutta | |
| 2015 | Arshinagar | Aparna Sen | Monty | Breakthrough film |
| 2016 | Eagoler Chokh | Arindam Sil | Bishan Roy | |
| 2016 | Colkatay Columbus | Saurav Palodhi | Sam | |
| 2017 | Durga Sohay | Arindam Sil | Madhab | |
| 2017 | Dhananjay | Arindam Sil | Dhananjoy | Based on real court case |
| 2017 | Ghya Chang Fou | Joyraj Bhattacharya | | |
| 2018 | Jojo | Argha Deep Chatterjee | Anirban | |
| 2018 | Alinagarer Golokdhadha | Sayantan Ghosal | Soham | |
| 2018 | Laboratory | Soumik Chattopadhyay | Reboti Bhattacharya | |
| 2018 | Uma | Srijit Mukherji | Mohitosh Sur | First collaboration with Srijit Mukherji |
| 2018 | Ek Je Chhilo Raja | Srijit Mukherji | Satya Banerjee | Second collaboration with Srijit Mukherji, based on real events |
| 2019 | Shahjahan Regency | Srijit Mukherji | Arnab Sarkar | based on Shankar's novel |
| 2019 | Finally Bhalobasha | Anjan Dutta | Joy | Anthology film |
| 2019 | Vinci Da | Srijit Mukherji | DCDD Bijoy Poddar | First appearance as Bijoy Poddar, first appearance in Srijit Mukherji's Cop Universe |
| 2019 | Bibaho Obhijaan | Birsa Dasgupta | Gonsha/Bullet Singh | |
| 2019 | Gumnaami | Srijit Mukherji | Chandrachur Dhar | Based on real events |
| 2019 | Ghawre Bairey Aaj | Aparna Sen | Nikhilesh Choudhury | Based on Rabindranath Tagore's novel |
| 2020 | Dwitiyo Purush | Srijit Mukherji | Khoka | Second appearance in Srijit Mukherji's Cop Universe |
| 2020 | Detective | Joydeep Mukherjee | Mahimchandra | Based on Rabindranath Tagore's short story |
| 2020 | Dracula Sir | Debaloy Bhattacharya | Raktim aka Dracula Sir | |
| 2021 | Mukhosh | Birsa Dasgupta | Kingshuk | Remake of Anjaam Pathira |
| 2021 | Golondaaj | Dhrubo Banerjee | Bhargav | |
| 2022 | Ballabhpurer Roopkotha | Himself | Himself | Directorial debut, cameo appearance in mid-credits scene, also lyricist, based on Badal Sarkar's drama |
| 2023 | Mitthye Premer Gaan | Paroma Neotia | Abhik | |
| 2023 | Mrs. Chatterjee vs Norway | Ashima Chibber | Aniruddha Chatterjee | Bollywood debut |
| 2023 | Abar Bibaho Obhijaan | Soumik Haldar | Gonsha | |
| 2023 | Dawshom Awbotaar | Srijit Mukherji | Bijoy Poddar | Second appearance as Bijoy Poddar, Third appearance in Srijit Mukherji's Cop Universe |
| 2024 | Athhoi | Arna Mukhopadhyay | Dr. Anarghya Chatterjee aka Gogo | Based on William Shakespeare's Othello, also creative director and lyricist |
| 2025 | Pokkhirajer Dim | Soukarya Ghosal | Batabyal Sir | Sequel to Rainbow Jelly |
| 2025 | Raghu Dakat | Dhrubo Banerjee | Ahindra Barman | |
| 2026 | Naye Naye Taare | Anand Kumar | | Short film on YouTube |
| 2026 | DeSu7 † | Dev | | |
| 2026 | Birpurush † | Raajhorshee De | | |
| 2027 | Tarpor | Kaushik Ganguly | | |
| 2027 | Chor Police Dakat Babu † | Nirjhar Mitra | | |

=== As a Director ===
==== Web Series ====
| Year | Web Series | Other Roles | Notes |
|---|---|---|---|
| 2021 | Mandaar | Actor | Based on William Shakespeare's Macbeth |

==== Films ====
| Year | Film | Other Roles | Notes |
|---|---|---|---|
| 2022 | Ballabhpurer Roopkotha | Singer, lyricist | Based on Badal Sarkar's play of the same name |

==== Music Videos ====
| Year | Song | Film/Album | Singer(s) | Composer(s) | Lyricist(s) | Notes |
|---|---|---|---|---|---|---|
| 2023 | Dana Kata Pori | Indubala Bhaater Hotel | Anirban Bhattacharya | Amit Chatterjee | Debaloy Bhattacharya | Music Video |
| 2025 | Pujar Gaan | | Subhadeep Guha, Debraj Bhattacharya, Anirban Bhattacharya | Subhadeep Guha, Anirban Bhattacharya, Gopinath Murmu | Subhadeep Guha, Debraj Bhattacharya, Anirban Bhattacharya, Gopinath Murmu | |
| 2025 | Bodlabe Gotipath | | Subhadeep Guha | Subhadeep Guha | Subhadeep Guha | |
| 2026 | Prithibita Bhalo Lokeder Noy | | Anirban Bhattacharya, Debraj Bhattacharya, Subhadeep Guha | Anirban Bhattacharya, Subhadeep Guha | Anirban Bhattacharya | |
| 2026 | Ek Minute Er Chumu | | Debraj Bhattacharya | Debraj Bhattacharya, Subhadeep Guha, Anirban Bhattacharya | Anirban Bhattacharya | |
| 2026 | Bishader Gaan | | Anirban Bhattacharya, Debraj Bhattacharya, Subhadeep Guha | Anirban Bhattacharya, Subhadeep Guha, Debraj Bhattacharya | Anirban Bhattacharya, Promita Bhattacharya | |

== Bibliography ==
- Karubashonaye (2026)

== Theatre ==
He acted in various theater productions between 2005 and 2010. In 2008, Bhattacharya acted in the workshop based theatre production Jhunki (The Risk), conducted by Steve Clorfiene, student of Yergi Grotowski. It was a collaboration of American Council and Rabindra Bharati University. He acted in three productions like Raja Lear, Debi Sarpomosta and Chandragupta. He resigned from Minerva Repertoire in January 2013 and started his career as a professional freelance theatre actor.

In 2010, he formed his theatre group, Sangharam Hatibagan. He directed Guru, Chowmatha, Udorniti (a short play translated from the play Out at Sea by Slawomir Mrozek ), Pontu Laha 2.0 (an adaptation of the play Mr Puntila and his Man Matti by Bertolt Brecht), and Mondar (an adaptation of William Shakespeare's Macbeth).

| Year | Play | Director | Role |
|---|---|---|---|
| 2005 | Bijalibala-r Mukti | Adrija Dasgupta | Narrator |
| 2007 | Tumi Dak Diyechho Kon Shokale | Adrija Dasgupta | Multiple Characters |
| 2007 | Dure Baje (Based on Pracheta Gupta's short story) | Adrija Dasgupta | Narrator |
| 2008 | Shilpi | Adrija Dasgupta | Madan Tanti |
| 2009 | Amar Atmahatya Kalin Jabanbandi | Adrija Dasgupta | Multiple Characters |
| 2010 | Raja Lear (Shakespeare's King Lear) | Suman Mukhopadhyay | Edmund |
| 2011 | Debi Sarpamasta (Manoj Mitra) | Debesh Chattopadhyay | Narrator and Raja Lokendra Pratap |
| 2012 | Chandragupta | Kaushik Chattopadhyay | Raja Nanda |
| 2013 | Tin Kanya | Abanti Chakraborty | Andrei |
| 2013 | Anthony Soudamini | Soumitra Mitra | Anthony |
| 2013 | Nagamandala (By Girish Karnad) | Abanti Chakraborty | Naga & Apanna |
| 2013 | Tin Poishar Pala | Tathagata Choudhury | Mohin Dakat |
| 2014 | Jara Agun Lagay | Suman Mukhopadhyay | Gotlip Beiddermann |
| 2014 | Bisarjan (Rabindranath Tagore's Play) | Suman Mukhopadhyay | Raja Gobinda Manikya |
| 2014 | Troy (Based on the Iliad by Homer) | Abanti Chakraborty | Hector |
| 2014 | Chhayabaji | Chandan Sen | Chhaya (Shadow) |
| 2015 | Icchher Oli Goli | Abanti Chakraborty | Stanley Kowalski |
| 2015 | FM Mahanagar | Arindam Mukherjee | Abhra |
| 2015 | Karu Basana (Based on a novel by Jibananda Das) | Arpita Ghosh, Debesh Chattopadhyay | Hem |
| 2016 | Awdyo Shesh Rajani | Bratya Basu | Amiya Chakraborty |
| 2016 | Athoi (Based on Shakespeare's Othello) | Arna Mukhopadhyay | Anagro (Based on Iago) |
| 2019 | Titumir | Joyraj Bhattacharjee | Titumir |
| 2019 | Pontu Laha 2.0 | Anirban Bhattacharya | Junior Shakil Ansari |
| 2021 | Mephisto | Suman Mukhopadhyay | Hendrik Höfgen |
| 2022 | Ghore Baire | Arpita Ghosh | |

== Television ==
Anirban has worked in a non-fictional television comedy show Apur Sangsar, along with Saswata Chatterjee, which has started to air on Zee Bangla from 26 January. He has appeared in popular shows of Zee Bangla like Didi No. 1 as guest and Dadagiri Unlimited Season 7 as celebrity contestant. The play Awdyo Shesh Rajni (Anirban as lead) was aired on Home Theatre of Colors Bangla. He hosted a crime show Hushiar Bangla on Colors Bangla.

Anirban has now starred in a limited television series Bhoomikanya (approximately 200 episodes), which is produced by Arindam Sil and has started to air on Star Jalsha. In this series, Anirban has played the role of the male lead "Ankush", who is a fearless and honest forest ranger.

== Web series ==
Anirban worked on the web series Byomkesh, where he portrays the title character, Satyaneshi Byomkesh Bakshi, written by Sharadindu Bandyopadhyay. The web series aired on Hoichoi Originals (a web platform of Shree Venkatesh Films) from 14 October 2017.

| Year | Series/Film | Director | Character | Other Roles | Notes |
|---|---|---|---|---|---|
| 2017–2019 | Byomkesh (Season 1–4) | Sayantan Ghosal, Soumik Chattopadhyay | Byomkesh | | Based on Sharadindu Bandyopadhyay's Byomkesh Bakshi |
| 2018 | Laboratory | Soumik Chattopadhyay | Rebati | | Based on Rabindranath Tagore's Laboratory |
| 2019 | Paanch Phoron | Suman Mukhopadhyay | Indrajeet | | Anthology |
| 2019 | Manbhanjan | Abhijit Chowdhury | Gopinath | | Based on Rabindranath Tagore's Manbhanjan |
| 2020–2021 | Byomkesh (Season 5–7) | Soumik Haldar | Byomkesh | | Based on Sharadindu Bandyopadhyay's Byomkesh Bakshi |
| 2021 | Robindronath Ekhane Kawkhono Khete Asenni | Srijit Mukherji | Atar Ali | | Based on Mohammad Nazim Uddin's Robindronath Ekhane Kawkhono Khete Aashenni |
| 2021 | Mandaar | Anirban Bhattacharya | Muqaddar Mukherjee | Director | Directorial debut, Based on William Shakespeare's Macbeth |
| 2022 | Tiktiki | Dhrubo Banerjee | Milan Basak | | Based on Anthony Shaffer's Sleuth play and Raja Dasgupta's Tiktiki telefilm |
| 2023 | Byomkesh (Season 8) | Sudipto Roy | Byomkesh | Creative director | Based on Sharadindu Bandyopadhyay's Byomkesh Bakshi |
| 2023 | Mohanagar (Season 2) | Ashfaque Nipun | Rojob Ali (cameo appearance) | | Bangladeshi debut |
| 2023 | Durgo Rawhoshyo | Srijit Mukherji | Byomkesh | Singer | Based on Sharadindu Bandyopadhyay's Byomkesh Bakshi |
| 2024 | Talmar Romeo Juliet | Arpan Garai | Mostaq | Creative Director, lyricist and singer | Based on William Shakespeare's Romeo and Juliet |
| 2025 | Bhog | Parambrata Chatterjee | Atin | | Based on Avik Sarkar's short story |
| 2025 | Bhootteriki | Kaushik Hafizee | | Creative Director, lyricist and singer | |
| 2026 | Lalbazaar (Season 2) | Sayantan Ghosal | | | |
| TBA | Mohanagar (Season 3) | Ashfaque Nipun | Rojob Ali | | |

== Discography ==
In 2018, Anirban made his playback-singing debut with the song "Kichchu Chaini Ami" from the film Shahjahan Regency, directed by Srijit Mukherjee. Although not a professional singer, he received positive response for his performance. In 2020 he provided vocals for the song "Priyotoma" from the film "Dracula Sir".

=== Playback ===
| Year | Song | Film/Album | Composer | Lyricist | Other artist(s) | Notes |
|---|---|---|---|---|---|---|
| 2019 | "Kichchu Chaini Ami" | Shahjahan Regency | Prasen | Dipangshu Acharya | | Playback debut |
| 2019 | "Bibaho Obhijaan" | Bibaho Obhijaan | Jeet Ganguli | Srijato | Debraj Bhattacharya | |
| 2019 | "Bakshi Babu" | Byomkesh | Subhadeep Guha | Anirban Bhattacharya | | |
| 2020 | "Priyotama" | Dracula Sir | Durjoy Chowdhury, Amit-Ishan | Ritam Sen | | |
| 2020 | "Michael Vidyasagar Sangbad" | | Anupam Roy | | | |
| 2021 | "Nijer Mawte Nijer Gaan" | | Subhadeep Guha | Anirban Bhattacharya | Arko Mukhaerjee, Subhadeep Guha, Snehadrita Ray, Anupam Roy, Anindya Chattopadhyay, Rupankar Bagchi, Debraj Bhattacharya, Sampa Biswas, Surangana Bandyopadhyay, Ujan Chatterjee, Rwitobroto Mukherjee, Riddhi Sen | |
| 2022 | "Shaajo Shaajao" (Male) | Ballabhpurer Roopkotha | Debraj Bhattacharya | Anirban Bhattacharya | Debraj Bhattacharya | |
| 2022 | "Chaarsho Bochor Periye" | Ballabhpurer Roopkotha | Debraj Bhattacharya | Anirban Bhattacharya | Subhadeep Guha, Debraj Bhattacharya, Jijo | |
| 2022 | "Badal Sircar Er Gaan" | Ballabhpurer Roopkotha | Debraj Bhattacharya | Anirban Bhattacharya | Subhadeep Guha, Debraj Bhattacharya, Jijo | |
| 2023 | "Bibagi Phone" | Dilkhush | Nilayan Chatterjee | | | |
| 2023 | "Dana Kata Pori" | Indubala Bhaater Hotel | Amit Chatterjee | Debaloy Bhattacharya | | |
| 2023 | "Jaaney Hridoy Reprise" | Mitthye Premer Gaan | Ranajoy Bhattacharjee | Kuntal De | | |
| 2023 | "Nirobotay Chilo Reprise" | Mitthye Premer Gaan | Ranajoy Bhattacharjee | Aritra Sengupta, Ranajoy Bhattacharjee | Ranajoy Bhattacharjee | |
| 2023 | "Abar Bibaho Obhijaan" | Abar Bibaho Obhijaan | Jeet Ganguli | Anirban Bhattacharya | Debraj Bhattacharya | |
| 2023 | "Tumi Bawdol Hoye Esho" | Durgo Rawhoshyo | Tamalika Golder | Swadesh Misra, Srijit Mukherji | | |
| 2023 | "Kabul Manush" | Kabuliwala | Indraadip Dasgupta | Anirban Bhattacharya | | |
| 2024 | "Tomar Aamar Golpo" | The Cloud and the Man (Manikbabur Megh) | Subhajit Mukherjee | Abhinandan Banerjee | | |
| 2024 | "Shokhi Bhabona Kahare Bole" | Oti Uttam | Rabindranath Tagore, Prabuddha Banerjee | Rabindranath Tagore | | |
| 2024 | "Mon Jaaney Naa" (Male Version) | Talmar Romeo Juliet | Balaram Kansabanik | Anirban Sengupta | Debraj Bhattacharya | |
| 2025 | "Melar Gaan" | | Anirban Bhattacharya, Subhadeep Guha, Debraj Bhattacharya | Anirban Bhattacharya | Subhadeep Guha, Debraj Bhattacharya | First release of the band "HooliGaanIsm" |
| 2025 | "Pokkhirajer Dim" (Title Track) | Pokkhirajer Dim | Nabarun Bose | Soukarya Ghosal | | |
| 2025 | "Pokkirajer Dim" (Batabyal Version) | Pokkhirajer Dim | Nabarun Bose | Soukarya Ghosal | | |
| 2025 | "Morechhi Ami Goto Shonibare" | Bhootteriki | Ujan Chatterjee, Debraj Bhattacharya | Anirban Bhattacharya | Ujan Chatterjee | |
| 2025 | "Pujar Gaan" | | Anirban Bhattacharya, Debraj Bhattacharya, Subhadeep Guha, Gopinath Murmu | Anirban Bhattacharya, Subhadeep Guha, Gopinath Murmu | Subhadeep Guha, Debraj Bhattacharya | |
| 2026 | "Prithibita Bhalo Lokeder Noy" | | Anirban Bhattacharya, Subhadeep Guha | Anirban Bhattacharya | Debraj Bhattacharya, Subhadeep Guha | |
| 2026 | "Jodi Tor Daak Shune Keu Na Ashe" | Daktar Kaku | Rabindranath Tagore | | Twinkle Ghosh, Anushree Panja, Priyanshu Bauri , Ayush Majumdar | |
| TBA | TBA | "Queen Victoria O Goyenda Kanaichawron" | Srijit Mukherji | | | |

== Voice-over ==
- Karnasubarner Guptodhon
- Dilkhush
- Sadhak Bamakhyapa 2026

== Voice Acting ==
| Year | Audio Drama | Character | Other artist(s) | Based on |
|---|---|---|---|---|
| 2018 | Sati Shobhona | Ramesh Chandra Basu | Mir Afsar Ali, Deep, Ayantika, Sree | Panchkari Dey's "Sati Shobhona" |
| 2018 | Jadu Daktar-er Patient | Jadu Daktar | Mir, Deep, Ayantika, Somak, Agni, Sree | Rajshekhar Basu (Parasuram)'s "Jadu Daktar-er Patient" |
| 2019 | Rani Na Khuni | Kalibabu | Sree, Somak, Agni, Mir, Vipul Nagar | Priyanath Mukhopadhyays "Rani Na Khuni" |
| 2019 | Sweekarokti | Kalibabu | Sudiptaa Chakrabarty, Atri, Ayantika, Mir, Godhuli, Agni | Priyonath Mukhopadhyay's "Sweekarokti" |
| 2020 | Dastar Angti | Jasoda Pal, Nehalchand, Moti Hazra | Mir, Deep, Somak, Agni, Shubhasish Mukhopadhyay | Alok Ghosh's "Dastar Angti" |
| 2021 | Nokol Mukh | Unnamed Man | Sayak Aman, Ranadip, Saayoni | Sayak Aman's "Nokol Mukh", promotional content for Mukhosh |
| 2021 | The Count of Monte Cristo | Fernand Mondego | Gaurav Chakrabarty, Mir, Godhuli Sharma, Debojyoti Ghosh | Alexandre Dumas' "The Count of Monte Cristo" |
| 2024 | Raghu Dakat O Raymollo | Raymollo | Saurav Das, Mir, Ayantika, Sudip Mukherjee | Panchkori Dey's "Raghu Dakat O Raymollo" |
| 2024 | Parineeta | Shekhar | Surangana Bandyopadhyay, Anujoy Chattopadhyay, Mir, Godhuli Sharma | Sarat Chandra Chattopadhyay's "Parineeta" |
| 2025 | Kaalbela | Animesh | Godhuli Sharma, Mir, Anujoy Chattopadhyay, Durbar Sharma | Samaresh Majumder's "Kaalbela" |
| 2025 | Kolkataye Taranath | Taranath Tantrik | | |
| 2026 | The Adventure of The Dancing Men | Sherlock Holmes | | Arthur Conan Doyle's "The Adventure of the Dancing Men" |
| 2026 | The Case of The Illustrious Client | Sherlock Holmes | | Arthur Conan Doyle's "The Case of the Illustrious Client" |

== Awards ==
Theatre

- Nirad Baran Memorial Award
- BIG Bangla Rising Star award from BIG FM for the best theatre actor (Male) for the role of Edmund in the drama Raja Lear by Suman Mukhopadhyay.
- Syamal Sen Smriti Samman by theatre group Swapna Sandhani for his dual role in Devi Sarpamasta.
- Sudrak Samman for Best Actor for Devi Sarpamasta.
- Sundaram Samman
- META Award for Excellence in theatre, Best Actor for playing Amiyo in Awdya Shesh Rajani in 2017
- Zee Bangla Gaurab Award for Best Actor for his dual role in Nagamandala in 2014

Film

- WBFJA Awards for Best Promising Actor of The Year in 2017
- Filmfare Awards East for Best Actor in a Supporting Role for playing Bishan Roy in Eagoler Chokh in 2017
- Ajeyo Samman by Ebela newspaper in 2017
- Best Debutant Actor award at International Bengali Film Award (IBFA).
- Bharat Bangladesh Film Awards-(BBFA) for Best Playback Singer( Male) for the song Kichchu Chaini Ami from the movie Shahjahan Regency in 2019
- Telangana Bengali Film Festival(TBFF Aayna)- Best Actor Award for the movie Ghawre Bairey Aaj in 2019
- WBFJA Awards for Best Playback Singer( Male) for the song Kichchu Chaini Ami from the movie Shahjahan Regency in 2020
- WBFJA Awards for Best Actor in a Comic Role for the movie Bibaho Obhijaan in 2020
- West Bengal Film Journalists' Association Awards for Best Actor (Popular Choice) for Dwitiyo Purush in 2022
- Filmfare Awards Bangla for Best Actor (Critic's Choice) for Dwitiyo Purush in 2022

OTT

- Hoichoi Awards- Most loved Character for the role of Byomkesh Bakshi from Byomkesh web series in 2020
- Anandalok Awards for Best Director of An Web-Series for Mandaar in 2022
- OTTplay Award for Best Dialogue (Series) for Mandaar in 2022

Others

- ABP Ananda Sera Bangali Award: 2022
