= Krishnendu Adhikari =

Indian actor, director and producer (born 1982)

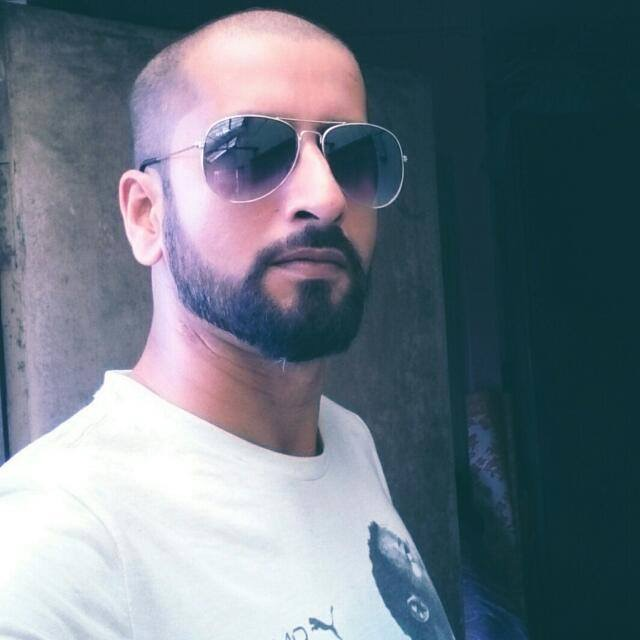
- Born: Krishnendu Adhikari; 2 January 1982 (age 44); Tamluk, West Bengal, India
- Occupations: Actor, Director, Producer in Theatre and Film
- Years active: 2012–present
- Notable work: Ags'uddhi, Code Red, Mrityusangbad, Niruddesh/Adrift, Tope - The Bait, Jara Jege Thake, Indur O Manus, The Senapatis

Krishnendu Adhikari (Bengali: কৃষ্ণেন্দু অধিকারী; born: 2 January 1982) is an Indian actor, director and producer who primarily works in Bengali theatre and the Bengali Film Industry. In 2016, he co-founded the Kolkata-based Behala Project Prometheus.

== Biography ==
Born in Tamluk, West Bengal, Adhikari is the youngest of three siblings. He completed his bachelor's degree in English literature from Midnapore College, West Bengal. In 2012, Adhikari began his career as an actor and photographer with the Rang Roop theatre group in Kolkata, India. Over the next five years, he trained as an actor. Adhikari also learned the Tamil martial art Kalaripayattu under Arka Mukhopadhyay.

In 2016, Adhikari participated in the Bharat Rang Mahotsav theatre festival in Delhi, India, as actor and production manager in Rajar Mrityu (Bengali: রাজার মৃত্যু; directed by Sudipto Chatterjee) and Raajrokto (Bengali: রাজরক্ত, directed by Debasish Dutta). In the same year, Adhikari acted in two Bengali productions: Ags'uddhi (Bengali: আগশুদ্ধি; adapted from the Arthur Miller play The Crucible; directed by Sudipto Chatterjee) and Indur O Manush (Bengali: ইঁদুর ও মানুষ; adapted from the John Steinbeck novel Of Mice and Men; directed by Debasis Biswas). Adhikari's portrayal of Chhotu Mandi (Bengali: ছোটু মান্ডি), the lead character in Ags'uddhi, received critical acclaim. In 2018, Adhikari headlined a theatrical production titled Mrityusangbad (Bengali: মৃত্যুসংবাদ; a play by Mohit Chattopadhyay, directed by Partha Sarathi Raha). Following his participation in the "Stranger", Adhikari and his team travelled to Mysore, India, with Mrityusangbad as part of the 20th Bharat Rang Mahotsav festival in 2019.

In 2016, Adhikari co-founded Behala Project Prometheus with Indudipa Sinha. In 2017, they premiered Code Red - a theatre and dance presentation, adapted from Rabindranath Tagore's poem Sishutirtha (Bengali: শিশুতীর্থ ), directed by Sinha. Adhikari served as ensemble member, production manager, and assistant director to this critically hailed production, which travelled nationally as part of the 8th Theatre Olympics in Bhopal, India (2018) and the fifth C.G.K. Rashtriya Rangothsava in Bengaluru, India (2018).

Adhikari had his directorial debut at the Short and Sweet theatre festival in Kolkata in 2015 with a ten-minute play titled One Two Three.

In 2016, Adhikari acted in the Bengali film Tope - The Bait, directed by Buddhadeb Dasgupta, which travelled to the Toronto International Film Festival, the 60th BFI London Film Festival, and the 21st Busan International Film Festival. In 2017, Adhikari made his debut in the commercial Bengali Film Industry as a supporting character in Birsa Dasgupta's One. Adhikari has also featured in independent Bengali short films, including Niruddesh/Adrift (Bengali: নিরুদ্দেশ; directed by Saptarshi Bhattacharya) and Banshi (Bengali: বাঁশি; directed by Kaushik Sengupta). In 2018, Niruddesh/Adrift, with Adikari in the lead, was selected and screened as part of the Hyderabad Bengali Film Festival in Hyderabad, India, the India Shorts Competition organised by the 9th Jagran Film Festival in Delhi, India, and an international screening organised by The Tannenbusch House in Bonn, Germany. In 2019, Niruddesh/Adrift was selected to be screened as part of the Second South Asian Short Film Festival in Kolkata, India.

Adhikari, along with Behala Project Prometheus, premiered a Bengali theatre production in 2018 titled Jara Jege Thake (Bengali: যারা জেগে থাকে), with allegorical references to the present political climate in West Bengal and India.

In 2019, Adhikari starred in the first installment of a Bengali web series titled The Senapatis as sub-inspector G. R. Neogi on the Indian web entertainment platform Addatimes.

== Plays ==
- "... O Onyanya Kuyasha" (Bengali: ... ও অন্যান্য কুয়াশা) [Lead performer], premiered in 2022
- Anandamath (Bengali: আনন্দমঠ) [Lead performer], premiered in 2018
- Jara Jege Thake (Bengali: যারা জেগে থাকে) [Lead performer and producer with Behala Project Prometheus, premiered in 2018
- Mrityusangbad (Bengali: মৃত্যুসংবাদ) [Lead performer], premiered in 2018
- Ekti Shohoj Khuner Golpo (Bengali: একটি সহজ খুনের গল্প) [Lead performer and producer with Behala Project Prometheus, premiered in 2017
- Code Red [Ensemble/lead performer, production manager, and assistant director with Behala Project Prometheus, premiered in 2017
- Indur O Manush (Bengali: ইঁদুর ও মানুষ) [Performer], premiered in 2016
- Ags'uddhi (Bengali: আগশুদ্ধি) [Lead performer], premiered in 2016
- Ordhek Jeebon (Bengali: অর্ধেক জীবন) [Lead performer and producer with Behala Project Prometheus, premiered in 2016
- Page Four/4 [Lead performer], premiered in 2016
- Rajar Mrityu (Bengali: রাজার মৃত্যু) [Performer and production manager], premiered in 2015
- A Good Deed for Mr. Stinky [Lead performer], premiered in 2015
- One Two Three [Director], premiered in 2015
- Raajrokto (Bengali: রাজরক্ত) [Lead performer], premiered in 2014

== Filmography ==
- Mon Matal (Bengali: মন মাতাল; Bangali feature film), [Performer], Expected Release 2023
- Chhipkali (Hindi: Hindi feature film) [Performer], Expected Release 2023
- Goyenda Junior (Bengali: গোয়েন্দা জুনিয়ার; Bengali feature film) [Performer], premiered in 2019
- Banshi (Bengali: বাঁশি; Bengali short film) [Performer], premiered in 2018
- Niruddesh/Adrift (Bengali: নিরুদ্দেশ; Bengali short film) [Lead performer], premiered in 2018
- One (Bengali feature film) [Performer], premiered in 2017
- Tope (film) - The Bait (Bengali feature film) [Performer], premiered in 2016

== TV and Web Series ==
- The Senapatis - Volume 2 (Bengali web series)
- The Senapatis - Volume 1 (Bengali web series) [Performer], premiered in 2019
