= Dhananjoy Chatterjee =

Indian convicted murderer (1965–2004)

- Born: Dhananjoy Chatterjee; 14 August 1965; Kuludihi, West Bengal, India
- Died: 14 August 2004 (aged 39); Alipore Jail, Kolkata, India
- Spouse: Purnima Chatterjee (m. 1989)
- Status: Executed by hanging
- Convictions: Murder; Rape

Details
- Victims: Hetal Parekh (18 yrs)
- Date: March 5, 1990

Dhananjoy Chatterjee (14 August 1965 – 14 August 2004) was an Indian murderer and rapist. He was the first person who was judicially executed in India in the 21st century for rape and murder. The execution by hanging took place in Alipore Jail, Kolkata, on 14 August 2004. He was charged in 1990 for the crimes of rape and murder of Hetal Parekh, an 18-year-old school-girl.

This was the first hanging in West Bengal since 21 August 1991 at Alipore Jail.

== Personal life ==
Dhananjoy was born in Kuludihi, West Bengal, India, and worked as a security guard in Kolkata. He had married Purnima just eight months before he was arrested in the Hetal Parekh case by falsely claiming he was working in the Border Security Force when he was only a security guard. Purnima worked as an Anganwadi worker with a salary of Rs 1,200 per month and after his execution lived with her parents. After becoming a widow, she has chosen not to remarry.

== Case details ==
Hetal Parekh was a student of Welland Gouldsmith School at Bowbazar, Kolkata. She used to live with her parents and elder brother in a third floor flat of Anand Apartments in Bhawanipore. The Parekhs moved into this flat in 1987. Dhananjoy was a security guard of this agency. He had worked in that building for about three years.

On 5 March 1990, Dhananjoy was on duty during the morning shift (6 am to 2 pm). Hetal left for her ICSE examination at about 7:30 am. After the examination, she returned home. In the afternoon, only Hetal and her mother were in the flat.

Hetal's mother went to a temple in the vicinity in the afternoon. After returning home, she - being unable to enter her home despite repeated knocking - asked some servants of other flats to break the door open. Hetal was found lying dead near the door connecting the living room with the Parekh couple's bedroom with blood stains on her face and on the floor. Two local doctors examined Hetal and declared her dead.

Dhananjoy was not seen in the area after the murder had been discovered. He became the focal point of police investigations. He was eventually arrested by the police from his Village in Kuludihi near Chhatna, Bankura, in the early hours of 12 May 1990.

The case was investigated by the Detective Department of Kolkata Police. The chargesheet prepared by the police included the charges of rape, murder and the theft of a wrist watch. The trial took place in the second court of the Additional Sessions Judge at Alipore. Since there was no direct witness to the murder, the case hinged on circumstantial evidence only. After the sessions court convicted Dhananjoy of all the offenses and sentenced him to death, the High Court at Calcutta and the Supreme Court of India upheld the conviction and the death sentence. The Supreme Court convicted Dhananjoy and regarded the crime as a heinous combination of offenses, aggravated by the fact that as a security guard Dhananjoy had been in charge of the victim's safety—enough to make it belong to the rarest of rare category of crimes - warranting a death sentence.

=== Claims of innocence ===
Dhananjoy had claimed repeatedly during his trial that he was completely innocent and that he had nothing to do with the murder, rape or theft. He maintained his stance till the day of his execution.

== Controversies ==
Some academics and lawyers have questioned the validity of the death sentence and the proceedings of the trial. Professors from ISI Kolkata — Debasish Sengupta, Probal Chaudhuri and Paramesh Goswami - have conducted investigative journalism on the issue; publishing the findings in a book titled Adalat-Media-Samaj Ebaṃ Dhananjayer Fansi (Court-Media-Society and The Hanging of Dhananjoy). It criticized the handling of the case, the media-trial and the faulty judgement delivered.

== Execution ==
Dhananjoy's execution was scheduled on 25 June 2004. It was stayed after his family petitioned the Supreme Court of India, and filed a mercy plea with the then President Dr. APJ Abdul Kalam. On 26 June 2004, a campaign to ensure Dhananjoy's hanging was initiated. Meera Bhattacharjee, wife of Buddhadeb Bhattacharjee the then Chief Minister of West Bengal, led the campaign. Several individuals and human rights groups came forward to oppose the execution. The mercy plea was finally rejected by the president on 4 August 2004.

The date of Dhananjoy's execution was fixed at a high-level meeting at the office of Jail Minister Biswanath Chowdhury. He was executed on 14th August 2004, his 39th birthday.

The family refused to claim his body and it was later cremated.

== Media ==
Dhananjay, a film based on the events of the case was released on 11 August 2017 regionally and on Amazon Prime. The film was directed by Arindam Sil, and cast Anirban Bhattacharya and Mimi Chakraborty in the lead roles. The film is based on the book "Adalat-Media-Samaj Ebong Dhananjayer Fashi". The film also received objection from Dhananjay's family after initially agreeing with the development of the project

== See also ==
- Capital punishment in India
- List of exonerated death row inmates
