= Rwitobroto Mukherjee =

Indian Bengali film and theatre actor

Rwitobroto Mukhopadhyay
- Born: Kolkata, India
- Education: National Gems Higher Secondary School; The Future Foundation School
- Alma mater: Jadavpur University
- Occupation: Actor
- Years active: 2012 – present
- Known for: Film, theatre
- Notable work: Kahaani, Open Tee Bioscope, Generation Ami, Boyfriends & Girlfriends

Rwitobroto Mukherjee also known as Rwitobroto Mukhopadhyay, is an Indian Bengali film and theatre actor.

== Early life ==
Rwitobroto Mukherjee was a graduate of Jadavpur University (Department of Comparative Literature) . He studied B.A. Comparative Literature Honours from Jadavpur University (Batch of 2018-2021). Currently, he is pursuing Master of Arts in the same subject at Jadavpur University.

== Career ==
Rwitobroto started his acting career by portraying a short role in Kahaani (2012), directed by Sujoy Ghosh. His next movie was Open Tee Bioscope, directed by Anindya Chatterjee. He played important characters in Durga Sohay and The Waterfall, a short film directed in 2018. After that, he has done a number of works like Generation, Aami, Goyenda Junior, Boyfriends & Girlfriends & many more. He is going to start his part of shoot for another two films, one of them is Neeti Shashtra & the other is on Satyajit Ray's detective 'feluda' series by director Arindam Sil. He will be playing the role of Topse (the assistant of detective Feluda) in that film.

== Filmography ==
Year	Film	Director	Character	Notes
2012	Kahaani	Sujoy Ghosh	Bishnu	Special Appearance
2015	Open Tee Bioscope	Anindya Chatterjee	Kochua	Debut Film
2017	Durga Sohay	Arindam Sil	Bhrigu	
2018	Rongberonger Korhi	Ranjan Ghosh	Joga	
2018	Pornomochi	Kaushik Kar	Anol	
2018	Kishore Kumar Junior	Kaushik Ganguly	Rishi Ghosh	
2018	Generation Ami	Mainak Bhaumik	Apu	
2019	Goyenda Junior	Mainak Bhaumik	Bikram	
2019	Ghawre Bairey Aaj	Aparna Sen	Amulyo Dutta	
2020	Dwitiyo Purush (film)	Srijit Mukherji	Khoka	
2020	Rawkto Rawhoshyo	Soukarya Ghosal	Babai	
2023	Projapoti	Subrata Sen	Sukhen	
2024	Bijoyar Pore	Abhijit SriDas	TBA	
2025	Neeti Shastra	Arunava Khasnabis	TBA	
2025	Rabindra Kabya Rahasya	Sayantan Ghosal	TBA	
Upcoming	Dispersion	Shashwat Mookherjee	Nikhil Sen	

== Short films and web series ==
Year	Title	Director	Platform	Format
2017	Bumper	Rwitobroto Mukherjee		Short Film (as director)
2018	The Waterfall	Lipika Singh Darai		Short Film
2019	Gupi Gayen	Raajdeep Ghosh	Zee Bangla Cinema	Zee Bangla Cinema Originals
2020	Utsaver Pore	Abhinandan Dutta	Addatimes	Web Series
2021	Boyfriends and Girlfriends	Suvankar Paul	Hoichoi	Web Series
2021	A Midnight Tempest	Abanti Chakraborty		Short Film
2021	Bodhon	Sayan Basu Chowdhury	klikk	Short Film
2022	Happy Valentine's Day	Abhinandan Dutta	Platform8	Web Original Film
2023	Shabash Feluda	Arindam Sil	Zee5	Web Series
2024	Dadur Kirti	Rahool Mukherjee	Hoichoi	Web Series
2026	Virginpur	Jeetu	Klikk	Web Series

== Theatre ==
Year	Title	Director
2019	Archimedes Er Mrityu	Chandan Sen
2019	Apabitro	Chandan Sen
2020	Ami o Amra	Shantilal Mukherjee
2020	Juganayak	Chandan Sen
2021	Desher Naame	Rwitobroto Mukherjee
2021	Daroga Holo Manager	Shantilal Mukherjee
2023	Delhi Cholo	Chandan Sen

== Audio drama ==
Year	Title	Platform	Episode(s)	Director	Character	Co-Star	Notes
2020	Sunday Suspense	Mirchi Bangla (98.3 FM)	Shajarur Kanta	Agnijit Sen (Agni)	Kapil	Mir Afsar Ali, Riddhi Sen	Adapted from Sharadindu Bandopadhyay's mystery novel Shajarur Kanta
2022	Sunday Suspense	Mirchi Bangla (98.3 FM)	The Three Musketeers, Part 1 & 2	Deepanjan Ghosh (Deep)	D'Artagnan	Gaurav Chakrabarty	Adapted from Alexandre Dumas's historical adventure novel The Three Musketeers

== Awards and nominations ==
Year	Award	Category	Film	Result
2018	Telangana Bengali Film Festival-AAYNA	Best Supporting Actor(Male)	Rongberonger Korhi	Won
2019	West Bengal Film Journalists' Association Awards	Most Promising Actor	Generation Ami	Won
2019	AAHAN International Short Film Festival	Best Director	Bumper	Won
2022	Filmfare Awards East	Best Actor in a Supporting Role (Male)	Dwitiyo Purush	Nominated
2022	Bengal Honor of Excellence Award	Best Actor	Happy Valentine's Day	Won

== Personal life ==
Mukhopadhyay's father Shantilal Mukherjee is also an actor in the Bengali Film and television industry.
