= Open Tee Bioscope =

2015 Indian Bengali film

- Poster
- Directed by: Anindya Chatterjee
- Written by: Anindya Chatterjee
- Produced by: Shoojit Sircar
- Starring: Riddhi Sen; Rwitobroto Mukherjee; Dhee Majumder; Rajarshi Nag; Jishnu Bandyopadhyay; Surangana Bandopadhyay; Rajatava Dutta; Sudipta Chakraborty; Kaushik Sen; Paran Bandopadhyay
- Edited by: Arghyakamal Mitra
- Music by: Upal Sengupta
- Release date: 15 January 2015
- Running time: 137 minutes
- Country: India
- Language: Bengali

Open Tee Bioscope is a 2015 Bengali language Indian coming-of-age comedy-drama film released on 15 January 2015, directed by director Anindya Chatterjee, who is the well known vocalist of the band Chandrabindu. The film is a coming of age story of an adolescent boy and his friends.

== Plot ==
The film steers through comedy, drama, and emotions of the middle class community of 1990's Kolkata, capturing the essence of North Kolkata and its para football.

== Cast ==
- Riddhi Sen as Fowara
- Rwitobroto Mukherjee as Kochua
- Dhee Majumder as Charan
- Rajarshi Nag as Gopeshwar
- Jishnu Bandyopadhyay as Tukai
- Surangana Bandopadhyay as Titir
- Rajatava Dutta as Gopeshwar
- Sudipta Chakraborty as Fowara's mother, Boishakhi
- Kamalika Banerjee as neighbourhood women
- Kaushik Sen as Mahim Halder
- Paran Bandopadhyay as Noton Da
- Sohini Sarkar as Iraboti
- Ambarish Bhattacharya as Herombo
- Aparajita Auddy as Gopeshwar's wife
- Biswanath Basu as Pulish
- Sudipa Basu as Gopeswar's mother
- Damini Beni Basu
- Oindrila Saha
- Ritwick Chakraborty as grown-up Fowara [Guest Appearance]
- Saptarshi Basu Roy Chowdhury

== Music ==
The soundtrack is composed by Upal Sengupta. The song "Bondhu chol" and the Cycle Theme are composed by guest music director Shantanu Moitra.

Track list
No.	Title	Singer(s)	Length
1.	"Le Le Babu"	Upal Sengupta
2.	"Tor Jonnyo"	Prosen and Mou
3.	"Pagla Khabi Ki"	Prosen
4.	"Hey Shokha"	Surangana
5.	"Maa"	Upal Sengupta
6.	"Bondhu Chol"	Anupam Roy
7.	"Cycle Theme"	Anindya Chatterjee

== See also ==
- Projapoti Biskut
