= Athhoi =

2024 Indian Bengali film

- Theatrical Release Poster
- Directed by: Arna Mukhopadhyay
- Screenplay by: Arna Mukhopadhyay
- Based on: Othello by William Shakespeare
- Starring: Anirban Bhattacharya; Arna Mukhopadhyay; Sohini Sarkar
- Cinematography: Soumik Haldar
- Edited by: Sanglap Bhowmik
- Music by: Amit Chatterjee
- Production companies: SVF; Jio Studios
- Distributed by: SVF
- Release date: 14 June 2024
- Country: India
- Language: Bengali

Athhoi is a 2024 Bengali romantic tragedy thriller film directed by Arna Mukhopadhyay. The film stars Anirban Bhattacharya, Arna Mukhopadhyay and Sohini Sarkar in lead roles. Produced by Jyoti Deshpande, Shrikant Mohta and Mahendra Soni under the banner of SVF and Jio Studios, the film is a contemporary retelling and modern adaptation of the epic Othello by William Shakespeare.

It marked the directorial debut of Arna Mukhopadhay. Anirban Bhattacharya worked as the lyricist and creative director for the film. Amit Chatterjee composed the music while Sanglap Bhowmik was the editor. It released in theatres on 14th June, 2024 and received positive reviews from the audience and mixed reviews from the critics.

== Plot ==
The film is set in a village called Vinsura, an unknown geographical location with a disruptive biodiverse backdrop. Athhoi is a Dalit who comes to Vinsura with his widowed mother. He has faced discrimination for belonging to a minority community and faced the harsh treatment of "upper castes". His grandmother was suspected to be a witch and burnt at the stake. After he lost his mother due to poverty and malnutrition, Gogo's father, who was the local landlord, gave Athhoi shelter in his house. Despite not having any blood relation, he provided him proper education and always taught him to never lose faith in humans. Despite wearing Gogo's discarded clothes, sleeping on the floor, and having leftovers, Athhoi excelled Gogo, his friend, in every field—studies, career, football, and even romance—thus making Gogo envious of his success and fame. They grew up to become doctors with time. While Gogo pursued cancer research in the USA because he lost his mother at a young age to cancer, Athhoi dreamt of building a healthcare center in the village to help the minority. He was determined to become a doctor and provide medication to the people at low cost because he did not want anyone else to die due to poverty, malnutrition, and unavailability of proper treatment and cures like his own mother.

Athhoi grew up, came to Calcutta, and met Diyamona, aka Diya. They fell in love with each other. But Diya's father didn't approve of their relationship because Athhoi was a lowborn. Despite her father's objection, she married Athhoi. Anguished and furious, he cursed Athhoi, saying that if a daughter can betray her own father, then she would betray her partner too.

Gogo, jealous of Athhoi's happiness and popularity, plans to take revenge by taking away everything he holds dear. He is determined to prove Athhoi, who claims to be a moral lord, has an evil side to him that comes out when someone pokes his insecurities buried deep in his psyche. He returns from the US and maliciously ignites jealousy in Athhoi by manipulating him to suspect his wife of infidelity. Under the guise of being a good friend, Gogo conspires to break the happy family of Athhoi by creating situations and planting seeds of doubt in Athhoi's mind so that he turns suspicious of his wife. Gogo's cunning scheme works when Athhoi, driven by his treachery, smothers his wife and then kills himself on learning he has been played all along.

== Cast ==
- Anirban Bhattacharya as Anagra Chatterjee aka Gogo (based on Iago)
- Arna Mukhopadhyay as Athhoi Lodha (based on Othello)
- Sohini Sarkar as Diyamona 'Diya' Mukherjee (based on Desdemona)
- Ditipriya Roy as Pinki (based on Bianca)
- Arpan Ghoshal as Mukul (based on Cassio)
- Kaushik Chakraborty as Diyamona's father (based on Brabantio)
- Kaushik Banerjee as Anagra's father.
- Mimi Dutta as Mili (based on Emilia)
- Sumit Panja as Radu (based on Roderigo)
- Puja Banerjee as special appearance in item song

== Production ==
=== Announcement ===
On 4 December 2023, the film was announced by SVF on their social media handles, along with the name of the lead cast.

=== Development and Filming ===
On 19 April 2024, an announcement video featuring Anirban Bhattacharya, Sohini Sarkar and Arna Mukhopadhyay was dropped on the SVF YouTube channel. Shot on a black and white colour palette, the video also informed the release date of the film - 14 June 2024. The filming was started from 13 December 2023.

=== Marketing ===
The first poster featuring Bhattacharya, Sarkar and Mukhopadhyay was released on 20 April 2024. The teaser of the film was released on 1 May 2024 on the YouTube channels of SVF and Jio Studios.

The trailer was released on 6 June 2024 on the same YouTube channels. The trailer was launched at an event at Kolkata Centre for Creativity, Kolkata. Prosenjit Chatterjee, Rukmini Maitra, Parambrata Chattopadhyay and Anupam Roy were present as special guests at the event.

== Soundtrack ==
Athhoi

Soundtrack album by Amit Chatterjee
- Released: 2024
- Recorded: 2023–24
- Studios: Bread and Jam Studios; Gaan Bajna Audio Garage; RMP Studio; Wednesday Box Studio
- Genre: Film soundtrack
- Length: 21:58
- Language: Bengali
- Label: SVF

Amit Chatterjee did the music of the film while Anirban Bhattacharya penned the lyrics. The first single "Bohu Bohu Din Pore" was released on 24 May 2024. Sung by Durnibar Saha and Ikkshita Mukherjee, it received critical acclaim. The second single "Mondo Hoye Jaa" was released on 22 June 2024.

Track listing
No.	Title	Singer(s)	Length
1.	"Bohu Bohu Din Pore"	Durnibar Saha, Ikkshita Mukherjee	4:31
2.	"Mondo Hoye Jaa"	Madhupourna Ganguly	4:04
3.	"Bohu Bohu Din Pore - Female"	Ikkshita Mukherjee	4:26
4.	"Ekta Bod Hawa"	Titash Bhromor Sen	3:08
5.	"Dorja Bondho"	Pranjal Biswas, Ikkshita Mukherjee, Subhadeep Guha	5:47
Total length:			21:58

== Release ==
The film was released in the theaters on 14 June 2024. SVF and Jio Studios jointly produced the film, while SVF acquired the distribution rights.

== Reception ==
=== Critical reception ===
Poorna Banerjee of Times of India rated the film 3 out of 5 stars. She termed it as "a stoic interpretation of the Shakespearean classic". She criticised the too much screen presence of Anirban Bhattachrya, which takes the attention away from the plot, but praised the strong performance of the cast, the cleverly penned music and the well designed sets. Shantanu Ray Chaudhuri of The Telegraph reviewed the film on a negative note. He termed the excessive presence to be "overbearing is his presence that everything else is put to the shade – including Athhoi". He praised the sets, cinematography and colour scheme but also mentioned that too much of exposition makes the film unnecessarily stretched.

Deborshi Bandyopadhyay of Anandabazar Patrika rated the film 7 out of 10 stars. He praised the seasoned acting of the lead cast, the colour palettes, the screenplay and cinematography but mentioned the film to be less effective as a film adaptation of a Shakespearean play. Sayani Rana of Hindustan Times rated the film 4 out of 5 stars. She praised the direction, cinematography, lighting colour palette and fourth wall breaking by Anirban. But she mentioned that the length could have bveen curtailed.

Shamayita Chakraborty of OTTplay rated the film 3 out of 5 stars. She mentioned that too much of Anirban Bhattacharya staggers the magical charm created by Soumik Haldar's cinematography. She praised their acting, music, BGM but criticised the lack of empathy, poor writing and execution. Souvik Saha of Cine Kolkata rated the film 2.5 out of 5 stars. He termed it as "a bold experiment in the Bengali film industry". Besides praising the music and cinematography, he criticised the over emphasis on the character of Gogo, portrayal of women, depthless character development and forced social commentary. Akash Misra of Sangbad Pratidin reviewed the film on a positive note. He praised the intricate acting of Anirban Bhattacharya and all the other cast and visually appealing cinematography.
