= Karma Korma =

2025 Indian Bengali web series

- Release poster
- Genre: Psychological Thriller; Dark Comedy; Drama
- Created by: Pratim D. Gupta
- Written by: Pratim D. Gupta
- Screenplay by: Pratim D. Gupta
- Directed by: Pratim D. Gupta
- Starring: Sohini Sarkar; Ritabhari Chakraborty; Ritwick Chakraborty
- Theme music composer: 22 Pally
- Composer: 22 Pally
- Country of origin: India
- Original language: Bengali
- No. of seasons: 1
- No. of episodes: 7

Production
- Producer: Mahendra Soni
- Production location: Kolkata
- Cinematography: Prosenjit Chowdhury
- Editor: Sanglap Bhowmik
- Camera setup: Single-camera
- Running time: 22-26 minutes
- Production company: Fish Curry Movies

Original release
- Release: 12 December 2025

Karma Korma (transl. Karma Korma) is a 2025 Indian Bengali psychological culinary thriller web series directed by Pratim D. Gupta, in his directorial debut for a Bengali web series. Produced by Mahnedra Soni under the banner of Shree Venkatesh Films and Fish Curry Movies, the series stars Sohini Sarkar, Ritabhari Chakraborty and Ritwick Chakraborty in the lead roles.

The series revolves around a chef whose culinary expertise becomes a tool for delivering metaphorical justice and Karma to his guests. 22 Pally had composed the music and background score for the series. The cinematography was done by Prosenjit Chowdhury while Sanglap Bhowmik handled the editing. The series was released on 12 December 2025, on the Bengali OTT platform Hoichoi.

== Overview ==
Jhinuk is a dubbing artist. She belongs from a middle-class background and struggles with her alcoholic husband, Gopal. On the other hand, Shahana belongs from an affluent family but suffers from loneliness in her marriage. Jhinuk and Shahana met at a cooking workshop in Kolkata and slowly develop a close bond over shared recipes and domestic grievances. One day, in a moment of mutual frustration, they jokingly struck a deal to murder each other's husbands. This dark fantasy turned into a nightmare when Gopal was found dead on the street. Shahana claimed credit for the murder and demanded Jhinuk to honour their agreement by killing her husband, Arjun. As Jhinuk gets pushed to her limits, Inspector Bhupen Bhaduri begins investigation regarding the suspicious death. The series uses culinary metaphors that represent emotional manipulation and the inescapable cycle of karma.

== Cast ==
- Sohini Sarkar as Jhinuk
- Ritabhari Chakraborty as Shahana
- Ritwick Chakraborty as Inspector Bhupen Bhaduri
- Pratik Dutta as Gopal, Jhinuk's husband
- Shataf Figar as Arjun, Shahana's husband
- Durbar Sharma as Kanai, Bhupen's associate
- Kalpan Mitra as Anupam
- Avijit Dutt as the Chef

== Episodes ==
No.	Title	Directed by	Written by	Original release date
1	"Biryani"	Pratim D. Gupta	Pratim D. Gupta	December 12, 2025
2	"Chaap"	Pratim D. Gupta	Pratim D. Gupta	December 12, 2025
3	"Kofta"	Pratim D. Gupta	Pratim D. Gupta	December 12, 2025
4	"Kaliya"	Pratim D. Gupta	Pratim D. Gupta	December 12, 2025
5	"Rezala"	Pratim D. Gupta	Pratim D. Gupta	December 12, 2025
6	"Nihari"	Pratim D. Gupta	Pratim D. Gupta	December 12, 2025
7	"Korma"	Pratim D. Gupta	Pratim D. Gupta	December 12, 2025

== Production ==
=== Announcement and development ===
Karma Korma was announced by Hoichoi as a part of its 2025 festive season releases, titled as "#UtshoberNotunGolpo", on 12 September 2025. Sohini Sarkar and Ritabhari Chakraborty were cast in the lead roles. The first look poster for the series was released on 14 November 2025. It revealed the characters played by Sarkar and Chakraborty. The second poster released from the series on 14 September 2025, revealed Ritwick Chakraborty in the role of a police inspector.

Ritabhari Chakraborty shared in an interview the brief that she got from the director — "Imagine Gayatri Devi’s grace paired with the psyche of a psychopath." She said that it was enough to make her agree to do the series. This marked Ritabhari's collaboration with Sohini, 15 years after the television soap opera Ogo Bodhu Shundori (2010).

=== Filming ===
"Pratimda and I are working for the second consecutive project - we also did Rannabati. I have always admired his work. And I often work with Hoichoi because I really value the critical acclaim their projects receive. So I try to do at least one project with them every year."

— Sohini Sarkar, regarding her experience of working on a Hoichoi project and collaborating with Pratim D. Gupta

The series was shot in the second half of 2025. The major part of the filming was done at Beliaghata in Kolkata. For Ritabhari's costumes, a lot of her personal sarees and jewellery were being used in the film for her role because she had a dressing sense similar to the character played by her in the series.

== Release ==
The teaser of Karma Korma was released on 22 November 2025 and the trailer was dropped on 1 September 2025. It was initially scheduled to be streamed on 5 December 2025. After being postponed for a week, the series was finally streamed on the Bengali OTT platform Hoichoi on 12 December 2025.

== Reception ==
=== Critical reception ===
Agnivo Niyogi of The Telegraph reviewed the series and wrote "Karma Korma does not play by the established rules of the conventional Bengali web thriller. It borrows the ingredients — crime, revenge, broken marriages, and a police investigation — but cooks up a dish that feels fresh." He praised the balance between comedy and seriousness, the commanding performance by Ritabhari and Sohini, Ritwick's "unpredictable" acting, the cinematography, lighting and the curiosity being maintained till the last episode but bemoaned the fantasy sequences and imaginary scenarios.

Atreyee Poddar of Indulge Express reviewed the film and opined "Karma Korma doesn’t look or feel like standard hoichoi content. It’s restrained, uncomfortable, and quietly confident. Not perfect, but undeniably ambitious." She applauded Ritwick's calm intelligence and subtle authoritative presence in his silent moments, Ritabhari's restrained acting, Sohini's performance, the discomfort in the plot, the spaced writing, the end, the music and the purposeful occasionally misleading sound design.

Mimi Chakraborty reviewed the film on behalf of t2Online and noted "Karma Korma is a series that starts off with a gripping dramatic tension and gradually settles into a raw, grounded realism that almost feels too close to life." She praised the metaphorical usage of food as an emotional connector, the interplay between gastronomy and storytelling, Sohini's nuanced performance, Ritabhari's complex screen presence, Ritwick's unpredictability, the cinematography, climax, background score and the colour palette but bemoaned the over-stretched surveillance on Sohini's character during the investigation scenes and slow pace in the initial episodes.

A critic from Digit Binge rated the series 6.8/10 stars and highlighted "With Ritwick Chakraborty adding spice to this dangerous mix, Pratim D. Gupta serves a thriller where trust burns, emotions boil, and karma is cooked to perfection." Taslima Nasrin heavily criticized the series and quoted "Since when have Bengalis been making such low-quality movie series! Director Pratim D Gupta fed us Korma, Biryani, Rezala, Nihari, etc. one by one. I couldn't eat any of it. The spices were not mixed with the oil, the rice was not cooked, the meat was not boiled. Everything was raw. It is not right to start making movies or series with such raw hands. If you want to make Bengali culture delicious, cook it with seasoned hands."
