= Mandaar =

2021 Indian Bengali-language drama streaming television series

- Bengali: মন্দার
- Genre: Crime thriller drama
- Created by: Anirban Bhattacharya & Pratik Dutta
- Inspired by: Macbeth by William Shakespeare
- Screenplay by: Pratik Dutta
- Story by: Anirban Bhattacharya & Pratik Dutta
- Directed by: Anirban Bhattacharya
- Starring: Sohini Sarkar; Debasish Mondal; Debesh Roy Chowdhury; Anirban Bhattacharya
- Composer: Subhadeep Guha
- Country of origin: India
- Original language: Bengali
- No. of seasons: 1
- No. of episodes: 5

Production
- Cinematography: Soumik Haldar
- Editor: Sanglap Bhowmick
- Running time: 39–52 minutes
- Production company: SVF Entertainment

Original release
- Release: 19 November 2021

Mandaar (Bengali: মন্দার) is an Indian Bengali-language crime thriller drama streaming television series created by Anirban Bhattacharya and Pratik Dutta. A loose adaptation of Macbeth by William Shakespeare, Bhattacharya makes his directorial debut on the OTT platform through this series. It stars Sohini Sarkar as Laili (Lady Macbeth), Debasish Mondal as Mandaar (Macbeth), Debesh Roy Chowdhury as Dablu Bhai (King Duncan), and Anirban Bhattacharya as Muqaddar Mukherjee, a corrupt police officer.

Mandaar is the first offering from the library of "hoichoi World Classics", an endeavour in which Hoichoi intends to adapt several global works of literature, to recreate them for the modern Bengali milieu in an OTT format. It has been released on Hoichoi on 19 November 2021. It has received critical acclaim, with praise for its cinematography, performances, makeup, and background score.

== Premise ==
Dablu Bhai is a powerful leader in the coastal fishermen's village of Geilpur. He exploits the fishermen with association from local politician Modon Halder. Mandaar is a henchman for Dablu Bhai. Dablu Bhai sends Mandaar to kill a supervisor. While returning after the murder, an old witch tells Mandaar metaphorically that he will take over the reign of Dablu Bhai.

== Cast ==
- Debasish Mondal as Mandaar (based on Macbeth)
- Sohini Sarkar as Laili (based on Lady Macbeth)
- Debesh Roychowdhury as Dablu Bhai (based on King Duncan)
- Sumana Mukhopadhyay as Dablu Bhai's Wife
- Anirban Bhattacharya as Muqaddar Mukherjee
- Sankar Debnath as Bonka (based on Banquo)
- Loknath Dey as Modon Halder (based on Macduff)
- Diganta Saha as Moncha (based on Malcolm)
- Korak Samanta as Fontus (based on Fleance)
- Doyel Roynandy as Lakumoni
- Sajal Mondal as Mojnu Buri (First Witch)
- Sudeep Dhara as Pedo (Second Witch)
- A black cat as Kala (Third Witch)

== Episodes ==
Series	Episodes	Originally released
1	5	19 November 2021

=== Series 1 (2021) ===
No. overall	Title	Directed by	Written by	Original release date
1	"Hell Is Murky"	Anirban Bhattacharya	Anirban Bhattacharya; Pratik Dutta	19 November 2021
The episode opens with an old witch, named Mojnu Buri, sitting on a boat, while her ward, Pedo, is dancing maniacally. While Mojnu Buri is going on making prophecies to herself, a man on a motorcycle passes them. Pedo looks at the man and utters, "Mandaar". The next scene shows a supervisor named Mokkai rallying all the fishermen against their boss, the powerful leader Dablu Bhai. When Mokkai rejects Dablu Bhai's phone call, the worried Dablu Bhai, along with his partner local politician Modon Halder, call Mandaar, Dablu Bhai's henchman. Picking up his work friend Bonka, Mandaar arrives at Dablu Bhai's residence, where he's ordered to get rid of Mokkai, who happens to be his childhood friend. Although initially hesitant, Mandaar accepts the offer and sets off with Bonka. The duo confront Mokkai, while he's returning home and they coerce him to come with them to drink alcohol. On the other hand, Moncha (Dablu Bhai's son) discovers Lakumoni (Modon's younger sister) getting romantically involved with Fontus (Bonka's son), which angers him. He calls Modon and angrily tells him to control his sister, as she's getting out of hand. While sailing on a boat together, Mokkai gossips with the duo, without knowing their true intentions. Though feeling conflicted, Mandaar brushes off the feeling and strangles Mokkai to death, after which he disposes of his corpse. While returning to Dablu Bhai's home in the evening, the duo stumble upon Mojnu Buri, who says a prophecy: Mandaar will become the King of Geilpur's business, meanwhile Bonka will be "the King's father". After having a small prophecy of Mojnu Buri fulfilled, Mandaar and Bonka start thinking about the remaining prophecy. While Mandaar is having dinner with his feisty wife Laili, the police get to know about Mokkai's sudden disappearance. Newly posted police inspector Muqaddar Mukherjee starts investigating the case.
2	"Blood Will Have Blood"	Anirban Bhattacharya	Anirban Bhattacharya; Pratik Dutta	19 November 2021
The episode opens with inspector Muqaddar overseeing Mokkai's corpse being taken out from the sea. Pedo arrives, dives into the sea, and retrieves Mokkai's bicycle keys from the seawater, which he hands over to Muqaddar. Mandaar and Bonka have gone into hiding, under Dablu Bhai's order. While sleeping in his room, Mandaar has a dream involving Mojnu Buri and a car driving on its own. While roaming around the city, he sees the name of a doctor specializing in sex-related problems and he takes his number. Muqaddar, meanwhile, visits Modon Halder and discusses about Mokkai's murder and the unrest developing among the fishermen. Moncha soon arrives and, after seeing the rebellious fishermen refusing to work, attacks the group and specifically gets into a scuffle with Fontus. Modon quickly intervenes and brings the situation under control. Mandaar, meanwhile, contemplates about visiting the doctor, due to his erectile dysfunction and his failure to satisfy Laili in bed. Moncha visits his father, angrily confronts him about his ability to control the fishermen, and unsuccessfully asks to take over his position, as the head of the fishermen's business. Dablu Bhai visits Modon and Fontus while returning home, and he gives the control of the local fishermen's group to Fontus. Albeit shocked at the big responsibility, Fontus takes up the job. He informs it to his father Bonka, over phone, who in turn, informs it to Mandaar; Mandaar secretly gets angry after hearing this. After returning home and seeing Moncha falling ill, the irritated Dablu Bhai calls someone, who turns out to be Laili; they meet later and have sex, with Laili constantly demanding from Dablu Bhai to father a child, which he ultimately refuses to do. While Mandaar contemplates about visiting the doctor and reminisces about his marriage, Dablu Bhai returns to his home. After receiving an angry call from Laili, who wants Mandaar to father a child, Mandaar finally visits the doctor and gets medication. Dablu Bhai's wife, meanwhile, visits Laili and curses at her for sleeping with Dablu Bhai. While talking over the phone, the enraged Laili asks Mandaar whether he can kill someone if she asks him to do it.
3	"The Way to Dusty Death"	Anirban Bhattacharya	Anirban Bhattacharya; Pratik Dutta	19 November 2021
The episode opens with Pedo running back to their hut and informing Mojnu Buri that Mandaar is returning to Geilpur. Mandaar arrives in Geilpur and returns to his home, coming across Fontus on the way, who is instructing the fishermen with their work. Back in home, Mandaar and Laili get intimate; while making love, Laili orders Mandaar to get rid of Dablu Bhai and, in return, promises to bear him a child; she thus instills the idea of leading Geilpur's fish business in Mandaar's mind. Modon and Dablu Bhai watch a video of Lakumoni and Fontus's romantic union, recorded by Moncha. Modon leaves, after promising to control his sister, and Dablu Bhai and his wife plan to send Moncha away to Sutahati. Mandaar and Bonka are called to Dablu Bhai's house, where they're ordered to take Moncha to Sutahati; Mandaar takes up the work, returns home and informs Laili about it. That evening, Mandaar and Moncha set out for Sutahati on motorcycle; stopping at a roadside eatery, Mandaar comes across Muqaddar and talks with him. Laili dresses up and waits for Dablu Bhai's arrival. Mandaar and Moncha arrive at Sutahati, and they start living in Dablu Bhai's empty spare house there. After having a tearful conversation with his father over the phone, Moncha starts drinking with Mandaar. Moncha soon falls asleep, as Mandaar spiked his drink with sleeping pills. Mandaar hurriedly leaves Sutahati and starts returning to Geilpur; his return to Geilpur is witnessed by Muqaddar. While on his way home, Mandaar stumbles across Mojnu Buri and Pedo, who urge him to return home quickly. Due to his drunkenness, Dablu Bhai falls asleep on Mandaar's bed. Mandaar arrives and kills the sleeping Dablu Bhai with a spear. The worried driver, after discovering Dablu Bhai's corpse, is subdued by Mandaar. The entire scene is interspersed with flashbacks of Mandaar and Laili's marriage, which was attended by Bonka, Mokkai and Dablu Bhai. Dablu Bhai's corpse is discovered on the sea shore, and everyone arrive at the scene. Modon calls and informs Moncha about Dablu Bhai's death, and the sad Moncha is comforted by Mandaar, who returned to Sutahati, after the murder. The episode ends with a scene of cockroaches roaming on a plate of food.
4	"Life's But a Walking Shadow"	Anirban Bhattacharya	Anirban Bhattacharya; Pratik Dutta	19 November 2021
The episode opens with Lakumoni talking with Fontus over the phone while she's bathing. Fearing for his son's safety, Bonka sends Fontus away from Geilpur. Meanwhile, Mandaar asks Moncha to remain in Sutahati after being ordered by Dablu Bhai's wife, claiming that it's unsafe for him to return. Moncha vows revenge on his father's murderer, after which Mandaar returns to Geilpur, at the same time when Fontus is leaving. After giving their condolences to Dablu Bhai, Mandaar becomes the head of Geilpur's fish business, and also takes up the work of the local fishermen's group, after hearing about Fontus's escape. Mandaar suddenly gets invited for a meeting by Muqaddar, where Muqaddar discloses that he knows that Mandaar is Dablu Bhai's murderer. He agrees to stay silent and promises to help him if he's allowed to sleep with Laili. Albeit initially angry at the request, Mandaar ultimately agrees. Back in home, he tells everything to Laili and asks whether she'll do it. Albeit initially repulsive of the offer, Laili is ultimately forced to accept the offer, after being reminded by Mandaar that she has already slept with another man (Dablu Bhai), that she gave the idea of killing Dablu Bhai to Mandaar, for Mandaar to rule Geilpur's business. Muqaddar, meanwhile, gets invited to Modon's house for a small feast, where he promises to Modon that he'll maintain the peace and stability in Geilpur; while staring at the distracted Lakumoni, Muqaddar says, "Beautiful", which somewhat unnerves Modon. Bonka starts fearing for his own life, meanwhile Mandaar gets intimate with Laili. Mandaar proves himself as a much more benevolent boss of the business, while on the other hand, Bonka meets with Modon, informs him about Mojnu Buri and her prophecies, and the duo decide to visit her in the evening. Mandaar arrives near Mojnu Buri's hut in the evening, only to meet Pedo, who tells him that he's fated to have a downfall, after which he'll soon meet his death, after his wife's death, and that Mojnu Buri herself, will kill the cause of Mandaar's downfall; on the other hand, Muqaddar arrives at Mandaar's house and gets intimate with Laili. While returning, Mandaar has a tense confrontation with Modon and Bonka (who were also there to meet with Mojnu Buri) after which, the three of them go their separate ways. After being requested by Lakumoni, Fontus secretly returns to Geilpur; after finding it out, Muqaddar informs Mandaar about it, who sends his trusted henchman to have Fontus killed. Modon and Bonka, meanwhile, decide to secretly bring Moncha back to Geilpur, after which Bonka and Fontus set out for their house. On their way back, the henchman attacks the duo; Bonka gets killed, while Fontus flees. After getting to know about it, Mandaar hallucinates the deceased Bonka sitting in front of him, after which he drifts into sleep. Laili, on the other hand, starts washing her cloth which, instead of becoming clean, produces more blood-stains.
5	"Fair Is Foul, and Foul Is Fair"	Anirban Bhattacharya	Anirban Bhattacharya; Pratik Dutta	19 November 2021
The episode opens with Dablu Bhai's wife, after smashing Dablu Bhai's portrait, enters in his room and takes out his revolver. On the other hand, Mandaar's henchman arrives and awakens him. Enraged at his failure to kill Fontus, Mandaar kills his henchman. Fontus and Modon arrive at Sutahati, where they learn how Mandaar escaped from there on the night, when he slayed Dablu Bhai. Moncha vows revenge on Mandaar, meanwhile Fontus remains silent throughout the time. Mandaar returns home, and has a hallucination of the dead Dablu Bhai. Laili starts getting more and more paranoid. Mojnu Buri scolds Pedo for telling Mandaar the truth. Mandaar and Laili talk about their future plans; their guilt starts to take over them. Modon and the others start making a plan. When Laili goes out to buy mutton for Mandaar, Dablu Bhai's wife visits Mandaar and unsuccessfully attempts to kill him, after which Mandaar forces himself on her; Pedo interrupts him twice and angers him, after which Laili returns home and discovers everything. Muqaddar, meanwhile, gets a phone call from Lakumoni, who is asking him to come to her. After Mandaar has his meal and falls asleep, Laili leaves the house for unknown reasons. Mandaar soon awakens and finds Laili gone. Pedo soon arrives again; irritated by him, Mandaar chases him, all the while, having hallucinations of Dablu Bhai, Bonka and Mokkai (all of whom he killed); he soon stumbles upon Laili, who has hanged herself. Lakumoni seduces Muqaddar when he arrives, and Modon and Fontus confront him and manipulate him to their side. Finally descending into insanity, Mandaar captures Pedo and tortures him in front of Mojnu Buri; despite her pleas, Mandaar kills Pedo by hanging him. After saying Tomorrow and tomorrow and tomorrow and bad-mouthing Mojnu Buri's prophecies, Mandaar tries to leave, only to be cursed by Mojnu Buri. Moncha returns home, and after deducing what has happened to his mother, leaves. Mojnu Buri gets prepared for her revenge. Muqaddar—after being persuaded by the others—lures Mandaar into a trap. Mandaar arrives at the spot, where he meets Lakumoni, whom he hallucinates as Laili sitting with 2 infants. Distracted by the hallucination, Mandaar is attacked by Moncha and Fontus, but he successfully overpowers them. The infuriated Mandaar screams at the top of his voice, only to be impaled through the neck, with a spear, by the vengeful Mojnu Buri. Moncha, Fontus and Lakumoni leave the spot, after being called to a meeting by Modon. Dragging Pedo's corpse, Mojnu Buri glances at Mandaar's corpse for one last time before calling her cat and leaving the place.

== Production ==
The production began in October 2020. The series has been extensively shot at Mandarmani and Tajpur in the Medinipur district of West Bengal.

== Music ==
The background score of Mandaar is composed by Subhadeep Guha. In a promotional interview, Guha said, "The world of Macbeth is a bloody one. There's nothing normal there. So is Mandaar for me. Therefore, I thought of sounds that didn't seem to be normal- dissonant, disordered, non-rhythmical. There's a disharmony in the sound of Mandaar."

The audio jukebox of the original soundtrack album was released by SVF on 28 December 2021.

== Release ==
Mandaar premiered on 19 November 2021, all the episodes has been available immediately.

== Reception ==
Sankhayan Ghosh of Film Companion praised the series, commenting, "Mandaar is dramatically tense, a visceral epic that intrigues and entertains in equal measure". Writing for News Nine, Ishita Sengupta rated the series 3.5/5 and praised the lesser-known cast, production design, and the direction. Shaheen Irani of OTTplay.com gave 3.5/5 and said that Bhattacharya's direction has "focused on details used his surroundings and characters to the fullest".
