= Virginpur =

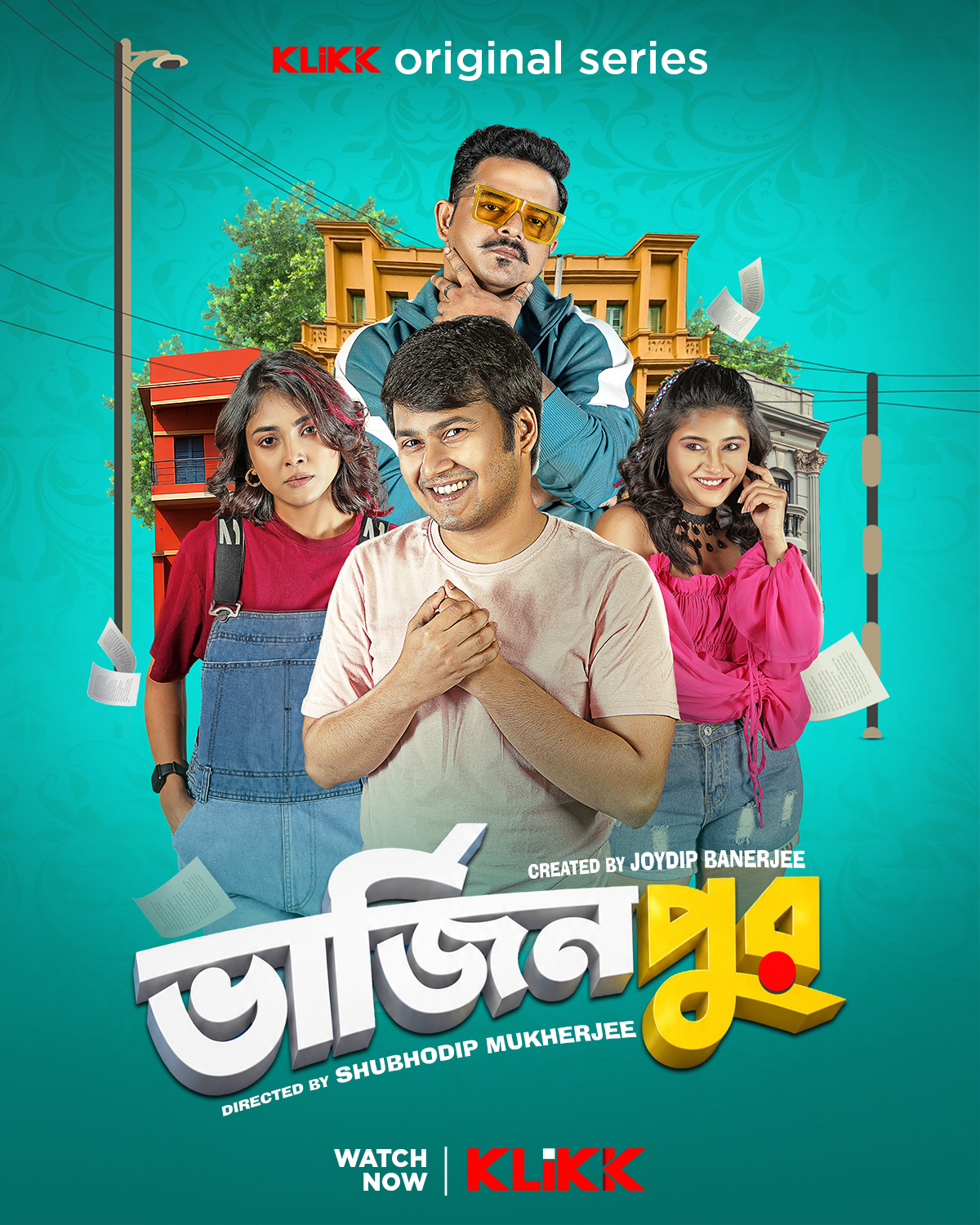
- Genre: Comedy, Pulp fiction
- Created by: Joydip Banerjee
- Written by: Rudradeep Chanda, Soumit Deb
- Directed by: Shubhodip Mukherjee
- Starring: Satyam Bhattacharya, Rwitobroto Mukherjee, Sharly Modak, Nishantika Das, Biswajit Das, Haldar Deboprasad, Suvajit Kar
- Music by: Avijit Kundu
- Country of origin: India
- Original language: Bengali
- No. of seasons: 1
- No. of episodes: 5

Production
- Producer: Santanu Chatterjee
- Cinematography: Anir
- Production companies: Films & Frames

Original release
- Network: Klikk
- Release: 16 July 2026

Virginpur is a 2026 Indian Bengali Romantic comedy and crime web series directed by Shubhodip Mukherjee and created by Joydip Banerjee.

Virginpur series main starring Satyam Bhattacharya, Rwitobroto Mukherjee, Sharly Modak, Nishantika Das, Biswajit Das, Haldar Deboprasad, and Suvajit Kar.

The web series is produced by Santanu Chatterjee under Films and Frames.

== Synopsis ==
The story is surrounded by a kidnapping. A naive village boy's college dream spirals into a hilarious kidnapping conspiracy, where love, revenge, and greed turn Virginpur into a battlefield of chaos.

== Cast ==
- Satyam Bhattacharya as Deba
- Rwitobroto Mukherjee as Jeetu
- Sharly Modak as Rai
- Nishantika Das as Jhinti
- Biswajit Das as Bomb Babu
- Haldar Deboprasad as Gorment Sarkar
- Suvajit Kar as Atom
- Somnath Mondal as Peto
- Sagnik Chatterjee as Milky

== Episodes ==
No.	Title	Directed by	Original release date
1	"Welcome to Virginpur"	Shubhodip Mukherjee	16 July 2026
Jitu, a village boy, arrives in Virginpur and befriends a group of misfits living at a boarding house called Madam Nivas.
2	"Fruit Salad"	Shubhodip Mukherjee	16 July 2026
Jitu gets in a conflict with Bombabu and they plan a revenge prank as retaliation.
3	"Gorment Sarkar"	Shubhodip Mukherjee	16 July 2026
Bombabu calls on the help of his corrupt police henchman Gorment Sarkar as the group executes their masterplan.
4	"Betraybaaj"	Shubhodip Mukherjee	16 July 2026
Bombabu looks for Rai as Jitu and Rai get drawn into a new crisis.
5	"Khela Hobe"	Shubhodip Mukherjee	16 July 2026
All the involved parties reach Hotel Shanti Neer, setting up the climax.
