= Phera (2026 film) =

2026 Indian Bengali film

- Theatrical release poster
- Directed by: Pritha Chakraborty
- Screenplay by: Pritha Chakraborty; Sayantan Sarkar
- Story by: Pritha Chakraborty
- Dialogues by: Pritha Chakraborty
- Produced by: Pradip Kumar Nandy
- Starring: Sanjay Mishra; Ritwick Chakraborty; Sohini Sarkar
- Cinematography: Subhankar Bhar
- Edited by: Subhajit Singha
- Music by: Ranajoy Bhattacharjee; Nilanjan Ghosal
- Production company: Nandy Movies
- Distributed by: PVR Inox Pictures
- Release date: 29 May 2026
- Running time: 139 minutes
- Country: India
- Language: Bengali

Phera (transl. Return) is a 2026 Indian Bengali-language family drama film written and directed by Pritha Chakraborty. Produced by Pradip Kumar Nandy under the banner of Nandy Movies, the film stars Sanjay Mishra and Ritwick Chakraborty in the lead role. This film marked the Bengali film debut of Mishra.

The film is about a distanced father and son as they attempt to rebuild their relationship following an unexpected return. Ranajoy Bhattacharjee and Nilanjan Ghosal have done the music of the film. Subhankar Bhar did the cinematography while Subhajit Singha handled the editing. The film was released in the theatres on 29 May 2026.

== Synopsis ==
Pannalal, an ageing man, has a strained relationship with his son, Palash, who lives and works in Kolkata. After Pannalal is injured in an accident, the two are forced to spend time together. As they reconnect, they confront unresolved issues stemming from their past. During this period, Pannalal develops a friendship with Snigdha, while he and Palash gradually gain a better understanding of each other.

== Cast ==
- Sanjay Mishra as Pannalal Chatterjee
- Ritwick Chakraborty as Palash Chatterjee, Pannalal's son
- Sohini Sarkar as Snigdha, Palash's landlady
- Priyanka Sarkar as Palash's ex-wife
- Pradeep Bhattacharya as Bonku, Pannalal's friend
- Subrat Dutta as Ananda, Palash's colleague

== Production ==
=== Development ===
Director Pritha Chakraborty mentioned in an interview that the screenplay of Phera was inspired by her father's frequent visits to his hometown of Ranaghat, which she interpreted as a return to the memories of his childhood. She stated that Sanjay Mishra wore her father's original fatua and panjabi while portraying Pannalal, and the old brown suitcase used by Pannalal in the film also belonged to her father. Phera marked director Pritha Chakraborty's second film, after Mukherjee Da'r Bou (2019). The first poster of the film was released on 23 April 2026.

=== Casting ===
While working on a film at the Satyajit Ray Film and Television Institute, Subrat Dutta, a junior from the National School of Drama, introduced Sanjay Mishra to producer Pradip Nandy of Nandy Movies, who wanted to cast him in a Bengali film. Mishra later met director Pritha Chakraborty to discuss the project, following which the collaboration was finalised. Phera marked Mishra's Bengali film debut. Ritwick Chakraborty was cast to play the role of Palash, Mishra's son in the film. Sohini Sarkar was cast in the film, in the role of Snigdha, Palash's landlady.

== Themes ==
- Homecoming and self-discovery: The film's title, Phera, reflects the idea of returning to one's roots. The storyline uses Palash's journey back to his village to explore the themes of homecoming and self-discovery. The return to Kalindipur becomes both a physical journey and an opportunity for Palash to confront his past and reassess his sense of self.
- Ambition and attachment: Phera contrasts the bustling city of Kolkata with the quiet village of Kalindipur. The film contrasts Palash's aspirations for professional success and urban life with his father Pannalal's attachment to their ancestral home. It examines the conflict between ambition and familial responsibilities.

== Soundtrack ==
Phera

Soundtrack album by Ranajoy Bhattacharjee and Nilanjan Ghosal
- Released: 2026
- Genre: Film soundtrack
- Length: 8:07
- Language: Bengali
- Label: Nandy Movies

Ranajoy Bhattacharjee and Nilanjan Ghosal have composed the music as well as the background score of the series. The lyrics have also been penned by Bhattacharjee and Ghosal.

The first single "Aro Poth" was released on 8 May 2026. The second single "Bhalobasar Jomi" was released on 24 May 2026.

Track listing
No.	Title	Lyrics	Music	Singer(s)	Length
1.	"Aro Poth"	Ranajoy Bhattacharjee	Ranajoy Bhattacharjee	Ranajoy Bhattacharjee	4:13
2.	"Bhalobasar Jomi"	Nilanjan Ghosal	Nilanjan Ghosal	Debraj Bhattacharya	3:54
Total length:					8:07

== Release ==
The film was released in the theatres on 29 May 2026.

== Marketing ==
The teaser of Phera was dropped on 26 April 2026. The trailer was released on 12 May 2026. The premiere for the film was held at the PVR INOX in South City Mall, Kolkata.

== Reception ==
=== Critical reception ===
Poorna Banerjee of The Times of India rated the film 3.5/5 stars and wrote "Phera ultimately succeeds because of its honesty. Rather than offering grand revelations, it gently reminds us that life is finite, relationships are fragile, and the people we love often matter more than the ambitions that pull us away from them." She appreciated the direction, the attention to emotional details, performances of Mishra and Chakraborty, the chemistry between them, Sohini's supporting performance, the emotional balance in the film, music, background score, cinematography, production design and the colour grading but bemoaned the excessive slow pace of the first half.

Agnivo Niyogi of The Telegraph reviewed the film and opined "Whether it is Pannalal, Palash, Snigdha or even the people they encounter along the way, everyone seems to be searching for connection while trying to make peace with their circumstances." He praised the slow approach of the film, the mundane and quite moments, the writing, the bond between Mishra and Sarkar, performances of Mishra and Chakraborty and the supporting cast.

Souvik Saha of Cine Kolkata rated the film 2.5/5 stars and highlighted "Phera is a sincere and heartfelt Bengali drama that benefits greatly from the performances, realistic storytelling and grounded approach. However, its excessive runtime, inconsistent screenplay, unresolved subplots, and weak climax prevent it from becoming a truly memorable experience." He applauded the performances of Mishra and Chakraborty, the chemistry between them, Sohini and Priyanka's supporting performances, organic writing, simplistic scenes and the cinematography but criticized the unnecessarily long screenplay, excessive subplots and loose editing.

Dharitri Ganguly of The Indulge Express reviewed the film and noted "The film felt real, nostalgic, emotional, and so, so Bengali, and something that people across two to three generations could relate to very easily." She praised the direction, the attention to details, performances of the whole cast, the element of loneliness displayed in the film and the chemistry between Sohini and Mishra. Swati Chatterjee Bhowmik of Sangbad Pratidin reviewed the film and opined Although the subject matter is not very innovative in its diversity, the director has brought this traditional problem to the fore in a different way." She appreciated the performances and Mishra's unspoken expressions but bemoaned the length and Mishra's accent in sone dialogues.
