= Goyenda Junior =

2019 Bengali detective drama film

- Film poster
- Directed by: Mainak Bhaumik
- Written by: Mainak Bhaumik
- Produced by: Srikant Mohta; Mahendra Soni
- Starring: Rwitobroto Mukherjee; Shantilal Mukherjee; Anusha Vishwanathan
- Cinematography: Gairik Sarkar
- Edited by: Amir Mondal
- Music by: Prasen
- Production company: Shree Venkatesh Films
- Release date: 20 September 2019
- Country: India
- Language: Bengali

Goyenda Junior is a 2019 Bengali mystery drama film directed by Mainak Bhaumik, produced by Srikant Mohta and Mahendra Soni. The film was released on 20 September 2019 under the banner Shree Venkatesh Films.

== Plot ==
The parents of Bikram succumb to a road accident, leaving the 16-year old devastated and depressed. A year later, he is living with his uncle and aunt, reading detective stories. His dream is to solve crimes like those he reads about fictional detectives like Sherlock Holmes and Hercule Poirot. His uncle, Barun, works with the police to investigate cases. One day, Bikram goes to his uncle's office and is spotted by Sanjay, the senior police detective, for his keen observation skills. Sanjay's daughter Tuki is the secrete crush of Bikram. Smart Bikram gets drawn into the world of espionage when the murder of a high-profile person comes to light. He begins to assist Sanjay with the investigation that seems to be a 'perfect crime' where the murder seems to appear as a natural death.

== Cast ==
- Rwitobroto Mukherjee as Bikram
- Shantilal Mukherjee as Sanjay
- Krishnendu Adhikari as Barun
- Anusha Vishwanathan as Tuki
- Debmallyo Gupta
- Pushan Dasgupta
- Prantik Banerjee

== Soundtrack ==
Track listing
No.	Title	Singer	Length
1.	"Goyenda Junior (Title Track)"	Sayan Mitra	2:00

== Release ==
The film was released on 20 September 2019 under the banner Shree Venkatesh Films.
