= Sleuth (play) =

1970 play by Anthony Shaffer

- First edition 1970
- Original language: English
- Written by: Anthony Shaffer
- Characters: Milo Tindle; Andrew Wyke; Inspector Doppler; Detective Sergeant Tarrant; Police Constable Higgs
- Genre: Mystery, thriller
- Setting: A manor house in Wiltshire, England, on a summer evening

Premiere
- Date: November 12, 1970
- Place: Music Box Theatre, New York City

Sleuth is a 1970 play written by Anthony Shaffer. The Broadway production received the Tony Award for Best Play, and Anthony Quayle and Keith Baxter received the Drama Desk Award for Outstanding Performance. The play was adapted for feature films in 1972, 2007 and 2014.

== Plot summary ==
The play is set in the Wiltshire manor house of Andrew Wyke, an immensely successful mystery writer. Wyke's home reflects his obsession with the inventions and deceptions of fiction and his fascination with games and game-playing. He lures his wife's lover Milo Tindle to the house and persuades him to stage a robbery of her jewellery. This proposal sets off a chain of events that leaves the audience trying to decipher where Wyke's imagination ends and reality begins.

Shaffer said the play was partially inspired by one of his friends, composer Stephen Sondheim, whose intense interest in game-playing is mirrored by the character of Wyke, and by mystery writer John Dickson Carr, whose stories featured complex plots and seemingly "impossible" crimes.

== Production ==
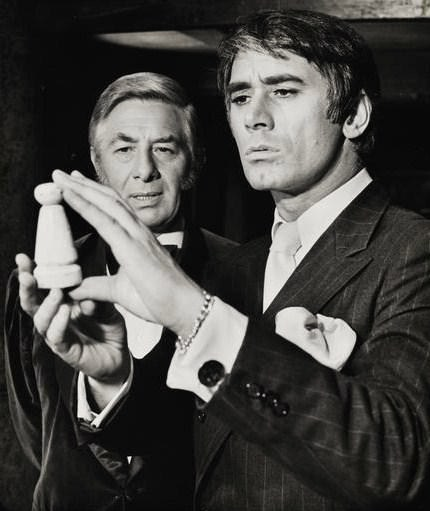
Paul Rogers and Keith Baxter in the Broadway production of Sleuth (1971)

Directed by Clifford Williams, Sleuth opened on 12 January 1970 at the Royal Theatre in Brighton, England then transferred from 12 February 1970 to St Martin's Theatre, London with Anthony Quayle as Andrew Wyke and Keith Baxter as Milo Tindle. It had several changes of cast and venue in its run of 2,359 performances in the West End with Marius Goring as Andrew Wyke and John Fraser then Anthony Valentine as Milo Tindle having the longest run in the play between August 1971 and March 1973. It transferred to the Garrick Theatre in March 1973 for seven months then finished its run at the Fortune Theatre in October 1975.

The play also transferred to the United States and opened on Broadway on November 12, 1970, at the Music Box Theatre, which ran for 1,222 performances. Anthony Quayle and Keith Baxter starred as Andrew Wyke and Milo Tindle, with other parts listed as played by Stanley Wright, Sydney Maycock and Liam McNulty.

When Quayle left the production in 1972, he was succeeded by Paul Rogers, George Rose and Patrick Macnee. Baxter was succeeded by Brian Murray then Donal Donnelly, Jordan Christopher and Curt Dawson.

== Accolades ==
Sleuth received the 1971 Tony Award for Best Play, and received nominations for Best Direction of a Play (Clifford Williams) and Best Lighting Design (William Ritman). Anthony Quayle and Keith Baxter received the Drama Desk Award for Outstanding Performance. Sleuth also received the Mystery Writers of America Edgar Award for Best Play.

== Film adaptations ==
In 1972, Shaffer adapted his play for film, directed by Joseph L. Mankiewicz, starring Laurence Olivier and Michael Caine. Another film adaptation was released in 2007 with a screenplay by Harold Pinter. The 2007 film was directed by Kenneth Branagh, starring Michael Caine and Jude Law as Milo Tindle, originally played by Caine in the 1972 version.

Soviet Television play «Игра» («The Game»), 1978. Cast: Vladimir Etush (Andrew Wyke), Yury Yakovlev (Milo Tindle).

The play inspired Raja Dasgupta's Bengali film Tiktiki, released in 2012. The film starred Soumitra Chattopadhyay and Kaushik Sen.

The play was also the basis for the film Tamanna. While some of the interactions between the two men are similar, the film has roles for not just Wyke's wife, but also his second, younger wife, the Tindle character's object of desire, and the outcome for the characters is darker. The milieu is Pakistan's film industry, Lollywood in its dying days, and is used as an allegory of wider issues. The dialogue, in Urdu, and the scenario are adapted in numerous ways for both Pakistani and Islamic culture.

In 2022, Bengali director Dhrubo Banerjee's first web series, titled Tiktiki, which stars Kaushik Ganguly and Anirban Bhattacharya in the lead roles. Inspired by the play, the series was released on Hoichoi, on 18 March 2022. The series is also announced to be the platform's 100th original series.
