= Colkatay Columbus =

2016 Bengali comedy-drama film

- Film poster
- Directed by: Saurav Palodhi
- Produced by: Joy B Ganguly
- Starring: Mir; Gaurav Chakrabarty; Tanusree Chakraborty; Anirban Bhattacharya; Ritabhari Chakraborty; Suchandra Vaneeya
- Music by: Neel Dutt
- Production companies: Sony Aath; Mojo Productions
- Release date: 11 November 2016
- Running time: 118 minutes
- Country: India
- Language: Bengali

Colkatay Columbus is a 2016 Indian Bengali comedy-drama film directed by Saurav Palodhi and produced by Sony Aath and Joy B Ganguly. The film's music has been composed by Neel Dutt. The film stars Mir, Anirban Bhattacharya, Gaurav Chakrabarty, Ritabhari Chakraborty and Tanushree Chakraborty in the lead roles. The background score is by Dipankar Chaki while the lyrics are penned by Souvik Misra. This is a satirical film set in the present day at Kolkata.

== Plot ==
The story unfolds through an encounter of Columbus and two boys in Kolkata. When Columbus somehow lands in Kolkata in 2016, he is surprised to see that everyone is in search of something. He is in search of roads that would lead him back home while the boys are in search for Columbus to get him to offer tips on attaining success. Columbus starts doling out suggestions to the boys but is also put off by the “competition”.

This film shows how Columbus couldn't bear competition. He was disheartened to see that he was not the only explorer. Every person around him was also an explorer, constantly searching for something.

== Cast ==
- Mir as Kristopher Columbus
- Gaurav Chakrabarty as Balohari Roy aka Roy
- Tanusree Chakraborty as Amropali
- Anirban Bhattacharya as Soumik Gupta aka Sam
- Ritabhari Chakraborty as Shakira
- Suchandra Vaneeya as Sneha
- Arijit Dutt
