= Generation Ami =

2018 Indian Bengali-language film by Mainak Bhaumik

Generation Aami
- Bengali: জেনেরেশন আমি
- Directed by: Mainak Bhaumik
- Screenplay by: Mainak Bhaumik
- Story by: Mainak Bhaumik
- Produced by: Mahendra Soni; Shrikant Mohta
- Starring: Rwitobroto Mukherjee; Sauraseni Maitra; Aparajita Auddy; Shantilal Mukherjee
- Cinematography: Manoj Karmakar
- Edited by: Amir Mondal
- Music by: Arindom Chatterjee
- Production company: Shree Venkatesh Films
- Release date: 23 November 2018
- Country: India
- Language: Bengali

Generation Ami (stylised as: Generation আমি) is a 2018 Bengali drama film written and directed by Mainak Bhaumik, which stars Rwitobroto Mukherjee and Sauraseni Maitra in lead roles. The film was produced under the banner of Shree Venkatesh Films

== Plot ==
This is the story of a teenager Apu, a tenth-grade student who will be appearing for his boards. He writes lyrics for his music at his leisure, and has a burning passion for the guitar. However, he cannot unleash the spark he has got within, for his family would not allow him to. One day, his cousin Durga comes from Delhi for a brief stay with his family in Kolkata, until her checkup with a psychiatrist is done with. She is charming, rebellious, enigmatic and supportive towards Apu and his aspirations. Remember Pather Panchali, how Apu looked up to Durga, the undying faith, the comfort he found in her. Here Durga comes like the 'Sharodatsav' or Durga Puja in Apu's life, never staying long enough- but nevertheless the stay, the aura, and the adoration leaves him scarred. Durga brought with her memories to cherish forever, to look back at, and to reassure himself that he had found that special someone.

Durga is lost in her own personal troubles, sorting her distorted, unrequited love for a much older man, deciphering the worth of her relationships and commitments. Her family foundation is at stake, her parents not having enough time for her ever and on the verge of breaking apart into a divorce. She quits taking her pills for depression, without anyone coming to know about this, until it is but too late. Apu unknowingly falls for her. He tries to get her back on track, ensures her medications and checkups are properly done, try to understand her; but could not see into Durga well enough. Durga confided in herself, a lot more than what Apu could ever come to know. By the time Apu could even realize that Durga had become such an integral part of him, Durga commits suicide.

The movie closes off, with Apu singing- "Kal sara raat bhebe dekhechi/ kal sara raat ami onek ghure bari phirechi" Apu would find Durga in his music, in balloons by the bridge, in every stroke of his guitar; every time he cherishes his freedom, he lives his life as he dreamt of, he would know Durga is there, maybe somewhere far but she would be cheering for him, and a faint whisper in the air, saying- "Haal cherona bondhu".

== Cast ==
- Rwitobroto Mukherjee as Arunava Bose aka Apu, Durga's cousin
- Sauraseni Maitra as Shreyoshi Bose aka Durga, Apu's cousin
- Aparajita Auddy as Khuku, Apu's mother
- Shantilal Mukherjee as Apu's father
- Lily Chakravarty as Apu and Durga's grandmother
- Anusha Vishwanathan as Piya, Apu's friend and love interest
- Abhirup Chakrabarti as Apu's friend
- Pushan Dasgupta as Apu's friend
- Agnibha Mukherjee as Apu's friend
- Nandini Chatterjee as Durga's mother
- Indrajit Deb as Durga's father

== Soundtrack ==
Generation Ami

Soundtrack album by Arindom Chatterjee
- Released: 2018
- Recorded: 2018
- Studio: SVF
- Genre: Feature film soundtrack
- Label: SVF

Arindom Chatterjee chronology
Fidaa (2018)	Generation Ami (2018)	Love Aaj Kal Porshu (2020)

Singles from Generation Ami
- 1. "Tor Sathe" Released: 28 Oct 2018; 2. "Kal Shara Raat" Released: 2 Nov 2018; 3. "Generation Ami Title Track" Released: 17 Nov 2018; 4. "Bhule Jeo" Released: 21 Nov 2018

All lyrics are written by Prasen (Prasenjit Mukherjee); all music is composed by Arindom Chatterjee.

Track listing
No.	Title	Singer	Length
1.	"Tor Sathe "	Sudipto Chowdhury	3:54
2.	"Kal Shara Raat"	Arindom Chatterjee	4:10
3.	"Generation Ami Title Track"	Arindom Chatterjee	3:01
4.	"Bhule Jeo"	Amrita Singh	3:58

== Release ==
The film released on 23 November 2018. It was well received by the audience and critics alike. It performed moderately well at the box office. It remained the top-reigning film in its opening week.
