= The Future Foundation School, Kolkata =

The Future Foundation School

Location
- 3, Regent Park; Kolkata, West Bengal, India; 22.4805098°N 88.353333°E

Information
- Motto: "No words- Acts"
- Established: January 1981; 45 years ago
- Founder: Mr. Pradyot Kumar Bhattacharya
- School board: Council for the Indian School Certificate Examinations
- Oversight: Sri Aurobindo Institute of Art and Culture
- Principal: Suchandra Laha
- Teaching staff: 91 (including primary)
- Language: English
- Athletics: Cricket, football, basketball, volleyball, etc.
- Website: www.sriaurobindoschools.org

The Future Foundation School is a Kolkata-based K-12 school founded in 1981. It follows the syllabus of the Council for the Indian School Certificate Examinations. It is guided by the principles of Sri Aurobindo and Mirra Alfassa.

Commerce, Humanities and Science Streams are offered at the ISC level. The Future Foundation School is an initiative of the Sri Aurobindo Institute of Art and Culture. It is a co-ed school and the medium of instruction is in the English language.

The school is accredited to the National Accreditation Board for Education and Training under the Quality Council of India. It is the first school in India and one of the first few in Asia to receive the LabelFranc Education accreditation. This accredition is awarded to academic institutions which have the goal to promote a system of bilingual teaching to students by the French Ministry of Europe and Foreign Affairs.

The school has been ranked the 24th best co-ed school in India by EducationWorld for the 2019–20 periodand is also the recipient of Leading Schools Corp.

== History ==
TFFS was promoted in 1981 Joya Mitter (1936–1999), a Kolkata-based social activist, with the aid and advice of P. K. Bhattacharya (1905–1984), a trustee of the Sri Aurobindo Ashram, Pondicherry. The duo was introduced to Lakshmi Devi, a disciple of Sri Aurobindo, by The Mother. Lakshmi Devi donated her home in Tollygunge, Kolkata to the ashram, which invited Joya Mitter to establish TFFS on its premises. Joya Mitter served as the founder-principal of the school in its formative years and modelled it on the ancient gurukul system of teaching. After her death in 1999, Ranjan Mitter was appointed as the principal of the school.

== Notable alumni ==
- Rwitobroto Mukherjee

== See also ==
- Education in India
- List of schools in India
- Education in West Bengal
