= Dhananjay (film) =

2017 Bengali drama film by Arindam Sil

- Theatrical release poster
- Directed by: Arindam Sil
- Screenplay by: Padmanabha Dasgupta; Arindam Sil
- Produced by: Shrikant Mohta; Mahendra Soni
- Starring: Anirban Bhattacharya; Mimi Chakraborty; Kaushik Sen
- Cinematography: Soumik Haldar
- Edited by: Sujay Datta Ray
- Music by: Bickram Ghosh
- Production company: SVF Entertainment
- Distributed by: SVF Entertainment
- Release date: 11 August 2017
- Language: Bengali

Dhananjay is a 2017 Indian Bengali language drama film directed by Arindam Sil and produced by Shrikant Mohta and Mahendra Soni under the banner of SVF Entertainment. The film featuring Mimi Chakraborty, Anirban Bhattacharya and Kaushik Sen, is story of Dhananjoy Chatterjee, a security guard hanged for the rape and murder of a student. The film was released on 11 August 2017.

== Plot ==
Dhananjoy's story is based on the conviction of Dhananjoy Chatterjee, accused for the gruesome murder of Hetal Parekh (altered to Hema Parekh), that took place in the year 1990. On the basis of circumstantial evidence and the inconclusive statements of the deceased's mother's and fellow workers, Dhananjoy Chatterjee, a security guard of their apartment, was executed and hanged to death on the early hours of 15 August 2004, after serving imprisonment for 14 long years and after having appealed to all levels of court in the country; and finally, to the President of India.

The film begins with a young advocate Kavya Sinha (Mimi Chakraborty) recounting the controversial case of Dhananjoy Chatterjee to her senior advocate and mentor Shibraj Choudhury (Koushik Sen) whilst stating her urge to reopen the controversial case. Shibraj, impressed by her minutes suggesting a different side of reality, approves her of reopening the case and also decides to assist her in the process.

The second half of the film has Kavya and Shibraj taking up the challenge to establish the idea that Dhananjoy may not have been guilty and Hema could have been a victim of honour killing by her mother Surabhi Parekh (Sudipta Chakraborty).

== Cast ==
- Anirban Bhattacharya as Dhananjoy Chatterjee
- Mimi Chakraborty as Advocate Kavya Sinha
- Kaushik Sen as Sr. Advocate Shibraj Chaudhuri
- Anusha Viswanathan as Hema Parekh
- Sudipta Chakraborty as Surabhi Parekh, Hema's mother
- Dilip Dave as Nishant Parekh, Hema's father
- Paran Bandopadhyay as Shashibhushan Chatterjee, Dhananjoy's father
- Arjaa Bannerjee as Chandra, Dhananjoy's wife
- Debapriyo Mukherjee as Prabhat Chatterjee, Dhananjoy's brother
- Kanchan Mullick as Public Prosecutor in Dhananjoy's case
- Mir Afsar Ali as Dhananjoy's Defense Counsel
- Deepanjan Ghosh as Advocate Kar
