= Sohini Sarkar =

Indian film and television actress

- Born: 1 October 1992 (age 34); Khardaha, West Bengal, India
- Occupation: Actress
- Years active: 2006–present
- Spouse: Shovan Ganguly (m. 2024)

Sohini Sarkar (born 1 October 1992) is an Indian actress who works in Bengali films, television and web series. She began her career on Bengali television before making her film debut with Rupkatha Noy (2013). Since then, she has established herself as a prominent actress in Bengali cinema while also appearing in several acclaimed web series.

Sarkar is known for her performances in films including Phoring, Open Tee Bioscope, Har Har Byomkesh, Cinemawala, Bibaho Obhijaan, Kabuliwala and Athhoi, as well as the web series Mandaar, Sampurna, Srikanto and Karma Korma. She has received the Filmfare Awards East for Best Debut Female for Phoring and the Anandalok Awards for Best Actress for her performance in Mandaar. She is also known for portraying Satyabati in multiple film adaptations of Sharadindu Bandyopadhyay's Byomkesh Bakshi stories.

== Early life and education ==
Sohini Sarkar was born on 1 October 1992 in Khardaha, West Bengal. She received training in Indian classical dance during her childhood.

== Career ==
=== 2006–2014: Television and early career ===
Sarkar began her acting career on Bengali television with Ekdin Pratidin on Zee Bangla. She subsequently appeared in serials including Ogo Bodhu Sundori and Bhoomikanya, becoming a familiar face on Bengali television. Adwitiya marked her first soap opera in the lead role. While continuing to work on television, she made her feature film debut with Rupkatha Noy (2013), followed by Phoring in the same year, marking her transition to Bengali cinema.

=== 2015–2019: Breakthrough in films ===
Sarkar's breakthrough came with Open Tee Bioscope (2015), directed by Anindya Chatterjee, in which she played the female lead. The same year, she portrayed Satyabati in Har Har Byomkesh, beginning a recurring association with the Byomkesh film series that continued in Byomkesh Pawrbo, Biday Byomkesh and Byomkesh Gotro. During this period, she also appeared in films such as Rajkahini, Cinemawala, Durga Sohay, Crisscross, Vinci Da, Bibaho Obhijaan and others.

Her performance in Open Tee Bioscope earned her the West Bengal Film Journalists' Association Award for Most Promising Actress. She subsequently received nominations at the Filmfare Awards Bangla, for her performance in Bibaho Diaries.

=== 2020–present: Streaming projects and continued success ===
From 2020 onwards, Sarkar appeared in several web series released on streaming platforms including Judgement Day, Mandaar, Srikanto, Sampurna, Durgo Rawhoshyo and Karma Korma.

During the same period, Sarkar appeared in films including Kabuliwala (2023), Athhoi (2024) and Raghu Dakat (2025). In 2026, she starred in Phera, directed by Pritha Chakraborty. She is scheduled to play a pivotal role in Bohurupi: The Golden Daku, a spin-off to Bohurupi.

== Filmography ==
Key
†	Denotes films that have not yet been released

Year	Film	Role	Notes	Ref.
2013	Rupkatha Noy	Ahana	Marked her feature film debut	
2013	Phoring	Doyel		
2015	Open Tee Bioscope	Iraboti		
2015	Jhumura	Kusum		
2015	Manihara	Monideepa		
2015	Rajkahini	Duli		
2015	Har Har Byomkesh	Satyabati	First portrayal of the character of Satyabati from Sharadindu Bandyopadhyay's Byomkesh Bakshi novels	
2016	Cinemawala	Moumita		
2016	Byomkesh Pawrbo	Satyabati	Reprised role as Satyabati	
2017	Bibaho Diaries	Royona		
2017	Durga Sohay	Durga / Chayna	Dual role	
2017	Shob Bhooturey	Nandini		
2018	Biday Byomkesh	Satyabati / Avantika (Tunna)	Dual role	
2018	Byomkesh Gotro	Satyabati	Reprised role as Satyabati	
2018	Happy Pill	Indira		
2018	Crisscross	Rupa		
2019	Vinci Da	Jaya		
2019	Bibaho Obhijaan	Maya		
2021	Ei Ami Renu	Renu	Her character is based in the titular character from Samaresh Majumdar's novel Ei Ami Renu	
2022	Ananta (The Eternal)	Mishtu		
2022	Byomkesh Hotyamancha	Satyabati	Reprised role as Satyabati	
2022	Agantuk	Sova Mitra		
2023	Abar Bibaho Obhijaan	Maya		
2023	Kabuliwala	Sneho	Her character is based on the character of Mini's mother from Kabuliwala by Rabindranath Tagore	
2024	Athhoi	Diyamona 'Diya' Mukherjee	Her character is based on the character of Desdemona from William Shakespeare's Othello	
2025	Omorshongi	Joyee		
2025	Raghu Dakat	Gunja		
2025	Ranna Baati	Rita Ray		
2026	Phera	Snigdha		
2026	Abhhiman	Darshana	Special appearance	
2026	Winkle Twinkle	Rajlokkhi	Special appearance	
2026	Bohurupi: The Golden Daku	Reshmi Bandopadhyay		
2026	Begni Ronger Alo †	TBA	Completed	

== Web series ==
Year	Series	Role	Platform	Notes	Ref.
2019	Manbhanjan	Giribala	Hoichoi	Marked her web series debut; her character is based on the character of Giribala from Rabindranath Tagore's short-story Manbhanjan	
2019	Paanch Phoron		Hoichoi		
2019	Judgement Day		Zee5	Released in Hindi, Tamil, Telugu and English, in addition to the original Bengali version	
2020	Pabitra Puppies		Hoichoi		
2020	Break Up Story		Hoichoi		
2021	Mandaar	Laili	Hoichoi	Her character is based on the character of Lady Macbeth from William Shakespeare's Macbeth	
2022	Roktopolash		Hoichoi		
2022	Srikanto	Rajlaxmi / Piyali	Hoichoi	Her character is based on the character of Rajlakshmi from Sarat Chandra Chattopadhyay's novel Srikanta	
2022	Sampurna	Sampurna	Hoichoi		
2023	Homestay Murders		Hoichoi		
2023	Sampurna 2	Sampurna	Hoichoi		
2023	Durgo Rawhoshyo	Satyabati	Hoichoi	Her character is based on the character of Satyabati from Sharadindu Bandyopadhyay's Byomkesh Bakshi novels	
2023	Srikanto 2	Rajlaxmi / Piyali	Hoichoi		
2025	Karma Korma	Jhinuk	Hoichoi		

== Television ==
Year	Soap opera	Network	Role	Note	Ref.
2006–2007	Ekdin Pratidin	Zee Bangla	Koyel	Marked her television debut; joined the cast as a replacement for another actor	
2008	Rajpath	Zee Bangla	—N/a		
2009–2010	Ogo Bodhu Sundori	Star Jalsha	Dolon		
2011–2012	Adwitiya	Star Jalsha	Adwitiya Sen / Mumu	Marked her first television series in a lead role	
2018–2019	Bhoomikanya	Star Jalsha	Tarita		

== Personal life ==
Sohini Sarkar was in a relationship with actor Ranojoy Bishnu for several years before they separated. Since 2023, she has been in a relationship with singer Shovan Ganguly. The couple married in an intimate ceremony in Kolkata on 15 July 2024, attended by family members and close friends.

== Accolades ==
Year	Award	Ceremony	Category	Film/Television series	Result	Ref.
2014	Filmfare Awards East	1st Filmfare Awards East	Best Debut Female	Phoring	Won	
2014	Filmfare Awards East	1st Filmfare Awards East	Best Actress	Phoring	Nominated	
2017	WBFJA Awards	1st WBFJA Award	Most Promising Actress	Open Tee Bioscope	Won	
2017	Star Jalsha Paribar Awards	—N/a	Best Jodi (with Abir Chatterjee)	Byomkesh Pawrbo	Won	
2018	Filmfare Awards East	3rd Filmfare Awards East	Best Actress	Bibaho Diaries	Nominated	
2018	WBFJA Awards	2nd WBFJA Awards	Best Actress	Durga Sohay	Nominated	
2018	Star Jalsha Paribar Awards	—N/a	Best Actress	Durga Sohay	Won	
2021	Filmfare Awards Bangla	4th Filmfare Awards Bangla	Best Actress (Critics)	Vinci Da	Nominated	
2022	Anandalok Awards	Anandalok Puraskar 2022	Best Actress	Mandaar	Won	
2023	WBFJA Awards	6th WBFJA Awards	Best Actress	Ananta (The Eternal)	Nominated	
2026	WBFJA Awards	9th WBFJA Awards	Best Supporting Actress	Raghu Dakat	Nominated	
