= Tiktiki =

Bengali web series

Tiktiki is a Bengali thriller streaming television series directed by Dhrubo Banerjee as his directorial debut in the OTT space. It was released on 18 March 2022 in Hoichoi OTT platform under the banner of SVF Entertainment. It stars Kaushik Ganguly, Anirban Bhattacharya and Anirban Chakraborty in lead roles. It is an adaptation of Sleuth, the drama of Anthony Shaffer.

== Plot ==
Soumendrakrishna lives alone in the gigantic palace. He wants to sit face to face with a young man named Milan Basak and invites him. SoumendraKrishna claims that he is unhappy with his wife Mimi. So if Milan marries Mimi, he has no objection. Instead, he wants to give his wife a 50 lakhs worth necklace as a gift. But Milan has to steal it. It starts a series of mind games which turn into a fatal game of revenge.

== Cast ==
- Kaushik Ganguly as Soumendrakrishna Deb
- Anirban Bhattacharya as Milan Basak
