= Upal Sengupta =

Bengali singer, songwriter, composer and painter

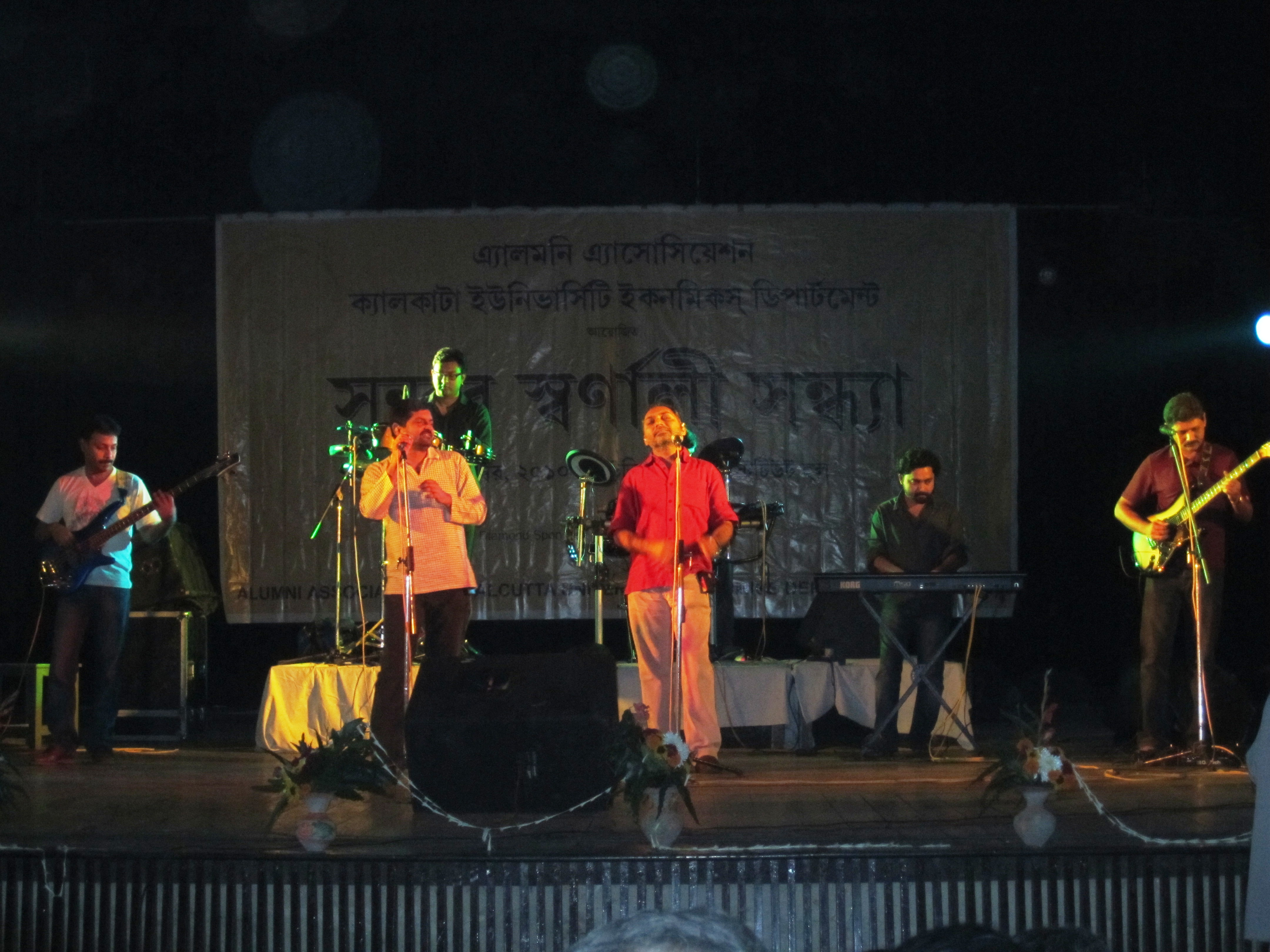
- Upal Sengupta (second from left), performing with Chandrabindoo in 2010
- Born: 23 October 1968 (age 57)
- Citizenship: Indian
- Education: Government College of Art & Craft, Kolkata, India
- Occupations: Singer; songwriter; composer; cartoonist; illustrator
- Years active: 1989–present
- Spouse: Gargi Gangopadhyay

Upal Sengupta (Bengali: উপল সেনগুপ্ত) is an Indian Bengali singer, songwriter, composer, painter and illustrator based in Kolkata, West Bengal. He is the co-founder and lead vocalist of the Bengali band Chandrabindoo.

== Personal life ==
Upal Sengupta was born on October 23, 1968. He did his schooling from Julien Day School, Kolkata, and earned his graduation degree in ceramic arts from the Government College of Art & Craft. He is married to Gargi (née Gangopadhyay); they are childless.

== Career ==
Sengupta formed Chandrabindoo in 1989 with Anindya Chatterjee, Chandril Bhattacharya and others, most of them being college friends. He contributes as the band's frontman, songwriter, composer and music director. As of 2025, the band has released ten albums, the first being Aar Jani Na (1997) and the latest being Talobasha, released in 2024.

Apart from his work with Chandrabindoo, Sengupta has also worked as a solo artist and playback singer for films, having lent his voice to tracks like "O Thakur" (2015), "Hello Hello Hello" (2022) and "Bondhu Bhaabi" (2024). He has also appeared in movies such as Chokher Bali (2003) and Praktan (2016). In 2023, he directed an animated short film, Mirage.

Besides his contributions to cinema and music, Sengupta is active as a painter, cartoonist and illustrator.
