= Priyanath Mukhopadhyay =

Bengali writer & detective

- Born: 4 June 1855; Chuadanga, Bengal Presidency, British India
- Died: 20 June 1947 (aged 92); Calcutta, India
- Citizenship: India
- Occupations: Author police inspector
- Writing career
- Language: Bengali
- Notable work: Darogar Daptar

Priyanath Mukhopadhyay (4 June 1855 – 20 June 1947) was a Bengali writer and police detective in Calcutta during the British era. He is considered a pioneer in the field of mystery and detective fiction in Bengali literature.

== Biography ==
Mukhopadhyay was born in Chuadanga, undivided Nadia in British India. He was an inspector at Lalbazar Police Station in the detective department of the Calcutta Police. He worked in the department for 33 years, from 1878 to 1911. He was a detective of the Calcutta Police. The British Government gave him the title of Roybahadur (রায়বাহাদুর) for his excellent record in solving crimes in the city.

In 1889, he began writing accounts of some of his cases in the journal Anusandhaan, before moving in 1892 to Darogar Daptar (The Inspector's Files) devoted solely to his stories, writing 206 stories over the next 11 years. Some detractors claim that many of his self-proclaimed experiences written in Darogar Daptar were actually stories heavily inspired by foreign authors like Sir Arthur Conan Doyle and others.

He wrote his autobiography in 1911.
