= Sudipto Chatterjee =

Indian actor

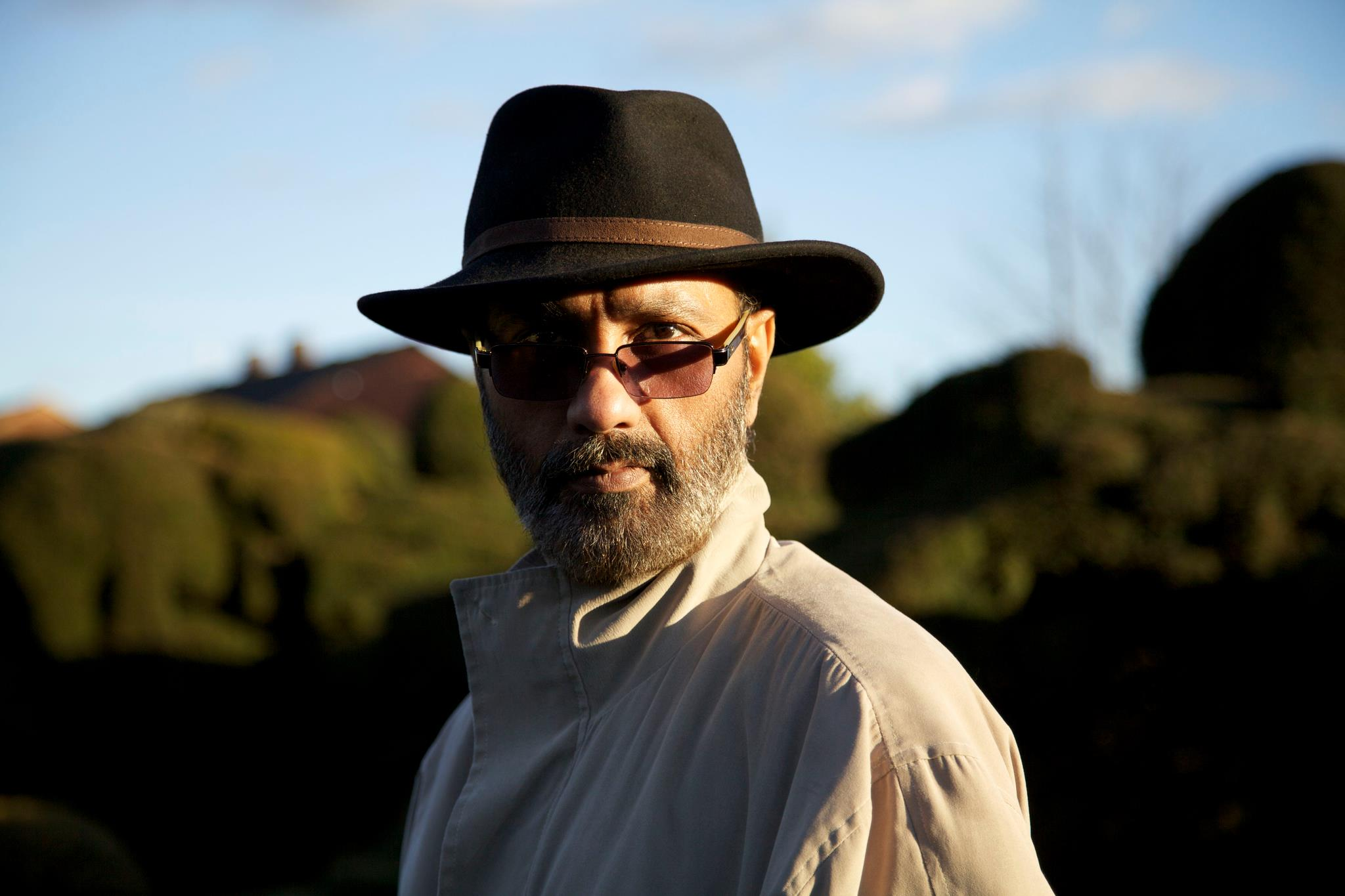
Sudipto Chatterjee

Sudipto Chatterjee (Bengali: সুদীপ্ত চট্টোপাধ্যায়; born: 26 July 1964) is an Indian performance scholar actor, playwright and poet of Bengali descent.

Chatterjee's solo performance Man of the Heart, about Lalon Fakir, has received praise.

== Career ==
Chatterjee has taught at New York University, Tufts University and University of California, Berkeley in the US, along with Loughborough University in the UK, and Jawaharlal Nehru University, Centre for Studies in the Social Sciences (Calcutta), National School of Drama and the Heritage Academy in India.

He is the artistic director of Spectactors, a Kolkata-based Indian theater group.

== Sexual harassment allegations ==
On 14 October 2019, a student who worked under Chatterjee for a theatrical performance alleged that he sexually harassed her. Subsequently, two other women raised similar allegations and FIRs were lodged.

Chaterjee rejected the allegations, deeming them to be misconstruals of a particular form of theatrical training involving sexual overtones. He claimed that he was forced to resign from his teaching position at Heritage Academy. He was arrested shortly thereafter. Many theatre personalities have condemned the incident and rejected Sudipto's defense.

== Books ==
- The Colonial Staged: theatre in colonial Calcutta (Seagull and the University of Chicago Press, 2007)
