= Mir Afsar Ali =

Indian radio & television show host, and actor

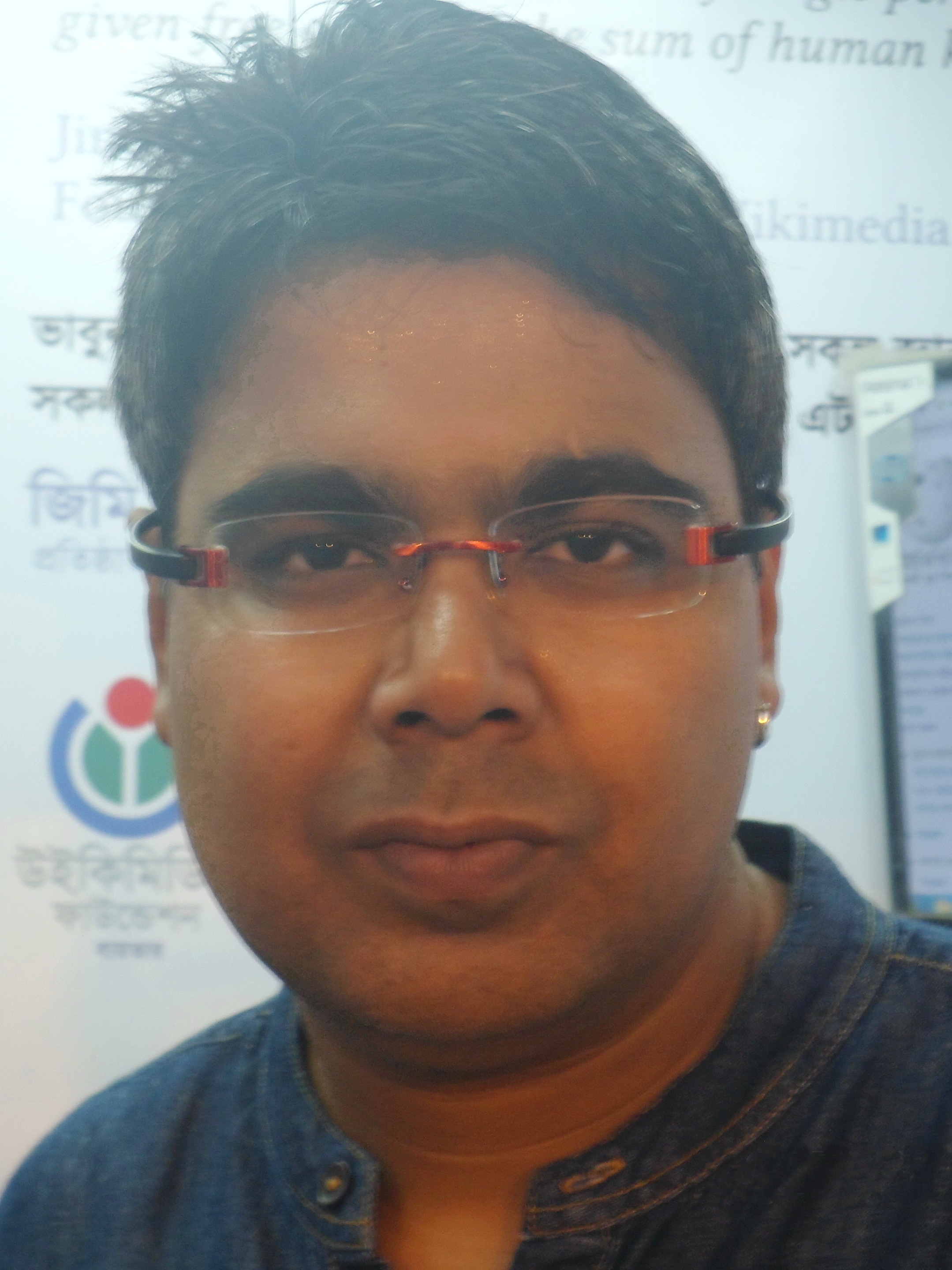
- Mir at the Kolkata Book Fair 2014
- Born: February 13, 1975 (age 51); Azimganj, Murshidabad, West Bengal, India.
- Other name: Mir (মীর)
- Education: Umes Chandra College
- Occupations: Radio jockey, actor, comedian, singer, news anchor, Content Creator
- Known for: Goppo Mir-er Thek, Mirakkel, Sunday Suspense, Hi Kolkata (previously Hello Kolkata)
- Awards: Kalakar Awards

Mir Afsar Ali (born 13 February 1975) is an Indian radio jockey, television anchor, singer, comedian, actor and media personality. He was the host of Mirakkel, a Comedy show on Zee Bangla and Hi Kolkata on Radio Mirchi. He read on the show Sunday Suspense on Radio Mirchi. He is also the producer and presenter of the Bengali food vlogging channel "Foodka" since 2017.

Now he is running "Goppo Mir er Thek", an audio-story show, on his YouTube channel "Mir Afsar Ali". As of February 2026, his channel has more than 1.5M subscribers and over 20 Crore views. His most popular series include the Taranath Tantrik series by Bibhutibhushan Bandyopadhyay and his successors, and the Sherlock Holmes series by Sir Arthur Conan Doyle.

== Early Life ==
Mir was born at February 13, 1975

== Radio Career ==
Mir Afsar Ali began his rHHe studied at Assembly of God Church School, Park Street.He studied at Assembly of God Church School, Park Streete studied at Assembly of God Church School, Park Street adio career in 1994 after responding to an advertisement for radio jockey auditions published in a newspaper. According to Ali, he noticed the advertisement while returning home from college on a rainy day and submitted his application on the final day of the recruitment process. He was subsequently selected to join Times FM in Kolkata, which later became Radio Mirchi. In July 2022 Mir Left Radio Mirchi and Declared that he has left Radio Jockey Career.

== Television ==
- Mirakkel
- Jabab Kinte Chai
- The Kapil Sharma Show appeared for promotion of the film Colkatay Columbus

== Filmography ==
Year	Film/ Web Series	Role	Director	Source
2006	The Bong Connection	Shibaji	Anjan Dutta	
2010	Notobor Notout	Wall Painter	Kamaleshwar Mukherjee	
2011	Chaplin	Zafar	Anindya Bandopadhyay	
2012	Bhooter Bhabishyat	Ganesh Bhutoria	Anik Dutta	
2013	Ashchorjyo Prodeep		Anik Dutta	
2014	Obhishopto Nighty	RSJ	Birsa Dasgupta	
2015	Sesh Anka		Tathagata Banerjee	
2016	Byomkesh Pawrbo	Gambler	Arindam Sil	
2016	Colkatay Columbus	Christopher Columbus	Saurav Palodhi	
2016	Aranyadeb	Dev	Debasish Sen Sharma	
2017	Satyadar Coaching		Dr. Krishnendu Chatterjee	
2017	Dhananjay		Arindam Sil	
2017	Dekh Kemon Lage		Sudeshna Roy & Abhijit Guha	
2018	Ka Kha Ga Gha		Krishnendu Chatterjee	
2018	Michael	Michael	Satrajit Sen	
2018	Aschhe Abar Shabor	Sujit	Arindam Sil	
2018	Happy Pill	Pocha-da	Mainak Bhaumik	
2020	Rawkto Rawhoshyo	Radio Boss	Soukarya Ghosal	
2024	Biljoyar Pore		Abhijit SriDas	
2024	Kaantaye Kaantaye	Inspector Nripen Ghoshal	Joydip Mukherjee	
2025	Binodiini: Ekti Natir Upakhyan		Ram Kamal Mukherjee	

== Dubbed voice ==
Ali gives voices in Bengali, Telugu, Tamil, Kannada, Malayalam languages.

Year	For	Role	Language	Film
2012	Aditya Pancholi	Anjali's Brother	Bengali	Idiot
2013	Tanikella Bharani	Krishna	Bengali	Rangbaaz
2016	Sabyasachi Chakrabarty	Veera Kuttiyum Machineni	Malayalam	James & Alice
2016	Nassar	Hari's father	Bengali	Haripada Bandwala
2017	Eduardo Munniz	Ankoma	Bengali	Amazon Obhijaan
	Pradeep Rawat	Surya	Bengali	Noor Jahaan
2018	Raghu Babu	Surendra	Bengali	Raja Rani Raji
2018	Sayaji Shinde	CM Ranjan	Bengali	Kabir
2018	Murali Sharma	Sanjay Banerjee	Bengali	Haami
2018	Rao Ramesh	Raja	Bengali	Chalbaaz
2018	Rajesh Sharma	Chanchal	Tamil	Vada Chennai
2018	Rajatabha Dutta	RDX	Malayalam	Ranam
2018	Sayaji Shinde	Surya	Bengali	Girlfriend

== Awards ==
- Kalakar Awards
- e4m Golden Mikes Radio and Audio Awards 2025(Best Podcast/Audio Series -Storytelling)
- TV9 Bangla Ghorer Bioscope Awards '24 Best YouTuber.
