= Arghyakamal Mitra =

Bengali actor

Arghyakamal Mitra is an Indian film editor who primarily works in Bengali films. He collaborated with some acclaimed directors like Aparna Sen, Rituparno Ghosh, Aniruddha Roy Chowdhury, Suman Mukhopadhyay, Anjan Dutta, Anik Dutta, Soukarya Ghosal and Bauddhayan Mukherji. He has won the National Film Award for Best Editing for his work in Rituparno Ghosh's film Abohomaan.

== Filmography ==
=== As film editor ===
Denotes films that have not yet been released

Year	Film	Director	Ref
1996	Kahini	Malay Bhattacharya	
1997	Dahan	Rituparno Ghosh	
1998	Bariwali	Rituparno Ghosh	
1999	Asukh	Rituparno Ghosh	
2000	Paromitar Ek Din	Aparna Sen	
2000	Utsab	Rituparno Ghosh	
2002	Shubho Mahurat	Rituparno Ghosh	
2002	Desh	Raja Sen	
2003	Chokher Bali	Rituparno Ghosh	
2003	Ekti Nadir Naam	Anup Singh	
2004	Debipaksha	Raja Sen	
2004	Joyjatra	Tauquir Ahmed	
2004	Bow Barracks Forever	Anjan Dutta	
2005	Antarmahal	Rituparno Ghosh	
2005	Dosar	Rituparno Ghosh	
2005	Herbert	Suman Mukhopadhyay	
2005	Rupkothar Golpo	Tauquir Ahmed	
2007	Krishnakanter Will	Raja Sen	
2007	Aha!	Enamul Karim Nirjhar	
2007	The Last Lear	Rituparno Ghosh	
2008	Via Darjeeling	Arindam Nandy	
2008	Khela	Rituparno Ghosh	
2008	Chaturanga	Suman Mukhopadhyay	
2008	Antaheen	Aniruddha Roy Chowdhury	
2009	Madly Bangalee	Anjan Dutta	
2009	Abohomaan	Rituparno Ghosh	
2009	Shob Charitro Kalponik	Rituparno Ghosh	
2009	Life Goes On	Sangeeta Dutta	
2009	Teen Murti	Raja Sen	
2010	Mahanagar@Kolkata	Suman Mukhopadhyay	
2010	Handa And Bhonda	Subhankar Chattopadhyay	
2010	Ekti Tarar Khonje	Avik Mukhopadhyay	
2010	Antim Swash Sundar	Kris Alin	
2010	Byomkesh Bakshi	Anjan Dutta	
2010	Ami Aadu	Somnath Gupta	
2011	Hatey Roilo Pistol	Anjan Dutta	
2011	Noukadubi	Rituparno Ghosh	
2011	Ranjana Ami Ar Ashbona	Anjan Dutta	
2011	Uro Chithi	Kamaleshwar Mukherjee	
2012	Aparajita Tumi	Aniruddha Roy Chowdhury	
2012	Bhooter Bhabisyat	Anik Dutta	
2012	Abar Byomkesh	Anjan Dutta	
2012	Chitrangada: The Crowning Wish	Rituparno Ghosh	
2012	Dutta Vs Dutta	Anjan Dutta	
2012	Paanch Adhyay	Pratim D. Gupta	
2013	Ganesh Talkies	Anjan Dutta	
2013	Kangal Malsat	Suman Mukhopadhyay	
2013	Satyanweshi	Rituparno Ghosh	
2013	Sunglass	Rituparno Ghosh	
2013	Ascharjo Pradip	Anik Dutta	
2013	Antaraal	Binay Kumar Mitra	
2013	Taan	Mukul Roy Chowdhury	
2013	Kolkata Junction	Anjan Dutta	
2014	Teenkahon	Bauddhayan Mukherji	
2014	Buno Haansh	Aniruddha Roy Chowdhury	
2014	Byomkesh Phire Elo	Anjan Dutta	
2015	Open Tee Bioscope	Anindya Chatterjee	
2015	Shesher Kobita	Suman Mukhopadhyay	
2015	Not A Dirty Film	Ranadeep Sarkar	
2015	Byomkesh Bakshi	Anjan Dutta	
2015	The Violin Player	Bauddhayan Mukherji	
2015	Load Shedding	Soukarya Ghosal	
2016	Hemanta	Anjan Dutta	
2016	Byomkesh O Chiriyakhana	Anjan Dutta	
2017	The Bongs Again	Anjan Dutta	
2017	Meghnad Badh Rahasya	Anik Dutta	
2017	Projapoti Biskut	Anindya Chatterjee	
2017	Byomkesh O Agnibaan	Anjan Dutta	
2018	Ka Kha Ga Gha	Dr. Krishnendu Chatterjee	
2018	Rainbow Jelly	Soukarya Ghosal	
2018	Aami Ashbo Phirey	Anjan Dutta	
2018	Manojder Adbhut Bari	Anindya Chatterjee	
2018	Good Morning, Sunshine	Sanjoy Nag	
2019	Bhobishyoter Bhoot	Anik Dutta	
2019	Finally Bhalobasha	Anjan Dutta	
2019	One Little Finger	Rupam Sarmah	
2019	Andarkahini: Self Exile	Arnab Middya	
2019	Buro Sadhu	VIK	
2020	Borunbabur Bondhu	Anik Dutta	
2020	Rawkto Rawhoshyo	Soukarya Ghosal	
2020	Uraan	Tridib Raman	
2021	Prem Tame	Anindya Chatterjee	
2022	Aparajito	Anik Dutta	
2022	Kura Pokkhir Shunne Ura	Muhammad Quayum	
2023	Revolver Rohosyo	Anjan Dutta	
2023	Ektu Sore Bosun	Kamaleshwar Mukherjee	
2023	Kadak Singh	Aniruddha Roy Chowdhury	
2024	Bhoot Pori	Soukarya Ghosal	
2024	Chalchitra Ekhon	Anjan Dutt	
2024	OCD	Soukarya Ghosal	
2024	Kalantar	Soukarya Ghosal	
2024	Joto Kando Kolkatatei	Anik Dutta	
2024	Pokkhirajer Dim	Soukarya Ghosal	

== Awards ==
- Bangladesh National Film Award for Best Editing - Aha!
- National Film Award for Best Editing - Abohomaan
