= Ashchorjyo Prodeep =

- After theatrical release poster
- Directed by: Anik Dutta
- Screenplay by: Deb Roy, Anik Dutta.
- Story by: Shirshendu Mukhopadhyay
- Starring: Saswata Chatterjee; Sreelekha Mitra; Rajatava Dutta; Mumtaz Sorcar
- Cinematography: Avik Mukhopadhyay
- Edited by: Arghyakamal Mitra
- Music by: Raja Narayan Deb
- Production company: Rose Valley Films Ltd.
- Distributed by: Brand Value Communications
- Release date: 15 November 2013 (Kolkata)
- Running time: 120 minutes
- Country: India
- Language: Bengali
- Box office: ₹20 million (US$210,000) (Note: Figure provided is an estimate of collection in four weeks.)

Aschorjyo Prodeep (transl. Astonishing Lamp) is a 2013 Indian Bengali-language film directed by Anik Dutta. The film is based on a short story by Shirshendu Mukhopadhyay. It is Dutta's second feature film as a director. The film's theatrical trailer was released on YouTube on 26 October 2013 while the film was released on 15 November 2013 in Kolkata. The film deals with the unfulfilled aspirations of an everyday couple whose dreams never become a reality and as they try hard to excel in life. Anilabha discovers a magic lamp from which a genie emerges and is able to take him to unseen heights in life that he never reached before and also life of extreme luxury and fortunes. How they adjust and cope with their new-found lives forms the rest of the story.

== Theme ==
This is a modern-day fantasy tale and deals with contemporary consumerist society and consumerist trends.

== Cast ==
- Saswata Chatterjee as Anilabha Gupto, an everyday salesman who chances upon a magic lamp. Anilabho is referred to by the genie as Anilda which is an Anagram of Aladin. (Note: da here is a suffix used to show respect. Da is the short of Dada (দাদা) meaning elder brother.)
- Sreelekha Mitra as Jhumur Gupto, Anilabho's wife with dual identity who works part-time in a salon and like her husband she too is a victim of consumerism and aspires big while urging her husband to perform better in his work field.
- Rajatava Dutta as Prodeep Dutta alias Deepak Das who is actually the Genie.
- Mumtaz Sorcar as Mala Maal, a Bollywood actress and the sex symbol fantasied by Anilabho.
- Paran Bandopadhyay As Avinash Babu, owner of Mahamaya Studio Supplies and Auction House.
- Kharaj Mukherjee as Haridas Paul, a sculptor at Kumortuli.
- Deb Roy as Progyan Da
- Arindam Sil as Mr. Pakrashi, Anil's superior in work.
- Mir as Balaram Deb aka Bob Deb, an escort agent.
- Ekavali Khanna as Ekabali Khanna
- Dwijen Bandopadhyay as Sanyal Da
- Manoj Mitra
- Sudarshan Chakraborty as KK, Anilabho's image consultant.
- Bobby Chakraborty as waiter at restaurant.
- Rupa Bhattacharya as Miss Pompa
- Biswanath Basu as Bokbokdharmik, an astrologer.
- Anindyo Chattopadhyay
- Sanjoy Biswas
- Sumit Samaddar
- Anjan Mahato

== Development ==
In an interview with "Ebela" Anik Dutta revealed that he wrote the script of Ashchorjyo Prodeep a long time back, during his days as an advertisement director even before he wrote that of Bhooter Bhabishyat.

== Filming ==
In The Times of India of 4 December 2012, Anik Dutta revealed his plans of starting shooting by 11 December 2012 and completing it within January 2013. When asked about shooting in tailor made seasons like that of Durga Puja or Poila Boishakh, which are preferred by most directors, he stated that these issues were to be decided by the producers and not by him. Shooting started as expected in Shree Narayan Studio of Joka, Kolkata. Actor Rajatava Dutta got his head shaved for the first time for a film.

== Soundtrack ==
Ashchorjyo Prodeep

Soundtrack album by Raja Narayan Deb
- Released: 1 November 2013
- Recorded: 2013, Sonic Solutions, Kolkata
- Genres: Film soundtrack; Dubstep; Electronica; Rock; Club; Funk; Breakbeat; House
- Length: 29:57
- Label: Dhoom Music
- Producers: Raja Narayan Deb; Brand Value Communications

Raja Narayan Deb chronology
| Bangla Naache Bhangra (2013) | Ashchorjyo Prodeep (2013) |

The soundtrack of the film has been composed by Raja Narayan Deb who had also collaborated with the Anik Dutta, the director on his first and previous directorial venture, Bhooter Bhabishyat. The film being based upon a middle-class man's overnight meteoric rise catapulted by his finding of a magic lamp, the soundtrack and the songs are also composed and written keeping in mind this aspect of the theme. The music changes after Anilabho (Saswata Chatterjee) discovers the lamp. It is subtle with the use of flute, clarinet, and oboe initially but after finding the magic lamp it grows more flashier and urban complete with bling using electronic sounds as well as heavy use of drums and guitars . The title song is replete with Arabic flavour and is sung by Timir and Rishi Chanda. It is a mish-mash of Arabic percussion that gradually paves the way for rock-infused track. The film consists of an item song Gimme More, sung by Tanya Sen, a member of Indie Band titled "Zoo" and has western and classical touch with the video version featuring Mumtaz Sorcar. The third song of the film titled Makeover song captures Chatterjee's drastic change from a common man to an uptown high society person. Another song called Office Office inspired by Hollywood musicals such as Fiddler On The Roof, Sound of Music and My Fair Lady among others is sung by the lead actors Chatterjee and Rajatava Dutta and Deb Roy ( Co-writer & Associate Director of the Film); the reason for doing so is the ability of the actors to personify the song as they portray the characters on-screen. Raja Narayan Deb also collaborates with Amit Kumar, son of legendary singer, Kishore Kumar for the song Charidik bodle gechhe a rendition of Prithibi bodle gechhe, sung by Kumar; Kumar also raps in the song. Though the melody and arrangements are still the same, the lyrics have been re-written by the director himself incorporating Dubstep, breakbeat and House elements into the song. Thus the entire soundtrack consists of these five tracks. The video for the item song Gimme More inspired by Mozart's 40th Symphony was released on YouTube on 1 November 2013. The video for the second songm called "Makeover Song", was released on YouTube on 4 November 2013 sung by Dibyendu Mukherjee, written by Anik Dutta and choreographed by Sudarshan Chakraborty featuring Rajatava Dutta and Saswata Chatterjee among others.

All lyrics are written by Anik Dutta

Track listing
| No. | Title | Music | Singer(s) | Length |
|---|---|---|---|---|
| 1. | "Ashchorjyo Prodeep - The Title Song" | Raja Narayan Deb | Timir, Rishi Chanda, Sukanya Ghosh | 2:30 |
| 2. | "Beshi Beshi - Gimme More" | Raja Narayan Deb | Tanya Sen | 3:25 |
| 3. | "Ei Pellai Office - The Office Song/The Dialogue Song" | Raja Narayan Deb | Saswata Chatterjee, Rajatava Dutta and Deb Roy. | 1:59 |
| 4. | "Case Jabe Bodle - The Makeover Song" | Raja Narayan Deb | Dibyendu Mukherjee | 2:59 |
| 5. | "Hai Re - The Funny Sad Song" | Raja Narayan Deb | Raghav Chatterjee | 1:43 |
| 6. | "Ashchorjyo Prodeep Theme" | Raja Narayan Deb | Instrumental | 3:13 |
| 7. | "Beshi Beshi – Gimme More (Remix)" | Raja Narayan Deb | Tanya Sen | 5:13 |
| 8. | "Ashchorjyo Prodeep - The Title Song (Karaoke Track)" | Raja Narayan Deb | Karaoke Track | 2:31 |
| 9. | "Beshi Beshi – Gimme More (Karaoke Track)" | Raja Narayan Deb | Karaoke Track | 3:27 |
| 10. | "Case Jabe Bodle – The Makeover Song (Karaoke Track)" | Raja Narayan Deb | Karaoke Track | 2:57 |
| Total length: | | | | 29:57 |

Bonus Track

Bonus Track
| No. | Title | Music | Singer(s) | Length |
|---|---|---|---|---|
| 11. | "Charidik Bodle Gechhe The Car Song" | Raja Narayan Deb | Amit Kumar; Original Singer: Kishore Kumar | 3:46 |
| Total length: | | | | 33:43 |

== Release and reception ==
The film released on 15 November 2013. A digital poster was released on YouTube on 26 October 2013 featuring Rajatava Dutta, Saswata Chatterjee, Sreelekha Mitra and Mumtaz Sorcar. Saswata and Sreelekha Mitra's work received praise.

== Box office ==
According to a report by Bengali tabloid Ebela the film had an opening week occupancy of 90% collecting an amount of ₹3.5 million (US$36,000) and ₹10 million (US$100,000) in its first and second week respectively, taking its two-week total to ₹13.5 million (US$140,000). It collected a further ₹7.5 million (US$78,000) to take its four-week collection to ₹20 million (US$210,000).

== See also ==
- Chayamoy
- Gosainbaganer Bhoot
- Goynar Baksho
