= Avik Mukhopadhyay =

Indian cinematographer

- Born: Kalimpong, West Bengal, India
- Occupation: Cinematographer
- Spouse: Madhuja Mukherjee

Avik Mukhopadhyay (Bengali: অভীক মুখোপাধ্যায়) is an Indian cinematographer who works in Bengali and Hindi films. He collaborated with multiple directors like Mrinal Sen, Aparna Sen, Rituparno Ghosh, Srijit Mukherji, Kamaleshwar Mukherjee, Anik Dutta, Aniruddha Roy Chowdhury, Shoojit Sircar and Sujoy Ghosh. Some of his works include Chokher Bali, Patalghar, Bhalo Theko, Raincoat, Dosar, The Last Lear, Antaheen, Chitrangada: The Crowning Wish, October and Sardar Udham.

He is the recipient of the National Film Award for Best Cinematography four times and the Filmfare Award for Best Cinematographer twice. He studied the cinematography at the Film and television Institute of India.

== Filmography ==
Denotes films that have not yet been released

Year	Film	Director	Language	Ref
1999	Asukh	Rituparno Ghosh	Bengali	
2000	Paromitar Ek Din	Aparna Sen	Bengali	
2000	Utsab	Rituparno Ghosh	Bengali	
2002	Titli	Rituparno Ghosh	Bengali	
2002	Aamar Bhuvan	Mrinal Sen	Bengali	
2003	Shubho Mahurat	Rituparno Ghosh	Bengali	
2003	Chokher Bali	Rituparno Ghosh	Bengali	
2003	Patalghar	Abhijit Chowdhury	Bengali	
2003	Bhalo Theko	Gautam Haldar	Bengali	
2004	Raincoat	Rituparno Ghosh	Hindi	
2005	Bunty Aur Babli	Shaad Ali	Hindi	
2006	Chukkallo Chandrudu	Sivakumar	Telugu	
2006	Shoonya	Arindam Mitra	Bengali	
2008	The Last Lear	Rituparno Ghosh	English	
2008	Via Darjeeling	Arindam Nandy	Hindi	
2008	Khela	Rituparno Ghosh	Bengali	
2009	Antaheen	Aniruddha Roy Chowdhury	Bengali	
2010	Abohomaan	Rituparno Ghosh	Bengali	
2010	Ekti Tarar Khonje	Avik Mukhopadhyay	Bengali	
2012	Bhooter Bhabishyat	Anik Dutta	Bengali	
2012	Chitrangada: The Crowning Wish	Rituparno Ghosh	Bengali	
2013	Ashchorjyo Prodeep	Anik Dutta	Bengali	
2013	Satyanweshi	Rituparno Ghosh	Bengali	
2013	Sunglass	Rituparno Ghosh	Bengali; Hindi	
2013	Kangal Malsat	Suman Mukhopadhyay	Bengali	
2014	Teenkahon	Bauddhayan Mukherji	Bengali	
2014	Kill Dil	Shaad Ali	Hindi	
2015	Rajkahini	Srijit Mukherji	Bengali	
2016	The Violin Player	Bauddhayan Mukherji	Bengali	
2016	Pink	Aniruddha Roy Chowdhury	Hindi	
2017	Meghnad Badh Rahasya	Anik Dutta	Bengali	
2018	October	Shoojit Sircar	Hindi	
2019	Badla	Sujoy Ghosh	Hindi	
2019	Bhobishyoter Bhoot	Anik Dutta	Bengali	
2019	Password	Kamaleshwar Mukherjee	Bengali	
2020	Borunbabur Bondhu	Anik Dutta	Bengali	
2020	Gulabo Sitabo	Shoojit Sircar	Hindi	
2021	Sardar Udham	Shoojit Sircar	Hindi	
2021	Deep6	Madhuja Mukherjee	Bengali	
2023	Lost	Aniruddha Roy Chowdhury	Hindi	
2023	Jaane Jaan	Sujoy Ghosh	Hindi	
2023	Kadak Singh	Aniruddha Roy Chowdhury	Hindi	
2024	I Want to Talk	Shoojit Sircar	Hindi	
2025	Dear Maa	Aniruddha Roy Chowdhury	Bengali	
2027	Inji Vellam †	Mani Ratnam	Tamil	

== Awards and nominations ==
=== National Film Awards ===
Year	Category	Film	Ref(s)
2003	Best Cinematography	Patalghar	
2004	Best Cinematography	Bhalo Theko	
2009	Best Cinematography	Antaheen	
2021	Best Cinematography	Sardar Udham	

=== Filmfare Awards ===
Year	Category	Film	Ref(s)
2021	Best Cinematography	Gulabo Sitabo	
2022	Best Cinematography	Sardar Udham	

=== IIFA Awards ===
Year	Category	Film	Ref(s)
2022	IIFA Award for Best Cinematography	Sardar Udham	
