= Bhobishyoter Bhoot =

2019 Indian comedy film by Anik Dutta

- Film poster
- Directed by: Anik Dutta
- Cinematography: Avik Mukhopadhyay
- Edited by: Arghyakamal Mitra
- Music by: Debojyoti Mishra
- Distributed by: Star Synergy Entertainment
- Release date: 15 February 2019
- Country: India
- Language: Bengali

Bhobishyoter Bhoot (transl. Future Ghosts) is a 2019 Indian Bengali-language satirical comedy film directed by Anik Dutta. The film was released on 15 February 2019. Despite its similar topics, Dutta states that it is not a sequel to his film, Bhooter Bhabishyat (2012). All single and multiple screen theaters were stopped from showing the film immediately after release citing "orders from upper management". Various leading newspapers quoted unnamed sources, as well as Dutta, saying that the West Bengal police had issued these instructions to the theatres.

== Plot ==
Calcuttan ghosts were rendered homeless as many old haunted buildings were converted into multi-storey buildings and shopping malls. Various types of ghosts, such as politicians, extortionists, cabaret dancers, and Jatra actors, inhabit this world. Constantly confronted by the social and political issues of the present day, and further marginalised by their shrinking habitat in the real world, they speculate whether they should seek refuge in the virtual world or cyberspace for their survival. Some of them take shelter in a disused refugee camp. They plan to adapt themselves to the new world and fight against injustice, eventually finding a highly novel solution to their existential crisis.

== Cast ==
- Paran Banerjee as Mrityunjoy Biswas, Natasurjo
- Chandrayee Ghosh as Miss Rupali
- Barun Chanda as Harisadhan Ray aka Harry, the ghost of a manager of old British Mercantile Firm
- Sabyasachi Chakraborty as Bhuter raja
- Kaushik Sen as Ambubachi Dutta, a leader of the ruling political party
- Shataf Figar as Alex
- Chandan Sen as film producer.
- Shantilal Mukherjee as the editor of a popular newspaper
- Kanchan Mullick as Bhuto, a side role actor
- Debolina Dutta as Mokkhoda aka Motibai, an widow daner ghost who later become feminist
- Swastika Mukherjee in a guest appearance as ghost of Batabibala
- Rimjhim Mitra as a Ghost of an Singer
- Moon Moon Sen in a guest appearance as Madam Jessica aka Miss J, an Anglo-Indian dance trainer
- Kharaj Mukherjee in a guest appearance as Bishtu Mondal
- Rachel White as lead dancer in opening credit scenes
- Siddhartha Chatterjee as an organizer of Ghost-walk
- Badshah Maitra as Director Khonik
- Arunava Dutta as Biru, Production Manager
- Reshmi Sen as Sangeeta Sur, a ghost of Rabindra Sangeet artist
- Deboprasad Halder as assistant director
- Sumanta Mukherjee as Samyabrata Sarkar, the ghost of a left-wing party worker.
- Amit Saha as Bholanath Khara, an anti-social ghost who once used to be an artist.
- Sourav Chakraborty as Satyajit, a freelance investigating journalist
- Soumya Mukherjee as Ani
- Roja Paromita Dey as Renaissance
- Nimai Ghosh as Akshar Dutta
- Sumit Samaddar in a guest appearance
- Sibaji Bandopadhay as ghost-expert Nidhiram Banerjee aka Nidhu-babu
- Pradip Mitra as an organizer of Ghost-walk
- Sanjay Biswas in a guest appearance

== Controversy ==
Right after the release, the film was removed from different theatres in Kolkata. The de facto ban was accordingly criticised as "fascist" (by noted actor Soumitra Chatterjee and actor-director Aparna Sen), "condemnable" (by director Srijit Mukherji), "extremely undemocratic" (by economist and London School of Economics Professor Maitreesh Ghatak), and as an "infringement on one’s fundamental right to view a film" (by an editorial in The Statesman (India)). Other scholars and commentators termed the de facto ban "clearly unconstitutional" and in violation of Indian Supreme Court precedents, and an example of "liberal hypocrisy" (considering the ostensibly left-liberal credentials of the Chief Minister of West Bengal, Mamata Banerjee). When asked about the incident, Banerjee told the press: "I will not answer. Don’t ask me this question." Various processions and marches have been carried out to protest against the ban. A writ petition against the ban has been filed before the Calcutta High Court by film enthusiasts. The Supreme Court ordered the West Bengal government to pay compensation of Rs 20 lakh to Kalyanmoy Billy Chatterjee, producer of the film Bhobishyoter Bhoot, for imposing a “virtual ban” on the screening of the movie. The court also imposed a fine of Rs 1 lakh on the Mamata Banerjee-led government, "Free speech cannot be gagged for fear of the mob", the court said. It expressed concern over "growing intolerance" in society against artistic freedom.
