= Ka Kha Ga Gha =

2018 Indian Bengali film

- Theatrical release poster
- Directed by: Dr. Krishnendu Chatterjee
- Written by: Dr. Krishnendu Chatterjee
- Produced by: Dr. Krishna Mukhopadhyay
- Starring: Paran Bandopadhyay; Kaushik Ganguly; Mir Afsar Ali; Aparajita Auddy
- Cinematography: Joydeep Banerjee
- Edited by: Arghyakamal Mitra
- Music by: Anindya Chatterjee
- Production company: Krishna Movies
- Distributed by: Krishna Movies
- Release date: 9 March 2018
- Country: India
- Language: Bengali

Ka Kha Ga Gha (Bengali: ক খ গ ঘ) is an Indian Bengali-language comedy film written and directed by Dr. Krishnendu Chatterjee and produced by Dr. Krishna Mukhopadhyay under the banner of Krishna Movies. Ka Kha Ga Gha is about four young men Kalyan, an aspiring director, Kharaj, a script writer, Ganesh, an aspiring actor, and Ghanta, the antagonist in the team living in a dormitory. Samadarshi, Sourav, and Sayan played the lead roles in this venture. Actress Sayani Ghosh is seen essaying the leading lady opposite Sourav.

== Cast ==
- Samadarshi Dutta as Kalyan
- Iman Chakraborty as Kharaj
- Saurav Das as Ganesh
- Rj Sayan as Ghanta
- Kaushik Ganguly as Bhabotosh Sikhdar
- Paran Bandopadhyay as mess owner
- Mir Afsar Ali
- Aparajita Addhya
- Saayoni Ghosh
- Lama Halder
- Manashi Sinha
- Shovan Kamila

== Production ==
In early 2017, director Dr. Krishnendu Chatterjee penned the script. The shooting was completed in a month's time.

== Marketing ==
The first teaser was released on 20 January 2018. The film's official poster was launched at the Level Seven Rooftop Lounge. The trailer of the film was released on February 19, 2018.

== Release ==
The film was released on March 9, 2018, at Nandan.

== Soundtrack ==
Anindya Chatterjee has composed and penned all the songs of the film.

Ka Kha Ga Gha

Soundtrack album by Anindya Chatterjee
- Released: 2018
- Recorded: 2018
- Genre: Feature film soundtrack
- Length: 4:14
- Label: Krishna Movies
- Producer: Krishna Movies

Singles from Ka Kha Ga Gha
- 1. "Naam Na Jana Pakhi" Released: 22 Feb 2018

| No. | Title | Artist (s) | Length |
|---|---|---|---|
| 1. | "Naam Na Jana Pakhi (Duet)" | Shreya Ghoshal, Arijit Singh | 04:07 |
| 2. | "Naam Na Jana Pakhi (Male)" | Arijit Singh | 04:07 |
| 3. | "Naam Na Jana Pakhi (Female)" | Shreya Ghoshal | 04:07 |
| 4. | "Chal Suru Action" | Anindya Chatterjee, Sidhu (singer), Soumitra (singer), Upal (singer) | 03:16 |
| 5. | "Ka Kha Ga Gha Mission" | Rupam Islam | 02:56 |
| 6. | "Kuchur Muchur" | Prashmita | 03:46 |

== Reception ==
=== Critical reception ===
Bhaskar Chattopadhyay of the Firstpost reviewed the film and wrote "Ka Kha Ga Gha director Krishnendu Chatterjee may do well to remember that what works on television does not work in cinema, and that it is very difficult to make a simple film." He criticized the poorly written jokes, jarring transitions, weak editing but praised the music and the writing.
