= Gosainbaganer Bhoot =

2011 film by Nitish Roy

- Film Poster
- Directed by: Nitish Roy
- Screenplay by: Debaditya Datta
- Story by: Shirshendu Mukhopadhyay
- Produced by: Mou Raychowdhury
- Starring: Victor Banerjee; Ashish Vidyarthi; Kanchan Mullick; Tinu Anand
- Cinematography: Badal Sarkar
- Edited by: Malay Laha
- Music by: Chandrabindoo
- Distributed by: V3g Films Pvt. Ltd.
- Release date: 30 December 2011
- Country: India
- Language: Bengali

Gosaibaganer Bhoot (English: The Phantom Of Gosaibagan Grove, Bengali: গোঁসাইবাগানের ভূত) is a 2011 Indian Bengali-language comedy horror film directed by Nitish Roy, based on a novel by Bengali writer Shirshendu Mukhopadhyay. The music/lyrics was composed by Bengali brand Chandrabindoo.

== Plot ==
The film tells the story of Burun, who is hopelessly weak at mathematics and has to take lessons from an eccentric teacher, Karali Sir. However, all is not well in Burun's world, and he strays into Gosainbagan, where he befriends an enduring ghost, Nidhiram Sardar, only to later battle an evil force known as Habu.

== Cast ==
- Dedipya Ganguly as Burun
- Kanchan Mullick as Nidhiram (Ghost)
- Biswajit Chakraborty as Sachin Sarkar (Head Master)
- Tinu Anand as Manmatha Ukil
- Paran Bandyopadhyay as Korali Master
- Shankar Chakraborty as Godai Daroga
- Ashish Vidyarthi as Habu Sardar
- Saswata Chatterjee as Bhelu Daktar
- Dwijen Bandopadhyay as Panchkori Adhya
- Kharaj Mukherjee as Damodar Kaka
- Biplab Chatterjee as Kailash Mitra
- Locket Chatterjee as Burun's Mother
- Antony as Gosaibaba
- Victor Banerjee as Ram Kobiraj
- Sajal Haldar as Fatik
- Dakshina Chakraborty as Beli

== Music ==
=== Soundtrack ===
Gosainbaganer Bhoot

Soundtrack album by Chandrabindoo
- Released: 9 December 2011
- Genre: Feature film soundtrack
- Length: 30:00
- Label: Times Music
- Producer: Mou Raychowdhury

| No. | Title | Singer(s) | Length |
|---|---|---|---|
| 1. | "Aamaar Bhoot Sob Nikhut" | Upal Sengupta, Anindya Chatterjee, Shubhendu, Surojit Mukherjee | 03.49 |
| 2. | "Ek Je Chhilo Burun" | Pratul Mukherjee | 02.07 |
| 3. | "Nidhiram-ke Paakrao" | Upal, Anindya, Kharaj Mukherjee, Chandril Bhattacharya, Surojit, Saagnik, Subhalaxmi, Sanchari, Tito, Tiyasha | 03.39 |
| 4. | "Burun Tumi Anke Tero" | Subhalaxmi, Debasmita, Dipan, Tiyasha, Surojit, Biswanath, Chandril | 04.08 |
| 5. | "Kutu Bhoot" | Tiyasha, Upal | 04.01 |
| 6. | "Maar Maar Kaat Kaat" | Kharaj, Upal, Anindya, Biswanath, Surojit, Bidipta | 01.49 |
| 7. | "Haabu Haalum" | Silajit Majumder, Upal, Saagnik, Surojit, Tito, Bidipta | 02.51 |
| 8. | "Ek Je Chhilo Burun" | Joy | 02.09 |
| 9. | "Burun Tumi Anke Tero" (Singalong Track) | | 04.17 |
| 10. | "Kutu Bhoot" (Singalong Track) | | 04.01 |

== See also ==
- Chhayamoy
