= Gang of Ghosts =

2014 Indian film

- Theatrical release poster
- Directed by: Satish Kaushik
- Written by: Satish Kaushik; Rajesh Chawla
- Based on: Bhooter Bhabishyat by Anik Dutta
- Produced by: Venus Records & Tapes Pvt Ltd, The Satish Kaushik Entertainment
- Starring: Sharman Joshi; Parambrata Chatterjee; Mahi Gill; Anupam Kher; Meera Chopra; Vijay Varma; J. Brandon Hill; Rajesh Khattar; Saurabh Shukla; Rajpal Yadav; Yashpal Sharma; Vijay Verma; Chunky Pandey; Jackie Shroff
- Cinematography: Johny Lal
- Edited by: Hemal Kothari
- Music by: Dharam-Sandeep
- Release date: 21 March 2014
- Running time: 128 minutes
- Country: India
- Language: Hindi

Gang of Ghosts is a 2014 Hindi horror comedy film, produced by Venus Records & Tapes Pvt. Ltd. and The Satish Kaushik Entertainment. Directed by Satish Kaushik, it is a remake of Bengali film Bhooter Bhabishyat (Future of the ghosts).

== Plot ==
A story about a group of ghosts who have lost their shelter due to urbanization. The story that the stranger narrates shows the communal, social, linguistic and historical differences among the ghosts, as they belong to different eras.

It starts with a struggling wannabe film director entering the Royal Mansion in the motive of shooting for a movie of title "Hot Haryanvi" for which he can't decide about the ending. There a stranger comes past the guard to meet the director claiming that he is a writer and has a wonderful story worth making a movie. But, the director brushes him off. The writer Raju again confronts the director in order to make him listen to his story. The director finally agrees but on a condition that the writer will have to listen to his story first.

Raju writer listens to his story but doesn't like it and tells him to throw his story into a dustbin. The director then listens to Raju writer's story. He starts his story by saying about the relation of Mumbai's social and industrial works with the spirits or ghosts staying in the houses, trees, etc., and how their homes are lost. Then he shifts to Raibahadur Seth Gendamal Hemraj who owns a large Mill and is also the owner of the Royal Mansion. The mill workers angry by Gendamal's friendly relation with the Britishers, set out to burn the mill in which Gendamal was present, burning him to death. His ghost now stays at his own Royal Mansion. Then Raju tells about Mr. Ramsey who had a habit of reading and at that time the Indians were struggling for the fight for Independence and threw a bomb at him to his death. He contacted his once upon a time boss Mr. Booth who asks Gendamal to let Ramsey stay at the Royal Mansion to which Gendamal agrees.

Raju then tells the director that Gendamal had a younger brother Gulab Chand who was dating a famous actress at that time Manoranjana Kumari. She wanted Gulab to marry her and he also agrees with to soon marry each other. But Gulab betrays her by marrying a rich girl. So she gets depresses and drinks a lot due to which she hangs herself and dies. Gendamal allows her to stay at the Royal Mansion. Gulab also dies after being shot by gangsters but Gendamal denies his request to stay at the mansion. Soon Gendamal and Ramsey conduct an audition for eligible ghosts in search of shelter. They select only 10 to 15 ghosts as the Mansion would be overcrowded. All live happily in the Royal Mansion with each other with some ghosts flirting with Manoranjana and others doing their own works.

Until one day, they come to know that a businessman named Mr. Bhuteria is planning to demolish the Mansion to build a grand mall in its place. The ghosts plan together to not let him achieve his goal. Manoranjana goes to Bhuteria by another name to pull out some information from Bhuteria where he tells her of his wife Lakshmi who died and still haunts him in his dreams.

He then reveals to Manoranjana that he actually killed her. Bhuteria turns to find Manoranjana is not there. A ghost named Babu Hatkata goes to Bhuteria to tell him that he knows of his plots and invites him to the Royal Mansion to speak with Gendamal. There he enjoys a party organised by the ghosts and learns that one of the dancers is his Lakshmi and they reveal that they are all ghosts and Gendamal also tells him that if he makes a mall then they will be homeless and tells him to get out of the mansion.

Bhuteria returns to the mansion and returns the original documents of the mansion and never comes back again.

== Cast ==
- Sharman Joshi as Raju Writer
- Parambrata Chatterjee as Director
- Mansee Deshmukh as Tania (AD)
- Sangeetha Khonayat as Heroine
- Mahi Gill as Manoranjana Kumari
- Anupam Kher as Raibahadur Seth Gendamal Hemraj
- Asrani as Atmaram
- Meera Chopra as Tina Chopra
- J. Brandon Hill as Mr. Ramsey
- Rajesh Khattar as Bhuteria
- Pretie Lad as Lakshmi (wife of Bhuteria)
- Saurabh Shukla as Bhoothnath Bhaduri
- Rajpal Yadav as Akbar Khwaja Khan
- Yashpal Sharma as Brigadier Hoshiar Singh
- Vijay Varma as Robin Hoodda
- Chunky Pandey as Gulab Chand
- Jackie Shroff as Babu Hatkata
- Lankesh Bhardwaj as Salim Fatela

Guest Appearances

- Paoli Dam (Item Number)
- Aniruddh Dave
- Sonal Tanna
- Amit Pathak
- Jeetendra Bhora
- Amit Pathak
- Jitendra Bohra
- Pradeep Nagar
- Sharad Ponkshe
- Anil Saxena
- Aloke Sengupta
- Chintan Takkar
- Vibhuti Jaiswal
- Rutwij Vaidya
- Jack dhaliwal
- Ankur Malhotra

== Soundtrack ==
The film's soundtrack was composed by Dharam Sandeep, while lyrics were by Satish Kaushik, Vikas Kumar, Qateel Shifai and Rashmi Singh.

1. "Dasni Sharab Di" - Aamir Ghulam Ali, Malkoo, AK the Punjabi Rapper, Deepali Sathe shot on Paoli Dam
2. "Ishq Behn Ka Dinna" - Vikas Kumar, Vishvesh Parmar
3. "Jaayen To Jaayen Kahan" - Manoj Mishra
4. "Naach Madhubala" - Aishwarya Nigam
5. "Nahin Dungi" - Rupmatii Jolly
6. "Parody" - Sudesh Bhosle, Aishwarya Nigam, Manoj Mishra, Abhishek Nailwal, Aditi Paul
7. "Machis Ki Tilli" - Malini Banerjee, Jonita Gandhi, Aishwarya Nigam, Sandeep Patil shot on Mahi Gill, Meera Chopra, Pretie Lad
8. "Sheeshe Ka Dil" - Rupmatii Jolly

== Production ==
70% of the shooting of the film took place in Surat.
