= Anuranan =

- Theatrical release poster
- Directed by: Aniruddha Roy Chowdhury
- Written by: Aniruddha Roy-Chowdhury; Gaurabh Pandey
- Produced by: Jeet Banerjee, Indrani Mukerjee, Mehmood Ali, Aniruddha Roy-Chowdhury
- Starring: Rahul Bose; Rituparna Sengupta; Raima Sen; Rajat Kapoor
- Cinematography: Sunil Patel
- Release dates: November 2006; 1 February 2008 (US)
- Language: Bengali

Anuranan (English: Resonance) is the directorial debut by Bengali language romantic drama film by debut filmmaker Aniruddha Roy Chowdhury. The film premiered at the 2006 International Film Festival of India.

Anuranan (meaning "resonance" in Bengali) explores the relationships of two married couples, and the impacts and consequences of their relationships.

== Synopsis ==
Rahul, a creative and sensitive individual, arrives at a lonely hill station in Sikkim to help build a new holiday resort. The friendship between the two couples, Rahul and Nandita and Amit and Preeti, paves the way for a deeper bond between Rahul and Preeti. Towards the end of the movie, this "anuranan" between the two is misunderstood by society, including Amit. This misunderstanding intensifies when Rahul suddenly dies, leaving Nandita lonely. The fact that the love between Rahul and Nandita was pure does not prevent Nandita from falling prey to the rumors as well. All the four main characters are depicted as lost and lonely.

== Awards and prizes ==
- 2008 – 54th (Indian) National Film Awards, Winner (Best Feature Film in Bengali)
- 2008 – Santa Cruz Film Festival, Emerging Filmmaker Award (Aniruddha Roy-Choudhury)

== Cast ==
- Rahul Bose as Rahul
- Rituparna Sengupta as Nandita
- Raima Sen as Preeti
- Rajat Kapoor as Amit
- Haradhan Bandopadhyay as Nandita's Father
- Dolly Basu as Preeti's mother
- Mithu Chakraborty as Nandita's sister
- Barun Chanda as Mr Guha
- Jacqui Dawson as Roda
- Laura Price as Victoria
- Peter Wear as Rahul's boss in London

== Production ==
The film was shot on location in India and the UK. Director Aniruddha Roy-Chowdhury describes the scenery of the hill station in the mountains as making the Kanchenjunga "the third character" in the movie.

== Songs ==
The film features music composed by tabla player Tanmoy Bose.

1. "Yeh Gagin" – Rituparna Sengupta, Rahul Bose, Rashid Khan, Anushua Chowdhurry
2. "Bahi Bahikisi" – Rajarshi Chatterjee
3. "Mere Pritam" – Kartik Das Baul
