= Teenkahon =

- Directed by: Bauddhayan Mukherji
- Screenplay by: Abhinandan Banerjee; Bauddhayan Mukherji
- Story by: Bibhutibhushan Mukhopadhyay; Syed Mustafa Siraj; Bauddhayan Mukherji
- Produced by: Monalisa Mukherji
- Starring: See below
- Cinematography: Abhik Mukhopadhyay
- Edited by: Arghyakamal Mitra
- Music by: Arnab Chakraborty
- Production company: Little Lamb Films
- Distributed by: Viacom18
- Release dates: 7 November 2014 (Seattle South Asian Film Festival); 11 September 2015 (Kolkata)
- Running time: 124 minutes
- Country: India
- Language: Bengali
- Budget: ₹1.5 crore (US$160,000)

Teenkahon (Three Obsessions) is a 2014 Psychological mystery-thriller Bengali film directed by Bauddhayan Mukherji and produced by Monalisa Mukherji under the banner of Little Lamb Films.

== Cast ==
- Suman Mukhopadhyay as Shailen (Senior)
- Kharaj Mukherjee as Radhanath
- Ratan Sarkhel as Tarapada
- Manasi Sinha as Radhanath's wife
- Bhadra Basu as Pishima
- Biswanath Basu as Akshay
- Monu Mukhopadhyay as Gurumoshai
- Ananya Sen as Nayantara
- Barshan Seal as Shailen (Junior)
- Parvathy Baul as Baul
- Joy Sengupta as Sukomol Basu Roy
- Sabyasachi Chakraborty as Gyanesh Mitra
- Phalguni Chatterjee as Mejo Mama
- Rituparna Sengupta as Anamika Guha
- Ashish Vidyarthi as Joydeb Guha
- Dhritiman Chatterjee as Dr Banerjee
- Sumanta Mukherjee as Ronojoy Dutta
- Kaushik Mukherjee as Deepak Addhya
- Sarada Banerjee as Noni
- Panchanan Banerjee as Chowdhury
- Madhuparna Kumar as Ex-speaker's ex-wife
- Pratirup Ghosh as Ayush (Junior)

== Themes ==
Teenkahon is a triptych film. The Gulf Today described it as "a rare international art house film from Bengal which, as a piece of social document, tries to capture the changing face of morality, the degeneration of values, the increasing pollution of the spoken language and the changing social fabric of Bengal through three stories."

== Production ==
=== Development ===
Teenkahon is the first film of Little Lamb Films, the production house founded by Bauddhayan Mukherji.

=== Filming ===
Filming locations include places in West Bengal such as Kolkata and Bolpur.

== Release ==
"This fest (DC Independent Film Festival) doesn't believe in showing hundred or more films like mainstream festivals. In the narrative feature category, they've chosen just eight films from across the world. Teenkahon is the only one from Asia in the competition section and it's a rare honour for a Bengali film."

— Bauddhayan Mukherji, in an interview.

Teenkahon was the only Asian film which was showcased in the prestigious DC Independent Film Festival in 2015. Director Bauddhayan Mukherji was also one of the few selected filmmakers who took part in the summit hosted by US Congressional Entertainment Industries Caucus, the topic of which was the use of drones in films and policy decisions on the usage guidelines. The seminar was presided over by American politician Brad Sherman.

Teenkahon is slated for a theatrical release on 11 September 2015 in India.

=== Festival screenings ===
Teenkahon was screened at the following film festivals in 2015.

- Festival du Film d'Asie du Sud Transgressif, Paris, France
- DC Independent Film Festival, Washington, D.C.
- Indian Panorama, International Film Festival of India, Goa, India
- MAMI, Mumbai Film Festival, Mumbai, India
- Indian Film Festival of Stuttgart, Stuttgart, Germany
- Soho International Film Festival, New York, USA
- Bridge Film Fest, Mitrovica, Kosovo
- Bengali Film Festival, Dubai
- ImagineIndia International Film Festival, Madrid, Spain
- Pune International Film Festival, Pune, India
- Indian Film Festival of Melbourne, Melbourne, Australia
- Zimbabwe International Film Festival, Harare, Zimbabwe
- Seattle South Asian Film Festival, Seattle, USA
- Chennai International Film Festival, Chennai, India
- Cannes Underground Film Festival,
- North Carolina International South Asian Film Festival, North Carolina, USA
- Habitat Film Festival, New Delhi, India
- Madrid International Film Festival, Madrid, Spain
- Hyderabad Bengali Film Festival, Hyderabad, India
- Berlin Underground Film Festival
- Navi Mumbai International Film Festival, Navi Mumbai, India
- National Film Festival, Kozhikode, India

== Music ==
Teenkahon

Soundtrack album by Arnab Chakrabarty
- Released: 2014
- Genre: Feature film soundtrack

Playback singer Arnab Chakraborty was chosen to compose the film score for Teenkahon. The film will be his debut as a music composer. Singer Shreya Ghoshal was reported to record a song for the film.

== Accolades ==
Teenkahon went on to receive multiple awards in various international film festivals, being the only Bengali film in consideration in most cases. It won a Special Mention Award from six student jury members in Paris. Director Bauddhayan Mukherji was bestowed with the Aravindan Puraskaram for Best Debutant Director by Beena Paul, receiving a cash prize of ₹25,000 (US$260), a certificate and a statuette.

Award	Category	Recipients and nominees	Result
Festival du Film d'Asie du Sud Transgressif	Special Mention of the Student Jury for Best Narrative Feature	Bauddhayan Mukherji	Won
Kerala State Chalachitra Academy	Aravindan Puraskaram	Bauddhayan Mukherji	Won
