= Borunbabur Bondhu =

2020 Indian Bengali film

- Film poster
- Directed by: Anik Dutta
- Screenplay by: Anik Datta; Utsav Mukherjee
- Based on: Chhad by Ramapada Chowdhury
- Produced by: Surinder Films
- Starring: Soumitra Chatterjee; Madhabi Mukhopadhyay; Paran Bandopadhyay; Ritwick Chakraborty; Arpita Chatterjee
- Cinematography: Avik Mukhopadhyay
- Edited by: Arghyakamal Mitra
- Music by: Debojyoti Mishra
- Production company: Surinder Films
- Release dates: 9 November 2019 (KIFF); 28 February 2020 (India)
- Country: India
- Language: Bengali

Borunbabur Bondhu is a 2019 Bengali-language Indian drama film directed by Anik Dutta for Surinder Films. The film is based on a Bengali story Chhad written by Ramapada Chowdhury. It is the story of an old man, whose life faces an upheaval after people come to know that a VVIP who was once his friend, is coming for a visit. The film stars Soumitra Chatterjee in the role of an elderly man with supporting cast of Madhabi Mukhopadhyay, Paran Bandopadhyay, Ritwick Chakraborty, Arpita Chatterjee, Sreelekha Mitra, Kaushik Sen and Bidipta Chakraborty.

The film was screened at the 25th Kolkata International Film Festival in 2019, the Third Eye Asian Film Festival, Mumbai in March 2020, and the Indian Film Festival of Cincinnati, Ohio on 21 October 2020.

== Cast ==
- Soumitra Chatterjee
- Madhabi Mukherjee
- Paran Bandyopadhyay
- Ritwick Chakraborty
- Kaushik Sen
- Sreelekha Mitra
- Debolina Dutta
- Arpita Chatterjee

== Release ==
The film premiered at the 25th Kolkata International Film Festival in 2019, and released to theatres on 10 January 2020.

== Reception ==
The film received critical acclaim. In Anandabazar Patrika, Urmimala Basu called this film "a must watch movie" and praised its direction, screenplay, ensemble cast, music and cinematography. In The Times of India, Debolina Sen called this film "a rare gem" and praised its direction, screenplay and ensemble cast. In Film Companion, Sankhayan Ghosh called this film "surprisingly political" and praised its screenplay.

== Awards ==
- WBFJA Award for Best Film
- WBFJA Award for Best Director- Anik Dutta
- WBFJA Award for Best Supporting Actor- Paran Bandyopadhyay
- WBFJA Award for Best Editor- Arghyakamal Mitra
- Filmfare Awards Bangla 2021 for Best Director - Anik Dutta
- Filmfare Awards Bangla 2021 for Best Film
- Filmfare Awards Bangla 2021 for Best Dialogue - Anik Dutta and Utsav Mukherjee
