= Raja Narayan Deb =

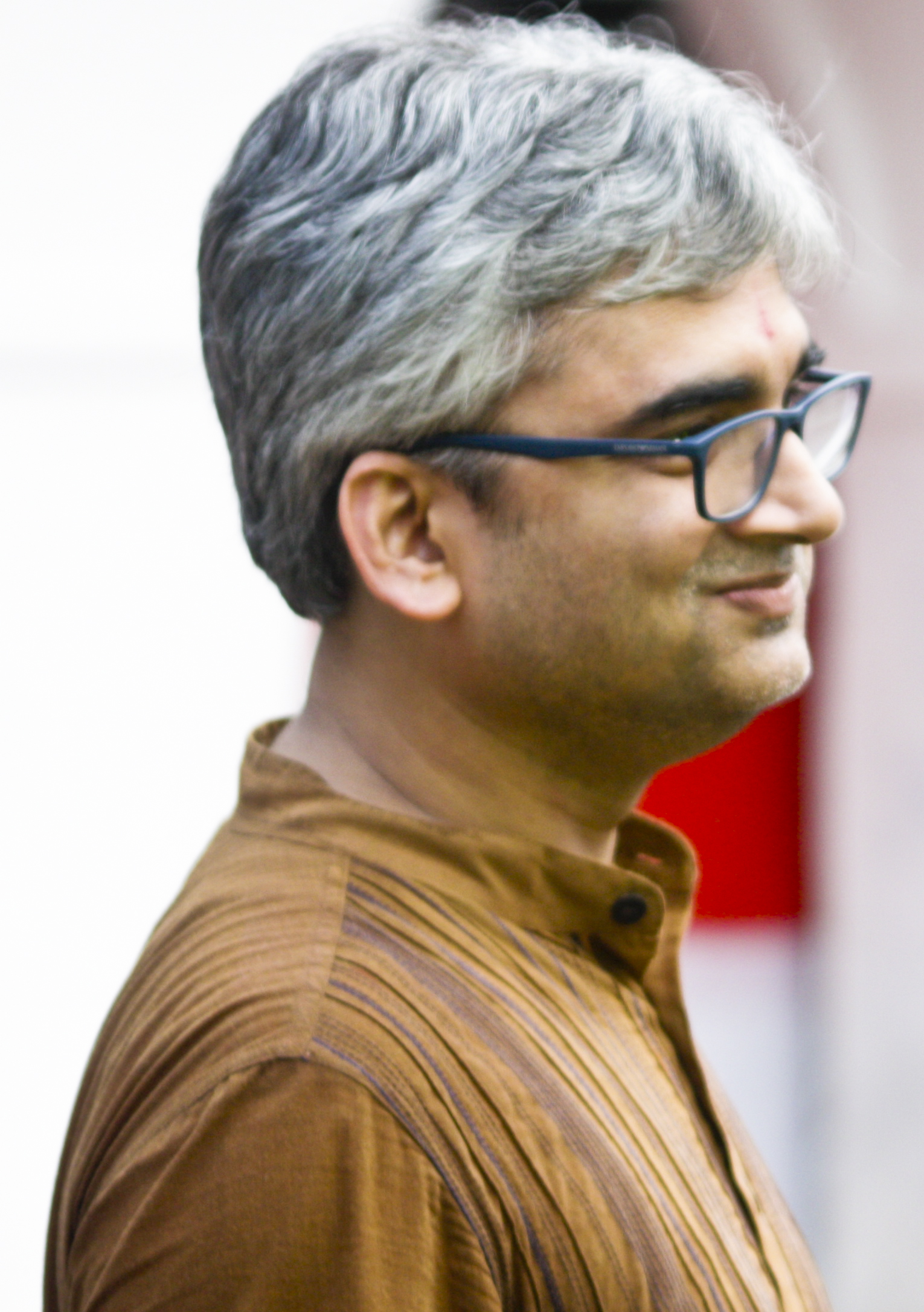
- Deb in October 2016

Background information
- Genre: Film score
- Occupations: film score composer, singer, music director
- Instruments: Piano, Harmonium, Keyboard
- Years active: 2008–2012

Raja Narayan Deb (Bengali: রাজা নারায়ণ দেব) is an Indian music director, composer working in the Bengali film industry. He is a member of the Shobhabazar Rajbari. He was a member of the Bangla band "Parash Pathar".

== Discography ==
=== As a music director ===
- Khela (2008)
- Shob Charitro Kalponik (2009)
- Clerk (2010)
- Noukadubi (2011)
- Kashmakash (2011)
- Bhooter Bhabishyat (2012)
- Balukabela.com (2012)
- Kidnapper (2013)
- C/O Sir (2013)
- Bangla Naache Bhangra (2013)
- Mukti... (2013)
- Ashchorjyo Prodeep (2013)
- Nirbashito (2014)
- Jodi Love Dile Na Prane (2014)
- Sangabora (2016)
- Khoj (2017 film) (2017)
- Typewriter (TV series) (2018)
- Andarkahini: Self-exile (2019)

=== As a background music composer ===
- Manojder Adbhut Bari (2018), Bengali cinema.
- My Story (2018), Malayalam film.
- Life Express (2010)
- 033 (2010)
- Aamar Aami (2014)
- Bawal (2015)
- "Andarkahini: Self-exile" (2019)

=== As a playback singer ===
- Abohomaan (2010)
