= Tezpur Industrial Bank =

The Tezpur Industrial Bank, established on 6 June 1918, was the first commercial bank in the erstwhile Assam province of British India. It was established as a joint stock private limited company and was converted into a public limited company in 1921.

The bank was founded with the aim of promoting local industry and commerce, mostly tea industry in the region, which was predominantly agrarian at the time. It played a crucial role in providing banking and financial services to businesses and individuals, fostering economic development in Tezpur and neighboring areas.

Following the First World War, an economic depression led to the closure of nearly 800-1000 loan offices in Bengal. Despite its substantial advances against agricultural land, the Tezpur Industrial Bank managed to navigate through this crisis successfully. Similarly, during the tea crisis of 1920–1922, which was one of the worst crises faced by the industry, the bank had approximately 75% of its investments in tea, including block mortgages and crop hypothecation. Even with such concentrated exposure, it managed to stay afloat.

In 1961, the Tezpur Industrial Bank merged with the United Bank of India (UBI), as part of a larger consolidation effort in the Indian banking sector. The merger was instrumental in expanding the reach of UBI into northeastern India, integrating the financial operations of the region into a broader national framework.
