= Anik Dutta =

Bengali film director (1961–2026)

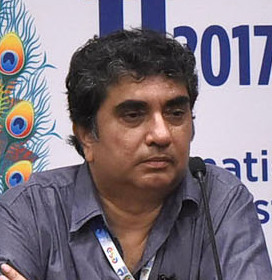
- Dutta at the IFFI in 2017
- Born: 22 May 1960; Kolkata, West Bengal, India
- Died: 27 May 2026 (aged 66); Lake Town, Kolkata, West Bengal, India
- Citizenship: India
- Education: St. Xavier's College, Kolkata; Patha Bhavan, Kolkata
- Occupation: Film director
- Years active: 2009–2026
- Relatives: Narendra Chandra Dutta (Grandfather)

Anik Dutta (Note: Spelling according to The Times of India) (22 May 1960 – 27 May 2026) was an Indian Bengali film director who made his official directorial debut in 2012 Bengali film Bhooter Bhabishyat. In 2012 he started working on a film on Shirshendu Mukhopadhyay's novel Aschorjo Prodip. Dutta was the grandson of Narendra Chandra Dutta, the founder of United Bank of India.

== Life and career ==
Anik Dutta was born on 22 May 1960 in Debdoot Sheet Nagar, Calcutta, West Bengal, India. He was the grandson of Narendra Chandra Dutta, the founder of United Bank of India. He was highly influenced by Satyajit Ray's style of filmmaking. His films often paid nod to Ray's works.

Dutta died by suicide by jumping from the roof of his house on 27 May 2026, at the age of 66, five days after his birthday.

== Filmography ==
Year	Film	Director	Writer	Notes
2012	Bhooter Bhabishyat	Yes	Yes	
2013	Aschorjo Prodip	Yes	No	
2014	Gang of Ghosts	No	Yes	Hindi remake of Bhooter Bhabishyat
2017	Meghnad Badh Rahasya	Yes	Yes	
2019	Bhobishyoter Bhoot	Yes	Yes	
2020	Borunbabur Bondhu	Yes	Yes	
2022	Aparajito	Yes	Yes	
2025	Joto Kando Kolkatatei	Yes	Yes	

== Awards ==
- Anandalok Awards for Best Director for Bhooter Bhabishyat
- Zee Bangla Gourav Samman Award for Best Directorial Debut for Bhooter Bhabishyat
- Zee Bangla Gourav Samman Award for Best Screenplay & Dialogue for Bhooter Bhabishyat
- West Bengal Film Journalists' Association Awards for Best Director for Borunbabur Bondhu, 2022
- Filmfare Awards East for Best Director for Borunbabur Bondhu
- Filmfare Awards East for Best Dialogue for Borunbabur Bondhu
- Best Director for Aparajito (2022 film) at West Bengal Film Journalists' Association Award for Best Director 2023.
