= Meghnad Badh Rahasya =

2017 Indian film by Anik Dutta

- Theatrical release poster
- মেঘনাদবধ রহস্য
- Directed by: Anik Dutta
- Produced by: Firdausul Hasan; Probal Halder
- Starring: Sabyasachi Chakraborty; Abir Chatterjee; Gargi Roychowdhury; Sayani Ghosh; Vikram Chatterjee
- Cinematography: Avik Mukhopadhyay
- Edited by: Arghyakamal Mitra
- Music by: Debojyoti Mishra
- Production company: Friends Communication
- Release date: 14 July 2017
- Running time: 122 minutes
- Country: India
- Language: Bengali

Meghnad Badh Rahasya (transl. The Mystery of the Murder of Meghnad) is a 2017 Indian Bengali-language suspense thriller film directed by Anik Dutta with Debojyoti Mishra as music director. It was the third movie of Dutta which was released on 14 July 2017. It is said that the film was loosely based on Meghnad Badh Kavya with a few legendary references from The Ramayana.

== Plot ==
Famous writer Professor Asimavo Bose disappears under mysterious circumstances. All his allies including his wife Indrani, son Wrik, step-daughter Guli, assistant Elena and nephew Dheeman, have some ulterior motive of harming him. Asimavo was a political activist while he was still a student and has his own share of secrets that reveal his dark past. The only clue to this mystery is a copy of Meghnad Badh Kavya which he gets as an unnamed gift on his birthday. The question remains: who did it? how? and most importantly, why?

== Cast ==
- Sabyasachi Chakrabarty as Prof. Asimavo Bose
- Abir Chatterjee as Kunal Sen
- Gargi Roychowdhury as Indrani Bose
- Vikram Chatterjee as Wrik Bose
- Saayoni Ghosh as Elena
- Kamaleshwar Mukherjee as Badal Biswas
- Sauraseni Maitra as Guli, Asimavo's step-daughter
- Kalyan Ray as Asimavo's friend
- Swati Sengupta as Janaki
