= Antaheen =

- Film poster
- Directed by: Aniruddha Roy Chowdhury
- Written by: Shyamal Sengupta
- Produced by: Jeet Banerjee; Aniruddha Roy Chowdhury; Indrani Mukerjee; Executive producer - Neha Rungta
- Starring: Radhika Apte; Rahul Bose; Mita Vashisth; Aparna Sen; Sharmila Tagore
- Cinematography: Abhik Mukhopadhyay
- Edited by: Arghyakamal Mitra
- Music by: Shantanu Moitra
- Distributed by: Mumbai Mantra
- Release date: 23 January 2009
- Running time: 120 minutes
- Country: India
- Language: Bengali

Antaheen (sometimes dubbed in English as The Endless Wait) is a 2009 Bengali romantic drama film directed by Aniruddha Roy Chowdhury. The film stars Radhika Apte, Rahul Bose, Mita Vashisth, Aparna Sen, Kalyan Ray and Sharmila Tagore. The film also marked the lead debut of actress Radhika Apte.

== Plot ==
Abhik Chowdhury is an honest, upright, yet caring IPS Officer. After witnessing the tragedies of life, he loses faith in the real relationships that he sees around him, and seeks solace in the virtual world. Through this, Abhik develops an online friendship with a young woman, without knowing any real information about her. That woman is Brinda - a young, dynamic television journalist who comes from a conventional middle-class family. While the relationship blossoms within the confines of two computer screens, Abhik gets his fifteen minutes of fame on national television, when he successfully masterminds a raid on a consignment of illegal arms. Brinda telephones him to ask for an on-camera interview, but Abhik declines sharply. The virtual friends have a frosty first meeting in the real world, at the launch of a controversial mega project of a big-time real estate entrepreneur. Unaware that she knows Abhik so well on the internet, Brinda, still smarting from Abhik's refusal to be interviewed, gets into a bitter exchange of words with him, which escalates into a heated argument. Before leaving in a huff, Brinda overhears a piece of conversation between two men about Mehra's project. This gives her a lead to a potentially big scoop.

Ranjan and Paromita (Paro), an estranged couple, become the bridge between Brinda and Abhik. Ranjan is Abhik's cousin, who also acts as his philosopher and guide. Ranjan is a high-stakes stock market addict, and leads a lonely life after having separated from Paro a few years ago. Ranjan is acutely sensitive and perceptive, while also being bitter and cynical on the surface. Paro is a senior marketing executive at the channel for which Brinda works. Paro secretly organises a birthday party for Ranjan, and Brinda and Abhik meet once again. Their initial irritation wears off and they soon become friends. The mood of the party turns romantic yet poignant, as Paro and Ranjan attempt to reconcile. Online, Brinda and Abhik's virtual friendship continues unabated, even though their identities remain undisclosed and they are both unaware that they have met.

Abhik confides in Ranjan that he is probably falling in love, with someone whose name is unknown to him. Ranjan warns Abhik with his usual cynicism about the perils and pains that often comes with love. Behind his sardonic comments, Abhik gets a glimpse of Ranjan's sensitivity and loneliness. After hearing his cousin's advice, Abhik leaves feeling confused, yet is still not convinced enough to stop falling further in love. Paro gets a lucrative job offer from Mumbai, but she is in a dilemma between upgrading her career and staying back for lost love. As the crisis deepens in her mind, she seeks Ranjan's advice. Although it is bound to intensify his loneliness, Ranjan encourages her to shift to Mumbai, which hurts Paro. A series of upsetting events and the stresses of her personal life begins to weigh Brinda down. The only thing she can find solace is with her virtual friend. Brinda begins to notice some uncanny similarities between Abhik and her anonymous online friend, in the way they talk, and in their choice of phrase, etc. As she follows the leads given by Abhik, she manages to get an important interview lined up which may give her the proof to wrap up her story on Mehra's project. She finally wanted to meet her anonymous lover in real life. Abhik experiences a wide range of emotions but is ultimately nervous and eager. The night before her interview, on a particular phone conversation with Abhik she realises that he is in fact her online friend. That night, Brinda dies in her car on the way to work. Abhik is saddened to hear of Brinda's death and also suspicious when he notices that his online friend has stopped replying. At Brinda's funeral, he finally realises what has happened and is heartbroken.

== Cast ==
- Radhika Apte as Brinda
- Rahul Bose as DCDD Abhik Chowdhury
- Biswajit Chakraborty as Mr. Saha
- Barun Chanda as Dibakar
- Kaushik Ganguly as Mrinmoy
- Rudranil Ghosh as Tanmoy
- Shauvik Kundagrami as Mr. Mehra
- Kunal Padhy as Mr. Mukherjee
- Kalyan Ray as Ranjan
- Saswati Guhathakurta as Brinda's Mother
- Aparna Sen as Paro
- Arindam Sil as Sabya
- Sharmila Tagore as Abhik's aunt
- Mita Vasisht as Mrs. Mehra
- Sanjay Bhattacharya as Dr. Sanjay Bhattacharya
- Sugata Ghosh as Sugata Ghosh
- Ekavali Khanna as Ekkavali Khanna
- Jai Ranjan Ram as Dr. Jai Ranjan Ram
- Sabyasachi Sen as Dr. Sabyasachi Sen

Other Casts

- Anushree Acharya
- Sukanya Bhattacharya
- Jayshree Dasgupta
- Rajkumar Dutta
- Diya Guha
- Aparajita Majumdar
- Sudip Majumdar
- Pradip Rai
- Subhash Sarkar

== Production ==
The film was shot on a limited budget on location in Kolkata. Rahul Bose and Sharmila Tagore worked on the film for free and composer Shantanu Moitra waived his fee for composing the film's music.

== Awards ==
56th National Film Awards

- Best Feature Film
- Best Cinematography - Abhik Mukhopadhyay
- Best Lyrics - Anindya Chatterjee & Chandril Bhattacharya for "Pherari Mon..."
- Best Female Playback Singer - Shreya Ghoshal for "Pherari Mon..."

== Soundtracks ==
The lyrics were penned by Anindya Chatterjee and Chandril Bhattacharya. Shantanu Moitra is the music composer, while Shaan, Babul Supriyo, Shreya Ghosal, Srikanta Acharya, Antara Chowdhury and Pranab Biswas have lent their voices for this masterpiece of a soundtrack.

Track No.	Title	Writer	Music composer	Performed By	Courtesy(TM/C)
01.	Antaheen	Anindya Chatterjee and Chandril Bhattacharya	Shantanu Moitra	Shaan	Saregama
02.	Bhindeshi Tara	Anindya Chatterjee and Chandril Bhattacharya	Anindya Chatterjee	Anindya Chatterjee	Saregama
03.	Jao Pakhi	Anindya Chatterjee and Chandril Bhattacharya	Shantanu Moitra	Shreya Ghoshal and Pranab Biswas	Saregama
04.	Muthor Rumaal	Anindya Chatterjee and Chandril Bhattacharya	Shantanu Moitra	Antara Chowdhury and Srikanto Acharya	Saregama
05.	Pherari Mon	Anindya Chatterjee and Chandril Bhattacharya	Shantanu Moitra	Shreya Ghoshal and Babul Supriyo	Saregama
06.	Shokal Ashe Na	Anindya Chatterjee and Chandril Bhattacharya	Shantanu Moitra	Shreya Ghoshal	Saregama

== See also ==
- Bengali films of 2009
