= Bhooter Bhabishyat =

- Theatrical release poster
- Directed by: Anik Dutta
- Screenplay by: Anik Dutta, Deb Roy
- Story by: Anik Dutta
- Produced by: Joy Ganguly
- Starring: Sabyasachi Chakrabarty; Parambrata Chatterjee; Paran Bandopadhyay; Swastika Mukherjee; Sumit Samaddar; Biswajit Chakraborty; Mir Afsar Ali; Saswata Chatterjee; Sreelekha Mitra; Samadarshi Dutta
- Cinematography: Avik Mukhopadhyay
- Edited by: Arghyakamal Mitra
- Music by: Raja Narayan Deb
- Production companies: Satya Films; Mojo Productions
- Release dates: 16 March 2012 (West Bengal); 13 April 2012 (Delhi, Mumbai and Bangalore)
- Running time: 123 minutes
- Country: India
- Language: Bengali
- Budget: ₹0.6 crore (US$62,000)
- Box office: ₹3 crore (US$310,000) (100 days)

Bhooter Bhabishyat (ভূতের ভবিষ্যৎ English: Future of the ghost) is a 2012 Indian Bengali-language fantasy comedy horror film directed by Anik Dutta. The film became one of the biggest hits of 2012 among the Bengali films. It is a film with a supernatural element. It is the directorial debut of Anik Dutta. It was well received by various critics for its direction, and storyline.

== Plot ==
Ayan Sengupta, an ad director, visits a palace-like house for shooting his new ad. His dream is to make a movie but he doesn't have enough money. A man named Biplab Dasgupta, whom Ayan encounters in the house, narrates a story to him. The story is about an old decrepit house called the Chowdhury Mansion, which was haunted by the spirit of its last owner, before other wandering ghosts settled down.

A shooting of a movie named 'Antarjash' was happening where Madhumita Sanyal, the lead actress, lost consciousness during a shooting. When she regained consciousness, she said that she saw the reflection of an unknown woman in the mirror.

The first section of the story, describes the ghosts familiarizing with each other and as their initial hostility towards each other disappears, they start to regard each other as friends. Unfortunately, this atmosphere of peace and tranquility is destroyed when the ghosts discover that a greedy, plot dealer had made up his mind to convert the large, old house into a deluxe shopping mall. It is then upon the ghosts to figure out, how they will go about trying to save the house that granted them shelter, even after their deaths. Will they be able to save Chowdury Mansion from the prying eyes of the selfish dealer? Will Ayan be able to identify who this Biplab Dasgupta is and make his film debut?

== Cast (in order of appearance) ==
- Paran Bandopadhyay as Rai Bahadur Darpa Narayan Chowdhury, the ghost of a 19th century zamindar, and the creator of the mansion. He died at the hands of dacoits while on a trip to his zamindari estates in rural Bengal.
- Swastika Mukherjee as Kadalibala Dasi, the ghost of an actress from the 1940s who committed suicide after a failed love affair.
- Sumit Samaddar as Bhootnath Bhaduri, the ghost of a Bengali Hindu refugee from eastern Bengal fleeing the Noakhali riots.
- Sabyasachi Chakrabarty as Biplab Dasgupta, the story teller. He is actually the ghost of an CPIML cadre involved in the Naxalite uprising who was killed extra-judicially by the police in a fake encounter.
- George Baker as Sir Donald Ramsey, an Englishman's ghost who was killed by armed revolutionaries protesting against the Partition of Bengal.
- Mir Afsar Ali as Ganesh Bhutoria, the builder
- Udayshankar Pal as Atmaram Paswan, the ghost of a low-caste Bihari rickshawpuller who was crushed to death in a car accident.
- Pradip Dasgupta as Khwaja Khan, the ghost of the cook who served Siraj-ud-Daula who died in the Battle of Plassey.
- Samadarshi Dutta as Pablo Patranabis, the ghost of a rock musician who died due to drug overdose.
- Mumtaz Sorcar as Koel Dhar, the ghost of an industrialist's daughter who committed suicide on being denied by her father to marry her love, a gym trainer.
- Parambrata Chatterjee as Ayan Sengupta, an aspiring director
- Biswajit Chakraborty as Brigadier Yudhajit Sarkar, the ghost of an army officer who died during the Kargil War.
- Arunava Dutta as Nantu, Production Manager
- Ashes Bhattacharyya as lawyer of Ganesh Bhutoria
- Bibhu Bhattacharya as Sudhirbabu, caretaker of "Chowdhury Palace"
- Saswata Chatterjee as Haatkata Kartik, the ghost of criminal who was killed by his apprentice while in his sleep.
- Sreelekha Mitra as Madhumita Sanyal
- Monami Ghosh as Laxmi, the ghost of Bhutoria's wife who he burned for dowry.
- Kharaj Mukherjee as Pramod Pradhan aka Pod Podhan (Po'od P'odhan), a local goon with political connections.
- Sanjay Biswas as T. K. Guchait, Bhutoria's secretary
- Anindita Bose as Rinka
- Debdut Ghosh as Keshab Narayan Chowdhury, lover of Kadalibala
- Suchismita Chowdhury as Sonali, the news reporter who was shown before the casting of the movie
- Md Jakir Hossain as Raj

== Release ==
Bengali film stars were present in the screening of the film in March 2012. The Indian Express gave Bhooter Bhabishyat a four-star rating and described the film as "one of the most intelligent and satiric comedies one has seen in a long time". The film was also released in Mumbai, Bangalore and Delhi in April 2012.

== Remake ==
The film has been remade in Hindi as Gang of Ghosts, directed by Satish Kaushik.

== Legacy ==
Two of the films character has been portrayed in an ad-film of Bisk Farm Top biscuit; where Debdut Ghosh reprises his role as Keshab Narayan Chowdhury, and actor Pushpita Mukherjee replaces Swastika Mukherjee as Kadalibala Dasi.

== See also ==
- Ashchorjyo Prodeep
- Chhayamoy
- Jekhane Bhooter Bhoy
