= Narendra Chandra Dutta =

Indian banker (1878–1962)

- নরেন্দ্রচন্দ্র দত্ত
- Narendra Chandra Dutta
- Born: 25 November 1878; Kalikachchha, Tipperah, Bengal, British India
- Died: 15 April 1962 (aged 83); Calcutta, West Bengal, India
- Occupation: Banker
- Children: Bata Krishna Dutta
- Parent: Mahesh Chandra Dutta

Narendra Chandra Dutta (Bengali: নরেন্দ্রচন্দ্র দত্ত; 25 November 1878 – 15 April 1962) was an Indian banker, founder of Comilla Banking Corporation and later the prime mover behind the incorporation of the United Bank of India.

== Early life ==
Dutta was born to Mahesh Chandra Dutta in Kalikachchha, in the district of Tipperah. His father died when he was only nine months old. His mother struggled to bring him up and then had a live a life of penury. He graduated in law from the Ripon College in Calcutta in 1905. He began his practice in the civil court at Comilla and soon build up a lucrative practice.

== Career ==
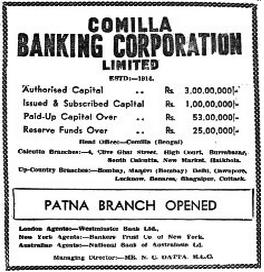
An advertisement of the Comilla Banking Corporation in the Hindusthan Standard on 16 August 1945

In 1914, Dutta founded the Comilla Banking Corporation at the suggestion of community leader Akhil Chandra Dutta with support from Mahesh Chandra Bhattacharya (1848–1944). He started the bank with a declared capital of 4,000 rupees and raised another 2,500 rupees. In order to raise the capital he sold his own house for 1,500 rupees. Initially he drew a monthly remuneration of eight rupees from the bank.

Dutta did an economic survey of eastern India, and began investments in the tea industry. Through the Comilla Banking Corporation he began to issue loans to prospective investors in the tea industry for buying tea plantations and related properties.

After completing his studies, Dutta's eldest son Bata Krishna Dutta returned to Comilla and joined the Comilla Banking Corporation as a trainee. After a few weeks Dutta suggested that Bata Krishna himself could run a bank himself and young Bata Krishna took up the challenge. In 1930, Bata Krishna Dutta took charge of the defunct Comilla Rice and Oil Mills Limited and established the New Standard Bank of India with an initial paid-up capital of thirty thousand rupees.

In 1946, at the suggestion of Chintaman Dwarakanath Deshmukh, the then Governor of the Reserve Bank of India, the New Standard Bank of India merged with the Comilla Banking Corporation, transferring all its assets to the latter. In 1950, Narendra Chandra Dutta along with Jyotish Chandra Das completed the merger of Comilla Banking Corporation and Bengal Central Bank and founded the United Bank of India.
