= 19th Kolkata International Film Festival =

2013 Indian film festival

- Opening film: Taak Jhaank (by Rituparno Ghosh)
- Location: Kolkata, West Bengal, India
- Founded: 1995
- No. of films: 8 days . 63 countries . 152 directors . 189 films.
- Festival date: 10 November 2013– 17 November 2013
- Website: kff.in

The 19th Annual Kolkata Film Festival was held on 10 to 17 November 2013. The Kolkata International Film Festival (KIFF) is an annual film festival held in Kolkata, West Bengal, India. The 19th KIFF was inaugurated by Mr. Amitabh Bachchan on 10 November and was attended by a host of luminaries including Shah Rukh Khan - also the state's brand ambassador as well as actor Kamal Haasan in the presence of Mamata Banerjee who is the current Chief Minister of West Bengal.

== Categories ==
- Inaugural Film
- Centenary Tribute
- Great Master
- Homage
- Retrospective
- New Horizon
- Focus : South East Asia
- 100 Years of Indian cinema
- Special Tribute
- Cinema International
- Shades of black and white
- Special Screening
- Asian Select DreamZ The Movie directed by Sumana Mukherjee
- Indian Select
- Children Screening
- Golden Jubilee
- Student Shorts
