= Mela (2010 film) =

2010 Indian Bengali film

- Directed by: Dhananjay Mandal
- Screenplay by: Dhananjay Mandal
- Cinematography: Sandip Bhattacharya
- Music by: Chandan Roychoudhury
- Release date: 2010
- Country: India
- Language: Bengali

Mela (transl. The Fair) is a 2010 Indian Bengali independent slice-of-life rural drama film directed by Dhananjoy Mandal. The film has been adapted from a story by Taradas Bandopadhyay. The film stars Paran Bandopadhyay, Rudranil Ghosh, Sunil Mukherjee and Mouli Bhattacharya in the lead roles.

Principal photography for Mela took place on location in a remote village during a real Rash Purnima festival, covering the period before, during, and after the event. Chandan Roychoudhury has composed the music for the film. It was released in the theatres in 2010, and was appreciated for its depiction of neo-realism.

== Plot ==
Mela is set around a village fair held during Rash Purnima in a remote village of West Bengal. The fair brings together villagers, stall owners, performers and visitors, creating a temporary centre of social and economic activity.

Bishu Mama arrives at the fair with his nephew Ratan to run a food stall. Nearby, Brojomohan operates another stall with the help of his orphaned niece Alta, while Hriday and Kali sell earthenware. The fair also includes organisers and jatra performers, including Haradhan and Tarini Khuro. Various incidents involving the stall owners, visitors and performers unfold as the fair continues.

Ratan and Alta gradually develop a relationship while taking part in the activities around the fair. Their time together includes visits to an old temple, a deserted mansion and a pond near the fairground. Meanwhile, other events take place among the people gathered there, including disputes between stall owners, a child becoming separated from her family and the activities of a mentally disturbed woman who moves through the fair.

As the festival progresses, friendships develop and tensions arise among the people staying there. The jatra performances and songs become part of the atmosphere of the fair. After the celebrations end, the temporary stalls are dismantled and the visitors and stall owners leave, bringing the gathering to an end.

== Cast ==
- Paran Bandopadhyay as Bishu Mama, a brinjal fritters and potato croquettes seller
- Rudranil Ghosh as Ratan, Bishu Mama's nephew
- Sunil Mukherjee as Brojomohan, a moong dal jalebi seller
- Mouli Bhattacharya as Alta, Brojomohan's orphaned niece

== Reception ==
Shoma A. Chatterji of The Indian Express reviewed the film and described Mela as a simple story depicting the culture of a rural Bengali village fair. She applauded its use of sound, colour, music, landscape and lifelike characters, besides appreciating the strong traces of neo-realism in the film.

A critic from News18 reviewed the film and opined "In an environment where lavish mounting, high-end glamour, jazzy sound, loud music and glorious colour is the rule, Dhananjoy Mandal's Mela brings in a breath of fresh air. It carries echoes of its love for the village landscape of West Bengal." The critic praised the character-driven narrative, the natural performance of all the actors, the director's choice to not use makeup for any of the characters, the background score, cinematography and the sound production but bemoaned the poorly worked upon colour processing of the film in certain stretches.
