= Chandril Bhattacharya =

- Born: Kolkata
- Occupations: Essayist, Lyricist, Poet, Filmmaker, Orator
- Member of: Chandrabindoo (band)

Chandril Bhattacharya (Bengali: চন্দ্রিল ভট্টাচার্য) is a popular Bengali essayist, lyricist, poet, filmmaker and orator from Kolkata.

== Music ==
Bhattacharya is one of the main lyricists of the Bengali band Chandrabindoo and occasionally sings for them. His idiomatic lyrics are known for satire and critiques of modern society. Chandril, together with Anindya Chatterjee, won the 2010 National Film Award for Best Lyrics for the song "Pherari Mon" in the film Antaheen (2009).

== Education ==
He completed his schooling at Ramakrishna Mission Vidyalaya, Narendrapur. He credited his alma mater for fostering his appreciation of local culture. He earned an undergraduate degree in economics as a student at Bidhannagar College and subsequently pursued an MSc degree in economics from the University of Calcutta. He studied at Satyajit Ray Film and Television Institute (1st Batch) from 1996 to 2000 and earned a diploma in film direction and screenwriting. He married Sanchari Mukherjee in 2006.

== Writing ==
Bhattacharya formerly wrote the monthly column "Uttam Madhyam" for Anandabazar Patrika, contributing to occasional op-eds and cover stories for "Sunday Supplement" in the same newspaper. His "Uttam Madhyam" pieces were collected as a book. Later, he began to air his views in the weekly Robbar Pratidin, in a column entitled "Du Chhokka Pnaach" ("two sixes and a five" – the highest score you can get in a single turn in the popular board game Ludo). In January 2011, his "Du Chhokka Pnaach" became bi-weekly. His satirical viewpoints addressed cultural phenomena, national and international current affairs, human psychology and social norms. He coined idioms, playful jargon, spoonerisms and reconstructed colloquial Bengali phrases and expressions to create absurdist, humorous puns in most of his articles.

== Published books ==
1. Dhur Dhur A Porobaase Ke Thakbe (ধুর ধুর এ পরবাসে কে থাকবে): Collection of poems [Pratibhaas Publications] (2008)
2. Uttam Maadhyom (উত্তম মাধ্যম): Collection of bi-weekly Sunday columns of the same name, published in Anandabazar Patrika [Pratibhaas Publications] (2009)
3. Ras Kosh Singara Bulbuli Mastak (রস কষ সিঙাড়া বুলবুলি মস্তক): Collection of articles from Anandabazar Patrika [Dey's Publishing] (2011)
4. Ha Ha Hi Hi Ho Ho O Onyanyo (হাহা হিহি হোহো ও অন্যান্য): Collection of seven articles published in Robbar, Pratidin [Dey's Publishing] (2011)
5. Ugo Bugo Chouko Chugo (উগো বুগো চৌকো চুগো): Collection of poems [Dey's Publishing] (2012)
6. Du Chhokka Pnaach (দু ছক্কা পাঁচ): Collection of selected writings from the column 'Du Chhokka Pnaach' published in Robbar, Pratidin [Dey's Publishing] (2015)
7. Sondher Songe Casual Guley (সন্ধের সঙ্গে ক্যাজুয়াল গুলে): Collection of poems [Dey's Publishing] (2015)
8. Soruchaakli (সরুচাকলি): Collection of poems [Guruchandali] (2017)
9. Rowabnaama (রোয়াবনামা): Collection of selected writings from a 'Person of the week' type satirical column in Anandabazar Patrika [Saptarshi Prakashan] (2018)
10. Ghawno Chokkor (ঘন চক্কর): Collection of selected essays from Anandabazar Patrika [Dey's Publishing] (2018)
11. Chattikhani (চাট্টিখানি): Collection of 4-line poems (clerihews) about renowned people [Dey's Publishing] (2021)
12. Something Something (সামথিং সামথিং): Collection of selected essays from the column 'Something Something' published in Cultural Portal Daakbangla.com [Daakbangla & Dey's Publishing] (2022)
13. Kaak Khaa Bawk Khaa Electiri Shock Khaa (কাক খা বক খা ইলেকটিরি শক খা): Collection of poems [Dey's Publishing] (2024)
14. Chandril Bhattacharjer Koyekta Boktrita (চন্দ্রিল ভট্টাচার্যের কয়েকটা বক্তৃতা): Collection of 8 long speeches [Dey's Publishing] (2025)

== Film ==
Chandril has written and directed these short films:

1. Y2K (Athoba, 'Sex Krome Aasitechhe') (Y2K (অথবা 'সেক্স ক্রমে আসিতেছে')) (30 mins.) (2000) [Diploma Film, Satyajit Ray Film and Television Institute] (Youtube)

2. Talent (ট্যালেন্ট) (19 mins.) (2017) [New Animal Films] (Youtube)

3. Praay Kafka (প্রায় কাফকা) (30 mins.) (2020) (a part of anthology 'Paanch Phoron 2') [SVF] (Hoichoi)

4. Aatpourey (আটপৌরে) (15 mins.) (2024) [Nandanik Studios] (Youtube)

5. Brotokotha (ব্রতকথা) (14 mins.) (2025) [Nandanik Studios] (Youtube)
