= Abohomaan =

2010 Indian film by Rituparno Ghosh

- Theatrical release poster
- Directed by: Rituparno Ghosh
- Written by: Rituparno Ghosh
- Produced by: Mahesh Ramanathan; Big Pictures; Jay Dev Banerjee
- Starring: Dipankar De; Jisshu Sengupta; Mamata Shankar; Riya Sen; Ananya Chatterjee
- Cinematography: Avik Mukhopadhyay
- Edited by: Arghyakamal Mitra
- Music by: 21 Grams
- Distributed by: Reliance BIG Pictures
- Release date: 22 January 2010
- Running time: 122 minutes
- Country: India
- Language: Bengali

Abohomaan (English: The Eternal) is a 2010 Bengali-language romantic drama film by Rituparno Ghosh, which explores the nuances of relationships through a married film director who falls in love with an actress who is the same age as his son. The film stars Deepankar De, Mamata Shankar, Ananya Chatterjee, Jisshu Sengupta, Riya Sen and is produced by Mahesh Ramanathan, Reliance Big Pictures. Rituparno Ghosh, Arghyakamal Mitra, Mahesh Ramanathan and Ananya Chatterjee won National Film Awards in 2010 for Best Director, Best Editor, Best Bengali Film and Best Actress respectively. The film was screened in the Marché du Film section of the 2009 Cannes Film Festival.

Earlier, Rituparno Ghosh had planned to make the film in Hindi as Kya Haseen Sitam, with Naseeruddin Shah, Shabana Azmi and Vidya Balan, later decided to make it in Bengali, as Abahoman.

== Plot ==
Aniket (Deepankar De) is one of the finest filmmakers of Bengal, Deepti (Mamata Shankar) is an actress, with whom he had fallen in love while casting in one of his films, who had sacrificed her career for love and marriage. Apratim (Jisshu Sengupta) is their only son. They had been a perfect family.

The plot thickens when Aniket auditions a young actress, Shikha (Ananya Chatterjee), who bears an uncanny resemblance to his wife when she was younger. Deepti enthusiastically begins to coach Shikha for her husband's film — so much so that Shikha becomes even more like the young woman Deepti once was and, as a result, the aging Aniket falls in love with Shikha, a woman as young as his son, despite the sadness and trouble it brings to his family. However, although portrayed as an apparent love between Aniket and Shikha, Shikha was a Muse for Aniket. Her acting skills and her spontaneity mesmerized him. To him, she was Sreemoti, the name which he had first given to Deepti. Deepti later gave this name to Shikha. Even when Sikha became popular in the acting world by the name Sreemoti, Aniket always referred to her as Sikha. For him, Deepti - his wife was the real Sreemoti. This is revealed towards the end of the movie, when a dying Aniket desires to see Sreemoti, because he has to take a shot, and Deepti comes in front of him. This leaves a lot to be explained but the storyline suggests that Aniket was in love with Sreemoti, more than Deepti or Shikha.

The storyline connects the relationship between Aniket and Shikha to that between the noted theater director (Girish Chandra Ghosh) and the noted actress (Binodini Dasi). Later on when Apratim lies to his wife the same way as his father lied to his wife while spending time with Shikha, it is suggested that this relationship is "Abohomaan" meaning carried over.

== Cast ==
- Deepankar De as Aniket
- Mamata Shankar as Deepti
- Jisshu Sengupta as Apratim
- Ananya Chatterjee as Shikha Sarkar/ Shrimati Sarkar
- Riya Sen as Chandrika/ Tiya
- Saswati Guhathakurta as Hashi
- Sumanta Mukherjee as Girish Chandra Ghosh
- Laboni Sarkar as Shikha's sister
- Shobha Sen as Aniket's mother
- Debjani Chattopadhyay as Sangeeta
- Rishi Kaushik

== Awards ==
The film has won the following awards since its release:

National Film Awards (India)

- Won - Golden Lotus Award - Best Director - Rituparno Ghosh
- Won - Silver Lotus Award - Best Actress - Ananya Chatterjee
- Won - Silver Lotus Award - Best Editing - Arghyakamal Mitra
- Won - Silver Lotus Award - National Film Award for Best Feature Film in Bengali - Mahesh Ramanathan
