= Bengal Central Bank =

Indian commercial bank

Bengal Central Bank was a commercial bank based in Bengal. It was founded by J. C. Das in 1918 as the Bengal Central Loan Company. On 18 December 1950, it merged with Comilla Banking Corporation, Comilla Union Bank and Hooghly Bank to form the United Bank of India.
