= Ekti Tarar Khonje =

2010 Indian Bengali film

- Directed by: Avik Mukhopadhyay
- Written by: Madhuja Mukherjee
- Starring: Shayan Munshi, Arpita Pal, Rudranil Ghosh, Dhritiman Chatterjee
- Edited by: Arghyakamal Mitra
- Release date: 25 June 2010
- Country: India
- Language: Bangla

Ekti Tarar Khonje is a 2010 Bengali-language film that was directed by Avik Mukhopadhyay. The film stars Shayan Munshi, Arpita Pal, Rudranil Ghosh, and veteran actor Dhritiman Chatterjee. Dev appeared in a cameo role.

== Plot ==
It deals with a small-town boy, who comes to Calcutta to be a film actor, and gets involved in a modern-day thugee cult.

== Cast ==
- Shayan Munshi
- Arpita Pal
- Rudranil Ghosh
- Dhritiman Chatterjee
