= Aniruddha Roy Chowdhury =

Bengali and Hindi film director

Anirudhha Roy Chowdhury
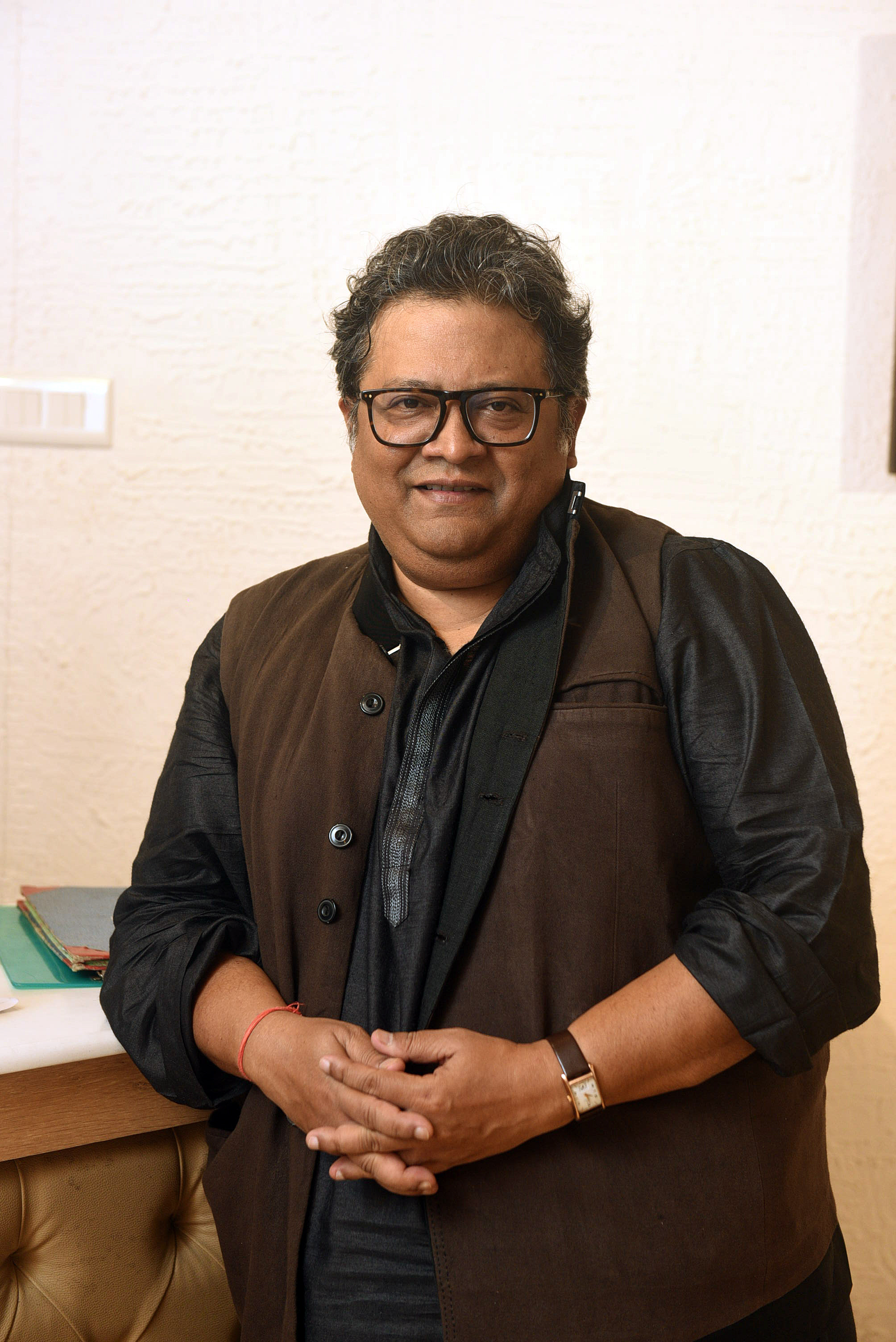
- Born: 31 July 1964 (age 62); Kolkata, West Bengal, India
- Occupation: Film director
- Writing career
- Notable works: Pink, Antaheen, Anuranan

Aniruddha Roy Chowdhury is an Indian film director. He is the director and producer of multiple Bengali and Hindi films. He directed the highly successful Hindi movie Pink which received accolades from film critics and movie lovers alike.

== Career ==
Aniruddha started his film career in the 2006 Bengali film Anuranan. He has won three national awards, Aravindan Puraskaram, one International Indian Film Academy Awards, two Zee Cine Awards, two ETC Bollywood Business Awards, one Stardust Awards, and best director at Jagran Film Festival, to name a few. Alongside feature films, he has directed and produced over four hundred ad films.

Aniruddha received National Film Awards for both Pink and Anuranan. He received a National Film Award in the Best Film category for his 2008 movie Antaheen. The actor also made a cameo appearance in the 2015 Hindi film Piku. He went on to win multiple awards, and he has made movies on important societal themes, enthralling fans and encouraging them to think about issues.

== Filmography ==
=== Films ===
Year	Title	Role	Languages	Notes
2006	Anuranan	Director	Bengali	
2008	Antaheen	Director	Bengali	
2010	Ekti Tarar Khonje	Producer	Bengali	
2012	Aparajita Tumi	Director	Bengali	
2014	Buno Haansh	Director	Bengali	
2016	Pink	Director	Hindi	
2023	Lost	Director	Hindi	ZEE5 Original
2023	Kadak Singh	Director	Hindi	ZEE5 Original
2025	Dear Maa	Director	Bengali	

=== Web series ===
Year	Title	Language	Network	Notes
2019	Parchhayee: Ghost Stories by Ruskin Bond	Hindi	ZEE5 Originals	
2020	Forbidden Love	Hindi	ZEE5 Originals	
