= United Bank of India =

Nationalized bank in India (now defunct)

- Type: Public
- Traded as: NSE: UNITEDBNK; BSE: 533171
- Industry: Banking; Financial services
- Predecessors: Comilla Banking Corporation; Bengal Central Bank; Comilla Union Bank; Hooghly Bank
- Founded: 1950; 76 years ago
- Founder: Narendra Chandra Dutta; J.C Das; Indu Bhushan Dutta; D.N Mukherjee
- Defunct: 1 April 2020; 6 years ago
- Fate: Merged with Punjab National Bank
- Successor: Punjab National Bank
- Headquarters: Kolkata, West Bengal, India
- Area served: India
- Key people: Ashok Kumar Pradhan (MD & CEO)
- Products: Finance and insurance Consumer banking Corporate banking Investment banking Investment management Private equity Mortgages
- Revenue: ▲₹10,945.00 crore (US$1.2 billion) (2019)
- Operating income: ▲₹1,412.00 crore (US$150 million) (2019)
- Net income: ▼₹−2,316.00 crore (US$−250 million) (2019)
- Total assets: ▲₹151,530.00 crore (US$16 billion) (2019)
- Number of employees: 13,804 (2019)
- Capital ratio: 13.00% (2019)

United Bank of India (UBI) was an Indian nationalized bank which provided financial and banking services. Established in 1950 and headquartered in Kolkata, the bank was nationalised by the government of India in 1969 becoming one of public sector banks in the country. The bank has been amalgamated with Punjab National Bank, along with Oriental Bank of Commerce, with effective from 1 April 2020.

== History ==
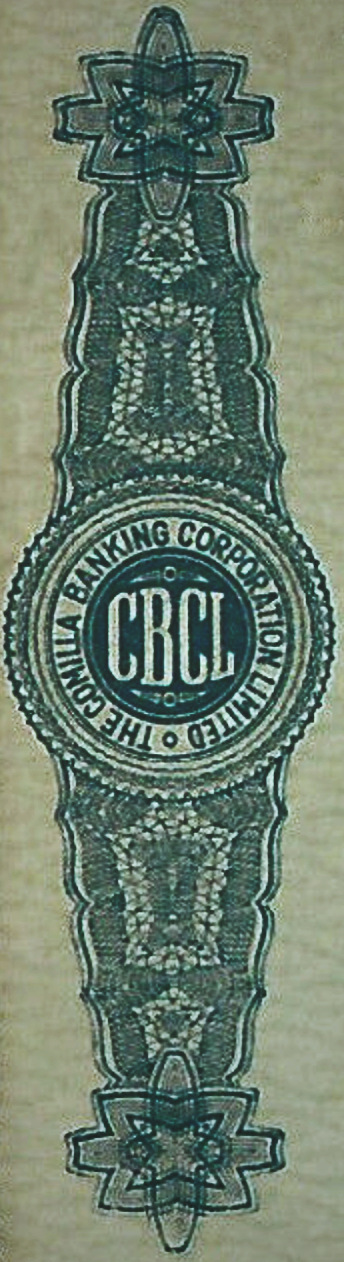
Logo of the defunct Comilla Banking Corporation Limited

UBI was the result of the merger in 1950 of four Bengal-based banks: Comilla Banking Corporation (founded by Narendra Chandra Dutta in 1914 in what is now Bangladesh), Bengal Central Bank (founded by J. C. Das in 1918), Comilla Union Bank (founded by Indu Bhusan Dutta in 1922) and Hooghly Bank (founded by D. N. Mukherjeee in 1932). All four had suffered runs in December 1938 after the failure of the Nath Bank. The Reserve Bank of India assisted the banks in amalgamating to form United Bank of India.

In 1961, UBI merged with Cuttack Bank (est. 6 June 1913) and Tezpur Industrial Bank (est. 6 June 1918, as the first commercial bank in Assam province). Four years later, in 1965, the government of Pakistan took over the bank's branches in Pakistan.

On 19 July 1969, the government of India nationalised UBI, along with 13 other major Indian commercial banks. At the time of nationalisation UBI had only 174 branches. In 1973, UBI acquired Hindustan Mercantile Bank (est. 1944). In 1976, UBI acquired Narang Bank of India, which had been established in 1943 in Narang, Gujarat.

=== Amalgamation ===
On 30 August 2019, Finance Minister Nirmala Sitharaman announced that United Bank and Oriental Bank of Commerce would be merged with Punjab National Bank. The proposed merger would make Punjab National Bank the second largest public sector bank in the country with assets of ₹17.95 lakh crore (US$190 billion) and 11,437 branches. MD and CEO of UBI, Ashok Kumar Pradhan, stated that the merged entity would begin functioning from 1 April 2020. The Union Cabinet approved the merger on 4 March 2020. Punjab National Bank announced that its board had approved the merger ratios the next day. Shareholders of Oriental Bank of Commerce and United Bank will receive 1,150 shares and 121 shares of Punjab National Bank, respectively, for every 1,000 shares they hold. The merger came into effect since 1 April 2020. Post merger, Punjab National Bank has become the second largest public sector bank in India

On 30 March 2009, the Indian government approved the restructuring of United Bank of India. The government proposed to invest 2.5 billion rupees in shares by 31 March and another 5.50 billion in the next fiscal year in Tier-I capital instruments. The move is part of the Indian government's program to improve the capital base of the state-owned banks. UBI gets SEBI approval for Rs 1,000 crore equity issue via QIP On 22 November 2017, United Bank of India (UBI) said it has received SEBI's approval for issue of equity shares worth Rs 1,000 crore by way of institutional placement.

On 1 April 2020, the bank along with Oriental Bank of Commerce has been merged with Punjab National Bank, making it as the second largest public sector bank in India.

== Controversy over Non-performing Assets (NPAs) ==
In February 2014, an RBI-appointed forensic audit by Deloitte found serious lapses in the Non-performing asset detection system of the bank. It is yet to be established whether this oversight on the part of the bank was deliberate or unintentional.

The bank has reported a loss of ₹1,238 crore during Q3 of the 2013-14 fiscal year, resulting in a downgrade of its tier-II bonds by ICRA, an associate of Moody's Investor Service. United Bank of India's reported NPA of 10.82% is the highest in percentage among listed banks in India.

== Delivery channel based products ==
- ATM with cash recycler at many branches
- Varieties of debit card like platinum and moments card
- Internet banking
- Mobile banking
- Prepaid card
- SMS banking
- United E passbook application
- United wallet for utilities payment
- United credit card
- United UPI Bhim application

== See also ==
- United Bank of India (1866-1874)
