= Paran Banerjee =

Indian Bengali film and television actor

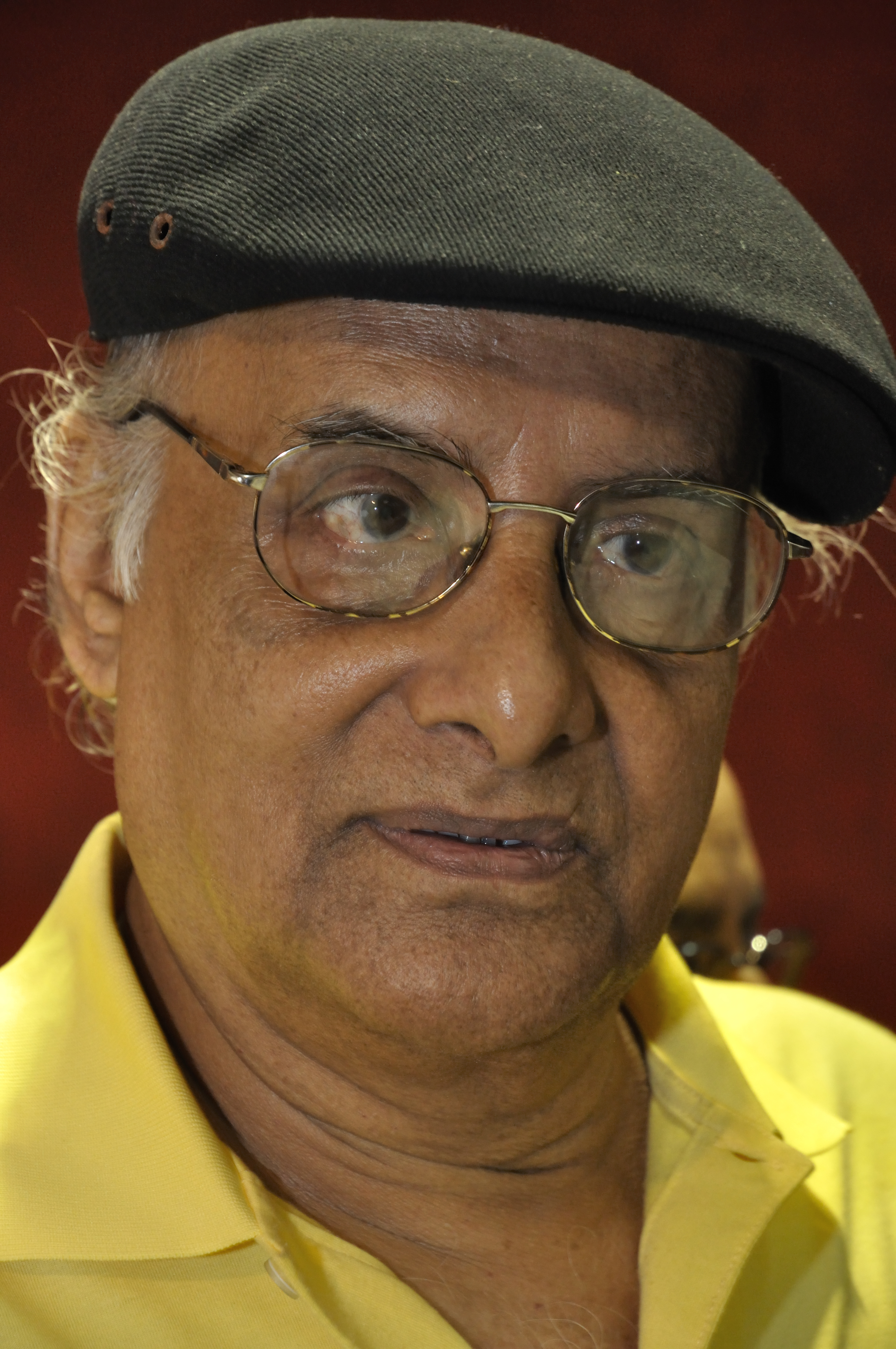
- Banerjee in July 2010
- Born: 18 October 1940 (age 85); Jessore, Bengal presidency, British India (now in Bangladesh)
- Occupations: Actor, Government of West Bengal employee (Retd.)
- Years active: 1985–present

Paran Banerjee (Note: Spelling according to Times of India and Telegraph, Calcutta. We'll follow this spelling.) (also spelled as Paran Bandyopadhyay (Note: Spelling according to Zee Bangla website) (Note: Alternative of surname Bandopadhyay, see Banerjee)) is an Indian Bengali film, television and stage actor based in Kolkata. He has worked with Bengali film director Sandip Ray, the son of filmmaker and author Satyajit Ray.

== Early life ==
Banerjee has roots in Jessore, Bangladesh. His mother died when he was young and his father left home. After that, he was brought up by his paternal aunt in Dum Dum. He did his primary schooling from Deep Chand School in Hindmotor. He graduated from the City College at the University of Calcutta. In his childhood, participated in one-act plays in their neighbourhood.

== Career ==
He has also acted in some plays of the Indian People’s Theatre Association. In 1962, he joined Government of West Bengal in the Department of Public Works Roads.

Bandopadhyay retired from his Government job in 2000. At that time he was 60 years old. He was discovered by Sandip Ray in the late 1990s and his first work was a TV short film named Shadhon Babur Shondeho, based on a story by Satyajit Ray and which was a part of a TV film series named Satyajiter Gappo in 1998. The series was made for DD Bangla.

Between 2000 and 2010, Bandopadhyay acted in more than 35 films. Some of his films are Bombaiyer Bombete (2003), Chiradin Chirakal (2016) Tintorettor Jishu (2008), Gosainbaganer Bhoot (2011), Royal Bengal Rahashya (2011), Jekhane Bhooter Bhoy (2012), Badshahi Angti (2014), Cinemawala (2016) and Double Feluda (2016).

== Major productions of Shrutee Rangam ==
- Tumi Kar
- Bishmul
- Satya Fire Eso
- Mithyebadi
- Jedin Sedin
- Tobe Kamon Hoto
- Promila Piyaji

== Filmography ==
=== Films ===
- Dekha (2001)
- Mondo Meyer Upakhyan (2002)
- Arjun Aamar Naam (2003)
- Bombaiyer Bombete (2003) as Pulak Ghoshal
- Bhalobasar Onek Naam (2006)
- Hochheta Ki (2008)
- Tintorettor Jishu (2008) as Purnendu Pal
- Shono Mon Boli Tomay (2010)
- Mela (2010)
- The Japanese Wife (2010)
- Gosainbaganer Bhoot (2011)
- Royal Bengal Rahashya (2011) as Debotosh Singha Ray
- Bindas Prem (2011)
- Nobel Chor (2012)
- Bhooter Bhabishyat (2012)
- Jekhane Bhooter Bhoy (2012) as Tarini Khuro
- Kidnapper (2013)
- Proloy (2013) Binod Dutta
- Goynar Baksho (2013)
- Chhayamoy (2013)
- Obhishopto Nighty (2014)
- Chaar (2014) as Bateshwar Sikdar
- Badshahi Angti (2014) as Banabihari Sarkar
- Open Tee Bioscope (2015)
- Arshinagar (2015)
- Peace Haven (2016)
- Monchora (2016)
- It's Basanta (2016)
- Cinemawala (2016)
- Double Feluda (2016) as Sidhu Jetha
- Chiradin Chirakal (2016)
- Posto (2017)
- Curzoner Kalom 2017)
- Bolo Dugga Maiki (2017)
- Cockpit (2017)
- Dhananjay (2017)
- Sundari (2018)
- Aranyadeb (2018)
- Bhobishyoter Bhoot (2019)
- Jotilpurer Goppo (upcoming)
- Alinagarer Golokdhanda (2019)
- Ahaa Re (2019)
- Bhootchakra Pvt. Ltd. (2019)
- Purba Paschim Dakshin (2019)
- Paran Bandhu Re (2019)
- Weekend E Suryadoy (2019)
- Borunbabur Bondhu (2020)
- Cholo Potol Tuli (2020)
- Tonic (2021)
- Bob Biswas (2021)
- Kishmish (2022)
- Aparajito (2022) as CM Biman Roy
- Bhubanbabur Smart Phone (2022) as Kripasindhu Sarkhel
- Hatyapuri (2022) as Durgagoti Sen aka D.G Sen
- Dilkhush (2023)
- Mayar Jonjal (2023)
- Pradhan (2023)
- Angshuman MBA (2023)
- Shri Swapankumarer Badami Hyenar Kobole (2024)
- Tekka (2024)
- Pataligunjer Putul Khela (2025)
- Madam Sengupta (2025)
- Kirtoner Por Kirton (2026)

=== Television ===
- Janmabhoomi (as Dibakar) on DD Bangla
- Shadhon Babur Shondeho (Satyajiter Gappo) (1998) on DD Bangla
- RAJMAHAL ON DD Bangla
- MAHAPRABHU AS SULTAN ON DD Bangla
- Bateshworer Abodan-Satyajiter Priyo Galpo (2000) on ETV Bangla
- Neel Seemana (2004)
- Songsar Sukher Hoy Romonir Gune ( 2012–2014) on Star Jalsha
- Proloy Asche (2011) on Sananda TV
- Nayika (2011–12) on Sananda TV
- Boyei Gelo (2013–14) as Bhobhotash Basak on Zee Bangla
- Byomkesh (2014–15) as Anukul Babu on Colors Bangla
- Mirakkel as a judge up to Season 9 on Zee Bangla

=== Web series ===
- Holy Faak
- Holy Faak Season 2
- Shob Choritro (2022)
- Rudrabinar Abhisaap Season 2 (2022)
- Paanchphoron's (2022) (kolkata's first sitcom)
- Abar Proloy
- Dadur Kirti
- Nikhoj (2023)

== Awards and nominations ==
- 2017 - Won for Filmfare Critics Award for Best Actor-Male - Bengali for Cinemawala
- 2017 - Won West Bengal Film Journalists' Association Awards for Best Actor in a Leading Role for Cinemawala
- 2020 - Won Films & Frames Digital Film Awards (Bangla) for Best Supporting Actor for Borunbabur Bondhu
- 2021 - Won West Bengal Film Journalists' Association Awards for Best Actor in a Supporting Role for Borunbabur Bondhu
- 2022 - Won West Bengal Film Journalists' Association Awards for Best Actor in a Leading Role for Tonic (film)
- 2022 - Won Filmfare Award Bangla for Best Actor for Tonic
- 2022 - Nominated 67th Filmfare Awards Best Supporting Actor for Bob Biswas
