= Bauddhayan Mukherji =

Indian film director (born 1973)

- Born: 1 June 1973; India
- Other name: Buddy
- Education: South Point School
- Occupation: Filmmaker
- Organization: Little Lamb Films
- Spouse: Monalisa Mukherji (m. 2002)
- Children: 1

Bauddhayan Mukherji, aka 'Buddy' (born 1 June 1973), is a National Award-winning (2019) Indian filmmaker based in Mumbai.

He is the co-founder of "Little Lamb Films" along with his wife Monalisa, which has produced three feature films - Teenkahon, The Violin Player and Manikbabur Megh (The Cloud & The Man), besides one documentary short, Kiske Liye (Who Is This Women's Day For?).

His forthcoming films include Marichjhapi and The Bookkeeper's Wife.

== Personal life ==
Bauddhayan Mukherji, popularly known as Buddy, is an Indian filmmaker known for his advertising films and indie features. He was born and brought up in Kolkata. His father, Banaj Mukherji, was a poet, while his mother Mira Mukherji, was a school teacher.

At 11, he was gifted a copy of the book "Ekei Bole Shooting" (All About Shooting) written by Satyajit Ray. The book changed his life, and Bauddhayan decided to become a filmmaker.

He studied in South Point School and later St. Xavier's College, Kolkata, where he majored in Economics. Later, he studied at the Clarion College of Communication, eastern India's first advertising college. Bauddhayan lives in Mumbai with his wife Monalisa and daughter Aarsha.

== Professional life ==
Bauddhayan Mukherji's work life began with Shyamanand Jalan's Kolkata-based production house Audio Visual Arts, and later he joined Black Magic Motion Pictures, where he joined as the assistant director but rose up the ranks to become a partner of the company. He was part of the team that created Patalghar (The Underground Chamber), the cult Bengali film in 2002.

Today, Bauddhayan runs his own production house called Little Lamb Films, which he founded with his wife Monalisa in 2007 and is considered a path breaker in Indian advertising filmmaking. He has directed more than 400 TVCs and has helped create brands like Procter & Gamble, Nokia, Unilever, Honda, GlaxoSmithKline, Coke, Colgate, Heinz, Johnson & Johnson, and Hyundai Motor Company, to name a few.

In 2010, Bauddhayan directed the Bell Bajao campaign for Breakthrough, which went on to win the prestigious Silver Lion at Cannes – the Oscars of advertising films. He also became the first Indian filmmaker to win two back-to-back One Show merits at New York and Spikes Asia Golds at Singapore. In 2015, the Haathipaon Mukt Bharat (Filaria Free India) campaign for the Sabin Vaccine Institute landed him with another Silver Lion at Cannes Health.

In 2013, Bauddhayan ventured into feature films and over the last few years has directed two of India's most awarded and internationally acclaimed indies under the banner of Little Lamb Films – Teenkahon (2014, Bengali, available on Amazon Prime) & The Violin Player (2016, Hindi, available on Netflix). These films have been screened at more than 85 film festivals across five continents. In 2015, Bauddhayan went on to win the Aravindan Puraskaram, an award by the Kerala State Chalachitra Academy for the Best Debutant Director in the country, for Teenkahon. The Violin Player also became the first Indian film ever to be represented by the French Sales Agents, Alpha Violet.

In 2021, Bauddhayan won his first National Award for The Shower - a PSA on the rural-urban water inequality for Unilever, India. The Shower became the first Indian advertisement film to win the National Award. It won the Best Promotional Film in the non-feature film category at the 67th National Film Awards.

Marichjhapi, his next directorial venture for Little Lamb Films, has already created a buzz in the international co-production market when it was chosen to represent India at the prestigious Asian Project Market at Busan 2019 and Cinéfondation L'Atelier at the Cannes Film Festival 2020. One of Bauddhayan's forthcoming directorial projects, The Bookkeeper's Wife, was part of the Co-production Market at Film Bazaar 2020 and the Torino Film Lab NXT, 2021.

== Festival circuit ==
Release	Film	Producer	Director	Festival	Category	Accolade	Year	Ref
2023	Marichjhapi (feature)	Monalisa Mukherji	check	Cannes Film Festival	Cinefondation's L'Atelier program	Official Selection	2020	
2023	Marichjhapi (feature)	Monalisa Mukherji	check	Busan International Film Festival	Asian Project Market program	Official Selection	2019	
2018	Who Is This Women's Day For? (aka Kiske Liye; documentary)	check	Monalisa Mukherji	Anatolia International Film Festival		Nominated	2020	
2018	Who Is This Women's Day For? (aka Kiske Liye; documentary)	check	Monalisa Mukherji	WorldFest-Houston International Film Festival	Gold Remi	Won	2020	
2018	Who Is This Women's Day For? (aka Kiske Liye; documentary)	check	Monalisa Mukherji	Impact Doc Awards	Award of Excellence	Won	2020	
2018	Who Is This Women's Day For? (aka Kiske Liye; documentary)	check	Monalisa Mukherji	Central Michigan International Film Festival		Official Selection	2020	
2018	Who Is This Women's Day For? (aka Kiske Liye; documentary)	check	Monalisa Mukherji	Aphrodite Film Awards		Finalist	2020	
2018	Who Is This Women's Day For? (aka Kiske Liye; documentary)	check	Monalisa Mukherji	2nd South Asian Short Film Festival		Official Selection	2019	
2018	Who Is This Women's Day For? (aka Kiske Liye; documentary)	check	Monalisa Mukherji	Beirut International Women Film Festival		Official Selection	2019	
2018	Who Is This Women's Day For? (aka Kiske Liye; documentary)	check	Monalisa Mukherji	Audfest Documentary Short Film Festival,		Finalist	2018	
2015	The Violin Player (feature)	Monalisa Mukherji	check	ImagineIndia International Film Festival	Best Actor	Won	2017	
2015	The Violin Player (feature)	Monalisa Mukherji	check	ImagineIndia International Film Festival	Best Cinematography	Won	2017	
2015	The Violin Player (feature)	Monalisa Mukherji	check	DC Independent Film Festival		Official Selection	2017	
2015	The Violin Player (feature)	Monalisa Mukherji	check	RapidLion International Film Festival	Best Original Score	Nominated	2017	
2015	The Violin Player (feature)	Monalisa Mukherji	check	RapidLion International Film Festival	Best Screenplay	Nominated	2017	
2015	The Violin Player (feature)	Monalisa Mukherji	check	RapidLion International Film Festival	Best Cinematography	Nominated	2017	
2015	The Violin Player (feature)	Monalisa Mukherji	check	Durban International Film Festival	Best Film Award	Won	2016	
2015	The Violin Player (feature)	Monalisa Mukherji	check	Raindance Film Festival	Best Film	Nominated	2016	
2015	The Violin Player (feature)	Monalisa Mukherji	check	Raindance Film Festival	Best Screenplay	Nominated	2016	
2015	The Violin Player (feature)	Monalisa Mukherji	check	Raindance Film Festival	Best Actor	Nominated	2016	
2015	The Violin Player (feature)	Monalisa Mukherji	check	Zurich Film Festival		Official Selection	2016	
2015	The Violin Player (feature)	Monalisa Mukherji	check	Cork Film Festival		Official Selection		
2015	The Violin Player (feature)	Monalisa Mukherji	check	São Paulo International Film Festival	New Directors Competition	Nominated	2016	
2015	The Violin Player (feature)	Monalisa Mukherji	check	All Lights India International Film Festival	Critics Choice for Best Film	Won	2016	
2015	The Violin Player (feature)	Monalisa Mukherji	check	Kolkata International Film Festival	NETPAC award	Nominated	2016	
2015	The Violin Player (feature)	Monalisa Mukherji	check	Jio MAMI Film Festival	India Gold	Nominated	2015	
2015	The Violin Player (feature)	Monalisa Mukherji	check	International Film Festival of Kerala	International competition	Nominated	2015	
2014	Teenkahon (feature)	Monalisa Mukherji	check	Festival du Film d'Asie du Sud Transgressif, Paris, France	Student Jury for Best Narrative Feature	Special Mention		
2014	Teenkahon (feature)	Monalisa Mukherji	check	DC Independent Film Festival		Official Selection	2015	
2014	Teenkahon (feature)	Monalisa Mukherji	check	Zimbabwe International Film Festival		Official Selection	2014	
2014	Teenkahon (feature)	Monalisa Mukherji	check	Kerala State Chalachitra Academy	Aravindan Puraskaram	Won		
2014	Teenkahon (feature)	Monalisa Mukherji	check	Mumbai Film Festival	India Story	Official Selection	2014	
2014	Teenkahon (feature)	Monalisa Mukherji	check	International Film Festival of India	Indian Panorama	Official Selection	2014	
2014	Teenkahon (feature)	Monalisa Mukherji	check	Chennai International Film Festival		Nominated		
2014	Teenkahon (feature)	Monalisa Mukherji	check	Pune International Film Festival		Nominated	2015	
2014	Teenkahon (feature)	Monalisa Mukherji	check	RapidLion International Film Festival	Best Editing	Won	2016	
2014	Teenkahon (feature)	Monalisa Mukherji	check	London Asian Film Festival		Official Selection	2016	
2014	Teenkahon (feature)	Monalisa Mukherji	check	Virginia Film Festival		Official Selection	2015	
2014	Teenkahon (feature)	Monalisa Mukherji	check	Indian Film Festival Stuttgart		Official Selection	2015	
2014	Teenkahon (feature)	Monalisa Mukherji	check	Indian Film Festival Melbourne		Official Selection	2015	
2014	Teenkahon (feature)	Monalisa Mukherji	check	Soho International Film Festival	Best World Showcase	Nominated	2015	
2014	Teenkahon (feature)	Monalisa Mukherji	check	North Carolina State's Global Film Festival	Best Actor	Won	2015	
2014	Teenkahon (feature)	Monalisa Mukherji	check	Seattle South Asian Film Festival	Audience Choice Award	Won	2014	
2014	Teenkahon (feature)	Monalisa Mukherji	check	Bridge Film Festival	Best Screenplay Award	Won	2014	
2014	Teenkahon (feature)	Monalisa Mukherji	check	Bridge Film Festival	Jury Special Mention for Cinematography	Won		
