= Chhayamoy =

2013 Indian Bengali-language film

- Film poster
- Directed by: Haranath Chakraborty
- Written by: Monotosh Chakraborty
- Screenplay by: Monotosh Chakraborty
- Story by: Shirshendu Mukhopadhyay
- Based on: Chhayamoy by Shirshendu Mukhopadhyay
- Starring: Gaurav Chakrabarty; Sabyasachi Chakrabarty; Deepankar De
- Cinematography: Souvik Basu
- Edited by: Rabiranjan Moitra
- Music by: Debojyoti Mishra
- Production company: Rosevalley films
- Release date: 22 March 2013 (Kolkata)
- Country: India
- Language: Bengali

Chhayamoy is a 2013 Bengali-language fantasy comedy horror films directed by Haranath Chakraborty and based on Shirshendu Mukhopadhyay's novel of the same title. This was a children's film with supernatural elements in it. Debajyoti Mishra composed the music of the film.

== Plot ==
Indrajit is a UK based scholar. While working to preserve historical documents, he finds a parchment from which he learns about treasures hidden in an old Zamindar palace in Simulgarh, a village of West Bengal. Actually Indrajit is the descendant of the zamindar's family. He comes to the village and finds out the treasure. But a corrupt moneylender Gagan Sapui accuses him of robbery, beats him up, snatches all the treasures and throws him in a nearby forest. From there, Indra is rescued by Alankar, a simple and poor boy from the village. Together they retrieve the treasure from Gagan Sapui with the help of a noble ghost Chhayamoy, who was once the minister of the Zamindar family. Eventually, the fraud and the corrupt nature of Gagan Sapui is revealed to the entire village.

== Cast ==
- Gaurav Chakrabarty as Indrajit
- Sabyasachi Chakrabarty as Chhayamoy/Chandra Kumar
- Deepankar De as Gagan Sapui
- Paran Bandopadhyay as Gour Thakurda
- Shantilal Mukherjee as Kali Kapalik
- Rituparna Sengupta as dancer
- Monu Mukherjee as Potol Ganguly
- Nimu Bhowmik as Natabar Ghosh
- Adhiraj Ganguly as Alankar
- Debesh Roychowdhury as Haripada
- Sudip Mukherjee as Lakkhan
- Chandu Chakraborty as Raja Mahendra Pratap

== See also ==
- Ashchorjyo Prodeep, 2013 Bengali film
- Ajab Gayer Ajab Katha, 1998 Bengali film
