= List of Indian Bengali films of the 1990s =

A list of films produced by the Tollywood (Bengali language film industry) based in Kolkata in the 1990s.

== 1990 ==
Title	Director	Cast	Genre	Notes
Abhimanyu	Biplab Chattopadhyay	Soumitra Chatterjee, Satabdi Roy	Romance	
Abishkar	Salil Dutta	Tapas Paul, Satabdi Roy	Romance	
Agni Kanya	Gopal Gupta	Farooq Shaikh, Roopa Ganguly, Utpal Dutt, Anil Chatterjee	Thriller	
Alingan	Tapan Saha	Soumitra Bannerjee, Shakuntala Barua, Sunetra Bhattacharya		
Andha Bichar	Shakti Samanta	Mithun Chakraborty, Tanuja	Drama	
Apan Amar Apan	Tarun Majumdar	Tapas Paul, Prosenjit Chatterjee, Satabdi Roy	Drama	
Badnam	Shibu Mitra	Prosenjit Chatterjee, Neelam Kothari, Sunny Deol, Shakti Kapoor	Drama	
Balidan	Anil Ganguly	Tapas Paul, Naina Das, Rupali, Papiya Adhikari, Rakhi Gulzar	Drama	
Bhangagara	Guru Bagchi	Prosenjit Chatterjee, Satabdi Roy, Dipankar Dey	Romance, drama	
Byabodhan	Dilip Mukherjee	Moon Moon Sen, Victor Bannerjee, Tapas Paul		
Chakranta	Himanshu Parija	Siddhanta Manmohan, Mahapatra, Meghna Mishra		
Chetana	Deb Sinha	Prosenjit Chatterjee, Satabdi Roy, Devika Mukherjee, Rabi Ghosh	Romance, drama	
Debota	Abhijit Sen	Victor Banerjee, Ranjit Mallick, Debashree Roy	Romance, drama	
Deepa & Rupa: A Fairy Tale from India	Manick Sorcar	Piya Sorcar, Deepa Reddy	Fantasy-children's film	
Ekhane Aamar Swarga	Jahar Biswas	Soumitra Chatterjee, Tapas Paul	Romance, drama	
Ganashatru	Satyajit Ray	Soumitra Chatterjee, Ruma Guha Thakurta	Drama	
Garmil	Dilip Roy	Tapas Paul, Debashree Roy, Roopa Ganguly	Romance, drama	
Gharer Bou	S. S. Roy	Chiranjeet Chakraborty, Satabdi Roy, Sandhya Roy	Drama	
Hirak Jayanti	Anjan Choudhury	Ranjit Mallick, Chumki Choudhury, Joy Banerjee	Romance, drama	
Jwar Bhata	Dulal Bhowmik	Chiranjeet Chakraborty, Satabdi Roy, Sumanta Mukherjee		
Ladai	Rana Mukherjee	Prosenjit Chatterjee, Ritu Das, Soumitra Chatterjee, Utpal Dutt	Drama	
Mandira	Sujit Guha	Prosenjit Chatterjee, Indrani Haldar, Sonam	Drama	
Mon Mayuree	Biresh Chatterjee	Tapas Paul, Moushumi Chatterjee, Dipankar De	Romance, drama	
Path O Prasad	Tarun Majumdar	Utpal Dutt, Soumitra Chatterjee, Sandhya Roy	Drama	
Rajnartaki	Narayan Chakraborty	Tapas Paul, Sudha Chandran, Anup Kumar		
Sankranti	Maloy Mitra	Prosenjit Chatterjee, Mahua Roychoudhury, Aparna Sen, Om Puri	Drama	
Sei To Abar Kache Ele	Jayanta Bhattacharya	Arjun Chakraborty, Prosenjit Chatterjee, Varsha Usgaonkar		
Shakha Proshakha	Satyajit Ray	Soumitra Chatterjee, Ranjit Mallick, Lily Chakravarty	Drama	
Swarna Trishna	Mangal Chakraborty	Mithun Chakraborty, Prem Chopra, Yogeeta Bali	Action	

== 1991 ==
Title	Director	Cast	Genre	Notes
Aamar Sathi	Salil Dutta	Satabdi Roy, Rabi Ghosh	Romance	
Abhagini	Bablu Samaddar	Ranjit Mallick, Soumitra Chatterjee	Romance	
Agantuk	Satyajit Ray	Utpal Dutt, Dipankar De, Mamata Shankar		
Ahankar	Shrikant Guha-Thakurta	Kali Bannerjee, Soumitra Bannerjee, Prosenjit Chatterjee		
Ananda	Kumar Swapan	Kumar Swapan, Talluri Rameshwari, Anupama Chatterjee	Romance	
Ananda Niketan	Sujit Guha	Suparna Anand, Satya Bandopadhyay, Bratati Bandopadhyay		
Antarer Bhalobasa	Bimal Roy, jr.	Tapas Paul, Mandakini, Madhavi Mukherjee		
Beder Meye Josna	Tojammel Haque Bokul	Anju Ghosh, Chiranjit Chakraborty, Shambhu Bhattacharya		
Bidhir Bidhan	Mohammad Mohsin	Ranjit Mallick, Tapas Paul, Satabdi Roy	Romance, drama	
Bourani	Bhabesh Kundu	Anil Chatterjee, Anup Kumar, Manoj Mitra		
Debar	Amal Ray Ghatak	Tapas Paul, Indrani Haldar, Debraj Roy	Drama	
Ek Pashla Bristi	Nitish Ray	Prosenjit Chatterjee, Sreela Majumdar, Soumitra Chatterjee	Romance	
Jeevan Pradip	Pradip Bhattacharya	Kalipada Chakraborty, Abhishek Chatterjee, Subhendu Chatterjee		
Katha Dilam	Rajat Das	Prosenjit Chatterjee, Ayesha Jhulka	Romance, drama	
Lakhi Durga Saraswati	Qamar Narvi	Shekhar Suman, Moon Moon Sen, Sudha Chandran	Thriller	
Maan Maryada	Sukhen Das	Satabdi Roy, Tapas Paul, Samit Bhanja	Drama	
Mahashya	Mukul Dutt	Tapas Paul, Moon Moon Sen, Anup Kumar		
Nawab	Haranath Chakraborty	Bhaskar Bannerjee, Soumitra Bannerjee, Nimu Bhowmick		
Neelimai Neel	Biresh Chatterjee	Tapas Paul, Indrani Haldar, Sreela Majumdar	Romance, drama	
Palataka	Swaran Dey	Prosenjit Chatterjee, Rabi Ghosh, Tarun Kumar	Romance	
Pati Param Guru	Biresh Chatterjee	Tapas Paul, Utpal Dutt, Animesh Ray Chowdhury		
Pennam Kolkata	Guru Bagchi	Chiranjeet Chakraborty, Satabdi Roy, Utpal Dutt	Romance, drama	
Prashna	Sharon Dey	Sanghamitra Banerjee, Anil Chatterjee, Prosenjit Chatterjee		
Prem Joyare	Kajal Chakraborty	Anupama Chatterjee, Utpal Dutt, Rabi Ghosh, Dipankar De	Drama	
Prem Pujari	Nandan Dasgupta	Prosenjit Chatterjee, Satabdi Roy, Dipankar De, Nirmal Kumar	Drama	
Sadharan Meye	Samit Bhanja	Tapas Paul, Debashree Roy, Swarup Dutt, Kali Banerjee	Romance, drama	
Shubha Kamana	Anup Sengupta	Rabi Ghosh, Tapas Paul, Debashree Roy		
Sindoor	Anandam	Satya Bandopadhyay, Swantana Basu, Soma Chaki		

== 1992 ==
Title	Director	Cast	Genre	Notes
Adhikar	Deb Singha	Prosenjit Chatterjee, Satabdi Roy	Romance	
Agantuk	Satyajit Ray	Utpal Dutt, Dipankar De, Rabi Ghosh	Drama	
Ananya	Dulal Dey	Ranjit Mallick, Aparna Sen, Joy Banerjee		
Antardhan	Tapan Sinha	Soumitra Chatterjee, Madabhi Mukherjee, Satabdi Roy	Drama	
Anutap	Prabhat Roy	Debashree Roy, Raj Babbar	Family drama	
Apan Por	Tapan Saha	Prosenjit Chatterjee, Juhi Chawla	Drama	
Bhalobasa O Andakar	Dipranjan Bose	Sourin Bandopadhyay, Satya Bannerjee, Sanchita Bose		
Dharma Yuddha	Samit Bhanja	Roopa Ganguly, Tapas Paul, Satabdi Roy		
Goopy Bagha Phire Elo	Sandip Ray	Tapen Chatterjee, Rabi Ghosh	Fantasy	
Hirer Angti	Rituparno Ghosh	Basanta Choudhury, Gyanesh Mukherjee		
Indrajit	Anjan Choudhury	Ranjit Mallick, Chumki Choudhury, Abhishek Chatterjee		
Jekhaney Aashroy	Amitava Mitra	Mahua Roychoudhury, Joy Banerjee, Soumitra Banerjee	Romance, drama	
Mahaprithibi	Mrinal Sen	Soumitra Chatterjee, Aparna Sen, Victor Bannerjee	Social drama	
Mani Kanchan	Ashim Bannerjee	Satya Bandopadhyay, Shakuntala Barua, Nirmal Kumar Chakraborty		
Maya Mamata	Anjan Choudhury	Ranjit Mallick, Anup Kumar, Dilip Roy		
Mayabini	Tushar Majumdar	Tapas Paul, Debashree Roy, Utpal Dutt	Drama	
Mon Mane Na	Inder Sen	Prosenjit Chatterjee, Silpa Das	Drama	
Monikanchan	Ashim Bannerjee	Satya Bandopadhyay, Shakuntala Barua, Nirmal Kumar Chakraborty		
Nabarupa	Anand Ray Ghatak	Ayan Bannerjee, Laboni Sarkar, Bhaskar Bannerjee		
Natun Sansar	Sanat Dutta	Abhishek Chatterjee, Satabdi Roy, Dipankar De	Drama	
Padma Nadir Majhi	Goutam Ghose	Raisul Islam Asad, Champa, Utpal Dutt	Drama	
Pennam Kolkata	Gurudas Bagchi	Chiranjit Chakraborty, Satabdi Roy, Utpal Dutt		
Pratham Dekha	Sujit Guha	Haradhan Bannerjee, Soumitra Bannerjee, Shakuntala Barua		
Priya	Shibu Mitra	Prosenjit Chatterjee, Pallavi Joshi, Shakti Kapoor, Rabi Ghosh	Romance, drama	
Purushottam	Prosenjit Chatterjee	Prosenjit Chatterjee, Debashree Roy, Abhishek Chatterjee	Drama	
Rakta Lekha	Ram Mukherjee	Samit Bhanja, Arjun Chakraborty, Biplab Chatterjee		
Rupban Kanya	Harumur Rashid	Biswajit Chatterjee, Anushree Das, Anil Chatterjee	Romance, drama	
Shwet Pathorer Thala	Prabhat Roy	Aparna Sen, Dipankar De, Sabyasachi Chakraborty		
Sone Ki Zanjeer	Shivkumar	Laxmikant Berde, Priya Arun Berde, Prosenjit Chatterjee		
Surer Bhubaney	Prabir Mitra	Prosenjit Chatterjee, Tapas Paul, Roopa Ganguly	Romance, drama	
Tahader Katha	Buddhadeb Dasgupta	Mithun Chakraborty, Anashua Majumder	Drama	

== 1993 ==
Title	Director	Cast	Genre	Notes
Aatmajo	Nabyendu Chattopadhyay	Arjun Chakraborty, Sanghamitra Bandyopadhyay	Romance	
Amar Kahini	Indranil Goswami	Tapas Paul, Anil Chatterjee	Romance	
Antareen	Mrinal Sen	Anjan Dutt, Dimple Kapadia	Drama	
Anubhav	Deboki Kumar Bose	Shankar Chakraborty, Rozina Chatterjee, Tarun Kumar Chatterjee		
Charachar	Buddhadeb Dasgupta	Shankar Chakraborty, Indrani Haldar, Rajit Kapoor	Drama	Entered into the 44th Berlin International Film Festival
Dan Protidan	Sukhen Das	Tapas Paul, Mahashweta Roy, Indrani Haldar		
Duranta Prem	Prabhat Roy	Rachana Banerjee, Baradhan Bannerjee, Shakuntala Barua		
Kanyadan	Amal Dutta	Chiranjit Chakraborty, Satabdi Roy, Ashok Kumar		
Iswar Parameswar	Bablu Samaddar	Ranjit Mallick, Madhavi, Anil Chatterjee	Action	
Janani	Sanat Dasgupta	Roopa Ganguly	Parallel	Won Prize of the Ecumenical Jury at Karlovy Vary International Film Festival
Laho Pronam	Milan Bhowmik	Rana Mukherjee, Tapan Mukherjee, Rumki Bhowmik		
Man Samman	Swapan Saha	Chiranjeet Chakraborty, Satabdi Roy, Ranjit Mallick	Drama	
Marg	Maniklal Banerjee	Joy Sengupta, Prabhas Basu, Ranjit Seth		
Mayer Ashirvad	Parimal Ghosh	Dipankar De, Sumitra Mukherjee, Soma Dey	Drama	
Misti Madhur	Shantimoy Bannerjee	Anubhav Rana, Somasree Ghosh, Anup Kumar		
Nati Binodini	Dinen Gupta	Prosenjit Chatterjee, Debashree Roy, Dilip Roy	Drama	
Pashanda Pandit	Shibaprasad Sen	Soumitra Chatterjee, Anusuya Majumdar, Manoj Mitra	Drama	
Prajapati	Biplab Chatterjee	Biplab Chatterjee, Soumitra Chatterjee, Dipankar De	Social drama	
Prathama	Prabir Mitra	Tapas Paul, Satabdi Roy, Biplab Chatterjee	Romance, drama	
Prem Puja	Durga Bhattacharya	Kunal Dutta, Madhuri Chatterjee, Ratna Ghoshal	Drama	
Premi	Bikash Bannerjee	Beena Banerjee, Shakuntala Barua, Arun Chakraborty		
Prithibir Sesh Station		Prosenjit Chatterjee, Madhabi Mukherjee, Anup Kumar	Drama	
Rajar Meye Parul	Milan Choudhury	Tapas Paul, Anju Ghosh, Papiya Adhikari	Romance, drama	
Rakter Swad	Dhruba Dutta	Prosenjit Chatterjee, Debashree Roy, Dilip Roy	Drama	
Samay Ahsamay Dussamay	Arabinda Ghosh	Kunal Dutta, Sagarika, Manna Dey		
Shanka	Salilmoy Ghosh	Chiranjeet Chakraborty, Rabi Ghosh	Action	
Srodhanjali	Srikant Guha Thakurta	Prosenjit Chatterjee, Ranjit Mallick, Debashree Roy	Romance, drama	
Sukher Swarga	Biresh Chatterjee	Prosenjit Chatterjee, Satabdi Roy, Uttam Mohanty	Drama	
Sunya Theke Suru	Ashoke Viswanathan	Dhritiman Chatterjee, Mamata Shankar, N. Viswanathan		
Tomar Rakte Aamar Sohag	Ram Mukherjee	Chiranjit, Debashree Roy, Dipankar De		

== 1994 ==
Title	Director	Cast	Genre	Notes
Aami O Maa	Sukhen Chakraborty	Arindam Ganguly, Sumitra Mukherjee, Anup Kumar	Drama	
Abbajan	Anjan Choudhury	Ranjit Mallick, Abhishek Chatterjee	Romance	
Ajana Path	Srinibas Chakraborty	Prosenjit Chatterjee, Satabdi Roy	Romance	
Ajana Sapath	Salil Sen	Soumitra Chatterjee, Madhabi Mukherjee, Pahari Sanyal		
Atikram	Amal Dutta	Chiranjeet Chakraborty, Papiya Adhikari, Devika Mukherjee	Drama	
Bhalobasar Ashroy	Sanjib Dey	Bhaskar Banerjee, Laboni Sarkar, Aditi Chatterjee	Romance, drama	
The Broken Journey	Sandip Ray	Lily Chakravarty, Soumitra Chatterjee	Drama	Screened at the 1994 Cannes Film Festival
Biswas Abiswas		Prosenjit Chatterjee		
Bonophool	Samit Bhanja	Master Abhishek, Shakuntala Barua, Samit Bhanja		
Dagi	Rama Prasad Chakraborty	Shoma Anand, Sumitra Mukherjee, Dipankar Dey		
Danga	Swapan Saha	Chiranjeet Chakraborty, Suchitra, Bhaskar Banerjee	Action	
Dhusar Godhuli	Bimal Roy	Prosenjit Chatterjee, Koyel Banerjee, Arjun Chakraborty	Romance, drama	
Gajamukta	Ajit Lahiri	Moon Moon Sen, Abhishek Chatterjee, Soumitra Chatterjee	Romance, drama	
Geet Sangeet	Subhash Sen	Ranjit Mallick, Subhendu Chatterjee, Sabitri Chatterjee		
Kaal Purush	Pratap Jaiswal	Prosenjit Chatterjee, Satabdi Roy, Satya Banerjee	Drama	
Lal Pan Bibi	Prashanta Nanda	Chiranjeet Chakraborty, Satabdi Roy, Rituparna Sengupta	Action	
Mahabharathi	Amar Bhattacharya	Dipankar De, Rajeswari Roychowdhury, Anil Chatterjee	Drama	
Naga Jyoti	Ramanarayan	Anushree Das, Jamuna, Uttam Mohanty		
Phiriye Dao	Chiranjeet Chakraborty	Chiranjeet Chakraborty, Rakhee Gulzar, Satabdi Roy	Drama	
Prasab	Utpalendu Chakraborty	Arjun Chakraborty, Sreela Majumdar, Goutam Chakraborty	Drama	
Pratyaghat	Santanu Bhowmick	Prosenjit Chatterjee, Indrani Dutta, Shakti Kapoor		
Prem Sanghat	Santanu Bhowmick			
Raja Harisch Chandra	Uma Prasad Maitra	Ashok Chakraborty, Sujata Devi, Shyamalendu Bhattacharya	Devotional	
Rajar Raja	Shamit Bhanja	Prosenjit Chatterjee, Debashree Roy, Abhishek Chatterjee	Romance	
Rakta Nadir Dhara	Ram Mukherjee	Chiranjeet Chakraborty, Prosenjit Chatterjee, Debashree Roy	Action	
Sarbojaya	Sukanta Roy	Tapas Paul, Abhishek Chatterjee, Satabdi Roy	Action	
Shilpi	Nabyendu Chatterjee	Anjan Dutt, Meghnad Bhattacharya		
Tumi Je Aamar	Inder Sen	Ranjit Mallick, Prosenjit Chatterjee, Tapas Paul	Drama	
Unishe April	Rituparno Ghosh	Aparna Sen, Debashree Roy, Prosenjit Chatterjee	Drama	

== 1995 ==
Title	Director	Cast	Genre	Notes
Abirbhab	Piyush Debnath	Chiranjeet Chakraborty, Satabdi Roy, Ranjit Mallick	Romance, drama	
Amodini	Chidananda Dasgupta	Rachana Banerjee, Pijush Ganguly	Romance	
Antar Bahir	Sushil Mukherjee	Satabdi Roy, Chinmoy Roy, Utpal Dutt	Romance, comedy	
Antaratama	Dinabandhu Ghosh	Soumitra Bannerjee, Shakuntala Barua, Somasree Ghosh		
Bhagya Debata	Raghuram	Mithun Chakraborty, Soham Chakraborty, Soumitra Chatterjee	Action	
Buk Bhara Bhalobasha			Romance	
Dristee	Taba Mallick	Prosenjit Chatterjee, Amjad Khan, Papiya Adhikari	Romance, drama	
Jeevan Yodha	Mripen Saha	Chiranjeet Chakraborty, Indrani Haldar, Pallavi Chatterjee		
Kakababu Here Gelen?	Pinaki Chaudhuri	Soumitra Chatterjee, Sabyasachi Chakraborty	Drama	
Kencho Khunrte Keute	Chiranjeet Chakraborty	Chiranjeet Chakraborty, Indrani Dutta, Utpal Dutt	Romance, drama	
Kumari Maa	Dulal Bhowmik	Chiranjeet Chakraborty, Anju Ghosh, Satabdi Roy	Drama	
Mejo Bou	Bablu Samaddar	Ranjit Mallick, Kali Bannerjee, Anup Kumar		
Protidhwani	Anup Sengupta	Tapas Paul, Satabdi Roy, Moon Moon Sen	Action	
Rakhal Raja	Sanat Dutta	Chiranjeet Chakraborty, Rituparna Sengupta, Sumitra Mukherjee	Romance, drama	
Rangin Basanta	Sandip Chatterjee	Indrani Haldar, Abhishek Chatterjee, Devika Mukherjee		
Sangharsha	Haranath Chakraborty	Ranjit Mallick, Tapas Paul, Prosenjit Chatterjee	Drama	
Sansar Sangram	Chiranjit	Chiranjit Chakraborty, Satabdi Roy, Rituparna Sengupta		
Sesh Pratiksha	Sachin Adhikari	Prosenjit Chatterjee, Satabdi Roy, Abhishek Chatterjee	Romance, drama	
Sujan Sakhi	Swapan Saha	Abhishek Chatterjee, Rituparna Sengupta, Teli Samad	Romance, drama	
Sukher Asha		Indrani Dutta, Satabdi Roy, Farooq Shaikh		
Yugant	Aparna Sen	Anjan Dutt, Roopa Ganguly	Drama	

== 1996 ==
Title	Director	Cast	Genre	Notes
Abujh Mon	Swapan Saha	Prosenjit Chatterjee, Rituparna Sengupta	Romance	
Baksho Rahashya	Sandip Ray	Sabyasachi Chakraborty, Saswata Chatterjee	Drama	
Banaphul	Samit Bhanja	Samit Bhanja, Indrani Haldar	Romance	
Beadap	Dulal Bhowmick	Arun Bannerjee, Nimu Bhowmick, Soma Chakraborty		
Bhai Amar Bhai	Swapan Saha	Prosenjit Chatterjee	Romance, drama	
Bhoy	Chiranjeet Chakraborty	Chiranjeet Chakraborty, Debashree Roy, Shankar Chakraborty	Thriller	
Biyer Phool	Ram Mukherjee	Prosenjit Chatterjee, Rani Mukherji, Indrani Haldar		
Damu	Raja Sen	Raghubir Yadav, Sabyasachi Chakraborty	Children's	
Himghar	Sandip Ray	Anup Kumar, Dhritiman Chatterjee, Dipankar De	Drama	
Jamaibabu	Dulal Bhowmik	Tapas Paul, Satabdi Roy	Drama	
Jhinuk Mala	Swapan Saha	Prosenjit Chatterjee, Basanti Chattopadhyay, Sumit Ganguly		
Lathi	Prabhat Roy	Victor Bannerjee, Soumitra Chatterjee, Satabdi Roy	Drama	
Mahaan	Pijush Bose	Victor Banerjee, Chumki Chowdhury, Ranjit Mallick	Action	
Mukhyamantri	Anjan Choudhury	Chumki Chowdhury, Ashok Kumar, Ranjit Mallick	Political drama	
Naach Nagini Naach Re	Anjan Choudhury	Ranjit Mallick, Chumki Chowdhury, Tota Roy Choudhury	Drama	
Parikrama	Shantimoy Banerjee	Moon Moon Sen, Indrani Dutta, Anil Chatterjee	Devotional	
Path Beepath	Aurobinda Ghosh	Anjan Mitra, Lily Chandra, Debashish Bardan	Romance, drama	
Puja	Subhash Sen	Anil Chatterjee, Manoj Mitra, Sreela Majumdar		
Rabibar	Nitish Mukherjee	Ranjit Mallick, Debashree Roy, Sabyasachi Chakraborty	Drama	
Sakhi Tumi Kar	Swapan Saha	Abhishek Chatterjee, Prosenjit Chatterjee, Satabdi Roy		
Sinthir Sindoor	Anup Sengupta	Tapas Paul, Nayna Das, Gita Dey	Devotional	
Tarini Tarama	Bhupen Roy	Sandhya Roy, Papiya Adhikari, Gita Dey	Devotional	
Tridhara	Prasanta Nanda	Arjun Chakraborty, Chiranjit Chakraborty, Indrani Dutta		

== 1997 ==
Title	Director	Cast	Genre	Notes
Abhisapta Prem	Manoj Sen	Tapas Paul, Satabdi Roy		
Nayantara (film)	Raja Mitra	Saswata Chatterjee, Sabitri Chatterjee, Swarup Dutt		
Achena Atithi	Asim Samanta	Ashok Kumar, Raakhee	Romantic drama, thriller	
Adarer Bon	Swapan Saha	Prosenjit Chatterjee, Rituparna Sengupta	Drama	
Ajker Santan	Haranath Chakraborty	Ranjit Mallick, Prosenjit Chatterjee		
Baharupa	D.S. Sultania	Kaushik Bannerjee, Sangamitra Bannerjee, Tito Bannerjee		
Bakul Priya	Swapan Saha	Prosenjit Chatterjee, Satabdi Roy	Drama	
Baro Bou	Subhash Sen	Ranjit Mallick, Chumki Chowdhury, Lokesh Ghosh	Drama	
Bidroho	Haranath Chakraborty	Prosenjit Chatterjee, Satabdi Roy, Ranjit Mallick		
Chandra Grahan	Anjan Banerjee	Prosenjit Chatterjee, Rituparna Sengupta, Chiranjeet Chakraborty	Romance, drama	
Dabidar	Shyamal Bose	Tapas Paul, Indrani Haldar, Laboni Sarkar	Drama	
Dahan	Rituparno Ghosh	Indrani Haldar, Rituparna Sengupta	Social drama	
Dus Number Bari	Biresh Chatterjee	Satya Bannerjee, Shakuntala Barua, Shankar Chakraborty		
Gosainpur Sargaram	Sandip Ray	Sabyasachi Chakraborty, Saswata Chatterjee, Rabi Ghosh		
Jiban Youban	Dulal Bhowmick	Ajoy Bannerjee, Arun Bannerjee, Diptesh Bannerjee		
Kaal Ratri	Ujjal Chatterjee	Soumitra Chatterjee, Anusuya Majumdar, Pradip Mukherjee	Drama	
Kahini	Malay Bhattacharya	Rabi Ghosh, Dhritiman Chatterjee	Drama	
Lal Darja	Budhhadeb Dasgupta	Indrani Halder, Biplab Chatterjee	Allegorical drama	
Loafer	Bablu Sammadar	Ranjit Mallick, Chumki Chowdhury, Lokesh Ghosh	Action	
Manasa Kanya	Sujit Guha	Shakuntala Barua, Sabitri Chatterjee, Sanjib Dasgupta		
Mayar Badhon	Swapan Saha	Prosenjit Chatterjee, Srabanti Chatterjee, Satabdi Roy	Drama	
Mittir Barir Chhoto Bou	Sushil Mukhopadhyay	Abhishek Chatterjee, Anil Chatterjee	Drama	
Moner Manush	Sujit Guha	Prosenjit Chatterjee, Rituparna Sengupta, Shakti Kapoor	Action	
Niranjan Dwip	Kumar Swapan	Kumar Swapan, Suchandra, Nirmal Kumar	Drama	
Nishpap Asami	Swapan Saha	Chiranjit Chakraborty, Rituparna Sengupta, Abhishek Chatterjee	Drama	
Pabitra Papi	Anup Sengupta	Prosenjit Chatterjee, Soumitra Chatterjee	Drama	
Pita Mata Santan	Swapan Saha	Bhaskar Bannerjee, Abhishek Chatterjee, Basanti Chatterjee		
Pratirodh	Srinivas Chakraborty	Tapas Paul, Satabdi Roy, Sumitra Mukherjee	Action	
Sabar Upare Maa	Swapan Saha	Chiranjeet Chakraborty, Abhishek Chatterjee	Drama	
Sedin Chaitramash	Prabhat Roy	Indrani Dutta, Sanjib Dasgupta, Dipankar Dey		
Tomake Chai	Swapan Saha	Prosenjit Chatterjee, Rituparna Sengupta, Aditi Chatterjee		

== 1998 ==
Title	Director	Cast	Genre	Notes
Aamar Maa	Dilip Biswas	Prosenjit Chatterjee, Ranjit Mallick	Romance	
Aami Sei Meye	Prosenjit Chatterjee	Prosenjit Chatterjee, Rituparna Sengupta, Ranjit Mallick	Action drama	
Ajab Gayer Ajab Katha	Tapan Sinha	Soumitra Chatterjee, Debashree Roy	Romance	
Ami Je Tomari	Milan Bhowmick	Rajshree Bannerjee, Sanghamitra Bannerjee, Soumitra Bannerjee		
Asol Nakol	Bablu Samaddar	Nimu Bhowmick, Biplab Chatterjee, Sabitri Chatterjee		
Banglar Badhu	Anup Sengupta	Abhishek Chatterjee, Sabitri Chatterjee	Drama	
Bishnu Narayan	Sanat Dutta	Tom Alter, Lily Chakravarty, Chiranjit Chakraborty		
Chowdhury Paribar	Bablu Sammadar	Prosenjit Chatterjee, Indrani Haldar, Abhishek Chatterjee	Romance	
Gharer Laxmi	Swapan Saha	Aparajita, Abhishek Chatterjee, Biplab Chatterjee		
Hothat Brishti	Basu Chatterjee	Ferdous Ahmed, Priyanka Trivedi	Drama	
Kamalar Banabas	Swapan Saha	Kaushik Bannerjee, Rimashree Biswas, Subhendu Chatterjee		
Mayer Adhikar	Narayan Ghosh	Lily Chakravarty, Biplab Chatterjee, Prosenjit Chatterjee		
Nayaner Alo	Swapan Saha	Prosenjit Chatterjee, Tapas Paul, Indrani Haldar		
Pranar Cheye Priyo	Swapan Saha	Prosenjit Chatterjee, Rituparna Sengupta, Tapas Paul		
Putrabadhu	Pallab Ghosh	Soumitra Chatterjee, Tapas Paul, Debashree Roy	Drama	
Raja Rani Badsha	Haranath Chakraborty	Shakil Khan, Satabdi Roy	Drama	
Ranokhetro	Haranath Chakraborty	Prosenjit Chatterjee, Satabdi Roy, Ranjit Mallick	Action thriller	
Shimul Parul	Swapan Saha	Tapas Paul, Satabdi Roy, Bhaskar Bannerjee		
Sindurer Adhikar	Anup Sengupta	Prosenjit Chatterjee, Ranjit Mallick, Rituparna Sengupta	Drama	
Sundari	Swapan Saha	Basanti Chatterjee, Biplab Chatterjee, Prosenjit Chatterjee		
Swamir Aadesh	Swapan Saha	Prosenjit Chatterjee, Abhishek Chatterjee, Biplab Chatterjee	Drama	
Tomar Amar Prem	M.M. Sarkar	Rituparna Sengupta, Amin Khan, Sanghamitra Bannerjee		

== 1999 ==
Title	Director	Cast	Genre	Notes
Agni Shikha	Sujit Guha	Prosenjit Chatterjee, Ranjit Mallick	Romance	
Anu	Satarupa Sanyal	Indrani Haldar, Abani Bhattacharya	Romance	
Asukh	Rituparno Ghosh	Soumitra Chatterjee, Debashree Roy	Drama	
Chena Achena	Subhas Sen	Biplab Chatterjee, Abhishek Chatterjee, Rituparna Sengupta	Drama	
Dai Ditya	Haranath Chakraborty	Prosenjit Chakraborty, Rituparna Sengupta, Indrani Halder		
Gariber Samman	Swapan Saha	Moumita Chakraborty, Soumitra Chatterjee, Subhendu Chatterjee		
Jibon Niye Khela	Anjan Choudhury	Ranjit Mallick, Biplab Chatterjee	Drama	
Kali Aamar Maa	Shantilal Soni	Sangamitra Bannerjee, Utpal Basu, Soma Chakraborty		
Kanchanmala	Swapan Saha	Kaushik Bannerjee, Moumitra Chakraborty, Rahul Chakraborty		
Madhu Malati	Swapan Saha	Kaushik Bannerjee, Prosenjit Chatterjee, Soumitra Chatterjee		
Neoti	Bablu Samaddar	Ranjit Mallick, Satya Bannerjee, Haradan Bannerjee		
Parampar	Pranab Kumar Das	Baby Sarkar, Subhra Basu, Meghnad Bhattacharya		
Prem Priti Bhalobasha	Chittaranjan Das	Papia Adhikari, Arjun Chakraborty, Shakuntala Barua		
Ranga Bou	Mohammed Mohsin	Rituparna Sengupta, Amin Khan, Babor		
Sankha Sindurer Dibbye	Ratul Ganguly	Chiranjeet Chakraborty, Rituparna Sengupta, Abhishek Chatterjee	Drama	
Santan	Anjan Choudhury	Ranjit Mallick, Tapas Paul	Drama	
Santan Jakhan Satru	Swapan Saha	Ramaprasad Banik, Moumita Chakraborty, Prosenjit Chakraborty		
Satru Mitra	Naryan Ghosh	Sandipa Bannerjee, Nimu Bhowmick, Shankar Chakraborty		
Satyam Shivam Sundaram	Swapan Saha	Kaushik Bannerjee, Prosenjit Chatterjee, Soumitra Chatterjee		
Shasti Holo	Dipen Paul	Sanghamitra Bannerjee, Tuhin Bannerjee, Bhagro Bhattacharya		
Shudhu Ekbar Bolo	Provat Roy	Prosenjit Chatterjee, Ranjit Mallick		
Sindur Khela	Partho Ghosh	Prasenjit Chatterjee, Chiranjit Chakraborty, Supriya Choudhury		
Siraj	Ranen Modok	Arjun Chakraborty, Mita Chatterjee, Tarun Kumar Chatterjee		
Sudhu Ekbar Bolo	Provat Roy	Prosenjit Chatterjee, Ranjit Mallick	Romance	
Sundar Bou	Sujit Guha	Ranjit Mallick, Tapas Paul, Debashree Roy	Social drama	
Swamir Ghar	Swapan Saha	Soumitra Chatterjee, Prosenjit Chatterjee, Rituparna Sengupta	Drama	
Swapno Niye	Bishnu Pal Choudhury	Sanjib Dasgupta, Arindam Sil, Indrani Dutta	Drama	
Yugabatar Lokenath	Nandan Dasgupta	Abhishek Chatterjee, Satabdi Roy, Arun Bandopadhyay	Devotional	
