= Ek Pashla Bristi =

1991 Bengali romance film by Nitish Ray

- Directed by: Nitish Ray
- Starring: Prosenjit Chatterjee; Sreela Majumdar; Soumitra Chatterjee
- Music by: Rocket Mondal
- Production company: Sudharati International
- Distributed by: Parash Pictures
- Release date: 15 November 1991
- Running time: 123 minutes
- Country: India
- Language: Bengali

Ek Pashla Bristi, pronounced as Ek Poshla Brishti, is a 1991 Indian Bengali romance film directed by Nitish Ray featuring Prosenjit Chatterjee, Soumitra Chatterjee, Sreela Majumdar, Anup Kumar and Dipankar Dey in the lead roles. The film has musical score by Rocket Mondal.

== Plot ==
Rahul who is not interested in going to college aspires to work as a motor mechanic. Though crestfallen, his father, who wishes him to have a more secure future, diverts his decision by getting him a job in a hotel in Calcutta through an old acquaintance. However, the real trouble begins when the friend demands a large share of the tips which Rahul gets from his customers. Rahul is terminated but manages to persuade his employer to allow him to remain as a helper in the kitchen.

Rahul receives a letter from his friend inviting him to the latter's sister's wedding. There he happens to meet his friend's cousin Ratna. Meanwhile, several altercations arise between Rahul and his friend leading to fights and the arrest of Rahul. Ratna manages to bail him out by signing a few important papers.

Somnath Saha, a famous director, wishes to promote Ratna though she is not interested in it. He tries to convince her but fails miserably. Rahul and Ratna become close friends and at the end of the year he quits his job at the hotel. An old colleague, D'Souza, who has set up his own hotel offers a job for Rahul. Rahul accepts the job as the hotel manager and travels to Bombay.

Ratna moves to Bombay and happens to come across Rahul who has purchased that hotel from D'Souza. Though Rahul puts forward a marriage proposal, she asks him to wait until she gets a proper job. Both of them gradually drift apart. Somnath Saha decides to kill Ratna in a hotel after coming to know that she knows the hidden truth behind his wife's death. Rahul manages to reach there in time and rescues her from Saha. He leaves her finding that she has not yet achieved her goal. Rahul invites his parents to his hotel who are overwhelmed by their son's success. As he tries to make them comfortable he gets a call from Ratna who intends to leave Bombay. She has a change of heart. Rahul goes to the railway station where he manages to trace her from the large crowd and they unite.

== Cast ==
- Soumitra Chatterjee
- Prosenjit Chatterjee
- Sreela Majumdar
- Deepankar Dey
- Anup Kumar
- Dulal Lahiri
- Manjula Das
- Ritu Das
- Nita Gupta
- Rajatava Dutta

== See also ==
- Apaman
- Jhankar
- Prem Pujari
- Purushottam
- Pabitra Papi
