= Bou =

Bou or BOU may refer to:

- AFC Bournemouth, an English football team
- Bou, Loiret, a town and commune in northern-central France
- Bou (name)
- Bank of Uganda
- Basis of Union (disambiguation), various organizations
- British Ornithologists' Union
- Boulder Geomagnetic Observatory
- Bou (film), a 1998 Indian Odia-language drama film
- Bou, a series of interconnected Indian Bengali-language films including
  - Choto Bou (1988)
  - Mejo Bou (1995)
  - Baro Bou (1997)
  - Sundar Bou (1999)
  - Sejo Bou (2003)
- Taego Bou, monk of Goryeo
