= Pallavi Chatterjee =

Indian film actress (born 1965)

- Born: Jayeeta Chatterjee; 30 October 1965 (age 60)
- Other name: Maku
- Occupations: Actress; producer
- Years active: 1986–present
- Notable work: Dosar
- Children: 1
- Parents: Biswajit Chatterjee (father); Ratna Chatterjee (mother)
- Relatives: Prosenjit Chatterjee (brother)
- Awards: Kalakar Awards
- Website: www.pallavichatterjee.com

Pallavi Chatterjee (born 30 October 1965) is an Indian actress and producer who is known for her works in Bengali Film Industry. She is best known for her role as Brinda in Rituparno Ghosh's Dosar (2006). She is the recipient of Kalakar Awards for two times.

Born to actor Biswajit Chatterjee, Chatterjee made her acting debut opposite Arindam Ganguly. Her first big screen venture was Sujit Guha's Amar Prem in 1989 that stars her brother Prosenjit Chatterjee and Juhi Chawla as the protagonists. She made her Bollywood debut with Vinod Talwar's Teri Talash Mein (1990).

== Filmography ==
=== Films ===
Year	Title	Role	Note	Ref.
1989	Amar Prem		Credited as Jayeeta Chatterjee	
1990	Badnaam			
1990	Kalanka		Credited as Jayeeta Chatterjee	
1990	Paapi			
1990	Teri Talash Mein		Hindi film	
1991	Ananda Niketan			
1992	Apan Por			
1992	Purushottam			
1993	Atithi Shilpi			
1993	Rajar Meye Parul			
1994	Phiriye Dao			
1994	Pratyaghat			
1995	Jiban Yoddha			
1995	Kencho Khurte Keute			
1996	Abujh Mon			
1996	Banaphul			
1996	Beyadap			
1996	Joy Bijoy			
1996	Joto Kando Kathmandute	Ranjana Bose		
1996	Karna			
1996	Lathi			
1996	Sinthir Sindoor			
	Yugant			
1997	Ajker Santan			
1997	Matribhumi			
1997	Pabitra Papi			
1998	Jiban Trishna			
1999	Khelaghar			
1999	Shudhu Ekbar Bolo			
2000	Madhur Milan			
2003	Sharbari			
2005	Ek Mutho Chabi			
2006	Aamra			
2006	Dosar	Brinda		
2012	Bedroom			
2013	Aborto			
2013	Encounter			
2013	Ganesh Talkies			
2014	Khaad			
2015	Shudhu Tomari Jonyo			
2017	Guha Manab			
2019	Bhul Anko			
2019	Gumnaami	Lolita Bose	Cameo	
2019	Shah Jahan Regency			
2019	Shesher Golpo			
2019	Thai Curry			

=== TV series ===
Year	Title	Role	Ref.
1993	Shubhoratri		
2021	Amra 2GayTher		
2025	Khakee: The Bengal Chapter		
