= Sundar Bou =

1999 film

- Directed by: Sujit Guha
- Starring: Ranjit Mallick; Tapas Paul; Debashree Roy; Lily Chakraborty
- Music by: Anupam Dutta
- Production company: Jayasree Sahabadi
- Release date: 22 January 1999
- Country: India
- Language: Bengali

Sundar Bou (transl. lovely wife) (Bengali: সুন্দর বউ) is a 1999 Bengali drama film directed by Sujit Guha.

== Plot ==
Nanda's stepmother fixes his marriage with Sabitri. However, after marriage, Sabitri is exploited by the stepmother. When Sabitri's uncle learns about it, he decides to help her.

== Cast ==
- Ranjit Mallick
- Tapas Paul
- Debashree Roy
- Lily Chakraborty
- Dilip Ray
- Mrinal Mukherjee
- Subhendu Chatterjee
- Gracy singh (Item dance)

== Music ==
The film's music was composed by Anupam Dutta.
