= Shesh Ashray =

2001 film by Ajit Ganguly

- Directed by: Ajit Ganguly
- Produced by: Tushar Kanti Jana
- Starring: Lily Chakraborty; Indrani Haldar; Arjun Chakraborty; Sandhyarani; Satya Bandyopadhyay; Shubhendu Chattopadhyay; Shakuntala Barua
- Music by: Anupam Dutta
- Release date: 2001
- Country: India
- Language: Bengali

Shesh Ashray is a Bengali 2001 film directed by Ajit Ganguly and produced by Tushar Kanti Jana. The music of the film was composed by Anupam Dutta.

== Cast ==
- Indrani Haldar
- Lily Chakraborty
- Arjun Chakraborty
- Satya Bandyopadhyay
- Shubhendu Chattopadhyay
- Shakuntala Barua

== Soundtrack ==
All songs were composed by Anupam Dutta and lyrics by Pulak Banerjee.

- "Bhulchho Keno Ei Je Ami" – Kumar Sanu, Anupama Deshpande
- "Ami Achhi Sukhe Achhi" (duet) – Kumar Sanu, Anupama Deshpande
- "Ami Achhi Sukhe Achhi" (female) – Anupama Deshpande
- "Biyer Aage Prem Bhalo Na" – Kumar Sanu
- "Ektu Pore Brishti Jani" – Anuradha Paudwal
- "Dukkho Kiser Kanna Kiser" – Sadhana Sargam
- "
