= Chaowa Pawa =

Chaowa Pawa (lit. 'Wanted' in Bengali) may refer to these Indian films:

- Chaowa Pawa (1959 film), a film directed by Dilip Mukherjee, Tarun Majumdar, and Sachin Mukherjee (collectively Yatrik)
- Chaowa Pawa (2009 film), a film directed by Swapan Saha
