= Pratham Kadam Phool =

1969 Indian Bengali-language film

- DVD cover
- Original title: প্রথম কদম ফুল
- Directed by: Inder Sen
- Written by: Achintya Kumar Sengupta
- Screenplay by: Inder Sen
- Based on: Prothom Kadam Phool by Achintya Kumar Sengupta
- Produced by: Dipangshu Kumar Deb
- Starring: Soumitra Chatterjee; Tanuja; Subhendu Chatterjee; Chhaya Devi; Tarun Kumar Chatterjee
- Cinematography: Sailaja Chatterjee
- Edited by: Arabinda Bhattacharya
- Music by: Sudhin Dasgupta
- Distributed by: Ikans Films
- Release date: 31 December 1969 (India)
- Running time: 70 minutes
- Country: India
- Language: Bengali

Pratham Kadam Phool is a 1969 Indian Bengali film, written and directed by Inder Sen, based on an eponymous story by Achintya Kumar Sengupta. It stars Tanuja and Soumitra Chatterjee in the lead. The film was produced by Dipangshu Kumar Deb, and edited by Arabinda Bhattacharya.

== Plot ==
Sukanta meets Kakali in a library reading room and discovers his passion for her, though she rejects him initially. Pranta's wife, Sukanta's sister in law, suspects the truth yet does not dare to encourage the affair since Sukanta is not established. On another day, Kakali and Sukanta become stranded in a library lift for many hours as electric power goes off. Here, they become close to each other, and start meeting frequently thereafter. Later, Sukanta comes to the house of Kakali, but her parents do not approve of him. Sukanta meets Baren, his school friend, who is now very well off. Baren works with a European firm in a high post. He has a four-wheeler and a flat where he stays with his widowed mother. Baren's mother wishes to get her son a suitable bride. Kakali comes to the house of Sukanta one day. Every single member of Sukanta's family likes her. In fact, the mother of Sukanta wants them to marry. The parents of Kakali refuse. So Kakali leaves her parents. She joins Baren's office as a receptionist. And trouble starts in Sukanta's family. Sukanta the research scholar misjudges the relation of Kakali and Baren. Kakali leaves one day after a heated exchange. The nephew of Sukanta, who loves his aunt, misses her. He goes missing. In the meantime, Baren hears about everything from Kakali and he takes the initiative to solve it. Ultimately Kakali comes to the police station, where a happy reunion takes place.

== Cast ==
- Soumitra Chatterjee as Sukanto Basu
- Tanuja as Kakoli Mitra
- Subhendu Chatterjee as Baren
- Chhaya Devi as Sukanto's Mother
- Shamit Bhanja as Bhajahari Manna (singer in Picnic)
- Subrata Chatterjee as Sukanto's sister in law
- Anubha Gupta as Sukanto's aunt
- Padmadevi as Baren's mother (as Padma Devi)
- Sadhana Roychoudhury as Kakoli's mother
- Tarun Kumar Chatterjee as Prashanta (Sukanto's brother)
- Shailen Mukherjee as Sukanto's father
- Ajit Banerjee
- Mihir Bhattacharya
- Bhanu Banerjee as Servant (Kakoli's home)
- Simantini Roy
- Raktim Ghoshal
- Fakir Das Kumar
- Rajlakshmi Devi
- Tushar Majumdar
- Prabir Roy

== Soundtrack ==
The film's soundtrack has been scored by Sudhin Dasgupta and three out of four songs were written by him. Pulak Banerjee wrote the song "Ami Shri Shri Bhojohori Manna".

Song	Singer
Kon Se Alor Swapno Niye	Asha Bhosle
Deke Deke Chole Gechhi	Asha Bhosle
Ei Shahar Theke Aaro Onek Dure	Manna Dey
Ami Shri Shri Bhojo Hori Manna	Manna Dey
