= Anupam Dutta =

Indian music director and composer

Anupam Dutta অনুপম দত্ত
- Occupations: Music director, Composer

Anupam Dutta (Bengali: অনুপম দত্ত, Hindi: अनुपम दत्ता) is an Indian music director and composer. He mainly contributed to the Bengali films directed by Swapan Saha.

== Discography ==
=== Composer ===
- Bhagya Chakra (2008)
- Greptar (2007)
- Sanghat (2007)
- Arjun (2006)
- Khalnayak (2006)
- Sukh Dukkher Sansar (2003)
- Ostad (2001)
- Shasti (2001)
- Shesh Ashray (2001)
- Mayna (2000)
- Parichay (2000)
- Sajoni Aamar Sohag (2000)
- Chena Achena (1999)
- Daye Dayitwa (1999)
- Sundar Bou (1999)
- Swamir Ghar (1999)
- Banglar Badhu (1998)
- Ganga (1998)
- Jiban Trishna (1998)
- Praner Cheye Priyo (1998)
- Putrabadhu (1998)
- Sindurer Adhikar (1998)
- Sundari (1998)
- Swamir Aadesh (1998)
- Adarer Bon (1997)
- Bhalobasa (1997)
- Matir Manush (1997)
- Mittir Barir Chhoto Bou (1997)
- Pabitra Papi (1997)
- Pita Mata Santan (1997)
- Sabar Upare Maa (1997)
- Yoddha (1997)
- Abujh Mon (1996)
- Bhai Amar Bhai (1996)
- Bhoy (film) (1996)
- Kencho Khunrte Keute (1995)
- Naginkanya (1995)
- Sansar Sangram (1995)
- Shesh Pratiksha (1995)
- Sujan Sakhi (1995)
