= Raghab Chatterjee =

Indian Bengali singer

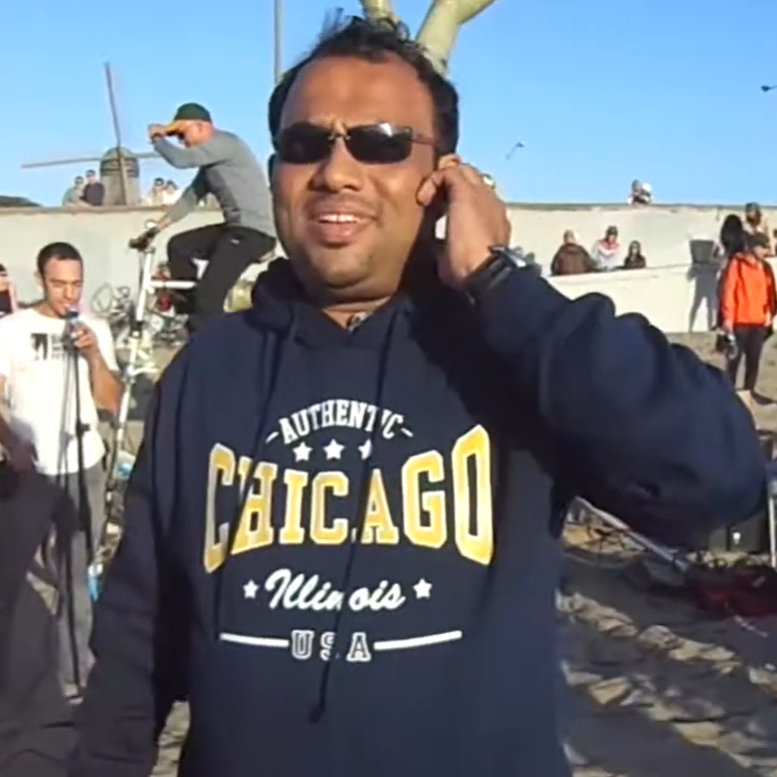
- Chatterjee in San Francisco, 2012

Background information
- Born: 25 January
- Genres: Adhunik Bengali Songs, Rabindra Sangeet, Nazrul Geeti
- Occupation: Singer

Raghab Chattopadhyay, also spelled as Raghav Chatterjee is an Indian Bengali singer. He mainly sings Bengali modern songs, Rabindra Sangeet and Nazrul Geeti. He has also worked as a playback singer in various Bengali and Hindi films. He was a judge of Sa Re Ga Ma Pa Bangla 2024.

== Early life and career ==
Chatterjee started his musical journey at the age of 9 by learning guitar. His mother Shila Chatterjee was a classical singer. His first lesson in music was from his mother. He is a student of Ajoy Chakrabarty and Rashid Khan.

He has worked as a playback singer in various films including Devdas (2002), Bandhan (2004), Raicoat (2004) Chaturanga (2008), Baishe Srabon (2011), Bawali Unlimited (2012) Bhooter Bhabishyat (2012), Encounter (2013), Dotara (2019). He was one of the featured vocalist in the archival musical series known as Acharya Pariwar, where he rendered several unreleased compositions of the maestro Acharya Jayanta Bose.

== Discography ==
=== Songs ===
- Chand Keno Aase Na

=== Albums ===
- Tumi Nei Bole
- Sharodia
- Name Plate
- Bhorer Alo
- Amar Akash
- Bhubanomohini
- Samiana
- Ebong Rabindranath
- Ebar Nazrul
