= Chayamurti =

2020 Indian Bengali film

Chayamurti is a Bengali horror film directed by Jeet Chatterjee and produced by Soma Das. The film was released on 6 March 2020 under the banner of Rajdeep Films and Productions.

== Plot ==
Monika, a young girl, got a job in a doctor's chamber. She faced some mysterious and horrible incidents there and informs her boyfriend about it. He ignores, considering this is her hallucination. Finally Monika dies, but after her unnatural death her vengeful spirit revives.

== Cast ==
- Abhishek Chatterjee as Doctor
- Sumana Das
- Sabyasachi Chowdhury
- Soma Das
- Subhayan Roy
