= Sivanath Sastri College =

Undergraduate college for women in south Kolkata

- Motto: IAST: śhraddhāvān labhate jñānaṁ
- Type: Undergraduate college
- Established: 1961; 65 years ago
- Affiliations: University of Calcutta
- Principal: Dr. Runa Biswas
- Location: 23/49, Gariahat Rd, Dhakuria, Kankulia, Jodhpur Park, Kolkata, West Bengal, 700029, India; 22°30′56″N 88°22′5.52″E
- Campus: Urban
- Website: sivnathsastricollege.org

- Location within Kolkata Location within India

Sivanath Sastri College is an undergraduate college for women in Kolkata, India, and is popularly referred to as South City Morning. It is affiliated with the University of Calcutta. The name commemorates the legacy of Brahmo social reformer Sivanath Sastri. It shares premises with Heramba Chandra College (popularly known as South City Day) and Prafulla Chandra College (popularly known as South City Evening).

== Library ==
The library was founded on the ideals of the nineteenth century Brahmo educational movement with its focus on providing quality education to women as pioneered by Pandit Sivanath Sastri.

=== The collection ===
The library has a collection of more than 39,000 volumes which also include a small collection of conventional reference books. The library functions as a consortium of five separate units: the Central library, the Honours Seminar library, the Staff-room library, the Departmental library of Geography and the Departmental library of Botany. While all accredited users may access the Central library, access to the Honours Seminar library is restricted to the Honours students and teachers. The staffroom library is for class room reference, while the departmental libraries are for use by the teachers and the students of the respective departments. Apart from the books acquired under college grant and UGC grant there is a small collection of books donated by the users and well wishers named "Prafulla Chandra Roy Text Book Library".

=== Facilities provided ===
The central library provides a large reading room capable of accommodating more than 70 readers at a time. Other facilities include the UGC book bank for needy students, access to the internet is also provided to the users at the central library. Readers have access to UGC INFLIBNET's N-LIST e-resource consortia for full text journals and e-books.

=== Computerization of the library ===
Computerized automation of the library started in 2004 using the WinISIS software. Responding to changes in technology, the library today uses the open source library management software Koha to meet its automation needs. The online public access catalog (OPAC) is available and can be accessed at http://ssclib-opac.l2c2.co.in/

== Accreditation ==
Sivanath Sastri College is recognized by the University Grants Commission (UGC). The college is also accredited by National Assessment and Accreditation Council (NAAC).

== Notable alumni ==
- Indrani Dutta
- Koneenica Banerjee

== See also ==
- List of colleges affiliated to the University of Calcutta
- Education in India
- Education in West Bengal
