= Apaman =

1988 Bengali film by Chandan Mukherjee

- Directed by: Chandan Mukherjee
- Produced by: Screen & Publicities
- Starring: Prosenjit; Tarun Kumar; Sandhyarani; Sekhar Chattopadhyay
- Music by: Robin Banerjee
- Production companies: Screen & Publicities
- Release date: 1988
- Country: India
- Language: Bengali

Apaman is a 1988 Indian Bengali film bankrolled by Screen & Publicities and directed by Chandan Mukherjee with a musical score by Robin Banerjee. Prosenjit, Tarun Kumar, Sandhyarani appeared in the lead roles.

== Cast ==
- Sandhyarani
- Prosenjit Chatterjee
- Abhishek Chatterjee
- Indrani Dutta
- Joyshree Roy (Jaishree Roy Harmalkar) aka Shaniya
- Tarun Kumar
- Abhijit Sen
- Shekhar Chattopadhyay
- Sailen Mukhopadhyay
- Lolita Chattopadhyay
- Master Manku
- Master Sudip
