= Tumi Je Aamar =

1994 film

- Directed by: Inder Sen
- Produced by: Kamal Patodia; Suresh Jain; Pavan Kaneria
- Starring: Ranjit Mallick; Prosenjit Chatterjee; Tapas Paul; Satabdi Roy; Indrani Dutta
- Music by: Babul Bose
- Release date: 15 July 1994
- Country: India
- Language: Bengali

Tumi Je Aamar (transl. You are mine) (Bengali: তুমি যে আমার) is a 1994 Bengali drama film directed by Inder Sen starring Ranjit Mallick, Anuradha Ray, Prosenjit Chatterjee, Satabdi Roy, Tapas Paul and Indrani Dutta in lead roles. The film's music was composed by Babul Bose. It is remake of Judai starring Jeetendra & Rekha.

== Plot ==
The story begins with Arun Choudhury and Sujata Choudhury as happy couple living together and leading a happy life with their son Suman. Arun Choudhury is a doctor by profession. One day, in his clinic comes Seema who was Arun's college best friend. Arun used to like her a lot during college. Arun and Sujata went to dinner that night along with Seema. Arun's best friend Avik had a very lovely romantic nature. He used to write poetry for his love life and always dreamt himself of as a romantic person. He used to be a regular visitor to Arun's clinic. On their wedding anniversary, Arun and Sujata invited Seema to their party where she saw Seema had a strong bond and liking towards Arun which she strongly opposed to. One fateful night, Seema's son died due to high fever and complications. Seema blamed Arun for all these as he was the sole doctor they were visiting. Frustrated, Arun reached his house and there ensued a strong quarrel between Arun and Sujata which led Sujata leave the house. Sujata was a pregnant woman and she decided to stay away from Arun. After few days, Sujata gave birth to a boy named Rahul.

Staying away for many years led Arun and Sujata feel deserted while Rahul and Suman grew up to be good friends. Upon recommended by Arun, Rahul got a job in Avik's industry where he started liking Soma whereas Suman started liking Riya after saving her from a gang of goons. After few days Suman and Riya married to each other and came to take blessings from Sujata unaware that she is none other than his biological mother. Sujata came to know that Suman is her son and hugged him. She ensured that Arun would agree to their marriage as Arun was not agreed to their relationship. Sujata and Arun met each other and said all things also telling him Rahul is their son, on which Arun got ecstatic and happy. Rahul and Soma also married to each other and were spending happy days until their family problems came to hinder their path when Suman started disobeying his father and Rahul started to live in his in-laws house with his wife leaving both of their parents alone. Finally, Arun and Sujata met each other and everything became good with all members again came upon rejoicing and thinking about the well-being of their parents. Everyone started living happily thereafter.

== Cast ==
- Ranjit Mallick as Arun Choudhury
- Anuradha Ray as Sujata Choudhury
- Tapas Paul as Suman Choudhury
- Prosenjit Chatterjee as Rahul Choudhury
- Satabdi Roy as Soma
- Indrani Dutta as Riya
- Chinmoy Roy
- Shakuntala Barua as Joyeeta Haldar
- Sanghamitra Bandyopadhyay as Seema
- Anamika Saha
- Ramaprasad Banik as Avik Haldar
- Debnath Chattopadhyay

== Soundtrack ==
The music was composed by Babul Bose.

=== Track listings ===
- "Tumi Je Aamar" -

Kumar Sanu

- "Dujone Bhabini Kono Din" -

Asha Bhosle

- "Tururu Turu Ruru" -

Kumar Sanu, Asha Bhosle

- "Chokhta Bhalo, Mukhta Bhalo" -

Kumar Sanu, Asha Bhosle

- "Alo Nive Asa Ek Diner Sheshe" -

Kumar Sanu, Deepa Narayan

- "Tomar Chokheri Kajole" -

Abhijeet, Kavita Krishnamurthy

- "Koya Karva Loya Karulu" -

Udit Narayan, Kavita Krishnamurthy

- Eso Tumi Buke Eso -

Udit Narayan

== Awards ==
BFJA Awards (1995):-

- Best Indian film Tumi Je Aamar
