= Encounter (2013 film) =

- Theatrical release poster
- Directed by: Suman Mukhopadhyay
- Written by: Suman Mukhopadhyay
- Produced by: Kamini Tewari
- Starring: Dheeraj Pandit; Koel Das; Ferdous Ahmed; Rajesh Sharma; Biswajit Chakraborty
- Cinematography: Suman Dutta
- Edited by: Atanu Ghose
- Music by: Shanku Mitra
- Release date: 13 September 2013
- Country: India
- Language: Bengali

Encounter is a 2013 Indian Bengali-language action thriller film directed by Suman Mukhopadhyay and produced by Kamini Tewari. The film features newcomers Dhiraj and Koel Das in the lead roles. Music of the film has been composed by Sanku Mitra.

== Plot ==
The story of the film revolves around the affinity between administration, police and the underworld. It depicts how our administrators make use of the underworld to fulfill their own wishes. The film is about four people who later become involved with the underworld.

== Cast ==
- Dheeraj Pandit
- Koel Das
- Ferdous Ahmed
- Rajesh Sharma
- Shantilal Mukherjee
- Pallavi Chatterjee
- Biswajit Chakraborty
- Rita Koyral
- Soumen Mahapatra

== Soundtrack ==
Encounter

Soundtrack album by Shanku Mitra
- Released: 2 September 2013
- Genre: Feature film soundtrack

Shanku Mitra chronology
Shudhu Tomar Jonyo (2007)	Encounter (2013)

Shanku Mitra composed the music for Encounter. Lyrics are penned by Goutam Sushmit. The music launch was held at The Park on 2 September 2013. The soundtrack consists of six tracks. The playback singers include Usha Uthup, Kumar Sanu, Rima, Mohammed Aziz, Archan, Sujoy Bhowmick, Raghab Chatterjee and Sanchita Bhattacharya.
