= Troyee =

- DVD cover
- Directed by: Gautam Mukherjee
- Written by: Gautam Mukherjee
- Screenplay by: Parthapratim Chowdhury
- Starring: Mithun Chakraborty; Debashree Roy; Soumitra Bannerjee
- Cinematography: Ratan Mukherjee
- Edited by: Tarun Dutta
- Music by: R. D. Burman
- Release date: 11 June 1982
- Running time: 120 minutes
- Country: India
- Language: Bengali

Troyee (transl. Trio) is a 1982 Indian Bengali-language romantic drama film written and directed by Gautam Mukherjee. The screenplay was written by Parthapratim Choudhury. It narrates the story of a young man who ultimately finds that his life belongs nowhere after he discovers that his best friend and his ladylove are in love with each other. It stars Mithun Chakraborty, Debashree Roy and Soumitra Bannerjee in leading roles. The music was composed by R. D. Burman with lyrics penned by Swapan Chakraborty.

The film was a musical blockbuster as well as a major success at the box office. It was remade into Odia as Saathire in 2004.

== Plot ==
Avik and Ranjan are best friends who befriend Seema, a girl who is two years junior to them at college. They quickly become great friends.

Avik's parents love all the youngsters as Ranjan is living away from his parents, while Seema's mother has died, especially Avik's mother, who Ranjan and Seema lovingly call Mashi-Ma (aunty). The three hang out at Avik's home frequently.

Ranjan lives alone, as his wealthy father has remarried. Due to this Ranjan's grandfather has left the business equally 50% in Ranjan's name and 50% in his father's name, sensing the future may not turn out well for Ranjan. To avoid conflicts Ranjan lives separately from his father and step-mother, although in a mansion nonetheless. Seema and Ranjan bond as they talk about life the struggles they go through. While all three are somewhat carefree and live the life of college students, Ranjan and Seema, maturing, share more serious matters with each other. Ranjan and Seema slowly start developing feelings towards each other. Both Avik and Ranjan separately, realize they have feelings for Seema. Both separately trying to figure out how to tell her they like her Avik decides to tell Seema he likes her, at her birthday, while Ranjan can't figure out how or when to tell her.

On Seema's birthday her father Mr. Bikash holds a big party. Upon arriving and seeing Seema's father, Mr. Bikash, for the first time Avik's mother faints. When they were younger Avik's mother and Seema's father were in love, but things ended badly for them and they ended up marrying different people. Avik, who was going to confess his feelings to Seema ends up not getting the chance to, as he take his mother home to take care of her. During the party Seema starts to notice she has feelings for someone and longing (Ranjan).

A Ranjan's uncle, a drunkard called Sawta, knows about this relationship from the past and why Avik's mother fainted. He actually has been blackmailing Mr. Bikash. In the meantime, Avik asks Seema to meet him, but when Seema comes to meet Avik, she arrives early. Ranjan arrives and asks Seema to speak. Seema knowing, she arrived early goes with Ranjan, where he confesses his feelings. Seema reciprocates the feelings and they become a couple. Avik arrives to meet Seema, but when he doesn't see her he waits and feels like he got stood up. Feeling betrayed, in love and in friendship he leaves, going to a bar. There Sawta adds to the drama by over stating the relationship between Ranjan and Seema. Avik gets into a fight at the bar. Later Seema meets him but he can't clearly state that he loves her... but Ranjan declares his love for Seema after Avik drops her off at her home, as they were hanging out and Ranjan was awaiting her to arrive.

Avik has an accident while riding his motorcycle. Avik is taken to the operation theatre, Ranjan gives him his own blood and finally he is saved. Seema goes to see Avik in the hospital where she leaves her purse. In it is a letter meant for Ranjan. Avik proposes to Seema but discovers that she loves Ranjan. Avik is very disappointed and upset. On the other hand, Seema's father Bikash asks her to marry Avik but she declines. Seema comes to Avik's father and tries to say everything, but she cannot. While Avik's parents think that Seema will marry their son, Avik tells them no, she is marrying Ranjan.

In the meantime Avik comes and realizes the truth, breaking his heart in the process. Avik meets Ranjan where initially trying to step aside, Avik tells him not to and that Ranjan should be marrying Seema. While it was unfortunate that they both love Seema the circumstances were accidental and they should both do what makes Seema happy. While Avik feels so happy for his friends he is heartbroken. Everything is prepared for Seema's marriage with Ranjan. Avik's mother is very sad and feels very sorry for Avik. On the day of the marriage ceremony the circumstances really hit Avik, being heartbroken he cannot accept the marriage between his best friend and his love. Conflicted in his happiness for them but being sad about losing out in love he leaves. While driving his car at a high speed, lost in thought and sorrow he loses control of his car.

== Cast ==
- Mithun Chakraborty as Avik
- Debashree Roy as Seema
- Soumitra Bannerjee as Ranjan
- Anil Chatterjee as Avik's father
- Ruma Guha Thakurta as Avik's mother
- Pradeep Kumar as Bikash, Seema's father
- Sujit Kumar as Ranjan's father
- Padma Khanna as Ranjan's secretary
- Helen special appearance in song Ektu Bosho
- Keshto Mukherjee as Ranjan's uncle and drunkard sawta

== Soundtrack ==
Music of this film is by R. D. Burman, all lyrics are written by Swapan Chakraborty.

Song	Singer
"Ek Tanete Jemon Temon, Du Tanete Rugi"	Kishore Kumar, Sapan Chakraborty
"Jana Ajaana Pathe Cholechhi"	Kishore Kumar, Asha Bhosle, R. D. Burman
"Aaro Kachhakachhi, Aaro Kachhe Eso"	Kishore Kumar, Asha Bhosle
"Ektu Bosho, Chole Jeyo Na"	Asha Bhosle
"Katha Hoyechhilo"	Asha Bhosle
"Kobe Je Kothay"	Bhupinder Singh
