= Prithibir Sesh Station =

1993 Indian Bengali mystery film

- Directed by: Lalit Mukhopadhyay
- Screenplay by: Lalit Mukhopadhyay
- Based on: Prithibir Sesh Station by Prafulla Roy
- Produced by: Moni Midda
- Starring: Prosenjit Chatterjee; Madhabi Mukherjee; Anup Kumar; Rupa Ganguly
- Cinematography: Shakti Bandhopadhyay
- Edited by: Snehasish Ganguly
- Music by: Rabi Bandyopadhyay
- Production company: Middya Films
- Release date: 1 October 1993
- Running time: 126 minutes
- Country: India
- Language: Bengali

Prithibir Sesh Station is a 1993 Indian Bengali thriller drama film directed by Lalit Mukhopadhyay. The film stars Prosenjit Chatterjee, Madhabi Mukherjee, Anup Kumar and Rupa Ganguly. The film was released on 1 October 1993 and is an adaptation of the novel of the same title by Prafulla Roy.

== Synopsis ==
When Jayanti is accused of killing a man who is believed to be behind the mysterious disappearance of her younger brother, Samaresh, her former lover tries to clear her name and solve the mystery.

== Music ==
The film has soundtrack composed by Rabi Bandyopadhyay with lyrics penned by Barun Biswas.

#	Title	Singer(s)
1	Bhalobasi	Shibaji Chatterjee
2	Chokher Jale	Shibaji Chatterjee
3	Khachar Pakhira Aaj	Sandhya Mukherjee
4	Rang Beranger	Manna Dey
5	Kon Holud Ranger	Kumar Sanu
6	Tumi Sandhya	Haimanti Sukla

== Cast ==
- Prosenjit
- Madhabi Mukherjee
- Rupa Ganguly
- Anup Kumar
- Nirmal Kumar
- Subhendu Chatterjee

== Sources ==
- Prithibir Sesh Station
