= Soumitra Banerjee =

Indian actor

Soumitra Bannerjee
- Born: 1954; Pandua, Hooghly, West Bengal, India
- Died: 8 January 2000 (aged 45); Kolkata, West Bengal, India
- Other names: Nanu Banerjee, Hobu Jamai, Mota Soumitra
- Occupation: Actor
- Years active: 1964–2000
- Known for: Troyee, Guru Dakshina

Soumitra Bannerjee (1954 – 8 January 2000) was an Indian actor who worked mainly in Bengali cinema. Some of his notable films are Amar Prem, Troyee, Guru Dakshina, IndrajIt, Bhoy, and Badnam. He is best known for playing villainous roles. He is famous for the quote Maaltake Garite Tol from Nawab.

== Biography ==
Soumitra Bannerjee was born in an aristocrat Zamindar family (Banerjee family of Damdama at Pandua, Hooghly). He was multitalented from his childhood. He began his career at the age of eight in Subha O Debotar Grash in 1964. In 1982 he was cast in the lead role in the movie Troyee opposite Debashree Roy and Mithun Chakraborty. The movie became a hit and he began to receive offers from directors afterwards. Despite his desire to play the protagonist, he soon became a typecast in negative roles, especially in the role of a spoilt son of a wealthy father. He has worked in many successful movies as an antagonist.

Soumitra Banerjee died on 8 January 2000. His last film was Khelaghar. Sarod maestro, music director and writer Abanindra Maitra was his nearest friend, they grew up together since childhood. He gave music in many of his films like Debotar Grash, Jeeban Sangra and others. Abanindra said Soumitra was a highly talented actor and a singer.

== Filmography ==
All films are in Bengali language, unless mentioned.

| Year | Film | Role |
|---|---|---|
| 1964 | Subha O Debatar Grash | |
| 1982 | Troyee | Ranjan |
| 1987 | Guru Dakshina | |
| 1986 | Ashirbad | |
| 1989 | Mangal Deep | |
| 1989 | Amar Prem | |
| 1987 | Pap Punya | |
| 1990 | Badnam | |
| 1990 | Ladai | |
| 1992 | Indrajit | Raja Sanyal |
| 1989 | Sreemati Hansraj | |
| 1989 | Satarupa | |
| 1992 | Anutap | |
| 1991 | Neelimay Neel | |
| 1992 | Pratham Dekha | |
| 1988 | Aagaman | |
| 1994 | Phiriye Dao | |
| 1989 | Asha O Bhalobasha | |
| 1994 | Bouma | |
| 1996 | Bhoy | |
| 1987 | Amar Sangi | |
| 1991 | Katha Dilam | |
| 1989 | Jhankar | |
| 1995 | Jeevan Yoddha | |
| 1994 | Rakta Nadir Dhara | |
| 1990 | Jibansangee | |
| 1988 | Sudhu Tomari | |
| 1991 | Ahankar | |
| 1986 | Abhisap | |
| 1990 | Alingan | Bikram |
| 1986 | Raj Purush | |
| 1998 | Ami Je Tomari | |
| 1990 | Anuraag | |
| 1988 | Anjali | |
| 1987 | Ekanto Apon | |
| 1992 | Jekhane Aashroy | |
| 1999 | Khelaghar | |

== Death ==
He died in 2000. He was survived by his wife, actress Rita Koiral.
