= Sandhyarani =

Bengali film actress

- Born: August 1922; Kolkata
- Died: 19 July 1999 (aged 76)
- Occupation: Actress
- Children: 1

Sandhyarani Chatterjee (widely known as Sandhyarani) was an Indian actress who is known for her work in Bengali cinema. She was a reigning actress of Bengali cinema during 1940s and 1950s. She appeared in more than 250 Bengali films. She made her silver screen debut in Sarbojanin Bibahotsab (26 April 1938). She featured opposite Uttam Kumar in Ajoy Kar's Bardidi (1957). Even after she played supporting characters later, her popularity remained intact.

== Career ==
In 1948, Sandhyarani featured as Gyanoda in Arakshaniya based on Sarat Chandra Chatterjee's much celebrated novel of the same name. Ajoy Bhattacharya cast her in his Bengali comedy film Chhadmabeshi (1944) (Note: In 1971, Agradoot remade this film under the same title starring Uttam Kumar. It became a massive financial success.) based on the story of the same name by Upendranath Gangopadhyay. Suchitra Sen eschewed the central role in Suryamukhi, Sandhyarani was offered to play the concerned role.

== Filmography ==
Key
§	Indicates a short film

Year	Title	Note	Ref.
1938	Sarbojanin Bibahotsab	Debut, Credited as Angur	
1938	Jagapisi §	Credited as Angur	
1938	Bekar Nashan	Credited as Angur	
1941	Banglar Meye		
1941	Mayer Pran		
1941	Nandini		
1941	Shakuntala		
1941	Sreeradha		
1941	Pratishodh		
1942	Bhishma		
1942	Bondi		
1942	Parineeta		
1943	Jogajog		
1943	Sahadharmini		
1943	Samadhan		
1944	Chhadmabeshi		
1945	Mane Na Mana		
1946	Natun Bou		
1946	Pather Sathi		
1946	Saat Number Bari		
1946	Sangram		
1946	Tumi Aar Ami		
1947	Tapobhanga		
1948	Arakshaniya		
1948	Drishtidan		
1948	Purabi		
1948	Sabyasachi	Bharti	
1948	Sahara		
1948	Shankha Sindur		
1948	Shyamaler Swapno		
1949	Abhiman		
1949	Bisher Dhoan		
1949	Herfer		
1949	Nireddesh		
1951	Darpachurna		
1951	Ganyer Meye		
1951	Panditmashai		
1952	Bindur Chhele		
1952	Kapalkundala		
1952	Sanjibani		
1952	Rani Bhabani		
1953	Haranath Pandit		
1953	Harilakshmi		
1953	Nishkriti		
1953	Rami Chandidas		
1954	Amar Prem		
1954	Mantra Shakti		
1955	Bidhilipi		
1955	Bratacharini		
1955	Hrad		
1956	Abhagir Swarga		
1956	Dhular Dharani		
1956	Mahakabi Girishchandra		
1956	Mahanisha		
1956	Sinthir Sindur		
1957	Adarsha Hindu Hotel		
1957	Bardidi		
1957	Prithibi Amare Chaay		
1957	Tapasi		
1960	Mayamriga		
1963	Akashpradip		
1963	Badsha (1963 film)		
1964	Deep Nebhe Nai		
1976	Hansaraj		
1985	Parama		
1988	Apaman		
1989	Aghatan Ajo Ghate		
1989	Aparanher Alo		
2001	Shesh Ashray	Posthumous release	
