= Greptar =

Greftaar
- Theatrical release poster
- Directed by: Swapan Saha
- Written by: N.K Salil
- Screenplay by: N.K Salil
- Story by: N.K Salil
- Produced by: Rashika Chatterjee
- Starring: See below
- Cinematography: V. Satish
- Edited by: Suresh Urs
- Music by: Anupam Dutta
- Distributed by: Eskay Movies
- Release date: 14 December 2007
- Running time: 161 minutes
- Country: India
- Language: Bengali

Greftaar (Bengali: গ্রেপ্তার) (English: Arrest) is a 2007 Bengali action thriller film directed by Swapan Saha and produced by Rashika Chatterjee under the banner of Maa Karunamoyee Films. The film features actors Prosenjit Chatterjee, Swastika Mukherjee, Tapas Paul, Ashish Vidyarthi and Locket Chatterjee in the lead roles. The music was composed by Anupam Dutta.

== Plot ==
Arun Roy, an honest police sub-inspector, stopped the car of Indrajit, a political leader and brother to the Superintendent of Police, Balaram Babu. Arun was suspended from his job due to the incident. Indrajit, Balaram Babu, and their younger brother, Arjun, maintain informal control over the area. Arun Roy's father, Bhabani Roy, was a police constable who was also suspended from his job for exposing Balaram. Arun Roy fell in love with a college student named Trisha, whose father was a journalist. To take revenge for his father's insult, Arun made a plan with his friend Hitler to stage Balaram as a madman. They were successful, and Balaram was suspended. A new Superintendent of Police, Sukhamoy Sen, took charge and supported Arun. Indrajit, Arjun, and Balaram tried several times to stop Arun from preventing their different illegal business and failed due to support from the state ministry. Arun later arrested the two of them for different crimes and finally eliminated Balaram after he kidnapped his sister and niece.

== Cast ==
- Prosenjit Chatterjee as Arun Roy (Police officer), later CI
- Swastika Mukherjee as Trisha, Arun's girlfriend
- Ashish Vidyarthi as Balaram Ghosh, Indrajit's elder brother (corrupt Police officer/SP)
- Subhasish Mukherjee as Hitler, Arun's friend
- Bodhisattwa Majumdar as Bhabani Roy, Arun's father
- Sudip Mukherjee as Indrajit Ghosh, Balaram's younger brother (a political leader)
- Tapas Paul as Sukhamoy Sen, Arun's senior officer
- Shankar Chakraborty as Arjun Ghosh, Balaram's youngest brother
- Locket Chatterjee as Sonali, Arun's sister
- Sumit Gangopadhyay as Bablu, a hired terrorist
- Arpita Baker as a corrupt politician

== Soundtrack ==
Greptar

Soundtrack album by Anupam Dutta
- Genre: Feature film soundtrack
- Length: 20:06
- Label: Eskay Music

Official audio
- Greptar - Full Album on YouTube

The music of the film has been composed by Anupam Dutta.

| No. | Title | Singer(s) | Length |
|---|---|---|---|
| 1. | "E Moner Asha Balobasha (Male)" | Abhijeet Bhattacharya | 5:21 |
| 2. | "E Moner Asha Bhalobasha (Duet)" | Abhijeet Bhattacharya, Shreya Ghoshal | 5:33 |
| 3. | "Lal Apple" | Jojo | 4:07 |
| 4. | "Vande Mataram" | Shaan | 5:05 |
| Total length: | | | 20:06 |
