= Chand Keno Aase Na =

2003 song by Raghab Chatterjee

Single by Raghab Chatterjee

from the album Naktala Udayan Sangha
- Language: Bengali
- English title: Why doesn't the moon come (to my home)
- Released: May 1, 2003
- Length: 6:02
- Label: Saregama
- Composer: Chiradeep Dasgupta
- Lyricist: Sumit Samaddar

Raghab Chatterjee singles chronology
"Joy Maa Durga" (2003)	"Chand Keno Aase Na" (2003)	"Uri Uri Mon" (2003)

Chand Keno Aase Na is a Bengali-language song by Raghab Chatterjee, written by Sumit Samaddar and composed by Chiradeep Dasgupta. It was released in 2003 to two different albums by Chatterjee, Naktala Udayan Sangha and Amar Akash. Chand Keno Aase Na is a sad-themed song talking about the moon.

== Raghab Chatterjee on the song ==
Raghab Chatterjee expressed that singing the song gave him a different identity. Around January 2, 2026 he posted a video on social media highlighting a sanitation worker named Ram singing the song while doing his work. Chatterjee stated he was impressed on hearing Ram singing the song.

Chatterjee frequently sang the song while in his twenties and after graduating from college. On August 23, 2023, he commented about the song when the Chandrayaan-3 lunar lander landed on the moon, "The moon won't come, so we left." In regard of Chand Keno Aase Na and the moon landing, he commented "I was thinking about this since yesterday. There was an interesting poetic imagination in the song. My song was also a superhit. And today we are about to reach the moon."

On April 14, 2018, Chatterjee sung the song in the stadium of Calcutta Cricket and Football Club (CC&FC) on the show Shubho Poila Baishakh, in association with The Telegraph (India), along with other songs like Behag jodi na hoy, Banshi shune ar kaj nai and Allah ke bande.
