= Pitribhumi =

2007 Bengali film

Pitribhumi is a Bengali drama film directed by Prabhat Roy based on 1963 same name novel of Bengali author Prafulla Roy. This is the debut film of Bengali superstar Subhasree Ganguly. This film was released in 2007 under the banner of Rose Valley Film.

== Plot ==
A young NRI Jayanta comes to India to save his ancestral house from powerful promoters.

== Cast ==
- Jeet as Jayanta Dutta
- Dipankar De
- Swastika Mukherjee
- Subhasree Ganguly Jayanta's sister
- Lily Chakravarty
- Shakuntala Barua
- Nayna Bandyopadhyay
- Arindam Sil
- Tanima Sen
- Moumita Gupta
- Sanjib Dasgupta
