= Purushottam (film) =

1992 Bengali action film

- Directed by: Prosenjit Chatterjee
- Written by: Prosenjit Chatterjee; Asit Basu
- Screenplay by: Asit Basu
- Story by: Prosenjit Chatterjee; Sachin Bhowmik; Pinku Das
- Produced by: Prosenjit Chatterjee; Bijay Pashi
- Starring: Prosenjit Chatterjee; Debashree Roy
- Cinematography: V. Prabhakar
- Edited by: Joy Banerjee; Babul Bakshy
- Music by: R. D. Burman
- Production company: Prosenjit Films
- Distributed by: Amen Movies Pvt Ltd.
- Release date: 6 November 1992
- Country: India
- Language: Bengali

Purushottam (Bengali pronunciation: [puɾuʃɔttɔm]; transl. The best among men) is a 1992 Indian Bengali-language epic gangster action film co-produced, co-written and directed by Prosenjit Chatterjee in his directorial debut, under the banner of Prosenjit Films. It stars Chatterjee himself in the titular role, alongside an ensemble cast of Debashree Roy, Abhishek Chatterjee, Jagannath Guha, Subhendu Chatterjee, Dipankar De, Uttam Mohanty and Hara Patnaik in another pivotal roles. It follows Badshah, a Kolkata-based outlaw, being hired to capture a ruthless gangster named Maalik, by a widow who was actually the former's girlfriend in the past.

From a story by Sachin Bhowmik, Chatterjee and Asit Basu penned its screenplay in 1990. R. D. Burman composed the soundtrack and score, while V. Prabhakar was its cinematographer. Joy Banerjee and Babul Bakshy edited the film. It was extensively shot across West Bengal and Odisha, with additional locations including Mumbai and Chennai.

Purushottam was theatrically released on 6 November 1992, coinciding with Kali Puja, to critical acclaim, primarily for its technology and sound design. The film became the highest-grossing Bengali film during its theatrical run.

Purushottam attained a cult status and was considered as one of the theamitically-groundbreaking films in Bengali cinema. It was credited with the introduction of steadicam and new sound recording techniques in Bengali cinema, encouraging filmmakers to explore a variety of themes and make experimental films. In 1995, it served as an inspiration for the Hindi film Ram Jaane.

== Plot ==
Baadshah/Dipak has completed B.A. exam and he wants to work. He does not continue his education. But his father wants to continue his studies. Friends of Dipak want him to stand in election. Dipak's opponent party Sunil is trying to stop Dipak to stand in the election, they threat Dipak. They tease Namita, love of Dipak and Dipak protest. it Sunil is the son of M.L.A. thats why the principal of the college rusticates him. Sunil and his gang attack Dipak's father and kill him. Namita leaves Dipak and marries Alok. Alok is a police officer in Orrisa. Malik, an underworld don kills Alok. Baadshah kills Sunil and the M.L.A. and after that Baadshah comes to know about Malik. He goes there and comes to know about what happened with Namita. Dipak/Baadshah determines to finish Malik and his gang. Baadshah hits Malik's people very badly. Malik kills a friend of Baadshah. Baadshah is angry and determines to kill Malik. Baadshah and his friend finishes total gang of Malik. Malik shoots Baadshah and his friends finishes total gang of Malik. Malik shoots a bullet at Namita and Namita kills Malik. Namita also dies.

== Cast ==
- Prosenjit Chatterjee as Deepak / Badshah
- Debashree Roy as Namita
- Shubhendu Chatterjee as ACP Sinha
- Kali Banerjee as Deepak's adoptive uncle
- Dipankar De
- Abhishek Chatterjee as Deepak's assistant
- Pallavi Chatterjee
- Pradip Mukherjee
- Uttam Mohanty
- Hara Patnaik

== Soundtrack ==
Purushottam

Soundtrack album by R. D. Burman
- Released: 1992
- Genre: Feature film soundtrack
- Language: Bengali

Lyrics:- Sachin Bhowmik

=== Tracks ===
Song	Singer
"Dite Pari E Jibon"	R. D. Burman
"Tumi Ele Anupama"	Asha Bhosle, Saikat Mitra
"Ki Laabh Hobe Kore Ei Chitkar"	Asha Bhosle, Jolly Mukherjee
"Ek Dake Oi"	Jhumki Roy, Jolly Mukherjee
"Aaj Andhakar Jatoi Hok Dur Habe"	Asha Bhosle
"Aay Aay Ghum Aay"	Kumar Sanu
