= Amar Sangee =

1987 Bengali romantic drama film by Sujit Guha

- Video cover
- Directed by: Sujit Guha
- Screenplay by: Anjan Choudhury
- Dialogues by: Anjan Choudhury
- Story by: Dipti Pal
- Produced by: Dipti Pal
- Starring: Prosenjit Chatterjee; Vijayeta Pandit; Subhendu Chatterjee; Rabi Ghosh; Ruma Guha Thakurata; Shakuntala Barua
- Cinematography: Bijoy Dey
- Edited by: Baidyanath Chatterjee
- Music by: Bappi Lahiri
- Production company: Dipti Pal Productions
- Distributed by: Dipti Enterprise
- Release date: 25 September 1987
- Country: India
- Language: Bengali

Amar Sangee (lit. 'Immortal companion') is a 1987 Indian Bengali-language romantic drama film directed by Sujit Guha. Produced by Dipti Pal under her banner of Dipti Pal Productions, the screenplay and dialogues of the film were written by Anjan Choudhury, which itself was based on a story by Pal herself. It stars Prosenjit Chatterjee and Vijayeta Pandit in the lead roles, while Subhendu Chatterjee, Rabi Ghosh, Ruma Guha Thakurta, Shakuntala Barua and Soumitra Banerjee play supporting roles. The music of the film was composed by Bappi Lahiri.

The film became a major blockbuster and became the turning point in Prosenjit's career, emerging as his first major hit and it established him as a major commercial cinema actor. It ran in the theatres for more than 75 weeks and was widely appreciated by the audience.

== Plot ==
Sagar is a young man whose father, Indranil, is a prominent businessman. Sagar goes off to pursue his education and after he returns home he meets Jhilik, a pretty young woman who was his childhood friend. They meet and they fall in love. When Sagar's father finds out about their relationship he refuses to accept it because Jhilik is the daughter of Anuradha, their maid. Indranil wants his son to marry his friend's daughter Tumpa instead. Tumpa's brother Suvankar also wants his sister to marry Sagar as he has designs on the properties of Indranil & Sagar. When all his plans fail, Suvankar attempts to kill Indranil by sabotaging his car. In the meantime, Sagar finds out about this and saves his father. Later Suvankar is handed over to the police for his crime. Eventually Indranil realizes his mistakes and relents to have Jhilik as his daughter-in-law. In the end Jhilik and Sagar are re-united.

== Cast ==
- Prosenjit Chatterjee as Sagar
- Vijayeta Pandit as Jhilik
- Subhendu Chatterjee as Indranil
- Ruma Guha Thakurta as Anuradha
- Shakuntala Barua as Sagar's Mother
- Rabi Ghosh
- Haradhan Banerjee
- Ishani Banerjee as Tumpa
- Soumitra Banerjee as Shubhankar

== Soundtrack ==
Amar Sangee

Soundtrack album by Bappi Lahiri
- Released: 23 September 1987
- Recorded: 1987
- Genre: Feature film soundtrack
- Length: 37:45
- Language: Bengali
- Label: Venus
- Director: Sujit Guha
- Producer: Dipti Pal

Bappi Lahiri chronology
Guru Dakshina (1987)	Amar Sangee (1987)	Commando (1988)

The music of the film has been composed by Bappi Lahiri. The lyrics have been penned by Pulak Bandyopadhyay. The song "Chirodini Tumi Je Amar" became a runaway hit and is considered as one of the evergreen Bengali classics.

No.	Title	Singer(s)	Length
1.	"Chirodini Tumi Je Amar (Male)"	Kishore Kumar	7:10
2.	"Chirodini Tumi Je Amar (Female)"	Asha Bhosle	7:09
3.	"Ami Mon Diyechhi"	Asha Bhosle	5:19
4.	"Amar Ichchhe Korchhe"	Asha Bhosle; Bappi Lahiri	6:23
5.	"Monta Amar Hariye Gechhe"	Vijayta Pandit	4:39
6.	"Jekhanei Thako Shukhe Theko"	Asha Bhosle	5:13
Total length:			37:53

== Awards ==
Year	Nominee / work	Award	Result
1988	Asha Bhosle	BFJA Awards For Best Playback Singer (Female)	Won
