= Adarer Bon =

1997 film directed by Swapan Saha

- Directed by: Swapan Saha
- Starring: Prosenjit Chatterjee; Biplab Chatterjee; Rituparna Sengupta; Abhishek Chatterjee; Anju Ghosh; Subhendu Chatterjee
- Edited by: Ujjal Nandi
- Music by: Anupam Dutta
- Production company: Lakshmikusum - Haranath Production Pvt Ltd.
- Release date: 1997
- Country: India
- Language: Bengali

Adarer Bon (transl. Dear sister) is a 1997 Bengali drama film directed by Swapan Saha. The film's music was composed by Anupam Dutta.The film stars Prosenjit Chatterjee and Rituparna Sengupta in the lead roles.

== Cast ==
- Prosenjit Chatterjee
- Biplab Chatterjee
- Rituparna Sengupta
- Abhishek Chatterjee
- Anju Ghosh
- Subhendu Chatterjee

== Awards ==
BFJA Awards (1997):-

- Best Editing-Ujjal Nandi
