= Inder Sen =

- Born: India
- Occupations: Film director, producer and screenwriter
- Years active: 1969-2004

Inder Sen is an Indian film director, producer and screenwriter working in Bengali cinema. He has directed several films since the 1960s, making his directorial debut in the film Pratham Kadam Phool, which was written based on the story of the same name, by Achintya Kumar Sengupta.

In 1995 Sen received Bengal Film Journalists' Association Award in the Best Indian Film category for the film Tumi Je Aamar was released in 1994.

== Filmography ==
- Pratham Kadam Phool (1969)
- Picnic (1972)
- Arjun (1975)
- Asamay (1976)
- Sampark (1979)
- Chamelee Memsaab (1978)
- Bondi Balaka (1981)
- Pipasa (1982)
- Mon Mane Na (1992)
- Thikana (1991)
- Tumi Je Aamar (1994)
