= Maaltake Garite Tol =

Film quote and viral internet meme

- A meme template generated from the quote
- Actor: Soumitra Bannerjee
- Written by: Anjan Choudhury
- First used in: Nawab

Maaltake Garite Tol (Bengali: মালটাকে গাড়িতে তোল, lit. 'Take the hottie in the car') is a quote from the 1991 Bengali-language Indian film Nawab spoken by a character played by Soumitra Bannerjee. The line has gained popularity as an expression of irony.

== Origin ==
The dialogue is from a scene in the 1991 Indian Bengali-language film Nawab. In that scene, the heroine of the film continues to walk on the road. After seeing the heroine on the street, Soumitra orders the girl to be forcibly brought in his car. His order became the quote.

== Other usage ==
The creation of memes using the dialogue from Bangladesh started on 3 September 2022 and after that the meme became viral. A meme brought the quote to the heart of online discussions. It was about freedom of speech was first shared online by an anonymous person using the quote. Then various memes were created using the quote and a photo of Soumitra, including a meme about Aboriginal Australians and missionaries, a meme about street animals, ragging culture in universities, mugging incidents in Mohammadpur, etc. Bangladeshi biryani chain Sultan's Dine published an advertisement on their Facebook page using Soumitra's photo and the quote. In the advertisement, Soumitra is seen desiring to put potatoes on his plate after seeing potatoes in Sultan's Dine's Kachchi Biryani dish. The advertisement became popular after it went viral.
