= Bhai Amar Bhai =

- Theatrical release poster
- Directed by: Swapan Saha
- Story by: Swapan Saha
- Produced by: Shree Venkatesh Films
- Starring: Prosenjit Chatterjee; Anushree Das; Abhishek Chatterjee; Chiranjit Chakraborty; Rozina
- Music by: Anupam Dutta
- Release date: 1996
- Country: India
- Language: Bengali
- Budget: 65 lakhs

Bhai Amar Bhai (transl. Brother, my brother) is a 1996 Bengali-language action film written & directed by Swapan Saha and produced by Shree Venkatesh Films. The film features actors Prosenjit Chatterjee, Chiranjit Chakraborty, Abhishek Chatterjee, Anushree Das, Subhendu Chatterjee and Rozina in the lead roles. The music of the film was composed by Anupam Dutta. It was said to be the first Bengali film to make ₹1 crore at the box office.

== Plot ==
Sanjay, Mala and Amar are siblings who live in a village with their father, Master. Mala's marriage was fixed with Arun. Sashi Shekhar, the wicked zamindar always tried to use force upon the villagers. Once Master slaps Sashi in front of the entire village, after which Sashi promises to take revenge. One night Sashi, with some goons attacks Master's house, murders him and sets the house on fire. Luckily the three children escape. While the children were escaping on train, Amar gets separated from the other two. Kajal, a nurse, finds Mala and Sanjay and takes care of them, while Amar is adopted by a drunk garage mechanic, Mantu who renames Amar as Raja. When they grow up Mala becomes a nurse, while Raja becomes a mechanic. Once Raja also saves Mala from some goons, but the two don't recognise each other. Sanjay falls in love with Mita, Sashi Shekhar's daughter, while Mala is in love with Arun, not knowing that the two were indeed supposed to get married. Sashi Shekhar once again plots to separate Sanjay from Mala by trying to bring Sanjay under his influence and is successful in creating a rift between brother and sister. But in the process, Mala and Raja recognize Sashi babu and in turn their own relation. Ultimately Amar Mala, Sanjay and Arun fight jointly to overpower Sashi babu.

== Production ==
Bhai Amar Bhai is the first Shree Venkatesh Films Production.

== Cast ==
- Prosenjit Chatterjee as Amar/Raja
- Anushree Das
- Abhishek Chatterjee as Sanjay
- Chiranjit Chakraborty as Arun
- Rozina as Mala
- Subhendu Chatterjee
- Rabi Ghosh
- Soma Dey
- Anamika Saha
