= Badnam =

- Directed by: Shibu Mitra
- Written by: Vinod Rattan
- Screenplay by: Tapendu Gangopadhyay
- Story by: Vinod Rattan
- Produced by: Ms. Rupanjali
- Starring: Prosenjit Chatterjee; Neelam Kothari; Shakti Kapoor; Shubhendu Chatterjee; Sunny Deol (guest Appearance)
- Music by: Bappi Lahiri
- Release date: 25 May 1990
- Country: India
- Language: Bengali

Badnam (English: Infamous) is a 1990 Bengali action drama film directed by Shibu Mitra and produced by Ms. Rupanjali. The film stars Prosenjit Chatterjee and Neelam Kothari in the lead roles, with Sunny Deol in a guest appearance. Music of the film has been composed by Bappi Lahiri.

== Plot ==
Poor and honest man Haranath was entrapped by a corrupt person Mathur Ghosh. He commits suicide. Shankar, Haranath's son oaths to avenge for the wrongs done to Haranath. When he grows up, he also gets entrapped by Mathur Ghosh's friend and co-partner Sundar Banerjee who's also the local police head, Manotosh Banerjee's son even to the point he loses his lover Priya Dutta to him, the rich Prakash Dutta's daughter who also wanted to prove Haranath's innocence. But he does not let evil defeat him like his father while he avenges his death. He arrests Sundar and makes him confess in front of his father, that he got Mathur to entrap Haranath as a thief, took Priya away from him after framing him for using heroin in Priya's hotel where he was a singer and killing Mathur's daughter. Manotosh gets him and Mathur arrested in front of him and his mom while proving Haranath's innocence. Shankar and Priya finally get married.

== Cast ==
- Prosenjit Chatterjee as Shankar
- Neelam Kothari as Priya Dutta
- Shakti Kapoor as Keshto
- Shubhendu Chatterjee as Inspector Manotosh Banerjee
- Shakuntala Barua as Shankar's Mother
- Pallavi Chatterjee as Radha
- Soumitra Bannerjee as Sundar Banerjee
- Bankim Ghosh as Mathur Ghosh
- Tapendu Gangopadhyay as Prakash Dutta
- Ramen Roy Chowdhury as Haranath
- Sunny Deol (guest Appearance) as Darshan

== Soundtrack ==
All songs were composed by Bappi Lahiri and the lyrics were written by Pulak Bandopadhyay.

Song	Singer
"Jhal Legeche Amar"	Alka Yagnik
"Makhan Churi"-1	Anuradha Paudwal
"Makhan Churi"-2	Anuradha Paudwal
"Priya Priya Priya, Tumi Je Amar Priya"	Amit Kumar, Sapna Mukherjee
"Chokhe Chokhe Chokhe Chokhe Kotha Holo"	Asha Bhosle, Kumar Sanu
"Kaje Kiser Laaj"	Bappi Lahiri
