= Kolkatay Kohinoor =

2019 Indian Bengali-language film

- Directed by: Santanu Ghosh
- Release date: 15 March 2019 (Kolkata)
- Country: India
- Language: Bengali

Kolkatay Kohinoor (2019, English: Kohinoor in Kolkata) is an Indian Bengali thriller movie directed by Santanu Ghosh and produced by Angurbala Films It was released on 15 March 2019.

== Plot ==
There is some mystery and new historical facts behind the famous Koh-i-Noor diamond. Historians research whether it had any connection with Kolkata. A treasure hunt reveals several unknown facts.

== Cast ==
- Soumitra Chatterjee
- Sabyasachi Chakraborty
- Indrani Dutta
- Barun Chanda
- Debdut Ghosh
- Anup pan
- Ankita Majumder
- Mona Dutta
