= Sabar Upare Maa =

1997 film

- Directed by: Swapan Saha
- Produced by: Swapan Kumar Saha Shrikant Mohta
- Starring: Chiranjeet Chakraborty; Abhishek Chatterjee; Subhendu Chatterjee; Subhasish Mukhopadhyay; Nirmal Kumar; Anamika Saha; Rozina; Biplab Chatterjee
- Music by: Anupam Dutta; Ashok Bhadra
- Production company: Shree Venkatesh Films Swapan Pictures
- Distributed by: Shree Venkatesh Films
- Release date: 4 April 1997
- Country: India
- Language: Bengali

Sabar Upare Maa (Bengali: সবার উপরে মা) is a 1997 Bengali drama film directed by Swapan Saha. The film's music was composed by Anupam Dutta, Debojyoti Mishra and Ashok Bhadra.

== Cast ==
- Chiranjeet Chakraborty
- Abhishek Chatterjee
- Subhendu Chatterjee
- Subhasish Mukhopadhyay
- Anamika Saha
- Rozina
- Biplab Chatterjee
- Aditi Chatterjee
