= Amar Prem (1989 film) =

- Theatrical release poster
- Directed by: Sujit Guha
- Produced by: Sandip Films Pvt. Ltd.
- Starring: Prosenjit Chatterjee; Juhi Chawla; Haradhan Bandopadhyay
- Music by: Bappi Lahiri
- Distributed by: Angel Digital
- Release date: 1989
- Country: India
- Language: Bengali

Amar Prem (Note: It is pronounced as 'Omor Prem') (lit. 'Immortal love') is a 1989 Bengali film directed by Sujit Guha and produced under the banner of Sandip Films Pvt. Ltd. The film features actors Prosenjit Chatterjee and Juhi Chawla in the lead roles. Music of the film has been composed by Bappi Lahiri. It became a box office success and emerged as a blockbuster at the end of its theatrical run.

== Plot ==
Deepika Bose and Subho Chowdhury, who are in love, struggle to unite as Deepika's rich arrogant father Prabir Bose disapproves of Subho even if their mothers promised each other to get them married. Meanwhile, her father betroths her to an evil man, Niladri who is only interested in their family's property. Niladri also frames Subho for her friend Supriya's murder for which Deepika breaks up with him. But he is found not guilty due to lack of evidence and returns home to his regretful mother, Latika, who burnt her hand in their house temple for slapping him when the police arrested him. He reunites with Deepika but her father still forbids them. He also gets his younger sister Dishna married to her lover Pulak after he finally convinces his father Animesh he wants to marry her. When he goes to Deepika's house again to elope with her, she refuses which heartbreaks him. Despite the fact that Deepika wants to reunite with him after realizing her mistake, he still feels betrayed and she agrees to marry Niladri. But everything gets resolved in the end when Niladri gets arrested for the murder on her wedding day and they reunite and get married with his mother and her father's blessings.

== Cast ==
- Prosenjit Chatterjee as Shubho Chowdhury
- Juhi Chawla as Deepika Bose (voice dubbed in Bengali by Anamika Saha)
- Haradhan Bandopadhyay as Prabir Bose
- Shakuntala Barua as Latika
- Pallavi Chatterjee as Supriya
- Soumitra Bannerjee as Niladri
