= Chena Achena (1999 film) =

1999 Bengali film

- Directed by: Subhas Sen
- Starring: Abhishek Chatterjee; Rituparna Sengupta; Victor Banerjee; Biplab Chatterjee; Subhendu Chatterjee; Subhasish Mukhopadhyay
- Music by: Anupam Dutta
- Release date: 1999
- Country: India
- Language: Bengali

Chena Achena (transl. known strangers) is a 1999 Bengali drama film directed by Subhas Sen and produced by Sukumar Bhadra. The film's music was composed by Anupam Dutta.

== Cast ==
- Biplab Chatterjee
- Abhishek Chatterjee
- Rituparna Sengupta
- Victor Banerjee
- Subhendu Chatterjee

== Soundtrack ==
- "Jake Ei Mon Chay" – Kavita Krishnamurthy
- "Choi Choi Choi Tipi Tipi" – Monali Thakur (first song of her career)
- "Ekti Shalik Dekhini Toh" – Sonu Nigam, Sadhana Sargam
- "Tumi Ele Mone Holo" – Alka Yagnik, Abhijeet Bhattacharya
- "Janina Mon, Ki Je Karon" – Alka Yagnik
