= Sanjibani =

1952 film

- Directed by: Sukumar Dasgupta
- Written by: Pratima Devi
- Starring: Uttam Kumar; Reba Devi; Dhiraj Das; Gurudas Bandyopadhyay; Jahar Ganguly; Sandhyarani
- Music by: Anupam Ghatak
- Release date: 8 February 1952
- Language: Bengali

Sanjibani is a Bengali drama film directed by Sukumar Dasgupta. This movie was released under the banner of M. P. Productions Pvt. Ltd. The film narrates the journey of a young aspiring writer. It stars Uttam Kumar, Reba Devi, Jahar Ganguly, Jiben Bose and Sandhyarani. Both Sandhyarani and Uttam Kumar won critical favour for their performance in the film.

== Cast ==
- Uttam Kumar as Ravi
- Reba Devi
- Sandhyarani
- Gurudas Bandyopadhyay
- Jahar Ganguly
- Jiben Bose
- Kanu Banerjee
- Padma Devi
- Probha Debi
- Dhiraj Das
