= Mittir Barir Chhoto Bou =

- Directed by: Sushil Mukhopadhyay
- Starring: Abhishek Chatterjee; Anil Chatterjee; Supriya Choudhury; Debraj Roy; Nirmal Kumar; Indrani Dutta; Kaushik Banerjee; Sanghamitra Bandyopadhyay; Tapas Paul
- Music by: Anupam Dutta
- Production company: G. P. Films
- Release date: 1997
- Country: India
- Language: Bengali

Mittir Barir Chhoto Bou (Bengali: মিত্তির বাড়ীর ছোট বউ) is a 1997 Bengali drama film directed by Sushil Mukhopadhyay. The film stars Abhishek Chatterjee, Indrani Dutta, Tapas Paul in lead roles. The film has its music composed by Anupam Dutta.

== Cast ==
- Tapas Paul as Arindam Bose
- Indrani Dutta as Anindita Mitra
- Abhishek Chatterjee as Subhendu Mitra
- Aditi Chatterjee
- Anil Chatterjee as Anil
- Mita Chatterjee as Maternal Aunt of Anindita
- Supriya Choudhury as Subhendu's mother
- Debraj Roy as Bhushan Mitra
- Nirmal Kumar as Maternal Uncle of Anindita
- Anuradha Ray as Ritu Mitra
- Sanghamitra Bandyopadhyay as Kankona Mitra
- Kaushik Banerjee as Joydeb Mitra

== Soundtrack ==
Music of this film is composed by Anupam Dutta and the lyrics have been penned by Pulak Bandyopadhyay and Tapas Dutta, Kumar Sanu, Alka Yagnik, Sonu Nigam, and Asha Bhosle gave their voices for the songs.

=== Track listings ===
- 01. Swapno Amar Shoti Hoye Jaye by Sonu Nigam & Alka Yagnik
- 02. Jokhoni Je Dike Jayee by Kumar Sanu & Alka Yagnik
- 03. Mone Pore Ki Ki Tumi Chile by Kumar Sanu
- 04. Mon Je Aamar Mayur Holo by Asha Bhosle
- 05. Phire Elam Ami Sei Banglaye by Kumar Sanu
