= Chaowa Pawa (2009 film) =

- Poster of Chaowa Pawa
- Directed by: Swapan Saha
- Written by: N. K. Salil
- Produced by: Nemai Panja
- Starring: Prosenjit; Rachna Banerjee; Abhishek Chatterjee; Locket Chatterjee
- Cinematography: Rana Dasgupta
- Edited by: Suresh Urs
- Music by: Ashok Bhadra
- Distributed by: Khudiram Chakraborty
- Release date: 30 January 2009
- Running time: 120 minutes
- Country: India
- Language: Bengali

Chaowa Pawa (Bengali: চাওয়া পাওয়া, English: To Want and to Receive) is a 2009 Bengali romantic thriller film directed by Swapan Saha. The film stars Prosenjit, Rachna Banerjee, Swarna Kamal Dutta, Santana Bose, Bodhisattwa Majumdar, Abhishek Chatterjee, Ramen Roy Chowdhury, and Locket Chatterjee.

== Plot ==
Debdutta and Arun are inseparable childhood peers who maintain an excellent bonhomie as adults. While Arun becomes a cop, Deb joins a refrigerator company as a senior executive. Meanwhile, Deb falls in love with Kabita. While Deb and Kabita plan to marry, Kabita recommends her closest friend's name (Kajol) as a partner for Arun. Debdutta goes to Arun and lays out the plan and the duo hope to marry together, in the same day. But things go awry when Arun hurts himself while defusing a car bomb. He burns so badly that doctors abandon all hope. Succumbing to injuries, a dying Arun requests Deb to bring Kajol for a final instance. Deb goes to fetch Kajol, but her uncle Binod bashes up Deb because he has diverse plans of marrying Kajol to a Dubaian tycoon. Deb gets back to the hospital unscathed, shivering in despair. Meanwhile, Kabita arrives at the venue. Deb requests and prays Kabita to act as Kajol only for a solitary instance, as the last wish of a dying man (Arun had never seen Kajol). But after experiencing Kabita as Kajol, Arun miraculously returns to life from the jaws of death. Kabita gets tragically stamped as Kajol and Deb sacrifices his love for the sake of his peer. Deb searches out Kajol, but she gets stabbed to death by Binod. Abandoning all hope Deb advises Kabita to marry Arun and remain Kajol for her forthcoming life. A dumbstruck Kabita prepares to sacrifice everything. But on the day of marriage Arun reveals that he knows every move of the sacrificing couple and ultimately the estranged and tested lovers re-unite.

== Cast ==
- Prosenjit as Debdutta
- Rachna Banerjee as Kabita
- Locket Chatterjee as Kajol
- Abhishek Chatterjee as Arun
- Swarna Kamal Dutta
- Santana Bose
- Bodhisattwa Majumdar
- YourPritam
- Ramen Roy Chowdhury

== Music ==
1. "Bondhu Aaj Theke" - Zubeen Garg & Abhijeet
2. "Aaj Mon Chai Sey Chawate"
3. "Tumi Aachho Moner Ghare"
4. "Shudhu Cheye Dekhona" (Duet)
5. "Shudhu Cheye Dekhona" (Female)
6. "Shudhu Cheye Dekhona" (Male)
