= Swamir Aadesh =

1998 film

- Directed by: Swapan Saha
- Starring: Prosenjit Chatterjee; Abhishek Chatterjee; Biplab Chatterjee; Satabdi Roy; Mrinal Mukherjee; Anushree Das; Gita Karmakar
- Music by: Anupam Dutta
- Release date: 1998
- Country: India
- Language: Bengali

Swamir Aadesh (transl. Husband's order) is a 1998 Bengali drama film directed by Swapan Saha. The film's music is composed by Anupam Dutta.

== Cast ==
- Prosenjit Chatterjee
- Abhishek Chatterjee
- Biplab Chatterjee
- Satabdi Roy
- Anushree Das
- Mrinal Mukherjee

== Soundtrack ==
- "Amar Ei Monete" – Kumar Sanu, Alka Yagnik
- "Chaina Toh Beshi Kichhu" – Kumar Sanu, Sasha Ghoshal
- "Chokhe Chokhe Rakhi" – Kumar Sanu, Sasha Ghoshal
- "Uthuk Jotoi Jhor" – Kumar Sanu
- "Amar Ei Gaan" – Sasha Ghoshal
