= Apan Por =

- Directed by: Tapan Saha
- Produced by: Joytara Pictures
- Starring: Prosenjit Chatterjee; Juhi Chawla; Uttam Mohanty; Anuradha Ray
- Music by: Bappi Lahiri
- Release date: 14 February 1992
- Country: India
- Language: Bengali
- Budget: ₹ 55 Lakhs
- Box office: ₹ 96 Lakhs

Apan Por is a 1992 Bengali Drama Film directed by Tapan Saha and produced by Joytara Pictures under the banner of Joytara Pictures. It features Prosenjit Chatterjee and Juhi Chawla in the lead roles. The music has been composed by Bappi Lahiri. The film's soundtrack has a superhit song Aamar Garbo Shudhu Ei, sung by Asha Bhosle.

== Cast ==
- Prosenjit Chatterjee as Gora
- Juhi Chawla as Swapna
- Shubhendu Chatterjee as Doctor
- Sumitra Mukherjee as Swapna's Aunty
- Anuradha Ray as Buli
- Uttam Mohanty as Alok Mukherjee
- Kaushik Banerjee as Amiyo
- Dolon Roy
- Pallavi Chatterjee
- Mrinal Mukherjee as Doctor
- Tito Bandyopadhyay
- Basanta Chowdhury as Pratap Chandra

== Songs ==
- "Aamar Garbo Shudhu Ei" –

Asha Bhosle

- "Shaak Diye Ki Maach Dhaka Jai" –

Amit Kumar

- "Keno Sobai Bujhlo Shudhu Bhool" –

Bappi Lahiri

- "Aamra Natun Juti" -

Kumar Sanu, Anuradha Paudwal

- "Chokhe Chokhe Je Kotha Hoyechhe" -

Kumar Sanu, Kavita Krishnamurthy
