= Rajar Raja =

Indian Bengali film starring Prosenjit Chatterjee

- Directed by: Shamit Bhanja
- Produced by: Shila Bhanja
- Starring: Debashree Roy; Prosenjit Chatterjee; Abhishek Chatterjee; Roopa Ganguly
- Cinematography: Deepak Das; Santu Roy
- Edited by: Rajasekhar Bosu
- Release date: 1994
- Country: India
- Language: Bengali

Rajar Raja is a 1994 Indian Bengali film directed by Shamit Bhanja. The film stars Prosenjit, Debashree Roy, Abhishek Chatterjee and Rupa Ganguly in the lead roles.

== Cast ==
- Prosenjit
- Debashree Roy
- Abhishek Chatterjee
- Roopa Ganguly
- Haradhan Bandopadhyay
- Koushik Bandyopadhyay
- Debnath Chattopadhyay
- Rahul Barman
