= Asha O Bhalobasha =

- Directed by: Sujit Guha
- Based on: Asha O Bhalobasha by Shaktipada Rajguru
- Screenplay by: Shaktipada Rajguru; Tapendu Ganguly
- Dialogues by: Tapendu Gangopadhyay; Sujit Guha
- Story by: Shaktipada Rajguru
- Produced by: Parul Dutta
- Starring: Prosenjit Chatterjee; Deepika Chikhalia; Utpal Dutt; Samit Bhanja
- Cinematography: Bijoy Dey
- Edited by: Swapan Guha
- Music by: Bappi Lahiri
- Production company: Mamani Films
- Distributed by: Mana Films Distributors
- Release date: 3 February 1989
- Running time: 176 minutes
- Country: India
- Language: Bengali

Asha O Bhalobasha (transl. Hope and Love) is a 1989 Indian Bengali-language vigilante Western film directed by Sujit Guha. Produced by Mamani Films, the film was based on a story by Shaktipada Rajguru. The film stars Prosenjit Chatterjee, Deepika Chikhlia in lead roles, other cast includes Poonam Dasgupta, Subhendu Chatterjee, Ruma Guha Thakurta, Utpal Dutt, Samit Bhanja play another pivotal roles. The music of the film was composed by Bappi Lahiri.

== Cast ==
- Prosenjit Chatterjee as Thakur Bijoy Singha
- Deepika Chikhalia as Roopa, a school teacher
- Utpal Dutt as Bilas Dutta
- Poonam Dasgupta as Pakhi
- Subhendu Chatterjee as Bikash Sen
- Ruma Guha Thakurta as Roopa's Mother
- Samit Bhanja as Gopal Sarkar
- Anup Kumar as Gobindo Daroga
- Shakti Thakur as Kanai
- Shakuntala Barua as Bikash Sen's Wife

== Soundtrack ==
Asha O Bhalobasha

Soundtrack album by Bappi Lahiri
- Released: 1 January 1987
- Recorded: 1986
- Studio: Sunny Super Sound, Mumbai; Mehboob Studio, Bandra
- Genre: Feature film soundtrack
- Length: 54:43
- Language: Bengali
- Label: Angel Digital
- Producer: Rabin Chatterjee; Avik Thakur

Song	Singer
"Tumi Amar Asha"	Kishore Kumar
"Natobor Nagor Tumi"	Kishore Kumar
"Paharer Jongole Ek"	Asha Bhosle
"Beshi Ki Boli"	Asha Bhosle, Bappi Lahiri
"O Pahar, O Akash"	Bappi Lahiri
"O Pahar, O Akash"	Kavita Krishnamurthy
"Gopal Re O Gopal"	Anusuya Ghosh
"Ruby Ruby Ruby"	Sharon Prabhakar
