= Kencho Khunrte Keute =

1995 film

- Directed by: Chiranjeet
- Screenplay by: Chiranjeet
- Dialogues by: Chiranjeet
- Story by: Chiranjeet
- Produced by: Chiranjeet
- Starring: Chiranjeet; Indrani Dutta; Utpal Dutt; Satya Bandyopadhyay
- Cinematography: Shankar Guha
- Edited by: Jayanta Laha
- Music by: Anupam Dutta
- Production company: Dipabali Chitram
- Release date: 1995
- Country: India
- Language: Bengali
- Budget: 9 lakhs Rs.

Kencho Khunrte Keute (transl. cobra to dig earthworms) is a 1995 Indian Bengali-language action-comedy film written, directed and produced by Chiranjeet, under the banner of Dipabali Chitram. A modern day adaptation of William Shakespeare's classic play, The Taming of the Shrew, it stars Chiranjeet with Indrani Dutta in the lead roles, while Utpal Dutta, Basanti Chatterjee, Satya Bandyopadhyay, Tanima Majumder and Sumit Ganguly played supporting roles. The film's music was composed by Anupam Dutta with lyrics penned by Laxmikanta Roy. The action and dance sequences were also choreographed by Chiranjeet himself.

Initially, Chiranjeet adapted Kencho Khunrte Keute from the Shakespearean play to perform it as a stage drama. In that drama, Chiranjeet, Utpal Dutta and Sumit Ganguly performed the roles of Ananda, Mr. Roychowdhury and Nepal respectively. Later he planned to make a film on it with Dutta and Ganguly reprising their roles, including him. Made on a budget of 9 lakh Rs, it successfully ran more than 75 weeks, in single screens and was appreciated by the masses.

== Cast ==
- Chiranjeet Chakraborty as Ananda /Hari
- Indrani Dutta
- Utpal Dutt
- Satya Bandyopadhyay
- Basanti Chattopadhyay
- Sumit Ganguly as Nepal Ghosh /Nepo

== Awards ==
BFJA Awards (1996):-

- Best Music:Anupam Dutta
- Best Playback Singer (Male):Kumar Sanu
