= Putrabadhu =

1998 film by Pallab Ghosh

- Video cover of the film
- Directed by: Pallab Ghosh
- Screenplay by: Indrajit Sen
- Story by: Visu
- Starring: Soumitra Chatterjee; Tapas Paul; Debashree Roy; Satabdi Roy; Abhishek Chatterjee; Santu Mukhopadhyay; Arun Banerjee
- Edited by: Swapan Guha
- Music by: Anupam Dutta
- Production company: Damini Pictures Pvt. Ltd.
- Release date: 1998
- Country: India
- Language: Bengali

Putrabadhu (lit. 'Daughter-in-law') (Note: 'Putrabadhu' is a formal Bengali word denoting daughter-in-law.) is a 1998 Bengali film directed by Pallab Ghosh and Chief assistant director was Madhuchhanda Sengupta and produced under the banner of Damini Pictures Pvt. Ltd. The film is a remake of National Award winning 1986 Tamil film Samsaram Adhu Minsaram by Visu.

The film presents the conflict of ego in a father and his descendants. At the same time, it depicts the contemporary conjugal tension of Indian society. Soumitra Chatterjee stars as Haranath Mukherjee, a tenacious father who tells his eldest son to separate when the latter reminds Haranath of his contribution in the family. Tapas Paul and Satabdi Roy star as the brother and sister, Somnath and Monika at odds with the character played by Chatterjee. It also stars Abhishek Chatterjee, Debashree Roy, Santu Mukherjee, Arun Banerjee, Shankar Chakraborty, Mitali Chakraborty and Bela Sarkar. The music of the film was composed by Anupam Dutta with lyrics penned by Lakshmikanta Roy. Due to an ensemble star cast and appeasing storyline, the film was a major success at the box office.

== Plot ==
Haranath Mukherjee is the father of three sons named Somnath, Loknath and Sagar, and a daughter named Monika. Somnath is married to Sita. As Haranath struggles to manage the needs of his joint family with his meagre income, his two elder sons supplement it by contributing to the family kitty.

Loknath and Monika eventually marry Mukta and Joy respectively. Sita, pregnant with her first child, leaves for her father's place. Mukta vows to help Sagar with his studies. This however takes a toll on her married life because of the time devoted on Sagar. She eventually becomes frustrated. This leads her towards a heated argument with Loknath who then, hits her. Mukta leaves for her father's place without informing her in-laws. Haranath rebukes Loknath for his unchecked behaviour with Mukta. Ashamed, Loknath brings her back. Monika returns the same morning to Haranath after a fight with Joy as she prioritizes socialising over domestic responsibilities.

Somnath complains to her mother in giving his share of money to the family, claiming that now his family is going to expand and he might not be able to contribute further. His father casually dismisses it, claiming that Loknath contributes the same amount despite earning less than Somnath. The argument escalates to involve Monika as well. It ends with Haranath asking Somnath to leave his house, upon which Somnath declares that he gave 18000 rupees for Monika's wedding, he wants it back and would happily leave the house. A heartbroken Haranath asks his wife to draw a line between the house, restricting his family to have any contact with Somnath. The rest of the family does not dare defy the decision of the father. To take matters further, Haranath takes voluntary retirement, to collect his funds early, and starts working in double shifts at a shop and as a security guard to pay off the amount asked by Somnath. Sita returns to find the line dividing the house. She teams up with Samser Mashud, a family friend to bring all the family members together.

== Cast ==
- Soumitra Chatterjee as Haranath Mukherjee
- Tapas Paul as Somnath Mukherjee
- Debashree Roy as Sita
- Satabdi Roy as Monika
- Abhishek Chatterjee as Joy Mitra
- Santu Mukherjee as Samser Mashud
- Arun Banerjee as Parimal Mitra
- Ashok Kumar Bhattacharya as Rajeshwar
- Shankar Chakraborty as Loknath Mukherjee
- Mitali Chakraborty as Mukta
- Bela Sarkar as Prabha
