= Bou (name) =

Bou is both a surname and a given name. Notable people with the name include:

Surname:

- Bou (birth name Mohamed Amine Bouguenna, born 1996), Algerian-British musician
- Antoni Bou (born 1987), World Motorcycle Trials Champion
- Bou Meng (1941–2026), Cambodian painter
- Gabrielle Bou Rached (born 1986), former Miss Lebanon
- Gustavo Bou (born 1990), Argentine footballer
- Walter Bou (born 1993), Argentine footballer

Given name:

- Bou Hmara (c. 1860 – 1909), pretender to the throne of Morocco
- Bou Minisuka (born 1983), ex-guitarist An Cafe

Fictional characters:

- Bou Keng Wan, one of the two main characters in the manhua series Fung Wan
- Bou Tin, a supporting character in the manhua series Fung Wan
