= Moner Manush (1997 film) =

- Directed by: Sujit Guha
- Starring: Prosenjit Chatterjee; Rituparna Sengupta; Shakti Kapoor; Aparajita Adhya
- Cinematography: Goutom Basu
- Music by: Dilip Sen-Sameer Sen
- Production company: Sahabadi Films
- Release date: 1997
- Country: India
- Language: Bengali

Moner Manush (English: Ideal Person) is a 1997 romantic action film directed by Sujit Guha featuring Prosenjit Chatterjee and Rituparna Sengupta in the lead roles. It was a box office success.

== Cast ==
- Prosenjit Chatterjee as Rahul
- Rituparna Sengupta as Payel
- Shakti Kapoor as Major
- Shubhendu Chatterjee as Rahul's Father
- Biplab Chatterjee as Aziz
- Dilip Ray as Payel's Father
- Aparajita Auddy as Payel's friend

== Soundtrack ==
| # | Title | Singer(s) | Duration |
|---|---|---|---|
| 1 | Hasle Je Misti Kore | Kumar Sanu; Sadhana Sargam | 3:57 |
| 2 | Moner Manush Fire Pelam | Kumar Sanu; Sadhana Sargam | 5:20 |
| 3 | Tan Tana Tan | Alka Yagnik | 4:27 |
| 4 | Tumi Chara Keu Nei (Female) | Alka Yagnik | 4:16 |
| 5 | Ei Mon Bholate Tomari | Kumar Sanu; Deepa Narayan | 4:29 |
| 6 | Tumi Chara Keu Nei (Male) | Kumar Sanu | 4:43 |
| 7 | Kolkata Kolkata | Kumar Sanu | 3:50 |
