= Swamir Ghar =

1999 film

- Directed by: Swapan Saha
- Starring: Soumitra Chatterjee; Prosenjit Chatterjee; Rituparna Sengupta
- Music by: Anupam Dutta
- Production company: L. G. Films
- Release date: 1999
- Country: India
- Language: Bengali

Swamir Ghar (transl. Husband's house) (Bengali: স্বামীর ঘর) is a 1999 Indian Bengali drama film directed by Swapan Saha. The film has music composed by Anupam Dutta.

== Plot ==
The film revolves around a woman life who hails from a rich family and falls in love with a poor man struggling in life.

== Cast ==
- Soumitra Chatterjee as Asit Roy
- Prosenjit Chatterjee as Ajay
- Rituparna Sengupta as Sangita
- Kaushik Banerjee as Romen
- Bodhisattwa Majumdar as Ajay's guardian
- Nandini Maliya as Sumitra, Asit's wife
- Bhaskar Banerjee as Saagar
- Moyna Mukherjee
