= Bhoy (film) =

1996 Indian Bengali film

- Directed by: Chiranjit Chakraborty
- Starring: Chiranjit Chakraborty; Debashree Roy; Shankar Chakraborty; Soumitra Bannerjee; Dulal Lahiri
- Cinematography: Swapan Nayek
- Edited by: Jayanta Laha
- Music by: Anupam Dutta
- Release date: 1996
- Running time: 87 minutes
- Country: India
- Language: Bengali

Bhoy (transl. fear) is a 1996 Bengali-language psychological thriller film written and directed by Chiranjeet Chakraborty. This movie was released in 1996 in the banner of Dipabali Chitram. This film was loosely based on the English movie Sleeping with the Enemy. Music direction was made by Anupam Dutta and Kabir Suman. The songs of the movie were written by Shibdas Bandyopadhyay and Lakshmikanta Roy.

== Plot ==
Jaya was compelled to marry the ruthless and criminal Ranjit. Ranjit regularly abuses her physically and mentally. She tries to free herself from her husband but cannot succeed. When Jaya discovers that Ranjit and Jagmohan are involved with immoral trafficking and smuggling, she flies to find refuge in reporter Pallab Chatterjee's house. But Jagmohan identifies her residing with Pallab and informs Ranjit. Ranjit plans to sell Jaya to Jagamohan and remarry. One day their henchmen kidnap Jaya, killing her friend Samir. Pallab follows them and after a sudden fight rescues her from their den.

== Cast ==
- Chiranjit Chakraborty as Pallab Chatterjee
- Debashree Roy as Jaya
- Shankar Chakraborty as Samir
- Soumitra Bannerjee as Ranjit
- Dulal Lahiri as Jagamohan
- Subhasish Mukhopadhyay as Pallab's friend
- Satya Bandyopadhyay as Jaya's father
- Chitra Sen as Jaya's mother
