= Anushree Das =

Indian Bengali actress

- Born: Anuradha Das; Kolkata
- Occupation: Actress
- Known for: Bourani (1991); Rupban Kanya (1992); Bhai Amar Bhai (1996); Khela (2006 - 2008); Ishti Kutum (2011 - 2015); Jol Nupur (2013 - 2015); Punyi Pukur (2015 - 2017); Mohor (2019 - 2022); Khorkuto (2020 - 2022)
- Spouse: Bharat Kaul (m. 1996; div. 2003)

Anushree Das is an Indian actress of Bengali cinema and television. Her first acting assignment was Shosti Theke Shosti a jatra that starred Supriya Devi in the lead. She made her silver screen-debut in Bhabesh Kundu's Bengali film Bourani (1991).

== Career ==
She started playing lead actress roles in the films Bourani directed by Bhabesh Kundu in 1991 and as the lead character Rupban in Rupban Kanya in 1992. She is highly acclaimed for her work in Bhai Amar Bhai (1996) and Praner Cheye Priyo (1998). Then she started her career as a television actress with Zee Bangla's Khela and is mostly seen in serials of Magic Moments Motion Pictures.

== Filmography ==
| Year | Title | Note | Ref. |
|---|---|---|---|
| 1991 | Bourani | | |
| 1992 | Rupban Kanya | | |
| 1994 | Biswas Abiswas | | |
| 1994 | Amodini | | |
| 1994 | Naga Jyoti | | |
| 1995 | Ujan | | |
| 1996 | Aboojh Mon | | |
| 1996 | Bhai Amar Bhai | | |
| 1997 | Bakul Priya | | |
| 1997 | Ram Laxman | Odia film | |
| 1998 | Singha Bahini | Odia film | |
| 1998 | Praner Cheye Priyo | | |
| 1998 | Swamir Aadesh | | |
| 2012 | 8:08 Er Bongaon Local | | |

== Television ==
| Year | Title | Role | Language | Network |
|---|---|---|---|---|
| 2006 - 2008 | Khela | Shyama | Bengali | Zee Bangla |
| 2009 - 2012 | Binni Dhaner Khoi | Mohor's aunt aka Kamma | Bengali | ETV Bangla |
| 2011 - 2015 | Ishti Kutum | Kankamoni Soren | Bengali | Star Jalsha |
| 2013 - 2015 | Jol Nupur | Srishti Mukherjee | Bengali | Star Jalsha |
| 2015 - 2016 | Kojagori | Saheb's eldest aunt (Later replaced by Lopamudra Sinha) | Bengali | Zee Bangla |
| 2015 - 2017 | Punyi Pukur | Barrister Shrestha Banerjee | Bengali | Star Jalsha |
| 2018 - 2019 | Bajlo Tomar Alor Benu | Sunanda Pal (Later replaced by Bidipta Chakraborty) | Bengali | Star Jalsha |
| 2018 - 2019 | Phagun Bou | Bidhumukhi Bose | Bengali | Star Jalsha |
| 2018 - 2020 | Nokshi Kantha | Kankana Bose | Bengali | Zee Bangla |
| 2019–2022 | Mohor | Dr. Aditi Roy Chowdhury | Bengali | Star Jalsha |
| 2019–2021 | Sreemoyee | Antara Bose | Bengali | Star Jalsha |
| 2020–2022 | Khorkuto | Basumati Mukherjee | Bengali | Star Jalsha |
| 2023 | Balijhor | Sroth's aunt | Bengali | Star Jalsha |
| 2023 | Meyebela | Bithika Mitra | Bengali | Star Jalsha |
| 2023 | Ekka Dokka | Manini | Bengali | Star Jalsha |
| 2023–2024 | Dwitiyo Basanta | Aniruddha's mother | Bengali | Sun Bangla |
| 2025 | Chirodini Tumi Je Amar | Bhairavi Maa (later replaced by Chaitali Chakraborty) | Bengali | Zee Bangla |
