= Achintya Kumar Sengupta =

Indian Bengali-language writer

- Born: 19 September 1903; Noakhali, Bengal Presidency, British India
- Died: 29 January 1976 (aged 72); Kolkata, West Bengal, India
- Other name: Niharika Devi (pseudonym)
- Education: Asutosh College; University of Calcutta
- Occupations: Writer, Poet, Novelist, biographers, editor, short story writer
- Years active: 1921–1976
- Notable work: Bede, Kakjoshna, Uttarayan, Amabasya, Purba Paschim
- Movement: Kallol, Little magazine movement
- Relatives: Jitendra Kumar Sengupta (brother)
- Awards: Jagattarini Award (1975); Rabindra Puraskar (1975); Saratchandra Smriti Award (1975)

Achintya Kumar Sengupta (born 19 September 1903 – 29 January 1976) was an Indian Bengali-language poet, story writer, novelist, biographer and editor.

== Life ==
He was born in Noakhali, now in Bangladesh. At the age of 13, after his father's death, Sengupta moved to Calcutta, where he completed his schooling. He got a B. A. Honours degree from South Suburban College in English, followed by an M. A. degree from the University of Calcutta. Subsequently, he obtained a degree in Law and entered the judicial service in 1928 as a Civil Judge (Junior Division) and Assistant Magistrate Second Class. He served as a Judge in Magistrate Courts of Kolkata and District Courts of Krishnanagar, Midnapore, Dinajpore, and Kushtia. He retired as a Principal District Judge of the Alipore Court in 1961.

== Works ==
He started writing under a pen name, ‘Niharika Debi’. He contributed to almost all genres of Bengali literature, but is best remembered for his novels and short stories. In all, he wrote more than 100 books. Sengupta was closely associated with the famous magazine Kallol, and was its editor for some time.

=== Novels ===
- Bede
- Akoshik
- Kakjyotsna
- Bibaher Cheye Boro
- Indrani
- Prachir O Prantor
- Urnonav
- Nobonita
- Je Jai Boluk
- Asumodru Antorongo
- Pratham Kadam Phool

=== Story collections ===
- Tuta Futa
- Eti
- Okalbosonto
- Odhibus
- Double Decker
- Polayon
- Jotonbibi
- Sareng
- Hari Muchi Dom
- Kalorokto
- Kath Khor Kerosine
- Chasa Bhusha
- Ekartri
- Jashomoti

=== Poetry ===
- Amabasya
- Amra
- Priya O Prithibi
- Neel Akash
- Purba Paschim
- Uttarayan

=== Biographies ===
- Param Purush Sriramkrishna-1
- Param Purush Sriramkrishna-2
- Param Purush Sriramkrishna-3
- Param Purush Sriramkrishna-4
- Poromaprokriti Sri Sarodamoni
- Okhondo Omiyo Srigourango
- Bireshor Bibekananda
- Rotnakor Girishchandra
- Amritapurush Jishu
- Udyata Kharga Subhash

=== Others ===
- Kollol Joog
- Joishter Jhor

== Awards ==
He received the Jagattarini Award, Rabindra Puraskar and the Saratchandra Smriti Award in 1975 for his outstanding contributions to literature and journalism.

== Death ==
He died in Kolkata on 29 January 1976.
