= Sujit Guha =

Indian film director (born 1950)

Sujit Guha (born 23 July 1950) is an Indian film director known for his works in Bengali cinema.

== Career ==
Guha was born in Jessore district in East Pakistan. The first film he directed, Sankalpa was released in 1982. However, he gained recognition in the Bengali film industry with the movie Pakhiburor Kanya (1988). This was the last film featuring Santosh Dutta, in which he appeared in a guest role. He has also directed numerous blockbuster films such as Dadamoni, Amar Sangi, Amar Prem, and Mone Mane Na.

== Award ==
In 1989, Guha received the Mima Memorial Film Award in Mumbai for the film Pakhiburor Kanya.

== Filmography ==
- Miss Butterfly (2015)
- Mon Je Kore Uru Uru (2010)
- Neel Akasher Chandni (2009)
- Mon Mane Naa (2008)
- Sangharsha (2007)
- Eri Naam Prem (2006)
- Agnipath (2005)
- Nayak (2005)
- Deva (2002)
- Prem Pratigya (2001)
- Kulangar (2000)
- Agnisikha (1999)
- Ganga (1998)
- Manasa Kanya (1997)
- Moner Manush (1997)
- Pratham Dekha (1992)
- Ananda Niketan (1991)
- Mandira (1990)
- Amar Prem (1989)
- Aakrosh (1989)
- Jhankar (1989)
- Bandini (1989)
- Asha O Bhalobasha (1989)
- Pakhiburor Kanya (1988)
- Dolanchanpa (1987)
- Amar Sangee (1987)
- Kshyapa Thakur (1987)
- Bouma (1986)
- Abhiman (1986)
- Lalmahal (1986)
- Dadamoni (1984)
- Sankalpa (1982)
