= Lily Chakraborty =

- Born: 15 January 1972 (age 54); Kolkata, West Bengal, India
- Genres: Ghazal, Classical
- Occupations: Composer, singer, bengali poet
- Instruments: Vocals, harmonium, guitar, piano
- Label: KAT Music
- Website: lilychakraborty.com

Lily Chakraborty (born 15 January 1972) is an Indian Ghazal singer, Bengali poet and composer. Her works include the short story Galpo Gucco (2009) and the poetry books Akakitto (2009) and Chandey Kabo (2010). Chakraborty's 2009 album, Janele-Aye-Dil, is the first digitally recorded release in India.

== Award ==
- Music Academy Awards
- Artistry Awards

== Discography ==
- Janele-Aye-Dil 2009
- Live in Concert 2010
- Tribute to Jagjit Singh 2012
- Hulchul 2013

== Books ==
- Akakitto 2009
- Bhabna 2011
- Galpo Gucco 2009
- Prem 2010
- Chandey Kabo 2010
- Gucco Kabita 2011
