= Mon Mane Na (1992 film) =

- The poster for the film
- Directed by: Inder Sen
- Starring: Prosenjit Chatterjee; Shilpa Bhattacharya
- Music by: Babul Bose
- Distributed by: A.V.A. Films Productions
- Release date: 5 January 1992
- Running time: 138 minutes
- Country: India
- Language: Bengali

Mon Mane Na is a 1992 Indian Bengali romance film directed by Inder Sen featuring Prosenjit Chatterjee and Shilpa Bhattacharya.

== Plot ==
Dipak and Shikha picnic with their friends and the couple enjoys ribbing each other. Dipak's barrister father, Bhabotosh Bose, has ordered him to study law as his main subject after he completes his B.Com. Shikha does not share the same perspective on life. She has three of her maternal uncles: the elder one likes to act in plays, the middle one was fond of songs and the last was a karate master. The one thing common among all of them is they love Shikha.

They come to college separately to sit for their examinations, but Shikha finds she is unable to sit since her exam has already started. Shikha is crying when Dipak encounters her. She says that being orphaned and in the care of her maternal uncles, she is unable to face her uncles. Dipak feels for her and plays a trick to solve the problem.

Shikha and Dipak fall in love. Dipak introduces her to his mother; she likes the girl. His father saw them on a road and was not so quick with his opinion of her; he asks his wife Protima to learn of her background. Shikha is having a conversation with her Mejomama while remembering when, on the death of her father, her maternal uncles come for her. Shikha and Dipak argue over the latter's birthday; there is some confusion between Dipak and Shikha's elder maternal uncle; Dipak hammers the uncle.

Shikha's birthday is soon and Dipak wants to be at the celebration, but Shikha asks him to meet her in the park the next day. After some days Dipak's father decided to meet Shikha's maternal uncles to talk about his son's marriage. Shikha's uncles meet with the groom's father that when the uncles introduce themselves in relation to their passions, he is not assured of her suitability.

Dipak plays a prank to settle the situation. This time Dipak individually attempts to impress Shikha's uncles and he succeeds. Shikha's uncles decide that Shikha will marry the person they choose; they did not know that it was Dipak. They came to know about Dipak and are angry. Shikha is hurt by that action. The uncles realize that their anger is hurting Shikha and decide she should marry whom she wants. Dipak's father agrees with the change of heart of the uncles and Dipak and Shikha marry.

== Cast ==
- Soumitra Chatterjee as Bhabotosh Bose
- Prosenjit Chatterjee as Deepak Bose
- Shilpa Bhattacharya as Shikha
- Madhabi Mukherjee as Protima Bose
- Rabi Ghosh as Anil Chandro Dutta
- Anup Kumar as Pochu Chandro Dutta
- Chinmoy Roy as Nikhil Chandro Dutta
- Anamika Saha as Manoda

== Soundtrack ==
#	Title	Duration	Singer
1	Ekta Chithi Dilam Likhe anu	3:41	Kumar Sanu, Alka Yagnik
2	Kane Kane Boli Tumi Shono Barbar	5:20	Kumar Sanu, Kavita Krishnamurthy
3	Chadmobeshi Nayak Ami	4:03	Udit Narayan
4	Mama Tumi Amader Bhorosa	3:48	Kumar Sanu
5	Hamida Banu Kore Kusti	4:41	Kumar Sanu, Kavita Krishnamurthy
6	Mon Mane Na	4:16	Kumar Sanu, Alka Yagnik
7	Raag Koro Na	3:22	Alka Yagnik
8	Khukumani O Ma Janani	3:38	Udit Narayan, Deepa Narayan, Vinod Pandit
