= Prem Pujari (1991 film) =

1991 Bengali romantic drama film by Nandan Dasgupta

- Directed by: Nandan Dasgupta
- Starring: Prosenjit; Satabdi Roy; Deepankar Dey
- Cinematography: Kamal Nayak
- Music by: Swapan Jagmohan
- Production company: Joy Maa Kali Enterprise
- Release date: 1991
- Country: India
- Language: Bengali

Prem Pujari is a 1991 Indian Bengali romantic drama film directed by Nandan Dasgupta starring Prosenjit, Satabdi Roy, Deepankar Dey, Nirmal Kumar in the lead roles.

The film narrates the tale of Prem who falls in love with Radha, the daughter of the man who separated him from his parents and usurped their family wealth.

== Plot ==
The film is set in Hridoypur village where lives a wealthy zamindar named Surjokanto who has an immense love for dancing. He, however, always suspects his wife which is exploited by an evil Gadadhar who has an eye on Surjokanto's wealth. He successfully manages to make Surjokanto expel his pregnant wife, Sathi, from the village. Later, regretting his actions, Surjokanto slips into depression. Gadadhar decides to kill him. Sathi happens to know that Surjo committed suicide and handed over his property to Gadadhar. Her son, Prem, who grows up in an orphanage upon growing up goes to Hridoypur and falls in love with Radha who happens to be Gadadhar's daughter. The twist and turns that occur in Prem's life and how he unites with his parents form the rest of the story.

== Cast ==
- Prosenjit Chatterjee
- Satabdi Roy
- Deepankar Dey
- Nirmal Kumar
- Rajeshwari Raychoudhury
- Koushik Bandyopadhyay
- Manoj Mitra
- Tandra Dey

== Citations ==
=== Sources ===
"Prem Pujari on Induna"
