= Pabitra Papi =

1997 Indian Bengali film

- Directed by: Anup Sengupta
- Written by: Shaktipada Rajguru (original story)
- Starring: Prosenjit Chatterjee; Soumitra Chatterjee; Rituparna Sengupta; Abhishek Chatterjee
- Music by: Anupam Dutta
- Production company: Rainbow Movies
- Release date: 1997
- Country: India
- Language: Bengali

Pabitra Papi (English:Divine Sinner) is a 1997 Indian Bengali action drama [film directed by Anup Sengupta. Prosenjit Chatterjee, Soumitra Chatterjee, Rituparna Sengupta, Abhishek Chatterjee and Rabi Gosh portrayed the central characters. The film is noted for being one of the several films from Prosenjit-Rituparna duo. The film has musical score by Anupam Dutta.

== Plot ==
Bhola, a poor villager, strives for the welfare of his village. Rajib, an evil zamindar who aspires to open a liquor factory in the village schemes to seize the land of the villagers which however is successfully spoiled by Bhola. He is further infuriated by the news of Bhola's sister, Sudha, organising the villagers to fight against his atrocities. Though he decides to harm her, his plan fails due to his son, Dipon, falling in love with her. He marries her despite Rajib's warning of him losing his right over Rajib's property. Rajib appears to have a change of heart and accepts Sudha as his daughter in law. However, it is soon revealed that the entire incident including Dipon's marriage was pre-planned by Rajib and Dipon to seek revenge against Bhola and his sister. They accuse Bhola of attempting to rape Brinda and throw him behind bars after which they start to torture Sudha. The rest of the film deals with how Bhola manages to seek his revenge and save the village from the evil Rajib.

== Cast ==
- Prosenjit Chatterjee as Bhola
- Soumitra Chatterjee
- Rituparna Sengupta
- Abhishek Chatterjee
- Rabi Ghosh
- Koushik Bandyopadhyay
- Anamika Saha
- Pallavi Chatterjee
- Anushree Das
- Priya Das
