= Indrani Dutta =

Bengali film actress

- Born: 6 April 1970 (age 56); Kolkata, West Bengal, India
- Occupations: Actress, dancer
- Years active: 1987–present
- Organization: Indrani Dutta Kala Niketan
- Spouse: Janardan Paul
- Children: Rajnandini Paul (Daughter)
- Website: indranidutta.com

Indrani Dutta is an Indian actress and dancer. Primarily known for her work in Bengali cinema, Dutta has received several accolades including a BFJA Award.

Dutta made her big screen debut in Sushil Mukherjee's Bengali drama film Nadiya Nagar (1987). In the same year, she starred opposite Tapas Paul in Rajat Das' love triangle film Paap Punya. She collaborated with Paul in Biresh Chatteejee's Tufan (1989) which became a major financial success.

== Early life and education ==
Dutta was born on 6 April, 1970 in Kolkata. She is the youngest child of Dr. Himangshu Jyoti Dutta and Manjushree Dutta. She attended Kamala Girls' High School. Dutta became graduate in arts from the Sivanath Sastri College, under the University of Calcutta. Under the guidance of her Guru Sumitra Mitra, she was conferred Pravakar in Kathak dance by Allahabad University.

== Career ==
=== Acting ===
Indrani appeared in a number of Bengali telefilms such as Thir Bijuri, Thager Ghar, Swet Mayur, Hathat Bristi and in serials such as Chira Kumar Sabha, Sesh Prasno, Sima Rekha and Louha Kapat is praiseworthy. In 1997, Indrani acted in the episode Necklace for the Hindi TV series Byomkesh Bakshi as Uma. She acts in the television show named Jibon Saathi aired on Zee Bangla since 2020.

=== Dance ===
Indrani has a passion for dance; this passion led her to create her own dance school in Kolkata. Before opening this dance school, she had also had her own dance troupe, named "Srishti". Indrani Dutta Kala Niketan is now a popular dance institution of Kolkata. The dance troupe and the dance school have presented many shows in India and overseas.

== Awards ==
Year	Award	Category	Title
1995	Bharat Nirman Award		
1998	BFJA Award	Best Actress award	Shedin Choitromaash
2017	MOTHER TERESA AWARD		Nayeekar Bhumikay

== Filmography ==
=== Bengali films ===
Year	Film name	Director	Role	Ref.
1987	Nadiya Nagar	Sushil Mukherjee	Actor (Bishnupriya)	
1987	Pap Punya	Rajat Das	Actor	
1988	Apaman	Chandan Mukherjee	Actor	
1988	Maa Ek Mandir	Sukhen Das	Actor	
1989	Aghatan Ajo Ghate	Amal Mitra	Actor	
1989	Aparanher Alo	Agradoot	Actor	
1989	Tufan	Biresh Chatterjee	Actor (Lina)	
1990	Apan Aamar Apan	Tarun Majumdar	Actor	
1990	Byabodhan	Dilip Mukherjee	Actor	
1990	Ladai	Rana Mukhopadhay	Actor	
1990	Papi	Prabhat Roy	Actor	
1990	Shesh Aghat	Jayanta Purkayastha	Actor	
1991	Pati Param Guru	Biresh Chattopadhyay	Actor	
1991	Prashna	Saran Dey	Actor	
1992	Surer Bhubane	Prabir Mitra	Actor	
1992	Shesh Biday	Milan Bhowmik	Actor	
1992	Shaitan	Sachin Adhikari	Actor	
1992	Krodhi	Panna Hussain	Actor	
1994	Tumi Je Aamar	Inder Sen	Actor	
1995	Premsangee	Prabir Mitra	Actor	
1995	Patibrata	Nitai Goswami	Actor	
1995	Kencho Khunrte Keute	Chiranjit	Actor (Parama)	
1995	Sukher Asha	Sadhan	Actor	
1996	Tridhara	Prashanta Nanda	Actor	
1996	Parikrama	Shantimoy Bandyopadhyay	Actor	
1996	Nikhonj	Dipen Pal	Actor	
1997	Mittir Barir Chhoto Bou	Sushil Mukherjee	Actor	
1997	Sedin Chaitramas	Prabhat Roy	Actor (Kusum)	
1997	Nishpap Asami	Swapan Saha	Actor	
1999	Dadabhai	Unknown	Actor	
1999	Swapno Niye	Bishnu Paul Chowdhury	Actor	
1999	Santan Jakhan Satru	Swapan Saha	Actor	
2000	Dabi	Unknown	Actor	
2000	Master Moshai	Unknown	Guest Appearance in "Bhalobaste sekho ei Jibon take"	
2008	Janatar Adalat	Manoj Thakur	Actor	
2009	Krishna	Shankar Roy	Actor	
2010	Soldier	Dulal Bhowmick	Actor	
2010	Preyashi	Purnendu Halder	Actor	
2010	Hangover	Prabhat Roy	Guest Appearance in "Joy Joy Bolo"	
2014	Khancha	Raja Sen	Guest appearance in an item Song	
2015	Belaseshe	Shiboprasad Mukherjee & Nandita Roy	Actor (Sarmistha)	
2017	Nayeekar Bhumikaay	Swagata CHowdhury	Actor (Lahana)	
2017	Sedin Basante	Sanjay Guha	Actor (Anuradha)	
2019	Bela Shuru	Shiboprasad Mukherjee & Nandita Roy	Actor	
2019	Kolkatay Kohinoor	Santanu Ghosh	Actor (Anamika)	

=== Television ===
Year	Title	Character	Role	Channel	Production
2020-2022	Jibon Saathi	Shalankara Banarjee	Antagonist (later turned Positive)	Zee Bangla	Blues Productions
2023-2024	Jagaddhatri	Mohini Roy Chowdhury(Deceased)/Mallika Roy Chowdhury	Dual Role	Zee Bangla	Blues Productions
2025-2026	Besh Korechi Prem Korechi	Rajrani	Parallel Lead	Zee Bangla	Blues Productions

=== Mahisasurmardini ===
Year	Title	Role	Channel	Ref.
2005	Mahisasurmardini	Durga	ETV Bangla	
2010	Mahisasurmardini	Durga	Star Ananda	
