= Subhendu Chatterjee =

Indian actor (1936–2007)

Doctor Shubhendu Chatterjee
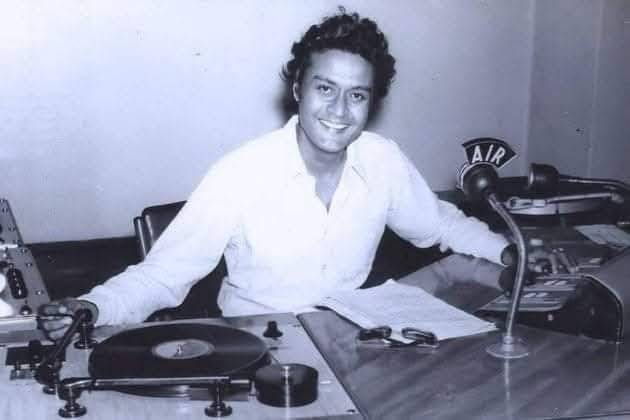
- Born: 29 November 1936; Calcutta, Bengal Presidency, British India (now Kolkata, West Bengal, India)
- Died: 5 July 2007 (aged 70); AMRI Hospital, Kolkata, West Bengal, India
- Education: Medical College & Hospital, Kolkata (M.B.B.S.)
- Occupations: Actor, Physician
- Years active: 1965–2006
- Spouse: Anjali Chatterjee
- Children: Saswata Chatterjee

Shubhendu Chattopadhyay (29 November 1936 – 5 July 2007) was an Indian physician and actor, who is known for acting in Bengali television and films. A contemporary of actors Uttam Kumar and Soumitra Chatterjee, with whom he played second hero in many films, Chatterjee graduated into character roles.

== Personal life ==
His father was Shailendra Chattopadhay and mother was Manimala Devi. In 1953, he was admitted into Calcutta Medical College. In 1960, he completed his M.B.B.S. and became a physician. He worked in Civil Defence and later joined Kolkata Municipal Corporation.

He was involved with amateur theatre under the tutelage of Jnanesh Mukherjee, a stalwart of Bengali theatre and films. He was involved with the IPTA. Chatterjee had two sons; Saswata Chatterjee, the eldest son, is a Bengali actor.

== Career ==
He started his film career with Mrinal Sen's Akash Kusum in 1965. He was appreciated for his restrained portrayal of the honest friend who would fail to prevent his go-getting friend (played by Soumitra Chatterjee) from the path of falsehood which would lead to utter humiliation. He worked with Satyajit Ray in Chiriyakhana (1967) where he first shared the screen with Uttam Kumar; he then worked with the versatile Soumitra in Aranyer Din Ratri (1969) that brought national and international fame. He is mostly remembered for his portrayal of Sankar in Chowringhee in 1968 where alongside the matinee idol Uttam Kumar, he carved his niche as the straight and compassionate apprentice (the author's character) of a five-star hotel on the brink of changing ownership. He then starred as the leading actor in Hansa Mithun (1968), Panchasar (1968), Arogya Niketon (1969), Nayikar Bhumikay, Anindita, along with playing second lead in Chaddabeshi (1972), and Ekhoni. He also played the protagonist in Bhanu Goenda Jahar Assistant. Some of his other noteworthy movies include Pratham Kadam Phool, Kuheli, Kaach Kata Hire, Aandhar Periye, Bigolito Karuna Jahnabi Yamuna, Jibon Rahasya, Bahurupi, Amrito Kumbher Sandhane, Ganasatru, Lal Darwajaa.

By the time he acted with the legendary Uttam Kumar in Chowringhee and Chaddabeshi, he was already a heartthrob with his tall, dark, handsome, and intelligent looks. He acted in the sequel of Aranyer Din Ratri, directed by Gautam Ghose, Abar Aranye, in 2003.

Chatterjee also was a stage actor and the play "Bilkish Begum" staged during the 1980s was a hit. He also played a role in the play "Amar Kantak" which also ran many nights. He acted in a number of tele-films as well; including as Dr. Munshi in "Dr. Munshi's diary" based on a short story by Satyajit Ray. He was a singer as well and cut a disc on composition of Hemanta Mukhopadhyay.

== Death ==
He died from respiratory tract complications. The Bengali film industry went into a state of mourning as the news of his death spread.

== Filmography ==
- Bhalobasa as Doctor
- Kaach Kata Hirey as friend of Subroto and brother of Uma
- Akash Kusum (1965) as Ajay's friend
- Chiriyakhana (1967) as Bijoy
- Hangsa-Mithun (1968)
- Chowringhee (1968) as Shankar
- Arogya Niketan (1967) as (Subhendu Chatterji)
- Aranyer Din Ratri (1970) (as Subhendu Chatterji) as Sanjay Bannerjee
- Kuheli (1971) as Prashanto
- Chhadmabeshi (1971) as Subimal
- Anindita (1972)
- Aandhar Periye (1973)
- Chorus (1974) as Photo-journalist
- Rajnandini (1980)
- Ekanta Apan (1987)
- Amar Sangi (1987) as Indranil
- Aagoon (1988)
- Ganashatru (1989) as Biresh
- Asha O Bhalobasha (1989)
- Aakrosh (1989)
- Jamaibabu
- Apan Por (1992) as Doctor
- Lal Darja (1997) as Nabin Datta
- Moner Manush (1997)
- Dahan (1997) as Jhinuk's father
- Desh (2002) as The MLA
- Abar Aranye (2003) as Sanjay Bannerjee
- Amar Mayer Shapath (2003) as Debendranath

== Awards ==
- Anandalok Award – Best Actor for Lal Darja in 1998
