= Pratibad =

2001 Indian Bengali vigilante action film by Haranath Chakraborty

- Pratibad film poster
- Directed by: Haranath Chakraborty
- Screenplay by: Anjan Choudhury
- Dialogues by: Anjan Choudhury
- Story by: Anjan Choudhury
- Produced by: Shrikant Mohta
- Starring: Ranjit Mallick; Prosenjit Chatterjee; Arpita Pal; Laboni Sarkar; Dipankar De; Debesh Roy Chowdhury; Arun Mukherjee; Nirmal Kumar; Anamika Saha; Sreela Majumdar
- Cinematography: V. Prabhakar
- Edited by: Swapan Guha
- Music by: Songs: Babul Bose; Background Score: S. P. Venkatesh
- Production company: Shree Venkatesh Films
- Distributed by: Eskay Video
- Release date: 13 April 2001
- Running time: 149 minutes
- Country: India
- Language: Bengali
- Budget: ₹80 lakh

Pratibad (English: Protest) is a 2001 Indian Bengali-language action drama film directed by Haranath Chakraborty. Produced by Shrikant Mohta under the banner of Shree Venkatesh Films, the story, screenplay and dialogues of the film were written by Anjan Choudhury, which itself was based on the political violence that rocked Bengal during the late 90s. It stars Ranjit Mallick, Prosenjit Chatterjee and Arpita Pal in lead roles; while Dipankar De, Laboni Sarkar, Debesh Roy Chowdhury, Arun Mukherjee, Nirmal Kumar, Anamika Saha, Sreela Majumdar and Rajesh Sharma play another pivotal roles.

Pratibad was released on 13 April 2001 worldwide and became blockbuster at the box office and ran for 210 days in theatres; also being the highest-grossing Bengali film of 2001. It was declared to be tacs-free by the Government of West Bengal and it eventually gained a cult status in the history of Bengali cinema. After the massive success of Sasurbari Zindabad in Assam, the film was released in Assamese as Ranabhumi and achieved commercial success.

== Plot ==
The story is of a middle-class family struggling financially. The family consists of two sisters, mother and father. Prosenjit Chatterjee as a Rana is the main and a promising character. He is a daredevil and a terrific fighter against injustice. Once, he was travelling with his pregnant sister in a train, he begged everybody for a seat for his sister, but no one paid heed. There were some burglars in the train who started looting, but Rana saved it from happening. By this act, he was given the job of a police officer. In Rana's area of jurisdiction, there lived an MLA name Bikas. He was a very corrupt politician and indulged in illegal activities. There lived another man Azad who fought against injustice everywhere. Now this minister's girl Jaya, fell in love with Rana. Once, it so happened that while Rana's sister was about to give birth to her child, this minister, Bikas, tried to kill Rana, but his sister was injured and ultimately died. Then Rana decided to take revenge but was initially not allowed to do so. Ultimately MLA Bikas's real character was revealed, and in a serious fighting with Rana, MLA Bikas dies.

== Cast ==
- Ranjit Mallick as Azad Da
- Prosenjit Chatterjee as Rana Mitra, an ordinary person
- Arpita Pal as Jaya
- Laboni Sarkar as MP Namita Sanyal
- Dipankar De as Kalu Prasad, Central Home Minister
- Debesh Roy Chowdhury as MLA Bikash Dutta
- Arun Mukherjee as ACP Mukherjee
- Anamika Saha as Beena Mitra, Rana's Mother
- Nirmal Kumar as Pratap Mitra, Rana's Father
- Bharat Kaul as MLA's son
- Sreela Majumdar as Meenu, Rana's elder sister
- Subhasish Mukherjee as Police Constable
- Monu Mukherjee as Anil Manna, Landlord
- Rajesh Sharma as Tinu
- Master Debarjun as Chhottu
- Mitali Chakraborty as Meenu, Chhottu's elder sister
- Pushpita Mukherjee as Tina

== Soundtrack ==
Pratibad

Soundtrack album by Babul Bose
- Released: May 2001
- Recorded: 2001
- Studios: Musicians Studio, (Mumbai)
- Genre: Feature film soundtrack
- Length: 27:01
- Language: Bengali
- Label: Eskay Video
- Producers: Jay Ghosh, Shanu Mukherjee

Babul Bose chronology
Aasroy (2000)	Pratibad (2001)	Dada Thakur (2001)

The album is composed by Babul Bose, while lyrics are penned by Goutam Susmit. The background score is composed by S. P. Venkatesh. Babul Supriyo, Kumar Sanu, Poornima, Sadhana Sargam, Miss Jojo has given their voices for the album.

All lyrics are written by Gautam Susmit.

No.	Title	Singer(s)	Length
1.	"Ki Holo Ki Hobe"	Kumar Sanu, Poornima	3:55
2.	"Aasbe Ghare Khokon Sona"	Babul Supriyo, Sadhana Sargam	3:53
3.	"Elo Monete Basanto Bahar"	Poornima	4:39
4.	"Pratibad title track (Charidike Lootpaat Hahakaar)"	Arshad	4:01
5.	"Jakhoni Jedike Chai"	Sadhana Sargam	4:32
6.	"Koli Kale Ghore Koli Haar"	Babul Supriyo, Arshad, Priya Bhattacharya	6:01
Total length:			27:01
