= Surya (2004 film) =

- Film poster
- Surya
- Directed by: Haranath Chakraborty
- Written by: Snehasis Chakraborty; V. V. Vinayak (Story & Screenplay); Subhash Sen (Additional Dialogues)
- Produced by: Sinjini Movies (P) Ltd.
- Starring: Prosenjit Chatterjee; Ranjit Mallick; Anu Choudhury; Arunima Ghosh; Dipankar De
- Cinematography: V. Prabhakar
- Edited by: Swapan Guha
- Music by: Songs: Babul Bose; Background Score: S. P. Venkatesh
- Distributed by: Sinjini Movies (P) Ltd.
- Release date: 21 May 2004
- Country: India
- Language: Bangla

Surya is a 2004 Bengali-language action drama film co-written and directed by Haranath Chakraborty. It stars Prosenjit Chatterjee, Ranjit Mallick and Anu Chowdhury in the lead roles. The movie is a remake of the 2002 Telugu movie Aadi.

== Plot ==
Ashok, a businessman, provides shelter to Mahim Halder who kills him and takes over his property. Later, Ashok's son, Surjo, sets out to avenge his father's death.

== Cast ==
- Prosenjit Chatterjee as Surjo Narayan Chowdhury
- Anu Chowdhury as Reena, Surjo's love interest
- Arunima Ghosh as Pooja Halder, Mahim Halder's daughter
- Ranjit Mallick as Avinash, Head of Pancha Pandav, Surjo's adopted father
- Ashok Bhattacharya as Ashok Narayan Chowdhury, Surjo's biological father
- Dulal Lahiri as 2nd member of Pancha Pandav
- Rajesh Sharma as 3rd member of Pancha Pandav
- Arun Banerjee as Village headmaster
- Subhasish Mukherjee as Shambhu, Reena's brother and son of village headmaster
- Dipankar De as Mahim Halder
- Kanchan Mallick as College student
- Debesh Raychowdhury as 4th member of Pancha Pandav
- Anamika Saha as Mahim Halder's wife
- Mrinal Mukherjee as 5th member of Pancha Pandav
- Nilabhra Sett as Surjo (child role)
- Premjit Mukherjee as Ratan Halder, Mahim Halder's son
- Diganta Bagchi as Monty
- Mrityun Hazra as Satya, Mahim Halder's henchman
- Joy Badlani as SP Bijoy Panda

== Soundtrack ==
Surya

Soundtrack album by Babul Bose
- Released: 21 May 2004
- Recorded: 2004
- Genre: Feature film soundtrack
- Length: 29:15
- Language: Bengali
- Label: Eskay Movies
- Producer: Sinjini Movies (P) Ltd.

Babul Bose chronology
Dada Thakur (2001)	Surya (2004)	Gyarakal (2004)

The album is composed by Babul Bose while lyrics are penned by Gautam Susmit. The background score is composed by S. P. Venkatesh.

Kumar Sanu, Shaan, Udit Narayan, Sadhana Sargam, Shreya Ghoshal, Sneha Panth has given their voices for the album.

No.	Title	Lyrics	Singer(s)	Length
1.	"Choriye Gelo Bhalobasa"	Gautam Susmit	Udit Narayan, Sadhana Sargam	04:48
2.	"Phoske Gele Emon Chhele"	Gautam Susmit	Shaan	04:20
3.	"Amar Boyos Holo Solo"	Gautam Susmit	Shreya Ghoshal
4.	"Elore Khushir Din"	Gautam Susmit	Babul Supriyo, Sadhana Sargam
5.	"Alor Path Je Mukti Aane"	Gautam Susmit	Kumar Sanu
6.	"Alor Path Je Mukti Aane (Sad)"	Gautam Susmit	Kumar Sanu
Total length:				29:15
