= Kache Aye Shoi =

Indian television series

- Genre: Indian Soap Opera
- Created by: Blues Productions
- Story by: Snehashish Chakraborty; Dialogues; Snehashish Chakraborty
- Directed by: Anup Chakraborty; Simanta Banerjee
- Starring: Chandni Saha; Mimi Dutta
- Voices of: Madhuraa Bhattacharya
- Opening theme: "Kache Aye Shoi"
- Composer: Snehashish Chakraborty
- Country of origin: India
- Original language: Bengali
- No. of seasons: 1
- No. of episodes: 308

Production
- Producer: Snehashish Chakraborty
- Production location: Kolkata
- Running time: 22 Minutes
- Production company: Blues Productions

Original release
- Network: Zee Bangla
- Release: 29 April 2013 – 26 April 2014

Related
- Swapath; Bibi Chowdhurani

Kache Aye Shoi (English: Come Close Shoi) was a Bengali television serial. It used to air on Zee Bangla.

== Cast ==
- Chandni Saha as Shoi
- Mimi Dutta as Brishti
- Priyam as Ujaan Roy Chowdhury
- Gourab Roy Chowdhury as Roop
- Bhaswar Chatterjee as Tiyash
- Rupsha Chakraborty as Raahi
- Anuradha Mukherjee as Anuradha Sen
- Ratna Ghoshal as Shoi's grandmother
- Shaon Dey as Shampa
- Pushpita Mukherjee as Mithu
- Sanghamitra Talukder as Rinku
- Subhadra Mukherjee as Roop's mother
- Debika Mitra as Ujaan's mother
- Bhaskar Banerjee as Ashok
- Rana Mitra as Pratap
- Rita Dutta Chakraborty as Moni ma
- Nabanita Dutta as Panna
- Sucheta Chakraborty as Bristi's mother
- Sanjib Sarkar as Bristi's father
- Bhavana Banerjee as Tupshi
- Uma Bardhan as Tupshi's mother
- Joyjit Banerjee as Suraj
- Shankar Chakraborty as Shankar
- Ritoja Majumder as Ashok's wife
- Debraj Mukherjee as Shoi's late father
