= Bajimaat =

- Directed by: Haranath Chakraborty
- Written by: Pijush Saha (story)
- Screenplay by: Monotosh Chakraborty
- Produced by: Prince Entertainment P4
- Starring: Soham; Subhashree
- Cinematography: V.Pravhakar
- Edited by: Sawapan Guha
- Music by: S. P. Venkatesh
- Distributed by: Prince Entertainment P4.
- Release date: 6 June 2008
- Running time: 160 minutes
- Country: India
- Language: Bengali

Bajimaat (Bengali: বাজিমাত) is a 2008 Bengali musical romantic action film directed by Haranath Chakraborty. This marked the debut of Soham Chakraborty as well as Subhashree Ganguly in their lead roles.

== Synopsis ==
Suvra is a lower middle class young boy, who dreams of becoming a big singer. His girlfriend Jhilik also dreams of becoming a singer. Suvra and Jhilik are both trapped by a company of a reality show organisation. Suvra loses a lakh of rupees, which is actually his college admission fee for computer engineering. But his father cannot bear this shock and suffers from a massive heart attack. To save his family, Suvra gives up his dream and starts working for a TV Channel. The CEO of this TV channel, Sanjay Sen supports Suvra. On the other hand, Jhilik is also exploited by Rohit, son of the reality show organiser. Rohit separates Suvra and Jhilik. But ultimately, with the sponsorship of Sanjay Sen and the sacrifice of Jhilik, Suvra becomes the Singer of Bengal. Suvra and Jhilik are reunited as lovers.

== Cast ==
- Soham as Suvra
- Subhashree as Jhilik
- Ranjit Mallick as Sanjay Mitra, Suvra's well wisher and mentor
- Santu Mukhopadhyay as Suvra's father
- Rajatava Dutta as Satyabrata, the main antagonist
- Rajesh Sharma as Chanu Babu
- Debika Mitra
- Soumili Biswas as Suvra's sister
- Sudip Mukherjee as Husband of Jhilik's sister
- Aparajita Auddy as Jhilik's sister
- Biswanath Basu as Suvra's friend
- Surajit Sen as Rohit

== Soundtrack ==
Niluvaddham-famed playback singer Karthik marked his singing debut in Bengali cinema through this film.

- A Gaan Amar – Karthik
- Amar Gaaner (Female Vocals) – Alka Yagnik
- Amar Gaaner (Male Vocals) – Kartick
- Amar Prothom Prem – Karthik
- Bedonar Baluchore – Monu
- Chena Chena A Poth – Alka Yagnik
- Dhum Ta Na Na – Karthik
- Hi Baby Shono Na – Karthik
- Meghla Dine Meghla Mon – Alka Yagnik
- Sure Sure Sat Sure – Alka Yagnik
