= Pijush Saha =

Bengali film director

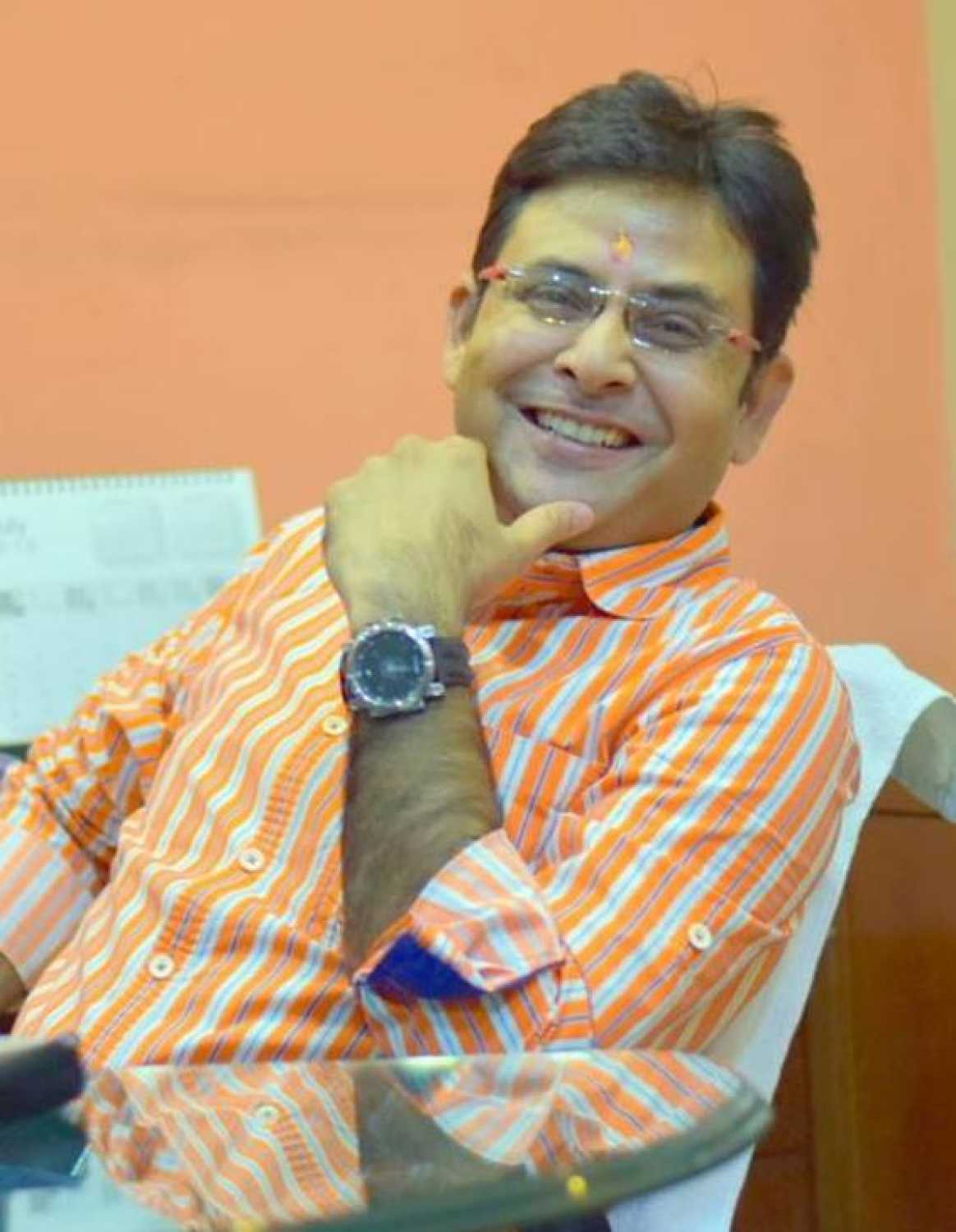
- Education: University of Calcutta
- Occupations: Director, producer, writer
- Years active: 2001–present
- Notable work: Beparoyaa; Kellafate; Bajimaat; Tulkalam
- Website: www.pijushsahafilms.com

Pijush Saha is an Indian film director, producer and writer from Kolkata. The first feature he directed was Satrur Mukabela (2002), which was followed by Kartabya (2003) Tulkalam (2007) Bajimat (2008) Neel Akasher Chandni (2009) Kellafate(2010) and Beparoyaa (2016).

== Filmography ==
As a director, writer and producer, Pijush Saha worked in the following Bengali films:

Denotes films that have not yet been released

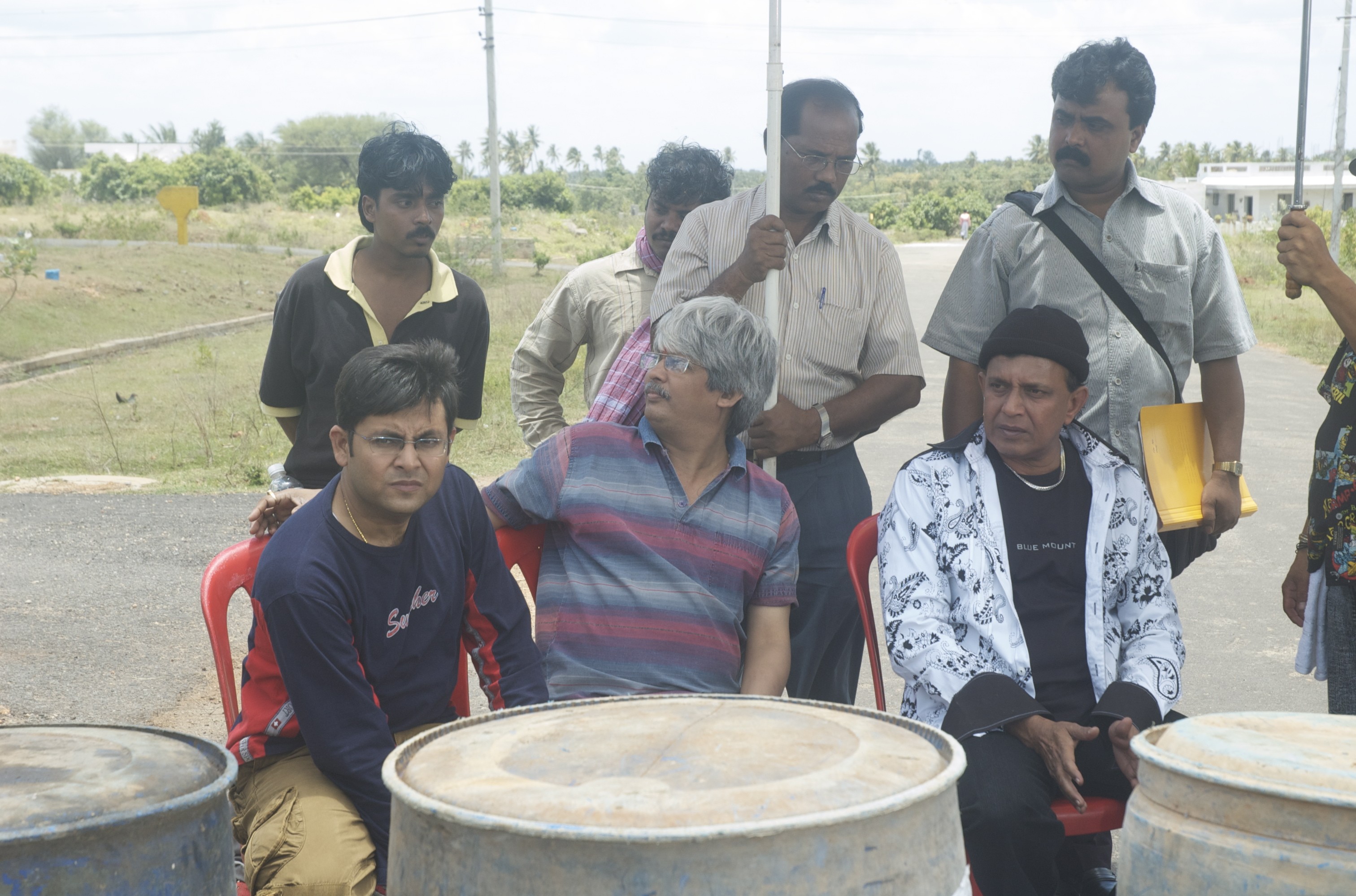
Pijush Saha during the shooting of movie "Tulkalam" in Mahishore

Year	Film	Notes
2002	Satrur Mukabela	Prosenjit Chatterjee
2003	Kartabya	Prosenjit Chatterjee
2004	Gyarakal	Prosenjit Chatterjee
2005	Raju Uncle	Prosenjit Chatterjee
2007	Tulkalam	Mithun Chakraborty
2008	Bajimat	Debut Soham Chakraborty Subhashree Ganguly
2009	Neel Akasher Chandni	Jeet; Koel Mallick; Jisshu Sengupta
2010	Kellafate	Debut Film Ankush Hazra
2016	Beparoyaa	Debut Film Rubel Das
2019	Tui Amar Rani	Rubel Das
2019	Hari Ghosher Gowal	Debut Film Srija and Newcomers
2022	Jaalbandi	Prince; Darshana Banik; Payel Sarkar; Pampi Saha
2024	Lalkuthi	Saurav Ray

== Awards ==
- Hero Honda 68th BFJA Awards for best clean & entertaining film Gerakal in 2005
- Kalakar Awards in Best Bengali Film category for the film Kellafate in 2010
- Kalakar Awards in Best Bengali Film category for the film Neel Akasher Chandni on 17 January 2010
