= Swapno =

- Theatrical release poster
- Directed by: Haranath Chakraborty
- Written by: Monotosh Chakraborty (story development)
- Screenplay by: Monotosh Chakraborty
- Story by: Shaktipada Rajguru
- Starring: Prosenjit Chatterjee; Sayantani Ghosh; Jisshu Sengupta; Abhishek Chatterjee; Soham Chakraborty
- Cinematography: V Prabhakar
- Edited by: Swapan Guha
- Music by: Hemanta Mukherjee; Shyamal Mitra; Madhu Mukherjee
- Distributed by: Saregama Films Limited
- Release date: 2006
- Running time: 150 minutes
- Country: India
- Language: Bengali

Swapno (transl. Dream) is a 2005 Bengali social drama film directed by Haranath Chakraborty. The film features actors Prosenjit Chatterjee, Sayantani Ghosh, Jisshu Sengupta, Abhishek Chatterjee, Deepankar De, Anamika Saha, and Rajesh Sharma in the lead roles. Music of the film has been composed by Hemanta Mukherjee, Shyamal Mitra and Madhu Mukherjee.

== Plot ==
The film deals with the life and aspirations of Ajoy, a needy but meritorious Youngman, though he had been the district topper in his school leaving exam yet he had to leave his studies and go to Kolkata to work in a college, Ajoy had been too stunned but had decided to sacrifice his dreams for his family, he had worked hard and even taken care of the garage owner. So after his death he became the owner of the garage. He brought his family to Kolkata and tried to fulfil even the smallest of their needs. Through an accident he came close to businessman's family he through them acquired a chance for his brother an aspiring cricketer. The younger brother is chosen / selected for the ranji trophy team. In the meantime the young daughter of the business man has fallen in love with Ajoy. Younger brother gets a job they shift into a mansion their lifestyle changes, though Ajoy and his father cannot keep pace with them their sister gets to work in a music album through younger brother's connections she gets involved with the man. The younger brother needs rs 10 lakh for training abroad. Asks Ajoy for it he expresses inability brother disheartened mother asks him to borrow from girlfriend's family. It is against his principles. He mortgages garage. Brother returns after training. Buys a new car gets money from endorsements but denies paying back Ajoy's money. Ajoy's garage taken over. His girlfriend Moly gets angry to know about it. He does not confide in her as he does not want to boast to boast about helping his own brother Mili's father offers to send him abroad with a job he does not accept. She breaks off their relationship younger brother gets selected in Indian team meets Mili decides to get married unaware of her relation with Ajoy. Ajoy works as a hawker after marriage he learns of Ajoy's true brother also gets to know of the past-starts suspecting them humiliates him he leaves the house and goes back to old home. Sister comes to him for help as she was pregnant. She tries to kill herself but is saved by Mili's brother proposes to marry her brother involves in match-fixing Ajoy learns of it and hands him over to the police. The brother released from jail.

== Cast ==
- Prosenjit Chatterjee as Ajoy Roy
- Sayantani Ghosh as Mili
- Jisshu Sengupta as Sujoy Roy
- Abhishek Chatterjee as Nikhil, Mili's brother
- Deepankar De as Ajoy and Sujoy's father
- Anamika Saha as Sarama, Ajoy and Sujoy's mother
- Rajesh Sharma as Natwarlal, cricket match fixing agent
- Meghna Halder as Lakkhi
- Bharat Kaul as Jackie
- Ramen Raychowdhury as Police commissioner
- Soham Chakraborty as young Ajoy

== Soundtrack ==
No.	Title	Lyrics	Music	Artist(s)	Length
1.	"Bidhi Re Ei Kheya"	Gauriprasanna Mazumder	Shyamal Mitra, Madhu Mukherjee	Amit Kumar	4:48
2.	"Chanchalo Mon Aanmona Hoy"	Mukul Dutt	Hemanta Mukherjee, Madhu Mukherjee	Udit Narayan; Sadhana Sargam	3:27
3.	"Muchhe Jaoa Din Guli"	Gauriprasanna Mazumder	Hemanta Mukherjee, Madhu Mukherjee	Babul Supriyo	4:01
4.	"Aaj Amar Praner"	Gautam Sushmit	Madhu Mukherjee	Babul Supriyo, Shaan, Sadhna Sargam
5.	"O Aakash Sona Sona"	Miltoo Ghosh	Hemanta Mukherjee, Madhu Mukherjee	Babul Supriyo; Shaan; Rima Mukherjee	3:41
6.	"O La La Baba Eki Jwala"	Gautam Sushmit	Madhu Mukherjee	Miss Jojo	4:18
