= Chirosathi =

- Chirosathi Movie Poster
- Directed by: Haranath Chakraborty
- Written by: Sushanta Sinha (story)
- Produced by: Zee Motion Pictures
- Starring: Hiran; Koel
- Cinematography: V. Prabhakar
- Edited by: Swapan Guha
- Music by: Ashok Raj
- Production company: Zee Motion Pictures
- Distributed by: Zee Motion Pictures
- Release date: 5 December 2008
- Country: India
- Language: Bengali

Chirosathi (Bengali: চিরসাথী) is a 2008 Bengali romantic drama film directed by Haranath Chakraborty and starring Hiran and Koel.

== Plot ==
Raju is an orphan youngster brought up by his aunt Namita. He falls in love with Riya Roy, the daughter of business tycoon Mahendra Roy. They meet at their college excursion, and after that initial tiffs and estrangement, they fall madly in love. While Mahendra Roy already zeroes in on getting Riya's married to Dhiman (the son of another business biggie Mr. Mohim), Raju arrives at Riya's residence in disguise with the help of Mahendra Roy's estranged young brother Pratap Roy. Within days Raju gets success by associating with Riya's joint family. But the conservative, chauvinist and patriarchal Mahendra Roy shifts bad and constantly sends negative vibes towards Raju in a passive way. In the meantime the spoilt brat Dhiman takes Riya to a pub and insults her to get beaten up by an avenging Raju. Without knowing the truth Mahendra Roy expels Raju from his house. Raju meanwhile reveals that his elder brother Apurva who has become insane incidentally loved Riya's elder sister and Mahendra's elder daughter Priya (she committed suicide). In the end Mahendra understands Dhiman's nature and the lovers unite gleefully.

== Cast ==
- Hiran as Raju
- Koel as Riya
- Deepankar De as Mahendra Roy
- Nimu Bhowmik as Sir
- Bhaswar Chattopadhyay as Dhiman
- Sumeet Ganguly as Johnny
- Pratim Chattopadhyay as Mohim Babu
- Anamika Saha as Dhiman's Mother
- Master Writorshi as Rinku (Introducing)
