= Bhaswar Chatterjee =

Indian actor (born 1975)

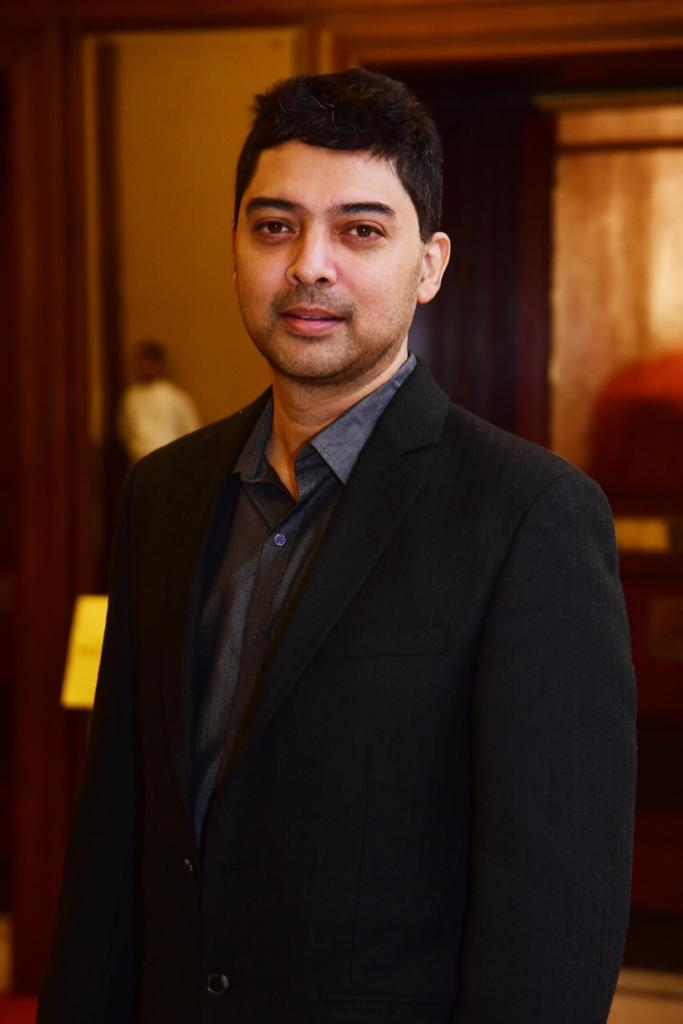
- Chatterjee in 2012
- Pronunciation: [bʱaʃːɔɾ t͡ʃɔʈːopad̪ʱːae̯]
- Born: 8 March 1975 (age 51); Calcutta, West Bengal, India
- Education: Ashutosh College
- Occupation: Actor
- Years active: 1998–present
- Known for: Playing Batukeshwar Dutt in The Legend of Bhagat Singh (2002)
- Spouse: Nabamita Chatterjee (m. 2014; div. 2020)
- Mother: Aparna Chatterjee
- Relatives: Devi Mukherjee (maternal grand-uncle); Gautam Mukherjee (maternal grand-uncle)

Bhaswar Chatterjee (Note: Bengali: ভাস্বর চট্টোপাধ্যায়, Bengali pronunciation: [bʱaʃːɔɾ t͡ʃɔʈːopad̪ʱːae̯].) (Bengali: ভাস্বর চট্টোপাধ্যায়, pronounced [bʱaʃːɔɾ t͡ʃɔʈːopad̪ʱːae̯]; born 8 March 1975) is an Indian actor who works in Bengali film and television.

In 1998, his first appearance on television was in Jaltaranga followed by Bishnu Pal Chowdhury's Kanakanjali. Chatterjee established himself in the Bollywood industry with The Legend of Bhagat Singh in 2002 by playing Batukeshwar Dutt, and with the daily soap Janmobhumi in 2003. As of 2020, he has appeared in 125 daily soaps and a total of 111 serials in the Bengali language.

He was a member of Indian censor board from 2014 to 2017. Bhaswar is a writer too,till date he has 14 novels to his credit.Some of the best sellers are Onyo Upotyaka,Maharani Didda,Shrikanto Manjiler Rahasya,Kacher Swargo for which he was awarded Samaresh Majumdar Sahitya Samman in 2025.

== Early life and Family ==
He was a student of South Point School for his high school years, and graduated in bioscience from Asutosh College. Before getting his first job in GlaxoSmithKline Pharmaceuticals in 1996, he obtained a diploma in marketing and sales management from Bharatiya Vidya Bhavan.

Bhaswar's great-grandfather, the late Bhimchandra Chatterjee, though an electrical engineer, was the architect of the Benares Hindu university (on insistence of the late Madan Mohan Malviya). His Elements of applied electricity books were in circulation a few years back. He was the Head of the Department of Electrical Engineering at Benaras Hindu University in 1936. Indian actors Devi Mukherjee and Gautam Mukherjee were the paternal uncles of his mother Aparna Chatterjee.

== Career ==
Some of the major films he acted were The Legend of Bhagat Singh,Aalo,Ballygunge Court,Aamar Prithibi,Royal Bengal Rahasya,Jekhane Bhooter Bhoy,Onyo Opaala and Mahalaya.Superhit daily soaps featuring Chattopadhyay which garnered high "TRPs" (Note: TRPs are "Television Ratings Points", a viewing audience metric used in India.) (ratings) are Joy Baba Loknath, Shree Krishna Bhakto Meera, as well as:

- Janmobhumi
- Ek Akasher Niche
- Sonar Horin
- Maa....Tomay Chara Ghum Ashena (Maa)
- Agnipariksha
- Ishti Kutum
- Keya Patar Nouko
- Bhakter Bhogobaan Shri Krishna
- O m Sai Ram
- Binni Dhaner Khoi
- Kache Aye Shoi
- Potol Kumar Gaanwala
- Karunamoyee Rani Rashmoni
- Advocate Anjali Awasthi
- Professor Bidya Banerjee
- Tilottama

which is being aired on Star Plus.

Bhaswar also is being active on ott platforms like Hoichoi, he did the successful Paap season 1&2 and Six and The Adventures of Gogol for Addatimes. His next ott release is Roktokarobi for Zee5 streaming from 3 February. Bhaswar played Ajit for the super successful Byomkesh O Pinjrapol for Hoichoi. He worked in season 2 of the web series Sampurna. On 20 April his first Hindi Webseries Tooth Pari When love bites started streaming on Netflix.

== Acting credits ==
=== Films ===
- The Legend of Bhagat Singh (2002)
- Alo (2003)
- Raj Mahal (2005)
- Rabibarer Bikalbel (2006)
- Shakal Sandhya (2006)
- Ballygunge Court (2007)
- Krishnakanter Will (2007)
- Ratbhor (2007)
- Blood (2008)
- Chirosathi (2008)
- Eti (2008)
- Takkar (2008)
- Royal Bengal Rahasya (2011)
- Teen Tanaya (2011)
- Chupkatha (2012)
- Jekhane Bhooter Bhoy (2012)
- Shudhu Tomake Chai (2012)
- Namte Namte (2013)
- Bhoot Bhooturey Samuddurey (2014)
- Gogoler Kirti (2014)
- Abby Sen (2015)
- Amar Prithivi (2015)
- Bhrasto Taara (2015)
- Binodoner Du Adhyay (2015)
- Goraa (2015)
- Onnyo Apola (2015)
- Manabpremi Mahapurush (2016)
- Adhunik (2017)
- Comrade (2017)
- Tumi Robe Nirobe (2017)
- Aha Re (2019)
- Bobbyr Bondhura (2019)
- Mahalaya (2019)
- Micchil (2020)
- Mahanagar theke Doore (2023)
- Naishabdo (2024)
- Amar Labongolata (2024)

=== Television ===
- Ek Akasher Niche (2002–2005)
- Agnipariksha (2008)
- Maa....Tomay Chara Ghum Ashena (Maa) (2009–2014)
- Potol Kumar Gaanwala (2015–2017)
- Jai Kali Kalkattawali (2017–2019)
- Binni Dhaner Khoi (2009)
- Ishti Kutum (2011 - 2015)
- Keya Patar Nouko (2011)
- Kache Aye Shoi (2012)
- Bhakter Bhagaban Shri Krishna (2017)
- Karunamoyee Rani Rashmoni (2019–2021)
- Joy Baba Loknath (2019)
- Shree Krishna Bhakto Meera (2021)
- Gouri Elo (2022)
- Godhuli Alap (2022)
- Geeta LL.B (2023–2025)
- Jogomaya (2024)
- Advocate Anjali Awasthi (2024–present)
- Professor Bidya Banerjee (2025–present)
- Besh Korechi Prem Korechi (2025–2026)
- Tilottama (2026–Present)

== Philanthropy ==
Bhaswar Chatterjee runs an NGO, "Aparna Foundation" in his mother's name, which assists the poor and needy. The foundation started collecting used clothes and accessories and distributed them to different parts of Kolkata and its outskirts. Later in 2021 during pandemic, it worked extensively in Kolkata where it fed the pavement dwellers for continuous 22 days along with Puri, Katra and specially Kashmir.The Ngo supplied a month's ration to ghorawalas and pitthuwalas of Vaishnodevi Temple, to the houseboat caretakers in Srinagar, helped in marriage of a Kashmiri girl, build a house for a poor family. It also helps a number of girl children with studies in Kashmir.
