= Haranath Chakraborty =

Indian film director

- Born: 1 January 1959 (age 67); Calcutta, West Bengal , India
- Occupations: Film director, screenplay writer
- Known for: Raja Rani Badsha; Sangharsha (1995 film); Sathi (2002 film); Sangee; Nater Guru; Sasurbari Zindabad; Pratibad; Tulkalam; Swapno; Cholo Paltai

Haranath Chakraborty (Bengali: হরনাথ চক্রবর্তী) is an Indian Bengali film director. He made his directorial debut with "Mangaldeep" (1989). Many of his movies have been critically acclaimed and enjoyed commercial success.

== Awards ==
- Sathi (2002) won the Bengal Film Journalists' Association – Best Clean & Entertainment Film Award.
- Chakraborty's film, Ganrakal (2004) won the Bengal Film Journalists' Association – Best Clean & Entertainment Film Award.
- Mahanayak Samman award (2024) is Received by the Ministry of Information & Cultural Affairs of West Bengal for Best Director ( Contribution to Bengali Movies)

== Filmography ==
Denotes films that have not yet been released

Year	Film	Actor	Notes
1989	Mangaldeep	Ranjit Mallick, Tapas Paul, Satabdi Roy, Anup Kumar, Soham Chakraborty	
1991	Nabab	Ranjit Mallick, Anup Kumar, Utpal Dutta, Sandhya Roy	
1995	Sangharsha	Ranjit Mallick, Tapas Paul, Prosenjit Chatterjee, Laboni Sarkar, Manoj Mitra	
1996	Bidroho	Ashok Kumar, Prosenjit Chatterjee, Ranjit Mallick, Satabdi Roy	
1996	Mahan	Victor Banerjee, Ranjit Mallick, Chumki Chowdhury, Biplab Chatterjee	
1997	Ajker Santan	Tapas Paul, Prosenjit Chatterjee, Ranjit Mallick, Satabdi Roy	
1998	Raja Rani Badsha	Shakil Khan, Satabdi Roy, Santu Mukhopadhyay, Samit Bhanja	
1998	Ranokhetro	Prosenjit Chatterjee, Satabdi Roy, Ranjit Mallick	
1999	Dai Daitya	Prosenjit Chatterjee, Rituparna Sengupta, Indrani Haldar, Ranjit Mallick	
2000	Sasurbari Zindabad	Prosenjit Chatterjee, Rituparna Sengupta, Ranjit Mallick, Anamika Saha	
2000	Aasroy	Prosenjit Chatterjee, Rituparna Sengupta, Deepankar De, Laboni Sarkar	
2001	Pratibad	Prosenjit Chatterjee, Arpita Pal, Ranjit Mallick, Laboni Sarkar	
2001	Dada Thakur	Firdous Ahmed, Ranjit Mallick, Victor Banerjee, Arpita Pal	
2002	Sathi	Jeet, Priyanka Trivedi, Ranjit Mallick, Anamika Saha	
2003	Sangee	Jeet, Ranjit Mallick, Priyanka Trivedi, Silajit Majumder	
2003	Nater Guru	Jeet, Koel Mallick, Ranjit Mallick, Moushmi Chatterjee	
2004	Gyarakal	Prosenjit Chatterjee, Rachana Banerjee, Jisshu Sengupta, Soumili Biswas	
2004	Surya	Prosenjit Chatterjee, Anu Chowdhury, Arunima Ghosh, Ranjit Mallick	
2005	Sangram	Prosenjit Chatterjee, Jisshu Sengupta, Ranjit Mallick, Deepankar De	
2005	Raju Uncle	Prosenjit Chatterjee, Sayantani Ghosh, Ranjit Mallick, Rajesh Sharma	
2006	Refugee	Prosenjit Chatterjee, Rambha, Rajesh Sharma, Rudranil Ghosh	
2006	Swapno	Prosenjit Chatterjee, Sayantani Ghosh, Jishu Sengupta, Abhishek Chatterjee	
2007	Nabab Nandini	Hiran Chatterjee, Koel Mallick, Ranjit Mallick, Sandhya Ray	
2007	Tulkalam	Mithun Chakraborty, Rachana Banerjee, Hara Patnaik, Rajatava Dutta	
2008	Bajimat	Soham Chakraborty, Subhashree Ganguly, Ranjit Mallick, Rajatava Dutta	
2008	Chirosathi	Hiran Chatterjee, Koel Mallick, Dipankar De	
2009	Maa Amar Maa	Hiran Chatterjee, Debesh Roy Chowdhury, Dipanwita, Ranjit Mallick, Sandhya Roy	
2010	Jor Jar Muluk Tar	Prosenjit Chatterjee, Rudranil Ghosh, Megha, Raaj Rajesh Chatterjee	
2011	Cholo Paltai	Prosenjit Chatterjee, Aryann Bhowmik, Tathoi Deb, Rajatava Dutta	
2012	Chhayamoy	Gaurav Chakraborty, Sabyasachi Chakrabarty, Deepankar De, Paran Bandopadhyay	
2013	Amar Bodyguard	Pratik Sen, Tapas Paul, Kanchan Mullick, Riddhima Ghosh	
2016	Amar Prem	Gaurab Roy Chowdhary, Antasheela Ghosh, Megha Chowdhary, Saurav Chakraborti	
2018	Dharasnan	Adhiraj Ganguly, Kanchan Mullick, Rituparna Sengupta	
2018	Bagh Bandi Khela	Jeet, Sayantika Banerjee, Soham Chakraborty, Srabanti Chatterjee, Prosenjit Chatterjee, Rittika Sen	
2019	Bhootchakra Pvt. Ltd.	Soham Chakraborty, Srabanti Chatterjee, Bonny Sengupta, Gourav Chakraborty, Rittika Sen	
2023	Daal Baati Churma	Bonny Sengupta, Koushani Mukherjee, Kharaj Mukherjee, Rajatava Dutta, Srijita Dona Chakraborty	
2023	Tarokar Mrityu	Ritwick Chakraborty, Ranjit Mallick, Parno Mitra	
2023	Oh! Lovely	Rajnandini Paul, Madan Mitra, Kharaj Mukherjee, Laboni Sarkar, Dron Mukherjee, Kaushik Bhattacharya, Buddhadeb Bhattacharya, Tapati Munsi, Mrinmoy Das	
