= Sreyasri Roy =

Bengali Television Actress

- Born: 12 September 2001 (age 24); Kolkata
- Citizenship: Indian
- Occupation: Actress
- Notable work: Bhanumotir Khel
- Height: 5 ft 8 in (173 cm)

Sreyasri Roy is an Indian actress who works in Bengali television industry. Her notable works include: Run Rony Run, Mangal Chandi, and Bhanumotir Khel.

== Television ==
Year	Title	Role	Channel
2016–2017	Run Rony Run	Rony	Aakash Aath
2018–2019	Bhanumotir Khel	Bhanumoti	Zee Bangla
2019–2020	Mangal Chandi	Lagana	Colors Bangla
2022–2024	Saathi	Priyanka	Sun Bangla

=== Mahalaya ===
Year	Title	Role	Channel
2018	Shaktirupeno	Yogadhya	Zee Bangla
