= Cholo Paltai =

Chalo Paltai
- Theatrical release poster
- Directed by: Haranath Chakraborty
- Written by: N. K. Salil
- Screenplay by: N.K. Salil
- Story by: Mahesh Manjrekar
- Based on: Shikshanachya Aaicha Gho
- Produced by: Mahendra Soni; Shrikant Mohta
- Starring: Prosenjit Chatterjee; Aryann Bhowmik; Tathoi Deb
- Cinematography: Soumik Haldar
- Edited by: Rabiranjan Moitra
- Music by: Anupam Roy
- Production company: Shree Venkatesh Films
- Release date: 4 March 2011 (Kolkata)
- Country: India
- Language: Bengali

Cholo Paltai (transl. Let's Change) is a 2011 Indian Bengali-language social problem sports drama film co-written and directed by Haranath Chakraborty. Produced by Shrikant Mohta and Mahendra Soni under the banner of Shree Venkatesh Films, it stars Prosenjit Chatterjee and Aryann Bhowmik in the lead roles, playing the roles of father and son respectively. It is based on the lives and desires of the present generation children. Cholo Paltai released on 4 March 2011.

== Plot ==
The film revolves around the relationship between a father and a son. Subhomoy Chatterjee, a widower, lives with his two children- Gourav and Munni. Though poor in academics, Gourav loves cricket as a passion and is extremely talented in it, he is appreciated by everyone for his excellence in Cricket. Gourav wants to become a Professional cricketer in the future and play for Indian Cricket Team, which only results in his father opposing his dreams, whose wish is to see his son flourish as an engineer or a doctor. Gourav failed in the school pre-board exams and as a result, his principal did not allow him to sit for Madhyamik unless he scored 75% grades required for Main Board Exams. Heartbroken by this, Subhomoy pleaded with the principal to give him 5 days, during which Gourav would prosper in his studies and produce the required results. But things remain the same.

One day, a violent clash occurred between Gourav and Subhomoy, as Gourav decides not to sit for the exam, raged by this Subhomoy destroys his cricket bat threatening to him, Gourav retaliates he will continue to play come what may and in fury, Subhamoy struck Gourav, to which he fell and his head got a severe injury after getting hit by a bed. He became unconscious and was immediately taken to hospital, where the doctors reported that he had entered into a coma. Following this Doctors inform the Police and get Subhomoy arrested on charges of physical assault, who gets out of prison thanks to his neighbor.

Subhomoy, who was deeply hurt by this incident, changed his thoughts and started protesting against the educational system of the state, which pressured children's minds and took away all the freedom needed to enjoy their childhood. He states his arguments on News TV and soon becomes a local hero and the voice of thousands of common people. But the government authorities took no notice of him. Therefore, Subhomoy hatches a plan to directly talk to the Chief Minister. He ties a bomb (which later turns out to be a fake model made by him and his daughter Munni) to his body and manages to enter the CM's office. He impressed the CM with his lecture on the disadvantages of the modern-day education structure, to which the CM replied that he agreed that there is a need for change and government will try to achieve it. The film ends as the doctors perform an operation on Gourav which turns out to be successful, and he returns as a cricketer, hitting a century in his first cricket match.

== Cast ==
- Prosenjit Chatterjee as Subhomoy
- Aryann Bhowmik as Gourav
- Tathoi Deb as Munni
- Rajatava Dutta as Imraan bhai
- Mouli Ganguly as Malini
- Debranjan Nag as Subhomoy's neighbour
- B. D. Mukherjee as Chief Minister of West Bengal
- Sambaran Banerjee as Himself (Cricket coach)
- Supriyo Dutta as police officer
- Jagannath Guha as a teacher (special appearance)

== Soundtrack ==
Chalo Paltai

Soundtrack album by Anupam Roy
- Released: 2011
- Recorded: 2010
- Studio: Shree Venkatesh Films
- Genre: Feature film soundtrack
- Label: SVF
- Producers: Mahendra Soni, Shrikant Mohta

Singles from Chalo Paltai
- 1. "Class Room" Released: 4 Feb 2011; 2. "Bhul Korechi" Released: 12 Feb 2011; 3. "Bariye Dao" Released: 19 Feb 2011

All music is composed by Anupam Roy.

No.	Title	Lyrics	Singer	Length
1.	"Class Room - Children Version"	Anupam Roy	Rahul, Adrita, Swaralipi, Dipamala	4:27
2.	"Bhul Korechi"	Anupam Roy	Raghav Chatterjee	4:27
3.	"Bariye Dao"	Anupam Roy	Anupam Roy	4:14
4.	"Class Room"		Anupam Roy	4:27
5.	"Chalo Paltai"		Sayak Bandopadhyay	4:04
