= Bhanumotir Khel =

Bengali television soap opera

- Genre: Drama; Supernatural; Romance; Magic
- Created by: Subrata Roy
- Developed by: Ashrunu Maitra
- Written by: Dialogues; Rupa Banerjee; Subrata Das Sharma
- Story by: Saswati Ghosh
- Directed by: Ayon Sengupta
- Starring: Sreyasri Roy; Rubel Das; Madhubani Ghosh; Tanisha
- Composer: Mrinal Bhattacharya
- Country of origin: India
- Original language: Bengali
- No. of episodes: 412

Production
- Executive producer: Krishanu Ganguly
- Producer: Subrata Roy
- Production location: Kolkata
- Cinematography: Saswati Ghosh
- Running time: 22 minutes
- Production company: Subrata Roy Productions

Original release
- Network: Zee Bangla
- Release: 8 January 2018 – 14 June 2019

Bhanumotir Khel is a Bengali television soap opera that premiered on 8 January 2018 and aired on Zee Bangla. Produced by Subrata Roy, it starred Sreyasri Roy and Surya Rubel Das. It replaced Baksho Bodol. This show went off air on 14 June 2019, and in its place Soudaminir Sonsar started from 17 June 2019.

== Plot ==
Currently in the story of Bhanumotir Khel, after an air crash, Meghraj and Bhanumoti are located in two separated spaces. Their daughter Bhelki is growing up with Bhanumoti, Bhelki is also a street magician who is taking care of her ailing mother and fighting against all odds. Accidentally, Bhelki meets Meghraj several times not knowing that she is actually his daughter. The main antagonist Mohini Sarkar, impressed with the magic of Bhelki, pays a lot of money to take Bhelki to their house Jaadumahal. Just before that day she treats Bhelki and her mother in a renowned hotel in the city where incidentally Meghraj and Ahona (Megh's secretary) also comes for dinner. Will Meghraj meet Bhanumoti?

== Cast ==
=== Main ===
- Sreyasri Roy as Bhanumoti Sarkar
- Surya Rubel Das as Meghraj Sarkar
- Tanisha Ganguly as Bhelki, Bhanu's daughter

=== Recurring ===
- Debaparna Chakraborty as Maya
- Rupsa Chatterjee as Mohini
- Arindam Ganguly as Jadoo Samrat / Mahendra Sarkar
- Piyali Mitra as Kumud Sarkar, Meghraj's mother
- Rohit Mukherjee as Meghraj's Uncle / Upen
- Adrija Mukherjee as Bhanumoti's Cousin / Fultushi
- Pradip Dhar as Kadam
- Saugata Bandyopadhyay as Meghraj's cousin / Utpal
- Moumita Gupta as Amba / Maya, Mohini's mother
- Pritha Bandyopadhyay as Meghraj's Aunt / Uma
- Rajib Banerjee as late Bhanumoti's Father / Jonardon
- Sanjuktaa Roy Chowdhury as Bhanumoti's mother / Kanchana / Christina
- Jagriti Gowsami as Meghraj's sister-in law / Jaya
- Sourav Chatterjee as Maya's Husband / Keshab
- Deerghoi Paul as Koli
- Mafin Chakraborty as Nikita
- Madhubani Goswami as Ahana
- Mita Chatterjee as Ranga Pishi
- Neil Chatterjee as Kumar Bahdur
