= Bagh Bondi Khela (TV series) =

Bengali television supernatural soap opera

- Genre: Drama; Supernatural; Horror
- Created by: Shree Venkatesh Films
- Directed by: Swarnedu Samadder
- Creative director: Sahana
- Presented by: SVF Entertainment
- Starring: Ishani Das; Surya Rubel Das; Rukma Roy
- Country of origin: India
- Original language: Bengali
- No. of episodes: 80

Production
- Producers: Shrikant Mohta; Mahendra Soni
- Production location: Kolkata
- Running time: 22 minutes
- Production company: Shree Venkatesh Films

Original release
- Network: Zee Bangla
- Release: 6 January – 27 March 2020

Bagh Bondi Khela is an Indian Bengali television supernatural soap opera that premiered on 6 January 2020 and aired on Bengali GEC Zee Bangla. The show starred Rubel Das and Ishani Das in lead roles and Rukma Roy as the main antagonist.

== Cast ==
=== Main ===
- Ishani Das as Raya sen
- Surya Rubel Das as Siddharta sen

=== Recurring ===
- Rukma Roy as Brinda
- Bodhisattwa Majumdar as angsu sen, Siddhartha's father
- Nandini Chatterjee as Rohini- Siddhartha's mother
- Suchismita Chowdhury as Nandini- Brinda's mother, Rohini's friend
- Basanti Chatterjee as Siddhartha's grandmother
- Animesh Bhaduri as Akash
- Twarita Chatterjee as Sonia
- Poushmita Goswami as Akash's mother
- Deerghoi Paul as Jinia
- Ratan Sarkhel as Raya's father
- Kaushiki Guha as Raya's mother
- Sananda Basak as Rakha
- Kanchana Moitra as Raya's aunt
- Aemila Sadhukhan as Pola
- Swagata Mukherjee as Raya's well wiser
