= Jaalbandi =

2022 Indian Bengali-language film by Pijush Saha

- Directed by: Pijush Saha
- Written by: Samaresh Majumdar (story)
- Produced by: Pijush Saha
- Starring: Prince Prachurya; Payel Sarkar; Darshana Banik; June Malia; Pampa Saha; Dipankar De; Kharaj Mukherjee
- Cinematography: Gopi Bhagat
- Edited by: Pronoy Dasgupta
- Music by: Amit, Ishan
- Production company: Prince Entertainment P4
- Release date: 17 June 2022
- Country: India
- Language: Bengali

Jaalbandi is a 2022 Indian Bengali-language action thriller film directed by Pijush Saha. This film was Pijush Saha's son Prince Prachurya's Tollywood debut film. The film is based on the novel Jaalbandi by Samaresh Majumdar. The film also features Payel Sarkar, Darshana Banik, Pampi Saha, June Malia, Dipankar De, and Kharaj Mukherjee. Gopi Bhagat is the director of photography and Amit-Ishan is in charge of music.

The film was released on 17 June 2022.

== Cast ==
- Prince Prachurya as Anish
- Payel Sarkar
- Darshana Banik
- June Malia
- Dipankar De
- Pampa Saha (Pampi)
- Ronojoy Bishnu
- Pushpita Mukherjee
- Palash Ganguly
- Parthasarathi Banerjee
- Kharaj Mukherjee

== Soundtrack ==
Jaalbandi

Soundtrack album by Amit-Ishan
- Released: 2022
- Genre: Film soundtrack
- Length: 10:55
- Language: Bengali
- Label: Prince Entertainment P4

Piya Jaago sung by Ishan Mitra was the most popular song of this film. Bangla news, latest bengali news, news in bangla, বাংলা নিউজ – ht bangla | Hindustan Times Bangla was written by Ritam Sen.

Track listing
No.	Title	Singer(s)	Length
1.	"Bumper Policy"	Nakash Aziz	2:37
2.	"Piya Jaago"	Ishan Mitra	4:10
3.	"Piya Jaago (Unplugged)"	Ishan Mitra	4:08
Total length:			10:55

== Reception ==
Manoj L of Cine Talkers opined that "Director Pijush Saha’s storytelling skills have always been remarkable. Pijush Saha has to be truly applauded for coming out of the kind of commercial movies that have been going on for the last few years and for making such a great movie". A critic from Dainik Statesman also reviewed the film.
