= Alo (film) =

- Directed by: Tarun Majumder
- Screenplay by: Tarun Majumder
- Based on: Kinnordol by Bibhutibhushan Bandopadhyay
- Starring: Rituparna Sengupta; Abhishek Chatterjee; Soumili Biswas; Bhaswar Chatterjee; Bharati Devi; Gyanesh Mukherjee
- Music by: Arundhati Holme Chowdhury; Shibaji Chatterjee
- Release date: 28 November 2003 (India)
- Country: India
- Language: Bengali

Alo (transl. The Light) is a 2003 Bengali family drama film directed by Tarun Majumder and starring Rituparna Sengupta. The story is based on a short story Kinnardal by Bibhutibhushan Bandopadhyay.

The film was nominated for a National Award in the category "Best Film Providing Wholesome Family Entertainment". It was Third highest grossing Bengali movie in 2003. Translated into French by Anita Basu Mallick.

== Plot ==
Alo is an educated Kolkata based woman who comes to her husband's ancestral village after marriage. Her husband Shuvo is a teacher who works in Kolkata. Alo starts living with the poverty stricken villagers. Alo enlightens their lifestyle, morally as well as culturally. She becomes an idol of adoration. Alo gets devastated on learning about Pintu's death. She also dies while giving birth to her daughter but literally stands up to the meaning of her name Alo, which is light or ray of hope. The women of the village take the responsibility of the girl's upbringing.

== Cast ==
- Rituparna Sengupta as Alo Chowdhury
- Kunal Mitra as Shubhankar Chatterjee aka Subho (Professor)
- Bhaswar Chatterjee as Himu (Subho's younger brother)
- Abhishek Chatterjee as Binod Gupta aka Binu da (Alo's brother-in-law)
- Nayana Das as Meera aka Ranga di (Alo's elder sister/Binu's wife)
- Soumili Biswas as Roma (Alo's sister)
- Basanti Chatterjee as No-khurima
- Manasi Sinha
- Angana Roy as Alo's daughter
- Bharati Devi
- Rita Dutta Chakraborty as Sodu
- Pushpita Mukherjee as Renu
- Maitryee Mitra as Shantilata aka Shanti
- Shraboni Bonik

== Awards ==
- The film was nominated for a National Award in the category "Best Film Providing Wholesome Family Entertainment".
- Won the Anandalok Puraskar in 2004
- Won the most outstanding work of the year in Bengal Film Journalists' Association Awards, 2004.
- Special Screening in Hyderabad Bengali Film Festival, 2018
