= Raja Rani Badsha =

- Directed by: Haranath Chakraborty
- Starring: Shakil Khan; Santu Mukhopadhyay; Samit Bhanja; Nimu Bhowmik; Ahmed Sarif; Gita Dey; Arun Bandyopadhyay; Arindam Ganguly; Hasan Bairagi; Miss. Mona Dutta; Satabdi Roy
- Music by: Babul Bose
- Release date: 1998
- Running time: 136 min.
- Countries: Bangladesh; India
- Language: Bengali

Raja Rani Badsha (Bengali: রাজা রানী বাদশা) is a 1998 Indo-Bangladesh joint production Bengali film directed by Haranath Chakraborty and produced under the banner of Lakshmi Chitram.The film's music was composed by Babul Bose.

== Plot ==
Rani, a little girl, escapes her evil uncle when he tries to kill her family. Later, she meets Joy and Sundari who help her avenge her parents' death but she is shocked when she sees her lookalike.

== Cast ==
- Shakil Khan
- Satabdi Roy
- Santu Mukhopadhyay
- Samit Bhanja
- Nimu Bhowmik
- Ahmed Sarif
- MONA DUTTA
- Gita Dey
