= Sarbojaya =

Indian Bengali television series

- Genre: Drama
- Created by: Blues Productions
- Developed by: Blues Productions
- Screenplay by: Snehasish Chakraborty
- Story by: Snehasish Chakraborty
- Directed by: Anup Chakraborty
- Creative director: Snehasish Chakraborty
- Starring: Debasree Roy; Kushal Chakraborty; Sanghamitra Talukdar
- Theme music composer: Chandrika
- Opening theme: "Sarbojaya"
- Composer: Snehasish Chakraborty
- Country of origin: India
- Original language: Bengali
- No. of episodes: 241

Production
- Executive producers: Runa & Sudip (Blues Productions); Paromita & Urbish Bose (Zee Bangla)
- Producer: Snehasish Chakraborty
- Cinematography: Debabrata Mallick
- Editor: Bapon Pramanik
- Camera setup: Multi-camera
- Running time: 22 minutes
- Production company: Blues Productions

Original release
- Network: Zee Bangla
- Release: 9 August 2021 – 14 May 2022

Sarbojaya is a 2021 Indian Bengali language drama television series which premiered on 9 August 2021 on Bengali general entertainment channel Zee Bangla. The show is produced by Snehasish Chakraborty of Blues Productions and stars Debasree Roy, Kushal Chakraborty and Sanghamitra Talukdar. This show marked the comeback of Debashree Roy in the television industry after 25 years. The show went off air on 14 May 2022 due to low viewership and was replaced by Khelna Bari.

== Plot ==
Sarbojaya (or Jaya) belongs from a simple middle-class family in North Kolkata. She married Sanjay, a rich businessman with a gold heart. After her marriage she is humiliated by her-in-laws for her middle class attitude but is always supported by her husband and her daughter. Sarbojoya loves dancing, reading Rabindranth Tagore's novels but she is prevented from doing these.

== Cast ==
=== Main ===
- Debasree Roy as Sarbojaya Chowdhury aka Jaya: Sanjay's wife, Sara's mother and Zishan's mother-in-law
- Kushal Chakraborty as Sanjay Chowdhury: a successful businessman; Sarbojoya's husband, Sara's father and Zishan's father-in-law
- Sanghamitra Talukder as Sara Sen (née Chowdhury): Sarbojaya and Sanjay's daughter, Zishan's wife
- Pronnoy Chandra as Zishan Sen: a cricketer, Sara's husband

=== Recurring ===
- Moumita Gupta as Madhura Chowdhury (née Roy): Goutam's wife, Rajib, Yuvaan and Jinda's mother and Sarbojoya's elder sister-in-law
- Supriyo Dutta as Goutam Chowdhury: Sanjay's elder brother; Madhura's husband, Rajib, Yuvaan and Jinda's father and Sarbojoya's elder brother-in-law
- Swagata Mukherjee as Manini Chowdhury: Kushan's wife, Rakha and Pragya's mother and Sarbojoya's younger sister-in-law
- Rana Mitra as Kushan Chowdhury: Sanjay's younger brother; Manini's husband, Rakha and Pragya's father and Sarbojoya's younger brother-in-law
- Manoj Ojha as Rajib Chowdhury: Darshana's husband and Madhura's elder son
- Mahua Halder as Darshana Chowdhury: Rajib's wife and Madhura's daughter-in-law
- Aditya Chowdhury as Yuvaan Chowdhury: Madhura's younger son and Urvi's lover
- Shobhana Bhunia as Jinda Chowdhury: Madhura's daughter
- Roshni Ghosh as Rakha Chowdhury: Manini and Kushan's daughter
- Payel Tarafdar as Pragya Chowdhury: Manini and Kushan's daughter
- Debjoy Mallick as Monoshij Roy: Madhura's brother
- Rupsha Chatterjee as Urvi: Yuvaan's lover.
- Mayukh Chatterjee as Makhon: Zishan's friend
- Joy Badlani as Mr. Bindra: the Chowdhury family's neighbour
- Dipankar De as Bogola: Jaya's Uncle
- Susmita Chanda as Piu Sen: Sanjay's office colleague and Kushan's lover
- Debjani Chattopadhyay as Swarnachapa Karmakar: Claims to be Sanjay's wife
- Mallika Banerjee as Atryee: Zishan's aunt
- Jagriti Goswami as Rathi
- Judhajit Banerjee as Ajit Poddar

== Reception ==
The show obtained third spot of the TRP leaderboard after debut on Bengali television from its first week.

== Adaptations ==
Language	Title	Original release	Network(s)	Last aired	Notes
Odia	Sarbajita Anu ସର୍ବଜିତା ଅନୁ	14 March 2022	Zee Sarthak	31 December 2022	Remake
