= Rubel Das =

Indian Bengali actor (born 1990)

Surya Rubel Das
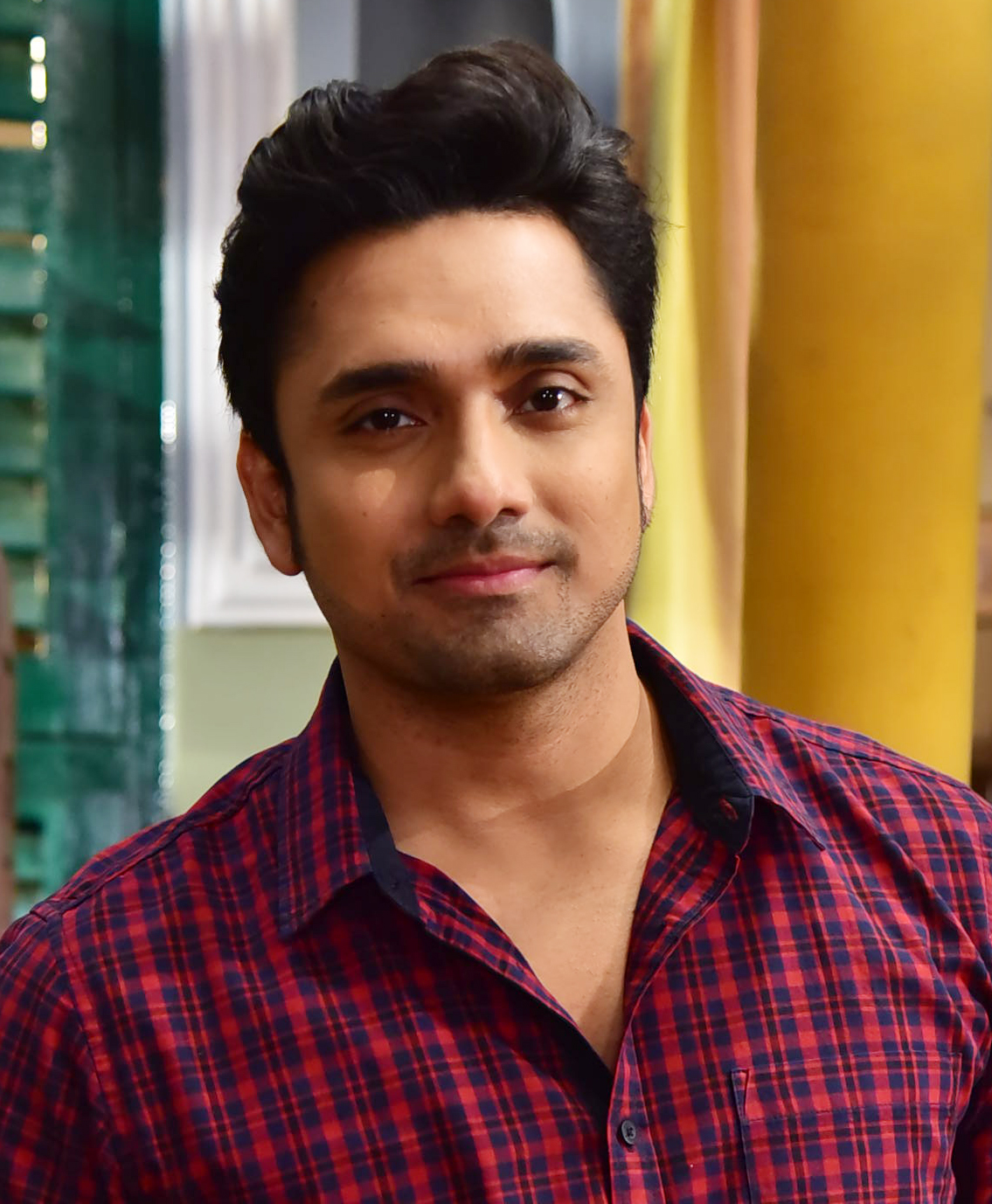
- Born: 5 September 1990 (age 36); Barasat, West Bengal, India
- Education: Acharya Prafulla Chandra College
- Occupation: Actor
- Years active: 2016–present
- Spouse: Shweta Bhattacharya (m. 2025)

Surya Rubel Das (born 5 September 1990) is an Indian actor who has appeared in Bengali films and television serials. He made his acting debut with the Bengali film Beparoyaa. The Calcutta Times voted him as one of the top 10 Most Desirable Men in 2018.

== Early life and education ==
Rubel Das was born in Barasat. He studied at Barasat Mahatma Gandhi Memorial High School and graduated from Acharya Prafulla Chandra College. Before becoming an actor, he was a stage dancer and choreographer; and he became known by Dance Bangla Dance.

== Personal life ==
He married his Jamuna Dhaki serial co actress Shweta Bhattacharya on 19 January 2025. They fell in love while doing the show and after the show ended, they confessed their love to each other in 2022.

== Acting career ==
Das made his acting career debut with Beparoyaa, a film directed by Pijush Saha in 2016, where Papri Ghosh was his co-star. Then he acted in Bhanumotir Khel. His second film, Tui Amar Rani, was released in 2019. This film was also directed by Pijush Saha. It was an India Bangladesh joint venture film. He played the lead in Bagh Bandi Khela.

== Filmography and television ==
=== Films ===
Year	Film	Role
2016	Beparoyaa	Surya
2019	Tui Amar Rani	Raja
2019	Bancharamer Bagan Bari	Naren

=== Television ===
Year	Show	Channels	Role	Production company
2018–2019	Bhanumotir Khel	Zee Bangla	Mehgraj Sarkar	Subrata Roy Productions
2019	Thakumar Jhuli	Star Jalsha	Kanchan Kumar (Episodic Role)	Star Jalsha Productions
2020	Bagh Bondi Khela	Zee Bangla	Siddhartha	Shree Venkatesh Films
2020–2022	Jamuna Dhaki	Zee Bangla	Sangeet Roy	Blues Production
2022–2025	Neem Phooler Madhu	Zee Bangla	Srijan Dutta	Zee Bangla Productions
2025–2026	Tui Amar Hero	Zee Bangla	Superstar Shakyajeet Chatterjee	Long Journey Entertainment

=== Mahalaya ===
Year	Serial	Role	Network	Ref.
2017	Rupang Dehi Jayang Dehi	Mahadev	Zee Bangla	
2021	Nanarupe Mahamaya	Mahadev	Zee Bangla	
2022	Singhobahini Trinayani	Mahadev	Zee Bangla	
2025	Jago Maa Jago Durga	Mahisasur	Zee Bangla	
2026	Asubhonashini Trinayani	Mahadev	Zee Bangla	

== Awards ==
Year	Award	Category	Character	Film/TV show
2021	Zee Bangla Sonar Sansar Awards 2021	Priyo Bor	Songeet	Jamuna Dhaki
2022	Zee Bangla Sonar Sansar Awards 2022	Priyo Bor	Songeet	Jamuna Dhaki
2022	Telly Adda Awards 2022	Golden Bonding	Sangeet	Jamuna Dhaki
2023	Kolkata Glitz Award	Notable Performance (Male)		
2023	Zee Bangla Sonar Sansar Awards 2023	Priyo Chele	Srijon	Neem Phooler Madhu
2024	Zee Bangla Sonar Sansar Awards 2024	Priyo Juti (with Pallavi Sharma)	Srijon-Porna	Neem Phooler Madhu
2024	Zee Bangla Sonar Sansar Awards 2024	Priyo Bor	Srijon	Neem Phooler Madhu
2024	Telly Adda Awards 2024	Most Popular Face	Srijon	Neem Phooler Madhu
2025	Zee Bangla Sonar Sansar Awards 2025	Sera Nayok	Srijon	Neem Phooler Madhu
2025	BFTA Awards 2025	Best Actor in a Leading Role (Television)	Srijon	Neem Phooler Madhu
2025	Tele Academy Awards 2025	Best Actor	Shakyajeet	Tui Amar Hero
2026	Zee Bangla Sonar Sansar Awards 2026	Priyo Bor	Shakyajeet	Tui Amar Hero
