= Joy Baba Loknath =

Indian Bengali television period drama series

- Also known as: Lokenath Baba
- Genre: Drama; Mythology
- Created by: Svf Production; Joy Dasgupta
- Developed by: Shibashis Bandopadhyay
- Written by: Sambaran Mukherjee; Anway Dutta
- Screenplay by: Smritikona Paul Roy
- Story by: Smritikona Paul Roy
- Directed by: Pavel Ghosh; Probir Ganguly; Bijoy Maji (past)
- Creative director: Aditi Ray Partha Majumder
- Presented by: Zee Bangla
- Starring: Arannyo Roychowdhury; Bhaswar Chatterjee Soumi Biswas
- Theme music composer: Devjit Roy
- Opening theme: Joy lokenath baba......
- Ending theme: Akasher kone.....
- Composer: Upali Chattopadhyay
- Country of origin: India
- Original language: Bengali
- No. of episodes: 776

Production
- Executive producers: Debashis; Bishnu; Darshana; Oindrila; Susmita; Gangotry; Abhishek; Jayanta
- Producers: Shrikant Mohta; Mahendra Soni
- Production location: Kolkata
- Cinematography: Pintu Shee
- Editor: Jishu Nath Shaibal Das Shibu Sarkar
- Camera setup: Multi camera
- Running time: 22 minutes
- Production companies: Dag Creative Media; Shree Venkatesh Films

Original release
- Network: Zee Bangla
- Release: 9 April 2018 – 4 September 2020

Joy Baba Lokenath was a Bengali daily soap opera which was premiered on Zee Bangla and digital platform Zee5. The show starred Bhaswar and Soumili in lead roles. It went off on 4 September 2020.

== Plot ==
It is a mythological story which revolves around the life of Loknath Brahmachari. This story shows how Lokenath became a great saint with the guidance of his Gurudev, Bhagwan Ganguly.

== Cast ==
- Bhaswar Chatterjee as Old Loknath
  - Souptic Chakraborty as Adult Loknath
  - Arannyo Roychowdhury as Young Loknath
- Soumili Biswas / Srabanti Mukherjee as Kamala: Loknath's mother
- Arindam Chatterjee as Ramnarayan: Loknath's father
- Rajesh Kr Chattopadhyay as Balaram: Beni Madhab's Father
- Geetashree Roy as Ma Durga
- Sohon Bandopadhyay / Achin Kumar Moitro as Acharya Bhagaban Ganguly
- Bidipta Chakraborty as Bhairavi
- Reshmi Sen as Sarbamangala aka Guruma
- Rupa Bhattacharjee as Torita
- Saugata Bandyopadhyay as Ram Prashad
- Pradip Dhar as Beni Madhab
- Rimjhim Mitra as Baro Ranimaa
- Arijit Chowdhury as Zamindar Nishikanto Roy
- Priyanka Rati Pal as Choto Rani Maa.
- Anaya Ghosh
- Gora Dhar as Trailangyaswami
- Dipanjan Bhattacharya as Aditya
- Mousumi Bhattacharya as Madhobi
- Titas Bhowmik as Sudha.
- Samrat Mukherji as Keshav Chandra
- Laboni Bhattacharjee as Hemanlini
- Swapnila Chakrabarty as Padma
- Debdut Ghosh as Nawab Alivardi Khan
- Sonali Chowdhury as Sharfunnisa Begum
- Sankar Malakar as Raghab
- Rohit Mukherjee
- Priya Malakar
