= Bibi Chowdhurani =

- Genre: Indian Soap Opera
- Story by: Sandip Chowdhury; Dialogues; Malova Majumdar
- Directed by: Debidas Bhattacharya; Sayan Dasgupta
- Starring: Arnab Banerjee; Nibedita Biswas
- Opening theme: Bibi Chowdhurani
- Ending theme: Debjit Roy
- Country of origin: India
- Original language: Bengali
- No. of seasons: 1
- No. of episodes: 96

Production
- Producers: Rajiv Mehra; Joydeep Ghosh
- Production location: Kolkata
- Running time: 21 mins approx
- Production company: One Plus One

Original release
- Network: Zee Bangla
- Release: 28 April – 16 August 2014

Related
- Kache Aye Shoi; Dwiragaman

Bibi Chowdhurani is a Bengali television serial telecast by Zee Bangla.

== Plot ==
The show was about a girl named Bibi who was a liar but ultimately the lies turned out to be beneficial for others. She is a compulsive liar. Her father is a politician. Her elder sister is to be married with a guy, so in order to rescue her elder sister she lies to her father about her sister, but she finds herself trapped in her own lies. Her father decides to get her married with the same guy. In order to avoid the marriage she lies to the guy that she is an alcohol addict, chain smoker, etc. but the guy falls in love with her as he feels that she is a pure girl.

== Cast ==
- Nibedita Biswas as Bibi
- Arnab Banerjee as Pratim
- Elfina Mukherjee as Mimi Chowdhury
- Dwaipayan Das as Niloy / Nilu
- Ambarish Bhattacharya as Manohar Chowdhury
- Lopamudra Sinha as Mandira Chowdhury
- Tanima Sen as Bibi and Mimi's Grandmother
- Sourav Chakraborty as Dibakar Chowdhury
- Animesh Bhaduri as Pratyush Mitra
- Rumpa Chatterjee as Haashi Mitra
- Runa Bandopadhyay as Surodhwani Mitra
- Shankar Chakraborty as Prabhat Mitra
- Aditya Roy as Pratik Mitra
- Twarita Chatterjee as Ranjana Mitra / Ranju
- Sarbani Chakraborty / Sayantika Basu as Shulekha Mitra
- Rajat Ganguly as Pranab Mitra
- Soham Basu Roy Chowdhury as Gogol Mitra
- Basanti Chattopadhyay as Usharaani
- Dipanwita Banerjee as Priya Mitra
