= Aamar Durga =

Indian television series

- Genre: Soap opera
- Created by: Acropoliis Entertainment Pvt. Ltd.
- Story by: Ashita Bhattacharya; Dialogues; Sayan Chowdhury
- Directed by: Babu Banik
- Creative director: Satyaki
- Starring: Sanghamitra Talukdar; Sanchaari Das; Sumantra Mukherjee; Hritojeet Chattopadhyay
- Composer: Indra (Baban)
- Country of origin: India
- Original language: Bengali
- No. of episodes: 554

Production
- Producers: Snigdha Basu; Sani Ghose Ray
- Camera setup: Multi-camera
- Running time: 22 minutes
- Production company: Acropoliis Entertainment Pvt. Ltd.

Original release
- Network: Zee Bangla
- Release: 18 January 2016 – 21 October 2017

Aamar Durga is an Indian Bengali television soap opera that premiered on 18 January 2016 on ZEE5 and Zee Bangla. Produced by Acropolis Entertainment Pvt. Ltd., it starred Sanghamitra Talukdar and Hritojeet Chattopadhyay in lead roles.

The show, set amidst a background of political corruption, has been cited as an example of increasingly diverse roles played by female characters in Bengali programming. The show was discontinued on 21 October 2017.

== Cast ==
=== Main ===
- Sanghamitra Talukder as Durga Mukherjee (née Chakraborty)- a brave girl who protests against the corrupt practices of politician Abhirup Mukherjee, Ani's wife. Later, she was elected as Chief Minister.
- Sanchari Das as Charulata Mukherjee (née Chakraborty) / Charu / Mili- Durga's elder sister, Mihir's wife
- Hritojeet Chatterjee as Anirban Mukherjee / Ani- Abhiroop's youngest son, Durga's love interest and husband
- Dhrubajyoti Sarkar as Mihir Mukherjee- Abhiroop's eldest son, Charu's love interest and husband, Durga's brother-in-law

=== Recurring ===
- Sumanta Mukherjee as Late Abhirup Mukherjee: Mihir and Riya's father; Ani's foster father a corrupt minister.
- Nandini Chatterjee as Mandira Mukherjee: Abhirup's wife, Mihir and Riya's mother;Ani's foster mother
- Arindam Banerjee as Late Ishwar Chakraborty: Charu and Durga's father.
- Maitryee Mitra as Pratima Chakraborty: Charu and Durga's mother
- Suchismita Chowdhury as Bela: Puja's mother
- Saibal Bhattacharya / Sohon Bandopadhyay as Bijoy Mukherjee: Abhirup's younger brother, Bela's husband;Puja's father
- Piyali Basu as Sucheta: a school teacher
- Ratan Sarkhel as Brojeshwar / Brojo: Ani's biological father, Abhirup's friend
- Kushal Chakraborty as Sujoy Mukherjee: Neha and Mimi's father
- Sahana Sen as Shipra: Neha and Mimi's mother
- Manishankar Banerjee as Captain
- Juiee Sarkar as Riya
- Jagriti Goswami as Puja
- Ishani Das as Neha
- Oindrila Saha as Mimi
- Deerghoi Paul as Gunjan Sen
- Runa Bandopadhyay as Deepa
- Indrajit Mazumder as Shubhomoy Bose / Shubho: Riya's former love interest
- Subhrajit Dutta as Samrat: Riya's husband
- Bikash Bhowmik as Bhabani: Samrat's father
- Judhajit Banerjee as Late Susheel Sen: Gunjan's father, Abhirup's friend.
- Kuyasha Biswas as Dalia: Charu / Durga's Friend
- Raj Bhattacharya as Dr. Anjan Sen
- Sanchari Mondal as Torsha Mitra
- Shriti Singh as Uma / Durga Governess
- Arpita Mukherjee as Bilkis: a prisoner
- Mallika Majumder as Swatilekha: Durga's coach
- Anindita Sarkar as Aradhya Sen
- Biresh Chakraborty as Late Pradesh Lahiri: a police officer, killed by Abhirup.
- Atonu Saha as Prem Majumder

== Adaptations ==
Language	Title	Original Release	Network(s)	Last aired	Notes
Bengali	Aamar Durga আমার দূর্গা	18 January 2016	Zee Bangla	21 October 2017	Original
Odia	Bijayinee ବିଜୟିନୀ	23 August 2021	Zee Sarthak	31 December 2022	Remake
