= Tulkalam =

2007 Indian Bengali film

- DVD cover of movie Tulkalam
- Directed by: Haranath Chakraborty
- Written by: Anjan Choudhury (story)
- Screenplay by: N.K. Salil (additional); Anjan Choudhury
- Produced by: Pijus Saha
- Starring: Mithun Chakraborty; Rachana Banerjee; Biplab Chattopadhyay
- Music by: Ashok Raj
- Production company: Prince Entertainment P4
- Distributed by: Prince Entertainment P4
- Release date: 13 April 2007
- Running time: 125 min.
- Country: India
- Language: Bengali

Tulkalam (trans...Danger) is a 2007 Indian Bengali-language political action thriller film directed by Haranath Chakraborty. The screenplay and story was written by Anjan Chowdhury, before his death and produced by Pijush Saha, under the banner of Prince Entertainment P4. It stars Mithun Chakraborty, Rachana Banerjee, Rajatava Dutta, Hara Patnaik, Paoli Dam and Amitabh Bhattacharya in lead roles,

== Plot ==
Inspired by the Tata-nano controversy, it plots the land scams taking place at fictional Haridebpur, where the MLA Abinash Mukherjee and his brother in law Haripada Samanta try to take over all the land of the farmers as they made a deal with the U.B company to make factories on the land. Another leader of the area, Satyabrata Roy plans to undertake the land by protesting against Mukherjee. Then all of a sudden, a mysterious man, Toofan comes to the village to dismiss the deal and to stop the dangerous situation created by the political leaders.

== Cast ==
- Mithun Chakraborty as CBI officer Tanmay Sanyal aka Toofan
- Rachana Banerjee as Gauri, Toofan's love interest
- Hara Patnaik as Avinash Mukherjee, MLA of Haridebpur
- Ashok Bhattacharya as Parimal Ghosh, farmer's leader and Panchayat party head
- Rajatava Dutta as Haripada Samanta, Avinash's brother-in-law
- Amitabh Bhattacharjee as Chhoton Shikdar
- Biplab Chatterjee as Central Minister
- Arun Bannerjee as Municipality Chairman Satyabrata Chappel
- Mrinal Mukherjee as Salim Rahman
- Anamika Saha as Banolata Shikdar
- Rajesh Sharma as Pratap Mondal, Officer in Charge of Haridebpur Police Station
- Paoli Dam as Priya Chappel
- Amitava Bhattacharya as Alam
- Ramen Roy Chowdhury as DIG
- Nimu Bhowmik as Head of U.B. group

== Soundtrack ==
The soundtrack of the film was composed by Ashok-Raj, while the dialogues were written by N.K Salil.
