= Neel Akasher Chandni =

Neel Akasher Chadni
- Poster of the film
- Directed by: Sujit Guha
- Written by: Pijush Saha (dialogues)
- Screenplay by: Somnath Bhattacharya; Tapan Bhattacharya
- Story by: Pijush Saha
- Produced by: Prince Entertainment P4
- Starring: Jeet; Koel; Jisshu
- Cinematography: Ramanna
- Edited by: M. Sushmit
- Music by: Jeet Gannguli
- Production company: Prasd Lab
- Distributed by: Prince Entertainment P4
- Release date: 7 August 2009
- Country: India
- Language: Bengali

Neel Akasher Chadni is a 2009 Bengali romantic drama film directed by Sujit Guha and produced by Pijush Saha. The film features Jeet, Koel, and Jisshu in leading roles. The film won best film in the 2010 Kalakar Awards.

== Plot ==
The plot revolves around the relationship between three characters – Neel, Akash and Chandni. Neel and Akash are childhood friends. Neel's industrialist father considers Akash as his son. Akash wants to be a singer, while Neel goes to the United States to complete his MBA. Akash and Chandni fall in love in college, and Neel falls in love with Chandni at an airport. On Chandni's birthday, her father announces her engagement with Neel in Akash's presence, who decides to sacrifice his love for his friend. Neel's father, concerned over Akash's feelings for Chandi, sends hitmen to kill him. Chandni marries Neel to fulfill her father's wishes, and Neel and Chandni go to North Bengal for their honeymoon. In North Bengal they find Anthony Gomes, who looks like Akash. Anthony admits that he is actually Akash and Neel arranges for Chandni and Akash to be married. In the marriage hall, Chandni tells Akash that she loves Neel and can't marry him. Just then, they find out that Neel had been in an accident, and they rush to the hospital. Akash gives his kidney to save Neel and dies.

== Cast ==
- Jeet as Akash/ fake Anthony Gomes
- Koel as Chandni
- Jisshu as Neel
- Ashok Bhattacharya as Neel's father
- Debika Mitra as Neel's mother
- Arun Banerjee as Chadni's father
- Anuradha Roy as Chadni's mother

== Soundtrack ==
Neel Akasher Chandni

Soundtrack album by Jeet Gannguli
- Released: 2009
- Studio: Prince Entertainment P4
- Genre: Feature film soundtrack
- Language: Bengali
- Label: Eskay Movies
- Producer: Prince Entertainment P4

Jeet Gannguli chronology
Paran Jai Jaliya Re (2009)	Neel Akasher Chandni (2009)	Keno Kichu Kotha Bolo Naa (2009)

Singles from Neel Akasher Chandni
- 1. "Chandni Chandni" Released: 4 May 2017; 2. "Ki Bhalo Lage Pia" Released: 4 May 2017; 3. "Saiyaan Saiyaan" Released: 5 May 2017; 4. "Boro Aasha Kore" Released: 5 May 2017; 5. "Bhalobasha Swapno" Released: 5 May 2017; 6. "Raat Jaye Raat Jaye" Released: 8 May 2017

All lyrics are written by Priyo Chattopadhyay, Gautam Sushmit; all music is composed by Jeet Gannguli.

Track listing
No.	Title	Singer(s)	Length
1.	"Raat Jaye Raat Jaye"	Shaan	5:04
2.	"Chandni Chandni"	Shaan	2:37
3.	"Boro Aasha Kore"	Shaan, Mahalakshmi Iyer	5:44
4.	"Ki Bhalo Lage Piya (Sad)"	Ambarish, Mahalakshmi Iyer
5.	"Ki Bhalo Lage Piya"	Shaan, Ambarish & Mahalakshmi Iyer	4:56
6.	"Bhalobasha Swapno"	Jeet Ganguly, Shaan & Mahalakshmi Iyer	4:41
7.	"Saiyaan Saiyaan"	Shaan	5:54
8.	"Saiyaan Saiyaan (Remix)"	Shaan
