= Beparoyaa =

- Directed by: Pijush Saha
- Written by: Pijush Saha
- Produced by: Pijush Saha
- Starring: Rubel Das; Papri Ghosh; Rano Joy
- Cinematography: J. Sridhar, Rajiv Sribastav, B. Satish
- Edited by: M. Susmit
- Music by: Indra, Kutty
- Production company: Prince Entertainment P4
- Release date: 15 January 2016
- Running time: 154 minutes
- Country: India
- Language: Bengali

Beparoyaa (also spelled 'Beporoya') is a Bengali commercial film directed and produced by Pijush Saha, starring new face Rubel Das, Rano Joy and Papri Ghosh in lead roles. Beparoyaa was released on 15 January 2016. This film is presented by Prince Entertainment P4. Beparoyaa is a political satire and youth-based love story. The tag line of the film is "Kori Na Kawoke paroyaa tai Ami Beparoyaa".

== Synopsis ==
Ramlal Bhakat, who is also known as "Rambabu" (Rajatava Dutta), is the topmost don of Haldia. The entire locality runs at his command. Extortion, smuggling, promoting is his monopoly. In present days his influence in politics is proactive. With his help "Prakash Saha" (Supriyo Dutta) won the election to become an MLA. Mr. Prakash Saha is now a minister, but he is a puppet under Rambabu. "Raja", the only son of Rambabu, is the worthy son of his father. Women, alcohol, and unfair students' politics are his key area. Currently Rambabu is the chairman of a municipality. He did not dare to eliminate all the people who could have been obstacles to his activities. But even SP "Barun Debnath" has been murdered by Rambabu for the same. The assassination of Barun Debnath issue was flashed in the media.

Minister Prakash Saha advised Rambabu to leave the country for abroad and to hash out the issue with Rambabu’s closest rival "Sajid Vai", who has been arrested. New appointed SP "Bharat" (Koushik Banerjee) who is very close to Prakash Saha tries to cover up the case. Young brave boy "Surya" (Rubel Das) who is under police training got entangled in various cases which dragged him into court. To avoid the situation Surys’s father deported him to Haldia at his maternal uncle’s place, where he meets "Bristi" (Papri) and falls in love with her. He proposed to Bristi, but Bristi was not ready to accept. Raja who was also inclined toward Bristi tries to get her forcefully, but Surya came to know about it and stood beside Bristi, leading into a fight between Surya and Raja. Raja was injured and went into a coma. Hearing the news Rambabu came to Haldia and got into a direct tussle with Surya. At the end Surya won the battle against Rambabu and Bristi submitted to him. M P

== Cast ==
- Rubel Das as Surya
- Papri Ghosh as Bristi
- Rajatava Dutta as Rambabu
- Supriyo Dutta as Prakash Saha
- Shantilal Mukherjee as Arun
- Kaushik Banerjee as SP Bharat
- Arun Banerjee as Professor
- Dolon Roy as Hero’s Maternal Aunt
- Ranojoy Bishnu
- Master Prayus Raj as Gablu

== Soundtrack ==
All lyrics are written by Dipankar; all music is composed by Indra, Kutty.

No.	Title	Music	Singer(s)	Length
1.	"Beparoyaa Title Track"	Indra, Kutty	Rana Mazumder	04:38
2.	"Poran Bondhua"	Indra, Kutty	Divya Kumar, Indra, Sumana Sarkar	02:57
3.	"Mutton Biryani"	Indra, Kutty	Nakash Aziz	03:02
4.	"Piya Basanti"	Indra, Kutty	Benny Dayal, Akriti Kakkar	04:42
