= Hari Ghosher Gowal =

Bengali movie

- Directed by: Subhabrata Chaterjee
- Written by: Pijush Saha
- Produced by: Pijush Saha
- Starring: Srija; Newcomers
- Cinematography: Roze Alam
- Music by: Indra
- Production company: Prince Entertainment P4
- Release date: 29 November 2019
- Country: India
- Language: Bengali

Hari Ghosher Gowal is a horror-comedy Bengali film produced by Pijush Saha and directed by Subhabrata Chaterjee, the film features newcomers and Srija in lead roles. It was released on 29 November 2019. This film, presented by Prince Entertainment P4, revolves around a boys hostel.

== Synopsis ==
The comedy flick revolves around a boys’ hostel Shri Chaitanya Adarsha Chatrabash where Hari Mohan Ghosh aka Hari Ghosh is the man in charge. However, one day Adi, a boarder of this hostel attempts suicide after being ditched by his girlfriend but a mysterious lady saves him and it all starts from here on. A series of comic errors dismantle Hari Ghosh's peaceful life.

== Cast ==
- Srija as Ishita
- Monojyoti Mukherjee as Hari Ghosh
- Parthasarathi Banerjee as Nimai
- Suman as Sam
- Utpal as Kausik

== Soundtrack ==
All lyrics are written by Rabindranath Tagore, Rivo; all music is composed by Indra and Rabindranath Tagore.

No.	Title	Lyrics	Music	Singer(s)	Length
1.	"Hari Ghosher Gowal (Title Song)"	Nilanjan Chakraborty	Indra	Indra	04: 46
2.	"Aye Chol Harai"	Rivo	Indra	Indra, Gopika	04:07
3.	"Sakhi Bhabona Kahare Bole"	Rabindranath Tagore	Indra	Jayati Chakraborty	05:52
