= Sasurbari Zindabad =

- Official VCD cover
- Directed by: Haranath Chakraborty
- Written by: Monotosh Chakraborty
- Produced by: Shrikant Mohta
- Starring: Prosenjit Chatterjee; Rituparna Sengupta; Ranjit Mallick; Anamika Saha; Subhashish Mukherjee; Tota Roy Chowdhury
- Edited by: Swapan Guha
- Music by: Babul Bose
- Production company: Shree Venkatesh Films
- Distributed by: Eskay Video Pvt. Ltd.
- Release date: 14 April 2000
- Country: India
- Language: Bengali
- Budget: ₹60–70 lakh
- Box office: ₹2.5 crore

Sasurbari Zindabad (English: Cheers for the In-laws) is a 2000 Indian Bengali-language masala film co-written and directed by Haranath Chakraborty. Produced by Shrikant Mohta and under the banner of Shree Venkatesh Films, the film stars Prosenjit Chatterjee and Rituparna Sengupta in lead roles, while Ranjit Mallick, Anamika Saha, Subhashish Mukherjee and Tota Roy Chowdhury play another pivotal roles. The film revolves around a rich girl, Rupa, escaping from her house with the help of her father to avoid being forcefully married by her mother; on the run, she falls in love with a motor mechanic, Somu, who then takes her on several adventures and tries to impress his mother-in-law.

The music of the film was composed by Babul Bose, with cinematography and editing by Swapan Guha. It ran more than 90 weeks in theatres and created a box office record by becoming the highest grossing Bengali film ever at the time. Sasurbari Zindabad marks the 6th collaboration between Prosenjit Chatterjee and Haranath Chakraborty. The song "Chokh Tule Dekho Na Ke Esechhe", sung by Babul Supriyo, was a chartbuster during its release. The movie is a remake of 1990 Hindi movie Jamai Raja which itself was a remake of 1989 Telugu movie Attaku Yamudu Ammayiki Mogudu.

== Plot ==
Mrs. Binodini Roy, a renowned industrialist, wants to marry off her elder daughter Rupa to her business partner's son (Majumdar). Rupa is against the marriage and hence escapes from her house with the help of her father. On the way to her uncle's house in Narayanpur, a cabbie tries to rob her of her belongings. But she is saved by a handsome motor-mechanic named Somu. Somu takes her to her uncle's house, and it is revealed that he is one of her uncle's acquaintances. Gradually, Rupa and Somu grow close to each other. One day they have a heated argument on her modern dressing, but it is precisely after this that they realize their love for each other. They make up and even get secretly married without informing Rupa's mother. Soon, on her father's request, Rupa returns home. Her mother refuses to acknowledge her marriage; instead, she decides to marry her off to her former match. On the day of the wedding, just when Rupa had given up all hope, Somu makes a dramatic entry to take charge of his ‘sasurbari’ (in-laws’ house). But is it only his love for Rupa that has brought him here, or does Somu have a secret of his own?

== Cast ==
- Prosenjit Chatterjee as Somu
- Rituparna Sengupta as Rupa
- Ranjit Mallick as Achintya Roy, Rupa's Father
- Anamika Saha as Binodini Roy, Rupa's Mother
- Subhashish Mukherjee as Bhombol, chief servant
- Tota Roy Chowdhury as Prashanta Mitra
- Anuradha Ray as Bibhabati
- Bharat Kaul as Rana
- Karishma Kar as Ruma

== Soundtrack ==
Sasurbari Zindabad
- album of the film

Soundtrack album by Babul Bose
- Released: 2000
- Recorded: 1999
- Genre: Feature film soundtrack
- Length: 15:35
- Language: Bengali
- Label: Shree Venkatesh Films
- Director: Haranath Chakraborty
- Producer: Shrikant Mohta

Babul Bose chronology
Aag Hi Aag (1999)	Sasurbari Zindabad (2000)	Madhur Milan (2000)

Singles from Sasurbari Zindabad
- 1. "Chokh Tule Dekho Na Ke Esechhe" Released: 27 August 2018; 2. "Premeri Railgadi" Released: 27 August 2018; 3. "Shona Shona Khame Mora" Released: 28 August 2018; 4. "Aaj Ami Maal Chhara Karo Noy" Released: 28 August 2018; 5. "Jago Maa Maharani" Released: 29 August 2018; 6. "Jah Chharo Naa" Released: 29 August 2018

All lyrics are written by Gautam Sushmit; all music is composed by Babul Bose.

No.	Title	Lyrics	Music	Singer(s)	Length
1.	"Chokh Tule Dekho Na Ke Esechhe"	Gautam Sushmit	Babul Bose	Babul Supriyo; Poornima	4:52
2.	"Premeri Railgadi"	Gautam Sushmit	Babul Bose	Babul Supriyo; Poornima	4:07
3.	"Shona Shona Khame"	Gautam Sushmit	Babul Bose	Udit Narayan	4:11
4.	"Aaj Ami"	Gautam Sushmit	Babul Bose	Babul Supriyo	3:11
5.	"Jago Maa Maharani"	Gautam Sushmit	Babul Bose	Babul Supriyo; Poornima	4:37
6.	"Jah Chharo Naa"	Gautam Sushmit	Babul Bose	Udit Narayan; Sadhana Sargam	4:37
Total length:					15:35

== Box office ==
Sasurbari Zindabad created box office history by becoming the first Bengali film to cross the ₹2 crore mark in West Bengal. Made on a large budget of ₹60–70 lakh, the film's final box office collections reached a staggering ₹2.50 crore; thus fulfilling all criteria to be adjudged an ‘All-Time Blockbuster’. In the process, it went past previous Prosenjit-Rituparna blockbusters like Sudhu Ekbar Bolo, Baba Keno Chakor and Moner Manush, to become the highest grosser ever. It eventually completed a ‘Golden Jubilee’ by running for a period exceeding 50 weeks in the Bengal districts. It held the highest grosser record for 2 1/2 years until another Haranath Chakraborty directorial, Sathi, overtook its tally.

== Video rights ==
The official video rights of this film have been purchased by Eskay Video. As of May 2013, the MRP is ₹49.

== Legacy ==
Sasurbari Zindabad introduced a number of new trends in Bengali cinema which were attributed as the main factors behind the film's smashing performance. The factors were:

=== Big budget ===
Previously, the average budget for a Bengali film was around 10 to 15 lakhs. But this film changed the trend by costing nearly ₹70 lakhs. A substantial amount of this budget was spent on improved picture quality, technology, grandeur, sets, costumes, and shooting locales, which increased the attractiveness of the film. Buoyed by the film's humongous success, producers became more confident and budgets of Bengali films gradually picked up.

=== Use of CinemaScope ===
Barring a few exceptions, CinemaScope was non-existent in Tollywood. This film re-introduced CinemaScope, which lends a brighter, more colourful and more attractive visual appeal to the film. Soon, CinemaScope became a regular feature in Bengali films.

=== Bollywood art director ===
Kaushik Sarkar, art director of Shah Rukh Khan starrer Yes Boss was roped in to do the production designing of this film. High-quality colourful sets made it the most glamorous Bengali film at that time. As a result, other filmmakers were forced to abandon the degraded production quality prevalent then in Tollywood.

=== Designer clothes ===
Fashion designers were approached to do the costumes of Prosenjit and Rituparna. Down the decade, designer clothes are the norm in Tollywood now.

=== Liplock ===
Prosenjit and Rituparna did a liplock in this film which lasted for nearly 30 seconds. This was one of the first such instances of a couple kissing each other on the lips in the history of mainstream Bengali cinema. Before this, the only other film for which the popular pair of Prosenjit and Rituparna locked lips (in multiple sequences) was Rituparno Ghosh’s Utsab, which had its festival premiere just 3 weeks earlier. In that film they had gone one step further and performed a sex scene as well. After Sasurbari Zindabad, both Rituparna and Prosenjit engaged in quite a few intimate sequences with other heroes and heroines, but they never locked lips with each other onscreen again.

== See also ==
- Shoshurbari Zindabad, a 2002 Bangladeshi remake
