= Sanghamitra Talukder =

Indian actress

- Born: Kolkata, India
- Occupation: Actress
- Years active: 2011–present
- Notable work: Aamar Durga; Gangster Ganga; Sarbojaya

Sanghamitra Talukder is an Indian television actress, who works in Bengali television and films. She is known for her roles in Aamar Durga, Gangster Ganga, and Sarbojaya.

== Television ==
| Year | Show | Role | Notes | Channel |
|---|---|---|---|---|
| 2011– 2013 | Tapur Tupur | Tikli | Side Role | Star Jalsha |
| 2013– 2014 | Kache Aye Shoi | Rinku | Side Role | Zee Bangla |
| 2014– 2015 | Hoyto Tomari Jonno | Anu | Lead Role | Colors Bangla |
| 2016– 2018 | Aamar Durga | Durga Mukherjee | Lead Role | Zee Bangla |
| 2019 | Gangster Ganga | Ganga | Lead Role | Sun Bangla |
| 2021–2022 | Sarbojaya | Sara Sen | Second Lead Role | Zee Bangla |
| 2023–2025 | Geeta L.L.B. | Gini Mukherjee | Negative Role | Star Jalsha |
| 2025–Present | Parashuram - Ajker Nayok | Sheetal aka Shiki | Negative Role | Star Jalsha |

=== Awards ===
| Year | Award | Category | Character | Film/TV show |
|---|---|---|---|---|
| 2017 | Zee Bangla Sonar Sansar Awards 2017 | Priyo Meye | Durga | Aamar Durga |
| 2024 | Star Jalsha Parivar Awards 2024 | Sera Khalnayika | Gini | Geeta L.L.B. |

=== Mahalaya ===
- Devi Doshomohavidya as Devi Tara (Mahalaya 2022) (Colors Bangla)

=== Films ===
- The Senapatis: Mission Bomboy
