= Bhoot Bhooturey Samuddurey =

- Directed by: Swapan Ghoshal
- Produced by: Swapan Ghoshal
- Music by: Priyo Chatterjee
- Release date: 2014
- Country: India
- Language: Bengali

Bhoot Bhooturey Samuddurey is a 2014 Bengali children's film directed by Swapan Ghoshal. The film is based on a short story by Prafulla Roy.

== Plot ==
The story of the film is narrated by Paran Bandyopadhyay. The plot involves two siblings, Titli and Tabul, who go to Digha for a family vacation. They find that Lalkamol babu, who occupied the next room, has disappeared without any trace. The two children, getting involved with this mystery, unexpectedly find a group of ghosts.

== Cast ==
- Megha Deb
- Sayan Sarkar
- Bhaswar Chatterjee
- Jayjit Banerjee
- Santilal Mukherjee
- Paran Bandopadhyay

== Reviews ==
Sutapa Singha of The Times of India gave the film a 3 out of 5 stars. She asserts that the film "makes an impact because of the convincing performances".

According to Shoma A. Chatterji of The Indian Express, the film has good actors, but its intention is wasted due to "badly-scripted characters".
