= Kushal Chakraborty =

Indian actor and film director

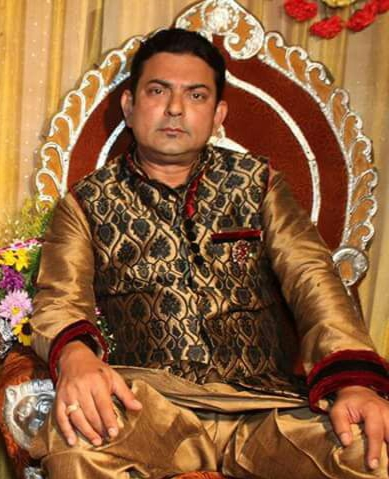
- Chakraborty in 2017
- Born: 21 July 1968 (age 58); Calcutta, West Bengal, India
- Education: Jadavpur University (B.E. Civil engineering)
- Occupation: Actor
- Years active: 1974—present

Kushal Chakraborty (born 21 July 1968) is an Indian actor and film director associated with Bengali cinema. At the age of six, he played the role of Mukul in Satyajit Ray's film Sonar Kella for which he won National Film Award for best child artist in 1974. He introduced Rituparna Sengupta to showbiz with his directorial venture Shwet Kapot (1989). His directorial venture Dhyatterika (2005) was a major success on television.

Kushal is a civil engineering graduate from Jadavpur University.

He won the National Film Award for Best Child Artist for his role in Sonar Kella, directed by Satyajit Ray (1974).

== List of work ==
=== Films ===
Year	Title	Role	Ref.
1974	Sonar Kella	Mukul	
1992	Bhalobasa O Andhakar		
1995	Kakababu Herey Gelen		
1995	Sansar Sangram		
1996	Nikhonj		
1997	Chandragrahan		
1997	Prem Joware		
1998	Ranakshetra		
1999	Sampradan		
1999	Santan		
2000	Dabee		
2001	Ebong Tumi Aar Ami		
2001	Etai Swarga		
2002	Anamni Angana		
2002	Deba		
2003	Sharbari		
2004	Teen Ekke Teen		
2006	Mahasangram		
2015	Alor Khojen		
2016	Akash Choan		
2017	Samantaral		
2017	Curzoner Kalom		

=== TV series ===
Year	Title	Role	Direction	Channel	Note	Ref.
1989	Rong Berong	Ruslan	Yes	DD Bangla	Debut of Rituparna Sengupta	
1994	Phire Elam					
	Sahityer Shera Somoy		Yes			
2005	Dhyatterika	Kartik	Yes	Zee Bangla		
2009-13	Sholo Aana			Colors Bangla		
2013-14	Hiyar Majhe		Yes			
	Bijoyini		Yes			
	Som Theke Shoni		Yes			
	Trityo Purush			Zee Bangla		
	Jodi Prem Dile Na Prane			Zee Bangla		
	Sanghat			Zee Bangla		
	@Bhalobasha.com	Agni		Star Jalsha		
	Bojhena Se Bojhena	Sharat		Star Jalsha		
	Rajjotok			Zee Bangla		
	Raashi			Zee Bangla		
	Aponjon			Colors Bangla		
	Byomkesh			Colors Bangla		
	Aamar Durga	Sujoy Mukherjee		Zee Bangla		
	Khokababu	Jagannath Mukherjee aka Jaga		Star Jalsha		
	Rakhi Bandhan			Star Jalsha		
	Jarowar Jhumko	Hirak Roy		Zee Bangla		
	Bajlo Tomar Alor Benu	Nishikanto Pal		Star Jalsha		
	Jaahanara	Nizamuddin Sheikh		Colors Bangla		
	Krishnakoli	Amropali's father			Zee Bangla	
	Alo Chhaya	Alokendu Adhikari		Zee Bangla		
	Sreemoyee			Star Jalsha		
	Kora Pakhi			Star Jalsha		
	Titli	Aparesh Bose		Star Jalsha		
	Jamuna Dhaki			Zee Bangla		
	Gangaram	Nepal Roy		Star Jalsha		
	Boron	Nandan Banerjee		Star Jalsha		
2021-22	Sarbojoya	Sanjay Chowdhury		Zee Bangla		
2021–Present	Saathi			Sun Bangla		
2022	Madhabilata	Pushpa Ranjan Mukherjee		Star Jalsha		
2023	Kamala o Shriman Prithviraj			Star Jalsha		
2024	Roshnai	Ranjan Prasad/Anjan Prasad (Dual Role)		Star Jalsha		
2024	Shubho Bibaho			Star Jalsha		
2025	Kusum			Zee Bangla		
2025	O Mor Dorodiya			Star Jalsha		

== Personal life ==
On 11 December 2009, Kushal married Sangita Chakraborty. After divorce he remarried actress Sancharee Mukherjee in January 2015.
