= Geeta LL.B =

2023 Indian Bengali TV series

- Genre: Courtroom drama Romance; Thriller; Action
- Created by: Blues Productions
- Developed by: Blues Productions
- Written by: Dialogues; Snehasish Chakraborty
- Screenplay by: Snehasish Chakraborty
- Story by: Snehasish Chakraborty
- Directed by: Rupam Baag
- Creative director: Snehasish Chakraborty
- Starring: Hiya Mukherjee; Kunal Shil; Rahul Banerjee; Supriya Dutta; Sanghamitra Talukdar
- Theme music composer: Snehasish Chakraborty
- Country of origin: India
- Original language: Bengali
- No. of episodes: 677

Production
- Executive producers: Runa Dey Sarkar (Blues Productions); Samajita, Saptara & Akash (Star Jalsha)
- Producer: Snehasish Chakraborty
- Production location: Kolkata
- Cinematography: Debabrata Mallick
- Editor: Bapan Pramanik
- Running time: 22 minutes
- Production company: Blues Productions

Original release
- Network: Star Jalsha
- Release: 20 November 2023 – 2 October 2025

Geeta LL.B. is an Indian Bengali language romantic thriller courtroom drama television series that premiered on 20 November 2023 and ended abruptly on 2 October 2025 on Star Jalsha. The show was produced by Snehasish Chakraborty of Blues Productions and starred Hiya Mukherjee as Geeta and Kunal Shil as Swastik in lead roles.

== Plot ==
Advocate Geeta Ganguly struggles to make her name in the legal world of men but soon faces a challenging case which could change her career, during which she crosses path with Swastik Mukherjee, a romeo belonging to an aristocratic family. Soon Swastik falls in love with Geeta and realises what true love is, despite her firm refusal he manages to convince her and they get married after Geeta's victory in Padma's case. After their marriage Swastik's family refuses to accept their marriage moreover Geeta discovers that Swastik is the son of her main rival and soon she declares rebellion against the family and decides to leave and fight for justice.

== Cast ==
=== Main ===
- Hiya Mukherjee as Advocate Geeta Mukherjee (née Ganguly) aka Geeta L.L.B: Swastik's wife (2023-2025)
- Kunal Shil as Advocate Swastik Mukherjee: Geeta's husband (2023-2025)

=== Recurring ===
- Sanghamitra Talukder as Gini Mukherjee (née Ganguly): Geeta's Sister; Satwik's wife (2023-2025)
- Rahul Ganguly as Satwik Mukherjee: Tanvi, Swastik, and Mehek's brother; Gini's husband (2023-2025)
- Supriyo Dutta as Advocate Agnijit "Agni" Mukherjee: Satwik, Tanvi, Swastik and Mehek's father (2023-2025)
- Koushiki Paul as Mehek Chatterjee (née Mukherjee): Satwik, Tanvi and Swastik's sister; Ankit's wife (2023-2025)
- Subhrojit Saha / Sayan Karmakar as Ankit Chatterjee; Mehek's husband (2023-2025)
- Niladri Lahiri as Paramjit Mukherjee aka Niloy (2023-2025)
- Jayashree Mukherjee Kaul as Bonhi Mukherjee (2023-2024)
- Bhaswar Chatterjee as Proloyjit "Proloy" Mukherjee swastik's uncle: Agni's younger brother (2023-2025)
- Meghna Halder as Raka Mukherjee (2023-2025)
- Basanti Chatterjee as Brojobala Mukherjee (2023-2025): Swastik's Grandmother
- Indrakshi Dey as Kavya Banerjee: Swastik's one-sided obsessive love interest; Kripan's sister (2023-2024)
- Reshma Mondal as Padma Das: Former maid of Mukherjee's house; Kripan's wife (2023-2025)
- Soumak Basu as Kripan "Kripu" Banerjee aka Babusona: Kavya's brother and Mehek's ex-fianceé and one sided obsessive lover; Padma's husband (2023-2025)
- Kanchana Moitra as Jagriti Mukherjee (2023-2025): Swastik's mother
- Kushal Papai Bhowmick as Kripan's friend (2023-2025)
- Kaustuv Sengupta as Kiran Kanti Banerjee: Kavya and Kripan's father (2023-2025)
- Pallab Chakraborty as Kripan's friend (2023–present)
- Beas Bhattacharya as Saina (2023)
- Prarona Bhattacharya as Tanvi Mukherjee: Satwik, Swastik and Mehek's sister; Agni's elder daughter (2023-2025)
- Sahamita Acharya as Ilin Mukherjee (2023-2025): Satwik, Tanvi, Swastik and Mehek's cousin sister
- Maahi Kar as Isha Mukherjee (2023-2025): Satwik, Tanvi, Swastik and Mehek's cousin sister
- Suravi Sanyal as Ira Mukherjee (2023-2025): Satwik, Tanvi, Swastik and Mehek's cousin sister
- Kaushiki Basu as Misha Mukherjee (2023-2025): Satwik, Tanvi, Swastik and Mehek's cousin sister
- Mallika Banerjee as Swapna Ganguly (2023-2025)
- Ashim Mukhopadhyay as Ganesh Ganguly: Gini and Geeta's father (2023-2025)
- Arindol Bagchi as Pongkoj Khasnobis (2023)
- Rajvi Saha as Pongkoj Khasnobis's daughter (2023-2025)
- Biplab Dasgupta as Tukaram Avatramani (2023-2024)
- Aditya Roy as Bhojon Mitra (2023-2025)
- Sayan Banerjee as Dibakar Chowdhury aka Deva (2023-2025)
- Ayendri Lavnia Roy as Adhara Sinha (2025)
- Aditya Bakshi as Adhyay Sinha (2023)
- Tumpa Ghosh as Parishi Sinha (née Lahiri) (2025)
- Ashmita Chakraborty as Priya Mondal (2023-2025)
- Bharat Kaul as Dhiman Sen (2023)
- Soumi Paul
- Sayantani Majumder
- Taniya Paul
- Rahul Banerjee as Bishnudev Chatterjee (2023-2025)
- Mahua Halder
- Dolon Roy
- Oindrila Bose
- Pritha Chatterjee
- Payel Sarkar as Mohini
- Shobhana Bhunia
- Arunava Dutta

== Reception ==
=== Ratings ===
Week	Year	BARC viewership		Ref.
Week	Year	TRP	Rank	Ref.
Week 47	2023	6.2	5	
Week 48	2023	6.8	7	
Week 49	2023	7.3	3	
Week 50	2023	7.8	4	
Week 51	2023	7.9	4	
Week 52	2023	7.8	4	
Week 01	2024	7.9	4	
Week 02	2024	8.1	3	
Week 03	2024	8.3	3	
Week 04	2024	8.1	2	
Week 07	2024	7.9	4	
Week 08	2024	7.6	4	
Week 09	2024	7.8	4	
Week 10	2024	7.9	4	
Week 11	2024	7.7	4	
Week 12	2024	7.8	3	
Week 13	2024	6.9	4	
Week 14	2024	7.0	4	
Week 15	2024	6.8	5	
Week 16	2024	6.3	4	
Week 17	2024	6.3	5	
Week 18	2024	6.4	2	
Week 19	2024	6.0	2	
Week 24	2024	5.0	7	
Week 26	2024	5.5	7	
Week 27	2024	6.0	5	
Week 28	2024	5.4	9	
Week 29	2024	5.7	7	
Week 30	2024	6.1	7	

== Adaptations ==
Language	Title	Original Release	Network(s)	Last aired	Notes	Ref.
Hindi	Advocate Anjali Awasthi एडवोकेट अंजलि अवस्थी	8 August 2024	StarPlus	31 May 2026	Remake	
Telugu	Geetha LL.B గీత LL.B	2 December 2024	Star Maa	5 September 2025	Remake	
Kannada	Bhargavi LL.B ಭಾರ್ಗವಿ LL.B	3 March 2025	Colors Kannada	Ongoing	Remake	
Malayalam	Advocate Anjali അഡ്വക്കേറ്റ് അഞ്ജലി	10 November 2025	Asianet	Ongoing	Remake	
Marathi	Vachan Dile Tu Mala वचन दिले तू मला	15 December 2025	Star Pravah	11 October 2026	Remake	
