= Saathi (TV series) =

Indian Bengali television series

- Genre: Drama
- Created by: Saregama
- Based on: Roja by V. Padmavathy & Vasubharathy
- Developed by: Sekkizhar; Guru Sampath Kumar
- Written by: Dialogues; Sudip Pal
- Story by: Sudip Pal
- Directed by: Akash Sen
- Starring: Anumita Dutta; Indrajeet Bose; Anmary Tom
- Theme music composer: Debojyoti Mishra; Samidh Mukherjee
- Opening theme: "Oh Oh Oh Ohhh Saathi Re" by Anweshaa
- Country of origin: India
- Original language: Bengali
- No. of seasons: 2
- No. of episodes: 906

Production
- Executive producers: Sumana Biswas (Friends Communication); Puja (Sun Bangla)
- Producers: Firdausul Hasan; Probal Haldar
- Editors: Krishnendu Ghosh; Shekhar Ghosh
- Camera setup: Multi-camera
- Running time: 21 minutes
- Production company: Friends Communication

Original release
- Network: Sun Bangla
- Release: 7 February 2022 – 3 August 2024

Saathi (transl. Partner) is a 2022 Indian Bengali Language Drama television series which premiered on 7 February 2022 on the Bengali general entertainment channel Sun Bangla. The show was produced by Firdausul Hasan and Probal Haldar of Friends Communication and stars Anumita Dutta and Indrajeet Bose. It was a remake of the Tamil Television series Roja. It was the longest-running serial on Sun Bangla.

== Cast ==
=== Main ===
- Anumita Dutta as Sumedha Sanyal (née Banerjee) aka Brishti: Om's wife, Ananda's foster daughter.(Dead)
- Indrajeet Bose as
  - Om Sanyal: Brishti's husband, Alokesh's son.
  - Ivaan Chowdhury - Om's lookalike, Om and Brishti's son and Meghla's husband.
- Annmary Tom as Meghla Chowdhury (née Sanyal): Om and Brishti's Assumed Daughter turned Daughter-in-law, Ivaan's wife.

=== Recurring ===
- Debdut Ghosh as Ananda Thakur - owner of Ananda orphanage, Brishti's foster father.
- Tania Kar as Madhuri Banerjee - Brishti's mother.
- Goutam Sarkar / Kushal Chakraborty as Alokesh Sanyal - Om's father. (dead)
- Piyali Mitra as Promita Sanyal - Om's mother, Alokesh's wife (Dead)
- Rumki Chatterjee as Swarnomoyi Sanyal - Om's grandmother. (Dead)
- Anindita Das as Madhushree - Ashish's Wife
- Megha Mondal / Srabanti Banerjee as Esha - Om's sister.
- Shirin Roy / Sreyasri Roy as Priyanka
- Rupsa Chatterjee / Rupa Bhattacharjee as Satobhisa Sen
- Disha Roychowdhury as Mahua - Om's aunt
- Anirban Ghosh as Arnab - Om's uncle
- Atri Bhattacharya as Rabi - Om's assistant, Esha's Husband
- Sankar Sanku Chakrabarty as Tarun - Alokesh's PA.
- Arnab Bhadra as Goutam Chowdhury - Ivaan's father.
- Rumpa Chatterjee as Sujata Chowdhury - Ivaan's mother.
- Mrittika Chakraborty as Srija - Ashish And Madhushree's Daughter
- Rajesh Kr Chattopadhyay as Kingshuk
- Ujani Dasgupta as Titli - Mahua's Daughter
- Ashmita Chakraborty as Raika - Kingshuk's (Husband of Titli) Brother's Daughter
- Leeza Goswami as Piyali - Ivaan's sister
- Puja Dutta as Mitali - Ivaan's sister
- Koyel Sanchari as Chapala - Maid of Sanyal House

== Adaptations ==
Language	Title	Original release	Network(s)	Last aired	Notes	Ref.
Tamil	Roja ரோஜா	9 April 2018	Sun TV	3 December 2022	Original	
Kannada	Sevanthi ಸೇವಂತಿ	25 February 2019	Udaya TV	Ongoing	Remake	
Telugu	Roja రోజా	11 March 2019	Gemini TV	27 March 2020	Remake	
Hindi	Sindoor Ki Keemat सिंदूर की कीमत	18 October 2021	Dangal TV	29 April 2023	Remake	
Malayalam	Kaliveedu കളിവീട്	15 November 2021	Surya TV	22 September 2024	Remake	
Bengali	Saathi সাথী	7 February 2022	Sun Bangla	3 August 2024	Remake	
Marathi	Tharala Tar Mag! ठरलं तर मग!	5 December 2022	Star Pravah	Ongoing	Remake	
