= Aatagallu =

- Theatrical release poster
- Directed by: Paruchuri Murali
- Screenplay by: Paruchuri Murali
- Story by: Paruchuri Murali
- Produced by: Vaasireddy Ravindra; Vaasireddy Sivaji; Vaddapudi Jithendra; Makkina Ramu
- Starring: Jagapathi Babu; Nara Rohit; Darshana Banik
- Cinematography: Vijay C. Kumar
- Edited by: Marthand K. Venkatesh
- Music by: Sai Karthik
- Production company: Friends Movie Creations
- Release date: 24 August 2018
- Running time: 135 mins
- Country: India
- Language: Telugu

Aatagallu (transl. "Players") is a 2018 Indian Telugu-language action thriller film produced by Vaasireddy Ravindra, Vaasireddy Sivaji, Vaddapudi Jithendra, and Makkina Ramu under the Friends Movie Creations banner. The film was directed by Paruchuri Murali. The film stars Jagapathi Babu, Nara Rohit, Darshana Banik in the lead roles and music composed by Sai Karthik. Editing and Cinematography was handled by Marthand K. Venkatesh and Vijay C. Kumar respectively. The film was released on 24 August 2018.

== Plot ==
Siddharth (Nara Rohit) is a famous film director. His wife Anjali (Darshana Banik) is killed in their house, and he is arrested as the prime suspect. The public prosecutor in the case is Veerendra (Jagapathi Babu), a legal legend who always stands for justice, never bows to money or power, and has never lost a case. Because of the celebrity involvement and Veerendra's reputation, the case receives wide media and public attention.

During the bail hearing, Veerendra presents CCTV footage of the house to the judge, which shows Siddharth as the only person possibly present at the crime scene at the time of the murder. As a result, the court denies bail, and Siddharth is kept in custody for further investigation. During interrogation, Siddharth does not confess but instead predicts that Veerendra (despite being the prosecutor) will one day defend him, expressing confidence in Veerendra's determination to pursue justice. Intrigued by Siddharth's confidence, Veerendra re-investigates the case. Upon revisiting the crime scene, he notices a loophole in the chain of evidence: the house window shows signs of a break-in.

At the next hearing, as Siddharth predicted, Veerendra switches sides and defends him. He accuses Munna (Sritej) of being the real suspect. Munna had admired Anjali years earlier and harassed her, even threatening her if she refused to marry him. After Anjali reported him to the police, he was jailed for three months. Days before the murder, Munna began working as a carpenter at a neighbor's house. CCTV footage shows him entering the neighbor's house a few hours before the crime but never leaving. Veerendra argues that Munna entered Anjali's house through the window and killed her. The court accepts this argument, releases Siddharth, and issues an arrest warrant for Munna.

After being released, Siddharth tracks down Munna and beats him, apparently to avenge his wife's death. Police intervene, saving Munna and sending him to the hospital. Later in court, Munna confesses to killing Anjali but shows no remorse. He is sentenced to death.

Days after the ruling, Veerendra visits Siddharth's house and notices something suspicious: Munna's mother arrives with a large bag of cash, demanding Siddharth “return the money and give her son back.” Siddharth and police officer Nayak (Subbaraju) then reveal the truth: Siddharth did kill Anjali. He bribed Nayak to fabricate the evidence loophole and erase footage showing Munna leaving the house. Siddharth initially intended to kill Munna to silence him, but the police intervened. At the hospital, Siddharth and Nayak offered Munna money to take the blame, promising that Nayak would use his influence to reduce the sentence to a few years. With his mother suffering from cancer and his family in poverty, Munna agreed, not expecting to receive the death penalty.

Siddharth and Nayak suggest Veerendra forget the matter, as he has no evidence and the case cannot be reopened after Munna's courtroom confession. Furious, Veerendra attempts to kill Siddharth, vowing that if he cannot get justice in court, he will achieve it with his own hands. Although Siddharth survives, Veerendra continues his attempts until one failed attack leaves him injured and paralyzed.

Desperate, Veerendra pleads with Siddharth to surrender. Believing Veerendra is no longer a threat, Siddharth reveals everything: days before the murder, he had killed a scooter rider while drunk driving. Wracked with guilt, Anjali urged Siddharth to confess, but fearing she might go to the police, he killed her.

On the day of Munna's execution, Siddharth meets him in jail per his last wish. Veerendra then arrives with a Governor's order halting Munna's execution and authorizing Siddharth's arrest. He obtained the order by presenting spy camera footage of Siddharth's confession. Faced with the collapse of his public image, Siddharth commits suicide.

== Cast ==
- Jagapathi Babu as Public Prosecutor Veerendra
- Nara Rohit as Siddharth
- Darshana Banik as Anjali
- Brahmanandam as Go Go
- Subbaraju as DCP Nayak
- Sritej as Munna
- Chalapathi Rao as Tenali Naidu
- Nagineedu as CM
- Prabhu as Dharma Rao
- Satyam Rajesh as Rajesh Kumar
- Priya as Padma, Anjali's mother
- Jeeva as Munna's father
- Tulasi as Munna's mother
- Pilla Prasad as Excise Minister
- Chitti
- Muralidhar Goud
- Vadlamani Srinivas as Judge

== Production ==
The shooting of the film began on 11 October 2017 at Ramanaidu Studios, Hyderabad, Telangana, India, with the "first look" poster releasing on 11 May 2018. On 9 June 2018, a 67-second teaser was released, followed by the first song, "Nee Valle," on 10 June from Red FM at Mango Music. Finally, the theatrical trailer was launched on 30 June 2018.

== Soundtrack ==
Aatagallu

Soundtrack album by Sai Karthik
- Released: 10 June 2018
- Recorded: 2018
- Genre: Feature film soundtrack
- Length: 8:44
- Language: Telugu
- Label: Mango Music
- Producer: Sai Karthik

Sai Karthik chronology
Ego (2018)	Aatagallu (2018)	Lover (2018)

The music was composed by Sai Karthik and was released on Mango Music Company.

No.	Title	Lyrics	Singer(s)	Length
1.	"Neevalle Neevalle"	Shreshta	ML Shruti	4:34
2.	"Maya Bazar"	Ramajogayya Sastry	Revanth	4:10
Total length:				8:44

== Reception ==
123telugu.com rated 2.5/5 and said, "On the whole, Atagallu is an old school murder mystery which you might have seen many a time in the past. As long as Jagapathi Babu and Nara Rohit take center stage, things look good and watchable. But the rest of the narration, screenplay and suspense factor are ages old and have nothing new to offer making the film a routine and outdated watch this weekend." The Times of India rated 1.5/5 and said, “Jagapathi Babu’s stern and serious looks work out good for him. Darshana Banik comes in the flashback, so you know that her character is already dead. Brahmanandam struggles to evoke some laughter. There’s no reason why you should suffer this movie."
