= Aasroy =

- Directed by: Haranath Chakraborty
- Produced by: Sukumar Bhadra
- Starring: Prosenjit Chatterjee; Rituparna Sengupta; Deepankar De; Laboni Sarkar
- Music by: Babul Bose
- Release date: 2000
- Country: India
- Language: Bengali

Aasroy (lit. 'Shelter') is a 2000 Bengali film directed by Haranath Chakraborty and produced by Sukumar Bhadra. The film stars Prosenjit Chatterjee and Rituparna Sengupta in the lead roles, with music composed by Babul Bose.

== Plot ==
Dr. Ankhu (Deepankar De), a heart specialist, has lost his wife and now lives with their son, Sudhanshu (Prosenjit Chatterjee). Dr. Ankhu remarries, and his new wife, Bonashri, takes excellent care of Sudhanshu, who becomes very fond of her. Sudhanshu falls in love with Joysree (Rituparna Sengupta), a charming young woman. As their relationship develops, Joysree discloses that she is an orphan who lost her mother in childhood. She was raised by three eunuchs who provided her with loving care. Despite this revelation, Sudhanshu remains committed to marrying her and proposes to his parents. While his father initially opposes the match, his stepmother supports his decision. During this period, Sudhanshu has an accident, and Joysree nurses him back to health. Dr. Ankhu ultimately comes to recognize Joysree as a suitable match for his son and consents to the marriage.

== Cast ==
- Prosenjit Chatterjee
- Rituparna Sengupta
- Deepankar De
- Laboni Sarkar
- Subhendu Chatterjee
- Kaushik Banerjee

== Soundtrack ==
Aasroy

Soundtrack album by Babul Bose
- Released: 2000
- Recorded: 2000
- Genre: Feature film soundtrack
- Language: Bengali
- Producer: Sukumar Bhadra

Babul Bose composed the music for the film.

Track	Song	Singer(s)	Time
1	"Ekhane Aasi Ni Aami"	Udit Narayan & Priya Bhattacharya
2	"Dekhli Kemon"	Babul Supriyo & Ashis Kumar
3	"Keu Bole Ram"	Swapna Mukherjee
4	"Maa Aami Maa"	Sadhana Sargam & Babul Supriyo
5	"Samne Tumi Ele"	Kumar Sanu & Sadhana Sargam

== Awards ==
Year	Nominee / work	Award	Result
2001	Prosenjit Chatterjee	BFJA Awards For Best Actor	Won
