= GlaxoSmithKline Pharmaceuticals =

Indian pharmaceutical company

GlaxoSmithKline Pharmaceuticals Ltd
- Company type: Public
- Traded as: BSE: 500660; NSE: GLAXO
- Industry: Pharmaceuticals & healthcare
- Founded: 13 November 1924 as H. J. Foster & Co. Limited
- Headquarters: Mumbai, Maharashtra, India
- Products: Medicines and vaccines
- Revenue: ▲₹3,723 crore (US$390 million) (2025)
- Operating income: ▲₹1,169 crore (US$120 million) (2025)
- Net income: ▲₹915 crore (US$95 million) (2025)
- Number of employees: 3,100 (2025)
- Parent: GSK
- Website: india-pharma.gsk.com
- Footnotes / references Financials as of 31 March 2025.

GlaxoSmithKline Pharmaceuticals Ltd is an Indian research-based pharmaceutical and healthcare company, and a subsidiary of GSK. The company's product portfolio includes prescription medicines and vaccines. Its prescription medicines range across therapeutic areas such as anti-infectives, dermatology, gynaecology, diabetes, oncology, cardiovascular disease, and respiratory diseases. It also offers a range of vaccines, for the prevention of hepatitis A, hepatitis B, invasive disease caused by H, influenzae, chickenpox, diphtheria, pertussis, tetanus, rotavirus, cervical cancer, and others.

== History ==
It was founded on 13 November 1924 in India under the name of H.J.Foster & Co. Limited as an Agency House for distributing Baby Food Glaxo, Joseph Nathan & Co. In 1950, it changed its name to Glaxo Laboratories (I) Ltd.

Old GlaxoSmithKline logo until 9 June 2022
