= Darshana Banik =

Indian actress

- Born: Kolkata, India
- Education: East Calcutta Girl's College
- Occupation: Actress
- Years active: 2009–present
- Spouse: Saurav Das (m. 2023)

Darshana Banik is an Indian model and actress who works for the Bengali (Both Indian and Bangladesh), Hindi and Telugu Film industry. She started her career as a model.

== Early life ==
Darshana Banik was born in the heart of Calcutta, West Bengal, India. She completed her undergraduate degree from East Calcutta Girls College and postgraduate degree from Rabindra Bharati University.

== Personal life ==
Darshana Banik is an Indian bengali model who started modeling when she was a student. She married actor Saurav Das on 15 December 2023.

== Web series ==
| Year | Series | OTT | Character | Notes |
|---|---|---|---|---|
| 2018 | Six | Hoichoi | Rikhia | |
| 2019 | Bou Keno Psycho | Hoichoi | | Season 1 |
| 2021 | Byomkesh | Hoichoi | Hena Mullick | Season 6 |
| 2021 | Hello Mini S2 | Mx Player | Tista (Hacker Girl) | Season 2,3 |
| 2024 | Save The Tigers | Disney Hotstar | Harika | Season 2 |

== Television ==
| Year | Serial | Character | Channel | Notes |
|---|---|---|---|---|
| 2020 | Lockdown Diary - Galpo Holeo Satti | Amrita | Zee Bangla | In the episode Bibaha Barshiki |

== Brand Ambassador ==
Darshana Banik is a brand ambassador for different brands like Colors, Vodafone, PC Chandra Jewellers and Boroline.

== Music videos ==
| Year | Video | Singer(s) | Composer(s) | Co-actor(s) | Director(s) | Language | Music label |
|---|---|---|---|---|---|---|---|
| 2017 | Yeh Dil Hain Bekarar | Benny Dayal | Mohul Chakraborty | Neel Bhattacharya | Soumojit Adak & Team | Bengali | Queentales Production |
| 2018 | Megher Danay | Imran Mahmudul, Madhubanti Bagchi | Syed Nafis | Imran Mahmudul | Sushavan Das | Bengali | Dhruba Music Station |
| 2019 | Tor Naamer Icchera | Imran Mahmudul | Imran Mahmudul | Imran Mahmudul | Taneem Rahman Angshu | Bengali | Fox Unit Films |
| 2020 | Majhe Majhe Tobo | Arindom Chatterjee | Rabindranath Tagore | Arjun Chakrabarty | Dhrubo Banerjee | Bengali | Shree Venkatesh Films |
| 2021 | Tu Hi Toh Hai Khuda | Raj Barman | Baman & Chand | Raj Barman | Baba Yadav | Hindi | Zee Music Company |
| 2024 | Aaho Raja | Pawan Singh | Prince | Pawan Singh | | Bhojpuri | Wave Music |
| 2025 | Senura Daal Ke | Pawan Singh | Prince | Pawan Singh & Priyanka Singh | | Bhojpuri | AASHI Music |

== Filmography ==
| † | Denotes films that have not yet been released |

- All films are in Bengali-language, unless otherwise noted.

| Year | Title | Role | Notes | Ref |
|---|---|---|---|---|
| 2018 | Aschhe Abar Shabor | Rinku's friend | Debut film | |
| 2018 | Jojo | | | |
| 2018 | Aami Ashbo Phirey | | | |
| 2018 | Laboratory | | | |
| 2018 | Aatagallu | Anjali | Debut Telugu film | |
| 2019 | Mukhomukhi | | | |
| 2019 | Network | Prema | | |
| 2019 | Hullor | | | |
| 2021 | Shororipu 2: Jotugriho | | | |
| 2022 | Bangarraju | Apsara | Telugu film | |
| 2022 | Black | Haanika | Telugu film | |
| 2022 | Dybbuk | Norah | Debut Hindi film | |
| 2022 | Operation Sundarbans | Dr. Aditi | Debut Bangladeshi film | |
| 2022 | Pratighaat | | Debut Assamese film; released on ZEE5 | |
| 2022 | Olpo Holeo Sotti | Diya | Released on Klikk | |
| 2022 | Jaalbandi | | | |
| 2023 | Bhoy Peo Na | Herself | Special appearance in Item Song "Happy Hoe Jare"; Released on ZEE5 | |
| 2024 | Omar | Herself | Bangladeshi film; Special appearance in "Viral Baby" song | |
| 2024 | Surjo | Diya | Remake of Malayalam film Charlie | |
| 2024 | Jamalaye Jibonto Bhanu | Suchitra Sen | | |
| 2025 | Porichoy Gupto | Snehalata | | |
| 2025 | Antaratma | Rupkotha | Bangladeshi film | |
| 2025 | Metro... In Dino | Jhinuk Sarkar | Hindi film | |
| 2025 | Devi Chowdhurani | Sagar | | |
| 2025 | The Academy of Fine Arts | Herself | Special appearance in "The Churi Song" | |
| 2026 | Aryabhatt Ka Zero | Bobby | Hindi | |
