= Gyarakal =

- Theatrical release poster
- Directed by: Haranath Chakraborty
- Produced by: Pijush Saha; Rajib Bhadra
- Starring: Prosenjit Chatterjee; Rachana Banerjee; Jisshu Sengupta; Ranjit Mallick; Kanchan Mullick
- Music by: Babul Bose
- Release date: 2004
- Country: India
- Language: Bengali

Gyarakal (Bengali: গ্যাড়াকল) (also called Gaindakal) is a 2004 Bengali comedy drama film directed by Haranath Chakraborty and produced by Pijush Saha, Rajib Bhadra. The film features actors Prosenjit Chatterjee and Rachana Banerjee in the lead roles. Music of the film has been composed by Babul Bose.

== Plot ==
This is a comedy. A most popular businessman named Balohari Majumdar residing in Bhowanipore wants his daughter to become a great singer. One day Balohari's daughter Disha and her teacher sang a song. Disha and her music teacher Tablu loved each other. Balohari does not approve, Tablu runs away and loses his job. Then Balohari became angry and he told everyone he needed a married music teacher with his wife. In the meantime, a local singer named Pradip needed a job. One day he went to a club (three-not-three) function at Ranaghat. At the function he met Sikha. Sikha needed 30,000 rupees immediately to repay the loan taken by her brother for getting a job from Chanu Bose who was the son of the local Panchayat who had given them a year time to repay the loan otherwise he would marry Sikha whereas Pradip needed an immediate job. Chanu was desperately wanting to marry Sikha in exchange of money, came to her household fully drunken and started threatening Sikha's father Pratap Babu to repay the loan taken otherwise hand over Sikha to him but Pratap Babu didn't want that and there he saw Pradip staying a night at her house and seeing that Chanu started talking bad about Sikha and Pradip's relationship and there he had a huge fight with Pradip which led to a feud between them. Upon seeing this Pratap Babu advised Pradip to run away with Sikha from Ranaghat and go back to Kolkata and find a hideout. So they became a fake husband-wife and came to Balohari's home. Balohari's family liked them. Then they stayed at Balohari's home. One day Tablu watched Pradip and Disha leave a market. He was very angry. In the meantime Sikha falls in love with Pradip. Pradip goes to Balohari's factory and catches Balohari's cashier who was stealing things from Balohari's factory. Then Disha sings a song in a competition and wins. Sikha tries to stop Pradip from leaving Balohari's home. Sikha informs her father to send her back. Disha was missing. They also thought Pradip had kidnapped his daughter. Balohari discovered that Pradip-Sikha were not married. He becomes angry. Pradip wants Tablu and Disha to get married so they meet at Kalighat to give their marriage, there came Chanu Bose with his goons to interrupt the marriage as he learned that Pradip and Sikha were staying at Balohari Nivas as fake husband and wife. Pradip and Chanu engaged in a fierce fight thereby leading Chanu to be arrested by the police. Finally, Balohari accepts Tablu, and forgot all the misunderstandings on Pradip and Sikha thereby helped them marrying each other and also Disha and Tablu are happily married.

== Cast ==
- Prosenjit Chatterjee as Pradip
- Rachana Banerjee as Sikha
- Jisshu Sengupta as Tablu
- Soumili Biswas as Disha
- Ranjit Mallick as Balohari Majumdar
- Anamika Saha Disha's mother
- Kanchan Mullick as Person came for donation
- Nimu Bhowmik as Haridas, Balohari's manager
- Rajesh Sharma as Chanu Bose
- Nirmal Kumar as Pratap Babu, Sikha's father

== Awards ==
- Ganrakal (2004) won the Bengal Film Journalists' Association – Best Clean & Entertainment Film Award.
