= Soumili Biswas =

Bengali film and television actress, model, TV anchor, and a classical dancer

- Born: 29 September; Kolkata, West Bengal, India
- Occupations: Actress; Anchor; Dancer; Politician
- Years active: 2003–present
- Political party: Bharatiya Janata Party (2021–present)
- Spouse: Ayan Ghosh (m. 2012)

Soumili Ghosh Biswas is an Indian actress, politician, anchor, and classical dancer who works primarily in the Bengali cinema and television.

== Early life ==
She was born in Barisha/Behala, in south Kolkata, as the youngest of two siblings. She has an elder brother, named Sujoy. She went to the Bidya Bharati Girls' High School in Behala, Kolkata, and graduated in economics (honours) from the Jogamaya Devi College, a women's college of the University of Calcutta. She started training in Bharatnatyam from about the age of three, and received training under Thankamani Kutty and in ballet from Mamata Shankar. She regularly performs in dance dramas and in solo and group classical performances in Kolkata and elsewhere. She has received the Sangeet Ratna and the Sangeet Bibhakar awards in Bharatnatyam.

== Professional career ==
Her first feature film, Alo, was released in 2003, where she plays a supporting role. She started as the anchor of non-fiction, student-based show in Tara Bangla named Syllabus-e nei. In 2007, she played the role of Durga in ETV Bangla's Durge Durgatinashini. She is currently serving as a mentor in Zee Bangla most popular Bengali Dance Reality Show Dance Bangla Dance Season 11.

== Political career ==
She joined the Bharatiya Janata Party on 17 February 2021.

== Personal life ==
She wed Ayan Ghosh, a banking professional in December 2012 in an arranged marriage.

== Films ==
- Alo (2003) - supporting
- Gyarakal (2004) - Disha, second lead
- Sangram (2005) - second lead
- Asha (2006) - lead
- Agnishapath (2006)
- Bajimaat (2008) - supporting
- U-Turn (2010) - lead
- Agnisakshi (2010) - supporting
- Teen Tanaya (2011) - supporting
- Sudhu Tomake Chai (2013) - lead (Dipa)

== Television ==
- Jhum Ta Ra Ra (Zee Bangla)
- Syllabus-e nei (Tara Bangla)
- Kon Kanoner Phool (Zee Bangla)
- Somoy (Ruposhi Bangla)
- Byomkesh (Colors Bangla)
- Joy Baba Lokenath (Zee Bangla, 2018-19) (later replaced by Srabanti Malakar)
- Ramprasad (Star Jalsha, 2023)
- Parineeta as Poushali (Zee Bangla, 2024 - Present)

== Mahalaya ==
- 2007 ETV(Colors) Bangla Mahalaya Devi Mahisasurmardini
- 2008 DD Bangla Mahalaya Devi Mahisasurmardini

== Awards ==
- 2026: Zee Bangla Sonar Sansar- Priyo Bhinyo Swader Choritro (Mohila) as Poushali in Parineeta

== Reality Shows ==
- Rannaghor (Zee Bangla)
- Didi No. 1 (Zee Bangla)
- Dance Bangla Dance as Mentor(Zee Bangla)
