= Dada Thakur (2001 film) =

2001 film by Haranath Chakraborty

- Poster
- Directed by: Haranath Chakraborty
- Starring: Ferdous Ahmed; Ranjit Mallick; Victor Banerjee; Arpita Pal; Laboni Sarkar; Anamika Saha; Rajesh Sharma; Tota Roy Chowdhury
- Music by: Babul Bose
- Distributed by: Shree Venkatesh Films
- Release date: 27 December 2001
- Country: India
- Language: Bengali
- Budget: ₹80 lakh

Dada Thakur (Bengali: দাদাঠাকুর) (2001) is a Bengali drama film directed by Haranath Chakraborty. It is based on a Telugu film named Sneham Kosam (Hindi dubbed Main Hoon Rakhwala), which is itself a remake of the 1998 Tamil film Natpukkaga. It stars Ferdous Ahmed, Victor Banerjee and Arpita Pal in lead roles.

== Cast ==
- Ferdous Ahmed as Raja
- Arpita Pal as Mita
- Victor Banerjee as Rabindra Chowdhury aka Dada Thakur
- Ranjit Mallick as Sarathi
- Tota Roy Chowdhury as Rathin Roy
- Rajesh Sharma as Jyotin Roy
- Laboni Sarkar as Geeta
- Anamika Saha as Raja's grandmother
- Subhasish Mukherjee as Bhola
- Shyamal Dutta as Nibaran Dutta

== Soundtrack ==
Music was composed by Babul Bose. All songs were written by Gautam Sushmit. Udit Narayan, Kavita Krishnamurthy, Kumar Sanu, Babul Supriyo and Sadhana Sargam voiced the film.

No.	Title	Singer(s)	Length
1.	"Ei Matitey Jonmo Ore Matitey"	Babul Supriyo	05:44
2.	"Eki Bhalolaga Aki Prem"	Sadhana Sargam	06:00
3.	"Love Love Mane Pyaar"	Udit Narayan, Kavita Krishnamurthy	04:56
4.	"Na Jene Korechi Bhul"	Kumar Sanu	05:24
5.	"O Chand Aamar Ki Aporadh"	Kumar Sanu	05:23
6.	"Tomar Janno Jano (sad)"	Kumar Sanu	01:21
Total length:			28:09
