= Debika Mitra =

Indian actress

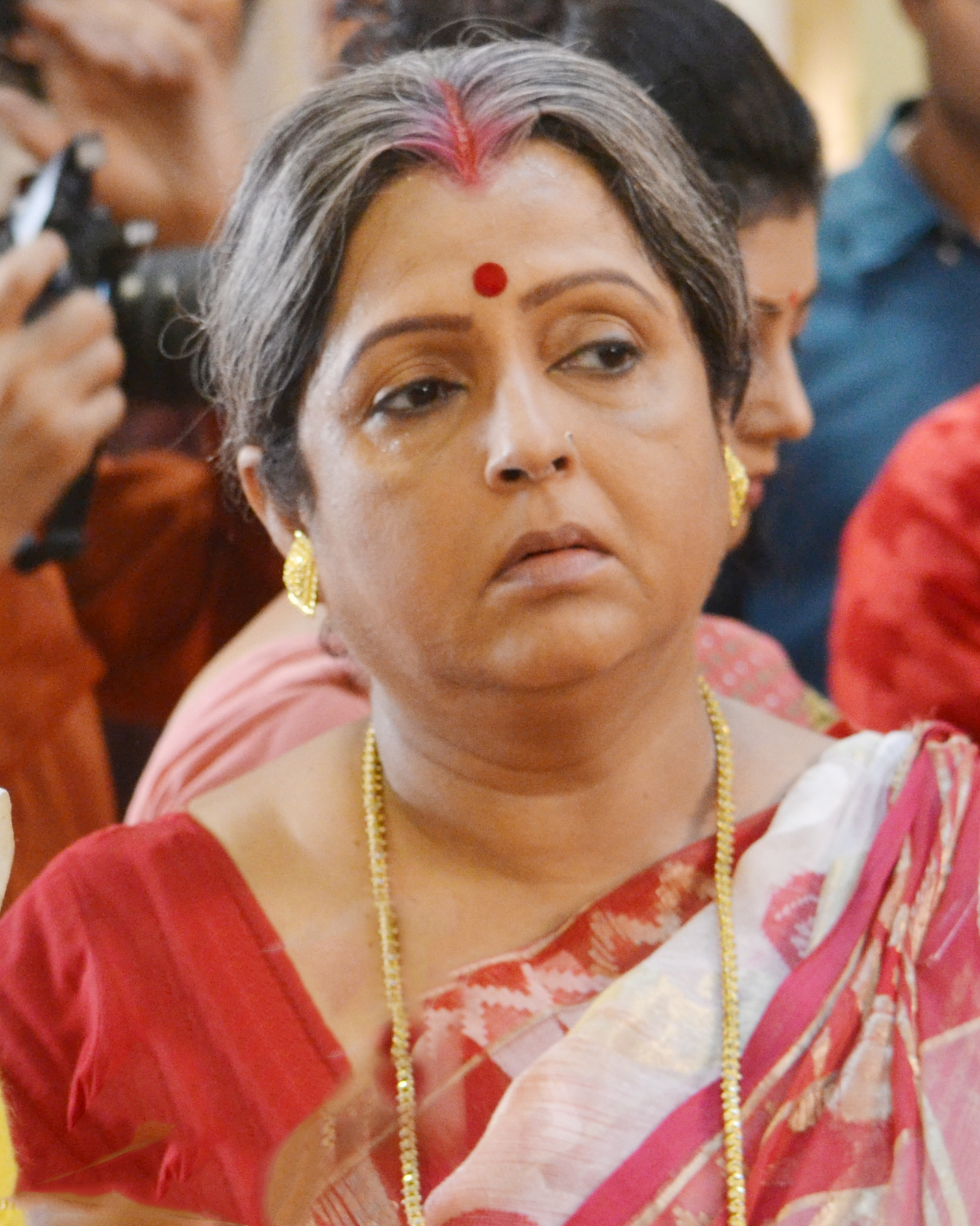
- Occupation: Actress
- Known for: Shatru (2011); Byatikrami (2003); Matribhumi (1997)

Debika Mitra is an Indian Bengali film actress. She works in Bengali films and television shows.

== Filmography ==
- Agniswar (1975)
- Ora Charjon (1988)
- Raja Badsha (1990)
- Surer Bhubane (1992)
- Phire Paoa (1993)
- Amodini (1995)
- Mukhyamantri (1996)
- Lathi (1996)
- Matribhumi (1997)
- Bidroho (1997)
- Tomay Pabo Bole (1999)
- Swashurbari Zindabad (2000)
- Shatruta (2000)
- Mayna (2000)
- Joy Maa Durga (2000)
- Harjit (2000)
- Bhalobashar Chhoan (2000)
- Ostad (2001)
- Mastermasai (2001)
- Ebong Tumi Aar Ami (2001)
- Dadathakur (2001)
- Protarak (2002)
- Sathihara (2006)
- Byatikromi (2006)
- Neel Akasher Chandni (2009)
- Mahanagari (2010)
- Shatru (2011)
- Bhalobasa Antaheen (2013)

== Television ==
- Tapur Tupur (2011-2013)
- Raage Anuraage
- Joyee
