= Swapan Guha =

Indian entrepreneur

- Born: 1957 (age 68–69); Kolkata, India
- Occupation: Entrepreneur
- Awards: Padma Shri; Madan Gopal Bhagat Award; Prof. Sasadhar Roy Memorial Award
- Website: www.hopewelltableware.com

Swapan Guha is an Indian entrepreneur and a Fellow of the Indian Institute of Ceramics, known for his expertise in ceramic industry. He was honored by the Government of India, in 2012, with the fourth highest Indian civilian award of Padma Shri.

== Biography ==
Swapan Guha was born in 1957 in Kolkata in the Indian state of West Bengal and, after graduation, started his career as a Research and Development Officer at Kerala Ceramics Limited, a Government of Kerala undertaking. In 1988, he moved to Bharat Potteries Limited, Jaipur as a Technical Advisor where he is reported to have introduced Bone China to their product range. The next move was to NCL Industries as the General Manager. Afterwards, he had an opportunity to commission a bone china unit, Bharat Potteries Limited, in Jaipur which was accomplished in 9 months where he worked as the chief executive and director. After leaving Bharat Potteries, Guha founded Hopewell Ceramics in Jaipur in 2002 and later Nagarjuna Cerachem and Kalpataru Ceraware, his own ventures, collectively employing over 1200 people in the villages of Rajawas, Jetpura and Govindgarh.

Guha is a former president of the Indian Ceramic Society and is the founder chairman of its Jaipur chapter. He serves as a member of the ceramics committee of Bureau of Indian Standards. He is also an advisor to the Technology Information, Forecasting and Assessment Council (TIFAC), Department of Science and Technology, Government of India. He lives at Vaishali Nagar in Jaipur.

== Awards and recognitions ==
Swapan Guha is a recipient of Madan Gopal Bhagat Award (1998) of the All India Potter Manufacturer's Association and Prof. Sasadhar Roy Memorial Award (1999) of the Indian Ceramic Society. In 2012, Guha was honored by the Government of India with the civilian honour of Padma Shri.
