= 3rd Filmfare Awards East =

Award ceremony for Bengali language films

- Date: 17 February 2018
- Site: Science City, Kolkata
- Hosted by: Parambrata Chatterjee; Abir Chatterjee
- Official website: Filmfare Awards East 2018

Highlights
- Best Film: Bishorjan
- Best Critic: Mayurakshi
- Most awards: Bishorjan (6); Projapoti Biskut (6)
- Most nominations: Bishorjan (14)

Television coverage
- Network: Colors Tv Bangla

3rd Filmfare Awards East ceremony, presented by the Filmfare Magazine, honored the best Bengali language Indian films of 2017. The ceremony was held on 17 February 2018 and was co-hosted by Parambrata Chatterjee and Abir Chatterjee. Films that were notably recognized were Bishorjan, which won six awards including Best Film and Best Director; Projapoti Biskut, which won six awards; and Mayurakshi, which won four awards, including Best Film (Critics' Choice).

== Winners and nominees ==
=== Main awards ===
The nominees for the 3rd Filmfare Awards East were announced on 13 February 2018.

Best Film	Best Director
Bishorjan; Amazon Obhijaan; Bibaho Diaries; Maacher Jhol; Mayurakshi; Sahaj Paather Gappo	Kaushik Ganguly - Bishorjan; Atanu Ghosh - Mayurakshi; Kamaleswar Mukherjee - Cockpit; Manas Mukul Pal - Sahaj Paather Gappo; Pratim D. Gupta - Maacher Jhol; Shiboprosad Mukherjee and Nandita Roy - Posto
Best Actor	Best Actress
Prosenjit Chatterjee - Mayurakshi; Prosenjit Chatterjee - Yeti Obhijaan; Jeet - Boss 2; Dev - Chaamp; Jisshu Sengupta - Posto; Ritwick Chakraborty - Bibaho Diaries; Soumitra Chatterjee - Mayurakshi	Jaya Ahsan - Bishorjan; Ishaa Saha - Projapoti Biskut; Rukmini Maitra - Cockpit; Swastika Mukherjee - Asamapto; Sohini Sarkar - Bibaho Diaries
Best Supporting Actor	Best Supporting Actress
Kaushik Ganguly - Bishorjan; Abir Chatterjee - Meghnad Badh Rahasya; Bratya Basu - Asamapto; Paran Bandopadhyay - Posto; Riddhi Sen - Samantaral; Aryann Bhowmik - Yeti Obhijaan	Mamata Shankar - Maacher Jhol; Arjaa Bannerjee - Dhananjay; Lily Chakravarty - Posto; Sneha Biswas - Sahaj Paather Gappo; Tonushree Chakraborty - Durga Sohay
Best Music Director	Best Lyricist
Anindya Chatterjee, Anupam Roy, Shantanu Moitra and Prasenjit Mukherjee - Projapoti Biskut; Savvy Gupta - Bibaho Diaries; Late Kalika Prasad Bhattacharya - Bishorjan; Anupam Roy - Maacher Jhol; Anupam Roy and Anindya Chatterjee - Posto; Indraadip Das Gupta - Samantaral; Indraadip Das Gupta - Yeti Obhijaan	Ritam Sen - "Tomake Bujhina Priyo" - Projapoti Biskut; Anindya Chatterjee - "Jonaki" - Posto; Anupam Roy - "Dawttok" - Maacher Jhol; Debojyoti Mishra - "Tomra Ekhono Ki" - Meghnad Badh Rahasya; Sharmin Sultana Sumi - "Ahare Jibon" - Doob; Srijato - "Dyakha Howbe Bole" - Samantaral
Best Playback Singer - Male	Best Playback Singer - Female
Nachiketa Chakraborty - "Keno Erokom Kichhu Holo Na" - Posto; Anindya Chatterjee - "Jonaki" - Posto; Anupam Roy and Saheb Chatterjee - "Je Tore Pagol Bole" - Maacher Jhol; Arijit Singh - "Maula Re" - Chaamp; Arijit Singh - "Tui Chunli Jakhan" - Samantaral; Anupam Roy - "Dawttok" - Maacher Jhol	Chandrani Banerjee - "Tomake Bujhina Priyo" - Projapoti Biskut; Iman Chakraborty - "Bhalo Koira Bajao Go" - Durga Sohay; Lagnajita Chakraborty - "E Bhabe Golpo Hok" - Bibaho Diaries; Nikhita Gandhi - "Tomra Ekhono Ki" - Meghnad Badh Rahasya; Sharmin Sultana Sumi - "Ahare Jibon" - Doob; Shreya Ghoshal - "Tui Chunli Jakhan" - Samantaral
Best Debut Male	Best Debut Female
Nur Islam - Sahaj Paather Gappo; Samiul Alam - Sahaj Paather Gappo; Aditya Sengupta – Projapoti Biskut; Arghya Basu Roy - Posto	Rukmini Maitra - Chaamp, Cockpit; Anusha Vishwanathan - Durga Sohay; Arjaa Baneerjee - Dhananjay; Ida Dasgupta - Shob Bhooturey; Ishaa Saha – Projapoti Biskut

=== Critics' awards ===
Best Film (Best Director)
Mayurakshi - Atanu Ghosh; Bishorjan - Kaushik Ganguly; Meghnad Badh Rahasya - Anik Dutta; Raktokorobi - Amitava Bhattacharya; Samantaral - Partha Chakraborty; Sahaj Paather Gappo - Manas Mukul Pal
Best Actor	Best Actress
Soumitra Chatterjee - Mayurakshi; Anirban Bhattacharya - Dhananjay; Dhritiman Chatterjee - Chitrokar; Irrfan Khan - Doob; Jisshu Sengupta - Byomkesh O Agnibaan; Parambrata Chatterjee - Samantaral	Ishaa Saha - Projapoti Biskut; Arpita Chatterjee - Chitrokar; Jaya Ahsan - Bishorjan; Sohini Sarkar - Durga Sohay

==== Technical Awards ====
Best Story	Best Screenplay
Kaushik Ganguly - Bishorjan; Atanu Ghosh – Mayurakshi; Pratim D. Gupta - Maacher Jhol; Tarak Nath Saha - Samantaral	Manas Mukul Pal - Sahaj Paather Gappo; Anindya Chatterjee - Projapoti Biskut; Kaushik Ganguly – Bishorjan; Pratim D. Gupta - Maacher Jhol; Saurav Palodhi and Mainak Bhaumik - Bibaho Diaries
Best Dialogue	Best Editing
Pratim D. Gupta - Maacher Jhol; Anik Dutta and Utsab Mukherjee - Meghnad Badh Rahasya; Kaushik Ganguly – Bishorjan; Manas Mukul Pal - Sahaj Paather Gappo; Saurav Palodhi - Bibaho Diaries	Sujay Dutta Roy and Anirban Maity - Sahaj Paather Gappo; Arghya Kamal Mitra - Meghnad Badh Rahasya; Arghya Kamal Mitra - Byomkesh O Agnibaan; Pronoy Dasgupta - Bibaho Diaries
Best Background Score	Best Cinematography
Debojyoti Mishra - Mayurakshi; Chandradip Goswami - Sahaj Paather Gappo; Debojyoti Mishra - Meghnad Badh Rahasya; Indraadip Dasgupta – Bishorjan; Joy Sarkar - Bilu Rakkhosh; Pavel Areen - Doob	Supriyo - Projapoti Biskut; Supratim Bhol - Sahaj Paather Gappo; Sheikh Rajibul Islam – Doob; Shubhankar Bhar - Maacher Jhol; Soumik Haldar - Mayurakshi; Soumik Haldar - Yeti Obhijaan; Souvik Basu – Bishorjan
Best Production Design	Best Sound Design
Madhuja Bannerjee and Kaushik-Barik - Projapoti Biskut; Amit Chatterjee - Bibaho Diaries; Gautam Basu – Bishorjan; Indranil Ghosh – Meghnad Badh Rahasya; Saswati Karmakar - Maacher Jhol; Soumik Haldar, Sabarni Das and Arindam Sil - Dhananjay	Anirban Sengupta - Bishorjan; Anindit Roy and Adeep Singh Manki - Bibaho Diaries; Anindit Roy and Adeep Singh Manki - Maacher Jhol; Anirban Sengupta – Mayurakshi; Manas Mukul Pal, Amit Kumar Dutta and Dipankar Chaki - Sahaj Paather Gappo

==== Special awards ====
Lifetime Achievement Award
- Mrinal Sen
- Sabitri Chatterjee

==== Multiple Nominations ====
- Bishorjan - 14
- Maacher Jhol - 13
- Sahaj Paather Gappo - 12
- Bibaho Diaries - 10
- Mayurakshi - 10
- Projapoti Biskut - 10
- Posto - 9
- Samantaral - 8
- Meghnad Badh Rahasya - 8
- Doob - 5
- Durga Sohay - 4
- Dhananjay - 4
- Chaamp - 3
- Cockpit - 3
- Byomkesh O Agnibaan - 2
- Asamapto - 2

==== Multiple Awards ====
- Bishorjan - 6
- Projapoti Biskut - 6
- Mayurakshi - 4
- Sahaj Paather Gappo - 4
- Maacher Jhol - 2
