= Mayurakshi =

2017 Bengali film directed by Atanu Ghosh

- Release poster
- Directed by: Atanu Ghosh
- Written by: Atanu Ghosh
- Screenplay by: Atanu Ghosh
- Story by: Atanu Ghosh
- Produced by: Firdausul Hasan & Probal Halder
- Starring: Soumitra Chatterjee; Prosenjit Chatterjee; Indrani Halder; Sudipta Chakraborty; Gargi Roychowdhury
- Cinematography: Soumik Haldar
- Edited by: Sujay Datta Ray
- Music by: Debojyoti Mishra
- Distributed by: Friends Communication
- Release date: 29 December 2017
- Running time: 102 mins
- Country: India
- Language: Bengali

Mayurakshi is a 2017 Bengali film directed by Atanu Ghosh and produced by Firdausal Hassan & Probal Halder for Friends Communication. The music was composed by Debojyoti Mishra. The film won the award for Best Bengali feature film at the 65th National Film Awards.

== Plot ==
In the modern world, with work pressures and financial woes mounting, isolation and stress becoming an integral part of life, most people believe that father and son bonding is becoming a thing of the past.

Mayurakshi narrates an intensely emotional tale of an 84-year-old father Sushovan, a brilliant former professor of history, presently suffering from age related neurological problems including dementia and cognitive dysfunction. His middle-aged son Aryanil visits him, an intimately sensitive man going through an unsettling phase in his personal life. Though deeply attached to his father, Aryanil is settled in Chicago, USA, and as such cut off from the soul who shaped his life. Within a five-day span of reunion, lost chapters get curiously reopened and incidents long buried suddenly turn relevant. Few days become more eventful than years and through the process of confrontation with aging and destiny, Aryanil seeks hope and sustenance in his own life.

== Cast ==
- Soumitra Chatterjee as Sushovan
- Prosenjit Chatterjee as Aryanil
- Indrani Halder as Sahana
- Sudipta Chakraborty as Mallika
- Gargi Roychowdhury as Paromita

== Awards and festivals ==
- NATIONAL AWARD

Best Bengali Feature Film

- SINGAPORE SOUTH ASIAN INTERNATIONAL FILM FESTIVAL

Best Movie Award
Best Screenplay Award

- CHITRA BHARATHI

Best Indian Cinema Award

- WBFJA

Best Film
Best Actor (Soumitra Chatterjee)
Best Actor (Prosenjit Chatterjee)

- FILMFARE

Best Film (Critics)
Best Actor - Critics (Soumitra Chatterjee)
Best Actor - Popular (Prosenjit Chatterjee)
Best Background Score (Debojyoti Mishra)

- Hyderabad Bengali Film Festival

== See also ==
- Angshumaner Chhobi
- Takhan Teish
- Rupkatha Noy
- Abby Sen
