= Pijush Ganguly =

Indian Bengali actor

- Born: 2 January 1965; Kolkata, West Bengal, India
- Died: 25 October 2015 (aged 50); Kolkata, West Bengal
- Occupation: Actor

Pijush Ganguly (2 January 1965 – 25 October 2015) was a noted Bengali film, television and theater actor. In 2005, he received the Bengal Film Journalists' Association Award for the Best Actor in a Supporting Role for his performance in Mahulbanir Sereng.

== Career ==
Pijush Ganguly started his career as an employee of NABARD but later moved on to pursue a career in acting. He started acting out of passion in the stages of Kolkata. He was actively involved with the Bengali Theatre scene and performed in various plays. During his career, he worked with notable thespians such as Bratya Basu, Bibhas Chakraborty, Arun Mukherjee and Ramaprasad Banik, among others.

Ganguly was a well established and popular actor in the Bengali television industry. He appeared in television programmes and films under the direction of the likes of Anjan Dutt, Kaushik Ganguly, Aparna Sen, and others.

He was a well-known face in television serials from the mid-1990s till his death in 2015. He started his television career with Abar Jakher Dhan. Some of his popular TV serials included Jol Nupur, Abar Jokher Dhon, Arakshaniya, and Amodini. He hosted the reality show Ma vs Bouma. He also acted in popular films like the drama Laptop, the mystery Byomkesh Bakshi, and the period romance Iti Srikanta.

== Early and personal life ==
Pijush Ganguly was born in Balananda Hospital, Behala (Kolkata), in 1965 where he resided. He held two bachelor's degrees, in commerce and arts from the University of Calcutta.

During his school and college days, he had been a prolific goalkeeper and may have pursued a career in the sport, if not for an accident.

He married Pamela Ganguly and has a son. He loved painting and had a keen interest in Manna Dey's music.

== Death ==
Ganguly died on 25 October 2015 at 2:45am, at Belle Vue Clinic, Kolkata. He died of "multi-organ failure and fat embolism in a case polytrauma" after he got into a road accident on 20 October 2015. His MUV collided head-on with a bus at Santragachi in Howrah district on 20 October when he was returning to the city after a show.

== Filmography ==
- Amodini (1994) (directed by Chidananda Dasgupta)
- Gosaipur Sargaram (1996) (directed by Sandip Ray)
- Matribhumi (1997) (directed by Milan Bhowmik)
- Baba Keno Chakar (1998) (directed by Swapan Saha)
- Mahulbanir Sereng (2004) (directed by Shekhar Das)
- Iti Srikanta (2004) (directed by Anjan Das)
- Madly Bangali (2004) (directed by Anjan Dutt)
- Bhalobasar Onek Naam (2006)
- Angshumaner Chhobi (2009) (directed by Atanu Ghosh)
- Byomkesh Bakshi (2010) (directed by Anjan Dutt)
- Autograph (film) (2010) (directed by Srijit Mukherji)
- Dashami (2012) (directed by Suman Moitra)
- Abar Byomkesh (2012) (directed by Anjan Dutt)
- Laptop (2012) (directed by Kaushik Ganguly)
- Aborto(2013) (directed by Arindam Sil)
- Goynar Baksho (2013) (directed by Aparna Sen)
- Basanta Utsav (2013) (directed by Rhitobrata Bhattacharya)
- Chaar (2014) (directed by Sandip Ray)

== Awards ==
- 1991 Pramathesh Barua Award
- 1996 Shyamal Sen Smriti Samman
- 2005 Bengal Film Journalists' Association Award
- 2008 Sangbad Pratidin Complan Tele Samman
- 2014 Government of West Bengal (Information and Cultural Affairs) Tele Academy Award
- 2014 Shailajananda Smarak Chalachitra Samman
