= Abby Sen =

2015 Indian Bengali film

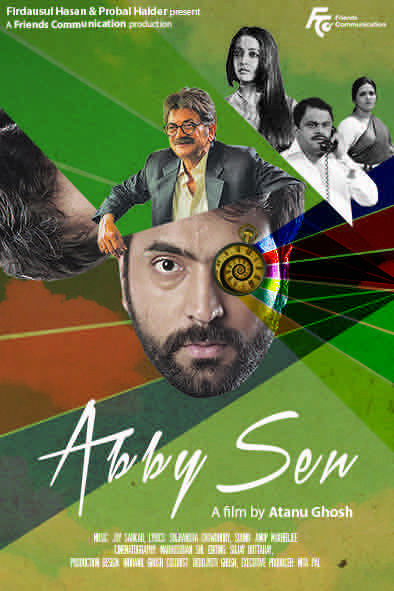
- Abby Sen Theatrical Release Poster
- Directed by: Atanu Ghosh
- Written by: Atanu Ghosh
- Story by: Atanu Ghosh
- Produced by: Firdausul Hasan; Probal Halder
- Starring: Abir Chatterjee; Raima Sen; Chiranjeet Chakraborty; Arunima Ghosh; Bratya Basu; Priyanka Sarkar; Kanchan Mullick; Neel Mukherjee; Biswanath Basu; Paran Bandopadhyay; Kharaj Mukherjee
- Cinematography: Madhusudan Shi
- Edited by: Sujay Datta Ray
- Music by: Joy Sarkar
- Distributed by: Friends Communication
- Release date: 30 October 2015
- Running time: 127 Minutes
- Country: India
- Language: Bengali

Abby Sen is a 2015 Bengali science fiction comedy film directed by Atanu Ghosh and produced by Firdausul Hassan and Probal Halder. It features Abir Chatterjee, Raima Sen, Chiranjeet Chakraborty, Bratya Basu, and Priyanka Sarkar in lead roles, with Neel Mukherjee, Biswanath Basu, and Bhaswar Chatterjee in supporting roles. The music is composed by Joy Sarkar. It is Atanu Ghosh's fifth feature film after Angshumaner Chhobi, Takhan Teish, Rupkatha Noy, Ek Phaali Rodh and was released 30 October 2015.

== Plot ==
Abby Sen is a 30-year-old television producer. But his programmes on television fail to attract viewers - which why Abby keeps getting fired. This usually drives his wife Somy into hysterics. So Abby has not disclosed his last dismissal to her.

By sheer coincidence, Abby meets a self-styled scientist who claims to have discovered a time-travel capsule. The scientist volunteers to take Abby back in time to when getting a job was not that difficult. But he has certain conditions, which Abby must fulfill. Finding all options bleak, Abby decides to agree to his conditions and travel 33 years back in time, that is, to 1980.

Thereafter, a series of unforeseen incidents and intricacies of relationships make Abby's life in 1980 as eventful as ever. But flung between the two worlds of 1980 and 2013 both in his personal and professional life, Abby represents the predicament of a man struggling to survive in this competitive world.

== Themes ==
The film subtly touches on the theory of chronology protection conjecture. Despite Abby Sen's effort, the past chronology remains unchanged. The director did not venture into the nitty gritty of time travel theory. He rather nicely explained the intricacies, a human relationship can face in case of such event!

== Cast ==
- Abir Chatterjee as Abby Sen
- Raima Sen as Parama
- Chiranjeet Chakraborty as Scientist
- Arunima Ghosh as Somy
- Bratya Basu as Director, Grand Channel
- Priyanka Sarkar as Srirupa
- Kanchan Mullick as Bila
- Neel Mukherjee as Bimbo
- Biswanath Basu as Jatin
- Bhaswar Chatterjee as Samik
- Paran Bandopadhyay as Dhiraj
- Kharaj Mukherjee as Hiran

== Soundtrack ==
The music and background score for the film is composed by Joy Sarkar.

No.	Title	Lyrics	Music	Singer(s)	Length
1.	"Moneri Majhe Jeno"	Suchandra Chowdhury	Joy Sarkar	Arijit Singh	4:57
2.	"Eka Eka"	Suchandra Chowdhury	Joy Sarkar	Rupankar Bagchi and Anweshaa	4:48
3.	"Taake Khunji"	Suchandra Chowdhury	Joy Sarkar	Anweshaa	4:08
Total length:					13:53

== Reception ==
=== Critical reception ===
Upam Buzarbaruah of The Times of India rated the film 3/5 stars and wrote "The film just seems to float through life and time, never delving deep into anything. As a result, the film seems just as mindless as maybe a larger-than-life south remake. The story just grazes the surface — be it the people shown in the film or the science behind time travel. Overall, Abby Sen is a film you should watch for the great performances."
