= Ek Phaali Rodh =

2014 Indian Bengali film

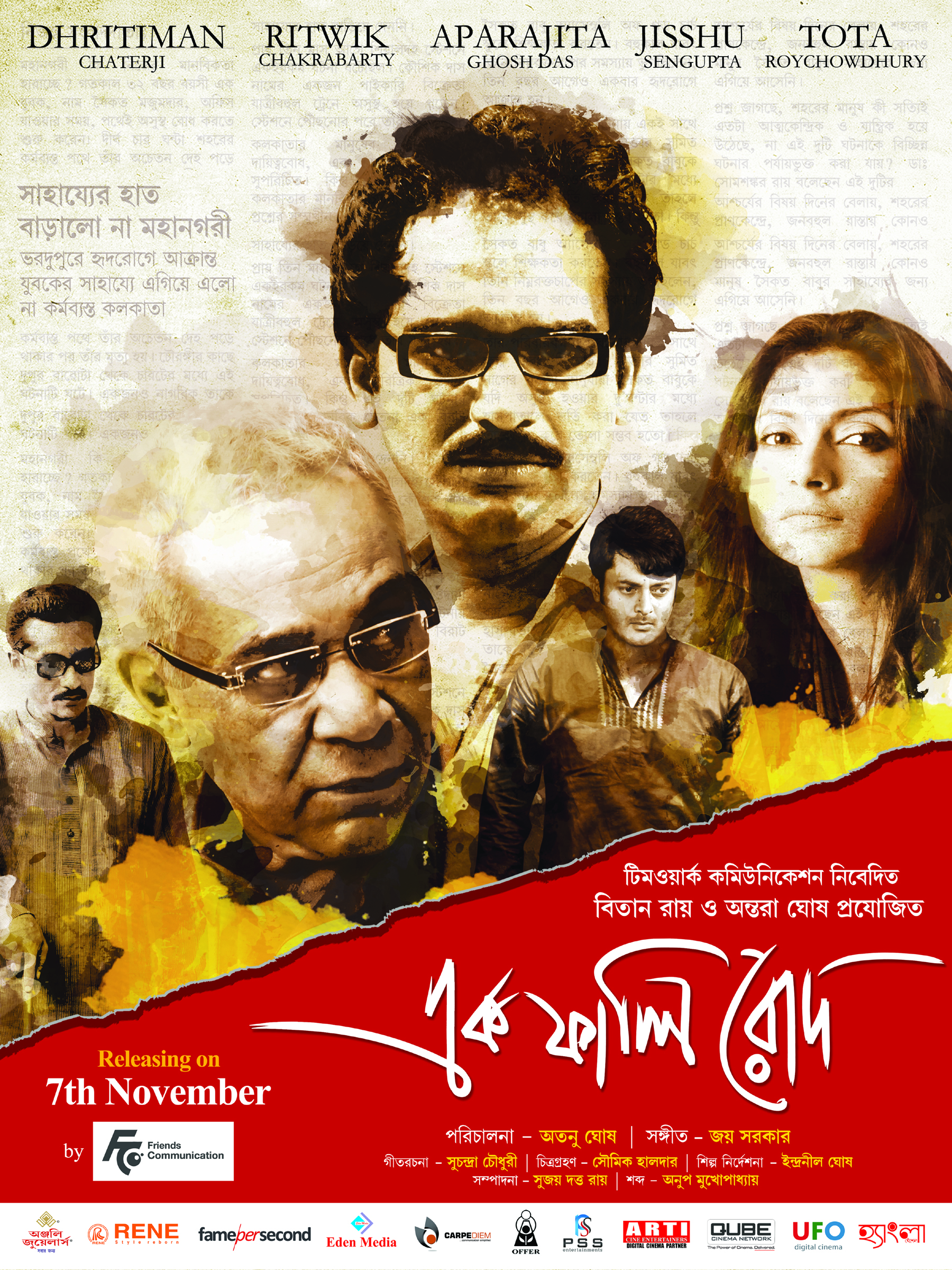
- Directed by: Atanu Ghosh
- Written by: Atanu Ghosh
- Produced by: Bitan Roy; Antara Ghosh
- Starring: Dhritiman Chatterjee; Ritwick Chakraborty; Aparajita Ghosh Das; Tota Roychowdhury; Arunima Ghosh; Dulal Lahiri; Rudranil Ghosh; Mahua Halder; Barun Chanda; Jisshu Sengupta
- Cinematography: Soumik Haldar
- Edited by: Sujoy Dutta Ray
- Music by: Joy Sarkar
- Release date: 21 June 2014 (Shanghai)
- Running time: 107 minutes
- Country: India
- Language: Bengali

Ek Phaali Rodh (English: A Ray of Light) is a 2014 Bengali film directed by Atanu Ghosh and produced by Bitan Roy and Antara Ghosh for Teamwork Communication. The music is composed by Joy Sarkar. It is Atanu Ghosh's fourth feature film after Angshumaner Chhobi, Takhan Teish and Rupkatha Noy.

== Plot ==
Dr. Somshankar Roy, a social scientist, engages two young people Swagato and Anwesha to create ‘mock’ crisis on the streets. The aim was to observe reactions of people to different forms of crisis happening around them, and to analyse and derive conclusions on Bystander effect from them. Anwesha is a post-graduate in sociology and comes from a well-to-do family. She is engaged to JOY, a celebrity singer. Swagato hails from a middle-class family, has a diploma in journalism but never got a decent job. Swagato has a steady relation with RUPA, who resides in a colony. Days back, Rupa’s mother has been diagnosed to be suffering from cancer. Now they are in acute crisis as Rupa’s mother is the only earning member of the family. PRATIM GUHA, a blind writer of love stories learns about Dr. Roy’s experiment, finds it quite interesting and involves himself with the project in pursuit of a plot. Pratim is dynamic and wants to live life on his own terms. But he is also intensely romantic and emotional. He lends yet another dimension to the curious relationship developing between the six people, namely Somshankar, Anwesha, Swagato, Joy, Rupa and Pratim. But all theories and deductions go astray when one of them suddenly goes missing and the rest cannot decipher whether the crisis is mock or real.

== World Premiere ==
Ek Phaali Rodh (A Ray of light) had its World Premiere at the Shanghai International Film Festival in June 2014.

== Cast ==
- Dhritiman Chatterjee as Dr. Somshankar Roy
- Ritwick Chakraborty as Swagato
- Aparajita Ghosh Das as Anwesha
- Jisshu Sengupta as Joy
- Tota Roychowdhury as Pratim
- Mahua Halder as Rupa
- Arunima Ghosh as Mimi
- Barun Chanda as Rajat Gupta
