= Aparajita Ghosh Das =

Bengali film and television actress (born 1970)

- Born: Kolkata, West Bengal, India
- Occupation: Actress
- Known for: Ekhane Aakash Neel; Kojagori; Kusum Dola
- Spouse: Ritwick Chakraborty

Aparajita Ghosh Das (born 21 March 1978) is an Indian actress who works in Bengali language films and television series. She made her film debut in Anjan Das's film Iti Srikanta (2004). She appeared in Anjan Dutt's film Chalo Let's Go (2008).

== Early life ==
She studied at the reputed school Patha Bhavan in Kolkata. She completed her post-graduation from Rabindra Bharati University.

== Filmography ==
- Rajlokkhi o Shrikanto (2019)
- Posto (2017)
- Bhengchi (2015) - as Malabika Sengupta (a.k.a. Molly)
- Ek Phaali Rodh (2014)
- Bakita Byaktigoto (2013) - as Shampa
- Takhan Teish (2011)
- Haate Roilo Pistol (2011)
- Ektu Antorikotar Jonno (2010)
- Chowrasta - Crossroads of Love (2009)
- 10:10 (2008)
- Chalo Let's Go (2008)
- Raat Barota Panch (2005) - as Tina
- Iti Srikanta (2004)

== Television & Web ==
- Ekdin Pratidin (2005–07) as Mohor
- Bijoyini (2007) - as Bhromor
- Ekhane Aakash Neel (2008–10) - as Hiya Chatterjee (née O'Brien)
- Checkmate (2012) - as Detective Mrinalini Dostidar
- Kojagori (2015–16) - as Kojagori Mallick (a.k.a. Phuljhuri)
- Kusum Dola (2016–18) - as Roopkatha Majumdar (a.k.a. Doll)
- Ulot Puran (2022) - as Pompi
- Ekka Dokka (2022–23) - as Ankita Majumdar
- Homestay Murders (2023) - as Mita
- Chirosokha (2025–2026) - as Kamalini (a.k.a. Bouthan)

== Awards ==
Year	Award	Category	Character	Film/TV show
2011	Star Jalsha Parivaar Awards 2011	Priyo Juti	Hiya-Ujaan	Ekhane Aakash Neel
2016	Zee Bangla Sonar Sansar 2016	Priyo Bouma	Phuljhuri	Kojagori
2016	West Bengal Telly Academy Award	Priyo Juti	Phuljhuri-Saheb	Kojagori
2018	Star Jalsha Parivaar Awards 2018	Domdaar Sodosyo (Female)	Roopkatha	Kusum Dola
2025	West Bengal Telly Academy Award	Priyo Juti	Komolini-Swatantra	Chirosokha
2025	TV 9 Bangla Ghorer Bioscope Award	Best Pair TV Serial (Jury)	Komolini-Swatantra	Chirosokha
2025	TV 9 Bangla Ghorer Bioscope Award	Best Actress in Leading Role TV Serial (Jury)	Komolini	Chirosokha
2026	Star Jalsha Parivaar Awards 2026	Priyo Maa	Komolini	Chirosokha
2026	Star Jalsha Parivaar Awards 2026	Star Bouma	Komolini	Chirosokha
2026	Star Jalsha Parivaar Awards 2026	Priyo Misti Somporko	Komolii-Kurchi	Chirosokha
