= Indrani Haldar =

Indian film and television actress

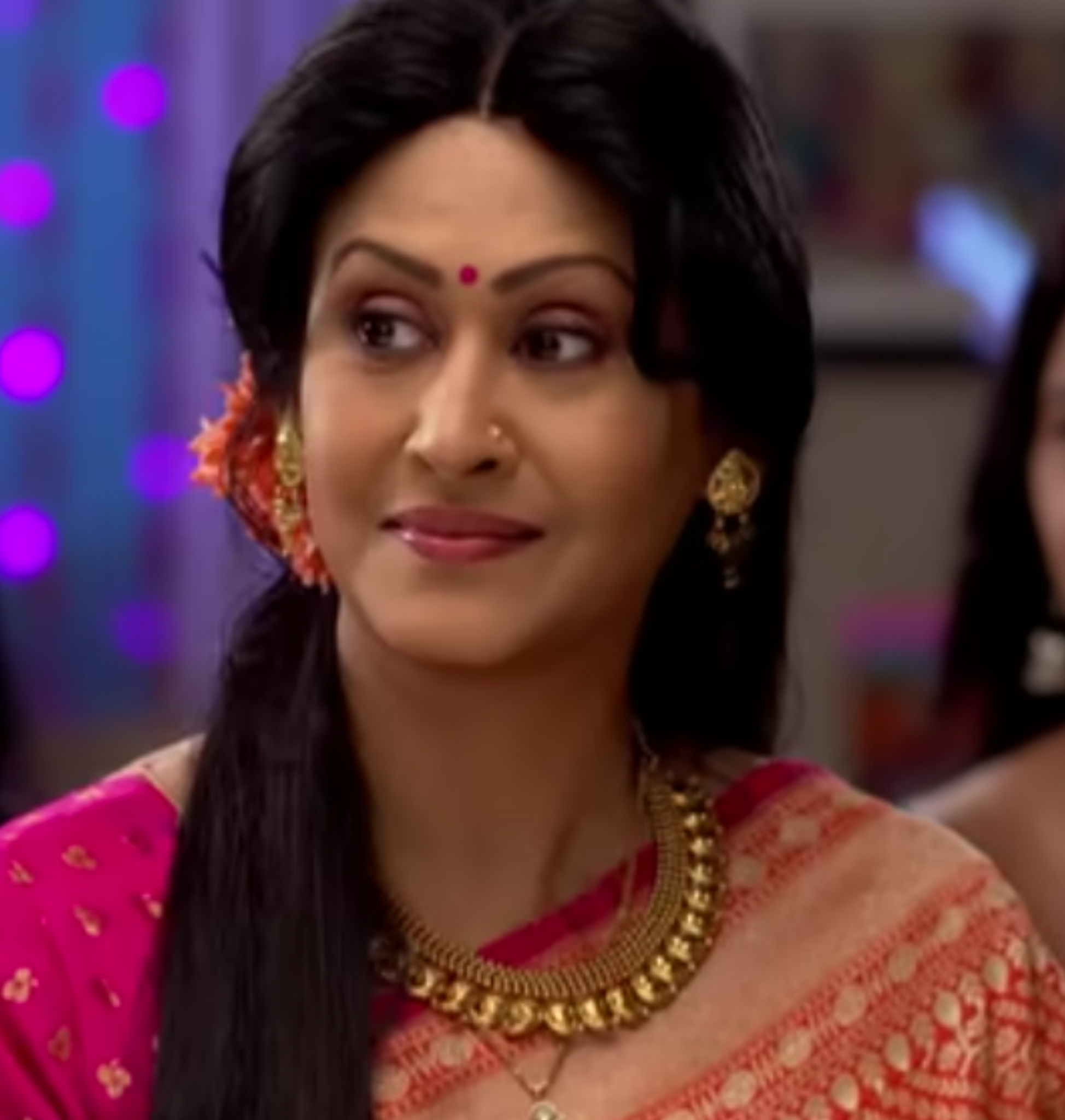
- Born: 6 January 1971 (age 55); Calcutta, West Bengal, India
- Occupation: Actress
- Years active: 1986–present
- Notable work: Biyer Phool, Mayurakshi, Sreemoyee,
- Spouse: Bhaskar Roy
- Awards: BFJA Awards, Anandalok Awards

Indrani Haldar is an Indian actress who is mostly known for her work in Bengali cinema. She was conferred with a National Award, three BFJA Awards and two Anandalok Awards.

Halder made her debut in 1986 with the Bengali TV series Tero Parbon directed by Jochon Dastidar. She made her big screen debut opposite Prosenjit Chatterjee in Mandira (1990). She has appeared in numerous films, telefilms and TV series and hit the pinnacle of her career with the Bengali TV series Goyenda Ginni. She appeared in critically acclaimed films such as Charachar, Dahan, Anu, Sajhbatir Rupkathara, Faltu, Tokhon Teish, Mayurakshi to name a few. She has also worked at Maa Shakti by BR Chopra.

== Career ==
Indrani made her acting debut in the television serial Tero Parban (1986). She lived in Mumbai during 2008 to 2013 to act in Hindi TV serials.

In January 2022, she sang the Dwijendralal Ray song "Dhono Dhanne Pushpe Bhora" in a show at the request of one. However, she thought it is Rabindranath Tagore's song. And so she was trolled on social media.

== Filmography ==
Year	Title	Role	Notes	Ref.
1990	Abishkar			
1990	Debata			
1990	Mandira			
1991	Debor			
1991	Neelimay Neel			
1992	Dan Pratidan			
1992	Shwet Patharer Thala			
1993	Kaancher Prithibi			
1993	Kanyadan			
1993	Charachar			
1993	Tapasya			
1993	Prem Sanghat			
1994	Biswas Abiswas			
1995	Antartama			
	Jay Bijay			
1996	Biyer Phool	Lily Chatterjee		
1996	Jamaibabu			
1996	Bonophool			
1997	Saptami			
1997	Dahan	Srabani / Jhinuk		
1997	Bhalobasha			
1997	Lal Darja			
1997	Dabidar			
1998	Gharer Laxmi			
1998	Gouri			
1998	Chowdhury Paribar			
1998	Sagar Banya			
1998	Saikat Sangeet			
1998	Anu	Anu		
1998	Nayaner Alo			
1999	Day Dayita			
1999	Sampradaan			
1999	Ebong Tumi Aar Aami			
1999	Dadabhai			
2000	Paromitar Ek Din		Cameo	
2000	Buk Bhara Bhalobasa			
2000	Apon Holo Par			
2001	Dekha			
2001	Bhairav			
2001	Sesh Ashray			
2002	Debdas	Chandramukhi		
2002	Saanjhbatir Roopkathara			
2002	Barkane			
2002	Anandalok			
2004	Atatayee			
2004	Assassin			
2005	Asamapto			
2006	Faltu			
2006	Aankush			
2007	Jara Brishtitey Bhijechhilo			
2007	Raatporir Rupkatha			
2009	Angshumaner Chhobi			
2010	Banshiwala			
2010	Thikana Rajpath			
2010	Antim Swash Sundar			
2010	Antarbash			
2011	Takhan Teish			
2012	Chakravyuha			
2013	Mistake			
2014	Strings of Passion			
2015	Aro Ekbar			
2017	Mayurakshi			
2018	Drishyantar			
2022	Kuler Achaar	Mitali		

== Web series ==
Year	Series	Role	Director	OTT Platform	Notes	Ref.
2021	72 Ghanta	Anjana	Atanu Ghosh	Chorki	Film released om OTT platform due to COVID-19 induced lockdown	
2023	Chhotolok	Mohor Bhattacharya	Indraneel Roy Chowdhury	ZEE5		

== Television series ==
- Seemarekha as Seema and Rekha-Dual role (Zee Bangla)
- Goyenda Ginni as Poroma (Zee Bangla)
- Spandan (Zee Bangla)
- Sreemoyee (Star Jalsha)
- Savitri - EK Prem Kahani as Leena Roy Choudhary (2013)
- Sanjivani
- Maryada: Lekin Kab Tak?
- Tamasharekha (Zee Bangla)
- Jeebon Rekha (Zee Bangla)
- Sujata
- Maa Shakti
- Savitri
- Sanai (Akash Bangla)
- Rajmahal (Aakash Aath)
- Bahnishikha
- Kudrat as Ganga Ajaynarayan Seth

== Telefilms and Short series ==
- Fakir
- Tithir Atithi
- Kuasha Jakhan
- Bahanno Episode(Directed by Rituporno Ghosh)
- Purbo Purush
- Bhool Thikana
- Hamaari Shaadi(Directed by Basu Chatterjee)
- Tero Parban
- Prashchito (NTV Bengali Telefilm)
- Pinzor (NTV Bengali Telefilm)
- Khonik Bosonto (BTV Telefilm), 2002
- Somoy (Rupasi Bangla)
- Kapalkundala

== Reality and Talk shows ==
- Ghore Ghore Zee Bangla (Reality show)- Host (Zee Bangla)
- Sange Indrani - a weekly interview on Tara TV featuring celebrity guests, hosted by Haldar

== Mahalaya ==
Year	Channel	Show Name	Role	Notes
2003	DD Bangla	Maa Elo Oi	Devi Mahisasurmardini	
2016	Zee Bangla	Matrirupeno	Devi Mahisasurmardini	
2017	Zee Bangla	Rupang Dehi Jayang Dehi	Devi Jayanti, Maangala, Kali, Bhadrakali, Kapalini and Mahisasurmardini	
2019	Star Jalsha	Mahisasurmardini	Dance Performance	

== Awards and nominations ==
Year	Award	Category	Character	Film/TV show
1993	Kalakar Awards	Kalakar Award for Best Actress		Tapashya
1996	Bengal Film Journalists' Association Awards	Best Actress	Gouri	Charachar
1997	45th National Film Awards	National Film Award for Best Actress in a Leading Role	Jhinuk	Dahan
1997	Kalakar Awards	Best Actress TV		Tapashya
1998	Kalakar Awards	Best Actress TV		Kuasa Jokhon
1999	Anandalok Puraskar	Anandalok Best Actress Award	Jhinuk	Dahan
2000	Anandalok Puraskar	Anandalok Best Actress Award		Anu
2002	Kalakar Awards	Best Actress TV		Maa Shakti
2003	Bengal Film Journalists' Association Awards	Bengal Film Journalists' Association – Best Actress Award	Sanjhbati	Sanjhbatir Roopkathara
2005	Kalakar Awards	Best Actress TV		Pinjor
2006	Kalakar Awards	Best Actress TV		Bonnisikha
2007	Bengal Film Journalists' Association Awards	Bengal Film Journalists' Association – Best Supporting Actress Award	Suri Khepi	Faltu
2007	Telly Samman	Best Actress		Aaloy Phera
2008	Madrid International Film Festival	Best Actress	Radha	Jara Bristite Bhijechhilo
2009	Kalakar Awards	Best Actress	Sujata	Sujata
2016	Zee Bangla Sonar Sansar Awards 2016	Sera Nayika	Poroma	Goyenda Ginni
2016	Zee Bangla Sonar Sansar Awards 2016	Priyo Bouma	Poroma	Goyenda Ginni
2017	Telly Academy Awards 2017	Sera Nayika	Poroma	Goyenda Ginni
2017	Zee Bangla Sonar Sansar Awards 2017	Priyo Sodosyo	Poroma	Goyenda Ginni
2018	Zee Bangla Sonar Sansar Awards 2018	Sera Kholnayika	Seema	Seemarekha
2018	Zee Bangla Sonar Sansar Awards 2018	Most Versatile Actress	For her contributions to the Bengali Film Industry	—N/a
2019	Telly Academy Awards 2019	Best Actress	Sreemoyee	Sreemoyee
2021	Star Jalsha Parivar Awards 2021	Priyo Maa	Sreemoyee	Sreemoyee
2021	Star Jalsha Parivar Awards 2021	Cholo Paltai	Sreemoyee	Sreemoyee
2022	Telly Awards Bangla	Best Actress in a Leading Role	Sreemoyee	Sreemoyee
2022	Tele Academy Awards 2022	Inspirational Character	Sreemoyee	Sreemoyee
2022	Banga Bhushan		For her contributions to the Bengali Film Industry	—N/a
