= Chandrani =

Chandrani is a given name. Notable people with the name include:

- Chandrani Banerjee, Indian singer
- Chandrani Bandara Jayasinghe, Sri Lankan politician
- Chandrani Mukherjee, Indian playback singer
- Chandrani Murmu (born 1993), Indian politician
