= Jodi Ekdin =

Jodi Ekdin may refer to:

- Jodi Ekdin (2010 film)
- Jodi Ekdin (2019 film)
