= Calcutta Film Society =

Indian film society

- Formation: 5 October 1947
- Purpose: film society
- Location: B-5, Bharat Bhavan 3, Chittaranjan Avenue, Kolkata
- Affiliations: Federation of Film Societies of India

Calcutta Film Society was India’s second film society in the city of Kolkata (then Calcutta), West Bengal, India. It was founded in 1947, just after independence, by Satyajit Ray, Chidananda Dasgupta, Sunil Janah, RP Gupta, Bansi Chandragupta, Harisadhan Dasgupta and others. The 1925 silent film directed by Sergei Eisenstein, The Battleship Potemkin was the first film screened at the film society, which over the years developed the reputation of having the "most cine-literate audiences in the country". It was revived in 1956 with the efforts of stalwarts like Dasgupta, Vijaya Mulay, Diptendu Pramanick and Satyajit Ray.

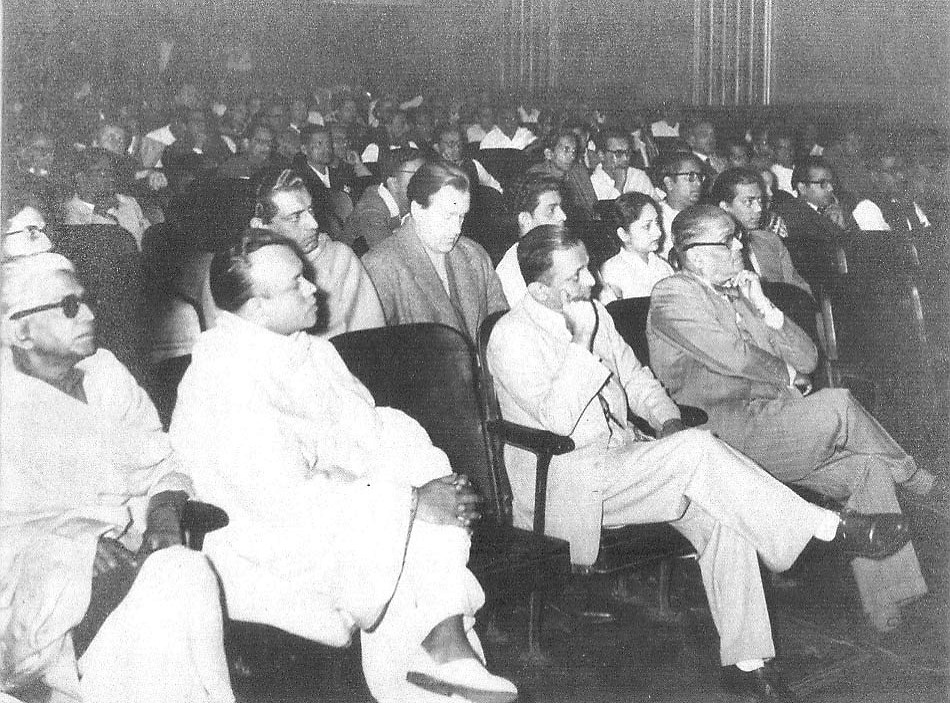
CFS revival at Kolkata 1956.jpg

Today it is seen as an important harbinger of New Wave cinema in India, as it allowed first hand access to world cinema to local viewers and in time started the film society movement in India.

== History ==
Although a film society was formed by documentary filmmakers in Bombay in 1942, this was the first film society dedicated to feature films. Satyajit Ray then a young aspiring film maker provided film books and magazines, while Chidananda Dasgupta offer a room in his home for the meetings. And despite tough censorship policies, under the "Indian Cinematograph Act 1918" of the British Raj, which still in enforced censorship rule to all gathering for cinema viewing, they survived low membership during the first five years viewing mainly Russian and European films. The society also started a bulletin designed by Ray, and several of his article were later published in the book, Our Films, Their Films (1972). Noted film personalities were invited to speak at the society which they did on several occasions, including Russian actor, Nikolay Cherkasov, directors Jean Renoir, John Huston. Ray later recounted his meeting with Renoir as an important turning point in shaping his cinematic vision of his first film, Pather Panchali which he explained to Renoir when he was visiting India to look for locations for his film The River, in which Ray assisted Renoir.

In the following years, when the first International Film Festival of India was organized in 1952, the society was extensively consulted for the films to be invited to the festival. The festival according to film historian, Jerzy Toeplitz became a turning point in the history of Indian cinema as it was first time, Indian audience had access to Italian neorealism as well as new Japanese cinema.
