= Bagha Jatin (1977 film) =

1977 Indian film directed by Harisadhan Dasgupta

- Directed by: Harisadhan Dasgupta
- Written by: Jagannath Guha
- Produced by: Government of India
- Cinematography: Kamal Nayak
- Edited by: Arobindo Bhattacharjee
- Distributed by: Films Division of India
- Release date: 1977
- Country: India
- Language: English

Bagha Jatin is an English historical documentary film directed by Harisadhan Dasgupta based on the life of leading revolutionary Bagha Jatin. This film was released in 1977 under the banner of Films Division of India, Government of India.

== Plot ==
This is a biographical short documentary film based on life events Jatindranath Mukherjee and his pivotal leadership within the secret revolutionary network. The documentary highlights his grand strategic plan of formation of Jugantar group, during World War I to an armed uprising against British colonial rule using Hindu–German Conspiracy.
