= Chidananda Dasgupta =

Indian Bengali filmmaker

Chidananda Das Gupta
- Born: 20 November 1921; Shillong, Assam, British India
- Died: 22 May 2011 (aged 89); Kolkata, West Bengal, India

Chidananda Das Gupta (Bengali: চিদানন্দ দাশগুপ্ত) (20 November 1921 – 22 May 2011)—family name sometimes spelled 'Dashgupta' and 'Dasgupta'—was an Indian filmmaker, film critic, a film historian and one of the founders of Calcutta Film Society with Satyajit Ray in 1947. He lived and worked in Calcutta and Santiniketan.

== Early life ==
Son of Shantilata and Manmathanath Dasgupta, a Brahmo missionary and social worker, he was born at Shillong, India in 1921. In 1944 he married, Supriya Das, a daughter of Brahmananda Dashgupta, uncle of poet Jibanananda Das. His daughter Aparna Sen is a well known actress and filmmaker. Actress Konkona Sen Sharma is his granddaughter.

Das Gupta first entered politics during the anti-British Quit India movement days of the 1940s, then began teaching at St. Columba's College, Hazaribagh, personal assistant to Prasanta Chandra Mahalanobis at the Indian Statistical Institute, Calcutta, teaching at City College, Kolkata, journalism, and then a plush job in advertising with Imperial Tobacco.

== The film society movement ==
In 1947, Das Gupta, along with Satyajit Ray, RP Gupta, Sunil Janah, Bansi Chandragupta, Harisadhan Dasgupta and others, founded the Calcutta Film Society.

In 1959, the Federation of Film Societies of India was set up at the initiative of Das Gupta, Satyajit Ray, Mrs. Vijaya Mulay, Mrs. Ammu Swaminathan, Robert Hawkins, Diptendu Pramanick, Abul Hassan and A. Roychowdhury. The Federation has played a major role in the spread of the film society movement in India.

== Writing and translations ==
Das Gupta is well known for his essays and translations of Rabindranath Tagore, Manik Bandopadhyay and Jibanananda Das. He had a close association with poet Jibanananda Das during the latter's lifetime which gave him unique insights into the poetry of Jibanananda Das that is often alleged to be obscure and unintelligible.

One of the most famous poems of Bengali literature, namely, Banalata Sen by poet Jibanananda Das has been rendered into English by Das Gupta. It reads as follows:

Banalata Sen

For aeons have I roamed the roads of the earth.
From the seas of Ceylon to the straits of Malaya
I have journeyed, alone, in the enduring night,
And down the dark corridor of time I have walked
Through mist of Bimbisara, Asoka, darker Vidarbha.
Round my weary soul the angry waves still roar;
My only peace I knew with Banalata Sen of Natore.

Her hair was dark as night in Vidisha;
Her face the sculpture of Sravasti.
I saw her, as a sailor after the storm
Rudderless in the sea, spies of a sudden
The grass-green heart of the leafy island.
‘Where were you so long?' she asked, and more
With her bird's-nest eyes, Banalata Sen of Natore.

As the footfall of dew comes evening;
The raven wipes the smell of warm sun
From its wings; the world's noises die.
And in the light of fireflies the manuscript
Prepares to weave the fables of night;
Every bird is home, every river reached the ocean.
Darkness remains; and time for Banalata Sen.

== Writing about cinema ==
Chidananda Das Gupta is best known as a film historian and film critic. He has written over 2000 articles on cinema in various periodicals. In 1957, he, Ray and others, started the Indian Film Quarterly. His contributions to the British film magazine Sight and Sound have permanent archival value. He has studied closely the work of his friend Satyajit Ray, and his 1980 book The Cinema of Satyajit Ray remains one of the definitive works on Ray.

== Awards ==
In 2004 Chidananada Das Gupta was honoured at the Osian Film Festival, 2004, with a Lifetime Achievement Award for writing on cinema.

== Filmmaker ==
Das Gupta directed as many as seven films, namely The Stuff of Steel (1969), The Dance of Shiva (1968), Portrait of a City (1961), Amodini (1994), Zaroorat Ki Purti (1979), Rakhto (1973) and Bilet Pherat (1972) Of these he composed only two. These are Bilet Pherat and Amodini, the latter starring both his daughter Aparna Sen and his granddaughter Konkona Sen Sharma.

Amodini was made in 1996. It was a one-hour forty-five-minute family comedy. Casting included Aparna Sen, Rachana Banerjee, Anusree Das, and Pijush Ganguly, among others. A satirical Indian fairy tale, it is set in the perspective of the 18th century, when traditional social customs were strictly enforced and complied with. The storyline is about the exploits of a pretty and spoiled daughter of a rajah (king) who is forced to become the bride of her 15-year-old Brahmin houseboy after the man she was supposed to marry jilts her on her wedding day. If she does not marry before sunset, something horrible will happen to her; therefore, she must marry the servant boy. After the ceremony, the boy is exiled, and the union remains unconsummated. Years pass and tragedy befalls the rajah who has lost all his wealth. Suddenly the servant boy returns but is no longer a servant. Now, he has become wealthy and powerful enough to take the rajah's position from him. Even though he had married another by then, his former bride begged him to take her in.

== Filmography ==
- The Stuff of Steel (1969)
- The Dance of Shiva (1968)
- Portrait of a City (1961)
- Amodini (1994)
- Zaroorat Ki Purti (1979)
- Rakhto (1973)
- Bilet Pherat (1972)

== Later life ==
As an elderly man, Das Gupta was physically impaired from Parkinson's disease. He used wheel chair to move and his voice was barely audible. However he remained active. He always dressed up in trademark cream kurta-pyjama. His white stubble around the cheeks well passed for a French beard. It has been said that Chidananda Das Gupta was a picture of 'restraint' and 'dignity'. He died on 22 May 2011 in Kolkata after catching bronchopneumonia brought on by Parkinson's disease.

== Publications ==
- Seeing is Believing: Selected Writings on Cinema, 2008, Penguin Books, New Delhi.
- Selected Poems – Jibanananda Das, 2006, Penguin Books, New Delhi.
- The Cinema of Satyajit Ray, 2001, National Book Trust.
- The Painted Face: Studies in India's Popular Cinemas, 1991, Roli Books.
- Satyajit Ray: An anthology of statements on Ray and by Ray: edited by Chidananda Das Gupta, 1981, Film India.
- Talking about Films, 1981, Orient Longman.
- Unpopular Cinema, Macmillan India Ltd.
