= Kojagori =

2015 Indian Bengali TV series

- Official Poster
- Genre: Drama; Romantic Comedy
- Created by: Saibal Banerjee
- Written by: Leena Gangopadhyay
- Directed by: Saibal Banerjee
- Starring: Raja Goswami; Aparajita Ghosh Das
- Composer: Debojyoti Mishra
- Country of origin: India
- Original language: Bengali
- No. of episodes: 328

Production
- Producer: Saibal Banerjee
- Production location: Kolkata
- Running time: 22 minutes
- Production company: Magic Moments Motion Pictures

Original release
- Network: Zee Bangla
- Release: 2 February 2015 – 13 February 2016

Kojagori is a Bengali language television soap opera that premiered from 2 February 2015 and aired on Zee Bangla. Produced by Magic Moments Motion Pictures, it starred Raja Goswami and Aparajita Ghosh Das in lead roles.

The show revolves around Shouronil Mitta (Raja Goswami) and Phuljhuri (Aparajita Ghosh Das) who are diametrically different from each other. The success of this show inspired Magic Moments Motion Pictures to produce a show bearing a similar plotline for Zee Bangla's rival channel Star Jalsha, Khorkuto.

== Plot summary ==
While Phuljhuri (Aparajita Ghosh Das) is a city-bred, pampered young girl who lives life on her own terms, Saheb (Raja Goswami Om) is a well-read, upright yet grounded youth, who believes in simple living, with high ideals. But fate brings the two people together in wedlock.

== Cast ==
=== Main cast ===
- Aparajita Ghosh Das as Kojagori Mitra (Mallick) aka Phuljhuri - Main Lead and Titular Protagonist, Saheb's wife.
- Raja Gowsami as Shouronil Mitra aka Saheb - Main Lead and Protagonist, Phuljhuri's husband.

=== Recurring cast ===
- Ashok Bhattacharya as Amiyo Bhushan Chowdhury - Phuljhuri's (adoptive) grandfather.
- Sudeshna Roy as Kana - Phuljhuri's aunt
- Soma Banerjee as Noori - Phuljhuri's biological mother.
- Sandip Dey as Phuljhuri's biological father.
- Santu Mukherjee as Haradhan Mitra - Saheb's grandfather.
- Anusuya Majumdar as Rashmoni Mitra aka Ginni Maa - Saheb's grandmother.
- Goutam De as Saheb's granduncle
- Tanuka Chatterjee as Saheb's grandaunt
- Diganta Bagchi as Saheb's father
- Manjushree Ganguly as Saheb's mother
- Anushree Das as Saheb's eldest aunt
- Anindya Chakraborti as Saheb's second elder paternal uncle
- Rajashree Bhowmik as Saheb's second eldest aunt
- Suman Banerjee as Saheb's eldest brother.
- Samata Das as Saheb's eldest sister-in-law.
- Manoj Ojha as Saheb's second eldest brother.
- Sahana Sen as Saheb's second eldest sister-in-law.
- Sourav Chatterjee as Ganesh Mitra - Saheb's third (elder) brother.
- Saurav Das as Kartick Mitra - Saheb's fourth (elder) brother.
- Debjani Chakraborty as Saheb's fourth (elder) sister-in-law.
- Debolina Mukherjee as Saheb's fifth and last (elder) sister-in-law.
- Bulbuli Panja as Saheb's elder sister, Iqbal's wife.
- Dhrubajyoti Sarkar as Iqbal - Saheb's brother-in-law.
- Priya Paul as Diya- Saheb's protege turned lover, Amiyo Bhushan's actual granddaughter.

=== Special appearances ===
- Soumitra Chatterjee in the episode Kobi Pronam
- Haimanti Sukla in the episode Kobi Pronam.

== Reception ==
The serial is being ranked as one of the most watched television serial from the day it has premiered on television. It now fetches a trp of 8.0. The serial received 4 awards at the Tele Samman Awards (2014).

== See also ==
- Ei Chheleta Bhelbheleta
- Aparajita Ghosh Das
- Magic Moments Motion Pictures
