= Shesher Kabita =

1929 novel by Rabindranath Tagore

- Shesher Kabita book front cover
- Author: Rabindranath Tagore
- Original title: শেষের কবিতা
- Translator: Kripalini (1946)
- Language: Bengali
- Genre: Novel
- Publication date: 1929
- Publication place: India
- English publication date: 1946 (first publication)

Shesher Kabita (Bengali: শেষের কবিতা) is a novel by Rabindranath Tagore. The novel was serialised in 1928, from Bhadra to Choitro in the magazine Probashi, and was published in book form the following year. It has been translated into English as The Last Poem (translator Anandita Mukhopadhyay) and Farewell song (translator Radha Chakravarty).

== Synopsis ==
The novel recounts the love story of Amit Ray living in Kolkata in the 1920s. Though he is a barrister educated at Oxford his main interest lies in literature. Never afraid to speak his mind, he is always ready to challenge society's pre-established knowledge and rules regarding literature, equal rights and so on. While vacationing in Shillong, he comes upon a governess named Labanya in a minor car accident. Amit's iconoclasm meets Labannya's sincere simplicity through a series of dialogues and poems that they write for each other.

The novel also contains a self-reference of significance in Bengali literature. By the late 1920s, more than a decade after his Nobel Prize, Tagore had become a towering presence in Bengal, and was facing criticism:

A younger group of writers were trying to escape from the penumbra of Rabindranath, often by tilting at him and his work. In 1928 he decided to call a meeting of writers at Jorasanko and hear them debate the issues.

Shortly after this meeting, while writing this novel, Tagore has Amit railing against a much revered poet, whose name turns out to be Rabi Thakur - Rabi is a common short form of Rabindranath, and Thakur is the original Bengali for Tagore. Amit remarks: "Poets must live for at most five years. ... Our severest complaint against Rabi Thakur is that like Wordsworth, he is illicitly staying alive." These remarks aroused much mirth among the reading public, but the novel is also a serious attempt at demonstrating his versatility, at age 67.

Even the theme was novel - after building up their affair and obtaining the blessings of Labannya's employer Jogmayadevi (Labannya served as her daughter's governess but they shared a very close relationship and she was considered Labannya's real guardian), the lovers decide to marry other suitors, without the air of tragedy. In the text, the reason appears to be that they feel that daily chores of living together will kill the purity of their romance:

Most barbarians equate marriage with the union, and look upon the real union thereafter with contempt.... ketakI and I - our love is like water in my kalsi (jug); I fill it each morning, and use it all day long. But Labannya's love is like a vast lake, not to be brought home, but into which my mind can immerse itself.

However, this surface text is subject to many interpretations. Rabindranath biographer Krishna Kripalini, writes in the foreword of his translation of Shesher Kabita (Farewell my Friend, London 1946):

[Labannya] releases [Amit Ray] own submerged depth of sincerity, which he finds hard to adjust to... The struggle makes him a curiously pathetic figure... The tragedy is understood by the girl who releases him from his troth and disappears from his life.

The poem "Nirjharini" from the book was later published as a separate poem in the collection of poems known as Mohua.

== Adaptations ==
- Shesher Kabita (1953 film) directed by Madhu Bose and starring Nirmal Kumar as Amit Roy and Dipti Roy as Labanya.
- The 1981 Soviet-Russian film Could One Imagine? (Russian: Вам и не снилось…, romanized: Vam i ne snilos), also released as Love and Lies, contains a song called "Последняя поэма" (The last poem) that is partially based on a letter from Labannya. The author of the poem is Adelina Adalis.
- A film Shesher Kobita (2014 film), adaptation of the book, was released in 2013. It was directed by Suman Mukhopadhyay and starred Konkona Sen Sharma as Labannya and Rahul Bose as Amit Ray.
- A full radio play of Shesher Kabita is available on YouTube. It was performed at the lawn of Sir. P.C. Mitter's heritage house on Elgin Road on 1 April 2012.
- Poem Of An Ending, a stage adaptation of Tagore's Shesher Kabita, was staged by Theatreworms Productions, New Delhi (Directed by Kaushik Bose & Durba Ghose) at Panna Bharat Ram Theatre Festival, on 27 December 2018.
- Shesher Golpo an extension of the novel was released in July 2019. The film directed by Jiit Chakraborty, had Soumitra Chatterjee as 'Amit Ray' and Mamata Shankar as 'Labanya'.
