= Datta (2023 film) =

- Poster
- Directed by: Nirmal Chakravarty
- Starring: Rituparna Sengupta; Saheb Chatterjee; Joy Sengupta
- Cinematography: Mrinmoy Mondal
- Edited by: Malay Laha
- Music by: Joy Sarkar
- Release date: 16 June 2023
- Country: India
- Language: Bengali

Datta is a 2023 Indian Bengali language film based on the novel with the same name written by Sarat Chandra Chattopadhyay. directed by Nirmal Chakraborty. It stars Rituparna Sengupta, Saheb Chatterjee, Joy Sengupta, Biswajit Chakraborty, and Devlina Kumar. The music was composed by Joy Sarkar. It was theatrically released on 16 June 2023.

== Synopsis ==
It is a Bengali film based on Sarat Chandra Chattopadhyay's classic novel Datta.

== Cast ==
- Rituparna Sengupta as Bijoya
- Joy Sengupta as Naren
- Saheb Chatterjee as Bilas
- Biswajit Chakraborty as Rasbihari
- Devlina Kumar as Nalini

== Production ==
Nirmal Chakraborty announced her directorial debut film titled "Datta" based on the novel with the same name written by Sarat Chandra Chattopadhyay. Rituparna Sengupta and Joy Sengupta playing the lead role. On 12 February 2020, principal photography took place in Kolkata and filming was completed on 24 May 2023, with official confirmation from film actress Rituparna Sengupta.

== Soundtrack ==
Datta

Soundtrack album by Joy Sarkar
- Released: 2023
- Recorded: 2023
- Genre: Feature film soundtrack
- Length: 13:33
- Language: Bengali

Official audio
- Datta- Full Album on YouTube

The soundtrack of the album was released on 12 June 2023. Datta consists of four songs composed by Joy Sarkar, lyricist three song Rabindra Sangeets and one song of Rajanikanta Sen. first song titled "Jadi Tare Nai Chini Go" released on 12 June 2023.

No.	Title	Artist(s)	Length
1.	"Dhaye Jeno Mor"	Srovonti Bandyopadhyay	3:23
2.	"Tumi Nirmalo Koro"	Riddhi Bandyopadhyay	3:12
3.	"Kotobaro Bhabechhinu"	Aditi Gupta	3:51
4.	"Jodi Taare Nai Chini"	Babul Supriyo	3:47
Total length:			13:33

== Reception ==
Devarti Ghosh from Ei Samay Sangbadpatra wrote "Those who like to watch literary films, they can come and see 'Datta' in colorful frames to find entertainment, it will not hurt". Suparna Majumder from Sangbad Pratidin says "The use of Rabindra songs is more dramatic than the previous films and also beautiful as a prelude. Director Nirmal Chakraborty stumbles a bit in his first steps. Hopefully, he'll be a little more aware next time".
