= Amodini =

- Poster
- Directed by: Chidananda Dasgupta
- Written by: Chidananda Dasgupta
- Produced by: NFDC; Doordarshan
- Starring: Pijush Ganguly; Rachna Banerjee; Anushree Das
- Cinematography: Madhu Ambat
- Edited by: Ujjal Nandi
- Music by: C. R. Chowdhury; Hrishikesh-Saurabh-Jasraj
- Release date: 1994
- Country: India
- Language: Bengali

Amodini is a 1994 Indian Bengali-language romantic drama film directed by Chidananda Dasgupta. It stars Pijush Ganguly, Rachna Banerjee and Anushree Das. The film was screened at the Indian Panorama section of the International Film Festival of India on 11 January 1996.

Supriya Dasgupta won the National Film Award for Best Costume Design for her work in this film.

== Cast ==
- Pijush Ganguly as Pandu
- Rachana Banerjee as Amodini
- Anushree Das
- Konkona Sen Sharma as Teenage stepmother
- Ashoke Mukherjee
- Tathagata Sanyal
- Debika Mitra
- Aparna Sen

== Reception ==
S. R. Ashok Kumar of The Hindu wrote that "Directed by Chidananda Dasgupta, this film has Pijush Ganguly, Rachana Banerjee, Ashoke Mukherjee, Tathagata Sanyal, Anusree Das have done their best with the help of the director. The camera by Madhu Ambat and technicians of the other departments of filmmaking have also co-operated to the maximum to make it an enjoyable film.". Deborah Young of Variety wrote that "It’s all good fun for those who like period costumes and historical pageantry and aren’t bothered by the broad comedy of thesps who seem to be acting out a cartoon".
