= 72 Ghanta =

2021 Bengali film by Atanu Ghosh

- Theatrical release poster
- Directed by: Atanu Ghosh
- Written by: Atanu Ghosh
- Produced by: Atanu Ghosh
- Cinematography: Soumik Haldar
- Edited by: Sujay Datta Ray
- Music by: Debojyoti Mishra
- Production company: Storyline Movies
- Distributed by: Chorki
- Release date: 25 November 2021 (Worldwide)
- Running time: 109 minutes

72 Ghanta (transl. 72 Hours) is a 2021 Indian Bengali-language mystery comedy-drama film directed and produced by Atanu Ghosh. The film was released in Chorki, a Bangladeshi OTT platform. This is the last film of veteran Bengali actor Soumitra Chatterjee which will be released posthumously.

== Plot ==
An old man, former stand-up comedian commits suicide and thereafter six different stories unfold one by one. The 12 protagonists of the stories appear unrelated but the latter reveals that they are highly interlinked.

== Cast ==
- Soumitra Chatterjee
- Paran Bandopadhyay as Sharat
- Abir Chatterjee as Anamro
- Ritwick Chakraborty
- Kharaj Mukherjee as Pulin
- Sudipta Chakraborty as Pritha
- Ananya Chatterjee
- Indrani Haldar as Anjana
- Riya Banik as Kousani
- Ranodeep Bose
- Sudipta Banerjee
