= Bonku Babu =

- Directed by: Anindya Bikas Datta
- Written by: Anindya Bikas Datta
- Produced by: Deepak Chandak, Sonika Singh Bhatti
- Starring: Saswata Chatterjee; Arjun Chakraborty; Arunima Ghosh; Laboni Sarkar; Rajatava Dutta
- Cinematography: Chandan Goswami
- Edited by: Sanjib Dutta
- Music by: Debojyoti Mishra
- Release date: 4 July 2014
- Running time: 149 minutes
- Country: India
- Language: Bengali

Bonku Babu (2014) is Bengali comedy movie directed by Anindya Bikas Datta, starring Saswata Chatterjee as Bonku Babu, a 70-year-old man. The film also stars Arjun Chakraborty and Arunima Ghosh.
