= Joy Sarkar =

Indian singer

- Also known as: Joy Da
- Born: Sourav Sarkar; 11 January 1972 (age 54); Kolkata, West Bengal, India
- Origin: Kolkata, West Bengal, India
- Genres: Bengali Modern, Filmi, Bangla Ghazals, Classical
- Occupation: Music Composer
- Instrument: Guitar
- Years active: 1998–present
- Spouse: Lopamudra Mitra (m. 2001)

Sourav Sarkar, popularly known as Joy Sarkar, is a Kolkata based Indian Bengali film music composer. Sarkar mainly works in Bengali cinema and albums. He composed soundtracks for Jodi Ekdin (2010), Accident (2012), Muktodhara (2012), Bicycle Kick (2013), Half Serious (2013), Rupkatha Noy (2013), The play (2013), Antaraal (2013), Women Prayed and Preyed Upon (2013), Ek Phali Rodh (2014), Abby Sen (2015), Kiriti Roy (2016), Nayikar Bhumikay (2017), Bilu Rakkhosh (2017), Pupa (2018), Reunion (2019), Shesher Golpo (2019), and Parcel (2019).

== Personal life ==
Joy Sarkar was born on 1972, 11 January in Kolkata, India, to Sudhin Sarkar, who is a Bengali singer of yesteryears, and Kalyani Sarkar. He has an elder brother, Rana, who is also a musician. Due to the musical bent of his parents, music came to him spontaneously.

Sarkar is married to a Bengali singer Lopamudra Mitra since 2001.

== Discography ==
=== Albums ===
Year	Album	Singer(s)	Notes
2019	Aashiana Baarishana	Nilashree	Lyrics by Srijato

=== Filmography ===
Joy Sarkar worked as music director for the following films.

Year	Film name	Director(s)	Notes
2010	Jodi Ekdin	Riingo Banerjee	
2012	Accident	Shiboprosad Mukherjee, Nandita Roy	
2012	Muktodhara	Shiboprosad Mukherjee, Nandita Roy	
2013	Bicycle Kick	Sumit Das, Debasish Sen Sharma	
2013	Half Serious	Utsav Mukherjee	
2013	Rupkatha Noy	Atanu Ghosh	
2013	The play	Ranjay Ray Choudhury	
2013	Antaraal	Binay Kumar Mittra, Benoy Mittra	
2013	Women Prayed and Preyed Upon (Documentary)	Kankana Chakraborty	
2014	Ek Phaali Rodh	Atanu Ghosh	
2015	Abby Sen	Atanu Ghosh	
2016	Kiriti Roy	Aniket Chattopadhyay	
2017	Nayikar Bhumikay	Swagato Chowdhury	
2017	Bilu Rakkhosh	Indrasis Acharya	
2018	Pupa	Indrasis Acharya	
2018	Reunion	Murari Mohan Rakshit	
2019	Shesher Golpo	Jiit Chakraborty	
2019	Parcel	Indrasis Acharya	
2020	Doodhpither Gachh	Ujjwal Basu	
2022	Boudi Canteen	Parambrata Chatterjee	
2022	Manabjomin	Srijato	
2023	Datta		

Worked as music director for the following Webseries.

Year	Series Name	Director/Directors	Notes
2020	Tansener Tanpura	Soumik Chattopadhyay	Hoichoi
2020	Feluda Pherot	Srijit Mukherjee	Addatimes
2021	Robindronath Ekhane Kawkhono Khete Aashenni	Srijit Mukherjee	Hoichoi
2022	Rudrabinar Obhishaap	Joydeep Mukherjee	Hoichoi
2022	Feludar Goyendagiri	Srijit Mukherjee	Hoichoi

=== Singles ===
- "Aaye Aaaye Ke Jaabi" with Lopamudra Mitra (2002)
- "Dekhechho Ki Taake(Brishti Paaye Paaye)" with Subhamita Banerjee (2005)
- "Mon Kemoner Station" (album) with Shreya Ghoshal (2012)
- "Kolkata Diaries" (Hindi) with Akriti Kakar (2016)
- "Khobor Diyo Hothat Kanna Pele" with Joy Sarkar (2016)
- "Dekha Jodi Ba Hoy Abar" with Shom Chatterjee (2016)
- "Ei Roko" with Joy Sarkar (2017)
- "Taar Daak Naam" with Srija (2017)
- Rabindra Sangeet albums ( Music Arrangement)
- "Bhalobasa Kare koy" with Srabani Sen (2003)
- "Bismaye" with Lopamudra Mitra (2003)
- "Krishnakali" with Lopamudra Mitra (2004)
- "Mone Rekho" with Lopamudra Mitra (2006)
- "Ananda The Ecstasy" with Lopamudra Mitra (2009)
- "Silent Amazement" with Rituparna Sengupta, Lopamudra Mitra, Sujoy Prasad Chatterjee (2012)
- "Akash-The Infinite" with Lopamudra Mitra (2017)
- "Ajana Gaaner Ajana" with Subhamita Banerjee 2019
- "Hoytoh Prem" with Shaan and Akriti Kakkar 2018
