= Iti Srikanta =

- DVD cover
- Directed by: Anjan Das
- Screenplay by: Rajarshi Roy; Shantasree Sarkar
- Based on: Srikanta (1917) by Sarat Chandra Chattopadhyay
- Produced by: Shantasree Sarkar
- Starring: Adil Hussain; Soha Ali Khan; Reema Sen
- Cinematography: Shirsha Roy
- Edited by: Sanjib Datta
- Music by: Bikram Ghosh
- Release date: 4 June 2004
- Country: India
- Language: Bengali

Iti Srikanta (transl. Your Truly, Srikanta) is a 2004 Bengali period drama film directed by Anjan Das. This film is based on novelist Sarat Chandra Chattopadhyay's novel, Srikanta (1917) In an interview in 2005, Das, director of the film, told about his depiction of the character Srikanta– "Several films have been made on Srikanta but all these had mainly dealt with specific chapters from Srikanta, the novel. I wanted to present the complete man — his inner conflict and turmoil over the two women in his life, torn between a baiji and a vaishnavi". He also felt, the crisis felt by Srikanta as shown in Sarat Chandra Chattopadhyay's novel are still relevant.

This was Soha Ali Khan's debut film, and also of actors, Aparajita Ghosh Das and Bengali film debut of lead actors, Adil Hussain as well as Reema Sen, whose voice was dubbed in the film by Sujan Mukhopadhyay. The film was part of the Indian panorama section at the IFFI in 2004. At the 52nd National Film Awards, Anup Mukhopadhyay was awarded the National Film Award for Best Audiography. also at the 2004 Anandalok Awards, Anjan Das won the award for Best Director.

== Plot ==
The film is a love triangle between a young man Srikanta (Adil Hussain) and two women in his life, Rajalakshmi (Reema Sen) a rich courtesan and Kamalata (Soha Ali Khan), a vaishnavite living in an ashram.

== Cast ==
- Adil Hussain as Srikanta
- Soha Ali Khan as Kamallata
- Reema Sen as Rajlakshmi
- Pijush Ganguly as Gahar
- Aparajita Ghosh Das as Padma
- Debajit Mondal
