= Our Films, Their Films =

Anthology by Satyajit Ray

- Author: Satyajit Ray
- Publication date: 1976
- Publication place: India

Our Films, Their Films is an anthology of film criticism by noted Bengali filmmaker, composer and writer Satyajit Ray. Collecting articles and personal journal excerpts, it was first published in India in 1976; an English translation was published in The United States and United Kingdom in 1992. Some of articles were previously published in the bulletin of the Calcutta Film Society which Ray co-founded in 1947.

As the title suggests, the book is presented in two sections: Ray discusses Indian film in the first section, and covers international topics such as Hollywood, Charlie Chaplin, Akira Kurosawa, and movements like Italian neorealism in the second section.
