= Jamaibabu =

1996 Bengali film

- Directed by: Dulal Bhowmik
- Starring: Tapas Paul; Shatabdi Roy; Indrani Halder; Subhendu Chatterjee
- Music by: Bappi Lahiri
- Production company: Filmalaya Private Limited
- Release date: 1996
- Running time: 124 minutes
- Country: India
- Language: Bengali

Jamaibabu (The Brother-in-Law) is a Bengali language romance drama film directed by Dulal Bhowmik and with music composed by Bappi Lahiri. This film was released in 1996 under the banner of Filmalaya Private Limited.

== Plot ==
Rama, the daughter of Mr. Chunilal, is studying in a college in Kolkata. She is a girl who does not care about anything. In a college function she quarrels with a boy named Dulal. Rama fabricates a plan to expel Dulal from college, but Dulal saves her from another student called Mantu from getting raped. Rama thought about her fault and fell in love with Dulal. After getting intimate, Rama got pregnant and informed another college mate as well as their best friend Jayanta, the son of business tycoon Biren Mukherjee. Jayanta asked Dulal to marry Rama. He also arranged a safe place for the new couple in his house. On the other hand, Rama's father Chunilal fixed the marriage of Rama with the same Jayanta. When Chunilal came to know that Rama had already been married off to another person, he became angry and went to Kolkata from Asansol with his younger daughter Rina. Suddenly they saw Jayanta's picture and guessed Jayanta as Rama's husband as they fixed earlier. To control the damage Dulal posed to be a servant and Jayanta became Rina's loving 'Jamaibabu'. But one day Rina knew the whole plot. Meanwhile, Mantu come to know everything about the concocted fact of Rama and Dulal. He started to blackmail Rama for money and kidnapped Dulal and Rina. Jayanta goes to save Dulal and his would-be wife Rina.

== Cast ==
- Subhendu Chatterjee as Chunilal
- Tapas Paul as Dulal
- Abhishek Chatterjee as Jayanta
- Satabdi Roy as Rama
- Indrani Haldar as Rina
- Chinmoy Roy as Chunilal's brother in law
- Arun Bannerjee as Biren Mukherjee
- Rahul Barman as Mantu

== Songs ==
This film received Bengal Film Journalists' Association Awards in the year of 1997 for Best Music.

- "Amra Premi Premer Dol"
- "Tumi Kajol Ami Tomar Nayan"
- "Chhi Chhi Eki Kando Korecho"
