= Harisadhan Dasgupta =

Indian Film Director

- Born: 14 April 1924; Calcutta, Bengal Presidency, British India
- Died: 19 August 1996 (aged 72); Shantiniketan, West Bengal, India
- Education: University of Southern California
- Occupations: Filmmaker, Director, Writer
- Notable work: Konarak: The Sun Temple, A Perfect Day, Panchthupi: A Village in West Bengal, Tata: The Story of Steel
- Spouse: Sonali Senroy Dasgupta
- Children: Raja Dasgupta
- Relatives: Sohag Sen, Birsa Dasgupta, Ribhu Dasgupta, Bidipta Chakraborty

Harisadhan Dasgupta (1924–1996) was an Indian film director from Calcutta who was most prolific in the 1950s and 1960s. Dasgupta specialized in surveying subjects of fascination to the Bengali public.

Dasgupta attended the University of Southern California and later the University of California, Los Angeles to study film-making. He studied for a time under Hollywood producer Irving Pichel. Upon completing an apprenticeship, he returned to Calcutta to produce documentaries.

Over a lengthy career, Dasgupta produced many documentaries, long and short. He was best known for his English language documentaries on the Bengali people's situation, including such works as Panchthupi: A Village in West Bengal (1955), Panorama of West Bengal (1961), Glimpses of India (1965), and The Automobile Industry in India (1969). He became most well known for his classic documentary commissioned by Tata Steel, India's largest private corporation, titled Tata: The Story of Steel. As with several of his films, this documentary was scripted by Satyajit Ray. Throughout his career, Dasgupta also worked with several other leading lights involved in Calcutta's film-making renaissance, including Hrishikesh Mukherjee, Claude Renoir, Jean Renoir, Ravi Shankar, Chidananda Dasgupta, and Asit Sen. In 1947, Dasgupta co-founded the Calcutta Film Society along with Satyajit Ray, Chidananda Dasgupta, Sunil Janah, RP Gupta, Bansi Chandragupta and others.

Dasgupta was involved in a highly publicized incident when his wife Sonali left their marriage and their six-year-old son for Italian film director Roberto Rossellini. Their son Raja later expressed relief when she passed due to their estrangement.

== Filmography ==
- Konarak: The Sun Temple (1949)
- Shaher Ki Jhalak (1953)
- Gaon Ki Kahani (1953)
- Weavers of Maindargi (1953)
- Panchthupi: A Village in West Bengal (1955)
- Trancuber: the Song of Waves (1956)
- Tata: The Story of Steel (1958)
- Our Children Will Know Better (1960)
- Acharya Prafulla Chandra Ray (1961)
- Panorama of West Bengal (1962)
- Bade Ghulam Ali Khan Saheb (1964)
- Glimpses of India (1965)
- Quest for Health (1965)
- Malabar Story (1965)
- The Automobile Industry in India (1969)
- The Automobile Industry in India (1969)
- Terracota Temples (1970)
- Port of Calcutta (1971)
- The Tale of Two Leaves and a Bud (1972)
- Bagha Jatin (1977 film)
- This Land is Mine (1980)
- From Mizoram with Love (1981)
- Acharya Nandalal (1984)

== Awards ==
His Panchthupi: A Village in West Bengal was awarded the Best Film of the IDPA Film Festival, Bombay/Delhi, 1959. Hattogol Vijay, a 1961 film made through HS Dasgupta Productions for India Tube Company, was awarded the Prime Minister's Gold Medal as Best Children's Film for 1960.
