= Shesher Golpo =

- Film poster
- Directed by: Jiit Chakraborty
- Written by: Other Byapari
- Based on: Shesher Kabita by Rabindranath Tagore
- Produced by: Joydev Samadder
- Starring: Soumitra Chatterjee; Mamata Shankar; Kharaj Mukherjee; Durga Santra; Pallabi Chatterjee; Arna Mukhopadhyay; Krishnokishor Mukherjee
- Cinematography: Souvik Basu
- Edited by: Sanjib Datta
- Music by: Joy Sarkar
- Production companies: Swastika Film Production; BioCine Productions
- Release date: 19 July 2019
- Running time: 122 minutes
- Country: India
- Language: Bengali

Shesher Golpo is a 2019 Indian Bengali romantic drama film directed by Jiit Chakraborty. The film stars Soumitra Chatterjee as 'Amit Ray' and Mamata Shankar as 'Labanya', in the lead roles. The music of Shesher Golpo was composed by Joy Sarkar. The film is an extension of Shesher Kabita, the famous 1929 novel by Rabindranath Tagore.

== Plot ==
The film is an imaginary dialogue between elderly Amit Ray and Labanya of the novel Shesher Kabita by Rabindranath Tagore. Many years after the separation, 'Amit Ray' (Soumitra Chatterjee) now runs an old age home near Kolkata with his friend Narendra. One fine morning Labanya Dutta (Mamata Shankar), a retired professor of the Oxford University reached there and the long lost chapter of love reviewed with a parallel storyline of a young couple, Akash & Kuhu.

== Cast ==
- Soumitra Chatterjee as Amit Ray
- Mamata Shankar as Labanya
- Kharaj Mukherjee as Nabakrishna
- Durga Santra as Kuhu
- Arna Mukhopadhatay as Akash
- Krishna Kishor Mukhopadhay as Narendra
- Pallavi Chatterjee as Amit's sister Shomita (“CiCi”)
- Kalyan Chatterjee as Indra Chandra
- Pradip Chakraborty as Mr. Sen
- Pradip Bhattacharya as Batuk
- Reshi Bhattacharya as Jogomaya
- Pradip Chakraborty as Mr. Sen

== Release ==
It was theatrically released on 19 July 2019.

== Soundtrack ==
Shesher Golpo

Soundtrack album by Joy Sarkar
- Released: 12 July 2019
- Recorded: 2019
- Studio: Studio Vibrations
- Genre: Feature film soundtrack
- Length: 17:07
- Label: Times Music Bangla

Joy Sarkar chronology
| Reunion (2018) | Shesher Golpo (2019) | Parcel (2019) |

The soundtrack is composed by Joy Sarkar on lyrics by Rajib Chakraborty

All lyrics are written by Rajib Chakraborty; all music is composed by Joy Sarkar.

Track list
| No. | Title | Singer | Length |
|---|---|---|---|
| 1. | "Kopale Aaj Valobasar Jor" | Nachiketa Chakraborty, Kaushiki Chakraborty | 4:33 |
| 2. | "Pure Gechhe Chokh" | Anupam Roy | 4:28 |
| 3. | "Mukh Tule Takiyo Na Aar" | Somlata | 4:27 |
| 4. | "Sesher Golpo Suru" | Rupankar Bagchi | 3:39 |
| Total length: | | | 17:07 |

== Reception ==
Debolina Sen of The Times of India rated the film 3/5 and wrote, "The love story between the youngsters hardly takes off and there is no doubt that Akash and Kuhu are overshadowed by Amit and Labanya. The director and scriptwriter could have either fleshed out the characters better or left the story at Amit and Labanya meeting again".
