= Faltu =

- Directed by: Anjan Das
- Written by: Syed Mustafa Siraj
- Produced by: Arindam Chaudhuri
- Starring: Yash Pandit; Manjari Fadnis
- Cinematography: Sirsha Ray
- Edited by: Sanjeeb Dutta
- Music by: Jyotishka Dasgupta
- Distributed by: Planman Motion Pictures
- Release date: 10 February 2006
- Country: India
- Language: Bengali

Faltu (transl. Useless) is a 2006 Bengali film based on Syed Mustafa Siraj's story Ranir Ghater Brittanto. It won the 2007 National Award. Produced by Arindam Chaudhuri (Planman Motion Pictures) and directed by Anjan Das, the movie featured Soumitra Chatterjee, Indrani Halder, Yash Pandit, Pradip Mukherjee and Manjari Fadnis, Nirmal Kumar, Masood Akhtar, and Biplab Chatterjee. It had been selected from India for the Spain film festival in the competitive category.

== Plot ==
The story is set around Ranirghat in Murshidabad District, West Bengal, in the early 1950s. It follows Faltu, a 20-year-old orphan whose name means “worthless” or “junk” in Bengali, as he searches for the man who fathered him. It also portrays the village and its refugees from then-East Pakistan, whose lives are shaped by the events surrounding him.

The villagers know that Faltu is the son of Sureswari Dasi, known as Suri Khepi, a mentally ill woman played by Indrani Haldar, but nobody knows who his father is. Faltu himself has never been concerned, being content to drive a bus and ferry villagers while pursuing his love for Tuktuki (Manjari Fadnis). His attitude changes when a census official questions his parentage, opening a Pandora's box.

It emerges that several apparently respectable men, including Ismail (Biplab Chatterjee), who raised Faltu and taught him to drive, had raped Suri Khepi, exploiting her mental condition. Everyone knows that Faltu's father is one of them, but nobody knows which man. The men are consumed by guilt and seek to atone for their actions.

The situation becomes more urgent when the government orders the construction of a bridge across the river as part of its “development” plans, requiring the villagers to vacate Ranirghat. Before leaving, they decide that Faltu and Tuktuki should marry as a form of atonement for what they did to Suri Khepi. The village elders organise a meeting, but Tuktuki's father rejects the proposal. He privately tells Faltu that he too raped Suri Khepi, meaning that Faltu and Tuktuki are actually step-siblings and cannot marry.

Tuktuki overhears the confession and commits suicide. The following morning, she is found hanging from a tree. The villagers leave Ranirghat with heavy hearts, while Faltu, undefeated despite his pain and the questions surrounding his birth, continues to drive.

As the bridge construction proceeds, an engineer at the site senses someone nearby and shines his torch towards the figure. The film freezes on the image of another mentally ill woman attempting to drink from streams of water running down the structure, suggesting that another cycle of exploitation and guilt may be beginning.

The story explores human relationships and the burden of guilt. The villagers' attempt to atone for their past wrongdoing instead exposes further secrets and ultimately destroys a marriage.

== Cast ==
- Yash Pandit as Faltu
- Manjari Fadnis as Tuktuki
- Soumitra Chatterjee as Potter
- Indrani Haldar as Suri Khepi
- Nirmal Kumar as Priest
- Sumanta Mukherjee
- Debesh Roy Chowdhury
- Masood Akhtar
- Pradip Mukherjee

== Crew ==
- Producer(s): Arindam Chaudhuri Planman Motion Pictures
- Director:
- Story:Syed Mustafa Siraj
- Production Design:
- Dialogue:
- Lyrics:
- Editing: Sanjeeb Dutta
- Cinematography: Shirsha Roy
- Art: Samir Chanda
- Sound: Anup Mukherjee

== Critical reception ==
- A rich audio-visual experience — The Telegraph of Kolkata (8 stars out of 10)
- Anjan Das has meticulously crafted each scene in the film... You just can't stop praising it! — Bartaman
- Srabanti Chakrabarti of Rediff argued that the story was good but the performances of the main actors weakened the film.
- A moving saga with cutting edge depiction — The Hindu
- The film scores on the storyline and direction — The Pioneer

== Awards ==
- BFJA Awards (2007)
- Best Actress in a Supporting Role: Indrani Haldar
- Best Director: Anjan Das
- Best Screenplay: Anjan Das
- 54th National Film Awards-Best Film on Family Welfare Best

== See also ==
- Jara Bristite Bhijechhilo
