= Arunima Ghosh =

Indian actress

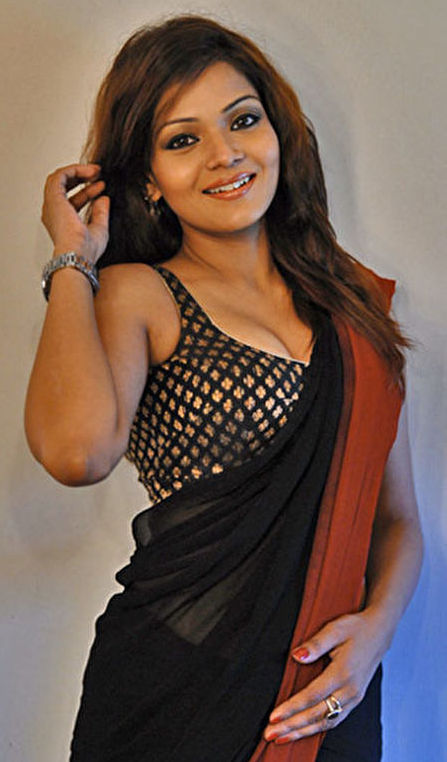
- Occupation: Actress

Arunima Ghosh is an Indian Bengali film and television actress.

== Filmography ==
Year	Film	Note	Reference
2000	Rinmukti		
2004	Surya		
2005	Ek Mutho Chabi		
2005	Sangram		
2007	Probhu Nosto Hoye Jai		
2008	Hochheta Ki		
2011	Apon Shatru		
2011	Love Birds		
2011	Mone Mone Bhalobasa		
2012	Chaal – The Games Begins		
2012	Elar Char Adhyay		
2012	Ami Achhi Sei Je Tomar	Unreleased	
2012	Bhroon	Unreleased	
2012	Blackmail		
2013	Nayika Sangbad		
2014	Bharate		
2014	Banku Babu		
2014	Aamar Aami		
2014	Ek Phaali Rodh		
2015	Abby Sen		
2015	Bonku Babu		
2016	Kiriti O Kalo Bhromor		
2016	Thammar Boyfriend		
2016	Eagoler Chokh		
2017	Aschhe Abar Shabor		
2017	Rong Beronger Khori		
2018	Nilacholey Kiriti		
2018	Aranyadeb		
2019	Sotoroi September		
2021	Shororipu 2: Jotugriho		
2022	Maayakumari		
2022	Iskaboner Bibi		
2022	Lady Chatterjee		
2022	Kirton		
2026	Kirtoner por kirton		

== Television ==
Years	Title	Role	Channel	Notes	Ref.
2009–2013	Sholo Aana		ETV Bangla		
2008–2009	Khela	Indira / Indu	Zee Bangla	Later replaced by Parno Mitra	
2007–2008	Sanai	Radha	Akash Aath		
2009	Sudhu Tomari Jonno		ETV Bangla		
