= Jara Bristite Bhijechhilo =

2007 film by Anjan Das

Jara Brishtite Bhijechhilo
- DVD cover art
- Directed by: Anjan Das
- Produced by: Brand Value Communications
- Starring: Indrani Halder; Anjana Basu Sudip Mukherjee
- Cinematography: Sirsha Ray
- Distributed by: Rose Valley Films
- Release date: 8 June 2007
- Running time: 118 minutes
- Country: India
- Language: Bengali

Jara Brishtite Bhijechhilo (Bengali: যারা বৃষ্টিতে ভিজেছিল, lit. 'Those who were drenched in rain') is a Bengali film based on Joy Goswami's story Jara Brishtite Bhijechhilo, released in 2007. The film was directed by Anjan Das and stars Indrani Halder, Anjana Basu, Sudip Mukherjee, Alokananda Roy and Joy Sengupta.

Indrani Haldar was awarded the best actress award at the Madrid International Film Festival (Spain) for her role. She plays a woman who walks out of marriage after being subjected to repeated marital rape and starts living her life on her own terms with her poet/lover.

== Cast ==
- Indrani Haldar as Radha
- Anjana Basu as Laboni Sen
- Joy Sengupta as Arani Sen
- Sudip Mukherjee as Ashim Sen
- Roopa Ganguly as Suchetana Basu
- Churni Ganguly as Reena Banerjee
- Alokananda Roy
- Biplab Chatterjee
- Soumitra Chatterjee

== See also ==
- Faltu
