= Shesher Kobita (2014 film) =

2014 Bengali film

Shesher Kobita (The Last Poem) is a Bengali romantic drama film directed by Suman Mukhopadhyay adapted from Rabindranath Tagore's landmark 1929 novel of the same name. This film was produced by the Ministry of Culture, Government of India and released in 2014, premiered at the Dubai International Film Festival in 2013.

== Plot ==
Amit Ray, an Oxford educated and highly intellectual barrister, rebels against traditional norms. He travels to Shillong from Kolkata and meets Labanya. Amit is deeply impressed by her personality and simplicity. But at this juncture, Amit's former girlfriend Ketaki, arrives in Shillong with her family.

== Cast ==
- Rahul Bose as Amit Ray
- Konkona Sen Sharma as Labanya
- Swastika Mukherjee as Ketaki
- Debdut Ghosh as Shovonlal
- Tulika Basu as Jogomaya
- Sankalita Roy as Shomita
- Soumitra Chatterjee (in voice artist)
- Aparna Sen (in voice artist)
