= Lopamudra Mitra =

Lopamudra Mitro
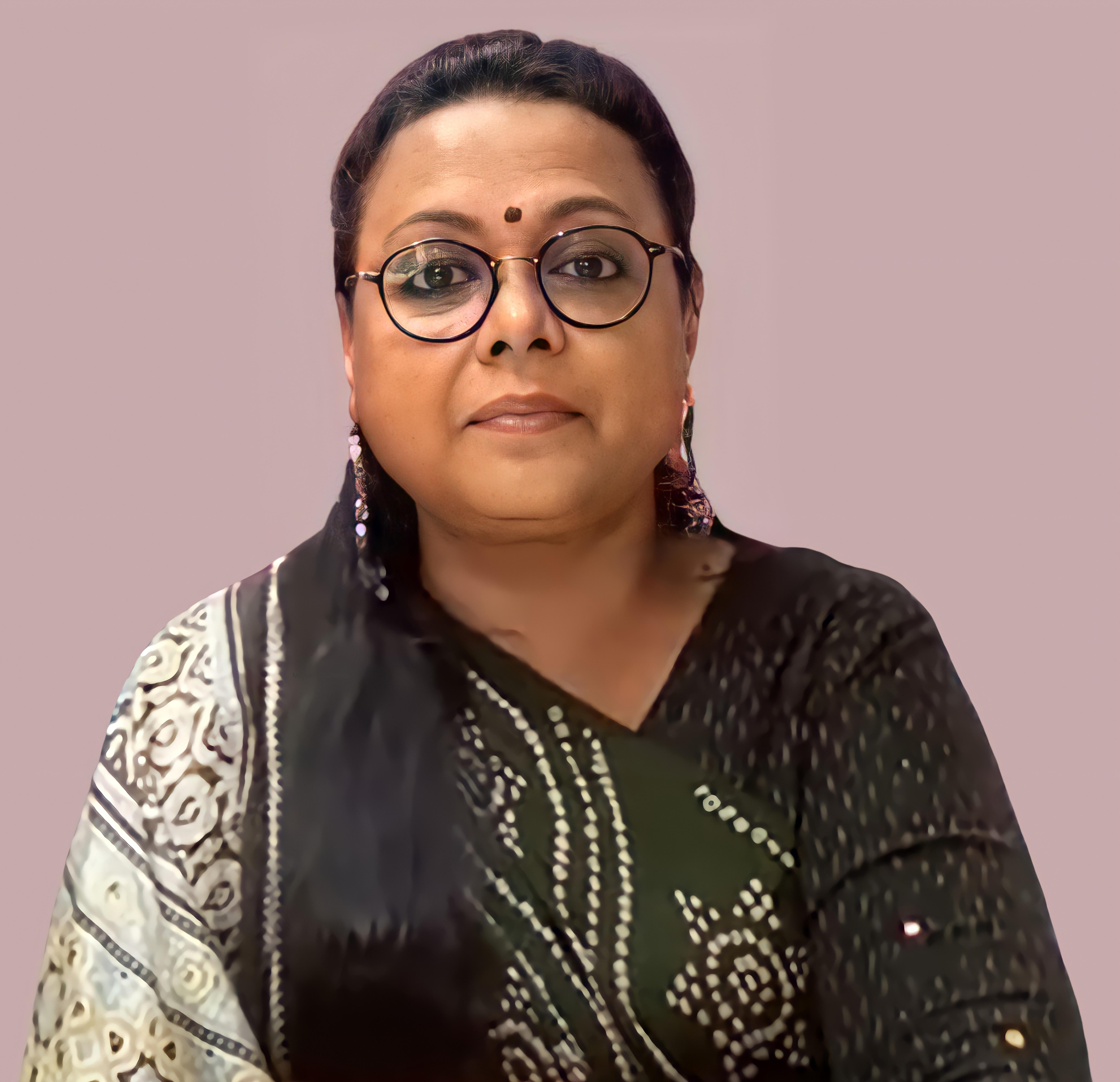
- Mitra in November 2020

Background information
- Origin: Kolkata, West Bengal, India
- Genres: Jeebonmukhi, Aadhunik Bangla Gaan, Rabindra Sangeet,
- Occupation: Singer
- Years active: 1996–present
- Website: www.lopamudramitra.com
- Spouse: Joy Sarkar (m. 2001)

Lopamudra Mitra is an Indian Bengali-language singer and an entrepreneur who started the trend of singing " Kobitar Gaan" or music set to poems. She is a doyen in this genre. Her most notable Kobitar Gaan, or poem set to tune, is Benimadhob by Joy Goswami. She is a popular singer in other genres like Folk, Modern Bengali Songs, and Rabindra sangeet.

== Early life ==
Mitra was born in Gangarampur, South Dinajpur, West Bengal, India. She was born into a musical and cultured middle-class family. Mitra studied from Basanti Devi College, Kolkata a University of Calcutta affiliated college.

She is married to Music Director Joy Sarkar.

Later in life she became a successful entrepreneur, running several ventures:

Protha - A very successfully run boutique in Kolkata.

Gaan Mon - Mitra's music institution is named Gaan Mon which has two branches in Kolkata and Durgapur.

Lopamudra Mitra's Production - A music level recording company, successfully run by Mitra and her husband, Jor Sarkar.

Sohoj Porob - Kolkata's one of premier annual music program, organized every year in Kolkata.

She also runs a trust which deals with Bengal's true folk culture, handicrafts in the regions of Shantiniketan, Bankura, and Purulia.

== Discography ==
Modern Songs Albums

- Annya Hawa (1996)
- Annya Hawar Annya Gaan (1999)
- Sankota Dulcchey (1999)
- Bhalobashtey Bolo (2000)
- Dakchey Akash (2001)
- Kobita Theke Gaan (2002)
- Ei Abelay (2003)
- E Ghar Tokhon (2003)
- Pran Khola Gaan (2003)
- Jhor Hote Pari (2004)
- Ek Tukro Road (2005)
- Emono Hoy (2006)
- Chhata Dhoro (2007)
- Po e Pora Fo e Fail (2008)
- Gaalfuluni Khukumoni (2009)
- Monfokira (2011)
- Vande Mataram (2014)

Tagore songs

- Bisshmoye (Tagore songs)(2004)
- Kotha Seshe (Tagore songs)
- O mor Dorodiya (Tagore songs)
- Mone Rekho (Tagore songs, 2006)
- Ananda - The Ecstasy (Music arrangement by Joy Sarkar and Durbadal Chatterjee, 2009)
- Khoma Koro Prabhu (2015)

Basic albums (Collaborative)

- Notun Ganer Nouka Bawa (1997) (with Kabir Suman)
- Bhitor Ghorey Bristi (1998) (with Kabir Suman)
- Ganbela (2004) (with Srikanto Acharya)
- Surer Doshor (with Srikanto Acharya)
- Shapmochan (Tagore dance drama – with Srikanto Acharya and others)

Mixed

- Choto Boro Miley (1996) (Suman, Nachiketa, Anjan, Lopamudra and Indrani Sen)

== Awards ==
She won many awards for her unique dramatic style of singing, which is fashioned with the classical aid and tenor voice quality.

- Gold Disc Award by His Master's Voice in Completion of 10th year of her music life.
- Bengal Film Journalists' Association - Best Female Playback Award for Sedin Chaitramash.
- Best Singer & Best Album of the year, 2001, from Anandabazar Patrika for Bhalobaste Balo.
- Best Singer, Star Jalsa Award, 2011.
