= Shyamal Sen Smriti Samman =

Bengali arts award

- Shyamal Sen Memorial Award
- Awarded for: Outstanding work in Bengali art, theater, and film
- Sponsored by: In memory of Justice Shyamal Kumar Sen
- Country: India

Shyamal Sen Smriti samman (Shyamal Sen Memorial award) is an award given for outstanding work in Bengali art, theater and film. The award is named after ex-Governor of West Bengal (199), Justice Shyamal Kumar Sen. Noted awardees include sculptor Sudip Bakshi (1999), playwright Bratya Basu (2000), and film-maker Atanu Ghosh (2008).
