= Rupkatha Noy =

2013 Indian Bengali drama film

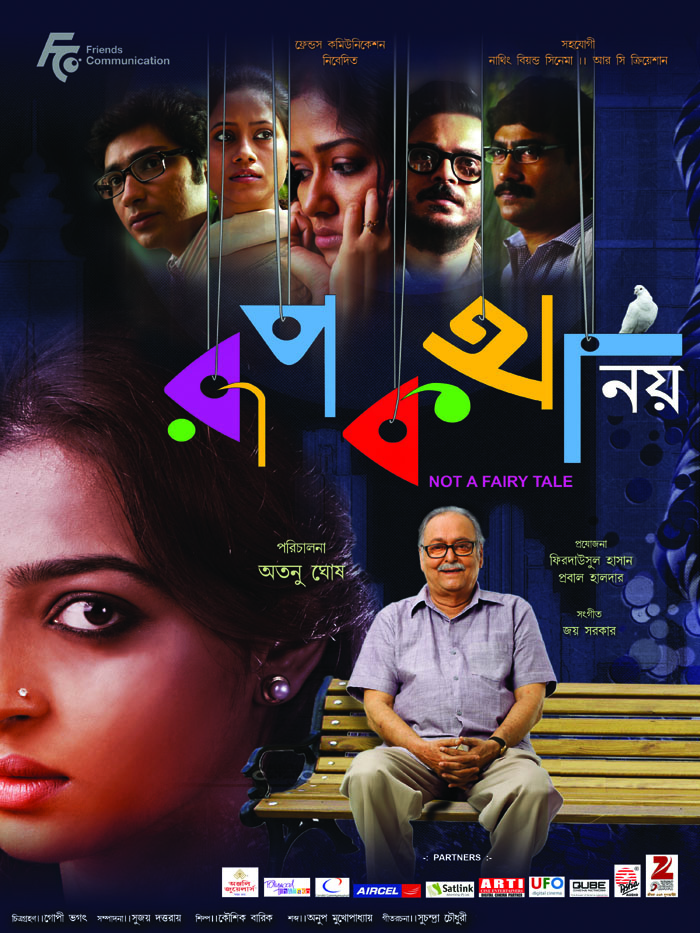
- Directed by: Atanu Ghosh
- Written by: Atanu Ghosh
- Screenplay by: Atanu Ghosh
- Story by: Atanu Ghosh
- Produced by: Firdausul Hasan; Probal Halder
- Starring: Soumitra Chatterjee; Radhika Apte; Kaushik Sen; Rahul; Nina Chakraborty; Sohini Sarkar; Gaurav Chakrabarty
- Cinematography: Gopi Bhagat
- Edited by: Sujoy Dutta Ray
- Music by: Joy Sarkar
- Distributed by: Friends Communication
- Release date: 6 September 2013 (Kolkata)
- Running time: 111 mins
- Country: India
- Language: Bengali

Rupkatha Noy is a 2013 Indian Bengali film directed by Atanu Ghosh and produced by Firdausal Hassan and Probal Halder for Friends Communication. The music was composed by Joy Sarkar.

== Plot ==
Sisir Roy is a 72-year-old man, long retired from a government office as Upper Division Clerk. His family consists of his son Prasanta and daughter-in-law Mandira. Sisir's wife died many years ago. Every day, Sisir goes to the park and interacts with different people. Over a period of time, five young people become acquainted with him. Ahana, a newly married girl, restless and immature, who repeatedly flees from her in-law's place, much to the anxiety of people close to her. Her newly married husband Prasit is quite baffled about her behaviour and is desperately on the lookout for a solution. Saswata is a 35-year-old man who teaches Mathematics in a boys' school. For the last eleven years, he has been entrusted to teach Calculus. Saswata has no thrill in life and is desperately in search of that. Sananda, a 30-year-old IT engineer, is a single mother of a 3-year-old child. Sananda has a dreadful past, which keeps haunting her. Biswanath is a typist who sits on one side of the park, quite aware that the number of customers is rapidly dwindling as more and more people prefer electronic type using computers, but he does not have the means to buy a computer. Reena is a young girl, working at a petrol pump, who is struggling against an uncertain future and insecurity. All these five people are either going through or on the verge of a crisis in their lives. In midst of such a situation, Sisir's son and daughter-in-law leave for Meerut. And now Sisir is left completely alone. Detached from his own kin, Sisir now reaches out to his extended family by involving himself more intimately with the four new people in his life. He touches upon their minds trying to change their thoughts, and in turn, their lives. But in the process, he puts his own life into a vortex of complexities.

== Cast ==
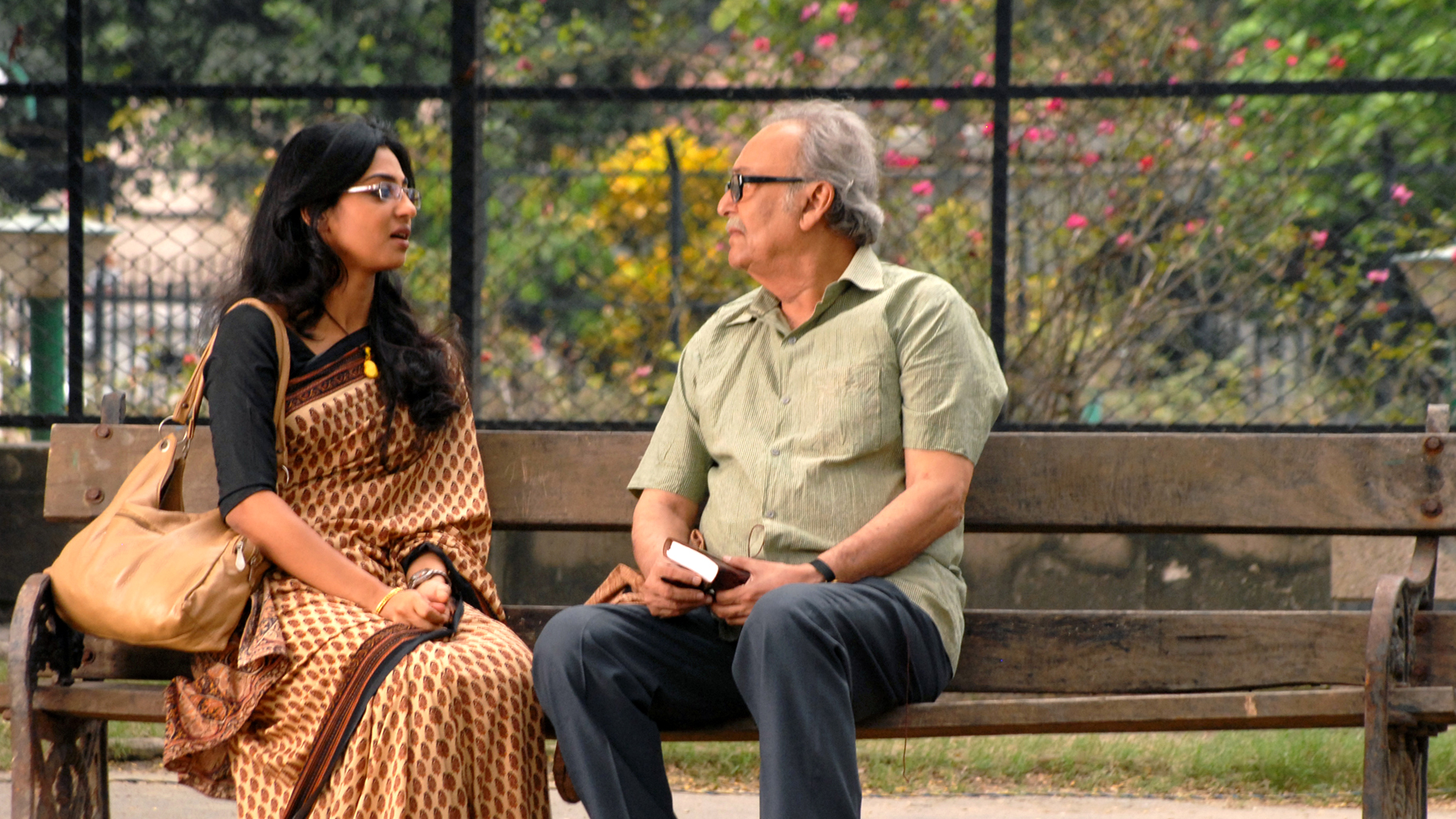
Soumitra Chatterjee and Radhika Apte in Rupkatha Noy

- Soumitra Chatterjee as Sisir
- Radhika Apte as Sananda
- Kaushik Sen as Saswata
- Indraneil Sengupta as Sananda's husband
- Rahul as Biswanath
- Sohini Sarkar as Ahana
- Gaurav Chakrabarty as Prasit
- Nina Chakrabarty as Reena
- Bhaskar Banerjee as Prasanta
- Soma Chakrabarty as Mandira
- Arindam Sil as Prasanta's friend

== Awards and festivals ==
- Nominated for FIPRESCI Award for Best Indian Film 2013
- Filmfare Awards

Best Director (Critic's Choice) - Atanu Ghosh
Best Actor (Critic's Choice) - Soumitra Chatterjee
Best Playback (Female) – Anwesha Dutta Gupta (Saradin aar Sararaat)
Best Debut Actor – Sohini Sarkar

- Best Director Award - Noida International Film Festival 2014
- Hyderabad Bengali Film Festival
- Official Selection

Competitive Section - Dhaka International Film Festival 2014
Competitive Section - Bangalore International Film Festival 2013
Indian Panorama - Chennai International Film Festival 2013
Competitive Section - Noida International Film Festival 2014
Spectrum Asia - Third Eye Asian Film Festival 2014
Indian Showcase - Delhi International Film Festival 2013
World Panorama - Shanghai International Film Festival 2014

== See also ==
- Angshumaner Chhobi
- Takhan Teish
