= Chandrani Banerjee =

Indian singer

Chandrani Banerjee চন্দ্রানী ব্যানার্জি
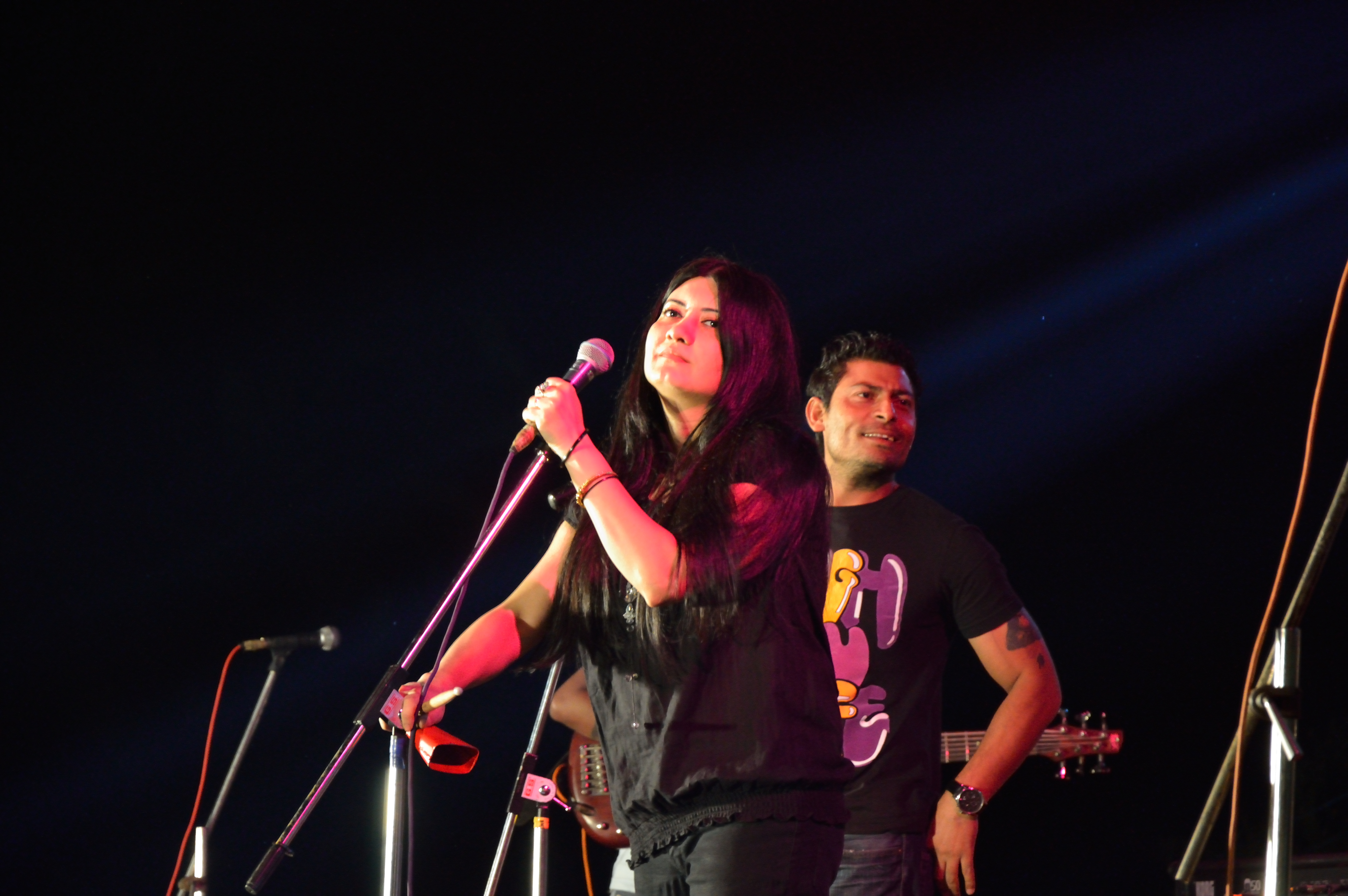
- Born: Chandannagar
- Citizenship: Indian
- Education: HarvardX
- Occupations: Singer; songwriter
- Years active: 20 years
- Awards: Grassroot Grammy
- Musical career
- Genres: Rock; folk
Krosswindz

Chandrani Banerjee চন্দ্রানী ব্যানার্জি (born in Chandannagar) is an Indian Bengali singer and songwriter. She is the first Bengali female rock singer.

== Life and career ==
Banerjee was born in Chandannagar, West Bengal, India. She received her bachelor's in English language and literature from Gokhale Memorial Girls College. She earned a diploma in English Literature (British and Commonwealth) from HarvardX.

She is trained in Rabindra Sangeet and has worked in rock and folk music. She is a part of Krosswindz as the lead vocalist and songwriter. She also has been a part of Bangla band Bhoomi.

In 1999, she sang for the Bengali Band Moheener Ghoraguli for the song- "Ghare Feraar Gaan" on the album Khyepar Gaan. She sang for the award-winning film "Way Back Home" which won the BBC Audience Award at the Commonwealth Film Festival UK. She has sung for the film Ujaane Poddo Bhashe music directed by Vikramjit Banerjee. She sang for the film Projapoti Biskut directed by Anindya Chatterjee and won the best playback singer award from Filmfare.

In 2014, she sang for the film Chaya Manush directed by Arindam Dey under the musical direction of Anupam Roy. In 2021, notation of her 2 songs, Jowar and Jhora Palok from Krosswindz was released by Los Angeles-based label 'Play the Groove'.

== Discography ==
Year	Album name	Record label
1995	Great Indian Rock Vol 1	RSJ Records New Delhi
1996	Great Indian Rock Vol2	RSJ Records New Delhi
1999	Khyapar Gaan	Asha Audio
2000	Bhoomi Jatra shuru	Bhoomi
2001	Bhoomi Udaan	Bhoomi
2002	One World	Kosmic Music
2002	Bhebe Dekhecho Ki	Kosmic Music
2003	Music of the Globe	Joe Anthony Productions, USA
2004	Jhiko Jhiko	Sagarika Music Pvt. Ltd.
2005	Misiki Misiki	Sagarika Music Pvt. Ltd.
2006	Dhoan	Sagarika Music Pvt. Ltd.
2011	Phire Dekha	Sa Re Ga Ma
2012	India Rocks Vol2(Refrain)	EMI Virgin
2015	Jhora Palok	CD BABY USA

== Accolades ==
In 2020, she won 2 Grassroot Grammy (JPF) Awards for her songs with Krosswindz. She was nominated for the Grassroot Grammy's (JPF) held in Nashville for 2 consecutive years for her rendition of a folk song "Tangra Tobu Takon Jaye " and her composition" Jajabor Pokkhi" respectively. In 2018, she won West Bengal Film Journalists' Association Award for Best Female Playback Singer for "Tomake Bujhina Priyo" from Projapoti Biskut.
