= Bhoomi (band) =

Indian urban folk music group from Kolkata

Bhoomi ভূমি
- Origin: Kolkata, West Bengal, India
- Genres: Folk, fusion
- Years active: 1999–present
- Labels: Saregama, Times Music, Universal Music Group
- Members: Soumitra Ray; Hemanta Goswami; Abhijit Ghosh; Robin Lai; Arjyesh Ray
- Past members: Surojit Chatterjee; Chandrani Banerjee; Vikramjit Banerjee
- Website: http://www.bhoomiband.com

Bhoomi (ভূমি) (literally means earth) is a Bengali urban folk music group based in Kolkata, West Bengal, India. Formed in 1999, it soon become hugely popular and performed in various local, national and international platforms. In July 2006 they performed at the United Nations headquarters in New York City. Bhoomi has also performed at the Montreal Jazz Festival in 2008.

== Style ==
Bhoomi's genre has been described by the Times of India as "urban folk." The band uses a fusion of modern, urban lyrics with rural Bengali folk tunes like baul, which was a very early style of music by wandering minstrels in rural Bengal or Bhatiyali (traditionally sung by the boatmen on the Ganges and also the Padma in Bangladesh). They have also re-done old folk songs which were unknown to the modern day urban Bengali and revived such gems with an infusion of fresh music and a lively spirit and pep to the old songs.

The band's efforts have been to expand their brand of urban music beyond the college campus and youth circuit to the older listeners. One of their main inspirations behind their music is everyday city life, which they experience and which is experienced by so many people everywhere. One of Bhoomi's first released songs 'Barandaye Roddur' went on to become a mainstream hit and is still immensely popular today.

Their popularity is rooted in a unique sound that combines a variety of traditional folk tunes with an array of western rhythms with western instrumentation and mixed harmoniously with Bengal's folk instruments like the Khamak, Ektara, Khonjoni, etc.

== Members ==
Their current line-up includes 5 band members -

- Soumitra Ray – Songwriter, Composer, Lead vocals, Drums, Congas, Bongos and Percussion
- Hemanto Goswami – Acoustic, Electric Guitar and backing vocalist
- Abhijit Ghosh – Bass Guitar and backing vocals
- Robin Lai – Keyboards, Violin, Harmonium and also the sound engineer of the band
- Arjyesh Ray – drums

== Former members ==
- Surojit Chatterjee – Songwriter, Composer, Lead vocals, Guitar, Tabla
- Late Sanjoy Mukherjee – Percussion
- Chandrani Banerjee – Vocals
- Vikramjit Banerjee – Acoustic and Electric Guitars
- Jhuppa Bose – Keyboards
- Richard Gasper – Keyboards

== Albums ==
- Jatra Shuru (2000) – Times Music
- Udaan (2001) – Times Music
- Isspecial (2002) – Times Music
- Paal Chhuteche (2003) – Saregama
- Lokgeeti Local (2004) – Times Music
- Dekhtey Dekhtey (2004) – Saregama
- Bojhaai Kora Gaaner Gaari (2005) – Saregama
- Gaan Bahan (2007) – Times Music
- Lokegeetir Deshe (2008) – Times Music
- Aamra Nuton Joubaneri Doot (Rabindrasangeet) (2009) – Times Music
- Gaan Doriyay (2010) – Universal Music India
- Doshe Pa (2010) – Times Music
- Desh Jurrey (2011) – Universal Music India
- Ekir Mikir (2016) – Universal Music India
- Prem Pagol (2018) – Hindusthan Records (INRECO)
