= Samantaral =

2017 Indian Bengali-language film

- Directed by: Partho Chakraborty
- Screenplay by: Padmanabha Dasgupta
- Produced by: Tarak Nath Saha, Soumya Sarkar
- Starring: Parambrata Chatterjee; Soumitra Chatterjee; Riddhi Sen; Surangana Bandyopadhyay; Aparajita Adhya; Tanusree Chakraborty
- Cinematography: Supriyo Dutta
- Edited by: Sujay Datta Ray
- Music by: Indraadip Dasgupta
- Release date: 24 November 2017
- Country: India
- Language: Bengali

Samantaral (transl. Parallel) is a 2017 Indian Bengali-language psychological drama film, directed by Partha Chakraborty. It stars Parambrata Chatterjee and Riddhi Sen. It was nominated at the 2018 Filmfare Awards for Best Film (Critics). Chatterjee received nominations for Best Actor in a Leading Role (Male) - Popular and Critics Award for Best Actor (Male).

== Plot ==
Arko returns to his maternal uncles' house to meet his extended family. Over there, he meets his second uncle Sujan who is always locked in a room because of his presumed mental illness. Arko seeks permission from his grandfather to allow him to take Sujan out of the house for some time, much to the chagrin of his other uncles and aunt. As Arko sees his uncle more closely, he realizes that something very wrong has happened to him and the family is hiding a secret. Finally it has been revealed that uncle Sujan is intersex and the family has always wanted to keep this identity shut from the outside world. Uncle Sujan commits suicide at the end and donates his eyes to his abusive younger brother.

== Cast ==
- Parambrata Chatterjee as Sujan
- Riddhi Sen as Arko
- Soumitra Chatterjee as Akhilesh Chatterjee, Sujan's father
- Surangana Bandyopadhyay as Titli, Arko's girlfriend
- Kushal Chakraborty as Supriyo, the eldest son
- Aparajita Adhya as Raai, Eldest daughter-in-law
- Anindya Banerjee as Kaushik, the youngest son
- Tanusree Chakraborty as Piya, youngest daughter-in-law
- Sayantani Guhathakurta as Runi, youngest daughter, Arko's mother (deceased)
- Sidhu as Sambit, the psychiatrist
