= Jodi Ekdin (2010 film) =

- Directed by: Riingo Banerjee
- Starring: Indraneil Sengupta; Priyanka Sarkar
- Edited by: Riingo Banerjee; Rabiranjan Maitra
- Music by: Joy Sarkar
- Release date: 30 April 2010
- Country: India
- Language: Bengali

Jodi Ekdin is a 2010 Indian Bengali-language romantic drama directed by Riingo Banerjee. A remake of the film If Only (2004), the film stars Indraneil Sengupta and Priyanka Sarkar.

== Cast ==
- Indraneil Sengupta as Neil Basu
- Priyanka Sarkar as Nikita Choudary
- Saheb Bhattacharya as a magician
- Rii Sen as Nikita's friend
- Rabiranjan Maitra as AR
- Riingo Banerjee as an audience member (cameo appearance)
- Chandrabindoo (cameo appearance)

== Reception ==
A critic from The Telegraph wrote, "we would have loved an Indianised — rather Bengali — version of If Only — if only Riingo had pulled it off. The film’s core issue — protagonists in a live-in relationship — is a first for Tollywood". A critic from The Times of India wrote, "Unlike the original film, Jodi Ekdin has nothing much to offer except the cinematography and the music. It leaves a lasting impression on the viewers’ mind". Shoma A Chaterji of IBN Live wrote, "The film is Riingo's career-best till date. Though the mystery is lifted in the end, you never stop wondering about which part was a dream and which, the reality?"
