= Projapoti Biskut =

2017 film directed by Anindya Chatterjee

- Directed by: Anindya Chatterjee
- Produced by: Shiboprosad Mukherjee; Nandita Roy
- Starring: Ishaa Saha; Aditya Sengupta; Shantilal Mukherjee
- Edited by: Arghyakamal Mitra
- Music by: Aditya Sengupta; Prasen
- Production company: Windows Production
- Distributed by: Eros International
- Release date: 22 September 2017
- Country: India
- Language: Bengali
- Box office: ₹2.15 crore (14 days)

Projapoti Biskut (Bengali: প্রজাপতি বিস্কুট) is a 2017 Bengali film directed by Anindya Chatterjee.

== Plot ==
Sraboni / Shaon and Antor Sen have been married for 2 years and 5 months; they live in a joint family with Antor's parents, brother, sister-in-law and niece. Unbeknownst to her draconian, Rabindrasangeet-loving, idealist mother-in-law, Shaon has a career writing scripts for Bengali soaps (watching which too are strictly forbidden in the household). In contrast to the fiercely independent Shaon, Antor is usually indecisive and equivocates every time he is asked for his opinion on any matter.

Shaon and Antor are unable to conceive because Shaon suffers from polyendocrine metabolic ovarian syndrome (PMOS) - something which causes her a lot of mental anguish. When Shaon's friend, Parijat Mukherjee, becomes pregnant by her boyfriend, Matthew, and wants to abort the baby, Shaon convinces her to go ahead with the pregnancy and gives her the word that she will adopt the baby and provide it a fine upbringing. Shaon's short-lived dreams of motherhood, however, are soon shattered when Matthew comes back and takes responsibility of the child and Parijat goes back on her word.

The heartbreak, in addition to her frustration with the restrictive household, causes Shaon to leave her in-laws' home and go back to her eccentric father and mother. However, Antor and Shaon soon run into each other and Shaon expresses her wish to go out for a beer with her estranged husband. Subsequently, the two celebrate their wedding anniversary by checking into a cheap hotel in Diamond Harbour. At the hotel, Shaon confesses that she values her independence of thought, dressing and cultural taste - and was rather restrained in Antor's house. As they are about to reconcile, the couple is arrested by the police on charges of immoral behaviour - something that they manage to escape once Antor's elder brother turns up at the police station with their marriage certificate.

Antor becomes disillusioned with the city and welcomes the transfer to Bhilai. Two days before his journey, he asks Shaon to meet him one last time. As they meet, Shaon tells Antor that she is willing to accompany him to Bhilai. A grateful Antor tells her that he will give her whatever she wants in Bhilai, indicating her freedom in his company as well as motherhood.

== Cast ==
- Aditya Sengupta as Antor
- Ishaa Saha as Shaon
- Kheya Chattopadhyay as Parijat
- Sonali Gupta as Antor's mother
- Rajat Ganguly as Antor's father
- Aparajita Adhya as Shaon's mother
- Shantilal Mukherjee as Shaon's father
- Rajatava Dutta as Antor's office colleague Niyogi Da
- Priyanka Mondal as Darshana
- Anirban Mullick as Ananjan
- Toshana as Fuchka

== Reception ==
Sourav Paldhi, in his lukewarm review for Ananda Bazaar Patrika, highlighted Sengupta's acting, but was put . Sudip Ghosh's review in Ei Samay praised director's attempt at tackling contemporary social issues honestly.

== Soundtrack ==
Soundtrack
Song title	Music director	Lyricist	Singer	Length
Mukhchora Gaan	Shantanu Moitra	Anindya Chatterjee	Shilpa Rao	04:54
Ahare Mon	Anupam Roy	Anupam Roy	Anupam Roy	03:18
Tomake Bujhina Priyo	Prasen	Ritam Sen	Chandrani Banerjee	05:27
Projapoti Biskut (Title Song)	Anindya Chatterjee	Anindya Chatterjee	Diptarko Bose, Lagnajita Chakraborty	03:11

== Achievements ==
The movie won the WBFJA Award 2018 in the following categories:

- Best Playback Singer (Female)- Chandrani Banerjee for Tomake Bujhina Priyo
- Best Lyrics- Ritam Sen for Tomake Bujhina Priyo

The movie won Filmfare Award 2018 in the following categories:

- Best Actress Critics- Ishaa Saha
- Best Cinematographer- Supriyo Dutta
- Best Production Design- Madhuja Banerjee
