= Anjan Das =

Indian film director (1949–2014)

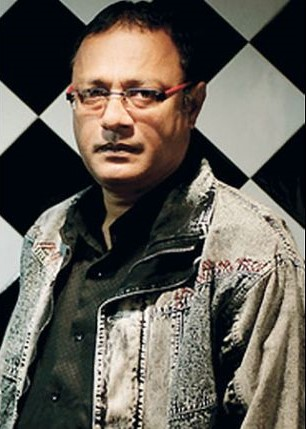
- Born: 17 November 1949; Bagerhat District, Bangladesh
- Died: 2 June 2014 (aged 64); Kolkata, West Bengal, India
- Occupation: Film director

Anjan Das (17 November 1949 – 2 June 2014) was an internationally acclaimed National Award winning film director, screenwriter, and producer known for his contribution to Indian parallel cinema. His films were designated as 'poetry on celluloid', a descriptor used by the critics post his lyrical masterpiece 'Saanjhbatir Rupkathara'. His films won 11 BFJA awards and were regularly showcased at A-list film festivals like BFI London, Rotterdam, IFFI, Brisbane, etc.

== Career ==
Das begun his film making journey in the mid-1970s, debuting with documentaries such as "The Art of Anant Malakar" and "Tripura." His inaugural feature, Sainik (Soldier), premiered at various international film festivals, including Berlinale in 1976, further expanding its reach to Mannheim, Tehran, Kraków, Mongolia, Yugoslavia, and the San Remo Film Competition in Italy.

In 2001, Das created Saanjhbatir Roopkathara.

In 2006, he made the film Faltu (The Saga of Ranirghat, 2006), which won him the National Film Award for Best Feature Film on Family Welfare. In 2007, he made Jara Bristite Bhijechhilo (Drenched... in the rain), for which he won the Special Director's Award at Almaty, Kazakhstan, and two awards in Madrid, Spain: Best Actress and Special Jury Award for the Director. This film also was an entry in the Indian Panorama of International Film Festival of India 2007.

He won 11 Bengal Film Journalists' Association Awards for the last three films. He made a documentary on the rebel poet Kazi Nazrul Islam, produced by the Ministry of External Affairs, Government of India and was inaugurated by the then External Affairs minister, Pranab Mukherjee at a function at Habitat Center, New Delhi.

Thereafter, he also made a few documentaries produced by PSBT and Films Division, which include Maa Durga (on goddess Durga) and Flow & Ebb (on the boatmen of Bengal). His feature film Swarger Nichey Manush (People under Heaven) starring Rituparna Sengupta was showcased at Mumbai Film Festival, Osian's Cinefan Festival of Asian and Arab Cinema and others. but was not released commercially at that time. All the films listed above were shown at Osian's Cinefan Festival of Asian and Arab Cinema.

His film Achin Pakhi (A Love Story) had its International Premiere at Cairo International film Festival 2010 and World Premiere under Indian Panorama at International Film Festival of India 2010. His next film Banshiwala (The Flautist), based on Shirshendu Mukhopadhyay's novel of the same name won him two international awards - Golden Kahuna Award at Honolulu Film Awards 2011 and Bronze Palm Award at Mexico International Film Festival 2011. It was also showcased at New Jersey International Film Festival. His next film, Bedeni (The Snake-Charmer's Wife) was based on Tarashankar Bandopadhyay's novel and starred Rituparna Sengupta.

His last film was Ajana Batas (The Mystic Wind), which starred Paoli Dam and was based on Joy Goswami's novel. It had its premiere at International Film Festival of India 2013 (Indian Panorama). It also won him the Bronze Palm Award at Mexico International Film Festival 2014. It was officially selected (in competition) at Washington DC South Asian Film Festival 2014, Indian International Film Festival of Queensland 2014, and Fer Film Festival 2015. It competed for the Conch shell Award at Belize International Film Festival 2014. The film garnered critical acclaim and was released commercially nine months after his demise.

== Filmography ==
=== Director ===
- Sainik (1976)
- Saanjhbatir Roopkathara (2002)
- Iti Srikanta (2004)
- Faltu (2005)
- Jara Bristite Bhijechhilo (2007)
- Achin Pakhi (2010);
- Banshiwala (2010)
- Bedeni (2011)
- Ajana Batas (2014)
- Swarger Nichey Manush

=== Producer ===
- Disarray (2012) (short film)

=== Writer ===
- Faltu (2005)
- Banshiwala (2010)
- Ajana Batas (2014)

== See also ==
- Sekhar Das
