= Angshumaner Chhobi =

- Poster of Angshumaner Chhobi
- Directed by: Atanu Ghosh
- Written by: Atanu Ghosh
- Produced by: T. Sarkar Productions
- Starring: Soumitra Chatterjee, Indrani Halder, Tota Roy Chowdhury, Ananya Chatterjee, Sabyasachi Chakrabarty, Rudranil Ghosh, Anjana Basu, Bhaskar Banerjee, Pijush Ganguly, Soma Chakrabarty and Indraneil Sengupta
- Cinematography: Sandeep Sen
- Edited by: Sujoy Dutta Roy
- Music by: Rocket Mondol
- Distributed by: T. Sarkar Productions
- Release date: 21 August 2009
- Running time: 125 minutes
- Country: India
- Language: Bengali

Angshumaner Chhobi (2009) is the debut feature film of Atanu Ghosh and had its premiere at the 40th International Film Festival of India, Goa. It was selected in the Competitive Section of the festival in one of the two Indian entries.

== Plot ==
The story is about a journey of four people, Pradyut, Madhura, Neel and Angshuman, through the making of a film. Legendary actor, Pradyut, had chosen a life of exile. Madhura, National Awardee for her debut film, now leads a frustrated existence. Neel, passionate about dance and astronomy, chances on something that changes his destiny. Angshuman, returns from Italy eight years after completing a course in film direction. He has an interesting script on the curious relationship between a septuagenarian celebrity painter and a young nurse. The project is a non-starter with constant setbacks. A crime occurs brings emotional crises to a peak. Despite all adversities, Angshuman is determined to see his dream project through.

=== Detailed storyline ===
Angshumaner Chhobi (a film by Angshuman) deals with the relentless efforts of Angshuman (played by Indraneil Sengupta), a young film director who comes back from Italy after eight years, having studied cinema there, to make his first film. He puts up a determined fight against all obstacles to complete his film. As he is struggling with his goal, the story passes through many mutations - emotional drama, humor and the detection of crime. Along the way, other issues come up. Among these are the eternal tussle faced by every creative person between his mind and his emotions, the psyche of being in and out of the limelight and the inevitable pangs of conscience and humanism faced by celebrities.

In this film-within-a-film, Soumitra Chatterjee has two roles. In the main story, he is a former matinee idol who has become a complete recluse and has cut himself away from the mainstream as much as from cinema. In the film that Angshuman is making, this actor, Pradyut Mukherjee is persuaded to enact the role of a 72-year-old painter suffering from dementia. The painter has an ayaah who looks after him. Indrani Haldar plays the ayaah as the second role in the film-within-the-film.

In the main story, she is Madhura, an actress who won the National Award for Best Actress in her first film. But when Angshuman approaches her, after a stint in commercial films of little merit but good money, Madhura is now a popular jatra artiste with little connection with films. Angshuman had visualized these two actors for the two main roles for his first film and he is unwilling to compromise.

Tota Roychoudhury plays the enigmatic Neel, who had been passionate about dance and astronomy and gets curiously involved with Angshuman's film.

The detection of crime also plays an important role in bringing out the psychological interactions in a celebrity's life. These are strikingly different from those of the common man. So the usual concept of crime and punishment does not hold true here. An alleged suicide becomes the talk of the town for its mysterious nature and is handed over to the CID, Crime Branch, for investigation. The person assigned to the case is Sourjya Roy, SP, CID, whose no-nonsense analytical skills suggest that it was not a suicide but homicide. Ananya Chatterjee plays the role of this different police officer.

== Cast ==
- Indraneil Sengupta as Angshuman
- Soumitra Chatterjee as Pradyut
- Indrani Halder as Madhura
- Tota Roy Chowdhury as Neel
- Ananya Chatterjee as Sourya
- Sabyasachi Chakrabarty as Bikashranjan
- Rudranil Ghosh as Rajiv
- Anjana Basu as Sonali
- Bhaskar Banerjee as Somnath
- Soma Chakrabarty as Bindu
- Pijush Ganguly
- Debesh Roy Chowdhury
- Kaushik Sen

== Singers and music ==
Rupam Islam, Prateek Chowdhury, Subhomita Banerjee, Anwesha Datta Gupta, Sumana Chakraborty and Bhoomi provide vocals on the soundtrack. The film's soundtrack music was composed by Rocket Mondol.

== Awards and festivals ==
Selected in Indian Panorama and Competitive Section of 40th International Film Festival of India, 2009. Selected in Competitive Section of 11th Dhaka International Film Festival, 2010. Winner of 2 Anandalok Awards. Winner of Aravindan Puraskaram for Best Debut Film 2009. Winner of Lankesh Chitra Prashasti for Best Debut Film 2009. BFJA Award for Most Promising Director of 2009. The film also won Best Supporting Actor (Soumitra Chatterjee) and Best Editor (Sujoy Dutta Roy) at the Asia Pacific Film Festival in Taipei, 2010 besides 14 other national and international awards for its cast and crew members.
