= Atanu Ghosh =

Indian film director and screenwriter

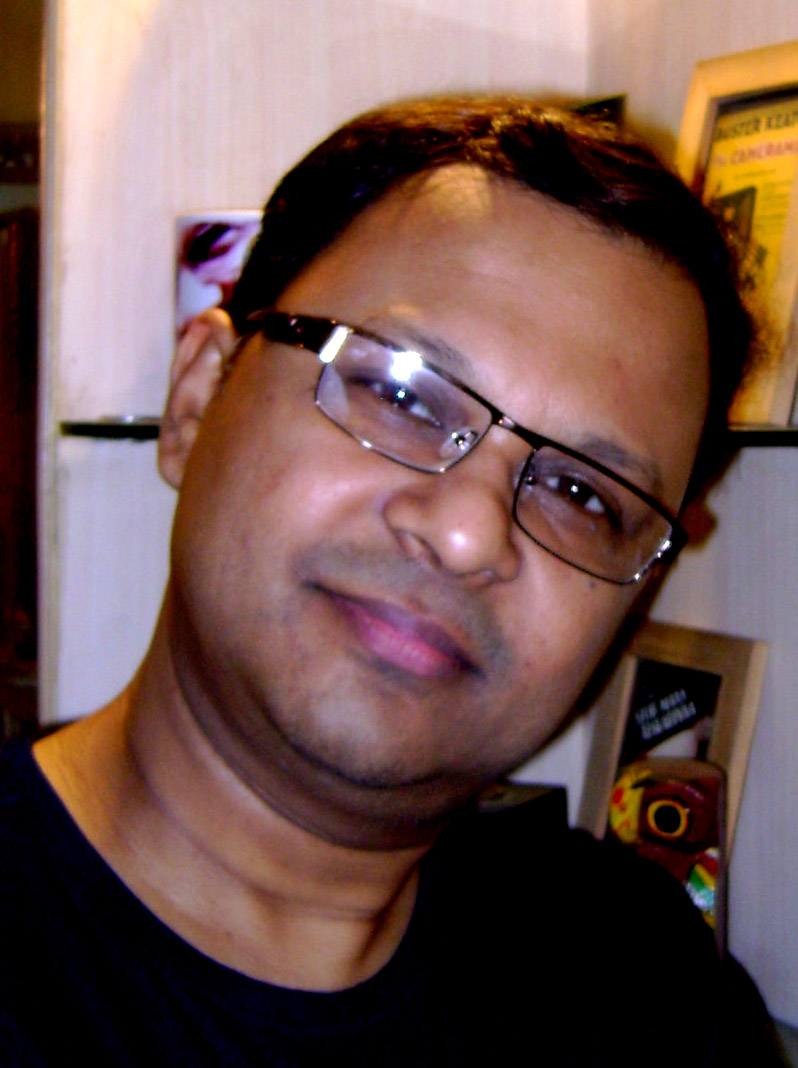
- Born: Kolkata, West Bengal, India
- Education: University of Calcutta
- Occupations: Film director; Screenwriter

Atanu Ghosh is an Indian film director, screenwriter, author and teacher who works in the Bengali film industry. Ghosh started his career as a scriptwriter and director for documentary films in 1996. Then he started directing telefilms with Disha (2003). He made his directorial debut in feature films with Angshumaner Chhobi (2009). His film Mayurakshi (2017) was awarded the National Film Award for Best Feature Film in Bengali at the 65th National Film Awards. Besides Mayurakshi, his other feature films including Shesh Pata, Binisutoy, Abby Sen and Rupkatha Noy have received multiple awards and have been critically acclaimed at multiple film festivals..

== Early life and education ==
Ghosh completed his post-graduation in journalism from the University of Calcutta. Following that, he started his career in 1996 as scriptwriter and director of documentary films. Thereafter, he branched out to fictional serials and telefilms. He wrote a play for National School of Drama, New Delhi entitled "Ruh-ba-Ruh" directed by Kaushik Sen.

He received the Doordarshan National Award for Best Children's telefilm Aar ek Bampi in 2002.Megh Brishti Rodh fetched him the coveted RAPA Award for Best Screenplay. He was awarded the prestigious Shyamal Sen Smriti Samman in 2008.

== Career ==
Ghosh debuted as a director for Bengali telefilms, with Disha (2003). Following it, he has directed 22 more telefilms. Between 2003-2009, Ghosh has worked as scriptwriter and editor for many eminent directors. Besides, he has also directed over 30 documentary and corporate films for different organisations.

Ghosh made his directorial debut in feature films with Angshumaner Chhobi (2009). It was selected in the Indian Panorama Section as well as in the Competitive Section at the 40th International Film Festival of India (2009). The film won the Aravindan Puraskaram for the Best Debut Film of 2009, "Karnataka State Award for India's Best Debut Director", BFJA Award as well as the "Audience Award" at the "Rainbow Film Festival" in London, besides 13 other national and international awards. His second film Takhan Teish (2011) was screened at film festivals in Shanghai, Osaka and other places. His next film Rupkatha Noy (2013) was nominated for the FIPRESCI Award for Best Indian Film 2013. It was also officially selected in multiple film festivals including the Shanghai International Film Festival. It received four Filmfare Awards His fourth film Ek Phaali Rodh (2014), was premiered at the Shanghai International Film Festival in June 2014. His sixth film Mayurakshi received multiple accolades including the National Film Award for Best Bengali Feature Film at the 65th National Film Awards and the Best Film (Critics') at the 3rd Filmfare Awards East. Besides three other international nominations, Mayurakshi was also awarded the prestigious "Chitra Bharathi Samman" for the Best Indian Cinema of 2018 and the WBFJA Award for Best Film and 2 other categories.

== Filmography ==
Key
†	Denotes films that have not yet been released

=== Feature films ===
Year	Film	Director	Writer	Language	Note	Ref.
2009	Angshumaner Chhobi	Yes	Yes	Bengali	Marked his debut as a director in Bengali feature films	
2010	Takhan Teish	Yes	Yes	Bengali		
2013	Rupkatha Noy	Yes	Yes	Bengali		
2014	Ek Phaali Rodh	Yes	Yes	Bengali		
2015	Abby Sen	Yes	Yes	Bengali		
2017	Mayurakshi	Yes	Yes	Bengali	Won the National Film Award for Best Bengali Feature Film at the 65th National Film Awards	
2019	Robibaar	Yes	Yes	Bengali		
2021	Binisutoy	Yes	Yes	Bengali		
2023	Aaro Ek Prithibi	Yes	Yes	Bengali		
2023	Shesh Pata	Yes	Yes	Bengali		

=== Web Originals ===
- 72 Ghanta (2022)

=== Telefilms ===
Year	Film	Director	Writer	Language	Note
2003	Disha	Yes	Yes	Bengali	
2003	Weekend	Yes	Yes	Bengali	
2003	Srishtichhara	Yes	Yes	Bengali	
2003	Amriter Putra	Yes	Yes	Bengali	Selected in the 2nd Kolkata Telefilm Festival
2003	Akashchhoya	Yes	Yes	Bengali	Selected in the 2nd Kolkata Telefilm Festival; Selected in the 10th Kolkata International Film Festival, 2004
2004	700 Square Ft	Yes	Yes	Bengali	Selected in the 2nd Kolkata Telefilm Festival; Nominated for Best Telefilm of the Year at the Anandolok Puraskar, 2004
2004	Sumitra Online	Yes	Yes	Bengali	Winner of Tele Samman Award for Best Telefilm, 2004
2004	Gabhir Asukh	Yes	Yes	Bengali	
2004	Kanta	Yes	Yes	Bengali	
2005	Deadline	Yes	Yes	Bengali	
2005	Megh Bristi Rodh	Yes	Yes	Bengali	Winner of RAPA Award for Best Screenplay
2005	Manthan	Yes	Yes	Bengali	
2005	Asomapto	Yes	Yes	Bengali	Winner of Telly Samman Award for Best Direction, 2005
2005	Mishraraag	Yes	Yes	Bengali	
2006	Aaro Ek Prithibi	Yes	Yes	Bengali	
2006	Aaloy Phera	Yes	Yes	Bengali	Nominated for Telly Samman for Best Telefilm, 2007
2006	Ankush	Yes	Yes	Bengali	Nominated for Best Telefilm at Anandalok Puraskar, 2007
2007	Roopkatha Noy	Yes	Yes	Bengali	
2007	Parampara	Yes	Yes	Bengali	
2007	Premer Galpo	Yes	Yes	Bengali	
2008	Adhara Madhuri	Yes	Yes	Bengali	
2009	Parokiya 2000	Yes	Yes	Bengali	

== Accolades ==
Awards and recognitions (For his feature films)
Year	Award	Ceremony	Category	Film	Result	Ref.
2017	National Film Awards	65th National Film Awards	National Film Award for Best Bengali Feature Film	Mayurakshi	Won	
2014	Filmfare Awards East	1st Filmfare Awards East	Filmfare Award Bangla for Best Film (Critics')	Rupkatha Noy	Won	
2018	Filmfare Awards East	3rd Filmfare Awards East	Filmfare Award Bangla for Best Film	Mayurakshi	Nominated	
2018	Filmfare Awards East	3rd Filmfare Awards East	Filmfare Award Bangla for Best Film (Critics')	Mayurakshi	Won	
2018	Filmfare Awards East	3rd Filmfare Awards East	Filmfare Award Bangla Best Original Story	Mayurakshi	Nominated	
2021	Filmfare Awards Bangla	4th Filmfare Awards Bangla	Filmfare Award Bangla for Best Film (Critics')	Robibaar	Won	
2021	Filmfare Awards Bangla	4th Filmfare Awards Bangla	Filmfare Award Bangla Best Original Story	Robibaar	Nominated	
2021	Filmfare Awards Bangla	4th Filmfare Awards Bangla	Filmfare Award Bangla Best Screenplay	Robibaar	Nominated	
2022	Filmfare Awards Bangla	5th Filmfare Awards Bangla	Filmfare Award Bangla for Best Film (Critics')	Binisutoy	Won	
2022	Filmfare Awards Bangla	5th Filmfare Awards Bangla	Filmfare Award Bangla Best Screenplay	Binisutoy	Nominated	
2024	Filmfare Awards Bangla	7th Filmfare Awards Bangla	Filmfare Award Bangla for Best Film	Shesh Pata	Won	
2024	Filmfare Awards Bangla	7th Filmfare Awards Bangla	Filmfare Award Bangla Best Original Story	Shesh Pata	Won	
2024	Filmfare Awards Bangla	7th Filmfare Awards Bangla	Filmfare Award Bangla Best Dialogue	Shesh Pata	Won	
2024	Filmfare Awards Bangla	7th Filmfare Awards Bangla	Filmfare Award Bangla for Best Film (Critics')	Shesh Pata	Nominated	

== Others ==
Notable films/serials/documentaries:

- Banglar Swadeshi Gaan – a 3-episode series on the patriotic songs of Bengal to commemorate 50 years of Indian independence
- Ebong Computer – a 10 episode fictional series on computers
- Aatanka – a 40 min fictional film on AIDS awareness
- Chalti Hawa – a 10 episode musical series on Bengali Band music
- Goenda Poribar – a 52 episode fiction series
- Icchedana – a 26 episode science fiction series for children
- Ardhek Prithibi – a 26 episode fiction series
- Abaak Prithibi – a 26 episode fiction series

== Bibliography ==
- Bandi Mon Khola Akash (2021)
- Nihsango Nagorik (2023)
