= Takhan Teish =

- Poster
- Directed by: Atanu Ghosh
- Written by: Atanu Ghosh
- Produced by: Tara Film Productions
- Starring: Jisshu Sengupta, Indrani Halder, Paoli Dam, Rajatava Dutta, Neel Mukherjee, Aparajita Ghosh Das, Tanusreeshankar, Biswajit Chakrabarty, Biplab Chatterjee, Locket Chatterjee
- Cinematography: Soumik Haldar
- Edited by: Sujoy Dutta Roy
- Music by: Rocket Mondol and Mayukh Bhoumik
- Distributed by: Piyali Films
- Release date: 21 January 2011
- Running time: 113 minutes
- Country: India
- Language: Bengali

Takhan Teish is a 2010 Bengali film directed Atanu Ghosh which was premiered at the 6th Osaka International Film Festival, Japan. It is Ghosh's second feature film.

== Plot ==
Tamodeep is brilliant, sensitive and eternally perturbed by his grandfather's prophecy that he would either be an artist or run away from home. A junior doctor by profession, Tamodeep has little communication with his near and dear ones, even lesser with his mother Sraboni, against whom he nurses a grudge for intruding into his life during his adolescent years. Quiet and introvert on the surface, Tamodeep is quite restless within. His desires often take complex routes and hover around Meghna, his former biology teacher and now a psychological counselor on radio, Mohini, the sex siren of soft porn movies and Sriparna, a law student whom he befriends on a cyber social networking site. The night before his 23rd birthday, Mohini, gets admitted in his nursing home as an accident victim and Tamodeep's life is destined to change forever.. In his desperate attempt to prevent Mohini from going out of his life, Tamodeep has to go through a series of overlapping events involving the four women in his life - his mother Sraboni, his former teacher Meghna, his Facebook buddy Sriparna and his ultimate fantasy Mohini, who steer him through a unique journey of enlightenment and self-realisation.

== Cast ==
- Jisshu Sengupta as Tamodeep Roy Chaudhury
- Indrani Halder as Meghna Bose
- Paoli Dam as Mohini / Shampa Dasgupta
- Rajatava Dutta as Sandipan
- Aparajita Ghosh Das as Sriparna
- Tanusreeshankar as Sraboni

== Soundtrack ==
| No. | Title | Length |
