= List of Indian Bengali films of the 2000s =

A list of films produced by the Tollywood (Bengali language film industry) based in Kolkata in the 2000s.

== 2000 ==
Title	Director	Cast	Genre	Notes
Aamader Janani	Raj Mukherjee	Soumitra Chatterjee, Dipankar De	Romance	
Aamader Sansar	Dilip Biswas	Firdous Ahmed, Ranjit Mallick	Romance	
Aasroy	Haranath Chakraborty	Prosenjit Chatterjee, Rituparna Sengupta	Drama	
Bariwali	Rituparno Ghosh	Kirron Kher, Roopa Ganguly, Chiranjit Chakraborty	Drama	
Buk Bhara Bhalobasa	Sanat Dutta	Mitali Chakraborty, Lily Chakravarty, Subhendu Chatterjee		
Chaka	Nepal Dev Bhattacharya	Mithun Chakraborty, Debashree Roy	Action	
Dabee	Imon Kalyan Chattopadhyay	Tapas Paul, Satabdi Roy, Abhishek Chatterjee	Romance, Drama	
Joy Maa Durga	Shantilal Soni	Arun Govil, Debashree Roy, Abhishek Chatterjee	Devotional	
Kalankini Badhu	Kalidas Mahanabish	Shakuntala Barua, Nirmal Kumar Chakraborty, Aditi Chatterjee		
Madhur Milan	Tushar Majumdar	Prosenjit Chatterjee, Rituparna Sengupta	Romantic Drama	
Paromitar Ek Din	Aparna Sen	Rituparna Sengupta, Aparna Sen	Drama	
Rin Mukti	Dinen Gupta	Moushumi Chatterjee, Tapas Paul, Jisshu Sengupta		
Pita Swarga Pita Dharma	Milan Bhowmik	Abhishek Chatterjee, Satabdi Roy	Romance, Drama	
Sajoni Aamar Sohag	Anup Sengupta	Satabdi Roy, Prosenjit Chatterjee	Romance	
Sapatha Nilam	Joydev Pariyal	Prosenjit Chatterjee, Satabdi Roy, Ranjit Mallick	Action	
Sasurbari Zindabad	Haranath Chakraborty	Prosenjit Chatterjee, Rituparna Sengupta	Romance	
Shotti Ai To Jibon	Jyoti Prakash Roy	Victor Banerjee, Moon Moon Sen, Moushumi Chatterjee	Romance, Drama	
Utsab	Rituparno Ghosh	Madhabi Mukherjee, Mamata Shankar	Drama	
Uttara	Buddhadev Dasgupta	Jaya Seal, Tapas Paul	Drama	

== 2001 ==
Title	Director	Cast	Genre	Notes
Aaghat	Anup Sengupta	Prosenjit Chatterjee, Subhendu Chatterjee, Rituparna Sengupta	Action	
Aami Jibonpurer Pathik	Nandan Dasgupta	Prosenjit Chatterjee, Satabdi Roy	Romance	
Bhalobasar Pratidhan	Himanshu Parija	Rachana Banerjee, Banku, Rituparna Sengupta		
Dada Thakur	Haranath Chakraborty	Ferdous Ahmed, Ranjit Mallick	Drama	
Dekha	Goutam Ghose	Soumitra Chatterjee, Debashree Roy	Drama	
Ek Je Aachhe Kanya	Subrata Sen	Konkona Sen Sharma, Debashree Roy	Drama	
Guru Shisya	Swapan Saha	Prosenjit Chatterjee, Rituparna Sengupta, Soumitra Chatterjee	Drama	
Jamaibabu Jindabad	Ratan Adhikari	Prosenjit Chatterjee, Rituparna Sengupta	Action, Romance, Drama	
Nadir Paare Aamar Bari	Dilip Bose	Tapas Paul, Satabdi Roy, Arva Banerjee	Romance, Drama	
Ostad	Samar Das	Silajeet Banerjee, Shakuntala Barua, Reshmi Bhattacharya		
Parinati	Samar Das	Silajeet Banerjee, Shakuntala Barua, Reshmi Bhattacharya		
Pratibad	Haranath Chakraborty	Prosenjit Chatterjee, Arpita Paul, Ranjit Mallick	Action	
Rakhi Poornima	Anjan Chakraborty	Chumki Chowdhury, Ranjit Mallick, Tapas Paul		
Shesh Ashray	Ajit Ganguly	Lily Chakravarty, Indrani Haldar	Romance, Drama	
Sindur Niye Khela	Rabi Kinagi	Siddhanta Manmohan Mahapatra, Rachana Banerjee, Bijay Mohanty	Drama	
Sreemati Bhayankari	Anjan Banerjee	Shakuntala Barua, Oindrila Chakraborty, Abhishek Chatterjee		
Sud Asal	Narayan Ghosh	Prosenjit Chatterjee, Anuradha Ray	Drama	
Suorani Duorani	Ladli Mukhopadhyay	Ferdous Ahmed, Ramaprasad Banik, Priya Karfa		

== 2002 ==
Title	Director	Cast	Genre	Notes
Aamar Bhuvan	Mrinal Sen	Arun Mukhopadhyay, Nandita Das	Romance	
Abaidha	Gul Bahar Singh	Chiranjit Chakraborty, Debashree Roy	Romance	
Anamni Angana	Swapan Saha	Soumitra Chatterjee, Lily Chakravarty	Romance	
Annadata	Rabi Kinagi	Prosenjit Chatterjee, Sreelekha Mitra	Drama	
Bangali Babu	Anjan Choudhury	Mithun Chakraborty, Ranjit Mallick	Action, Drama	
Bidrohini Nari	Himangshu Parija	Rachana Banerjee, Hara Pattanayak	Romance	
Bor Kone	Bablu Samaddar	Prosenjit Chatterjee, Soumitra Chatterjee	Romance	
Chandramollika	Anjan Choudhury	Ranjit Mallick, Victor Banerjee	Romance	
Chhelebela	Sukatna Ray	Jisshu Sengupta, Ranjit Mallick	Romance	
Deva	Sujit Guha	Prosenjit Chatterjee, Victor Banerjee	Action	
Devdas	Shakti Samanta	Jisshu Sengupta, Prosenjit Chatterjee	Romance	
Desh	Raja Sen	Abhishek Bachchan, Jaya Bachchan	Romance	
Doityo	Barun Kabasi	Soumitra Chatterjee, June Maliya	Romance	
Dukhiram	K. G. Das	Dilip Ray, Ramaprasad Banik	Romance	
Ektu Chhoa	Dayal Achrya	Jisshu Sengupta, Deepankar De	Romance	
Eri Naam Bhalobasa	Chhotku Ahmed	Rituparna Sengupta, Biplab Chattopadhyay	Romance	
Ferari Fauj	Prashanto Bal	Mithun Chakraborty, Soumitra Chatterjee	Action, Historical Drama	
Gandharbi	Samar Dutta	Soumitra Chatterjee, Tapas Paul	Romance	
Har Har Mahadeb	Bijoy Shukla	Arpita Sengupta, Bablu Mukhopadhyay	Romance	
Haraner Natjamai	Pranab Chowdhury	Soumitra Chatterjee, Abhishek Chattopadhyay	Romance	
Ichchhamoyee Maa	Ajit Ganguly	Nirmal Kumar, Satya Bandyopadhyay	Romance	
Inquilaab	Anup Sengupta	Chiranjit Chakraborty, Prosenjit Chatterjee	Action	
Janam Janamer Sathi	Dulal Bhowmik	Firdous Ahmed, Rituparna Sengupta	Romance	
Jiban Yuddha	Shaha Alam Kiran	Soumitra Chatterjee, Rituparna Sengupta	Romance	
Kurukshetra	Swapan Saha	Prosenjit Chatterjee, Jisshu Sengupta	Action, Romance	
Manush Amanush	Chiranjit	Chiranjit Chakraborty, Jisshu Sengupta	Romance	
Moner Majhe Tumi	K. Basu	Jisshu Sengupta, Arindam	Romance	
Mr. and Mrs. Iyer	Aparna Sen	Rahul Bose, Konkona Sen Sharma	Romance drama	
Nishana	Milan Bhowmik	Ranjit Mallick, Abhishek Chattopadhyay	Romance	
Phul Aar Pathar	Dulal Bhowmik	Firdous Ahmed, Prosenjit Chatterjee	Action	
Pratihinsa	Mohanjit Prasad	Prosenjit Chatterjee, Firdous Ahmed	Romance	
Prem Shakti	Mohanjit Prasad	Firdous Ahmed, Mithun Chakraborty	Romance	
Prohor	Subbhadro Chowdhury	Debashree Roy, Barun Chanda, Shilajit Majumdar	Drama	
Protarak	Pallab Ghosh	Prosenjit Chatterjee, Deepankar De	Action	
Rajasaheb	Partha Sarathi Jowardar	Tapas Paul, Abhishek Chattopadhyay	Romance	
Rakter Sindur	Sangram Biswas	Uttam Mohanti, Mihir Das	Romance	
Sanjhbatir Rupkathara	Anjan Das	Firdous Ahmed, Soumitra Chatterjee	Romance	
Sathi	Haranath Chakraborty	Jeet, Ranjit Mallick	Romance, Musical	
Shatrur Mokabila	Swapan Saha	Prosenjit Chatterjee, Tapas Paul	Romance	
Shiba	Jillu Rahman	Prosenjit Chatterjee, Sabyasachi Chakraborty	Act	
Shilpantar	Bappaditya Bandyopadhyay	Debashree Roy, Mrinal Mukherjee	Romance	
Shubho Mahurat	Rituparno Ghosh	Tota Ray Chowdhury, Raakhee	Crime, Thriller	
Shyamoli	Annapurna Halder	Abhishek Chattopadhyay, Tarun Kumar	Romance	
Sonar Sansar	Anup Sengupta	Prosenjit Chatterjee, Tapas Paul	Romance	
Streer Maryada	Swapan Saha	Prosenjit Chatterjee, Ranjit Mallick	Romance	
Swapner Feriwala	Subrato Sen	Firdous Ahmed, Deepankar De	Romance	
Tak Jhal Mishti	Basu Chatterjee	Firdous Ahmed, Priyanka Trivedi	Romance	
Tantrik	Bablu Samaddar	Madhabi Mukherjee, Anil Chatterjee	Fantasy, Romance	
Titli	Rituparno Ghosh	Konkona Sen Sharma, Aparna Sen, Mithun Chakraborty	Romance	

== 2003 ==
Title	Director	Cast	Genre	Notes
Aandha Prem	Narayan Chatterjee	Prasenjit, Deepankar De	Romance Drama	
Alo	Tarun Majumdar	Rituparna Sengupta, Abhishek Chattopadhyay	Family Drama	
Aamar Mayer Shapath	Dulal Bhowmik	Jeet, Deepankar De	Drama	
Abar Aranye	Goutam Ghose	Jisshu Sengupta, Soumitra Chatterjee	Drama	
Adorini	Biswajit	Biswajit, Prasenjit		
Arjun Aamar Naam	Prabir Nandi	Soumitra Chatterjee, Supriya Choudhury	Action Drama	
Bhalo Theko	Goutam Halder	Soumitra Chatterjee, Vidya Balan		
Biswasghatak	Sukhen Das	Jisshu Sengupta, Ranjit Mallick		
Bombayer Bombete	Sandip Ray	Parambrato Chattopadhyay, Rajatava Dutta	Thriller	
Boumar Banobas	Motiur Rahman Panu	Sumanta Mukhopadhyay, Laboni Sarkar		
Champion	Rabi Kinagi	Jeet, Deepankar De, Srabanti Malakar	Sports Drama	
Chandrokotha	Humayun Ahmed	Ferdous Ahmed, Meher Afroz Shaon	Drama	
Chokher Bali	Rituparno Ghosh	Prasenjit, Aishwarya Rai	Drama	
Chor O Bhagoban	Biplab Chattopadhyay	Chiranjit, Satabdi Roy		
Debipuja	Sukhen Chakraborty	Satabdi Roy, Jnanesh Mukhopadhyay		
Ekti Nadir Naam	Anup Singha	Supriya Choudhury, Gita Dey	Documentary	
Guru	Swapan Saha	Jisshu Sengupta, Mithun Chakraborty	Action	
Hemanter Pakhi	Urmi Chakraborty	Soumitra Chatterjee, Swastika Mukherjee		
Jehad	Bikash Banerjee	Madhabi Mukherjee, Arjun Chakraborty	Action	
Jua	Panchanan Karmakar	Soumitra Chatterjee, Satabdi Roy		
Kartabya	Swapan Saha	Prasenjit, Tapas Paul	Drama	
Ke Apon Ke Par	Bappa Banerjee	Soumitra Chatterjee, Gita Dey	Family Drama	
Mamatamoyee Maa	Sisir Mohanpaty	Uttam Mohanty, Siddhanta Mahapatra		
Mayer Anchal	Anup Sengupta	Prasenjit, Ranjit Mallick	Drama	
Mayer Shakti	Basanta Saha	Hara Pattanayak, Siddhanta Mahapatra		
Mej Didi	Shantimoy Bandyopadhyay	Ranjit Mallick, Debashree Roy		
Memsaheb	Partha Sarathi Jowardar	Jisshu Sengupta, Tapas Paul		
Mon	Bani Das	Abdul Majid, Antara Hazra, Kopil Bora, Nishita Goswami		
Mondo Meyer Upakhyan	Buddhadeb Dasgupta	Tapas Paul, Rituparna Sengupta		
Nater Guru	Haranath Chakraborty	Jeet, Ranjit Mallick	Romance, Drama	
Nil Nirjane	Subrato Sen	Rajatava Dutta, June Maliya		
Parampar	Pranab Kumar Das	Abaninath Bhattacharya, Antara Hazra		
Pardeshi Babu	Hara Pattanayak	Firdous Ahmed, Supriya Choudhury		
Patalghar	Abhijit Chowdhury	Soumitra Chatterjee, Biplab Chattopadhyay	Science Fiction	
Path	Pintu Chatterjee	Rituparna Sengupta, Rajatava Dutta		
Rakhe Hari Mare Ke	Ratan Adhikari	Prasenjit, Sabyasachi Chakrabarty	Action, Comedy	
Rakta Bandhan	Joydeb Chakraborty	Prasenjit, Ranjit Mallick		
Rasta	Bratyo Basu	Mithun Chakraborty, Rajatava Dutta	Crime Action Thriller	
Sabuj Saathi	Swapan Saha	Prasenjit, Tapas Paul	Romance Drama	
Sangee	Haranath Chakraborty	Jeet, Ranjit Mallick, Priyanka Trivedi	Romance Drama	
Santrash	Narayan Ray	Mithun Chakraborty, Ranjit Mallick	Action Thriller	
Sejo Bou	Anjan Choudhury	Ranjit Mallick, Tapas Paul	Family Drama	
Sharbari	Pareshnath Pal	Abhishek Chattopadhyay, Priya Karfa		
Shubho Mahurat	Rituparno Ghosh	Sharmila Tagore, Raakhee	Mystery	
Sneher Protidan	Swapan Saha	Jisshu Sengupta, Prasenjit	Family Drama	
Sukh Dukkher Sansar	Swapan Saha	Tapas Paul, Rituparna Sengupta		
Uddhar	Milan Bhowmik	Ranjit Mallick, Mrinal Mukherjee		

== 2004 ==
Title	Director	Cast	Genre	Notes
Aabar Asibo Phire	Rabi Ojha	Swaswata Chatterjee, Koninika Banerjee	Romance	
Abhishek	Shankar Ray	Tapas Paul, Rituparna Sengupta	Romance	
Adhikar	Khokon Chakraborty	Soumitra Chatterjee, Tapas Paul	Romance	
Agni	Swapan Saha	Prasenjit, Tapas Paul	Action, Drama	
Akritagno	Dilip Biswas	Firdous Ahmed, Ranjit Mallick	Romance	
Akrosh	Prashanta Nanda	Jeet, Rituparna Sengupta	Romance	
Ami Je Ke Tomar	Prabir Nandi	Soumitra Chatterjee, Tapas Paul	Romance	
Annaye Atyachar	Swapan Saha	Prasenjit, Jisshu Sengupta	Romance	
Anurag	Ratan Adhikari	Soumitra Chatterjee, Tapas Paul	Romance	
Atotayee	Satarupa Sanyal	Chiranjit, Tapas Paul	Romance	
Baba Keno Chakar	Swapan Saha	Prosenjit Chatterjee, Rituparna Sengupta, Abhishek Chatterjee	Drama	
Badsha the King	Shankar Ray	Prasenjit, Koel Mallick	Action	
Bandhan	Rabi Kinagi	Jeet, Koel Mallick	Romance	
Barood	T. L. V. Prasad	Mithun Chakraborty, Rajatava Dutta	Action	
Coolie	Swapan Saha	Mithun Chakraborty, Abhishek Chattopadhyay	Drama	
Dadu No. 1	Sanat Dutta	Firdous Ahmed, Ranjit Mallick	Romance	
Debdoot	T. L. V. Prasad	Mithun Chakraborty, Sreelekha Mitra	Romance	
Debipaksha	Raja Sen	Soumitra Chatterjee, Rituparna Sengupta	Romance	
Dwitio Paksha	Ananya Chatterjee	Santu Mukhopadhyay, Arindam Sil	Romance	
Ek Chilte Sindur	Hara Pattanayak	Hara Pattanayak, Rachana Banerjee	Romance	
Gyarakal	Haranath Chakraborty	Prasenjit, Jisshu Sengupta	Romance	
Hotath Neerar Jonnyo	Subrato Sen	Bikram Ghosh, Jaya Seal	Romance	
Iti Srikanta	Anjan Das	Rimi Sen, Soha Ali Khan	Period Drama	
Kalo Chita	Satarupa Sanyal	Rituparna Sengupta, Biswajit Chakraborty	Adventure Drama	
Kritodas	Debasis Chakraborty	Tapas Paul,	Romance	
Kuyasha	Milan Bhowmik	Ranjit Mallick, Soumitra Chatterjee	Romance	
Mahulbanir Sereng	Sekhar Das	Shilajeet, Chandrayi Ghosh	Drama	
Mamatar Bandhan	Himangshu Parija	Rituparna Sengupta, Laboni Sarkar	Romance	
Manasa Aamar Maa	Bijoy Bhashkar	Siddhanta Mohanti, Mihir Das	Romance	
Mastan	Rabi Kinagi	Jeet, Swastika Mukherjee	Drama	
Mayer Mon	Sanjoy Nayak	Siddhanta Mohanti, Aparajita Mohanti	Romance	
Mon Jake Chay	Ratan Adhikari	Firdous Ahmed, Rituparna Sengupta	Romance	
Paribar	Anup Sengupta	Prasenjit, Ranjit Mallick	Drama	
Prahar	Subhadra Chowdhury	Debashree Roy, Rajatava Dutta	Romance	
Premi	Rabi Kinagi	Jeet, Jisshu Sengupta	Romance	
Protisodh	Anup Sengupta	Prasenjit, Tapas Paul	Romance	
Raja Babu	Anup Sengupta	Mithun Chakraborty, Jisshu Sengupta	Romance	
Ram Laxman	Babu Ray	Prasenjit, Tota Ray Chowdhury	Romance	
Sagar Kinare	Sushanta Saha	Firdous Ahmed, Debashree Roy	Romance	
Sajani	Swapan Saha	Prasenjit, Jisshu Sengupta	Romance	
Samudra Sakshi	Dulal Dey	Jisshu Sengupta, Sabyasachi Chakraborty	Romance	
Sarisrip	Nabyendu Chatterjee	Kalyani Mondal, Sumitra Mukherjee	Romance	
Satabdir Galpo	Raj Mukherjee	Debashree Roy, Supriya Choudhury	Romance	
Shakti	P. Sambhashiv Rao	Jeet, Amitava Bhattacharya	Romance	
Shudhu Tumi	Abhijit Guha	Prasenjit, Koel Mallick	Action	
Sindurer Bandhan	Rajat Das	Ranjit Mallick, Tapas Paul	Romance	
Surya	Haranath Chakraborty	Prasenjit, Ranjit Mallick	Romance	
Swami Chhintai	Sohanur Rahaman Sohan	Rituparna Sengupta,	Romance	
Swapne Dekha Rajkanya	Narayan Ray	Mithun Chakraborty,	Romance	
Tin Ekke Tin	Malay Bhattacharya	Tapas Paul, Nilanjana Bhowmik	Romance	
Tista Parer Kanya	Panna Hossain	Sumitra Mukhopadhyay, Kalyan Chatterjee	Romance	
Tyaag	Swapan Saha	Prasenjit, Tapas Paul	Action Drama	
Waarish	Kaushik Ganguly	Debashree Roy, Sabyasachi Chakraborty	Drama	

== 2005 ==
Title	Director	Cast	Genre	Notes
Abiswasi	Kamal Ray	Ranjit Mallick, Tapas Paul	Romance	
Agnipath	Sujit Guha	Inder Kumar, Ranjit Mallick, Santu Mukhopadhyay, Biplab Chatterjee, Mrinal Mukherjee, Kaushik Banerjee, Laboni Sarkar	Drama	
Antarmahal	Rituparno Ghosh	Abhishek Bachchan, Jackie Shroff	Drama	
Arjun Rickshawala	Imraan Khalid	Mithun Chakraborty, Javed Khan	Action	
Babu Mashai	Akash	Abhishek Chattopadhyay, Lily Chakravarty	Romance	
Bazi	Shayma Prasad Mishra	Prosenjit Chatterjee, Rachana Banerjee, Saheb Chatterjee, Sudip Mukherjee, Uttam Mohanty, Anamika Saha, Subhasish Mukherjee	Drama	
Bazikar	Ashok Pati	Uttam Mohanti, Siddhanta Mahapatra	Romance	
Bichchu Chhele	Sajay Nayak	Hara Patnaik, Siddhanta Mahapatra	Romance	
Champa	Narayan Shill	Akashdeep Deka, Shyamontika Sharma, Nayan Nilim	Drama	Bilingual film
Chita	T. L. V. Prasad	Mithun Chakraborty, Rambha, Subhasish Mukherjee, Biplab Chatterjee, Sanjib Dasgupta, Bharat Kaul, Kaushik Banerjee	Action	
Chore Chore Mastuto Bhai	Anup Sengupta	Chiranjeet Chakraborty, Mithun Chakraborty, Jisshu Sengupta, Koel Mallick, Piya Sengupta, Deepankar De, Raja Chatterjee, Ramen Roy Chowdhury	Comedy Drama	
Criminal	Shankar Ray	Prosenjit Chatterjee, Rachana Banerjee, Rajesh Sharma, Ranjit Mallick, Locket Chatterjee, Bodhisattwa Majumdar	Romance	
Dada	T. L. V. Prasad	Mithun Chakraborty, Rambha, Sanjib Dasgupta, Bharat Kaul, Kaushik Banerjee, Mrityun Hazra, Biplab Chatterjee, Rajesh Sharma, Anamika Saha	Romance	
Dadar Adesh	Anup Sengupta	Prosenjit Chatterjee, Anu Chowdhury, Abhishek Chatterjee, Ranjit Mallick, Piya Sengupta, Priyanka Sarkar, Joy Badlani, Shankar Chakraborty, Rupanjana Mitra, Ramen Roy Chowdhury	Romance	
Debi	Swapan Saha	Jisshu Sengupta, Rachana Banerjee, Debashree Roy, Ramaprasad Banik, Kaushik Banerjee, Locket Chatterjee, Sanghamitra Bandopadhyay, Ramen Roy Chowdhury	Romance	
Devdoot	T. L. V. Prasad	Mithun Chakraborty, Sreelekha Mitra	Action	
Dwiragaman	Nandu Bhattacharya	Satabdi Roy, Dilip Ray	Romance	
Dwitio Basanta	Abhijit Dasgupta	Rituparna Sengupta, Sabyasachi Chakraborty	Romance	
Ek Mutho Chhabi	Anjan Dutt	Supriya Choudhury, Indrani Haldar	Compilation	
Har Jeet		Ferdous Ahmed, Rachana Banerjee	Romance	
Herbert	Suman Mukhopadhyay	Subhashish Mukhopadhyay, Lily Chakravarty	Action	
Krantikaal	Sekhar Das	Soumitra Chatterjee, Roopa Ganguly, Silajit Majumder	Drama	
Madhab Majhir Kalo Chushma	Sangita Bandopadhyay	Dolan Banerjee, Master Barun, Master Ritam	Children's	
Manik	Prabhat Roy	Jeet, Koel Mallick, Ranjit Mallick, Biplab Chatterjee, Rajesh Sharma, Rajatava Dutta, Shyamal Dutta, Samata Ghosh, Debdoot Ghosh	Drama	
Mantra	Rabiranjan Moitra	Soumitra Chatterjee, Swastika Mukherjee	Horror	
Mayer Raja	Milan Bhowmik	Jisshu Sengupta, Ranjit Mallick	Romance	
Nagardola	Raj Mukherjee	Deepankar De, Indrani Haldar	Romance	
Nishachar	Purnendu Halder	Satabdi Roy, Biplab Chattopadhyay	Romance	
Nishijapon	Sandip Ray	Soumitra Chatterjee, Rituparna Sengupta	Drama	
Nisshabd	Jahar Kanungo	Kaushik Chakravarty, Trina Nileena Banerjee, Sudeshna Basu,	Psychological comedy	
Parinam	Tanmoy Mukhopadhyay	Victor Banerjee, Sharad Kapoor, Nagma, Biplab Chatterjee	Romance	
Phire Pelam	Aamar Bhattacharya	Arpan Pal, Atanu Chakraborty	Romance	
Raat Barota Panch	Saran Dutta	Paran Bandyopadhyay, Ananya Chatterjee	Romance	
Rajmohol	Swapan Saha	Prosenjit Chatterjee, Abhishek Chattopadhyay, Anu Chowdhury, Rachana Banerjee, Biplab Chatterjee, Subhasish Mukherjee, Kalyani Mondal, Dulal Lahiri, Premjit	Romance	
Raju Uncle	Haranath Chakraborty	Prosenjit Chatterjee, Sayantani Ghosh, Ranjit Mallick, Arun Banerjee, Rajesh Sharma, Anamika Saha, Kanchan Mallick	Romance	
Sahar Jwolchhe	Sudhansu Sahu	Mithun Chakraborty, Hara Patnaik	Romance	
Sangram	Haranath Chakraborty	Prosenjit Chatterjee, Arunima Ghosh, Soumili Biswas, Jisshu Sengupta, Ranjit Mallick, Sabyasachi Chakraborty, Deepankar De, Arun Banerjee	Action, Drama	
Sathi Aamar	Shankar Ray	Prasenjit, Rachana Banerjee	Romance	
Shakal Sandhya	Swapan Saha	Prosenjit Chatterjee, Rachana Banerjee, Abhishek Chatterjee, Subhasish Mukherjee, Sanghamitra Bandopadhyay, Sumit Ganguly, Kanchan Mallick, Bodhisattwa Majumdar	Drama, Romance	
Shaktimaan	K. Ravi	Mithun Chakraborty, Rituparna Sengupta	Action	
Shatrur Santan	Shudhangshu Mohan Sen	Hara Pattanayak, Siddhanta	Romance	
Shubhodrishti	Prabhat Roy	Jeet, Koel Mallick	Romance	
Shudhu Bhalobasa	Raj Mukherjee	Jisshu Sengupta, Tapas Paul	Romance	
Shunyo E Buke	Kaushik Ganguly	Tota Ray Chowdhury, Churni Ganguly	Romance	
Swamir Deoya Sindur	Hara Pattanayak	Rachana Banerjee, Sadhana	Romance	
Swapna	Haranath Chakraborty	Jisshu Sengupta, Prasenjit	Romance	
Til Theke Tal	Debasish Bhuniya	Tapas Paul, Lily Chakravarty	Romance	
Tista	Bratyo Basu	Debashree Roy, Lily Chakraborty	Romance	
Tobu Bhalobasi	Biresh Chattopadhyay	Prasenjit, Ranjit Mallick	Romance	
Yuddho	Rabi Kinagi	Mithun Chakraborty, Jeet, Debashree Roy, Koel Mullick	Action	

== 2006 ==
Title	Director	Cast	Genre	Notes
Aamra	Maynak Bhowmik	Jisshu Sengupta, Parambrata Chatterjee	Romance	
Abhimanyu	Swapan Saha	Jisshu Sengupta, Mithun Chakraborty	Action	
Abhinetri	Satabdi Roy	Chiranjit, Tapas Paul	Romance	
Agnibalaka	Panna Hossain	Arun Mukherjee, Mrinal Mukherjee	Romance	
Agnipariksha	Rabi Kinagi	Prosenjit Chatterjee, Priyanka Trivedi, Abdur Razzak, Kaushik Banerjee, Paoli Dam, Premjit	Romance	
Agnishapath	Prabir Nandi	Deepankar De, Rachana Banerjee, Sabyasachi Chakraborty, Dev	Action	
Akai Aaksho	Babu Ray	Prosenjit Chatterjee, Rachana Banerjee		
Arjun	Hara Pattanayak	Hara Pattanayak, Rameshwari	Romance	
Asha	Shib Prasad Chakraborty	Soumitra Chatterjee, Debraj Ray	Romance	
Bhalobasar Onek Naam	Tarun Majumdar	Soumitra Chatterjee, Tapas Paul	Romance	
Bhumiputra	Raj Mukherjee	Jisshu Sengupta, Tapas Paul	Romance	
Bibar	Subrato Sen	Sabyasachi Chakraborty, Biswajit Chakraborty	Drama	
Byatikromi	Ashok Biswanathan	Rituparna Sengupta, Ashok Biswanathan	Romance	
Dosar	Rituparno Ghosh	Prasenjit, Chandreye Ghosh	Romance	
Ekai Eksho	Babu Ray	Prasenjit, Deepankar De	Romance	
Eri Naam Prem	Sujit Guha	Koel Mallick, Anubhav Mohanty, Mrinal Mukherjee, Subhasish Mukherjee	Romance	
Faltu	Anjan Das	Indrani Haldar, Biplab Chatterjee	Drama	
Ganyer Meye Shahure Bou	Chittaranjan Das	Tapas Paul, Rituparna Sengupta	Romance	
Ghatak	Swapan Saha	Jeet, Koel Mallick, Rajatava Dutta, Tapas Paul, Anamika Saha, Shankar Chakraborty	Romance	
Hero	Swapan Saha	Jeet, Koel Mallick, Abdur Razzak, Tapas Paul	Action Comedy	
Hungama	Swapan Saha	Jisshu Sengupta, Mithun Chakraborty	Romance	
Je Jon Thake Majhkhane	Sushanta Mukherjee	Debashree Roy, Madhabi Mukherjee	Romance	
Kabuliwala	Kazi Hayat	Manna, Prarthana Fardin Dighi	Drama	
Kantatar	Bappaditya Banerjee	Rudranil Ghosh, Sreelekha Mitra	Romance	
Khalnayak	Ratan Adhikari	Anubhav Mohanty, Rachana Banerjee, Tapas Paul, Rajatava Dutta, Locket Chatterjee, Mrinal Mukherjee, Subhasish Mukherjee	Romance	
Kranti	Riingo Banerjee	Jeet, Swastika Mukherjee, Ashish Vidyarthi, Rishi Kaushik, Rajesh Sharma, Biswanath Basu	Action Drama	
MLA Fatakeshto	Swapan Saha	Mithun Chakraborty, Koel Mallick, Debashree Roy, Rajatava Dutta, Bharat Kaul, Shantilal Mukherjee, Sanjib Dasgupta, Soumitra Chatterjee	Political Drama	
Mahasangram	Kumarjit Patitundu	Rituparna Sengupta, Supriya Choudhury	Drama	
Manush Bhut	Ajoy Sarkar	Debashree Roy, Sabyasachi Chakraborty	Romance	
Nayak	Sujit Guha	Prosenjit Chatterjee, Swastika Mukherjee, Sayantani Ghosh, Ashish Vidyarthi, Abdur Razzak, Rajatava Dutta, Mrinal Mukherjee, Anamika Saha, Subhasish Mukherjee	Romance	
Pita	Swapan Ghosal	Jisshu Sengupta, Alok Nath	Drama	
Podokkhep	Suman Ghosh	Soumitra Chatterjee, Nandita Das	Romance	
Praner Swami	A. K. Sohel	Firdous Ahmed, Rachana Banerjee	Romance	
Priyotama	Prabhat Roy	Jeet, Swastika Mukherjee	Romance	
Rabibarer Bikalbela	Amit Dutta	Arun Mukherjee, Gita Dey	Romance	
Ranangan	Sushanta Saha	Rituparna Sengupta,	Romance	
Refugee	Haranath Chakraborty	Prosenjit Chatterjee, Rambha, Rajesh Sharma, Rudranil Ghosh, Kalyani Mondal, Chandan Sen	Action	
Sakal Sandhya	Swapan Saha	Prosenjit Chatterjee, Rachana Banerjee, Abhishek Chatterjee, Subhasish Mukherjee, Sumit Ganguly, Kanchan Mallick, Sanghamitra Bandopadhyay	Romance	
Samayer Chhayaguli	Florian Galenbarger	Soumitra Chatterjee, Irrfan Khan	Romance	
Sat Maa	Mohd. Mohsin	Rachana Banerjee, Uttam Mohanti	Romance	
Sathihara	Biresh Chattopadhyay	Jeet, Swastika Mukherjee, Debjani Ghosh, Dulal Lahiri, Tapas Paul, Meghna Halder	Romance	
Satyer Jay	Hara Pattanayak	Rachana Banerjee, Hara Pattanayak	Romance	
Shikar	Saran Dutta	Tapas Paul, June Malia	Action	
Swapno	Prosenjit Chatterjee, Jisshu Sengupta	Sayantani Ghosh, Haranath Chakraborty, others	Drama, Romance	
Swarthopar	Swapan Saha	Jisshu Sengupta, Rachana Banerjee	Romance	
Tapasya	Raj Mukherjee	Jisshu Sengupta, Rituparna Sengupta	Romance	
Teen Yaari Katha	Sudeshna Roy, Abhijit Guha	Neel Mukherjee, Rudranil Ghosh, Parambrata Chatterjee	Drama, Comedy	
Tekka	Tutul Banerjee	Nimu Bhowmik, Shambhu Bhattacharya	Romance	
The Bong Connection	Anjan Dutt	Raima Sen, Shayan Munshi	Romance	
Tobu Aste Habe Phire	C. Koushik	Madhabi Mukherjee, Soma Dey	Romance	
Uttarayan	Lekh Tandon	Victor Banerjee, Shabana Azmi	Romance	
X..	Sanjibon Nath	Anup Sarkar, Bindu Chowdhury	Romance	

== 2007 ==
Title	Director	Cast	Genre	Notes
Aloy Phera	Subhash Sen	Tapas Paul, Rituparna Sengupta	Romance	
Anuranan	Aniruddha Raychowdhury	Rituparna Sengupta	Drama	
Ballygunge Court	Pinaki Chowdhury	Soumitra Chatterjee, Sabyasachi Chakraborty	Romance	
Bandhu	Prashanta Nanda	Ashok Kumar-II, Prasenjit	Drama	
Banobhumi	Swapan Ghosal	Santu Mukhopadhyay, Indrani Haldar	Romance	
Barodir Bramhachari Baba Lokenath	Koushik Acharya	Biswajit Chakraborty, Debraj Ray	Romance	
Bhalobasar Dibbi	Milan Bhowmik	Biplab Chattopadhyay, Mrinal Mukherjee	Romance	
Bidhatar Lekha	Raja Mukherjee	Jeet, Sabyasachi Chakraborty	Romance	
Chakra	Sanghamitra Chowdhury	Jisshu Sengupta, Rajatava Dutta	Romance	
Chander Bari	Tarun Majumdar	Ranjit Mallick, Soumitra Chatterjee	Drama	
Dus Din Pore	Naren Banerjee	Debashree Roy, Rajesh Sharma, Shantilal Mukherjeee	Thriller	
Greptar	Swapan Saha	Prasenjit, Tapas Paul	Romance	
I Love You	Rabi Kinagi	Tapas Paul, Rajatava Dutta, Dev, Payel	Romance	
Jara Bristite Bhijechhilo	Anjan Das	Soumitra Chatterjee, Indrani Haldar	Drama	
Jay Jagannath	Sabyasachi Mahapatra	Madhubala, Akash Mon Ray	Romance	
Jiban Sathi	Shankar Ray	Swastika Mukherjee, Deepankar Dey	Romance	
Kaal	Bappaditya Bandyopadhyay	Rudranil Ghosh, Chandreye Ghosh	Drama	
Kailashey Kelenkari	Sandip Ray	Deepankar Dey, Parambrato Chattopadhyay	Action	
Kaka No.1	Sanat Dutta	Ranjit Mallick, Rituparna Sengupta	Romance	
Kalishankar	Prashanta Nanda	Jisshu Sengupta, Prasenjit	Action	
Katha	Shankha Ghosh	Gita Dey, Archana Bandyopadhyay	Romance	
Krishnakanter Will	Raja Sen	Jeet, Soumitra Chatterjee	Romance	
Lal Pahare'r Katha	Remo D'Souza	Mithun Chakraborty, Rishi	Drama	
Mahaguru	Anup Sengupta	Mithun Chakraborty, Jisshu Sengupta	Action	
Matir Moyna	Tarak Masud	Jayanta Chatterjee, Narul Islam Bablu	War Drama	
Mayer Mukti	Rupak Das	Hara Pattanayak, Siddhanta	Romance	
Meghla Mon	Panna Hossain	Arif Hossain, Sabina Saiyad	Romance	
Minister Fatakeshto	Swapan Saha	Mithun Chakraborty, Soumitra Chatterjee	Action	
Nabab Nandini	Haranath Chakraborty	Ranjit Mallick, Koyel Mullick	Romance	
Narir Samman	Arun Mohanti	Rachana Banerjee, Hara Pattanayak	Romance	
Niswabda	Jahar Kanungo	Koushik Bandyopadhyay, Payel	Romance	
Noy Number Bipod Sanket	Humayun Ahmed	Rahmat Ali, Challenger	Drama	
Padakhep	Suman Ghosh	Soumitra Chatterjee, Tota Ray Chowdhury	Romance	
Pagal Premi	Hara Patnaik	Ritwick Chakraborty, Yash Dasgupta, Arpita Mukherjee	Romance	
Pitri Bhumi	Prabhat Roy	Jeet, Swastika Mukherjee	Romance	
Pratham Prem	Shyam Pradhan	Ranjana, Ganesh Upretier	Romance	
Prem	Tapan Banerjee	Rajatava Dutta, Kharaj Mukhopadhyay	Romance	
Prem Rog	Partha Sarathi Jowardar	Mrinal Mukherjee, Kalyan Chattopadhyay	Romance	
Pritthi	Sisir Sahana	Baby Rimi Dutta, Jogen Chowdhury	Romance	
Probhu Nosto Hoi Jai	Agnidev Chatterjee	Kunal Mitra, Arunima Ghosh	Drama	
Raat Porir Rupkatha	Sanghamitra Chowdhury	Jackie Shroff, Indrani Haldar	Romance	
Ratbhor	Raj Mukherjee	Indrani Haldar, Roopa Ganguly	Romance	
Rudra The Fire	Manas Basu	Jisshu Sengupta, Swastika Mukherjee	Romance	
Sangharsha	Sujit Guha	Prasenjit, Swastika Mukherjee	Romance	
Sanghat	Mohd. Mohsin	Rachana Banerjee, Uttam Mohanti	Romance	
Sangshoy	Saibal Mitra	Rituparna Sengupta, Debesh Raychowdhury	Romance	
Shapmochon	Hira Chowdhury	Jisshu Sengupta, Hara Pattanayak	Romance	
Shudhu Tomar Jonyo	Surya Saha	Dipankar De, Amitava Bhattacharya	Romance	
Sri Ramkrishna Vivekananda	Jogesh K. Mehta	Biswajit Chakraborty, Debraj Ray	Romance	
Tiger	Swapan Saha	Mithun Chakraborty, Debashree Roy	Action	
Tulkalam	Haranath Chakraborty	Mithun Chakraborty, Rajatava Dutta	Action	

== 2008 ==
Title	Director	Cast	Genre	Notes
10:10	Arin Paul	Soumitra Chatterjee, Subrata Dutta Aparajita Ghosh Das Claudia Ciesla Kanchan Mallik	Comedy	
90 Ghanta	Saugata Roy Barman	Jisshu Sengupta, Swastika Mukherjee Tota Roy Chowdhury	Thriller	
Aainate	Dulal Dey	Firdous Ahmed, Rituparna Sengupta Rati Agnihotri	Drama	
Aamar Pratigya	Swapan Saha	Priyanshu Chatterjee, Priyanka Trivedi	Romance	
Abelay Garam Bhat	Subhendu Ghosh	Abhishek Chatterjee, Pamela, Dolon Roy	Romance, comedy	
Ami, Yasin Ar Amar Madhubala	Buddhadeb Dasgupta	Prasenjit, Sameera Reddy	Drama	
Antaratama	Soumya Supriyo	Chiranjit, Sreelekha Mitra	Drama	
Bajimaat	Haranath Chakraborty	Soham Chakraborty, Subhashree Ganguly	Drama	
Bhagya Chakra	Basanta Sau	Anubhav Mohanty, Anu Chowdhury	Romance	
Bhalobasa Bhalobasa	Rabi Kinagi	Hiran Chatterjee, Srabanti Malakar	Romance	
Biyer Lagna	F. I. Manik	Tapas Paul, Ferdous Ahmed	Romance	
Blood	Ansuya Samanta	Debesh Raychowdhury	Drama	
Bor Asbe Ekhuni	Rangan Chakraborty	Jisshu Sengupta, Koel Mallick	Romance/comedy	
Chae Mon Tomake	N. Padi	Rishi Roy, Varsha Priyadarshini, Kajal Dushmanta	Action	
Chalo Let's Go	Anjan Dutt	Parambrata Chatterjee, Rudranil Ghosh	Drama	
Chaturanga	Suman Mukherjee		Drama	
Chirodini Tumi Je Amar	Raj Chakraborty	Rahul Banerjee, Priyanka Sarkar, Aritra Dutta Banik	Action/romance/comedy	
Chirosathi	Haranath Chakraborty	Hiran Chatterjee, Koyel Mullick	Action/Romance/comedy	
Eti	Sambit Nag	Gourab Chatterjee, Roopali Ganguly	Romance	
Gharjamai	Anup Sengupta	Prasenjit, Namrata Thapa	Romance	
Golmaal	Swapan Saha	Prasenjit, Jisshu Sengupta, Tota Roy Chowdhury, Barsa Priyadarshini, Namrata Thapa, Priyanka Trivedi	Comedy	
Hello Kolkata	Manoj Michigan	Sudip Mukherjee, Sreelekha Mitra	Romance	
Hochheta Ki	Basu Chatterjee	Prasenjit, Arunima Ghosh	Comedy	
Janatar Aadalat	Manoj Thakur	Jisshu Sengupta, Indrani Dutta	Romance	
Janmadata	Swapan Saha	Jisshu Sengupta, Rachana Banerjee	Romance	
Jor	Swapan Saha	Jeet, Barsa Priyadarshini	Romance	
Kaalpurush	Buddhadeb Dasgupta	Mithun Chakraborty, Rahul Bose	Drama	
Ke Tumi	Prasun Bandyopadhyay	Biswajit, Rituparna Sengupta	Drama	
Khela	Rituparno Ghosh	Prasenjit, Manisha Koirala	Drama	
Lal Ronger Duniya	Nilanjan Bhattacharya	Debashree Roy, Locket Chatterjee	Drama	
Love	Riingo Banerjee	Jisshu Sengupta, Koyel Mullick	Romance/comedy	
Love Story	Raj Mukherjee	Angsuman Parashar, Barsha Priyadarshini	Romance	
Mahakaal	Swapan Ghosal	Prosenjit, Indira Dhar	Action	
Mon Amour: Shesher Kobita Revisited	Shubhrajit Mitra	Rituparna Sengupta, Saheb Chatterjee Tota Roy Chowdhury	Romance	
Mon Mane Na	Sujit Guha	Dev, Koel Mallick	Romance	
Mr. Funtoosh	Raj Mukherjee	Prasenjit, Rachana Banerjee	Drama	
Neel Rajar Deshe	Riingo Banerjee	Indrani Haldar, Ashish Vidyarthi, Devdaan Bhowmik, Tathoi Deb	Drama	
Partner	Shankar Ray	Jeet, Swastika Mukherjee	Romance	
Phera	Partha Sarathi Jowardar	Tapas Paul, Rituparna Sengupta	Romance	
Premer Kahini	Ravi Kinagi	Koyel Mullick, Dev	Action/romance/comedy	
Rajkumar	Swapan Saha	Prasenjit, Anu Chowdhury	Romance	
Raktamukhi Neela	Debraj Sinha	Sabyasachi Chakrabarty, June Maliya	Drama	
Rangamati	Kanoj Das	Amitabh Bhattacharjee, Sreela Majumdar	Drama	
Sabdhan Pancha Aashche	Arin Paul	Rudranil Ghosh, Subrata Dutta	Comedy	Incomplete
Sadhu Babar Lathi	Sanghita Banerjee	Ramaprasad Banik	Drama	
Satyameba Jayate	Milan Bhowmik	Mithun Chakraborty, Puneet Issar	Drama	
Sedin Dujone	Atanu Basu	Amitabh Bhattacharjee, Kasturi	Romance	
Shibaji	Babu Ray	Prasenjit, Swastika Mukherjee	Action	
Swapner Din	Buddhadeb Dasgupta	Prasenjit, Rimi Sen	Romance	
Takkar	Swapan Saha	Prasenjit, Arindam	Drama	
Tintorettor Jishu	Sandip Ray	Sabyasachi Chakrabarty, Parambrata Chatterjee	Mystery	
Tolly Lights	Arjun Chakraborty	Abhishek Chatterjee, Sreelekha Mitra	Romance	
Tollywood Focus	Manas Bose	Amitabh Bhattacharjee, Swastika Mukherjee	Drama	
Tomar Jonyo	Nilanjan Banerjee	Rishi Roy, Shreya	Romance	
Tumi Kar	Gobinda Chandra Haldar	Arjun Chakraborty, Rimjhim Gupta, Amitava Bhattacharya	Romance	

== 2009 ==
Title	Director	Cast	Genre	Notes
Abar Brishti Elo	Parthosarathi Joardar	Saheb Chatterjee, Priya Karfa	Romance	
Angshumaner Chhobi	Atanu Ghosh	Soumitra Chatterjee, Indrani Halder	Psychological drama	
Antaheen...	Aniruddha Raychowdhury	Sharmila Tagore, Aparna Sen	Romance	
Aparadhi	Subhash Sen	Prosenjit Chatterjee, Priyanka Trivedi	Drama	
Bhroon	Shankha Bandyopadhyay	Swastika Mukherjee, Arunima Ghosh	Romance	
Brake Fail	Kaushik Ganguly	Parambrata Chattopadhyay, Swastika Mukherjee		
Bangal Ghoti Phataphati	Prabir Nandi	Jisshu Sengupta, Koel Mallick	Romance	
Chha-e Chhuti	Aniket Chattopadhaya	Sabyasachi Chakrabarty, Kunal Mitra	Comedy	
Challenge	Raj Chakraborty	Dev, Subhashree Ganguly	Romance, Comedy	
Chaowa Pawa	Swapan Saha	Prosenjit, Rachana Banerjee	Romance	
Chhuti	Manoj Sen	Jnanesh Mukherjee, Mamata Shankar	Romance	
Chora Bali	Partha Sarathi Jowardar	Sabyasachi Chakrabarty, Rudranil Ghosh	Romance	
Cross Connection	Abhijit Guha and Sudeshna Roy	Saswata Chatterjee, Rimjhim Mitra	Romance	
Dujone	Rajib Biswas	Dev, Srabanti Chatterjee	Romance	
Durga	Sanjay Dhabade	Anjana Basu, Rudranil Ghosh	Romance	
Dwando	Suman Ghosh	Soumitra Chatterjee, Ananya Chatterjee	Drama	
Ek Bar Bolo Uttam Kumar	Chinmoy Roy	Parambrata Chatterjee, Mumtaz Sorcar	Romance	Incomplete
Eka Eka	Tapas Majumdar	Amitabh Bhattacharjee, Anjana Basu	Romance	
Friend	Satabdi Roy			
Hanshi Khushi Club	Shankha Bandopadhyay	Jeet, Barsha Priyadarshini, Biswajit Chakraborty	Comedy	
Hit List	Sandip Ray	Koel Mallick, Saheb Chatterjee, Dhritiman Chatterjee	Thriller	
Houseful	Bappaditya Bandyopadhyay	Prosenjit Chatterjee, Rachna Shah, Rimjhim Gupta, Rwita Dutta Chakrabarti		
Jackpot	Kaushik Ganguly	Hiran Chatterjee, Koyel Mullick, Rahul Banerjee, Sohini Paul		
Jakhan Esechhilem	Sukanta Roy	Soumitra Chatterjee, Debashree Roy	Romance	
Jamai Raja	Swapan Saha	Prosenjit Chatterjee, Pouli Dam, Anu Mallick		
Jekhane Ashray	Amitabha Mitra	Debraj Ray, Mahua Roychoudhury		
Jodi Kagoje Lekho Naam	Shibprasad Chakraborty	Aakash, Ratri Goswami, Soumitra Chatterjee	Romance, Drama	
Juari				
Kaalbela	Goutam Ghose	Parambrata Chatterjee, Paoli Dam	Drama	
Lakshyabhed	Raj Mukherjee	Swastika Mukherjee, Rachana Banerjee	Romance	
Madly Bangalee	Anjan Dutt	Soumyak Kanti DeBiswas, Anubrata Basu	Drama	
Magno Mainak	Swapan Ghosal		Crime Drama	
Mama Bhagne	Anup Sengupta	Prosenjit Chatterjee, Ananya Chatterjee		
Maner Ajante	Prasun Banerjee	Sanju, Dolan, Bodhisatwa Majumdar	Action	
Megh Brishtir Khela	Partha Sarathi Jowardar	Saheb Chatterjee, Rituparna Sengupta	Romance	
Neel Akasher Chandni	Sujit Guha	Jeetendra Madnani, Jisshu Sengupta	Romance, Comedy	
Olot Palot	Swapan Saha	Hiran Chatterjee, Rajatava Dutta	Comedy	
Pakhi	Gautam Sen	Soumitra Chatterjee, Debashree Roy	Romance	
Paran Jai Jaliya Re	Ravi Kinnagi	Dev, Subhashree Ganguly	Romance	
Prem Aamar	Raj Chakraborty	Soham Chakraborty, Payel Sarkar	Drama	
Prem Bandhan	Biswanath Chakraborty	Pratik Sen, Koel Banerjee, Dulal Lahiri	Action	
Premi No.1	Debu Pattnaik	Anubhav Mohanty, Koyel Mullick	Romance	
Rajdrohi	Tapan Banerjee	Angshuman Gupta, Swati	Science Fiction	
Room Number 28	Masum Raza, Kaddus Miah	Sahel Kamal, Anwarul Haque, Fazlul Alam Rubel, Selina Shelly, Ramzan Miah	Thriller	
Saat Paake Bandha	Sujit Mondol	Jeet, Koyel Mullick	Romance	
Sakaler Rang	Suvamoy Chattopdhyay	Churni Ganguly, Monu Mukhopadhyay		
Samapti	Bijoy Bose	Tapas Paul, Debashree Roy, Madhabi Mukherjee	Romance, Drama	
Smritimedur	Sunit Bhattacharya	Indrajit Chakraborty, Sreelekha Mitra	Romance	
Shob Charitro Kalponik	Rituparno Ghosh	Prasenjit, Bipasha Basu	Romance	
Teen Murti	Raja Sen	Paoli Dam, Joy Mukherjee, Ranjit Mallick	Romance, Drama	
Trishna	Pritam Jalan	Rituparna Sengupta, Angshuman Gupta	Romance	
