= Jamaibabu Jindabad =

2001 film by Ratan Adhikari

- Theatrical release poster
- Directed by: Ratan Adhikari
- Produced by: Surinder Singh
- Starring: See below
- Music by: Babul Bose
- Production company: Surinder Films
- Distributed by: Eagle Video
- Release date: 2001
- Country: India
- Language: Bengali

Jamaibabu Jindabad (transl. long life brother-in-law) is a 2001 Bengali-language masala film directed by Ratan Adhikari and produced by Surinder Singh under his Surinder Film banner. The film features actors Prosenjit Chatterjee and Rituparna Sengupta in the lead roles. Music for the film was composed by Babul Bose. The movie is a remake of 1986 Kannada hit movie Anuraga Aralithu.

== Cast ==
- Prosenjit Chatterjee as Sagar Mukherjee, Chief Mechanic at Chowdhury Industries
- Rituparna Sengupta as Kajol Chowdhury, Owner of Chowdhury Industries
- Deepankar Dey as Shubhomoy Chowdhury, Kajol's father
- Laboni Sarkar as Sagar's mother
- Shankar Chakraborty
- Subhendu Chatterjee
- Biplab Chatterjee as Mr. Ghosh
- Anuradha Ray as Kajol's mother
- Kaushik Banerjee as M.K. Dutta, Manager at Chowdhury Industries
- Ramaprasad Banik
- Saheli Mukhopadhyay as Priya, Receptionist at Chowdhury Industries

== Soundtrack ==
Track listing
| No. | Title | Singer(s) | Length |
|---|---|---|---|
| 1. | "Title Track" | Babul Supriyo, Priya Bhattacharya | 6:00 |
| 2. | "Tapur Tupur Brishtite" | Shaan, Sadhana Sargam | 5:23 |
| 3. | "Oh Amar Sona Mona" | Anupama Deshpande | 4:43 |
| 4. | "Sneher Chayay Bhalobasay" | Babul Supriyo, Priya Bhattacharya | 5:13 |
| 5. | "Jago Mahadeb" | Sadhana Sargam | 4:10 |
| 6. | "Seito Tomar Kache Elam Phire" | Udit Narayan, Anuradha Paudwal | 5:26 |
