= Shubha Kamana =

1991 film

- Directed by: Anup Sengupta
- Produced by: Rajib Das; Saibal Mitra
- Starring: Tapas Paul; Debashree Roy; Madhabi Mukherjee; Anil Chatterjee; Deepankar De; Madhabi Mukherjee
- Music by: Ajoy Das
- Release date: 1991
- Country: India
- Language: Bengali

Shubha Kamana is a 1991 Bengali film directed by Anup Sengupta. This film was produced by Rajib Das and Saibal Mitra.

== Cast ==
- Rabi Ghosh
- Tapas Paul
- Debashree Roy
- Gita Dey
- Madhabi Mukherjee
- Anil Chatterjee
- Deepankar De
- Utpal Dutta
- Rajeshwari Raychoudhury
- Piya Das

== Music ==
This film has been music composed by Ajoy Das.
