= Banglar Badhu =

1998 film

- Directed by: Anup Sengupta
- Starring: Tapas Paul; Rozina; Nayna Bandyopadhyay; Abhishek Chatterjee; Biplab Chatterjee; Sabitri Chatterjee; Subhendu Chatterjee; Gita Dey; Lokesh Ghosh
- Music by: Anupam Dutta
- Production company: Sri Baidyanath Films
- Release date: 1998
- Country: India
- Language: Bengali

Banglar Badhu (transl. bride of Bengal) is a 1998 Bengali drama film directed by Anup Sengupta. The plot revolves around Raja Chowdhury, a wealthy landlord and his beautiful wife Mala who are subject to a vicious intrigue by his brother-in-law Gokul. It stars Tapas Paul, Rozina, Nayna Bandyopadhyay, Sabitri Chatterjee, Subhendu Chatterjee, Abhishek Chatterjee, Biplab Chatterjee and Gita Dey. The music of the film is composed by Anupam Dutta.

== Cast ==
- Tapas Paul as Raja Chowdhury/ Bipin Chowdhury, Raja's father
- Rozina as Mala
- Sabitri Chatterjee as Sudha Chowdhury, Raja's Mother
- Subhendu Chatterjee as Jagadish, Mala's father
- Abhishek Chatterjee as Ratan
- Nayna Bandyopadhyay as Purnima aka Ratna
- Gita Dey as Jagadish's mother
- Piya Sengupta as Sumita, Raja's younger sister
- Anamika Saha as Piyali, Raja's elder sister
- Biplab Chatterjee as Gokul Majumdar, Piyali's husband
- Lokesh Ghosh as Dipak Mitra
- Subrata Chatterjee as Dipak's mother

== Music ==
1. "Jole Jole Nibhe Jabe" - Shakila Zafar
2. "O Rongila Bandhure" - Sabina Yasmin, Andrew Kishore, Music by-Ahmed Imtiaz Bulbul, Anupam Dutta
