= Mahaguru (2007 film) =

2007 Indian action thriller film

- DVD Cover
- Directed by: Anup Sengupta
- Screenplay by: N.K. Salil; Mithun Chakraborty; Amal Chatterjee
- Story by: N. K. Salil
- Produced by: Anup Sengupta; Nimai Panja; Piya Sengupta
- Starring: Mithun Chakraborty; Jisshu Sengupta; Debashree Roy; Anu Choudhury
- Music by: Ashok Bhadra
- Release date: 27 July 2007
- Running time: 138 minutes
- Country: India
- Language: Bengali
- Budget: Rs 1 Crore

Mahaguru (Bengali: মহাগুরু) is a 2007 Indian Bengali-language action thriller film directed by Anup Sengupta, starring Mithun Chakraborty, Debashree Roy, Jisshu Sengupta, George Baker and Anu Choudhury.

== Cast ==
- Mithun Chakraborty as Inspector Rudra Sen/Guru (Dual role)
- Debashree Roy as Indrani Sen, Rudra's wife
- Jisshu Sengupta as Bishu, Shiv Kumar Naskar
- Anu Choudhury as Manoshi Sen, Rudra's sister
- Piya Sengupta as Guru's love interest
- George Baker as Pandit Ajay Sinha, Arms and RDX smuggler
- Shyamal Dutta as Central Minister
- Joy Badlani as Inspector Bijay Sarkar
- Dulal Lahiri as DIG Somnath Sen, Rudra's father
- Subhasish Mukhopadhyay as Khabrilal, an Informer
- Ramen Roy Chowdhury as Police Commissioner
- Shankar Chakraborty as Munna, Panditji's henchman
- Anamika Saha as Guru's mother
- Anuradha Ray as Mita Roy, Amit Roy's wife.
- Debraj Roy as Amit Roy, a scientist.

== Music ==
The album is composed by Ashok Bhadra, while lyrics are penned by Goutam Susmit.

#	Title	Singer(s)	Length
1	"Bhalobasi Bhalobasi - 1"	Priya Bhattacharya	04:11
2	"Bhalobasi Bhalobasi - 2"	Miss Jojo	04:06
3	"Kholre Botol Aajke"	Kumar Sanu, Priya Bhattacharya	05:32
4	"Ogo Saathi Aamar"	Kumar Sanu, Sadhana Sargam	05:37
7	"Bina Tole Sur"	Aritra Sarkar	05.24

== Box office ==
The film had a seven-week run in Calcutta, and earned a profit of over rupees 25 lakhs against a budget of rupees 1 crore.
