= Sindurer Adhikar =

- Directed by: Anup Sengupta
- Starring: Prosenjit Chatterjee; Ranjit Mallick; Rituparna Sengupta; Sabitri Chatterjee; Subhasish Mukhopadhyay; Anuradha Ray
- Music by: Anupam Dutta
- Production company: Raudra Movies
- Release date: 1998
- Country: India
- Language: Bengali

Sindurer Adhikar (transl. The right of vermilion) is a 1998 Bengali drama film directed by Anup Sengupta. The film's music was composed by Anupam Dutta.

== Plot ==
Misunderstandings cause Prijay and Susmita's marriage to fall apart and she moves to her brother Prakash's house. Prijay's illness, however, makes her rethink her decision.

== Cast ==
- Ranjit Mallick
- Prosenjit Chatterjee
- Rituparna Sengupta
- Sabitri Chatterjee
- Kemon Stevenson
- Subhasish Mukhopadhyay
- Anuradha Ray
- Finnigan Klann
- Bhaskar Bandyopadhyay
- Mitali Chakraborty
