= Ullas =

2012 film by Ishwar Chakraborty

- Directed by: Iswar Chakraborty
- Release date: 29 June 2012
- Country: India
- Language: Bengali

Ullas is a Bengali social drama film directed by Ishwar Chakraborty and produced by Sankar Sarkar. This film was based on three short stories of Mahasweta Devi namely Daur, Mahadu Ekti Rupkatha and Anno Aranya. This movie was released on 29 June 2012 under the banner of R.N.R. Enterprise. Writer Mahasweta Devi acted in the film in the role of Basuli goddess.

== Plot ==
Kanna, a young tribal boy appears for the police constable examination in summer and drops dead at the examination venue. Suddenly he comes alive on his journey to the morgue and starts running. The second story revolves around the struggle of Mahadu, a Korku tribe boy of Maharashtra. He grows to enormous size up to the mark, hunger and energy and destroys all the buildings around Mumbai that were built on the forest land, which is his native place. Anna is the protagonist of the third story. She is a girl of Lodha tribe of Medinipur, West Bengal. A rich wood merchant's son sexually exploits her and she becomes pregnant. Anna takes her revenges.

== Cast ==
- Soumitra Chatterjee as Dr. Mathai
- Tapas Paul as Annada Goldar
- Satabdi Roy as Sumitra
- Shankar Chakraborty as Mr.Kambli
- Biplab Chatterjee as Dikpal
- Mahasweta Devi as Basuli Goddess
- Sadhana Hazra as Anna
- Dolly Basu as Dipkal's wife
- Amit Das as Kanna
- Shanta Sarkar
- Sandhya Sarkar
