= Gharjamai (film) =

Ghar jamai
- Directed by: Anup Sengupta
- Produced by: Anjan Sarkar, Anup Sengupta
- Starring: Prasenjit Chatterjee; Namrata Thapa; Piya Sengupta; Abhishek Chatterjee
- Edited by: Atish De Sarkar
- Music by: Subhayu
- Release date: 11 July 2008
- Country: India
- Language: Bengali

Gharjamai (Bengali: ঘর জামাই "live-in son-in- law") is a 2008 action Bengali film directed by Anup Sengupta. It stars Prasenjit Chatterjee, Namrata Thapa, Piya Sengupta and Abhishek Chatterjee in the lead roles. This Anup Sengupta film is sometimes confused with the Hindi film Jamai Raja starring Anil Kapoor, Hema Malini and Madhuri Dixit. The title Gharjamai refers to a man who is financially dependent on his wife's family, which carries a social stigma in cultures of the Indian subcontinent.

== Plot ==
Amar Banerjee has two wives who live in separate places. Mahim Ghoshal is Amar's conspiring manager. Amar's first wife Mamata feels insecure about Amar's second wife Sabitri, and Mahim takes advantage of the situation. Mahim advises Mamata to pay him to kill Sabitri. Mahim sends a killer who brutally knives Sabitri to death. In the heat of the moment the killer shoots and kills Sabitri's friend too. Sabitri's son Debnath and his best friend Shibnath manage to escape from the hired assassin with Shibnath's sister, Rani. After the children are separated. Debnath becomes Deba Mastan while Shibnath becomes Shiba. Rani becomes a torger and finds a sidekick within Pangla. Shibnath is raised by Amar Banerjee's driver Sanatan, an honest man. After Amar Banerjee's death Mahim Ghoshal carries out a plan to obtain the Banerjee property. He blackmails Mamata and coerces her to allow her daughter Tina to be married with Mahim's insane son Rocket. But Shibnath arrives at a crucial moment to save Tina from getting married with the hoodlum. Shibnath declares himself to be Tina's husband and therefore the son-in-law (Jamai) of the Bamerjee family. Shibnath begins his mission of fighting Mahim Ghoshal, Rocket and their allies. Mahim on the other hand brings Debnath as a wild card and introduces him to Mamata as Sabitri's long lost son. Mamata accepts Debnath as her stepson while Tina also gives consent. But as Shibnath and Debnath do not recognize each other as childhood friends, they constantly fight one another. Ultimately truth prevails. The childhood mystery of all three are revealed and while Mahim Ghoshal is punished, the entire family reunites again.

== Cast ==
- Prosenjit Chatterjee as Shiba / Shibnath
- Namrata Thapa as Tina, Shiba's wife
- Piya Sengupta as Rani
- Abhishek Chatterjee as Deba Mastan / Debnath
- Anamika Saha as Mamata, Shiba's mother-in-law
- Bodhisattwa Majumdar as Sanatan, Driver
- Dulal Lahiri as Amar Banerjee
- Mrinal Mukherjee as Mahim Ghosal
- Premjit as Rocket, Mahim Ghosal's son

== Music ==
Gharjamai

Soundtrack album by Subhayu
- Genre: Feature film soundtrack
- Length: 20:37
- Label: Eskay Music

Official audio
- Gharjamai – Full Album on YouTube

The music of the film has been composed by Subhayu.

No.	Title	Singer(s)	Length
1.	"Aamar Naamta Je Rani"	Kalpana Patowary	4:31
2.	"Dheere Dheere Kachhe Asa"	Kumar Sanu, Sadhana Sargam	4:08
3.	"O Bhogoban Bosta Bhorti Taka"	Kumar Sanu	4:34
4.	"Cholo Cinema Jabo"	Aritro, Pamela Jain	3:21
5.	"Ke Guru Ke Chala"	Babul Supriyo, Aritro, Priya	4:03
Total length:			20:37
