= Chore Chore Mastuto Bhai =

- DVD Cover
- Directed by: Anup Sengupta
- Written by: Shankar Dasgupta
- Produced by: Ashok Dhanuka
- Starring: Mithun Chakraborty; Chiranjeet Chakraborty; Jisshu Sengupta; Koel Mallick
- Cinematography: K. R. Ramesh
- Music by: Ashok Bhadra
- Production company: Eskay Movies
- Distributed by: Eskay Movies
- Release date: 16 December 2005
- Running time: 130 minutes
- Country: India
- Language: Bengali

Chore Chore Mastuto Bhai is a 2005 Indian Bengali-language action comedy film co-written and directed by Anup Sengupta. Produced by Ashok Dhanuka under the banner of Eskay Movies, it stars Mithun Chakraborty, Chiranjeet Chakraborty, Jisshu Sengupta, Koel Mallick and Dipankar Dey in lead roles, with Jeet in a special appearance.It is a remake of the 1972 Hindi film Victoria No. 203.

== Plot ==
Nagraj sends John to steal a rare diamond worth crores from the museum. John cheats on Nagraj and escapes with the diamond, but is killed by Ronnie, who leaves the diamond with a taxi driver, Yadav Das. Yadav is jailed for John's murder. His daughter Madhuri disguises herself as a boy and drives the taxi to support her family. Manik and Chand turn up at Madhuri's house claiming to be her long lost uncles from Africa. Madhuri is in love with Rahul, Nagraj's adopted son. Since the diamond is the main attraction, everyone wants to possess it. In the climax, Manik and Chand rescue Rahul, Madhuri and Maloti from Nagraj and the police arrest Nagraj.

== Cast ==
- Mithun Chakraborty as Manik
- Chiranjeet Chakraborty as Chand
- Jisshu Sengupta as Rahul, Chand's nephew, Nagraj's adopted son
- Koel Mallick as Madhuri, Maloti's younger sister
- Piya Sengupta as Maloti, Madhuri's elder sister
- Ramen Roy Chowdhury as taxi driver Yadav Das, Maloti and Madhuri's father
- Deepankar Dey as Naagraj, the main antagonist, Rahul's adoptive father
- Shankar Chakraborty as Ronnie, Naagraj's henchman and a Skilled knife-thrower
- Raja Chatterjee as Anthony D'suza, Naagraj's henchman and a Skilled shooter
- Manjushree Ganguly as Dora, Naagraj's henchwoman
- Joy Badlani as John Louis, Naagraj's henchman
- Shyamal Dutta as Raghu, Naagraj's driver
- Anamika Saha as Constable Kaberi
- Subhashish Mukherjee as Lattu

Special Appearances

- Tapas Paul as Jailor Dulal Bhowmik
- Jeet as Himself (in the song "Gol Gol Gol")

== Soundtrack ==
Chore Chore Mastuto Bhai

Soundtrack album by Ashok Bhadra
- Genre: Feature film soundtrack
- Length: 24:42
- Language: Bengali
- Label: Eskay Music

Official audio
- Chore Chore Mastuto Bhai - Full Album on YouTube

The album is composed by Ashok Bhadra for Chore Chore Mastuto Bhai.

| No. | Title | Singer(s) | Length |
|---|---|---|---|
| 1. | "Gol Gol Gol" | Kumar Sanu, Abhijeet | 05:19 |
| 2. | "Chore Chore Mastuto Bhai" | Kumar Sanu, Vinod Rathod | 04:01 |
| 3. | "Dekha Holo Dekha" | Babul Supriyo, Anuradha Paudwal | 05:02 |
| 4. | "Ei Rate Kache Eso Na" | Shreya Ghosal | 05:30 |
| 5. | "Aha Ragle Tomay" | Babul Supriyo | 04:50 |
| Total length: | | | 24:42 |
