= Eastern India Motion Picture Association =

Film industry

Eastern India Motion Picture Producers’ Association
- Abbreviation: EIMPA
- Established: 1945; 81 years ago
- Founder: Anadinath Bose
- Headquarters: 98E, B. N. Sircar Sarani, West Bengal - 700072
- Website: Official website

Eastern India Motion Picture Association (EIMPA) is a trade organization based in Kolkata that represents producers, distributors, and exhibitors in the West Bengal and Eastern Indian film industry. Founded in 1945 by Anadinath Bose, it functions as a regulatory body, handling film title registration and supporting the commercial growth of Eastern Indian cinema.

== List of presidents ==
Term of office	Name	Ref.
1945—1948	Anadinath Bose	
1949	B N Sircar	
1950—1951	M D Chatterjee	
1951—1952	B N Sircar	
1953—1961	M D Chatterjee	
1962	Monoranjan Ghosh	
1963—1967	M D Chatterjee	
1968—1978	S L Jalan	
1979—1982	K K Choudhury	
1983—1985	Parimal Kumar Sarkar	
1986—1990	S L Jalan	
1991	S L Jalan	
1991	A Karim	
1991—1995	Pronab Kumar Bose	
1995—1996	Sardarmull Kankaria	
1996—2000	Parimal Kumar Sarkar	
2000—2001	L C Bakliwal	
2001—2002	Rabindra Agarwal	
2002—2004	Arijit Dutta	
2004—2005	M A K Sayeed	
2005—2006	J K Agarwal	
2006—2007	Bijay Kr. Khemka	
2007—2008	Ajit Bhattacharjee	
2008—2010	Surinder Singh	
2010—2011	Bijay Kalyani	
2011—2013	Surinder Singh	
2013—2017	Shrikant Mohta	
2017—2018	Shrikant Mohta	
2017—2018	Krishna Narayan Daga	
2018—2019	Krishna Narayan Daga	
2018—2019	Piya Sengupta	
2019—present	Piya Sengupta	

== Controversy ==
Following a landslide victory of the BJP over the Trinamool Congress in the 2026 West Bengal Assembly Elections, a number of producers and directors from Bengali film industry staged protests outside EIMPA office demanding Piya Sengupta's immediate resignation.
