= Raktamukhi Neela =

- Directed by: Debraj Sinha
- Written by: Debjoy Banerjee
- Produced by: Sushmita Roy
- Starring: Sabyasachi Chakrabarty; Dolon Roy
- Cinematography: Badal Sarkar and Sandip Sen
- Edited by: Tapas Chakraborty
- Release date: 9 September 2008
- Country: India
- Language: Bengali

Raktamukhi Neela (Bengali: রক্তমুখি নীলা) is a Bengali mystery movie released in 2008. Directed by Debraj Sinha, the movie featured Sabyasachi Chakrabarty, Dolon Roy, Deepankar De, June Malia and Bhaskar Bandyopadhyay. This movie has no relation whatsoever with Sharadindu Bandyopadhyay's famous thriller novel of the same name.

== Plot ==
Many would presume "Raktamukhi Neela" to be a murder mystery involving some precious stones or mementos. In reality the film is about the murder of actress Neela Sen on the sets of an under production film, named "Raktamukhi Neela". Neela Sen is found dead in her room. Insp. Chakraborty (Sabyasachi Chakrabarty), the officer-in-charge of the case investigates to find out that the ace actress had been poisoned by arsenic. He begins to investigate and finds out that Neela Sen had illegitimate liaisons with the film's lead actor Chand Kumar (Bhaskar Bandopadhyay) for a long time. It also revealed that Neela had planned to dump Chand for marrying director Manish Bardhan (who was incidentally directing Raktamukhi Neela). The villain of the film Raju Ray, who was also a seasoned actor, had a serious relation with Bipasha (the hair-dresser of the unit). Bipasha was the entity who had introduced Neela with the domain of filmdom. After the murder, when things go awry, Insp. Chakraborty begins to unravel mysteries about Neela's past and the nature of bonding she shared with each character. He found out that Chand Kumar had a live in relation with Neela even though he was married to Manisha (Dolon Roy), another established actress. Then there was Dipika (June Maliyah) who was a newcomer full of talent and was not ready to compromise with her moralities for any reasons what so ever. There was the production-boy Prashanta, who was vested with the responsibility of supplying food and beverages on the sets. The shooting was being held at Baruipur Rajbari. Insp. Chakraborty fights to the brink for unmasking the culprit. Meanwhile, Bipasha is brutally murdered in her room (she was strangled to death). While every body on the set go berserk is shock and awe, the third murder takes place. Manisha toppled from the balcony of her roof. The three murders give the nature of the case an entirely unique purview. Insp. Chakraborty investigates to unravel that Prashanta is the actual culprit. He was Neela's actual husband. Neela dumped Prashanta and their son Babu for making a mark on celluloid. Later the penniless Prashanta (who was actually a talented chemist) fails to save his ailing son. This makes him transform to a psycho who hates all women from the silver screen. He kills Neela by giving her arsenic (which he made himself) and also whacks off the other two before targeting Dipika. But he fails and truth is revealed.

== Cast ==
- Sabyasachi Chakraborty as Inspector Chakraborti
- Dolon Roy
- Tapas Chakraborty
- Deepankar De
- June Malia
- Bhaskar Bandyopadhyay
- Raja Chattopadhyay
- Piyali
- Shakti
- Titas
