= Anu Choudhury =

Indian actress

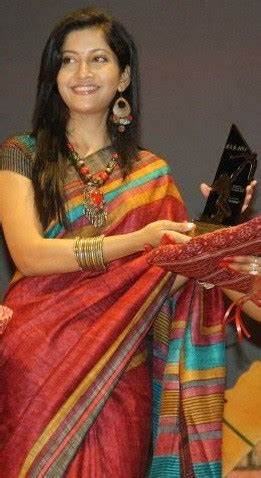
- Choudhury in Ekalabya Award Show
- Born: Anusuya Dash Choudhury; Bhubaneswar, Orissa, India
- Education: Rama Devi Women's University; Manipal University
- Occupations: Actress; Politician; Activist
- Years active: 1999–present
- Political party: Bharatiya Janata Party (2018–present)
- Spouse: Sandip Mishra (m. 2006; div. 2008)

Vice President of BJP Mahila Morcha, Odisha
- In office 20 February 2021 – 4 August 2023

Anusuya Dash Choudhury, known professionally as Anu Choudhury, is an Indian actress and politician who predominantly works in Odia, Bengali, Telugu, and Hindi films. Her debut Odia film was Maa Gojabayani in 1999.

== Career ==
=== Career in Odia film industry ===
Anu began her career in Odia film as a child artist. She acted in two movies, Badhu Nirupama and Mamata Mage Mula with very small roles. Her first film as main lead actress was Maa Gojabayani in 1999. In her first movie though there were no such big stars, but still with her effort she was eligible to compete with Rachana Banerjee in Ollywood during that period. She won praise for her acting in the film. For her first movie she got Odisha State Film Award for Best Actress for that movie in Chalachitra Jagat award. Since then, she has acted in a number of films, Biswaprakash. In Biswaprakash she acted with actress Nandita Das which movie is a part of Indian Panorama.

Then she did movies like Mana Rahigala Tumari Thare, Maa-O-Mamata, Gare Sindura Dhare Luha. For Gare Sindura Dhare Luha movie she got Orissa State Film Awards as best actress. Anu next appeared in the movie Rakhi Bandhili Mo Rakhiba Mana. She also acted in Sashu Ghara Chalijibi which was produced by Rajshri Productions and co-starred Siddhanta Mahapatra.

Her first film in Bengali was Ram Lakshman but Surya was released first in 2004. Both films had Prosenjit Chatterjee in the male lead. She has also acted in a Telugu movie Subha Bela directed by V.B. Ramana. Anu gave a super hit movie " Maa Gojabayani" at the entry of her into film industry. Her 1st Telugu movie was Subhavela. At the peak of her career she got married and after a very short time period, she had seven releases as lead actress in a single year 2007 out of which four were hits. Due to some personal issues she left Odia industry for two years and back to industry after two years with two flop movies. But again she gave a hit number with " Pahili Raja" in which she played a cop character.

In 2022, she debuted in Odia television with Sarbajita Anu on Zee Sarthak.

=== Career in South industry ===
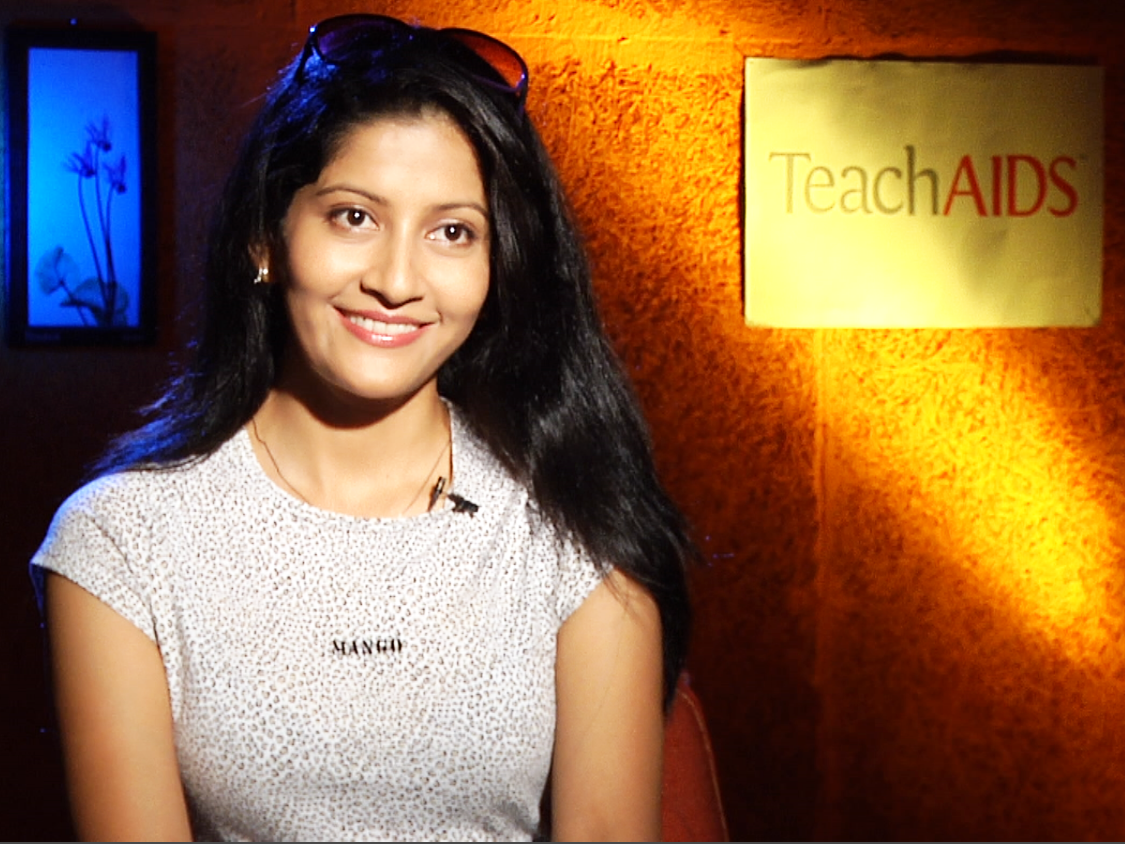
Choudhury in TeachAids interview in 2013

Anu Choudhury started her career with the Telugu movie Subhavela which was into controversy in 2000.

The movie revolves around a young woman, Satya, (Anu) who dumps her bridegroom at the altar, not once but four times. The reason – her best friend attempts suicide after marriage. This unusual behaviour attracts the attention of journalist Surya (Vijay), who begins writing a serial version for his newspaper, which turns into a best-seller.

Anu Choudhury continued to act in Muthyam and then Manasu Telusuko, but did not have much success in the south Indian film industry.

=== Career in Bengali industry ===
Anu started her Bengali film career in 2004 with movie Surya opposite Prasenjit Chatterjee. Then she continued to be attached to the Bengali film industry as one after another she appeared in movies like Ram Laxman, Dadar Adesh, etc.

Her notable movies with Prasenjit Chatterjee are Surya, Dadar Adesh, Rajmohol, Jamai Raja, Rajkumar etc. Anu also appeared in the movies Hangama, Abhimanyu and Mahaguru. She was also seen a very prominent character in Thikana Rajpath with a deglam role. Lastly she was seen in " Aami Aachi Sei Je Tomar " in 2011.

=== Bollywood debut and film breakthrough ===
Anu got a break in the Hindi movie Nirvana 13, directed by Jitin Rawat, currently streaming on MX Player. Nirvana 13 is a story about a patient's cry for relief from agony and a nurse who is silently wishing for the same. The two have a conversation about their struggles with morality and helplessness and their constant quest for a way out. This provokes different perspectives of the pragmatic and spiritual aspects of life and death.

Anu Choudhury is playing the character of Marium D'souza in the movie. Anu received best actress award for her 1st Hindi movie Nirvana 13 in Los Angeles movie award. She was the only Indian actress selected for this award in 2011.

The subject is interesting, mature and it’s made for a mature audience. The character I have played in this is very strong and I was in doubt whether I can justify it or not as I have not done anything like this before. We have had multiple workshops before going to the shooting floor, and that’s when I gathered some courage in me and felt like yes I can do this. Both my co-actor Sandeep and director Jitin are brilliant, so I have learned a lot during the workshops with them. As the story is set in the night, we were shooting it during the night only. I remember during shooting, in real life our nights have become days and days have become nights.

— Anu Choudhury on her Nirvana 13 shooting experience

Anu has also worked in a film Babloo Happy Hai based on youth released in 2013 with talented director Nila Madhab Panda with costars Parvin Dabas, Sahil Anand, Erica Fernandes.

Nila Madhav Panda is a very sensible filmmaker who represents good cinema. I was really keen on working with him when I got the offer

— Anu Choudhury in an interview

The director Nila Madhab Panda said, "I have seen Anu's work and really liked her. It was Anu's talent that made me finalise her."

=== Social activism and commercials ===
Anu Choudhury has been a committed social activist, active in supporting child survival and fighting AIDS and injustice in real life. Anu has worked as a brand ambassador for UNICEF, Lalchand Jewellers, Kanchan Jewellery, Ruchi Curry Powder, Epari Sadashiv Jewellery etc. She has been a brand ambassador for more than 20 commercials. She says, "Along with films I have been doing commercials for the last ten years and it's natural that the product manufacturers want us to endorse their brand since we have face value. And it's obvious that we won't do it for charity but then money is not everything." She has been brand ambassador for prestigious Emami edible oil. Anu is also working as a brand ambassador for FAME (First Academy of Media and Entertainment)in Odisha. Anu Chaudhury, along with Ms Shabana Azmi, renowned actress and former Member of Parliament, noted Indian classical dancer Ms Shovan Narayan and rockstar Mr Subir Malik, member of the Parikrama band, were declared as brand ambassador for safe motherhood, champion and Youth Icon for Safe Motherhood, respectively.

Choudhury was appointed as Brand ambassador for a public awareness campaign, "Bijuli Didi" on behalf of all the electric distribution utilities of the State, CESU, NESCO, WESCO and SOUTHCO, and all the franchisees working in the CESU area. The brand Bijuli Didi was unveiled at a function by Odisha Electricity Regulatory Commission (OERC) Chairman Satya Prakash Nanda. As part of the Bijuli Didi campaign, Anu will make people aware about simple facts that will help people to conserveelectricity, check power theft and pay bills on time.

On 1 November 2013, Anu Choudhury was declared to be part of TeachAids, a nonprofit organisation that develops HIV prevention education technology materials, based on an approach invented through research at Stanford University. On 21 November 2013 official launching of TeachAids of Odia version was done. A teaser of the animated software, which features the caricatures and voices of actors Akash Dasnayak, Anu Choudhury, Prashant Nanda and Odissi dancer Aruna Mohanty, will be released online (www.teachaids.org) on 1 December to mark the occasion of World Aids Day. Anu said the "revolutionary product" would combat ignorance about HIV as it is likely to be introduced in schools and colleges from next year. A preview of the film was screened for the media here on Thursday.

== Political career ==
In January 2018, Choudhury joined the Bharatiya Janata Party. She has campaigned for the party in the 2019 elections at Patkura constituency, 2021 Pipili by elections and 2022 Khallikote Panchayat elections.

Choudhury is a member of the special invitees as part of the state executive of BJP Odisha. On 15 February 2020, the Bhubaneswar MP Aparajita Sarangi appointed her as the representative of Begunia for the MP which falls under the parliamentary constituency. Choudhury was appointed the vice-president of BJP Mahila Morcha, Odisha on 20 February 2021, until 2023 when the succeeding team was appointed.

== Personal life ==
Choudhury completed her education from Biju Patnaik College of Science and Education and graduated in science from Rama Devi Women's University. She completed her PG in IT from Manipal University.

She was married to businessman Sandip Mishra in 2006, but was divorced in 2008.

== Filmography ==
=== Films ===
Denotes films that have not yet been released

Year	Title	Role	Language	Notes
1985	Mamata Mage Mula		Odia	Child artist
1987	Badhu Nirupama		Odia	Child artist
1999	Maa Gojabayani		Odia	Chalachitra Jagat Award for Best Actress
1999	Biswaprakash		Odia	
2000	Mana rahigala tumari thare		Odia	
2000	Subhavela	Satya	Telugu	
2001	Gare Sindura Dhare Luha		Odia	Won Orissa State Film Awards for Best Actress
2001	Samaya kheluchi chaka bhaunri		Odia	
2001	Muthyam	Anu	Telugu	
2002	Rakhi bandhili mo rakhiba mana		Odia	Won Orissa State Film Awards for Best Actress
2002	Manasu Telusuko		Telugu	
2002	Pua Mora Jagata Jita		Odia	
2003	Sabata Maa	Rama	Odia	
2003	Mor sang chalav		Chhattisgarhi	
2003	Rakata Kahiba Kia Kahara		Odia	Won Best Actress in various film awards
2004	Rakhiba jadi se mariba kia		Odia	
2004	Agni parikhya		Odia	
2004	Omm Santi Omm		Odia	Won Orissa State Film Awards for Best Actress
2004	Hari Bhai Harena	Shibani	Odia	
2004	Surya	Rina	Bengali	
2005	Dadar Adesh	Puja	Bengali	
2005	Baji		Odia	
2005	Sashughara Chalijibi	Sita	Odia	Won Orissa State Film Awards for Best Actress
2005	Topae Sindura Di Topa Luha		Odia	
2005	Rajmohol	Deboshree	Bengali	
2005	Ram Laxman	Radha	Bengali	
2006	Babu I Love You		Odia	
2006	Prema Ritu Asila Re		Odia	
2006	Abhimanyu	Titli	Bengali	
2006	Hungama		Bengali	
2007	Dhauli Express	Tila	Odia	
2007	Chaka Chaka Bhaunri		Odia	
2007	Tumaku Paruni Ta Bhuli		Odia	
2007	Kalishankar		Odia	
2007	Lal Tuku Tuku Sadhaba Bahu		Odia	
2007	Kathantara	Kalpana	Odia	Best Actress award at 4th International Film Festival of India
2007	Samaya Hathare Dori		Odia	
2007	Sudu Tomar Janyo		Bengali	
2007	Kalishankar		Odia-Bengali	
2007	Mahaguru		Bengali	
2008	Hasiba Puni Mo Suna Sansar		Odia	
2008	Rajkumar		Bengali	
2009	Tume Hi Sathi Mora	Shikha	Odia	
2009	Jamai Raja		Bengali	
2010	Pahili Raja	Sweta	Odia	
2010	Thikana Rajpath	Malla	Bengali	
2011	Ami achi sei je tomar	Priya	Bengali	
2011	Kemiti E Bandhana		Odia	
2013	Matira Bandhana		Odia	
2013	Sindura		Odia	Guest appearance
2013	TeachAids	Voice (Female student)	Odia	Animated movie to be released on 1 December World Aids Day
2014	Sweet heart	Gracy	Odia	Delayed
2014	Babloo Happy Hai	Deepa	Hindi	
2014	Ganja Ladhei	Malli	Odia	
2015	Maya	Maya	Odia	
2015	Hey Prabhu Dekha De		Odia	
2016	Sweet Heart		Odia	
2017	God Father-True Story of a Man	Saloni	Odia	
2019	Tu mo Love story-2	Kritika	Odia	
2019	Nayakara Na Debadaasa	Paro	Odia	
2019	Chhabirani	Namita	Odia	
2020	72 Hours	Anu	Odia	Web series
2020	Anu Didi Not out	Anu	Odia	Telefilm
2021	Nirvana 13	Mariam Dsouza	Hindi	Best Actress award in Los Angeles Movie Awards
2021	Pihu	Sandhya	Odia	
2021	Maa Ra Mamata		Odia	
2023	Mind Game		Odia	
2023	Katak Shesha ru Arambha		Odia	
2024	Atithi		Odia	
2024	Parab		Odia	
2025	Nispati		Odia	
2025	Murali		Odia	
2025	Hunkar		Odia	

=== Television ===
Year	Title	Role	Network	Notes	Ref.
2022	Sarbajita Anu	Anu	Zee Sarthak	Lead, 253 episodes	

=== Theatre ===
Year	Title	Role	Notes	Ref.
2023	Bayasara Ante	Pratima Mishra	Odia One Theatre Group	

== Awards and nominations ==
Anu Choudhury awards and nominations
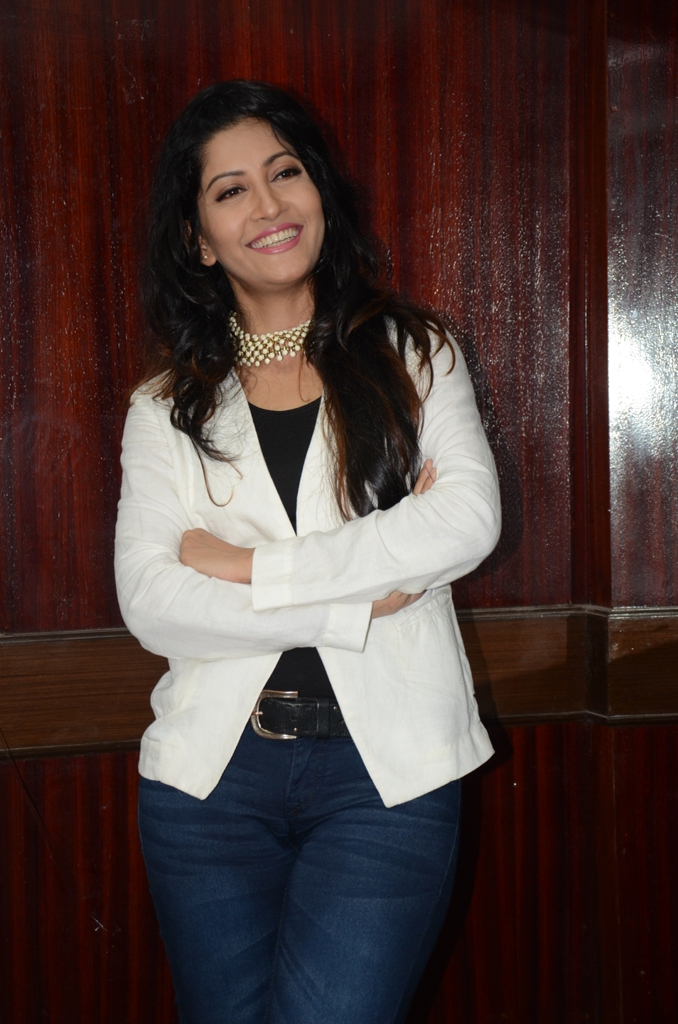
Awards and nominations
Award	Wins	Nominations
Odisha State Film Awards	4	

Totals (Note: Certain award groups do not simply award one winner. They acknowledge several different recipients, have runners-up, and have third place. Since this is a specific recognition and is different from losing an award, runner-up mentions are considered wins in this award tally. For simplification and to avoid errors, each award in this list has been presumed to have had a prior nomination.)
- Wins: 4

Anu Chowdhury was adjudged the Best Actress for her performance in Sasughara Chalijibi at the 2005 Orissa State Film Awards ceremony held at Bhubaneswar on 30 May 2007. She won the best Actress Award in the 4th Cine India International Film Festival, Noida for her portrayal of a second generation refugee from East Bengal in the Kadambinee Media Pvt Ltd. productions Kathantara.

On 30 December 2007, Anu won the Best Actress Award at the "Chalachhitra Jagat Pratibha Samman – 2007" for her performance in the Odia movie Lal Tuku Tuku Sadhaba Bahu. she is four time state award winner for best actress category. Anu again received best actress award for her 1st Hindi movie Nirvana 13 in Los Angeles movie award. She was the only Indian actress selected for this award in 2011.

=== State Awards ===
Anu has received the glorious Orissa State Film Awards for Best Actress four times

- 2001 – Orissa State Film Awards, Gare Sindura Dhare Luha
- 2002 – Orissa State Film Awards, Rakhi Bandhili Mo Rakhiba Mana
- 2004 – Orissa State Film Awards, Omm Santi Omm
- 2005 – Orissa State Film Awards, Sashu Ghara Chalijibi

=== International Awards ===
- 2006 – Best Actress award for Kathantara in 4th International Film Festival of India, Noida
- 2011 – Best Actress award for Nirvana 13 in Los Angeles Movie Awards

== Notes ==
- "Anu Choudhury – the Star of Orissa". Orissa Times. 11 December 2007. Archived from the original on 5 January 2009.
