= Sonali Chakraborty =

Indian actress and dancer (1963–2022)

- Born: 1963; Calcutta, West Bengal, India
- Died: 31 October 2022 (aged 59)
- Occupations: Actress; dancer
- Years active: 1982–2022
- Spouse: Shankar Chakraborty

Sonali Chakraborty (1963 – 31 October 2022) was an Indian actress and dancer who worked in Bengali language films and television series. She has worked mainly in theatres, but she has also worked in films and on television. She last appeared in the serial Gantchora as the grandmother. She also appeared in films such as Dadar Kirti (1980), Haar Jeet (2000)) and Bandhan (2004) etc.

== Personal life and death ==
Sonali Chakraborty was born in Calcutta (now Kolkata) in a Bengali family. She married actor Shankar Chakraborty in 1990.

Chakraborty suffered from liver complications in later life. She died on 31 October 2022, at the age of 59. Chief Minister of West Bengal, Mamata Banerjee expressed condolences regarding her death.

== Filmography ==
- Dadar Kirti (1980)
- Satyajiter Goppo (1998)
- Haar Jeet (2000)
- Bandhan (2004)

== Television ==
- Nachni (N/A)
- Gantchora (2022)
