= Mayer Anchal =

Indian movie

- A poster of Mayer Anchal
- Directed by: Anup Sengupta
- Based on: Anchal play by Lokkrishti
- Produced by: Apurba Saha
- Starring: Prosenjit Chatterjee; Ranjit Mallick; Rachna Banerjee; Piya Sengupta
- Music by: Ashok Bhadra
- Production company: Apurba Productions
- Distributed by: Eskay Movies
- Release date: 18 September 2003 (India)
- Country: India
- Language: Bengali

Mayer Anchal is a 2003 Indian Bengali-language drama film directed by Anup Sengupta and produced by Apurba Saha. It is a remake of the 2000 Hindi-language film Jis Desh Mein Ganga Rehta Hain which itself was a remake of 1972 Marathi film Ekta Jeev Sadashiv.

== Cast ==
- Prosenjit Chatterjee as Bhola Chowdhury
- Ranjit Mallick as Janardhan, Bhola's adopted father
- Anamika Saha as Mamata, Bhola's adopted mother
- Tapas Paul as Manish Chowdhury, Bhola's elder brother
- Rachna Banerjee as Rupa, Bhola's love interest
- Mrinal Mukherjee as Raghav Dutta, Rinky's father & retired colonel
- Abhishek Chatterjee as Sujoy Chowdhury, Bhola's younger brother
- Piya Sengupta as Rinky Dutta
- Subhasish Mukherjee as Nandu, Bhola's friend
- Dipankar De as Tridip Chowdhury, Bhola's biological father
- Shankar Chakraborty as Jaga, main antagonist
- Anuradha Roy as Bishakha Chowdhury, Bhola's biological mother
- Locket Chatterjee as Naina Chowdhury, Bhola's sister-in-law
- Biplab Chatterjee as Inspector Panda
- Raja Chattopadhyay as Mr. Mallick

== Production ==
Filming of a song sequence took place at Kalimpong.

== Music ==
Ashok Bhadra composed the soundtrack album to the film, which includes songs rendered by Shreya Ghoshal, Kumar Sanu, Shaan and Babul Supriyo.

== Release and reception ==
Mayer Anchal was released on 18 September 2003 and received a highly positive commercial response. One person was killed and twenty-two were injured due to grenade explosions by the United Liberation Front of Assam during a screening of the film on 14 August 2004 at the Uravi cinema hall in Gauripur.

== Accolades ==
Babul Supriyo won the Kalakar Award for Best Male Playback Singer in 2004 for his contribution to the film's soundtrack.
