= Tapan Banerjee =

Indian cricketer (1943–2017)

Personal information
- Full name: Tapan Jyoti Banerjee
- Born: 15 June 1943; Kanpur, United Provinces, British India
- Died: 29 May 2017 (aged 73)
- Source: Cricinfo, 25 March 2016

Tapan Banerjee (15 June 1943 – 29 May 2017) was an Indian cricketer. He played eighteen first-class matches for Bengal between 1965 and 1983.

== See also ==
- List of Bengal cricketers
