= Jekhane Ashray =

- Directed by: Amitabha Mitra
- Story by: Amitabha Mitra
- Produced by: Amitabha Mitra Productions
- Starring: Debraj Ray; Mahua Roychoudhury; Nirmal Kumar; Gita Dey
- Cinematography: Janak Ghosh
- Edited by: G. G. Patil
- Music by: Amitabha Mitra; Sailesh; Prabal
- Release date: 10 July 2009
- Country: India
- Language: Bengali

Jekhane Ashray is a 2009 Bengali drama film directed by Amitabha Mitra. This film was released under the banner of Amitabha Mitra Productions.

== Cast ==
- Mahua Roychoudhury
- Nirmal Kumar
- Gita Dey
- Debraj Ray
- Ratna Ghoshal
- Soumitra Bandyopadhyay
- Joy Bandyopadhyay
