= Dadar Adesh =

- Theatrical release poster
- Directed by: Anup Sengupta
- Produced by: Anup Sengupta; Nimai Panja; Paban Kanoria; Piya Sengupta
- Starring: See below
- Cinematography: K R Ramesh
- Music by: Ashok Bhadra
- Release date: 6 May 2005
- Country: India
- Language: Bengali

Dadar Adesh (দাদার আদেশ) is a 2005 Bengali action drama film directed by Anup Sengupta and produced by Anup Sengupta, Nimai Panja, Paban Kanoria, and Piya Sengupta. The film features actors Prosenjit Chatterjee, Anu Chowdhury, Ranjit Mallick, and Abhishek Chatterjee in the lead roles. Music of the film has been composed by Ashok Bhadra. The film is a remake of the Malayalam film Hitler.

== Cast ==
- Prosenjit Chatterjee as Bijoy Roy
- Anu Chowdhury as Puja Chowdhury, Bijoy's love interest
- Ranjit Mallick as Krishnokanto Roy, Bijoy's father
- Abhishek Chatterjee as Raj Chowdhury, Puja's brother & Seema's husband
- Piya Sengupta as Seema Roy, Bijoy's sister
- Rupanjana Mitra as Jhumaa Roy
- Priyanka Sarkar as Titli Roy
- Joy Badlani as Kali, a dreaded goon & then mafia leader
- Shankar Chakraborty as Munna, Kali's younger brother
- Ritoja Majumder as Asha Roy
- Lokesh Ghosh as Kartik Ghosh
- Ramen Roy Chowdhury as Bimal Chowdhury, Puja & Raj's father
- Anamika Saha as Shanti Chowdhury, Puja & Raj's mother

== Soundtrack ==
Dadar Adesh

Soundtrack album by Ashok Bhadra
- Genre: Feature film soundtrack
- Length: 29:33
- Language: Bengali
- Label: Eskay Music

Official audio
- Dadar Adesh - Full Album on YouTube

The music of the film has been composed by Ashok Bhadra.

No.	Title	Singer(s)	Length
1.	"Jani Na Kothay Tumi"	Mohammed Aziz, Priya Bhattacharya, Shreya Ghoshal	5:00
2.	"Tomake Prothom Dekhei"	Alka Yagnik, Kumar Sanu	5:20
3.	"Prem Korechhe Minya Bibi"	Babul Supriyo, Shreya Ghoshal	5:30
4.	"Tomake Samne Dekheyi"	Babul Supriyo, Sadhana Sargam	5:10
5.	"Joname Joname"	Mohammed Aziz, Priya Bhattacharya, Shreya Ghoshal	3:20
6.	"Prem Jibaner Asha"	Shaan, Shreya Ghoshal	5:13
Total length:			29:33
