= Arjun Aamar Naam =

- Directed by: Prabir Nandi
- Written by: Jarathi Som
- Starring: Soumitra Chatterjee; Abhishek Chatterjee; Santu Mukhopadhyay; Sukhen Das
- Music by: Amit Dasgupta
- Production company: Angel Digital Private Limited
- Release date: 2003
- Running time: 147 minutes
- Country: India
- Language: Bengali

Arjun Aamar Naam (transl. My name is arjun) is a Bengali language action drama film directed by Prabir Nandi and produced by Jayanta Bhattacharya. This film was released in 2003 in the banner of Angel Digital Private Limited.

== Plot ==
Arjun lives in a village. He lost his father and lives with his mother and maternal uncles. He is very helpful hence becomes popular to the villagers. He faces a lot of problem and obstacles from the rich and powerful persons of the village. At the end he overcomes all the problems and finds his own family.

== Cast ==
- Soumitra Chatterjee
- Supriya Devi
- Sukhen Das
- Abhishek Chatterjee
- Santu Mukhopadhyay
- Shambhu Bhattacharya
- Anuradha Ray
- Anamika Saha
- Shrestha Mukherjee
- Paran Bandopadhyay
- Ramaprasad Banik
