= Anuradha Roy (actress) =

Indian actress

- Born: Kolkata, India
- Occupation: Actress
- Years active: 1988–present
- Known for: Utsab; Maach Misti & More
- Spouse: Debraj Roy (m. 1976; died 2024)
- Parent(s): Manju Prikash Basu; Prabha Basu

Anuradha Roy is an Indian actress who is recognized for her work in Bengali cinema. She made her film debut with Ajoy Bandopadhyay's horror drama Karoti (1988). She is best known for her role in Utsab (2000) directed by Rituparno Ghosh and Bengali TV serial Rajeshwari where she played Rani Rashmoni

== Filmography ==
- Tumi O Tumi (2020)
- Ami Achhi Sei Je Tomar (2013)
- Hothat Vishon Valo Lagchhe (2013)
- Hoyto Premer Jonno (2013)
- Hridoyer Shabdo (2013)
- Jodi Hridoye Lekho Naam (2013)
- Jug Jug Jio (2013)
- Samadhi (2013)
- Antore Shudhu Tumi (2013)
- Classmate (2013)
- Holud Pakhir Dana (2013)
- Antardaho (2013)
- Maach Misti & More (2013)
- Gundaraj (2013)
- Jaal (2012)
- Student No. 1 (2011)
- Achena Prem (2011)
- Love Connection (2010)
- Poth Jodi Na Shesh Hoy (2010)
- Preyashi (2010)
- Ganyer Meye Sovona (2010)
- Besh Korechi Prem Korechi (2010)
- Saptosur (2009)
- Neel Akasher Chandni (2009)
- Tumi Kar (2008)
- Biyer Lagna (2008)
- Shudhu Tomar Jonyo (2007)
- Bidhatar Lekha (2007)
- I Love You (2007)
- Mahaguru (2007)
- Nabab Nandini (2007)
- Rudra The Fire (2007)
- Sangharsha (2007)
- Agnipariksha (2006)
- Tapasya (2006)
- Nagardola (2005)
- Til Theke Tal (2005)
- Tobu Bhalobasi (2005)
- Kritodas (2004)
- Kuyasha (2004)
- Paribar (2004)
- Pratishodh (2004)
- Ram Lakshman (2004)
- Sajani (2004)
- Samudra Sakshi (2004)
- Andha Prem (2003)
- Arjun Aamar Naam (2003)
- Mayer Anchal (2003)
- Annadata (2002)
- Ektu Chhoan (2002)
- Manush Amanush (2002)
- Pratihinsa (2002)
- Prem Shakti (2002)
- Bangshadhar (2001)
- Bidhatar Khela (2001)
- Etai Swarga (2001)
- Jamaibabu Jindabad (2001)
- Rakhi Purnima (2001)
- Sud Asal (2001)
- Utsab (2001)
- Aamader Janani (2000)
- Bhalobashar Chhoan (2000)
- Harjit (2000)
- Mayna (2000)
- Rupasi Dohai Tomar (2000)
- Shatruta (2000)
- Sasurbari Zindabad (2000)
- Trishul (2000)
- Agni Shikha (1999)
- Tumi Ele Tai (1999)
- Aamar Maa (1998)
- Chowdhury Paribar (1998)
- Sindurer Adhikar (1998)
- Mayar Bandhan (1997)
- Mittir Barir Chhoto Bou (1997)
- Nishpap Asami (1997)
- Banaphul (1996)
- Biyer Phul (1996)
- Jhinukmala (1996)
- Naginkanya (1995)
- Patibrata (1995)
- Sansar Sangram (1995)
- Sukher Asha (1995)
- Amriter Putra (1994)
- Biswas Abiswas (1994)
- Dhusar Godhuli (1994)
- Pratyaghat (1994)
- Tumi Je Aamar (1994)
- Amar Kahini (1993)
- Maan Samman (1993)
- Apan Par (1992)
- Dharma-Yuddha (1992)
- Indrajit (1992)
- Debar (1991)
- Maan Maryada (1991)
- Bhanga Gara (1990)
- Raja Badsha (1990)
- Karoti (1988)

== Television ==
- Gaaner Oparey
- Ishti Kutum
- Bojhena Se Bojhena (TV series)
- Bokul Kotha
- Goyenda Ginni
- Ardhangini (2018 TV series)
- Saanjher Baati
- Ogo Nirupoma
- Gantchhora
- Cheeni (TV series)
- Khelna Bari
- Mittir Bari
- Pratigga
