= Sajoni Aamar Sohag =

2000 film

- Directed by: Anup Sengupta
- Produced by: Rajkumar Kabra; Santu Sinha
- Starring: Satabdi Roy; Prosenjit Chatterjee; Abhishek Chatterjee; Subhasish Mukhopadhyay; Shakuntala Barua; Monu Mukhopadhyay; Bhola Tamang
- Music by: Anupam Dutta
- Release date: 2000
- Country: India
- Language: Bengali

Sajoni Aamar Sohag (Bengali: সজনী আমার সোহাগ) is a 2000 Bengali film directed by Anup Sengupta.The film was produced by Rajkumar Kabra and Santu Sinha. It stars Prosenjit Chatterjee and Satabdi Roy. The film was a major commercial success banking on Chatterjee's stardom as well as his chemistry with Roy.

== Cast ==
- Satabdi Roy as Rani Chowdhury
- Prosenjit Chatterjee as Bijoy
- Abhishek Chatterjee as Siddhartha
- Subhasish Mukhopadhyay as Manager
- Shakuntala Barua as Rani's mother
- Mona Dutta as Rinky, Bijoy and Rani's daughter
- Piya Sengupta as Anjali, Siddhartha's sister
- Monu Mukherjee as Servant
- Ramen Roy Chowdhury as Doctor

== Music ==
This film has been music composed by Anupam Dutta. Track listings :-

- 01. Aaj Ker Eai Din - Kumar Sanu, Alka Yagnik
- 02. Tumi Je Korle Churi - Kumar Sanu, Alka Yagnik
- 03. Boro Loker Beti Tumi - Abhijeet Bhattacharya
- 04. Bhalobasa Dudiner Noy - Ravindra Jain
