= Debraj Sinha =

Indian director

Debraj Sinha is a director of feature films and ad-films in Kolkata and Mumbai, India. He has also created documentary films.

== Filmography ==
=== Commercials ===
Sinha directed commercials for brands including PD Spices, Duta Spices, Triple 7 Match Box, Bausch & Lomb, Monarch Biscuits, Aquatica and Jaya Coconut Oil.

=== Feature films ===
- Raktamukhi Neela—A suspense thriller . It starred Sabyasachi Chakraborty, Dipankar Dey, Dolan Ray and Bhaskar Banerjee)
- Love in Rajasthan—A love-story based in Rajasthan. The film starred Jackie Shroff.
- Akkarshan—A drama depicting women in an urban milieu . It starred Rituparna Sengupta, Samadarshi Dutta, Firdaus, George Baker, Kharaj Mukherjee, Bhaskar Banerjee and Rajatava Dutta.
