= Premjit =

Premjit is a given name. People with the given name include:

- Premjit Lall
- Premjit Singh Laishram
