= Sangharsha =

- Theatrical release poster
- Directed by: Sujit Guha
- Written by: Monotosh Chakraborty
- Screenplay by: Monotosh Chakraborty
- Story by: Akula Siva
- Produced by: Naresh Kumar Jain
- Starring: Prosenjit Chatterjee; Swastika Mukherjee; Sayantani Ghosh; Rajatava Dutta; Mrinal Mukherjee; Anuradha Ray
- Edited by: Atish De Sarkar
- Music by: Malay Ganguly
- Production company: Nikita Arts
- Release date: 1 March 2007
- Country: India
- Language: Bengali

Sangharsha is a 2007 Bengali action drama film directed by Sujit Guha and produced by Naresh Kumar Jain. The film features actors Prosenjit Chatterjee, Swastika Mukherjee, Sayantani Ghosh, and Rajatava Dutta, in the lead roles. It is a remake of the 2006 Telugu film Lakshmi starring Venkatesh, Nayantara and Charmme Kaur.

== Cast ==
- Prosenjit Chatterjee as Bijoy Dev
- Swastika Mukherjee as Nandini
- Sayantani Ghosh as Anjali, Bijoy's PA
- Rajatava Dutta as Janardhan Pal
- Mrinal Mukherjee as Baga
- Subhasish Mukherjee as Man who came to Bijoy's company for demanding money
- Anuradha Ray as Bijoy's mother
- Ramen Roy Chowdhury as Bijoy's father
- Ratan Lakhmani as Prasad Dev
- Rishi Mukherjee as Bijoy's brother-in-law
- Puja Gangopadhyay as Chandra
- Premjit as Vyas Dev
- Dola Chowdhury as Sathi
- Diganta Bagchi as Raghav, Baga's son
- Tanveer Khan as Suresh
- Sumit Ganguly as Babuji
- Kumaresh as Bhuvan, Babuji's younger brother

== Soundtrack ==
Music of the film was composed by Malay Ganguly and lyrics of the album were penned by Gautam Susmit. Babul Supriyo, Alka Yagnik, Sadhana Sargam, Shaan, Shreya Ghoshal, Miss Jojo gave their voices for the album.

All lyrics are written by Gautam Susmit.

No.	Title	Lyrics	Singer(s)	Length
1.	"Ektu Ektu Kore Chaoa"	Gautam Susmit	Shaan, Sadhana Sargam	04:48
2.	"Buker Bhitor Kichu Jeno"	Gautam Susmit	Miss Jojo	05:02
3.	"Kichu Kotha Jayena Bola"	Gautam Susmit	Shaan, Shreya Ghoshal	05:09
4.	"Tomake Prothom Alape"	Gautam Susmit	Babul Supriyo, Alka Yagnik	04:14
5.	"E Bhabey Ek Sutray"	Gautam Susmit	Babul Supriyo, Sadhana Sargam	04:46
6.	"Bechey Thak Bhalobasha (sad)"	Gautam Susmit	Tritoy	02:33
Total length:				26:32
