= Shankar Chakraborty =

Indian film and television actor

- Born: Haradhan Chakraborty; 18 August 1962 (age 63); Khardaha, West Bengal, India
- Occupation: Actor
- Known for: Playing Gansha in Bibaho Abhijan and Arijit in Rani Kahini
- Spouse: Sonali Chakraborty (m. 1990; died 2022)

Shankar Chakraborty (born Haradhan Chakraborty; 18 August 1962) is an Indian film and television actor who primarily works in the Bengali Film Industry and the Bengali Television Industry. He has done several television serials and has appeared in pivotal roles in numerous Bengali films in his career spanning over three decades. In 2025, Chakraborty joined the Bengali folk band "Khyapa" as a singer and musician.

== Personal life ==
Shankar Chakraborty was born to a Bengali Hindu family. He married actress Sonali Chakraborty in 1990. His wife died on 31 October 2022 following prolonged liver complications.

== Filmography ==
- Tobu Mone Rekho (1994)
- Charachar (1994)
- Mejo Bou (1995)
- Sansar Sangram (1995)
- Bhoy (1996) as Samir
- Jiban Sandhan (1997)
- Asukh (1999)
- Uttara (2000) as Balaram
- Moner Majhe Tumi (2003) as Haabu
- Mayer Anchal (2003) as Jaga
- Chore Chore Mastuto Bhai (2005) as Nagraj's henchman
- Dadar Adesh (2005) as Munna
- Dosar (2006) as Mita Ray's Husband
- Ghatak as Bablu Koley
- Hungama (2006)
- Kalishankar (2007) as Beni Madhav
- Greptar (2007) as Arjun Ghosh
- Mahaguru (2007) as Munna
- Janmadata (2008) as Shibnath
- Khela (2008)
- Satyameba Jayate (2008)
- Janala (2009)
- Ek Poloke Ektu Dekha (2011)
- Keloda in Kashmir (2011)
- Gosainbaganer Bhoot (2011) as Godai Daroga
- Bhorer Pakhi (2011)
- Palatak (2012)
- Astra (2012) as Shambhu Da
- Ullas (2012) as Mr. Kambli
- Darling (2012)
- Teen Kanya (2012)
- Dutta Vs Dutta (2012) as Ghenti Kaku
- Final Mission (2013) as Binod Pandey
- Buno Haansh (2014) as Badal Bhai
- Game (2014) as Dibakar Panda
- Naxal (2015) as Arijit Mitra
- Bela Seshe (2015) as Barin
- Arshinagar (2015) as Biswanath Mitra
- Ki Kore Toke Bolbo (2016) as Akash's father
- Love Express (2016) as Ram Prasad Ganguly
- Jio Pagla (2017)
- Total Dadagiri (2018) as Bibhutibhusan Das
- Maati (2018) as Meghla's father
- Mon Jaane Na (2019)
- Jaanbaaz (2019) as Rahim Bhai
- Belashuru (2022) as Barin
- Karnel (Unreleased)
- Bhroon (Unreleased)
- Chitra (unreleased)
- Nibba Nibbi (2026)

== Web series ==
- Chemistry Mashi (2024) as Sushobhon, Sucharita aka Chemistry Mashi's husband - Hoichoi
- Bishohori (2025) as Avinash Mitra - Hoichoi

== Television ==
Year	Serial	Character	Channel
2006-2009	Rani Kahini	Arijit	Zee Bangla
2009 – 2010	Ogo Bodhu Sundori	Ishan's father	Star Jalsha
2009 – 2014	Maa....Tomay Chara Ghum Ashena	Sports teacher	Star Jalsha
2010 – 2014	@Bhalobasha.com	Tora's father	Star Jalsha
2011 – 2015	Ishti Kutum	Dibyajyoti Majumder	Star Jalsha
2014 – 2016	Chokher Tara Tui	Dipyaman Chatterjee	Star Jalsha
2015	Ichche Nodee	Abin Mazumder	Star Jalsha
2016	Punyi Pukur	Aratrika's father	Star Jalsha
2016 – 2017	Ei Chheleta Bhelbheleta	Abir's father	Zee Bangla
2016 – 2018	Kusum Dola	Ananyo Bose	Star Jalsha
2017 – 2018	Kundo Phuler Mala	Angshu's father	Star Jalsha
2018 – 2019	Phagun Bou	Amitava Ghosh	Star Jalsha
2018 – 2021	Krishnakoli	Basanta Choudhury	Zee Bangla
2019 – 2020	Kunjochaya	Subhash Sanyal	Star Jalsha
2020	Titli	Anup Sanyal	Star Jalsha
2021	Desher Maati	Shramanjit Mukherjee	Star Jalsha
2021 – 2022	Dhulokona	Halua	Star Jalsha
2022 – 2023	Guddi	Amitava Chatterjee aka Jethumani	Star Jalsha
2024 – 2025	Mittir Bari	Ajay Mitra	Zee Bangla
2025	Roshnai	Deeptajeet	Star Jalsha
