= Abhimanyu (2006 film) =

- Film poster
- Directed by: Swapan Saha
- Written by: N.K. Salil (Story, Screenplay & Dialogues)
- Produced by: Pooja Kapoor
- Starring: Mithun Chakraborty; Oindrila Sen; Tapas Paul; Rajatava Dutta; Debashree Roy; Jisshu Sengupta; Biswajit Chakraborty; Dulal Lahiri; Locket Chatterjee; Anu Choudhury
- Edited by: Suresh Urs
- Music by: Ashok Bhadra
- Release date: 4 August 2006
- Country: India
- Language: Bengali

Abhimanyu is a 2006 Indian Bengali language spy action thriller film directed by Swapan Saha, starring Mithun Chakraborty, Tapas Paul, Rajatava Dutta and Debashree Roy. The film was in the news in 2021, when actor Chakraborty recited some of his most famous one-liners from the film, when he officially joined BJP.

== Plot ==
Durjoy Ray is a terrorist leader who has links with Kamal Pasha, another leader across the border. One of Durjoy Ray's commanders, Raghab Ray is caught by Inspector Raj Sinha. Many terrorists are killed in the encounter. To take revenge, Durjoy Ray's team members kill all the members of Raj Sinha's family, barring Nandini - Raj's sister-in-law, and her daughter Rimi. Raj gets the news that terrorists may again attack his family. Nandini and Rimi are not in the house and are thus safe. Raj learns that his long-lost friend Abhimanyu Nag is still alive. Abhimanyu is a very capable officer of the crime branch, but when he fails to overpower a group of terrorists who were trying to cross the border because he failed to give the "pipe" order, he is suspended permanently from his job. He is accused of having links with the terrorists. The truth, however, is that Abhimanyu's wife and daughter were being held at gunpoint at that time, making Abhimanyu completely helpless. Raj appoints Abhimanyu the bodyguard of Nandini and Rimi. Though initially reclusive, Abhimanyu strikes a friendship with Rimi and also with her mother Nannui. But Rimi is kidnapped one day and Abhimanyu is left wounded and hospitalised. Bikram Sen blames Abhimanyu for this event. Terrorists want Raghab Ray in exchange for Rimi. Abhimanyu learns of Bikram Sen's deal with Durjoy Ray in exchange of Raghab Ray for Rimi. He kills Bikram. Rimi escapes with help from a terrorist, but is again caught. Raj Sinha locates the place where Durjoy Ray and the released terrorist Raghab are hiding. Police carry out raids. Abhimanyu kills Raghab and Durjay but finally he himself succumbs to fatal wounds.

== Cast ==
- Mithun Chakraborty as Abhimanyu Nag, Officer At Crime Branch, later suspended, Raj Sinha's friend
- Joy Badlani as Mustafa, Crime head and right-hand of Durjoy Ray
- Biswajit Chakraborty as Bikram Sen, Home Minister, Nandini's father and Rimi's grandfather
- Locket Chatterjee as Abhimanyu's Wife
- Sumit Ganguly as Raghav Ray/Bunty Suleimaan
- Oindrila Sen as Rimi, Sumit and Nandini's daughter
- Tapas Paul as ACP Raj Sinha
- Rajatava Dutta as Durjoy Ray, Terrorist Leader
- Debashree Roy as Nandini, Sumit's wife and Rimi's mother
- Anu Choudhury as Titli, Ajit's Love-interest
- Piya Sengupta as Manashi Sinha, Raj Sinha's wife
- Raja Chattopadhyay as Sumit Sinha, Nandini's husband and Rimi's father
- Jisshu Sengupta as Ajit Ghosh, Police Inspector
- Dulal Lahiri as ACP Crime Branch

== Crew ==
- Poster designer - Goutam Barat
- Production designer - Indranil Ghosh
