= Ram Laxman (film) =

- Theatrical release poster
- Directed by: Babu Ray
- Produced by: Jhuna Majumdar; Narayan Ghosh
- Starring: See below
- Music by: Babul Bose
- Release date: 2004
- Country: India
- Language: Bengali

Ram Laxman (রাম লক্ষণ) is a 2004 Bengali-language action crime film directed by Babu Ray and produced by Jhuna Majumdar and Narayan Ghosh. The film features actors Prosenjit Chatterjee, Anu Chowdhury, and Tota Ray Chowdhury in the lead roles. Music of the film has been composed by Babul Bose.

== Plot ==
The story begins with Subhankar Sanyal and Madhuri Sanyal are a married couple living in Darjeeling. Subhankar's wife feels pride in calling her husband a brave, honest and fearless cop. One night, he got a call from a hospital where a child was abandoned and the Doctor Rajat Das asked him to adopt that child. Subhankar learned that the child's father was a bandit and he refused to take the child but his wife encouraged him to take him and they should name him 'Ram'. Later, they threw a party and amidst that Subhankar received a phone call where he learned that a school headmaster has been murdered by Chadu, son of Police minister, Ranabir Choudhury, due to political events. Subhankar took warrant and went to arrest Chadu which Ranabir didn't like and told him to return but his wife had her son arrested to Subhankar.

On his son's arrest, Ranabir told his henchmen to kill Subhankar and they did. On funeral, Madhuri asked his elder son Ram to pledge before his father's dead body to take revenge against the culprits and also proclaimed that she would make his younger son a brave and fearless cop much higher than their father. One night, Ranabir told his henchmen to set Subhankar's house afire to eliminate the threat they posed. Ranabir's wife Meena saved them and told them to escape to Kolkata. They returned to Kolkata and lived in poverty.

Eventually, both Ram and Laxman grew up to be honest, brave and fearless. One struggled against injustice and the other became a policeman. Laxman falls in love with Pinky, Ranabir's daughter. On the other hand, Ram thrashed bad people due to his grudge against Ranabir Choudhury. He learnt that Ranabir Choudhury will attend a meeting at Darjeeling so, he went to kill him but Ranabir did not attend the meeting. Ram meets with Radha after saving her from a group of goons and falls in love with her.

He returned to Kolkata and he battled injustice yet again one of his friends loves a minister's daughter who was trying to marry his daughter to someone else. Ram protested that and removed her from the marriage hall. Ram and Radha developed a strong relationship. The minister Pratap Choudhury had a heated argument with Laxman upon his son-in-law's arrest for smuggling drugs and Ram threatened him to kill him if he does not restrain himself. Pratap Choudhury sent his henchmen to kill Laxman but the bullet only touched his left arm. Ram and Madhuri rushed to hospital and learned that Ram was not the biological son of Subhankar and Madhuri. Shocked to be a bandit's son he asked Madhuri to say why they used him since childhood and didn't prioritize his happiness and desires. Madhuri consoled him.

Angered Ram went to Pratap's house only to kill his entire family as he learnt that he was the main culprit. The police search for Ram, but he hides in Radha's house. Ranabir's henchmen go there to kill him but upon saving Ram, they kill Radha. Finally, Ram achieves vengeance on Ranabir and his son Chadu by shooting the same three bullets; one in Ranabir's left toe, second in his right one and lastly in the back but eventually succumbs to Laxman's bullet.

== Cast ==
- Prosenjit Chatterjee as Ram Sanyal, adopted son of Subhankar
- Anu Chowdhury as Radha, Ram's love interest
- Abdur Razzak as Subhankar Sanyal, an honest and upright police officer
- Tota Ray Chowdhury as Laxman Sanyal, biological son of Subhankar and Ram's younger brother
- Sandhya Roy as Madhuri Sanyal, mother of Ram and Laxman
- Debesh RayChowdhury as Police Minister Ranabir Chowdhury
- Mrinal Mukherjee as Pratap Chowdhury
- Anuradha Ray as Meena Chowdhury, Ranabir Chowdhury's wife
- Nisha Mukherjee as Pinky Chowdhury, Laxman's love interest
- Arun Banerjee as ACP Das
- Biswajit Chakraborty as Dr. Rajat Das, Subhankar's close friend and doctor
- Ashok Mukherjee as Headmaster
- Soma Dey as Headmaster's wife
- Kalyani Mondal as Hospital nurse
- Sumit Ganguly as Ranabir's henchman

== Soundtrack ==
Music of this film has been composed by Babul Bose.

=== Track listings ===
01. Ram Lakhan - Kumar Sanu and Alka Yagnik

02. Hajar Tarar Alor Majhe - Alka Yagnik

03. Dekhini Pahari Phool - Kumar Sanu

04. Tik Tik Ghorir Sathe - Udit Narayan and Shreya Ghoshal

05. Kauke Lagena Bhalo - Udit Narayan and Shreya Ghoshal

06. Tumi Ami Dujone - Kumar Sanu and Sadhana Sargam
