= Abhishek Chatterjee =

Indian actor (1964–2022)

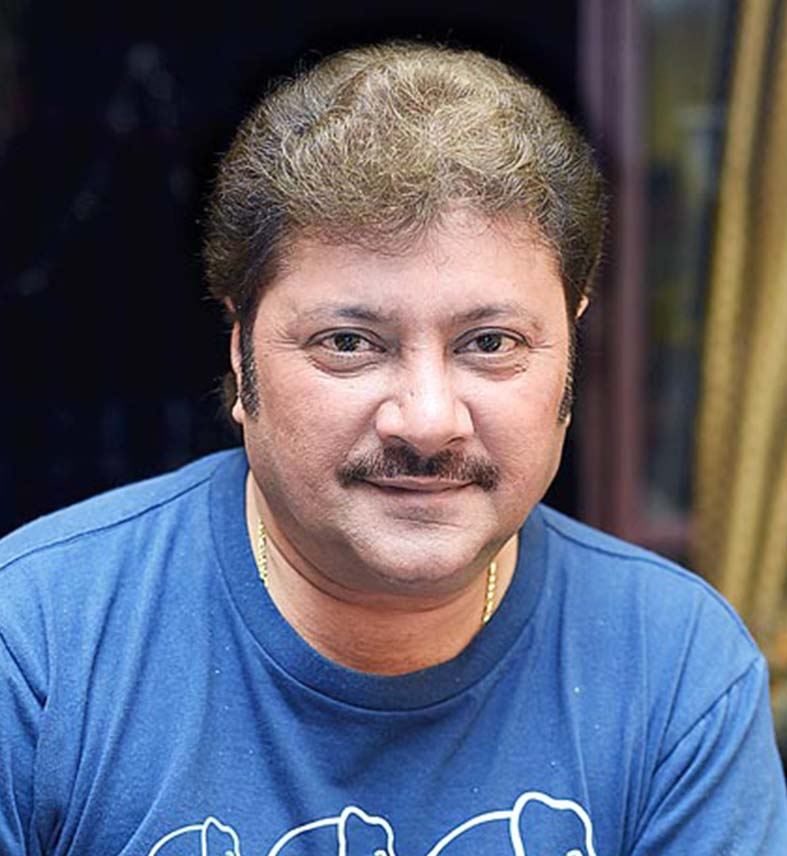
- Born: 30 April 1964; Kolkata, India
- Died: 24 March 2022 (aged 57); Kolkata, India
- Education: Baranagore Ramakrishna Mission Ashrama High School; Seth Anandram Jaipuria College
- Occupation: Actor
- Years active: 1986 – 2022
- Notable work: Lathi; Dahan; Bariwali; Alo
- Height: 5 ft 9 in (1.75 m)
- Spouse: Sanjukta Chatterjee (m. 2008)
- Children: Saina Chatterjee

Abhishek Chatterjee (30 April 1964 – 24 March 2022) was an Indian actor who was known for his work in Bengali cinema. He made his big screen debut alongside veterans such as Sandhya Roy, Prosenjit Chatterjee, Tapas Paul and Utpal Dutt with the Bengali film Pathbhola (1986) directed by Tarun Majumdar. His notable works include Lathi by Prabhat Roy, Bakul Priya By Swapan Saha, Pabitra Papi, Sajoni Aamar Sohag and Chaowa Pawa.

== Early life ==
He is the son of Bengali actor Prashanta Chatterjee. After finishing his secondary schooling at the Baranagore Ramakrishna Mission Ashrama High School, he graduated from the Seth Anandram Jaipuria College of the University of Calcutta.

== Death ==
Abhishek Chatterjee died at the age of 57, on 24 March 2022 from a cardiac arrest at his house in Kolkata.

== Filmography ==
- Pathbhola (1986) as Gupi
- Ora Charjon (1988)
- Aparadhi (1988)
- Tumi Koto Sundar (1988)
- Surer Akashe (1988)
- Toofan (1989)
- Maryada (1989)
- Amar Prem (1989)
- Papi (1990)
- Haraner Nat Jamai (1990)
- Jeevan Pradip (1991)
- Puroshottam (1992)
- Maa (1992) as Chandan Choudhury
- Baadshah (1992)
- Indrajit (1992) as Abhijit
- Natun Sansar (1992)
- Mayabini (1992)
- Pitrireen (1992)
- Daan Pratidaan (1993)
- Mayer Ashirbad (1993) as Bijoy
- Shakti (1993)
- Abbajan (1994)
- Geet Sangeet (1994)
- Rajar Raja (1994)
- Sarbojaya (1994)
- Phiriye Dao (1994) as Abhi
- Gajamukta (1994) as Abhishek
- Sangharsha (1995)
- Mejo Bou (1995)
- Sesh Pratiksha (1995)
- Protidhwani (1995)
- Abirvab (1995)
- Sujan Sakhi (1995); Remake of 1975 Bangladesh film Sujon Sokhi.
- Sakhi Tumi Kar (1996)
- Abujh Mon (1996)
- Lathi (1996)
- Bhai Amar Bhai (1996)
- Sinthir Sindoor (1996)
- Jamaibabu (1996) as Jayanta
- Adorer Bon (1997)
- Sabar Upare Maa (1997); Remake of 1994 Bangladesh film Judge Barrister.
- Matribhumi (1997)
- Saptami (1997)
- Ajker Santan (1997)
- Pabitra Papi (1997)
- Nishpap Asami (1997)
- Bakul Priya (1997)
- Mayar Badhon (1997) as Nirmal
- "Matir Manush" (1997)
- Dahan (Crossfire) (1997) as Palash
- Nayaner Alo (1998); Remake of 1984 Bangladesh film Noyoner Alo
- Baba Keno Chakor (1998); Remake of 1997 Bangladesh film Baba Keno Chakor.
- "Swamir Adesh" (1998)
- "Ami Sei Meye" (1998)
- Nag Nagini (1998)
- Putra Badhu (1998)
- Praner Cheye Priyo (1998)
- Gharer Laxmi (1998)
- Choudhury Paribar (1998)
- "Sagar Banya" (1998)
- Banglar Bodhu (1998)
- "Amar Maa" (1998)
- Yugabtar Lokenath (1998)
- Priyojon (1999)
- Sankha Sindurer Dibbi (1999) as Sajol
- Prem Priti Bhalobasha (1999) as Abhishek himself
- Jai Maa Durga (2000)
- Bariwali (The Lady of the House) (2000) as Abhijeet
- Madhur Milan (2000)
- Dabee (2000)
- Sajoni Aamar Sohag (2000) as Siddhartha
- Apon Holo Por (2000)
- Sreemati Bhayankari (2001)
- Etai Swargo (2001)
- Parinati (2001)
- Nishana (2002)
- Bangali Babu (2002)
- Mayer Anchal (2003)
- Arjun Aamar Naam (2003)
- Alo (2003)
- Sabuj Saathi (2003) as Rahul
- Sharbari (2003)
- Coolie (2004)
- Agni (2004)
- Arjun Aamar Naam (2004)
- Rajmohol (2005) as Sumit
- Dadar Adesh (2005) as Raj Chowdhury
- Swapno (2005)
- Shakal Sandhya (2006) as Sandip
- Janmadata (2008)
- Gharjamai (2008)
- Rajkumar (2008) as Rudra
- Chaowa Pawa (2009)
- Simanto Periye (2010) as Ajay
- Bhoy (2011)
- Ei Aronya (2011) as Bikram
- Antore Bahire (2012) as Mr. Das
- Misti Cheler Dustu Buddhi (2013)
- Atmogopon (2013) as Bijoy
- Honeymoon (2013)
- Prottabortan (2014)
- Aami Je Tomaar (2014)
- Chetana (2016)
- Ratri Shesher Tara (2017) as Uday
- Neer Khoje Pakhi (2017)
- Nilacholey Kiriti (2018)
- Chayamurti (2020)
- Baazi (2021) as Rudra Pratap Mukherjee
- Sleelatahanir Pore (2021)
- Sleeper Cell (2021)
- Nidhon (2021)

== Television ==
Year	Serial	Character	Channel	Production House
	Krishnakant Ka Vasiyatnama			
	Sanghaat		Zee Bangla	
2011 - 2013	Tapur Tupur	Ganesh a.k.a. Gana	Star Jalsha	Blues Productions
2012 - 2014	Aanchol		Star Jalsha	Blues Productions
2015	Chokher Tara Tui	Yuvoraj	Star Jalsha	Magic Moments Motion Pictures
2015 - 2016	Ichche Nodee	Ustad Rashid Ali	Star Jalsha	Magic Moments Motion Pictures
2016	Pita		Colors Bangla	
2017 - 2018	Andarmahal	Jubaraj Sengupta	Zee Bangla	Magic Moments Motion Pictures
2017	Kusum Dola	Diptoman Bose	Star Jalsha	Magic Moments Motion Pictures
2018	Phagun Bou	Chandrajit Bose	Star Jalsha	Magic Moments Motion Pictures
2019	Mayurpankhi	Nilambar Mitra	Star Jalsha	Magic Moments Motion Pictures
2019 - 2022	Mohor	Adideb Roy Choudhury	Star Jalsha	Magic Moments Motion Pictures
2020 - 2022	Khorkuto	Dr. Kaushik Bose	Star Jalsha	Magic Moments Motion Pictures
2022	Ismart Jodi Bangla (Season 1)	Himself	Star Jalsha	Greymind Communication Pvt Ltd
