= Debraj Roy =

Indian actor (1954–2024)

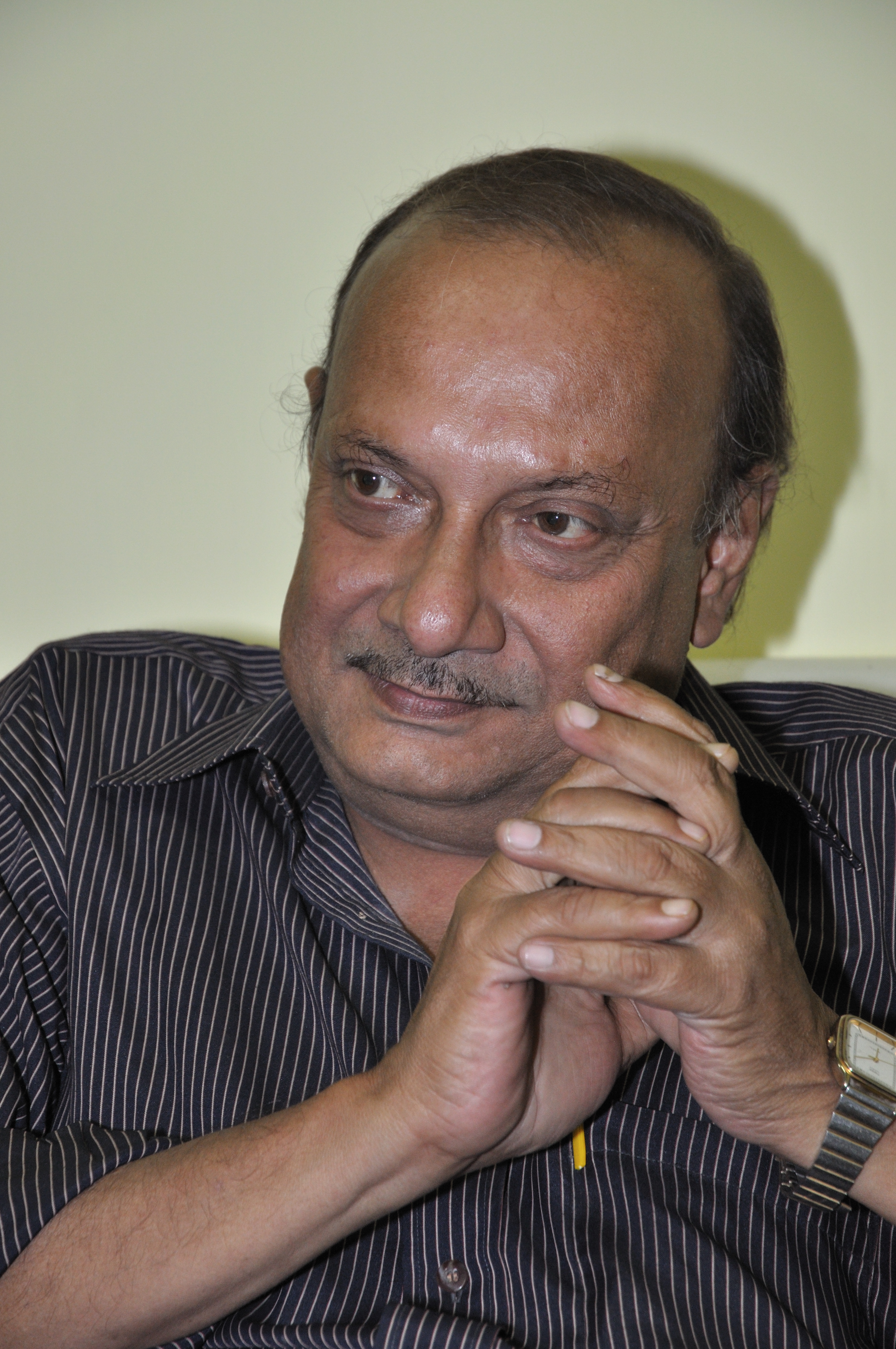
- Roy in 2010
- Born: 9 December 1954; Calcutta, West Bengal, India
- Died: 17 October 2024 (aged 69); Kolkata, West Bengal, India
- Occupation: Actor
- Known for: Pratidwandi; Calcutta 71; Marjina Abdulla; City of Joy
- Spouse: Anuradha Roy (m. 1976)

Debraj Roy (9 December 1954 – 17 October 2024) was an Indian actor who is known for his work in Bengali Doordarshan and Bengali cinema. He made his big screen debut with Satyajit Ray's Pratidwandi (1970) and grabbed wider attention for his memorable role in Mrinal Sen's Calcutta 71 (1971).

== Death ==
Debraj Roy died from multiple organ failure after suffering from serious illnesses for several months, at a private hospital in Kolkata, on 17 October 2024. He was 69.

== Filmography ==
- Bhoot Adbhoot (2014)
- Birodhi (2013)
- Chaap – The Pressure (2013)
- Ekti Muhurter Jonyo (2013)
- Panga Nibi Na Shala (2013)
- Kaal Madhumaas (2013)
- Honeymoon (2013)
- Aami Montri Hobo (2011)
- Dujone Milbo Abaar (2011)
- Kapurush Mahapurush (2011)
- Ashay Bhalobasay (2011)
- Run (2011)
- Preyashi (2010)
- Love Circus (2010)
- Smriti Katha Bole (2010)
- Jodi Kagoje Lekho Naam (2009)
- Raktanjali (2009)
- Moner Ajante (2009)
- Jekhane Ashray (2009)
- Shibaji (2008)
- Barodir Bramhachari Baba Lokenath (2007)
- Rudra The Fire (2007)
- Sri Ramkrishna Vivekananda (2007)
- Asha (2006)
- Til Theke Tal (2005)
- Mej Didi (2003)
- Inquilaab (2002)
- Aghat (2001)
- The Peacock Spring (1996)
- City of Joy (1992)
- Karoti (1988)
- Ganadevata (1978)
- Raja (1974)
- Marjina Abdulla (1973)
- Calcutta 71 (1971)
- Pratidwandi (1970)
