= Piya Sengupta =

Indian film actress

President of Eastern India Motion Picture Association
- Incumbent
- Assumed office 2018
- Preceded by: Krishna Narayan Daga
- Born: Piya Das; 9 June 1970 (age 55); Calcutta, West Bengal, India
- Occupations: Actress; Producer; Politician
- Years active: 1984–present
- Known for: Chore Chore Mastuto Bhai (2005)
- Political party: Trinamool Congress (2021–present)
- Spouse: Anup Sengupta
- Children: Bonny Sengupta (son)
- Parent: Sukhen Das (Father)

Piya Sengupta (née Das; born 9 June 1970) is an Indian actress, producer and politician. The daughter of Sukhen Das, she is known for her work in Bengali cinema. Since 2018, she has served as the President of Eastern India Motion Picture Association.

As an actress, she made her debut opposite Prosenjit Chatterjee in Sujit Guha's Dadamoni (1984). She rose to prominence for her role opposite Joy Banerjee in Milan Tithi (1985) directed by Sukhen Das. Even though the film was a massive success at the box office, she did not achieve any further significant feat in her career.

== Family and early life ==
Born on 9 June 1970, Sengupta is the daughter of Bengali actor and director Sukhen Das. She completed her schooling from Kamala Girls School, and then graduated from Jogamaya Devi College, Kolkata. She is married to Anup Sengupta. Bonny Sengupta is their son, who is also an actor.

== Political career ==
In 2021, she joined Trinamool Congress. She campaigned for party in the 2021 West Bengal Legislative Assembly election.

== Filmography ==
Year	Title	Producer	Note	Ref.
1984	Dadamoni			
1985	Milantithi			
1987	Paap Punya			
1990	Nyaydanda			
1998	Banglar Badhu			
1999	Santan			
2000	Sajoni Aamar Sohag			
2003	Mayer Anchal			
2004	Pratishodh			
2004	Paribar			
2005	Chore Chore Mastuto Bhai			
2005	Dadar Adesh	Yes		
2006	Abhimanyu			
2007	Mahaguru	Yes		
2009	Mama Bhagne			
2010	Pratidwandi			
2010	Tara			
2013	Prayoshchitto			
