= Anup Sengupta =

Indian film director

- Occupation: Director
- Children: Bonny Sengupta (son)

Anup Sengupta is a Bengali film director and producer. Actress Piya Sengupta is his wife and his son Bonny Sengupta is also an actor.

== Filmography ==
=== Director ===
- Jaanbaaz (2019)
- Bangla Banchao (2011)
- Pratidwandi (2010)
- Mama Bhagne (2010)
- Badla (2009)
- Ghar Jamai (2008)
- Mahaguru (2007)
- Chore Chore Mastuto Bhai (2005)
- Dadar Adesh (2005)
- Paribar (2004)
- Pratishodh (2004)
- Raja Babu (2004)
- Mayer Anchal (2003)
- Inquilaab (2002)
- Sonar Sansar (2002)
- Aghat (2001)
- Harjit (2000)
- Sajoni Aamar Sohag (2000)
- Shatruta (2000)
- Banglar Badhu (1998)
- Sindurer Adhikar (1998)
- Pabitra Papi (1997)
- Sinthir Sindur (1996)
- Pratidhwani (1995)
- Shubha Kamana (1991)
- Asha (1989)

=== Producer ===
- Ghar Jamai (2008)
- Mahaguru (2007)
- Dadar Adesh (2005)
- Paribar (2004)
