= Dipankar De =

Indian actor

Deepankar Dey
- Born: Deepankar Dey; 5 July 1944 (age 82)
- Occupation: Actor
- Spouse: Dolon Roy (m. 2020)
- Children: 2

Deepankar Dey is an Indian actor in the Bengali Film Industry. He has worked in movies as a Hero, Villain and Character Artist.

He starred in Satyajit Ray's Seemabaddha (1971), Jana Aranya (1976), Ganashatru (1990), Shakha Proshakha (1990) and Agantuk (The Stranger, 1991). He has acted in many art house and commercial films.

== Selected filmography ==
Year	Film	Director	Language
2025	Pataligunjer Putul Khela	Subhankar Chattopadhyay	
2024	Dabaru	Pathikrit Basu	Bengali
2024	Bijoyar Pore	Abhijit SriDas	Bengali
2020	Bhotbhoti	Tathagata Mukherjee	Bengali
2019	Ahaa Re	Ranjan Ghosh	Bengali
2018	Dotara		Bengali
2015	Har Har Byomkesh	Arindam Sil	Bengali
2015	Agantuker Pore	Orko Sinha	Bengali
2015	Sesh Anka	Tathagata Banerjee	Bengali
2014	Badshahi Angti	Sandip Ray	Bengali
2014	Youngistaan	Syed Ahmad Afzal	Hindi
2014	Highway		Bengali
2013	Arjun - Kalimpong E Sitaharan		Bengali
2012	Challenge 2	Raja Chanda	Bengali
2012	Hemlock Society	Srijit Mukherji	Bengali
2012	Chitrangada: The Crowning Wish	Rituparno Ghosh	Bengali
2012	Astra		Bengali
2010	Abohomaan	Rituparno Ghosh	Bengali
2009	Hasikhusi Club		Bengali
2008	Partner		Bengali
2008	Jor		Bengali
2007	Kailash Kelenkari	Sandip Ray	Bengali
2005	Sangram	Haranath Chakraborty	Bengali
2003	Mayer Anchal	Anup Sengupta	Bengali
2002	Titli	Rituparno Ghosh	Bengali
2000	Utsab	Rituparno Ghosh	Bengali
1997	Sedin Chaitramash		Bengali
1997	Unishe April	Rituparno Ghosh	Bengali
1998	Ranokhetro	Haranath Chakraborty	Bengali
1991	Agantuk	Satyajit Ray	Bengali
1990	Shakha Proshakha	Satyajit Ray	Bengali
1990	Ganashatru	Satyajit Ray	Bengali
1986	Amar Kantak	Sukhen Das	Bengali
1986	Shapmukti		Bengali
1988	Dena Paona	Sukhen Das	Bengali
1985	Parama	Aparna Sen	Bengali
1984	Mohonar Deeke	Biresh Chatterjee	Bengali
1982	Bodhon	Amal Dutta	Bengali
1981	Subarna Golak	Manu Sen	Bengali
1980	Akaler Shandhaney	Mrinal Sen	Bengali
1980	Banchharamer Bagan	Tapan Sinha	Bengali
1976	Jana Aranya	Satyajit Ray	Bengali
1971	Seemabaddha	Satyajit Ray	Bengali

== TV shows ==
Year	Title	Role	Language	Channel
2000– 2005	Ek Akasher Niche		Bengali	Zee Bangla
2009	Asambhab		Bengali	Zee Bangla
2010–2011	Gaaner Oparey	Chandrasekhar Deb	Bengali	Star Jalsha
2014– 2015	Thik Jeno Love Story	Ranjan Bose	Bengali	Star Jalsha
2016–2017	Jarowar Jhumko	Pannalal Roy	Bengali	Zee Bangla
2017–2018	Bhojo Gobindo	Pratap Narayan Chaudhury	Bengali	Star Jalsha
2018	Jai Kanhaiya Lal Ki	Janki Prasad Chaudhury	Hindi	Star Bharat
2019–2020	Kanak Kakon	Samyamoy Lahiri	Bengali	Colors Bangla
2020–2022	Jibon Saathi	Mollinath Banerjee	Bengali	Zee Bangla
2021–2022	Sarbojaya	Bogola	Bengali	Zee Bangla
2021–2022	Khukumoni Home Delivery	Ashutosh Deb	Bengali	Star Jalsha
2024–Present	Bodhua	Shyamsundar Chowdhury	Bengali	Star Jalsha

== Awards ==
- 1986 National Film Awards: Best Supporting Actor: Parama
