= Rachna Banerjee filmography =

Rachna Banerjee, also known mononymously as Rachana, is an Indian actress who has appeared predominantly in Bengali and Odia films along with several in Telugu, Tamil and Kannada languages. She was crowned 1991 Miss Kolkata and has won five beauty contests in India, notable being the Miss Beautiful Smile.

== Bengali films ==
Year	Title	Role	Notes	Ref.
1993	Dan Pratidan			
1993	Duranta Prem			
1993	Tapasya			
1994	Amodini	Amodini		
1995	Mohini			
1996	Mayer Katha			
1997	Danab			
1997	Jiban Sandhan			
1999	Pordeshi Babu			
1999	Haar Jeet	Shivani		
2002	Kurukshetra	Anjali		
2003	Rajasaheb			
2003	Shotrur Mokabila			
2003	Bhaiya		Bangladeshi film	
2003	Andha Prem			
2003	Guru	Rinky		
2003	Kartabya			
2003	Mayer Anchal	Rupa		
2003	Memsaheb			
2003	Rakta Bandhan			
2003	Sabuj Sathi	Sathi		
2003	Ora Dalal	Rani	Bangladeshi film	
2003	Sottyer Bijoy		Bangladeshi film	
2003	Sneher Protidaan			
2004	Agni			
2004	Annaye Atyachar			
2004	Dadu No. 1	Jyoti		
2004	Ek Chilte Sindur			
2004	Gyarakal			
2004	Manna Bhai			
2004	Paribar	Pakhi		
2004	Pratisodh			
2004	Tyaag	Anjali		
2004	Bhaiya			
2005	Bazi	Bobby		
2005	Debi			
2005	Rajmohol			
2005	Sakal Sandhya			
2005	Sathi Amar			
2005	Swamir Deoya Sindur			
2006	Agnishapath			
2006	Khalnayak			
2006	Swarthopor			
2006	Praner Swami		Official remake of Bangladeshi film Khairun Sundari	
2007	Tulkalam			
2008	Biyer Lagna		Was released in Bangladesh as Mayer Moto Bhabi	
2008	Janmadata	Sima		
2008	Mr Funtoosh			
2008	Ram Balaram			
2008	Takkar	Chaitali Chowdhury		
2009	Chaowa Pawa			
2009	Lakshyabhed			
2010	Maha Sati Sabitri			
2011	Moubane Aaj			
2011	Jay Baba Bholenath			
2013	Goyenda Gogol			
2014	Ramdhanu			
2015	Boudi.com			
2017	Hothat Ekdin			

== Odia films ==
Year	Film	Role	Ref.
1993	Kandhei Akhire Luha		
1993	Sei Jhiati		
1994	Bhai Hela Bhagari		
1994	Pathara Khasuchi Bada Deulu		
1994	Rupa Ga Re Suna Kuniya		
1994	Sagar Ganga		
1995	Subhadra		
1995	Sakhi Rahibo Mo Sankha Sindoor		
1995	Sakala Tirtha Tho Charane		
1996	Jashoda		
1996	Suhaga Sindura		
1996	Pua Mora Bhola Sankara	Geetha	
1996	Lakshman Rekha		
1996	Mo Kola To Jhulana		
1997	Ganga Jamuna		
1997	Lakshye Siba Puji Paichi Pua		
1997	Nari Bi Pindhipare Rakta Sindura	Rekha	
1998	Santana		
1998	Sahara Jaluchi		
1998	Pabitra Bandhan		
1998	Sindura Nuhein Khela Ghara		
1998	Suna Palinki		
1999	Rakhi Bhijigala Aakhi Luha Re		
1999	Paradesi Babu		
2000	Dharam Sahile Hela		
2000	Laxmi Pratima		
2000	Raja		
2000	Suna Harini		
2001	Nari Nuhen Tu Narayani		
2001	Mo Kola To Jhulana		
2001	Singha Bahini		
2002	Kalki Abatar		
2003	Sarapanch Babu		

== Telugu films ==
Year	Film	Role	Ref.
1997	Nenu Premisthunnanu	Rachana	
1998	Kanyadanam	Vandana	
1998	Raayudu	Lakshmi	
1998	Maavidakulu	Priya	
1998	Abhishekam	Surabhi	
1998	Bavagaru Bagunnara?	Sandhya	
1999	Pilla Nachindi	Lahari	
1999	Sultan	Renuka	
1999	Pedda Manushulu	Sravanti	
2000	Antha Mana Manchike	Urmila	
2001	Athanu	—	
2002	Neethone Vuntanu	Aparna	
2002	Lahiri Lahiri Lahirilo	Chandu	

== Tamil films ==
Year	Film	Role	Ref.
1996	Poovarasan	Kaveri	
1996	Tata Birla	Priya	
1997	Vaimaye Vellum	Meena	

== Kannada films ==
She starred two movies in Kannada language with actor Ravichandran.

Year	Film	Role	Ref.
2000	Preethsu Thappenilla	Anu	
2001	Usire	Chandri	

== Hindi films ==
Year	Film	Role	Note	Ref.
1999	Sooryavansham	Gauri		

== Bengali TV series ==
Year	TV series	Director	Co-actor	Note	Ref.
1993	Char Dewal			Based on the novel of the same name by Suchitra Bhattacharya	
