= Jisshu Sengupta filmography =

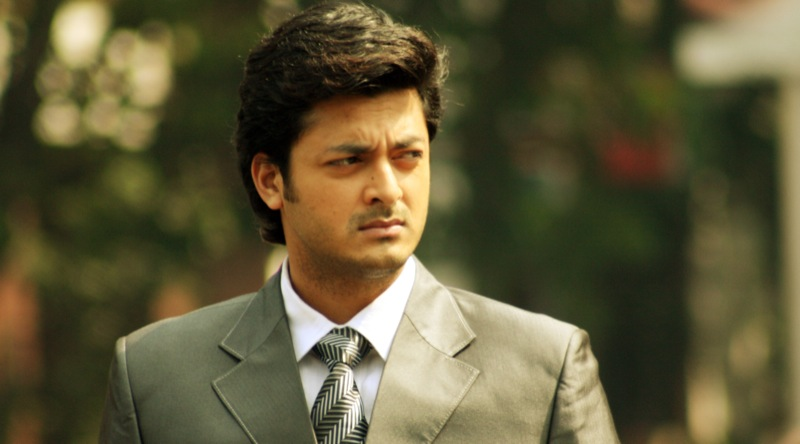
_{Sengupta in 2007}

Jisshu Sengupta is an Indian actor, producer, television presenter and anchor who predominantly works in Bengali, Telugu cinema, in addition to few Hindi and Kannada language films. Sengupta made his debut through a Bengali TV series, Mahaprabhu where he portrayed the role of Chaitanya Mahaprabhu; the role gained him much recognition. Subsequently, he made his film debut with Priyojon (1999), which became a debacle at the box office. In 2002, he played Tagore in Sukanta Roy's ambitious venture Chelebela alongside Debashree Roy playing Kadambari Devi. following which he appeared in a spate of critically and commercially unsuccessful projects. He made his Bollywood debut with Shyam Benegal's National Award winning film Netaji Subhas Chandra Bose: The Forgotten Hero (2004). A turning point came in his career when he collaborated with Rituparno Ghosh for the latter's Abohomaan, which earned him critical acclaim. His subsequent collaborations with Ghosh for films which include Noukadubi and Shob Charitro Kalponik brought him a higher degree of critical and commercial success. Sengupta's collaborations with other directors for films such as Jaatishwar, Ek Je Chhilo Raja, Posto enabled him to become one of the most sought out actors in Bengali cinema.

Sengupta continued to garner wider attention and further critical acclaim for the role of a contract killer in Rajkahini (2015) and a private detective in Byomkesh O Chiriyakhana (2016). His biggest commercial success came with the action drama Zulfiqar (2016), He continued to draw praise for his performances in Sesh Bole Kichu Nei (2014), Jaatishwar (2014) and Arshinagar (2015). In 2019, he debuted in Telegu cinema with NTR: Kathanayakudu . He has also acted in a number of Hindi and Telegu films like Manikarnika, Antim: The Final Truth, Shyam Singha Roy and Sita Ramam.

Apart from films, Sengupta is actively involved in anchoring reality shows and award shows, including Filmfare Awards East (2017). In 2011, he made a comeback on television in the fiction category through Aparajito, which he produced for Star Jalsha.

== Films ==
Key
†	Denotes films that have not yet been released

- All films are in Indian Bengali-language, unless otherwise noted.

List of Jisshu Sengupta film credits
Year	Title	Role(s)	Notes	Ref.
1999	Priyojon			
2000	Shesh Thikana			
2000	Rinmukti			
2001	Ektu Choya			
2002	Chelebela	Rabindranath Tagore		
2002	Devdas	Paro's Son		
2002	Mr. and Mrs. Iyer	Akaash	English film	
2002	Kurukshetra	Sagar Chowdhury		
2003	Sneher Protidan	Sagar		
2003	Abar Aranye	Jisshu		
2003	Moner Majhe Tumi	Arun	Bangladeshi film; Indo-Bangladesh joint production	
2003	Guru	Jeet		
2004	Anyay Atyachar	Raja		
2004	Premi	Sumit		
2004	Gaindakol	Dablu		
2004	Sajani	Rahul		
2004	Rajababu	Sundar		
2005	Sangram	Somu		
2005	Debi			
2005	Netaji Subhas Chandra Bose: The Forgotten Hero	Sisir Kumar Bose	Hindi film	
2005	Chore Chore Mastuto Bhai	Rahul		
2005	Shudhu Bhalobasha			
2006	Swarthopor	Arnab		
2006	Swapno	Sujoy		
2006	Abhimanyu	Ajit Ghosh		
2006	Tapasya			
2006	Hungama	Bijoy		
2006	Aamra	Amit Roy		
2007	Shapmochan			
2007	Kali Shankar	SP Vikram		
2007	The Last Lear	Goutam	English film	
2008	Janmadata	Raj Sinha		
2008	Premer Kahini	Major Gautam		
2008	Golmaal	Siddharth		
2008	90 Ghanta	Rishi		
2008	Ek Nadir Galpo: Tale of a River			
2008	Love	Rahul		
2008	Bor Asbe Ekhuni	Abhi		
2009	Neel Akasher Chandni	Neel		
2009	Shob Charitro Kalponik	Shekhar		
2010	Abohomaan	Apratim		
2010	Kokhono Biday Bolona			
2010	Arekti Premer Golpo	Uday / Tushar		
2011	Noukadubi	Ramesh		
2011	Takhan Teish	Tamodeep		
2012	Chitrangada: The Crowning Wish	Partho, the percussionist		
2012	Barfi!	Ranjit Sengupta	Hindi film	
2013	Golemale Pirit Koro Na	Anil Sen		
2014	Mardaani	Dr. Bikram Roy	Hindi film	
2014	Jaatishwar	Rohit Mehta		
2014	Sesh Bole Kicchu Nei	Andy		
2015	Piku	Syed Afroz	Hindi film	
2015	Nirbaak	Amit Sengupta		
2015	Byomkesh Bakshi	Byomkesh Bakshi		
2015	Rajkahini	Kabir		
2015	Arshinagar	Tayyab		
2016	Kelor Kirti	Joy		
2016	Zulfiqar	Kashinath Kundu		
2016	Byomkesh O Chiriyakhana	Byomkesh Bakshi		
2016	Hemanta	Hirak		
2017	The Bongs Again	Jisshu		
2017	Aranyadeb	Aranya		
2017	Posto	Arnab Lahiri		
2017	Yeti Obhijaan	Jung Bahadur Rana		
2017	Byomkesh O Agnibaan	Byomkesh Bakshi		
2017	Jio Pagla	Ananta Sen		
2018	Ghare & Baire	Amit Roy		
2018	Amoli	Narrator	Documentary film	
2018	Uma	Himadri Sen		
2018	Shonar Pahar	Soumya Mukherjee		
2018	Ek Je Chhilo Raja	Raja Mahendra Kumar Chowdhury		
2019	NTR: Kathanayakudu	L. V. Prasad	Telugu film	
2019	Manikarnika	Gangadhar Rao Newalkar	Hindi film	
2019	Mardaani 2	Dr. Bikram Roy	Hindi film	
2019	Mukhomukhi			
2019	Basu Poribar	Raja		
2019	Mahalaya	Uttam Kumar		
2019	Bornoporichoy	Dhananjoy		
2019	Ghawre Bairey Aaj	Sandip Jha		
2020	Shironam			
2020	Aswathama	Dr. Manoj Kumar	Telugu film	
2020	Bheeshma	Raghavan	Telugu film	
2020	Shakuntala Devi	Paritosh Banerji	Hindi film	
2020	Sadak 2	Yogesh Desai	Hindi film	
2020	Durgamati	ACP Abhay Singh	Hindi film	
2021	The Power	Ramdas Thakur	Hindi film	
2021	Antim: The Final Truth	Pitya Bagare	Hindi film	
2021	Maestro	CI N. Ravindar / Bobby	Telugu film	
2021	Shyam Singha Roy	Debendra Singha Roy	Telugu film	
2022	Baba Baby O	Megh Roddur Chatterjee		
2022	Abhijaan	Soumitra Chattopadhyay	Filmfare Award Bangla Best Actor (Critics)	
2022	Acharya	Rathod	Telugu film	
2022	Sita Ramam	Nawab, Princess Noor Jahan's brother	Telugu film	
2023	Shaakuntalam	Indra Deva	Telugu film	
2023	Spy	Abdur Rahman	Telugu film	
2023	Palaan	Jisshu Sen		
2023	Dawshom Awbotaar	Biswarup Bardhan		
2023	Tiger Nageswara Rao	CI Mouli	Telugu film	
2024	Saindhav	Michael	Telugu film	
2024	Prathinidhi 2	CBI Officer Vikram Santhosh	Telugu film	
2024	Viswam	Jalaluddin Qureshi	Telugu film	
2024	Lantrani	A Gay Man	Hindi film	
2024	Blackout	Detective Arvind Dasgupta	Hindi film	
2024	Mirza: Part 1 – Joker	Tiger Bhai		
2024	Khadaan	Mohan Das		
2025	Borbaad	Muhammad "Farhan" Khan	Bangladeshi film	
2025	Ghaati	Mahaveer Mandhani	Telugu film	
2025	Lawho Gouranger Naam Rey	Nityananda	Special appearance	
2026	Mardaani 3	Dr. Bikram Roy	Hindi film	
2026	Bhooth Bangla	Dr. Vasudev Acharya	Hindi film	
2026	Abhhiman	Rishi Chatterjee		
2026	Bohurupi: The Golden Daku	IC Ayan Banerjee		
2027	G2†	Capt. Nagappa	Telugu film	
2027	King 100†	TBA	Telugu film	
2027	Maharagni: Queen of Queens†	TBA	Hindi film	
2028	RK x KH reunion film†	TBA	Tamil film	

== Television ==
List of Jisshu Sengupta television credits
Year	Title	Role(s)	Language	Network	Notes	Ref.
1998	Mahaprabhu	Chaitanya Mahaprabhu	Bengali			
	Rupkatha		Bengali			
	Hiyar Majhe		Bengali			
	Pratibimbo		Bengali			
2011–2012	Aparajito		Bengali	Star Jalsha		
2013–2015	Tomay Amay Mile		Bengali	Star Jalsha		
2016	Bhalobasha Bhalobasha		Bengali	Star Jalsha		
2019	Skyfire	Harshvardhan Dharma	Hindi	ZEE5		
2019	Typewriter	Amit Roy	Hindi	Netflix		
2020	Criminal Justice: Behind closed doors	Vikram Chandra	Hindi	Disney+ Hotstar		
2022–present	Horogouri Pice Hotel		Bengali	Star Jalsha	Producer	
2023–2024	Love Biye Aaj Kal		Bengali	Star Jalsha	Producer	
2023	The Trial	Rajeev Sengupta	Hindi	Disney+ Hotstar		
2023	P I Meena	Dr. Andrew Rakhaw	Hindi	Amazon Prime Video		
2024	Dabba Cartel	Shankar Dasgupta	Hindi	Netflix		
2025	Dance Bangla Dance	Judge	Bengali	Zee Bangla	Season 13	
2026	Brown		Hindi	Zee5		
