= List of songs recorded by Kavita Krishnamurti in South Indian languages =

The following is the list of songs recorded by singer Kavita Krishnamurthy in South-Indian languages such as Kannada, Tamil, Telugu and Malayalam.

== Kannada songs ==
Kavita started her singing career from the Kannada film industry. Kavita made her Kannada debut through the film "Ondanondu Kaladalli" in 1978. She also created an impact in the mind of audiences in Karnataka with her soul-stirring voice, which she has rendered in many blockbuster films like H2O, Deadly Soma and Raja Huli. She has worked with notable composers like Gurukiran, Sadhu Kokila, Rajesh Ramanath and Hamsalekha.

=== Film songs ===
Year	Song	Film	Music director	Co-singer(s)
1978	"Ondanondu Kaladaga"	Ondanondu Kaladalli	Bhaskar Chandavarkar	Solo
2000	"O Malle O Dumbi"	Naga Devathe	Hamsalekha	Solo
2000	"Bareyada Mounada Kavithe"	Sparsha	Hamsalekha	Pankaj Udhas, Archana Udupa
2000	"Kanasali Kaaduva Hudugi"	Sparsha	Hamsalekha	Sonu Nigam
2001	"Yavvi Yavvi"	Baava Baamaida	Hamsalekha	S. P. Balasubrahmanyam
2002	"O Harusha"	Love You	Gurukiran	Shankar Mahadevan
2002	"Kaathura Manapoora"	Thuntata	Gurukiran	Udit Narayan
2002	"Hoove Hoove"	H2O	Sadhu Kokila	Solo
2003	"Jo Laali"	Laali Haadu	Sadhu Kokila	Solo
2003	"Prema Bana"	Shriram	Gurukiran	Suresh Wadkar
2003	"Kogile Kuhu Kuhu"	Badri	Rajesh Ramanath	Solo
2003	"Bannada Lokada hoovugale"	Badri	Rajesh Ramanath	Rajesh Krishnan
2003	"Endo Kanda Kanasu"	Lankesh Patrike	Babji-Sandeep	Rajesh Krishnan
2003	"Idu yaavudu yaavudu"	Vijaya Simha	Babji-Sandeep	Hariharan
2003	"Oho Priyatama"	Vijaya Simha	Babji-Sandeep	Hariharan
2003	"Hrudayada Olage"	Kariya	Gurukiran	S. P. Balasubrahmanyam
2004	"Bhalo Bhashi Bengalili"	Omkara	Gurukiran	Hariharan
2004	"Nanna Beladingalu"	Joke Falls	Mano Murthy	Solo
2004	"Bala Gopalana"	Kadamba	Deva	Solo
2004	"Yelle Irali Hege Irali"	Kadamba	Deva	Solo
2005	"Hey Hasivendarenu"	Deadly Soma	Sadhu Kokila	Unni Krishnan
2005	"Allola Kallola"	Namma Basava	Gurukiran	
2005	"Elli cheluvide"	Nanna Kanasina Hoove	N. S. Prasad	Solo
2006	"Ranga Ranga"	Mohini 9886788888	Hamsalekha	Udit Narayan
2006	"Artha Madkolo"	Sishya	V. Nagendra Prasad	Solo
2006	"Love Moodinalli"	Miss California	Ravi Dattatreya	Ram Prasad
2009	"Preethiya Baa Nee Nanagagi"	Black	C. R. Bobby	Solo
2011	"Chaitrada Maasavu"	Taare	C. R. Bobby	
2011	"Usirane Neene"	Hero Naanalla	Raju Upendrakumar	Solo
2013	"Kaveri Kaveri"	Raja Huli	Hamsalekha	Solo
2016	"Guruvandane"	Nanna Ninna Prema Kathe	Shivu Jamkhandi	Solo

=== Non-film Kannada songs ===
Kavita has recorded Purandara Dasa's classical Kannada songs in Karnataka Sangeetha style.

Year	Song	Album	Music director	Co-singer(s)
2004	"Thoogire Rangana"	Krishna Nee Begane Baaro	Jayashree Aravind	Solo
2004	"Koosanu Kandeera"	Krishna Nee Begane Baaro	Jayashree Aravind	Solo
2004	"Ena Maadalo"	Krishna Nee Begane Baaro	Jayashree Aravind	Solo
2015	"Kanda Haalu Kudiyo"	Indu Engage Govinda	Shrinivas Avinash	Solo
2015	"Aavanam Poojisali"	Indu Engage Govinda	Shrinivas Avinash	Solo
2015	"Higguvi Yaathako"	Indu Engage Govinda	Shrinivas Avinash	Solo
2015	"Kelano Hari Thaalano"	Indu Engage Govinda	Shrinivas Avinash	Solo
2015	"Baaro Namma Manege"	Indu Engage Govinda	Shrinivas Avinash	Solo
2015	"Ninna Nodi Dhanyanadenu"	Indu Engage Govinda	Shrinivas Avinash	Solo
2015	"Indu Enage Shri Govinda"	Indu Engage Govinda	Shrinivas Avinash	Solo
2015	"Gajavadana Beduve"	Indu Engage Govinda	Shrinivas Avinash	Solo

== Tamil songs ==
Film songs

Kavita made her Tamil debut through the film "Ulagam Pirandhadhu Enakkaga" in the year 1990. She worked with notable composers like illaiyaraja, A.R. Rahman, Deva, Harris jeyaraj, Dhina.

Year	Movie	Song title	Music director	Co-singers
1990	Ulagam Pirandhadhu Enakkaga	"Adada Vayasupulla"	R. D. Burman	S. P. Balasubrahmanyam
1993	Uzhaipaali	"Muthirai Ippodhu"	Ilaiyaraja	S. P. Balasubrahmanyam
1994	Veera Padhakkam	"Indha Maanai"	Deva	Solo
1995	Ragasiya Police	"Yen Yen"	Laxmikant–Pyarelal	S. P. Balasubrahmanyam
1995	Ragasiya Police	"Manmadhan"	Laxmikant–Pyarelal	K. S. Chithra
1995	Ragasiya Police	"Echangatru"	Laxmikant–Pyarelal	Solo
1995	Rangeela	"Kadhale"	A. R. Rahman	Unni Krishnan
1997	Devathai	"Naal Thorum"	Ilaiyaraja	
1997	Sakthi	"Sakthi Sakthi"	R. Anandh	Solo
1999	Taalam	"Kadhal Illamale"	A. R. Rahman	
1999	Mudhalvan	"Uppu Karuvaadu"	A. R. Rahman	Shankar Mahadevan
1999	Kadhalar Dhinam	"Daandiyaa Aattamumaada"	A. R. Rahman	Unni Menon, M. G. Sreekumar
2000	Rhythm	"Kaatre En Vaasal"	A. R. Rahman	Unni Krishnan
2001	Majunu	"Pada Pada Pattamboochi"	Harris Jayaraj	Shankar Mahadevan
2001	Ashoka	"Adiye Aatthi"	Anu Malik	Shaan
2001	Shahjahan	"Achacho Punnagai"	Mani Sharma	Udit Narayan
2002	Alaudin	"Yendi Yennai"	Mani Sharma	Ranjith
2011	Seedan	"Yaadhumaagiye"	Dhina	Shankar Mahadevan

Serial songs

Year	Film	Song title	Music director	Co-singers
2001	Alaigal	"Sutrum Bhoomi"	Dhina	Palakkad Sreeam

== Telugu songs ==
She often worked with Mani Sharma and has rendered her voice to actresses like Aishwarya Rai, Simran Bagga and Trisha Krishnan.

Year	Movie	Song title	Music director	Co-singers
1990	Neti Siddhartha	"Nuvve Katha"	Laxmikant–Pyarelal	S. P. Balasubrahmanyam
1990	Neti Siddhartha	"Prema Katha"	Laxmikant–Pyarelal	S. P. Balasubrahmanyam
1990	Neti Siddhartha	"Chumma Kotti"	Laxmikant–Pyarelal	S. P. Balasubrahmanyam
1991	Brahmarshi Vishwamitra	"Ee Chinnadi Muddula"	Ravindra Jain	P. Susheela
1992	Antham	"Oohalevo Regey"	R. D. Burman	Mano
1995	Rangeli	"Emito Emo Ee Prema"	A. R. Rahman	Hariharan
1996	Tata Manavadu	"Magamasam Muhurtham"	Madhavapeddi Suresh	S. P. Balasubrahmanyam
1996	Tata Manavadu	"Nee Cheera Kattudu"	Madhavapeddi Suresh	S. P. Balasubrahmanyam
1998	Choodalani Vundi	"Oh Mariya Oh Mariya"	Mani Sharma	Shankar Mahadevan
1999	Sneham Kosam	"Kaikaluri Kannepilla"	S. A. Rajkumar	Udit Narayan
1999	Raja Kumarudu	"Godari Gattupaina"	Mani Sharma	Udit Narayan
1999	Ravoyi Chandamama	"Love To Live"	Mani Sharma	Sonu Nigam
1999	Premikula Roju	"Dhaandiya"	A. R. Rahman	Unni Menon, M. G. Sreekumar
1999	Oke Okkadu	"Uttimeeda Koodu"	A. R. Rahman	Shankar Mahadevan
2000	Rhythm	"Gaale Naa Vakitakoche"	A. R. Rahman	P. Unnikrishnan
2000	Jayam Manade Raa	"Pelliki Baja"	Vandemataram Srinivas	S. P. Balasubrahmanyam
2001	Bhadrachalam	"Cheneta Cheera Katti"	Vandemataram Srinivas	Jaspinder Narula
2001	Daddy	"Mandara Buggaloki"	S. A. Rajkumar	Udit Narayan
2001	Daddy	"Patta Pakkinti"	S. A. Rajkumar	S. P. Balasubrahmanyam, Anuradha Sriram
2001	Prematho Raa	"Babu Bathayi"	Mani Sharma	S. P. Balasubrahmanyam
2001	Bhalevadivi Basu	"Kukuku Ante"	Mani Sharma	S. P. Balasubrahmanyam
2001	Narasimha Naidu	"Ninne Kuttesinaadi"	Mani Sharma	Hariharan
2001	Kushi	"Ammaye"	Mani Sharma	Udit Narayan
2001	Chirujallu	"Kalallo Nuvve"	Vandemataram Srinivas	Udit Narayan
2001	Tholi Valapu	"Nandanam Vandanam"	Vandemataram Srinivas	Kumar Sanu
2001	Subbu	"Naa Kosame"	Mani Sharma	M. M. Keeravani
2002	Holi	"Aadapillalu Are Ledipillalu"	R. P. Patnaik	Kay Kay
2002	Seema Simham	"Koka Raika"	Mani Sharma	S. P. Balasubrahmanyam
2002	Priyanesthama	"Vennelalo Thiragali"	Bharani	Sonu Nigam
2002	Neethone Untaanu	"Handsome"	Vandemataram Srinivas	Solo
2003	Vishnu	"Okasaari"	Ismail Darbar	Udit Narayan
2003	Vishnu	"Nelluri Nerajana"	Ismail Darbar	Kay Kay
2004	Intlo Srimathi Veedhilo Kumari	"Bhama Neetho"	Ghantadi Krishna	Udit Narayan
2004	Sunday	"Gundela Maatuna"	Sri Sunil Dharma	Kumar Sanu
2004	Valliddaru Okkate	"O Priya"	Vandemataram Srinivas	Udit Narayan
2005	Athadu	"Pilichina"	Mani Sharma	Karthik
2005	Soggadu	"Kokkorokko"	Chakri	Tippu
2005	Ekkadikelthundo Manasu	"Missu Kavala"	Rajdeep	Chorus
2006	Sainikudu	"Maayera"	Harris Jayaraj	S. P. Balasubrahmanyam, Unni Krishnan
2013	Jagadguru Adi Shankara	"Kamadeva"	Nag Sri vatsav	Srinivas

== Malayalam songs ==
Year	Song title	Movie	Music director	Co-singers
2004	"Adimaha Manasin"	Ee Snehatheerathu	L. Subramaniam	M. G. Sreekumar
2004	"Siva Siva"	Ee Snehatheerathu	L. Subramaniam	M. G. Sreekumar
2004	"Sada Manathil Vaazhum"	Ee Snehatheerathu	L. Subramaniam	Solo
2004	"Udhayarkka Kiranangal"	Ee Snehatheerathu	L. Subramaniam	Solo

== Bengali songs ==
Year	Film	Song	Composer(s)	Co-artist(s)
1988	Surer Akashe	"Hothat Amay Fele"	Sapan Chakraborty	
1989	Amar Prem	"Na Ar Amake"	Bappi Lahiri	
1989	Aamar Tumi	"Bhalo Bashi"	Bappi Lahiri	Amit Kumar
1989	Asha O Bhalobasha	"O Pahar"(Female)	Bappi Lahiri	
1989	Bidhira Bidhan	"Bou Shudu Dhei"	Akshaya Mohanty	
1989	Bidhira Bidhan	"Maa Tomar Sinthi"	Akshaya Mohanty	Chandrani Mukherjee
1989	Chokher Aloy	"Oi Shono"(Female)	Bappi Lahiri	
1989	Mandanda	"Ektu Porei Ei Ratri Seshe"	Sapan Chakraborty	Amit Kumar
1989	Maryada	"Pathe Jete Jete"	Babul Bose	
1989	Mone Mone	"Mono Mono Aajo Sei"	Kanu Bhattacharya	Bhupendar Singh
1989	Pronami Tomal	"Sakal Hote Na Hote"	Bappi Lahiri	Md Aziz
1989	Toofan	"Basbo Bhalo"	Sapan Chakraborty	Shakti Takur, Haimanti
1990	Bhangagara	"Akhuni Shamuhdhoze"	Ravindra Jain	Md Aziz
1990	Debata	"Bochor Ghure Elo"	R. D. Burman	Asha Bhosle, Amit Kumar, Shailendra Singh
1990	Mahajan	"Tuki Tuki Tuki"	Swapan Chakraborty	Arpita
1990	Qaidi	"Jaar Ektu Haanshi Te"(Sad)	Anu Malik	Md Aziz
1991	Ahankar	"Pagri Kothai"	R. D. Burman	
1991	Antarer Bhalobasha	"Hole Minya Bibi"	Bappi Lahiri	
1991	Antarer Bhalobasha	"Ei To Ami Eshe"	Bappi Lahiri	
1991	Bidhilipi	"Kije Kori Hayre"	Sapan Chakraborty	
1991	Bourani	"Kande Kende Bole"	R. D. Burman	Amit Kumar
1991	Ek Pashla Bristi	"Ami Thaki Uttare"	Rocket Mondal	Amit Kumar
1991	Katha Dilam	"Maake Je Bhoy"	Ajoy Das	
1991	Katha Dilam	"Iam Romio"	Ajoy Das	Amit Kumar
1991	Pati Param Guru	"Swapne Swapne"	Ravindra Jain	
1991	Sadharan Meye	"Aabar Aami Natun Kore"	Kanu Bhattacharya	Amit Kumar
1991	Shubha Kamana	"Asche Holly Re"	Ajoy Das	Kumar Sanu
1991	Shubha Kamana	"Sundarirag Kare"	Ajoy Das	Kumar Sanu
1992	Ananya	"Jemon Aaj Jakhon"	Ravindra Jain	Kumar Sanu
1992	Anutap	"Bodhay Temon"	Bappi Lahiri	Kumar Sanu
1992	Apon Par	"Choke Choke Je Katha"	Bappi Lahiri	Kumar Sanu
1992	Bahadhur	"Bhabini To Amar"	Kankan Dasgupta	
1992	Bahadhur	"Bahadur Bahadur"	Kankan Dasgupta	
1992	Bahadhur	"Sure Sure Mishey"	Kankan Dasgupta	Usha Uthap
1992	Daan Pratidaan	"Bhabini To Ami"	Ajoy Das	
1992	Gunjan	"Amake Dharo Apan Karo"	Kishore Desai	
1992	Gunjan	"Ekdin Konodin Ei Din Bhabini"	Kishore Desai	Kumar Sanu
1992	Maa	"Jar Parashe Jiban Juray"	R. D. Burman	
1992	Mayabini	"Ei Jivanta Jeno"	Tanmoy Chattaoadhoy	
1992	Natun Sansar	"Tumi Bolo Na Kothaye"	Samir Mukherjee	Kumar Sanu
1992	Pratham Dekha	"Duti Mon Jakhoni"(Female)	Arpita Raj	
1992	Pratham Dekha	"Aaj Tumi Bina"	Arpita Raj	
1992	Pratham Dekha	"Tumi Je Amari"	Arpita Raj	Kumar Sanu
1992	Pratham Dekha	"Ei Mon Ei Prem"	Arpita Raj	
1992	Priya	"Pasa Pasi Bari Ache"	Bappi Lahiri	Abijeet Bhattacharya
1992	Rakta Lekha	"Ami Kolkatar Roshogolla"	Bappi Lahiri	
1992	Shet Patharer Thala	"Bhalobasi Bhalobasi"	R. D. Burman	
1993	Anubhav	"Karuna Sagar Tumi"	Kanu Bhattacharya	
1993	Duranta Prem	"Bristi Name Bristi"	Arup Pranay	
1993	Duranta Prem	"Tomar Thont"	Arup Pranay	Kumar Sanu
1993	Duranta Prem	"Prajapati Keno"	Arup Pranay	Kumar Sanu
1993	Ghar Sansar	"Tumi Chole Gele"	Bappi Lahiri	
1993	Ghar Sansar	"O Amay Chou Tumi"	Bappi Lahiri	
1993	Maya Mamata	"Mamata Meri Jaan"	Gautam Bose	Kumar Sanu
1993	Maya Mamata	"Mayar Bandhan"	Gautam Bose	
1993	Prajapati	"Eso Eso Ghumer"	Mrinal Banerjee	
1993	Premi	"Ki Kore Chhilam"	Joydeb Sen	Kumar Sanu
1993	Shakti	"Ai Alo To Amer"	Nayan Majumdar	Kumar Sanu
1993	Shakti	"Tomar Kache"	Nayan Majumdar	Kumar Sanu
1993	Shanka	"Aaj Ke Aamar"	Shyamal Banerjee	Kumar Sanu
1993	Shanka	"O Priyo Ami Je"	Shyamal Banerjee	Shyamal Banerjee
1993	Shradhanjali	"Bongodeshe Anka Koshe"	R. D. Burman	
1993	Sukher Swarga	"Sei Pratham"	Ajoy Das	Suresh Wadkar
1993	Sukher Swarga	"Shono Boli"(Female)	Ajoy Das	Suresh Wadkar
1993	Tomar Rakte Amar Sohag	"Dol Dol Daluni"	Bappi Lahiri	Udit Narayan
1993	Tomar Rakte Amar Sohag	"Lal Tuk Tuk"	Bappi Lahiri	Abijeet Bhattacharya
1993	Tomar Rakte Amar Sohag	"Tomar Rakte"	Bappi Lahiri	
1993	Tomar Rakte Amar Sohag	"Dub Dub Duburi"	Bappi Lahiri	
1994	Kaal Purush	"Suno Suno Kaan Pate"	Kanu Bhattacharya	Kumar Sanu
1994	Kaal Purush	"Ghum Ase Na Ei Raate"	Kanu Bhattacharya	
1994	Kotha Chilo	"Haariye Jabo"	Bappi Lahiri	
1994	Kotha Chilo	"Aami Tomar"	Bappi Lahiri	
1994	Lal Pan Bibi	"Chhayake Jayna"	Bappi Lahiri	
1994	Lal Pan Bibi	"Premero Aaynate"	Bappi Lahiri	Kumar Sanu
1994	Lal Pan Bibi	"O Dadu Samle"	Bappi Lahiri	
1994	Lal Pan Bibi	"Sonar Pate Gaan"	Bappi Lahiri	
1994	Phiriye Dao	"Monje Kake Chay"	Bappi Lahiri	
1994	Rajar Raja	"Aakash Tarai Tarai"	Samit Bhanja, Subir Karanjai	
1994	Rakta Nadir Dhara	"Oye Komo Ba"	Bappi Lahiri	Md Aziz, Bappi Lahiri
1994	Rakta Nadir Dhara	"Tomar Buke"	Bappi Lahiri	
1994	Sagar	"Bondhu Amar"	Mrinal Benerjee	Udit Narayan
1994	Tobu Mone Rekho	"Tomar Hatey"	Rocket Mondal	Arun Sen
1994	Tobu Mone Rekho	"Miloner Raatey"	Rocket Mondal	Kumar Sanu
1995	Abirbhab	"Ei Mon Diyechi"	Ajoy Das	Amit Kumar
1995	Antaratama	"Ami Tomake"	Swapan Chakraborty	Kumar Sanu
1995	Antaratama	"Rock And Roll"	Swapan Chakraborty	Kumar Sanu, Abhijeet
1995	Antaratama	"Sab Katha Ki Mukhi"	Swapan Chakraborty	
1995	Jeevan Yoddha	"Janla Bondo"	Samir Mukherjee	
1995	Rakhal Raja	"Chara Gache"	Ashok Bhadra	
1995	Sangharsha	"Uttorpara Dakhinpara"	Bappi Lahiri	Md Aziz, Kumar Sanu
1995	Sansar Sangram	"Kader Gharer"	Anupam Dutta	Udit Narayan
1995	Sansar Sangram	"Faguner Gaan"(Female)	Anupam Dutta	
1995	Sansar Sangram	"Sorry Sir Namoshkar"	Anupam Dutta	Udit Narayan
1995	Sesh Pratiksha	"Kichu Keno"	Anupam Dutta	
1995	Sesh Pratiksha	"Ami Janmo Janmo"	Anupam Dutta	Kumar Sanu
1996	Aparajita	"Aaj Noy Kono"(Female)	Ajoy Das	
1996	Aparajita	"Gaan Nor E Amar"	Ajoy Das	
1996	Aparajita	"Uru Uru Uru Ei"	Ajoy Das	
1996	Beadap	"Uthti Boyos Meye Ami"	Sapan Jagmohan	
1996	Beadap	"Maayer Ruper"	Sapan Jagmohan	
1996	Beadap	"Piriti Kinte Hole"	Sapan Jagmohan	
1996	Biyer Phool	"Jatoi Karo"(Duet)	Jatin–Lalit	Kumar Sanu
1996	Biyer Phool	"Cham Cham Nupur"	Jatin–Lalit	Vijayta Pandit
1996	Biyer Phool	"Aaj Didir Biye"	Jatin–Lalit	
1996	Biyer Phool	"Ei Jibaner Ei Je Khela"	Jatin–Lalit	
1996	Lathi	"Amar Misti Ekta"	Bappi Lahiri	
1996	Lathi	"Tomra Amar Swargo"	Bappi Lahiri	
1996	Mahan	"Chotta Belar Sei Sob"	Mrinal Benerjee	Kumar Sanu
1996	Mukhyamantri	"Krishnagarer Thake Krishna"	Mrinal Benerjee	
1997	Jiban Juddha	"Janma Amar Kalo"	Nadeem–Shravan	Ila Arun
1997	Jiban Juddha	"Chor Chor Maan"	Nadeem–Shravan	
1997	Jiban Juddha	"Lajja Keno Elo"	Nadeem–Shravan	
1997	Jibon Jouban	"Kono Andha Galir"	Sapan Jagmohan	Kumar Sanu
1997	Jibon Jouban	"Moner Basay Aajke"	Sapan Jagmohan	
1997	Nishpap Asami	"Tomar Amar Mon"	Ashok Bhadra	Kumar Sanu
1998	Praner Cheye Priyo	"Tomar Kachhe"	Anupam Dutta	Abhijeet Bhattacharya
1998	Praner Cheye Priyo	"Aamader Swapna"	Anupam Dutta	Abhijeet Bhattacharya
1998	Putra Badhu	"Ami Chirodin Tomakei"	Anupam Dutta	Kumar Sanu
1998	Putra Badhu	"Tomar Preme Pagol"	Anupam Dutta	Kumar Sanu
1998	Raja Rani Badsha	"Ogo Paharadar"	Babul Bose	
1998	Raja Rani Badsha	"Chuona Chuona"	Babul Bose	
1999	Sindhoor Khela	"Chi Na Amar"	Uttam Singh	Babul Supriyo
1999	Swapna Nilea	"Amar Chokher"	Ajay Chakraborty	
2000	Shesh Thikana	"Keu Nei Kachakachi"	Rijib Chakraborty	
2001	Bidhatar Khela	"Hridoy Tumar"	Tabun	Babul Supriyo
2001	Dada Thakur	"Love Love Mane Pyar"	Babul Bose	Udit Narayan
2002	Bor Kone	"Ki Name Dakbo"	Ashish Kumar	Babul Supriyo
2002	Janam Janamer Sathi	"Elena Tumije"	Anand–Milind	Abhijeet Battacharya
2002	Janam Janamer Sathi	"Bhalobeshe Aami Je"	Anand–Milind	
2002	Jibon Judh	"Save Koli Phool"	Babul Bose	
2002	Jibon Judh	"Na Na Na Omon"	Babul Bose	Babul Supriyo
2002	Kurukshetra	"Kokila Kuhu Sure"	Ashok Bhadra	
2002	Pratihinsa	"Sapno Amar"	Tabun	Shaan
2002	Prem Shakti	"Babar Charan Tale"	Tabun	Rana
2002	Prem Shakti	"Sunechhi Bhagwan"	Tabun	Soham Chakraborty
2002	Pratarak	"Subho Kamona"(Female)	Ashim Chatterge	
2002	Pratarak	"Jemon Nachai"	Ashim Chatterge	
2002	Sapath Nilam	"Goon Goon"	Ajoy Das	
2002	Se Aamar Prem	"Aare Na Na Na"	Bappi Lahiri	
2002	Tak Jhal Mishti	"Kotha Hoyechilo"	Tabun	
2002	Tak Jhal Mishti	"Kato Na Mojar"	Tabun	
2002	Tak Misti Jiban	"Ae To Bestop Misti"	Babul Bose	Babul Supriyo
2002	Tak Misti Jiban	"Nira La La Mayadini"	Babul Bose	
2003	Adhorni	"Ami Je Ek Pakhi"	Babu Kishan, Amar Mukerji	
2003	Adhorni	"Shukhi Kajol"	Babu Kishan, Amar Mukerji	
2003	Champion	"Bondhu Bole"(Duet)	S. P. Venkatesh	Mano
2003	Champion	"Chokhe Lage Nesha"	S. P. Venkatesh	Babul Supriyo
2003	Champion	"Mono Pore Koto Kotha"	S. P. Venkatesh	
2003	Champion	"Cholo Na Prem Kori"	S. P. Venkatesh	Mano
2003	Champion	"Bondhu Bole"(Female)	S. P. Venkatesh	
2003	Moner Majhe Tumi	"Akashe Batase"	Devendranath Chatterje	Sadhana Sargam
2003	Moner Majhe Tumi	"Chupi Chupi Kichhi Kotha"	Devendranath Chatterje	
2003	Qayamat	"Jani Na Prem Kina"	Nadeem–Shravan	Abhijeet Bhattacharya
2003	Sangee	"Hok Na Se Abhinoy"	S. P. Venkatesh	
2003	Sukh Dukher Sansar	"Ar Katodin Pare"	Anupam Dutta	
2004	Aakrosh	"E Kalo Kalo Chokhe"	Prashanth Nanda	Shaan
2004	Aakrosh	"Tumi Aami Pothohara"	Prashanth Nanda	
2004	Sindurer Bandhan	"Bhulbona Seto Aar"	Ajoy Das	
2005	Agnipath	"Aamader Sansar"	Indrajith	Kumar Sanu
2005	Agnipath	"Kajol Kaalo Chokhe"	Indrajith	Babul Supriyo
2005	Haar Jeet	"Nesai Doba Golap"	Abhijeet Bhattacharya	
2005	Haar Jeet	"Tomar Chokher Dike"	Abhijeet Bhattacharya	Abhijeet Bhattacharya
2005	Rajmohal	"Amar Chokhe Agun"	Ashok Bhadra	Kumar Sanu
2005	Rajmohal	"Ke Achho Jege Kothay"	Ashok Bhadra	
2008	Aainaate	"Roj Shata Shata"	Jaydev Sen	
2008	Biyer Lagna	"Prem Sotti Prem Sotti"	Devendranath Chattopadhyay	
2008	Jor	"Akasher Neel"(Female)	S. P. Venkatesh	
2008	Jor	"Akasher Neel"(Duet)	S. P. Venkatesh	Mano
2008	Jor	"Jonom Jonom"(Duet)	S. P. Venkatesh	VV Prasanna
2008	Jor	"Golaper Moto"	S. P. Venkatesh	Mano
2009	Aparadhi	"Premier Ghari"	Bappi Lahiri	
