= Nishpap Asami =

- Directed by: Swapan Saha
- Starring: Chiranjeet Chakraborty; Rituparna Sengupta; Abhishek Chatterjee; Indrani Dutta; Dulal Lahiri; Subhasish Mukhopadhyay
- Music by: Ashok Bhadra
- Distributed by: Nabarun Film Distributors
- Release date: 1997
- Country: India
- Language: Bengali
- Budget: Rs. 18 Lakhs
- Box office: Rs. 60 Lakhs

Nishpap Asami (transl. Innocent accused) is a 1997 Bengali drama film directed by Swapan Saha. This film's music was composed by Ashok Bhadra. The film became a huge commercial hit.

== Cast ==
- Chiranjeet Chakraborty as Sanjoy Mitra
- Rituparna Sengupta
- Abhishek Chatterjee
- Indrani Dutta
- Dulal Lahiri
- Subhendu Chatterjee
- Subhasish Mukhopadhyay
- Anuradha Ray
- Chanchal Dutta
- Master Saranjit
