= Achena Prem =

2011 Indian Bengali film

- Release poster
- Directed by: Swapan Saha
- Screenplay by: Manjil Banerjee
- Story by: Manjil Banerjee
- Produced by: Maa Kali Films
- Starring: Barsha Priyadarshini; Anuradha Ray; Subhasish Mukhopadhyay
- Cinematography: Niranjan Das
- Edited by: Suresh Urs
- Music by: Ashok Bhadra
- Release date: 8 July 2011
- Country: India
- Language: Bengali

Achena Prem is a 2011 Bengali romantic film directed by Swapan Saha and produced under the banner of Maa Kali Films. The movie is an unofficial remake of hit Kannada movie Mussanjemaatu. Surprisingly the fact that it is a remake of the Kannada movie has not been mentioned either on the Achena Prem's official website or in other reviews/articles on the internet. All Kannada songs from the original have also been retained in the movie.

== Plot ==
Rahul is a popular radio jockey who likes to solve people's problem. He meets Tanu and falls in love with her, but never expresses his feelings to her.

== Cast ==
- Barsha Priyadarshini as Tanu
- Anuradha Ray as Rahul's Mother
- Aakash as Rahul
- Mou Saha as Mita
- Bodhisattwa Majumdar as Tanu's Father
- Subhasish Mukherjee as Rahul's office Colleague

== Music ==
The film's music was composed by Ashok Bhadra.

== Reception ==
A critic from The Indian Express wrote that "His [Saha's] recent films, however, reveal he has lost his magic touch. But this is probably because he casts new actors in challenging leads, which they are unable to handle. Achena Prem is one example".
