= Sajani (2004 film) =

- Sajani Dvd cover
- Directed by: Swapan Saha
- Written by: Snehashish Chakraborty (Dialogues)
- Screenplay by: Snehashish Chakraborty
- Story by: R. B. Choudary
- Produced by: Debendra Kuchar
- Starring: See below
- Edited by: Suresh Urs
- Music by: Ashok Bhadra
- Distributed by: Eskay Movies
- Release date: 19 November 2004
- Country: India
- Language: Bengali

Sajani is a 2004 Indian Bengali-language romantic drama film directed by Swapan Saha and produced by Debendra Kuchar. The film features actors Prosenjit Chatterjee and Rimi Sen in the lead roles. Music of the film has been composed by Ashok Bhadra. The film was a remake of Tamil film Arputham.

== Plot ==
Ashok whiles away his time smoking and drinking alcohol, using his father's hard-earned money. He falls in love with Priya, unaware of the fact that she is in love with another man, Rahul.

== Cast ==
- Prosenjit Chatterjee as Ashok
- Rimi Sen as Priya, Ashok's love interest & Rahul's fiancée
- Jisshu Sengupta as Rahul
- Subhasish Mukhopadhyay as Rana, Ashok's Friend
- Locket Chatterjee as Rimi, Ashok's Sister
- Bodhisattwa Majumdar as Ashok's Father
- Lokesh Ghosh as Gobindo, Mad Guy
- Anuradha Ray as Ashok's Mother
- Kalyani Mondal as Priya's Mother
- Abhik Bhattacharya as Priya's Father

== Soundtrack ==
Sajani

Film score by Ashok Bhadra
- Released: 2004
- Genre: Feature film soundtrack
- Label: Eskay Movies
- Producer: Debendra Kuchar

Ashok Bhadra chronology
Tyaag (2004)	Sajani (2004)	Raja Babu (2004)

No	Song title	Singers
1	"Bhalo Laage Shudhu Tomake"	Udit Narayan, Deepmala Bhattacharya
2	"Tomar Oai Duti Chokh"	Babul Supriyo, Deepmala Bhattacharya
3	"Jani Khunje Pabo"	Jolly Mukherjee
4	"Kal Je Ki Hobe Keu Jane Na"	Abhijeet Bhattacharya
5	"Ki Hoto Moner Kotha Janale"	Kumar Sanu, Poornima
6	"O Saathi Re (Duet) "	Babul Supriyo, Sadhana Sargam
7	"O Saathi Re (Male)"	Babul Supriyo
