= Coolie (2004 film) =

- DVD cover
- Directed by: Swapan Saha
- Written by: N.K. Salil (Story, Screenplay & Dialogues)
- Starring: Mithun Chakraborty; Meghna Naidu; Abhishek Chatterjee; Kalyani Mondal
- Cinematography: K.V. Ramanna
- Edited by: Suresh Urs
- Music by: Songs: Ashok Bhadra; Score: S.P. Venkatesh
- Production company: Vijay-Laxmi Movies Pvt. Ltd.
- Release date: 17 September 2004
- Running time: 125 minutes
- Country: India
- Language: Bengali

Coolie (Bengali: কুলি) is a 2004 Indian Bengali-language action film directed by Swapan Saha, written by N.K. Salil and produced by Vijay-Laxmi Movies Pvt. Ltd. The film stars Mithun Chakraborty and Meghna Naidu along with Dulal Lahiri, Abhishek Chatterjee, Nishita Goswami, Subhasish Mukherjee in supporting roles. This film marks the Bengali debut of Meghna Naidu and Nishita Goswami. This movie was later dubbed in Bhojpuri with the same title.

== Plot ==
Shiba (Mithun Chakraborty) is working as a coolie in Birpur Railway Station, and he is a hard-working man who cannot tolerate injustice towards the poor. Seema (Meghna Naidu), daughter of a wealthy businessman, during return to home, encounters with Shiba fighting goons in the station. After she reaches home, Seema's father asks why she was late. Seema replied that there was a situation in the station, and she met a coolie who was a very nice person. Shiba has a younger brother whom he has sent to Kolkata for studies, and in flashback, a scene appears, where Shiba's brother Dibyendu (Premjit Mukherjee) denies going for further studies to Kolkata at first because of financial problems, but later he agrees when Shiba told him that Shiba gave his words to their late mother to make his brother educated and established. During a railway strike, when Seema's car broke near the station, Shiba helps to fix the car. Seema asks him how come he knows car repairing. Shiba replied that he had done various works for the sake of living and today itself he has to earn 500 rupees so that he can send it to his brother for college fees and he doesn't know how he will do it as today is strike hence no passenger in the station so no work. After listening to everything, Seema gave him 599 rupees and told him that this is not a favor, but she is lending him as a token of friendship. But Shiba refuses to take the money. Mitali (Nishita Goswami) finds Dibyendu in a coffee shop working as a waiter and asks him why he is doing this. Dibyendu told her about his financial conditions, and then Mitali asks him to leave this job and instead to give her private tuition as he was a brilliant student. Dibyendu at first refuses to do so, but when Mitali's mother, who lost her son in years ago, mistakes Dibyendu as 'Subho', he agrees with Mitali's scheme and gives his words to Mitali's mother that he will come to meet her daily. Seema expresses her love for Shiba through a radio program. On another side, Mitali's father tells Dibyendu to forget all his past life and start his life as their son so that Mitali's mother can come out of her mental break down. Seema's father refuses their relationship, later goes to Shiba to threaten him and gives him some money not to interfere in Seema's life. Seema quarrels with his father, and at last, she leaves her home and goes to Shiba to live together. On their first night, Shiba proposes to Seema that they will not have any child, as Seeba thinks of Dibyendu as his own child rather than his brother after their mother died. Seema's father sends a gift box (which eventually has drugs in it) to her newly married daughter as of her marriage gift. The next day police come and arrest Shiba. Seema's father refuses to arrange bail for Shiba as she refuses to forget him. Mitali's father assigned Dibyendu as his company's managing director and tells him about how Shiba got arrested for drugs. Mr. Chowdhury makes Dibyendu influence to sign an agreement that he will never look back to his past relations with his brother. Seema goes in search for Dibyendu, but Mr. Chowdhury insults her and calls the guard to throw her out of the house. Some goons try to misbehave with lone Seema when she was weeping alone in a temple. A mysterious man appeared, fights with them and saves Seema. The man told Seema not to walk around alone at night and asks her if she will come to his place. At first, Seema hesitates to go, but later she goes along with him. This man was Raja, who was a small time conman, living with a pickpocket girl named Rupasi and another two friends. They addresses Seema as their sister. Raja promises Seema that he will help her to meet Dibyendu, but when he arrived to Chowdhury's home, seeing the mental breakdown of Mrs. Chowdhury, Raja couldn't force Dibyendu to come with him. Shiba, gets released from jail due to his good behavior in jail and returning home, he encounters with Rupasi. Rupasi takes Shiba, where Seema was living with them, and they unite. Shiba goes to meet with his brother, but Dibyendu refuses to recognize his brother (as per agreement) and insults him in front of all company board members. Mitali meets Dibyendu outside of the meeting room, and gives him some money as a payoff for everything he has done for his younger brother Dibyendu and tells him not to interfere in their life. The rest of the movie deals with how Shiba deals with everything and reunites with his brother happily.

== Cast ==
- Mithun Chakraborty as Shibnath Roy alias Shiba, coolie no 440 workings in Birpur Railway Station
- Meghna Naidu as Seema Mukherjee, a wealthy businessman's daughter and Shiba's wife
- Abhishek Chatterjee as Raja, a small time conman/Shubho, lost son of Mr. And Mrs. Chowdhury
- Rimjhim Gupta as Rupasi, a pickpocket and partner in crime of Raja
- Dulal Lahiri as Mr. Shashank Chowdhury, owner of Chowdhury Motors & Mitali's father
- Kalyani Mondal as Mrs. Chowdhury, mother of Mitali
- Subhasish Mukherjee as Station Master of Birpur Railway Station
- Ramen Raychowdhury as Mr. Mukherjee, a businessman from Garia, father of Seema
- Nishita Goswami as Mitali Chowdhury, Daughter of Mr. Chowdhury and love interest of Dibyendu
- Premjit Mukherjee as Dibyendu Roy alias Dibyo, Shiba's Brother
- N. K. Salil as Raja's friend
- Shyamal Dutta as Mr. Chatterjee
- Sumit Ganguly as Mr. Dutta, Shashank Chowdhury's manager

== Soundtrack ==
Coolie

Soundtrack album by Ashok Bhadra
- Released: 2004
- Recorded: 2004
- Genre: Feature film soundtrack

Ashok Bhadra chronology
Paribar (2004)	Coolie (2004)	Badsha The King (2004)

Singles from Coolie

All lyrics are written by Gautam Sushmit; all music is composed by Ashok Bhadra.

No.	Title	Singer(s)	Length
1.	"Green Signal Ami Peye Gechhi"	Kumar Sanu, Shreya Ghoshal	04:50
2.	"Mon Boro Obujh Mon"	Shreya Ghoshal	05:05
3.	"Ami Kolkatar Sera Rupasi (Jodi Khopa Badhi)"	Alka Yagnik
4.	"Matka Garam Hole Mama (Thanda Mathay Thaki Bole)"	Kumar Sanu, Chorus
5.	"Prem Korar Manush"	Shaan, Shreya Ghoshal	04:37
6.	"Bhalobasai Amar Ei"	Kumar Sanu
7.	"Green Signal Ami Peye Gechhi - II"	Kumar Sanu, Shreya Ghoshal
8.	"Bhalobasai Amar Ei - Sad"	Kumar Sanu
