= Tyaag (2004 film) =

- Tyaag vcd cover
- Directed by: Swapan Saha
- Written by: Snehashish Chakraborty
- Screenplay by: Snehashish Chakraborty
- Story by: K. Bhagyaraj
- Starring: See below
- Cinematography: K V RAMANNA
- Edited by: Suresh Urs
- Music by: Ashok Bhadra
- Release date: 2 July 2004
- Country: India
- Language: Bengali

Tyaag (transl. Sacrifice) is a 2004 Bengali action drama film directed by Swapan Saha. The film stars Prosenjit and Rachana Banerjee, with music composed by Ashok Bhadra.

== Cast ==
- Prosenjit Chatterjee as Bijoy Choudhury
- Rachana Banerjee as Anjali, Bijoy's love interest
- Tapas Paul as Avik, Puja's husband
- Dulal Lahiri
- Rajesh Sharma as Raghu
- Locket Chatterjee as Puja, Bijoy's sister
- Subhasish Mukherjee as Bijoy's maternal uncle
- Piya Sengupta as Rupa, Avik's sister

== Soundtrack ==
Music: Ashok Bhadra Lyrics: Priyo Chatterjee

1. "Ei Shubho Dine" – Kumar Sanu, Sadhana Sargam
2. "Dure Oi Neel Akash" – Kumar Sanu, Deepmala
3. "Moner Kotha Bolbo" – Kumar Sanu, Sadhana Sargam
4. "Asbe Din Asbe Raat" – Kumar Sanu, Sadhana Sargam, Deepmala
