= Kaushik Banerjee =

Indian actor

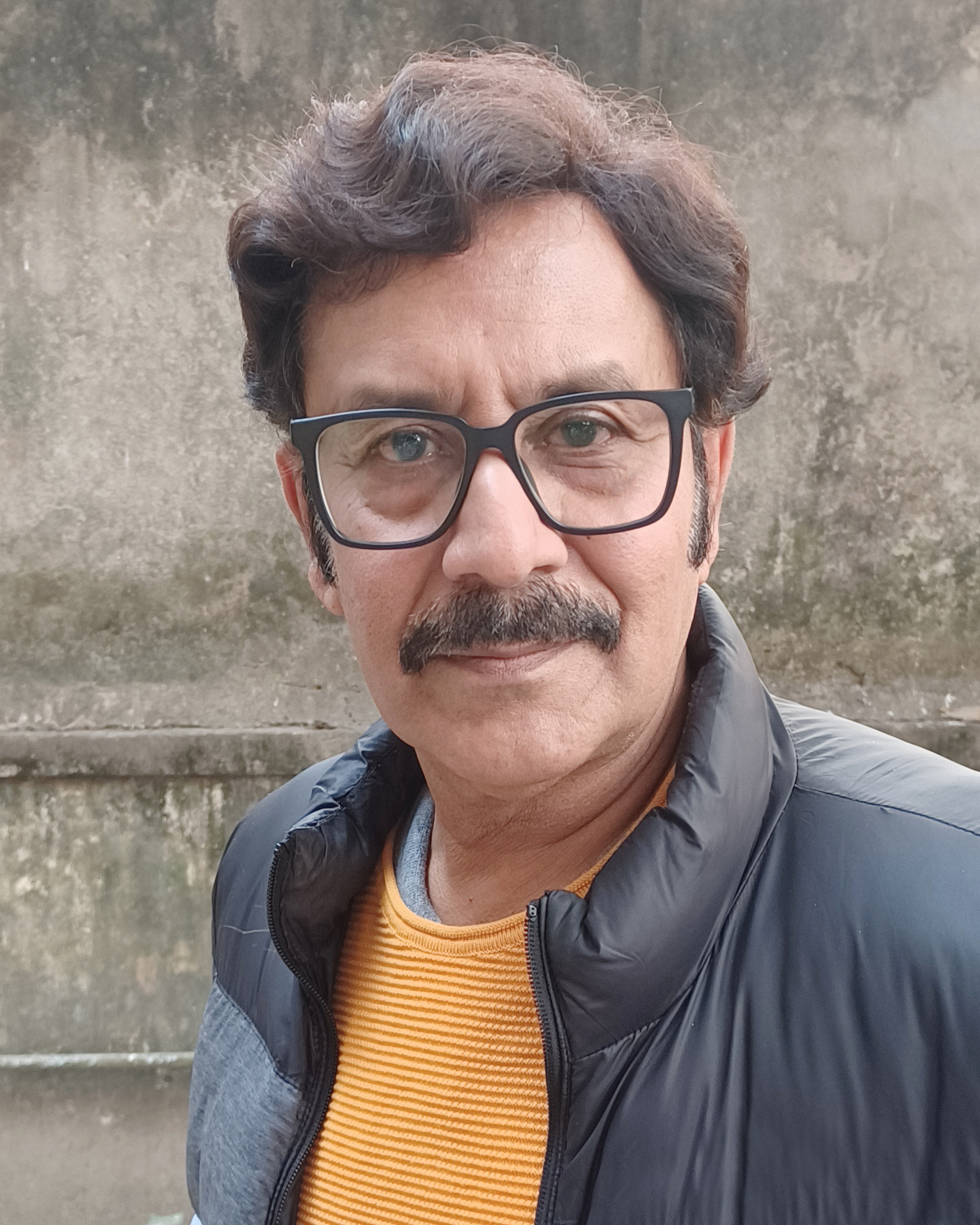
- Banerjee in 2024
- Born: 2 February 1957 (age 69)
- Occupation: Actor
- Years active: 1980–present
- Notable work: Dadar Kirti; Bishabriksha; Bhalobasa Bhalobasa; Paromitar Ek Din; Shubho Mahurat
- Spouse: Monobina Mitra Laboni Sarkar
- Children: Susnato Banerjee
- Father: Haradhan Banerjee

Kaushik Banerjee is an Indian actor who is known for his work in Bengali cinema. He has appeared in more than a 100 films throughout his career of four decades.

Born to the ace actor Haradhan Bannerjee, he made his acting debut opposite Mahua Roychoudhury in Dinen Gupta's Bengali romantic film Priyatama (1980). He claimed to fame for his lascivious role as Devendra in Ajoy Kar's Bishabriksha (1984 film) which is based on the novel of the same name by Bankim Chandra Chatterjee. Since his role as Devendra was much celebrated, he has often been typecast in salacious, negative roles in a number of Bengali films. He collaborated with Aparna Sen in Paromitar Ek Din (2000), Rituparno Ghosh in Shubho Mahurat (2003) and Chitrangada: The Crowning Wish (2012).

== Personal life ==
He is married to Laboni Sarkar. He has a son, named Susnato Banerjee.

== Filmography ==
- Priyotama (1979)
- Pakadekha (1980)
- Dadar Kirti [As guest] (1980)
- Phatik Chand (1983)
- Bhalobasha Bhalobasha (1985)
- Chhoto Bokulpurer Jatri (1987)
- Beder Meye Josna (1991)
- Surer Bhubane (1992)
- Priya (1992)
- Apan Par (1992)
- Samparka (1993)
- Daan Pratidan (1993)
- Wheel Chair (1994)
- Rajar Raja (1994)
- Pratyaghat (1994)
- Mahabharati (1994)
- Kalpurush (1994)
- Rakhal Raja (1995)
- Premsangee (1995)
- Naginkanya (1995)
- Lathi (1996)
- Samadhan (1997)
- Premsangee (1997)
- Pabitra Papi (1997)
- Mittir Barir Chhoto Bou (1997)
- Mahabir Krishna (1997)
- Bahurupa (1997)
- Sagar Banya (1998)
- Ranakshetra (1998)
- Naag Nagini (1998)
- Mayer Dibyi (1998)
- Swamir Ghar (1999)
- Sundar Bou (1999)
- Satyam Shivam Sundaram (1999)
- Satru Dhwansa (1999)
- Madhu Malati (1999)
- Krishna Kaberi (1999)
- Kanchanmala (1999)
- Daye Dayitwa (1999)
- Sasurbari Zindabad (2000)
- Paromitar Ekdin (2000)
- Mayna (2000)
- Bhalobasi Tomake (2000)
- Ashray (2000)
- Prem Pratigya (2001)
- Pratibad (2001)
- Jamaibabu Jindabad (2001)
- Jabab Chai (2001)
- Guru Shisya (2001)
- Streer Maryada (2002)
- Sonar Sansar (2002)
- Protarak (2002)
- Shatrur Mokabila (2002) as OC Shankar
- Prem Shakti (2002)
- Pratihinsa (2002)
- Kurukshetra (2002) as Protul Roy
- Janam Janamer Sathi (2002)
- Sukh Dukkher Sansar (2003)
- Sharbari (2003)
- Rakta Bandhan (2003)
- Rakhe Hari Mare Ke (2003)
- Memsaheb (2003)
- Guru (2003)
- Andha Prem (2003)
- Premi (2004)
- Adhikar (2004)
- Abhishek (2004)
- Yuddho (2005)
- Debi (2005)
- Dada (2005)
- Chita (2005)
- Agnipath (2005)
- Mahasangram (2006)
- Eri Naam Prem (2006)
- Agnipariksha (2006)
- Niswabda (2007)
- Minister Fatakeshto (2007)
- Aloy Phera (2007)
- Mahakaal (2008)
- Rajkumar (2008)
- Badla (2009)
- Love Circus (2010)
- Ganyer Meye Sovona (2010)
- Antim Shwash Sundar (2010)
- Mahanagari (2010)
- Kachhe Achho Tumi (2010)
- Bejanma (2010)
- Shedin Dekha Hoyechilo (2010)
- Romeo (2011) ... Pooja's Father
- Hridoye Lekho Naam (2012)
- Chitrangada (2012)
- Gundaraj (2013)
- Dekha Na Dekhay (2013)
- Chupi Chupi (2013)
- Abhimaan(2016)
- Antoral (2013)
- Love Express (2016) as Prasanta Sen
- Tumi Ashbe Bole(2021)

== Television ==
- Membou
- Jamuna Dhaki as Kedar Roy
- Netaji as Tara Prasanna Bose
- Karunamoyee Rani Rashmoni( Uttar Parbo) as Sabarna Roy Choudhury
- Dutta And Bouma
- Tumpa Autowali
- Panchami
- Jogomaya
- Sholok Saree
- Parashuram – Ajker Nayok as Satyajit Mukherjee
- Professor Bidya Banerjee

== Awards ==
- Zee Bangla Sonar Sansar Awards 2021– Priyo Sashur as Kedar Roy for Jamuna Dhaki
