= Sangram (2005 film) =

2005 Indian Bengali film

- Theatrical release poster
- Sangram
- Directed by: Haranath Chakraborty
- Written by: Story: Snehasis Chakraborty; Screenplay & Dialogues: Subhash sen
- Produced by: Mukul Sarkar
- Starring: Jisshu Sengupta; Prosenjit Chatterjee; Ranjit Mallick
- Cinematography: V. Prabhakar
- Edited by: Swapan Guha
- Music by: Songs: Ashok Bhadra; Score: S.P. Venkatesh
- Distributed by: T.Sarkar Productions; Surinder Films
- Release date: 2005
- Country: India
- Language: Bengali

Sangram is a 2005 Indian Bengali language thriller film directed by Haranath Chakraborty and produced by Mukul Sarkar. The film features actors Jisshu Sengupta, Prosenjit Chatterjee and Ranjit Mallick in the lead roles. Ashok Bhadra composed the music for the film. The film was a box office hit.

== Plot ==
The story of the film is set in a village named Shimulpur village. Satyaprakash, a popular schoolmaster in the village teaching in the Shimulpur High School, is an honorable person in the village. An election campaign was held at the school, Raghav Choudhury and Mohan Roy being the two opponent candidates. Out of them, Mohan was an honest man and wanted to win the elections by maintaining peace and order in the society. But, Raghav takes the other trail and starts troubling the local villagers. Satyaprakash can't tolerate this, and so, he protests against this, by advising the villagers to boycott the elections. Raghav tried to shut the mouth of Satyaprakash and put an end to his activities by bribing him, but he failed. Ultimately, seeing no other way, Raghav kills Satyaprakash. Satyaprakash had two children. His elder son was Karna, and his younger son was Somu. Karna knew his father's murderer, but society forced HIM not to do anything to him and leave the village. He got shelter in a Colonel's house and is brought up there. As he grows, he makes the plans to take revenge on Raghav Choudhury. Meanwhile, Raghav Choudhury became a don of the village and started doing many illegal activities along with his brother Rajesh Choudhury and his friends. On the other hand, during these years, Mohan Roy had paid for Somu's studies. Somu, who had gone abroad to complete his higher education, returned to the village. He and Mohan's daughter, Anjali, were in love with each other. Later, when Mohan Roy protested against Raghav, he got him murdered too by Rajesh. In the meantime, Karna returns, and with the active support of the Colonel, he killed Raghav and his whole gang, thereby fulfilling his revenge. The film ends as finally the Colonel and Karna surrender themselves to the police.

== Cast ==
- Prosenjit Chatterjee as Karna Ghosh
- Jisshu Sengupta as Somu Ghosh
- Ranjit Mallick as Colonel Vikram Sinha
- Deepankar De as Raghav Chowdhury
- Rajesh Sharma as Rajesh Chowdhury, Raghav's brother
- Sabyasachi Chakrabarty as Inspector Biswadeb Rai
- Arun Banerjee as Abani Samanta
- Dulal Lahiri as Mohon Roy
- Kanchan Mullick as Karna's aid
- Pradip Mukherjee as Satyaprakash Ghosh, Karna and Somu's father
- Debesh Roy Chowdhury as Corrupt police inspector
- Aparajita Mohanty as Mitali Ghosh, Karna & Somu's mother
- Arunima Ghosh as Sumedha Chatterjee, Karna's love interest
- Soumili Biswas as Anjali Roy, Somu's love interest

== Soundtrack ==
Sangram

Soundtrack album by Ashok Bhadra
- Released: 2005
- Genre: Feature film soundtrack
- Length: 19:54
- Label: Eskay Movies

Ashok Bhadra chronology
Agni (2004)	Sangram (2005)	Rajmohol (2005)

Music of Sangram has been composed by Ashok Bhadra.

=== Track listing ===
No.	Title	Length
1.	"Ajker Dinta Onno Rakom"	4:37
2.	"Amar Ayi Chokh Diye" (Performed by Shreya Ghoshal)	5:13
3.	"Love Love"	5:53
4.	"Tomay Paye Holo"	4:11
Total length:		19:54
