= Debi (2005 film) =

- Theatrical release poster
- Directed by: Swapan Saha
- Screenplay by: N. K. Salil
- Story by: M. S. Reddy
- Produced by: Mukul Sarkar
- Starring: Debashree Roy; Rachna Banerjee; Jisshu Sengupta; Kaushik Banerjee; Ramaprasad Banik; Locket Chatterjee
- Edited by: Suresh Urs
- Music by: Ashok Bhadra
- Release date: 2005
- Running time: 160 minutes
- Country: India
- Language: Bengali

Debi is a 2005 devotional Bengali-language mythological fantasy film directed by Swapan Saha and produced by Mukul Sarkar. The film features Jisshu Sengupta, Debashree Roy and Rachana Banerjee in the lead roles. Music of the film has been composed by Ashok Bhadra. The concept of the film was adopted from Kodi Ramakrishna's film Ammoru (1995) which is a Telegu film.

== Cast ==
- Jisshu Sengupta
- Debashree Roy
- Rachana Banerjee as Joba
- Ramaprasad Banik
- Locket Chatterjee
- Koushik Bandyopadhyay as Ashur
- Sunil Mukhopadhyay
- Sanghamitra Bandyopadhyay
- Ashok Mukhopadhyay
- Ramen Raychowdhury

== Soundtrack ==
The songs were composed by Ashok Bhadra.
