= Mahakaal (2008 film) =

- The poster for the film Mahakaal
- Directed by: Swapan Ghosal
- Starring: Prasenjit; Indira Dhar
- Music by: Devjit
- Release date: 31 October 2008
- Running time: 2:20:00
- Country: India
- Language: Bengali

Mahakaal is a 2008 Indian Bengali film directed by Swapan Ghosal.

== Background ==
Mahakaal is a revenge story based on the Anil Kapoor and Madhuri Dixit starring movie Parinda. Indira Dhar, playing the role of a college student who falls in love with Prosenjit (Joy), debuted in this film.

== Plot ==
Prof. Ajoy Mukherjee and his wife Aditi witness a murder, committed by the vociferous criminal Digbijay. In spite of repeated warnings from Digbijay and his right hand Loha the couple testifies against them and they go to jail for seven years. After coming out Digbijay turns out to be even stronger and proceeds to attack Ajoy's family. He sends a man called Binod Sharma who pretends to be a friend of Joy, Ajoy's brother. Digbijay and Binod conspire against Joy and Ajoy. After sending his own man to rob Joy of two lack rupees, Binod compels Joy to commit murder. In the meantime, Digbijay fatally stabs Ajoy and frames Joy for the murder. Local inspector Dilip Lahiri also turns out to be a peer of Digbijay. While Joy remains in police custody, Digbijay rapes and murders Joy's younger sister Dia. After all these incidents Aditi commits suicide. Joy teams up with his friends Kanchan and Kumar to seek revenge. They kill Binod, Dilip, Loha, and Digbijay one after the other and are consequently jailed for five years.

== Cast ==
- Prasenjit as Joy Mukherjee
- Indira Dhar as Ratri
- Tapas Paul as Ajay Mukherjee
- Laboni Sarkar as Aditi Mukherjee
- Rajatava Dutta as Vinod Sharma
- Kaushik Banerjee as Digvijay Pradhan
- Pushpita Mukherjee as Dia Mukherjee
- Kanchan Mullick as Kanchan Mallick
- Sumit Gangopadhyay as Loha
- Rajesh Sharma as ACP Dilip Lahiri
- Ashim Roy Chowdhury as Joy's friend
- Ramen Roy Chowdhury as police commissioner

== Soundtrack ==
1. "Ei Mon Jodi Jeto Go Dekha" - Shreya Ghoshal, Babul Supriyo
2. "Ektu Dekha" - Udit Narayan & Madhura Bhattacharya
3. "Jiboner Ei Poth" - Shaan, Mahalaxmi Iyer, N/A
4. "Lachak Machak" - N/A
