= Kurukshetra (2002 film) =

2002 Indian Bengali action thriller film

- Kurukshetra VCD cover
- Directed by: Swapan Saha
- Produced by: Debendra Kuchar
- Starring: Abdur Razzak; Prosenjit Chatterjee; Rachana Banerjee; Tapas Paul; Jisshu Sengupta
- Music by: Ashok Bhadra
- Release date: 6 December 2002
- Country: India
- Language: Bengali

Kurukshetra (English: Battlefield) is a 2002 Indian Bengali-language action thriller film directed by Swapan Saha and produced by Debendra Kuchar. The film features Abdur Razzak, Prosenjit Chatterjee and Rachana Banerjee in the lead roles. Music of the film has been composed by Ashok Bhadra.

== Plot ==
The movie revolves around rivalry between two village families. One son of the Chowdhury family falls in love with the daughter of Ray family and it results in bloody conflict among their brothers.

== Cast ==
- Prosenjit Chatterjee as Agun Chowdhury
- Rachana Banerjee as Anjali
- Tapas Paul as Rahul Roy
- Jisshu Sengupta as Shagor Chowdhury
- Laboni Sarkar as Rubi Roy
- Subhasish Mukhopadhyay as Chipi
- Abdur Razzak as Raj Shekhar Chowdhury
- Dulal Lahiri as Poran Chakroborthy
- Kaushik Banerjee as Protul Roy
- Kalyani Mondal as Mamata Chowdhury
- Moumita Chakraborty as Nodi Roy

== Soundtrack ==
Kurukshetra

Soundtrack album
- Genre: Feature film soundtrack
- Length: 30:06
- Label: Eskay Music

Official audio
- Kurukshetra - Full Album on YouTube

No.	Title	Length
1.	"Besh korechi Ami"	4:00
2.	"Ki Pelam"	4:05
3.	"Ai Buke Ai"	4:20
4.	"April Fool"	4:30
5.	"Ei To Jibon"	4:28
6.	"Joubonta Jai Paliya"	4:52
7.	"Kokila Kuhu Sure"	3:51
Total length:		30:06
