= Golmaal (2008 film) =

- DVD cover
- Directed by: Swapan Saha
- Written by: Manjil Banerjee
- Produced by: Smt. Mukul Sarkar
- Starring: Prosenjit Chatterjee; Tota Ray Chowdhury; Jisshu Sengupta; Priyanka Trivedi; Barsa Priyadarshini
- Cinematography: Dev Rajan
- Music by: Ashok Bhadra
- Release date: 6 June 2008
- Country: India
- Language: Bengali

Golmaal (Bengali: গোলমাল) is a 2008 Indian Bengali-language action comedy film directed by Swapan Saha and featuring multi-starring Prosenjit Chatterjee, Tota Ray Chowdhury, Jisshu Sengupta, Priyanka Trivedi, Namrata Thapa, Barsa Priyadarshini. The movie is a remake of the Malayalam language film Thenkasipattanam (2000).

== Plot ==
Pralay, an orphan, is given shelter by Kaka Babu, just like the latter had given to the brother- sister orphans, Mainak and Khushi. The three grew up like family members. Growing up, Pranay falls in love with Chandni, the daughter of Tridib Babu, the local don. Pralay and Mainak often clash with Tridib's men and always teach them a lesson. The entry of Sangeeta creates a misunderstanding between the two, as Mainak has a crush on her, but he learns that Sangeeta loves Pralay. Siddhartha is a college-mate of Khushi. He was not getting any scope of conveying his love for her. Ultimately he joins as manager in the Mainak-Pralay company. But due to some misunderstanding Sangeeta has an impression that Pralay would marry her and Mainak was under the impression that Pralay had chosen Chandni as his match. The comedy of errors continues until the entire confusion is cleared.

== Cast ==
- Prosenjit Chatterjee as Pralay
- Tota Ray Chowdhury as Mainak
- Jisshu Sengupta as Siddhartha
- Priyanka Trivedi as Chandni Ghoshal, Pralay's love interest
- Barsa Priyadarshini as Khushi
- Rajatava Dutta as Uncle
- Namrata Thapa as Sangeeta, Mainak's love interest
- Mrinal Mukherjee as Tridib Ghoshal
- Biswanath Basu
- Arpita Becker as Sangeeta's maternal aunty
