= Annaye Atyachar =

- Theatrical release poster
- Directed by: Swapan Saha
- Produced by: Manju Dhanuka
- Starring: Prosenjit Chatterjee; Rachana Banerjee
- Cinematography: Nando Bhattacharya
- Music by: Saikat Ali Iman
- Release date: 7 May 2004
- Running time: 168 minutes
- Country: India
- Language: Bengali

Annaye Atyachar (transl. Injustice oppression) (also called Anyay Atyachar) is a 2004 Bengali action drama film directed by Swapan Saha and produced by Manju Dhanuka. The film features actors Prosenjit Chatterjee and Rachana Banerjee in the lead roles. The music in the film was composed by Saikat Ali Iman.

== Cast ==
- Prosenjit Chatterjee
- Rachana Banerjee
- Jisshu Sengupta
- Laboni Sarkar
- Abdur Razzak
- Nirmal Kumar
- Subhendu Chatterjee
- Rishi Mukherjee
- Moumita Chakraborty
- Manjusree Gangopadhyay

== Production ==
This movie was a remake of Maa Jokhon Bicharok directed by Shohanur Rahman Sohan, starring Manna.

== Soundtrack ==
Annaye Atyachar

Film score by Shaukat Ali Iman
- Released: 2004
- Genre: Soundtrack
- Label: Heart Video
- Producer: Shaukat Ali Iman
