= Sathi Amar =

- Theatrical release poster
- Directed by: Shankar Ray
- Produced by: Pritam Jalan
- Starring: Prosenjit Chatterjee; Rachana Banerjee; Anubhav Mohanty; Laboni Sarkar
- Music by: Ashok Raj
- Release date: 3 November 2005
- Running time: 1:45:12
- Country: India
- Language: Bengali

Sathi Amar is a 2005 Bengali romantic drama film directed by Shankar Ray and produced by Pritam Jalan. The film features actors Prosenjit Chatterjee and Rachana Banerjee in the lead roles. Music of the film has been composed by Ashok Raj

== Plot ==
Raja is a talented voice artist who lives with his sister and takes care of her after their parent's death. Things change for him when he meets Jyoti, a talented painter who is also his sister's friend. As Raja falls for Jyoti, he attempts his best to win over his beloved.

== Cast ==
- Prosenjit Chatterjee as Raja
- Rachana Banerjee as Jyoti, Raja's love interest
- Anubhav Mohanty as Gautam, Jyoti's fiancée
- Laboni Sarkar as Jyoti's mother
- Kanchan Mullick as Anindya, Raja's friend
- Biswanath Basu
- Pushpita Mukherjee as Manoshi, Raja's sister
- Arun Banerjee as Jyoti's father
- Ashok Mukhopadhyay
- Parthasarathi Deb
