= Shakal Sandhya =

- Theatrical release poster
- Directed by: Swapan Saha
- Written by: Snehashish Chakraborty
- Screenplay by: Snehashish Chakraborty
- Story by: Vikraman
- Based on: Unnidathil Ennai Koduthen (Tamil)
- Produced by: Subrato Saha Ray
- Starring: Prosenjit Chatterjee; Rachana Banerjee; Abhishek Chatterjee; Subhasish Mukhopadhyay
- Cinematography: K V RAMANNA
- Edited by: Suresh Urs
- Music by: Ashok Bhadra
- Release date: 29 April 2005
- Country: India
- Language: Bengali

Shakal Sandhya (transl. Morning Evening) is a 2005 Indian Bengali-language romantic drama film directed by Swapan Saha. It stars Prosenjit Chatterjee and Rachana Banerjee, with music composed by Ashok Bhadra. The film is a remake of the 1998 Tamil film Unnidathil Ennai Koduthen.

== Plot ==
This is the story of an innocent girl Anjali who stayed with her father Binoy Roychowdhury and her stepmother Madhobi. Anjali was a poor girl. On the other hand, a thief, Joy, stole a golden statue of a god with his assistant Bhoja and they take shelter at Anjali's house. Joy stayed three days at Anjali's house and he fell in love with her. Joy came to know about Anjali's past life from her diary. Meanwhile, Madhobi accused Anjali of being a thief and threw her out of the home. Joy helped Anjali become a singer. One day Madhobi realised her fault and came to meet Anjali. Joy convinced everyone of Anjali's family to stay with her. Another guy Sandip liked Anjali. Anjali's family fixed her marriage with Sandip. Madhobi blamed Joy as the thief and threw him out of her house. Anjali tried to find Joy. At the moment of a function Anjali told the whole story of her life to the audience and proposed to Joy and accepted him.

== Cast ==
- Prosenjit Chatterjee as Joy
- Rachana Banerjee as Anjali
- Subhasish Mukhopadhyay as Bhoja (Joy's Friend)
- Abhishek Chatterjee as Sandip
- Bodhisattwa Majumdar as Binoy Roy Choudhury, Anjali's father
- Bhaswar Chattopadhyay
- Kanchan Mullick as Bheema, the local goon
- Premjit Mukherjee as News Anchor
- Sanghamitra Bandyopadhyay as Madhobi Roy Choudhury, Anjali's step-mother
- Shantilal Mukherjee

== Soundtrack ==
Shakal Sandhya

Soundtrack album by Ashok Bhadra
- Genre: Feature film soundtrack
- Length: 28:44
- Language: Bengali
- Label: Eskay Music

Official audio
- Shakal Sandhya - Full Album on YouTube

The music of the film is composed by Ashok Bhadra. Lyrics are written by Goutam Sushmit.

No.	Title	Singer(s)	Length
1.	"Akashe Surjo Othe"	Udit Narayan, Sadhana Sargam	4:41
2.	"Kichhu Kichhu Kotha"	Alka Yagnik	5:04
3.	"Gane Gane Sobar"	Sadhana Sargam	4:25
4.	"Ami Hero Hobo"	Kumar Sanu	4:49
5.	"Mon Meteche Mon"	Udit Narayan, Sadhana Sargam	4:30
6.	"Kichhu Kichhu Kotha (Male)"	Udit Narayan	5:15
Total length:			28:44
