= Paribar =

2004 Indian Bengali language film

- Theatrical release poster
- Directed by: Anup Sengupta
- Produced by: Anup Sengupta; Apurba Saha
- Starring: Prosenjit Chatterjee; Ranjit Mallick; Rachana Banerjee; Biplab Chatterjee
- Cinematography: K V RAMANNA
- Music by: Ashok Bhadra
- Release date: 2004
- Country: India
- Language: Bengali

Paribar (lit. 'Family') is a 2004 Bengali family drama film directed by Anup Sengupta and produced by Anup Sengupta and Apurba Saha. The film features Prosenjit Chatterjee, Ranjit Mallick and Rachana Banerjee in the lead roles. Ashok Bhadra composed the music for the film.

== Plot ==
The plot revolves around Sagar, his parents and his siblings. One of Sagar's hands is paralyzed in an accident, in an attempt to save his mother. He and his younger brother Rahul work in a factory. Rahul is married to Swapna, who starts smuggling the factory goods. When this comes to light, Sagar takes the blame and loses his job. Later, when Sagar asks Rahul to borrow some money due to his mother's ill health, his brother harasses him and he returns empty-handed.

Sagar loves Pakhi, but Pakhi's mother opposes their affair. She sees this situation as an opportunity to separate the two lovers. She makes a deal with Sagar: she will give him the money required for his mother's treatment, but in return, he must forget Pakhi. Meanwhile, Sagar's father steals money from Rahul without his knowledge; this results in Rahul further abusing Sagar. Pakhi and her father stop a violent clash by saying that Sagar's father did not steal the money, but that instead, the money was borrowed from them.

The film ends as Rahul's father confesses his deeds and all the misunderstandings are solved. The family leads a happy life thereafter.

== Cast ==
- Prosenjit Chatterjee as Sagar
- Ranjit Mallick as Suryakanta Bose, Pakhi's Father
- Rachana Banerjee as Pakhi Bose, Sagar's love interest
- Biplab Chatterjee
- Mrinal Mukherjee as Madan Hazra, manager
- Subhasish Mukherjee as Ratan, Sapna's brother and Sagar's colleague
- Dulal Lahiri as Mangal Chowdhury, Sagar and Rahul's father
- Anamika Saha as Shanti Chowdhury, Sagar and Rahul's mother
- Anuradha Ray as Nisha Bose, Pakhi's mother
- Locket Chatterjee as Sapna, Rahul's wife
- Raja Chattopadhyay as Rahul
- Piya Sengupta as Manisha
- Ramen Roy Chowdhury

== Soundtrack ==
Paribar

Soundtrack album by Ashok Bhadra
- Released: 2005
- Genre: Feature film soundtrack
- Length: 24:20
- Label: Eskay Music

Official audio
- Paribar - Full Album on YouTube

Ashok Bhadra composed the music for Paribar.

=== Track listing ===
No.	Title	Singer(s)	Length
1.	"Besechhi Bhalo Shudhu Tomake"	Kumar Sanu and Sadhana Sargam	5:04
2.	"Buk Faate Tobu Keno"	Shreya Ghoshal and Babul Supriyo	5:18
3.	"Elo Elo Re Sei Din"		5:08
4.	"Maal Kheye Jodi Na Hoi Besamal"	Kumar Sanu and Poornima	4:16
5.	"Manusher Porichoy"	Kumar Sanu	4:34
Total length:			24:20
