= Rajmohol =

- Directed by: Swapan Saha
- Written by: Madhu Muttam
- Produced by: Ashok Khemka; Bijoy Nopani
- Starring: Prosenjit Chatterjee; Abhishek Chatterjee; Anu Choudhury; Rachana Banerjee; Biplab Chatterjee; Subhasish Mukherjee
- Music by: Ashok Bhadra
- Release date: 2005
- Running time: 157 minutes
- Country: India
- Language: Bengali

Rajmohol (transl. The Royal Mansion) is a 2005 Indian Bengali-language psychological horror film starring Prosenjit Chatterjee, Abhishek Chatterjee, Anu Choudhury, Rachana Banerjee, Biplab Chatterjee, Subhasish Mukherjee, and Bharat Kaul. The film is an adaptation of the 1993 Malayalam film Manichitrathazhu, with slight plot changes involving not only awareness of split personality disorder, but also the existence of Chandramukhi's vengeful spirit.

== Plot ==
A married couple from Kolkata, Deboshree and her husband Sumit, move to a village. There, they move into a supposedly haunted mansion that belonged to Sumit's ancestors. Deboshree then goes into the restricted room and finds out that there was a dancer named Chandramukhi who had been killed by a zamindar (a Persian word meaning "landlord") who lived in that mansion. After mysterious occurrences in the mansion, which appear paranormal, Sumit calls his psychologist friend Dr. Agni from the US, as he believes that there is no ghost. He believes that Malini, who could not marry him, is mentally ill and behind all those incidents. But Dr. Agni makes more comic misunderstandings. Also, Dr. Agni starts to like Malini. But the fact everyone is still unaware of is that there is truly Chandramukhi's spirit who is freed after 150 years when Deboshree unlocks the mysterious room.

In the climax, it is revealed that Deboshree suffers from multiple personality disorder, and because of her sympathy for Chandramukhi, she believes that she is Chandramukhi. She thinks that her husband is the cruel zamindar responsible for Chandramukhi's death, and she must take her revenge by killing him. The fact that Chandramukhi's spirit exists and possesses Deboshree is still unknown to Dr. Agni. Dr. Agni devises a plan and makes Deboshree 'kill' a dummy instead of Sumit. Thinking she has killed Sumit and exacted her revenge, the spirit of Chandramukhi is also satisfied, and it leaves the body of unwell Deboshree. At the end of the movie, a hypnotized Deboshree regains consciousness as her usual self. And Dr. Agni marries Malini.

== Cast ==
- Prosenjit Chatterjee as Dr. Agni
- Abhishek Chatterjee as Sumit
- Anu Choudhury as Debashree, Sumit's wife/Chandramukhi
  - Oindrila Sen as Junior Debashree
- Rachana Banerjee as Malini, Agni's love interest
- Subhasish Mukherjee as Manik, Malini's maternal uncle
- Biplab Chatterjee as Manohar Choudhury, Malini and Abhi's father
- Kalyani Mandal as Bimala, Malini & Abhi's mother
- Soma Chakraborty as Gita, Manik's wife
- Sudeshna Das as Rina, Manik & Gita's daughter
- Premjit Chatterjee as Abhijit aka Abhi, Malini's brother
- Abhik Bhattacharya as Ghana
- Rita Koiral as Maa Sadhika
- Dulal Lahiri as Tarapith Maharaj

== Soundtrack ==
Rajmohol

Soundtrack album by Ashok Bhadra
- Released: 2005
- Genre: Feature film soundtrack
- Length: 19:54
- Label: Eskay Movies

Ashok Bhadra chronology
Debi (2005)	Rajmohol (2005)	Dadar Adesh (2005)

Music of Rajmohol has been composed by Ashok Bhadra. Lyrics of the album were penned by Gautam Susmit. Kumar Sanu, Udit Narayan, Kavita Krishnamurthy, Anuradha Paudwal, Miss Jojo has given their voices for the album.

All lyrics are written by Gautam Susmit.

No.	Title	Lyrics	Singer(s)	Length
1.	"Bhoy Kore O Amar Bhoy Kore"	Gautam Susmit	Miss Jojo (Bengali singer)	04:43
2.	"Amar Chokhe Agun"	Gautam Susmit	Kumar Sanu, Kavita Krishnamurthy	06:12
3.	"Tumi Mone Rekho"	Gautam Susmit	Kumar Sanu, Anuradha Paudwal	05:40
4.	"Ekhane Shudhu Ami"	Gautam Susmit	Udit Narayan, Shreya Ghoshal	05:07
5.	"Sajano Bagan Theke Jhore"	Gautam Susmit	Kumar Sanu	04:33
6.	"Ke Achho Jege Kothay"	Gautam Susmit	Kavita Krishnamurthy	05:25
Total length:				31:40
