= Rajkumar (2008 film) =

- Directed by: Swapan Saha
- Written by: T. A. Shahid (story)
- Screenplay by: N.K. Salil
- Produced by: Gautam Kundu
- Starring: Prosenjit; Anu Chowdhury
- Cinematography: Premendu Bikash Chaki
- Edited by: Suresh Urs
- Music by: Ashok Bhadra
- Distributed by: Rose Valley Films
- Release date: 2008
- Country: India
- Language: Bengali

Rajkumar (Bengali: রাজ কুমার "Prince") is a Bengali action comedy film directed by Swapan Saha, the movie featured Prosenjit and Anu Chowdhury.

== Plot ==
This film about a young boy, Raja, whose mother refuses to recognize when she remarries and he goes on to become "Rajkumar", a "khatal owner" is quite an eventful journey. Upon growing up, Rajkumar returns to S. K. Roy's house (the person whom his mother had remarried) to set things straight as he has the power of attorney of his father's will. His stepbrother Rudra (Abhishek Chatterjee) and sister conspire against him and become his greatest enemies as they want him out of the way, but a few events bring them together and they finish Vishal (Kaushik Banerjee) a partner in crime of Rudra. Rajkumar accepts his mother back into his life, something which he had been refusing for so long.

== Cast ==
- Prosenjit Chatterjee as Raja/ Rajkumar
- Anu Chowdhury as Deepa
- Abhishek Chatterjee as Rudra Roy
- Kaushik Banerjee as Vishal
- Bodhisattwa Majumdar as Suryakanta Roy/ S.K Roy
- Laboni Sarkar as Mamata Roy
- Swarna Kamal Dutta
- Shyamal Dutta as Bhuvan Kaka
- Sumit Ganguly
- Mrityun Hazra as OC Deben Sarkar
