= Badsha the King =

- Theatrical release poster
- Directed by: Shankar Ray
- Produced by: Suman Kumar Das
- Cinematography: K R RAMESH
- Music by: Ashok Bhadra; Snehasish Chakraborty
- Production company: Burima Chitram
- Release date: 3 December 2004
- Country: India
- Language: Bengali

Badsha the King is a 2004 Bengali-language action film directed by Saurav Chakraborty and produced by Suman Kumar Das under the banner of Burima Chitram. The film features actors Prosenjit Chatterjee and Koel Mallick in the lead roles. The film was scored by Ashok Bhadra and Snehasish Chakraborty.

== Cast ==
- Prosenjit Chatterjee as Badsha
- Koel Mallick as Titli, Badsha's love interest
- Mrinal Mukherjee as Sushovan Dutta
- Laboni Sarkar as Manimala, Titli's mother
- Dulal Lahiri
- Subhasish Mukhopadhyay
- Anamika Saha
- Rajesh Sharma as Shaktinath, Titli's maternal uncle
- Locket Chatterjee
- Shantilal Mukherjee as Kartik, Shaktinath's PA

== Soundtrack ==
Badsha The King

Soundtrack album by Ashok Bhadra, Snehasish Chakraborty
- Released: 03/12/2004
- Genre: Feature film soundtrack

Ashok Bhadra chronology
Agni (2004)	Badsha The King (2004)	Coolie (2004)

Snehasish Chakraborty chronology
Mon Jake Chay (2004)	Badsha The King (2004)	Anurag (2004)

Ashok Bhadra and Snehasish Chakraborty composed the film score of Badsha The King. Babul Supriyo, Kumar Sanu, Udit Narayan, Deepmala & Sadhana Sargam sung all the songs of this film.

=== Track listing ===
No.	Title	Singer(s)	Length
1.	"Amader Ei Jibone"	Kumar Sanu	4:05
2.	"Ei Mone Premer Kobita"	Kumar Sanu, Deepmala	4:33
3.	"Likhechi Amar Moner Kobita"	Babul Supriyo, Sadhana Sargam	4:56
4.	"Sathi Eto Bhalobasa"	Udit Narayan, Deepmala	4:24
5.	"Tomar Choyay Eto Agun"	Kumar Sanu, Deepmala/Shreya Ghoshal	4:21
Total length:			22:19
