= Agni (2004 film) =

2004 Indian Bengali film

- Theatrical release poster
- Directed by: Swapan Saha
- Written by: Manjil Banerjee
- Screenplay by: Manjil Banerjee
- Story by: Manjil Banerjee
- Produced by: Mukul Sarkar
- Starring: See below
- Cinematography: V Prabhakar
- Edited by: Jayanta Laha
- Music by: Ashok Bhadra
- Distributed by: T Sarkar Productions; Surinder Films
- Release date: 2004
- Running time: 165 minutes
- Country: India
- Language: Bengali

Agni (transl. Fire) is a 2004 Indian Bengali language action film directed by Swapan Saha and produced by Mukul Sarkar. The film features actors Prosenjit Chatterjee and Rachana Banerjee in the lead roles. Music of the film has been composed by Ashok Bhadra. The film is an unofficial remake of the Malayalam-language film Sradha (2000).

== Plot ==
The film is about an honest police officer Agni, whom terrorists are trying to murder but end up killing a number of school children in a school bus. The police officers are very worried about the rising crime rate, and they vow to curb their attempts. Agni is given the charge. Agni, while trying to save people from a terrorist attack in a shopping complex, rescues Tina, who falls in love with him. She later discovers that he is married to Chandrani and even has a son Apu. However, this does not deter her love for him. She keeps on finding ways to go to Agni's house. She also becomes friendly with Apu. One day she takes Apu with her from school without Chandrani's permission. Apu studies in a school owned by Dr. Sayol, who does not have a child.

Meanwhile, Agni succeeds in catching members Pamela and Peter of the terrorist gang. During this time, Agni's son is locked up by the principal of his school, who is thought to be kidnapped. Agni tries his best to find his son but fails. The principal then releases Apu, who is then taken care of by Anu. Meanwhile, the political agents come and kidnap Apu murdering Anu. Agni then agrees to release Pamela and Peter in return for his son. He is asked to go to the airport and place a briefcase laden with bombs. He fights with the gangsters and finally rescues his son. At last, the politician is also put behind bars.

== Cast ==
- Prosenjit Chatterjee as ACP Agni Mukherjee
- Rachana Banerjee as Chandrani, Agni's wife
- Abhishek Chatterjee as Ambar, Agni's brother
- Tapas Paul as Dr. Sajal Vanerjee
- Locket Chatterjee as police officer
- Rajesh Sharma as Peter D'Souza, leader of a terrorist group and the main antagonist
- Nilanjana Sengupta as Tina
- Sonali Chowdhury as Pamela, Peter's aid
- Dulal Lahiri As Agni's father
- Bodhisattwa Majumdar as Central Minister Aditya Sengupta
- Kanchana Maitra as Pinky
- Krisnendu Chatterjee
- Avik Bhattacharya
