= Takkar (2008 film) =

- Directed by: Swapan Saha
- Written by: N.K. Salil; Hari (story)
- Produced by: Subhash Chandra Goel
- Starring: Prosenjit Chatterjee; Rachana Banerjee; Arindam Roy; Barsha Priyadarshini
- Cinematography: Dev Rajan
- Edited by: Suresh Urs
- Music by: Ashok Bhadra
- Production company: Zee Motion Pictures
- Release date: 18 July 2008
- Country: India
- Language: Bengali

Takkar (Bengali: টক্কর) is a 2008 Bengali action drama film directed by Swapan Saha. It stars Prosenjit Chatterjee and Rachana Banerjee in lead roles. Music of the film is composed by Ashok Bhadra and produced by Subhash Chandra Goel.

== Plot ==
Rich suburban girl Chaitali Choudhury marries nephew oriented man Ajoy against the wishes of her elder brother and aunt. But within a couple of months Chaitali and Ajoy go loggerheads over the issue of Ajoy's beloved nephew Arun. Ajoy slaps Chaitali in front of her brother Joydeb's friend Shekhar. Chaitali leaves home even after repeated requests from Ajoy's mother and his widow sister Dipa to stay back. Ajoy transforms to a business tycoon from a poor man after this incident. On the other hand, Chatali is influenced against Ajoy by Joydeb, pisi (her aunt) and Shekhar. 15 years go by. Though the estranged couple still love each other, they can never unite again due to social constraints. Meanwhile, Arun grows up to become a spoilt brat. The uncle-nephew combo remains steady amidst all these mishaps Arun falls in love with Tithi who is accidentally bad man Joydeb's only daughter. There is another positive character in Ranjan who tries to bring peace within the rival families. But Shekhar has another plans. He influenced Joydeb to send a pack of killers to execute Ajoy. Ajoy fights bravely but injured. When Arun hears this news he rushes to kill Joydeb and Shekhar in a fit of rage. But accidentally he chops off poor Ranjan's left hand with a chopper. Things complicate after this incident but when Ranjan withdraws the case over Arun, he takes oath to become a good man and unite his uncle and aunt. Tithi helps Arun wholeheartedly in this mission. Ultimately after numerous violent incidents Joydeb decides to marry off Chaitali by force. At the last moment Ajoy arrives at that spot. Arun too arrives to save his uncle and aunt. Shekhar tries to molest Chaitali while she kills the debauch in self-defence. Arun takes blame and voluntary goes to jail for 4 years. After getting released Ajoy and Arun come to Joydeb's house to take Tithi with them. There every single truth gets revealed. Joydeb and pisi (Arpita Baker) transform into good human beings and the misunderstanding ends finally. Ajoy and Chaitali re-unite after a long gap.

== Cast ==
- Prosenjit Chatterjee as Ajoy
- Arindam Roy as Arun
- Barsha Priyadarshini as Tithi
- Rachana Banerjee as Chaitali Chowdhury
- Bhaswar Chatterjee as Ranjan
- Arpita Becker as Pishi
- Sudip Mukherjee as Joydeb Chowdhury
- Diganta Bagchi as Shekhar, Joydeb's business partner
- Kalyani Mondal as Ajoy's mother
- Subhadra Mukherjee as Dipa, Ajoy's sister
