= Love Circus =

- Directed by: Dulal Bhowmick
- Written by: Dulal Bhowmick
- Produced by: Bijoy Das
- Starring: Arun Bandopadhyay; Ramen Roy Chowdhury; Koushik Banerjee; Laboni Sarkar; Rudranil Ghosh; Rahul
- Music by: Ashok Bhadra
- Release date: 19 February 2010
- Country: India
- Language: Bengali

Love Circus is a 2010 Bengali language romance-drama film written and directed by Dulal Bhowmick.

== Plot ==
Poor Kolkata college student Subhodip develops an obsessive crush on Roma, a spoiled well-connected classmate who repeatedly harms him and his friend Salim, a taxi driver, ultimately causing Subhodip's expulsion from college. Subhodip is sent to jail after he discovers that Roma is engaged, but he manages to escape with the help of the taxi drivers union. He then drugs Roma with chloroform and abducts her, taking her to the jungle with the help of a mysterious man in a gorilla suit. Will Roma's feelings for her captor change? How will her fiancée react to her now-suspect sexual purity after her escape?

== Cast ==
- Arun Bandopadhyay
- Ramen Roy Chowdhury
- Koushik Banerjee
- Laboni Sarkar
- Rudranil Ghosh

== Soundtrack ==
All music is composed by Ashok Bhadra.

No.	Title	Length
1.	"Faita Jai Faita Jai"	03:26
2.	"O Aakash Tumi Bolo"	04:54
3.	"O Bondhu Kothai Tumi"	04:06
4.	"Ore Amar Bhalo Chele"	05:30
5.	"Tomake Chai"	05:15

== Reviews ==
The Times of India refers to the film as "A dash of Dil, a pinch of Saptapadi, sprinkled with the eloping sequence from Qayamat Se Qayamat Tak and a tad of the possessive SRK in Darr." The reviewer criticizes the "terribly illogical" story, the "poor" script, and the song lyrics which "hardly add any zing to the film."
