= Phiriye Dao =

Bengali film

Phiriye Dao is a 1994 Bengali language action drama film directed by Chiranjeet Chakraborty. It was released under the banner of Tirupati films, and featured music composed by Bappi Lahiri.

== Plot ==
Three dacoits attack a police van and loot bank money. A photographer snaps all their faces. While dacoits chase him, the photographer hides in Mr. Choudhury's house. Those dacoits kill Mr. Choudhury and his invalid daughter mercilessly in front of Mrs. Choudhury. Their little son Arjun saves himself by hiding in the garden. Due to this incident his mother gets a paralytic attack. Arjun takes shelter in a Chinese shopkeeper's hut on a nearby hill. He learns martial arts from him and decides to take revenge on the killers. He meets Antara, an actress, and comes to Kolkata to search for the murderers.

== Cast ==
- Chiranjit as Arjun
- Rakhee Gulzar as Mrs. Choudhury, Arjun's mother
- Satabdi Roy as Antara
- Abhishek Chatterjee as Abhi
- Biplab Chatterjee as Chinese man
- Rabi Ghosh
- Pallavi Chatterjee
- Dilip Roy as Mr. Choudhury/Arjun's father
- Dulal Lahiri
- Sreela Majumdar
- Master Rintu as Child Arjun
- Soumitra Banerjee
- Rathin Basu
- Ranjit Bhattacharya
- Gouri Sankar Panda
