= Guru Shisya =

2001 film by Swapan Saha

- Directed by: Swapan Saha
- Starring: Prosenjit Chatterjee; Rituparna Sengupta; Soumitra Chatterjee
- Music by: Babul Bose
- Production company: Silver Vally Communications Ltd.
- Release date: 2001
- Country: India
- Language: Bengali

Guru Shisya is a 2001 Bengali drama film directed by Swapan Saha.

== Cast ==
- Prosenjit Chatterjee as Kishore
- Rituparna Sengupta as Antora
- Soumitra Chatterjee as Shankar Maharaj
- Subhendu Chatterjee
- Subhasish Mukhopadhyay
- Koushik Bandyopadhyay
- Sanjib Dasgupta
- Bina Dasgupta
- Moumita Chakraborty

== Soundtrack ==
All the soundtrack of Guru Shishya (2001) was composed by Babul Bose and lyrics were penned By Goutam Sushmit. It contains 8 songs.

Title	Singer(s)
"Gaan-e Amar Puja (I)"	Bhupinder Singh, Babul Supriyo
"Eshona Aaj Ei Sapoth Kori"	Babul Supriyo, Sadhana Sargam
"Aara Ru Ara Ru"	Udit Narayan, Sadhana Sargam
"Prothom Usha Prothom Dhara"	Sonu Nigam
"Gaan-e Amar Puja" (II)	Babul Supriyo
"Dure Bohu Dure Rakhaliya Sure"	Bhupinder Singh
"Haay Haay Haay"	Udit Narayan, Priya Bhattacharya, Jharna Sengupta
"Rood Chashma Hate Guiter"	Jojo, Priya Bhattacharya, Jharna Sengupta
