= Sabuj Saathi =

- Directed by: Swapan Saha
- Written by: Snehashish Chakraborty
- Screenplay by: Snehashish Chakraborty
- Story by: Shashi
- Produced by: Debendra Kuchar
- Starring: See below
- Edited by: Jayanta Laha
- Music by: Ashok Bhadra
- Production company: Reha Arts Pvt. Ltd.
- Distributed by: Eskay Movies
- Release date: 20 June 2003
- Country: India
- Language: Bengali

Sabuj Saathi (transl. Green Companion) is a 2003 Bengali drama romance film directed by Swapan Saha and produced by Debendra Kuchar. The film features actors Prosenjit Chatterjee and Rachana Banerjee in the lead roles. Music of the film has been composed by Ashok Bhadra.

== Plot ==
Sabuj loves a next door girl Saathi. But eventually Saathi turns out to be his friend Rahul's lover. Sabuj does everything to protect his friend's love. He loses his mother and his family. Facing bitter circumstances Rahul learns the lessons of life. He learns to work on his own and take responsibilities. After 2 years Rahul comes back but only to settle sister's life. Again Sabuj comes to the rescue. He agrees to marry a neural patient to salvage his friend Rahul's love. But destiny played otherwise. Rahul had to marry a girl to salvage her sister's marriage. Sabuj did everything for Sathi but did not tell that he loved her. In the end Sabuj's mother did not tell.

== Cast ==
- Prosenjit Chatterjee as Sabuj
- Rachana Banerjee as Sathi
- Tapas Paul as DSP Subrata Sanyal
- Abhishek Chatterjee as Rahul, Sabuj's best friend and initially Sathi's love interest
- Laboni Sarkar as Sabuj's Mother
- Dulal Lahiri as Pradip Choudhury, Bikash's father
- Subhasish Mukhopadhyay as Arun, Sabuj's friend
- Lokesh Ghosh as Bikash Choudhury
- Bodhisattwa Majumdar as Sabuj's Father
- Arpita Baker as Bimala, Sathi's Mother
- Kalyani Mondal as Rahul and Mita's mother
- Moumita Chakraborty as Mita

== Awards ==
• Kalakar Award for Best Actress – Rachna Banerjee
