= Locket Chatterjee =

Indian film actress and politician (born 1974)

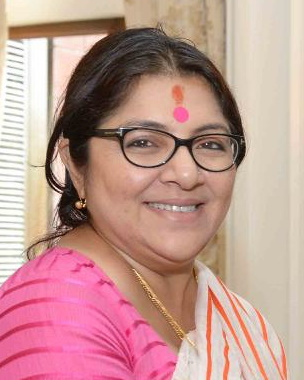
- Chatterjee in 2019

Member of Parliament, Lok Sabha
- In office 23 May 2019 – 4 June 2024
- Preceded by: Ratna De Nag
- Succeeded by: Rachna Banerjee
- Constituency: Hooghly, West Bengal

General Secretary of BJP West Bengal
- Incumbent
- Assumed office 1 June 2020

President of BJP Mahila Morcha, West Bengal
- In office 24 July 2017 – 1 June 2020
- Preceded by: Roopa Ganguly
- Succeeded by: Agnimitra Paul

Member of West Bengal Commission for Women
- In office 2014–2015

Personal details
- Born: 4 December 1974 (age 51) Dakshineswar, West Bengal, India
- Party: Bharatiya Janata Party (since 2015)
- Other political affiliations: Trinamool Congress (till 2015)
- Spouse: Prasenjit Bhattacharjee (m. 1995)
- Education: Jogamaya Devi College, University of Calcutta (B.Sc)
- Occupation: Actress; politician; dancer
- Committees: Member of Standing Committee on Information Technology
- Awards: Kalakar Award
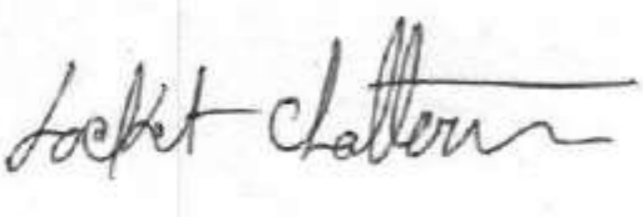
- Signature

Locket Chatterjee (born 4 December 1974) is an Indian actress, politician and former Member of Parliament from Hooghly Lok Sabha constituency of West Bengal. She is also a classical dancer, having completed her training in Bharat Natyam, Kathakali, Manipuri and Creative dance. Chatterjee is better known as an actress in Tollywood. She was previously the state president of BJP Mahila Morcha, the women's wing of the Bharatiya Janata Party in West Bengal. Since then she served as the General Secretary of Bharatiya Janata Party, West Bengal.

== Early life ==
Chatterjee's father Anil Chatterjee was a purohit of Dakshineswar Kali Temple as was her grandfather. Her mother took her to dance school. Chatterjee went abroad with the Mamata Shankar ballet troupe when she was a class VIII student. She grew up by the Maa Ganga (popular as Hooghly) on the northern outskirts of Calcutta's Dakshineswar area.

She later studied at Jogamaya Devi College, affiliated with the University of Calcutta.

== Filmography ==
=== Films ===
- Sannyasi Deshonayok (2020)
- Kiriti Roy (2016)
- Gogoler Kirti (2014)
- Angurlata (upcoming)
- Obhishopto Nighty (2014)
- Kapurush Mohapurush (2013)
- Oh Henry! (2013)
- Chora Bali (2012)
- Jibaner Rang (2012)
- Kayekta Meyer Galpo (2012), directed by Subrata Sen
- Le Halua Le (2012)
- Goraay Gondogol (2012)
- Khokababu (2012)
- Streetlight (2011)
- Gosaibaganer Bhoot (2011)
- Bye Bye Bangkok (2011)
- Hello Memsaheb (2011)
- Uro Chithi (2011)
- Fighter (2011)
- Poran Jaye Jolia Re (2009), as Raj's aunt
- Greptar (2007)
- Chander Bari (2007)
- Minister Fatakeshto (2005)
- Abhimanyu (2006)
- Kranti (2006)
- Debi (2005)
- Shubhodrishti (2005)
- Tyag (2004)
- Badsha the King (2004)
- Agni (2004)
- Paribar (2004)
- Mayer Anchal (2003)
- Ektu Chhoa (2002)

=== Television ===
- Maa Manasha (ETV Bangla)
- Bhalobasha Theke Jaye (ETV Bangla)
- Behula as Sumitra Behula's mother (later replaced by Subhadra Chakraborty Mukherjee) (Star Jalsha)
- Durgeshnandini, a TV adaptation of Bankim Chandra Chattopadhyay's novel, directed by Tarun Majumdar. Locket played the role of Munnibai.

== Awards ==
- Kalakar Awards
- Nominated, Filmfare Award for Best Actor Supporting Role (Female) – Bengali for Nayika Sangbad (directed by Bappaditya Bandopadhyay and edited by Dipak Mandal 2014)

== Political career ==
Chatterjee forayed into politics as a member of All India Trinamool Congress. She severed ties with the Trinamool Congress and joined Bharatiya Janata Party in 2015. She contested 2016 assembly elections from Mayureshwar in West Bengal but lost to Abhijit Roy of AITC. In 2017 she replaced Roopa Ganguly as the president of BJP Mahila Morcha in West Bengal. On 1 June 2020, she was appointed as the General Secretary of the Bharatiya Janata Party, West Bengal and was succeeded by Agnimitra Paul as the President of the BJP Mahila Morcha.

=== Member of Parliament ===
She contested the 2019 Lok Sabha elections from Hooghly Lok Sabha seat against Ratna De and won getting 6,71,448 (46.06%) votes. On 13 September 2019, she was selected as a Member of Standing Committee on Information Technology and since 9 October 2019 onwards, she served as Member of Committee on Empowerment of Women till her tenure ended. In spite of being a sitting MP, in the 2021 West Bengal Legislative Assembly election, she contested from Chuchura Vidhan Sabha seat and lost by a whopping 18,879 votes to AITC candidate Asit Mazumdar.

Subsequently, she failed to regain her constituency and lost to fellow actress, a newcomer to electoral politics, Rachna Banerjee of AITC in the 2024 Indian general election by a margin of 76,853.

== See also ==
- Sonali Chowdhury
- Bidipta Chakraborty
