= Swapan Saha =

Indian Film Director

- Born: 10 January 1930 (age 96); Ajmer, Rajasthan, British India
- Occupations: Film director, Score composer

Swapan Saha (born 10 January 1930) is an Indian film director, producer, story writer and score composer associated with Bengali cinema.

== Filmography ==
- Bedenir Prem (1992)
- Maan Samman (1993)
- Biswas Abiswas (1994)
- Danga (1994)
- Sujan Sakhi (1995)
- Naginkanya (1995)
- Bhai Amar Bhai (1996)
- Jhinukmala (1996)
- Sakhi Tumi Kar (1996)
- Abujh Mon (1996)
- Adarer Bon (1997)
- Kamalar Banabas (1997)
- Bakul Priya (1997)
- Mayer Dibyi (1997)
- Tomake Chai (1997)
- Pita Mata Santan (1997)
- Nishpap Asami (1997)
- Sabar Upare Maa (1997)
- Mayar Badhan (1997)
- Matir Manush (1997)
- Praner Cheye Priyo (1998)
- Nayaner Alo (1998)
- Nag Nagini (1998)
- Gharer Lakshmi (1998)
- Baba Keno Chakar (1998)
- Sundari (1998)
- Shimul Parul (1998)
- Swamir Adesh (1998)
- Tomay Pabo Bole (1999)
- Swamir Ghar (1999)
- Satyam Shivam Sundaram (1999)
- Santan Jakhan Satru (1999)
- Manush Kano Beiman (1999)
- Madhu Malati (1999)
- Kanchanmala (1999)
- Satbhai (2000)
- Gariber Samman (2000)
- Ei Ghar Ei Sansar (2000)Remake from Ei Ghor Ei Songsar 1996
- Bhalobasi Tomake (2000)
- Jabab Chai (2001)
- Guru Shisya (2001)
- Streer Maryada (2002)
- Shatrur Mokabila (2002)
- Kurukshetra (2002)
- Sukh Dukkher Sansar (2003)
- Sneher Protidan (2003)
- Sabuj Saathi (2003)
- Kartabya (2003)
- Guru (2003)
- Tyag (2004)
- Sajani (2004)
- Coolie (2004)
- Annaye Atyachar (2004)
- Agni (2004)
- Rajmohal (2005)
- Debi (2005)
- Agnishapath (2006)
- Swarthopar (2006)
- Shakal Sandhya (2006)
- MLA Fatakeshto (2006)
- Hero (2006)
- Hangama (2006)
- Ghatak (2006)
- Abhimanyu (2006)
- Tiger (2007)
- Minister Fatakeshto (2007)
- Greftaar (2007)
- Takkar (2008)
- Jor (2008)
- Janmadata (2008)
- Golmaal (2008)
- Aamar Pratigya (2008)
- Rajkumar (2008)
- Achena Prem (2011)
- Shrestha Bangali (2017)

=== Producer ===
- Manush Kano Beiman (1999)
