= Ashok Bhadra =

Indian composer

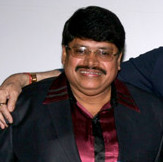
- Ashok Bhadra at the audio release of Bloody Isshq

Background information
- Genres: Film score
- Occupations: Playback singer, Background music composer, Composer, Music director
- Years active: 1995––present

Ashok Bhadra is an Indian composer working in the Bollywood and Bengali film industries. He has also worked for albums like Shudhu Ektu Bhalobasa and Paroshmani.

== Discography ==
=== As a music director ===
- Rakhal Raja (1995)
- Tomake Chai (1997)
- Sabar Upare Maa (1997)
- Nishpap Asami (1997)
- Shimul Parul (1998)
- Naag Nagini (1998)
- Kamalar Banabas (1998)
- Nayaner Alo (1998)
- Madhu Malati (1999)
- Kanchanmala (1999)
- Gariber Raja Robinhood (1999)
- Satbhai (2000)
- Ei Ghar Ei Sansar (2000)
- Bhalobashar Chhoan (2000)
- Suorani Duorani (2001)
- Ostad (2001)
- Jabab Chai (2001)
- Shatrur Mokabila (2002)
- Kurukshetra (2002)
- Sneher Protidan (2003)
- Sabuj Saathi (2003)
- Mayer Anchal (2003)
- Kartabya (2003)
- Tyaag (2004)
- Tista Parer Kanya (2004)
- Sajani (2004)
- Raja Babu (2004)
- Pratishodh (2004)
- Paribar (2004)
- Coolie (2004)
- Badsha The King (2004)
- Agni (2004)
- Sangram (2005)
- Rajmohol (2005)
- Debi (2005)
- Dadar Adesh (2005)
- Chore Chore Mastuto Bhai (2005)
- Bazi (2005)
- Swarthopar (2006)
- Shakal Sandhya (2006)
- Agnipariksha (2006)
- Abhimanyu (2006)
- Shikar (2006)
- Prem(2007)
- Narir Samman (2007)
- Mahaguru (2007)
- Jiban Sathi (2007)
- Aloy Phera (2007)
- Takkar (2008)
- Golmaal (2008)
- Janmadata (2008)
- Blood (2008)
- Rajkumar (2008)
- Chaowa Pawa (2009)
- Ei Prithibi Tomar Aamar (2009)
- Jamai Raja (2009)
- Swartha (2009)
- Bhalobasa Jindabad (2009)
- Phire Pete Chai (2009)
- Bhalobasa Jug Jug Jiyo (2009)
- Bela Sheshe (2009)
- Pratidwandi (2010)
- Love Circus (2010)
- Simanto Periye (2010)
- Bor Bou Khela (2010)
- Joy Baba Bholenath (2010)
- Kakhono Biday Bolo Na (2010)
- Ei Aranya (2011)
- Apon Shatru(2011)
- Bangla Banchao (2011)
- Piya Tumi (2011)
- Run (2011)
- Ogo Bideshini (2011)
- Achena Prem (2011)
- Bhalo Meye Mondo Meye (2011)
- Dujone Milbo Abaar (2011)
- Best Friend (2011)
- Lorai (2011)
- Ki Kore Bojhabo Tomake (2012)
- Phire Eso Tumi (2012)
- "sare chuattor ghoshpara" (2013)
- Bloody Isshq (2013)

=== As a background music composer ===
- Bloody Isshq (2013)
- Love Birds (2011)

=== As a playback singer ===
- Kakhono Biday Bolo Na (2010)

== See also ==
- Debojyoti Mishra
- Anjan Dutt
