= Subhasish Mukherjee =

Indian actor

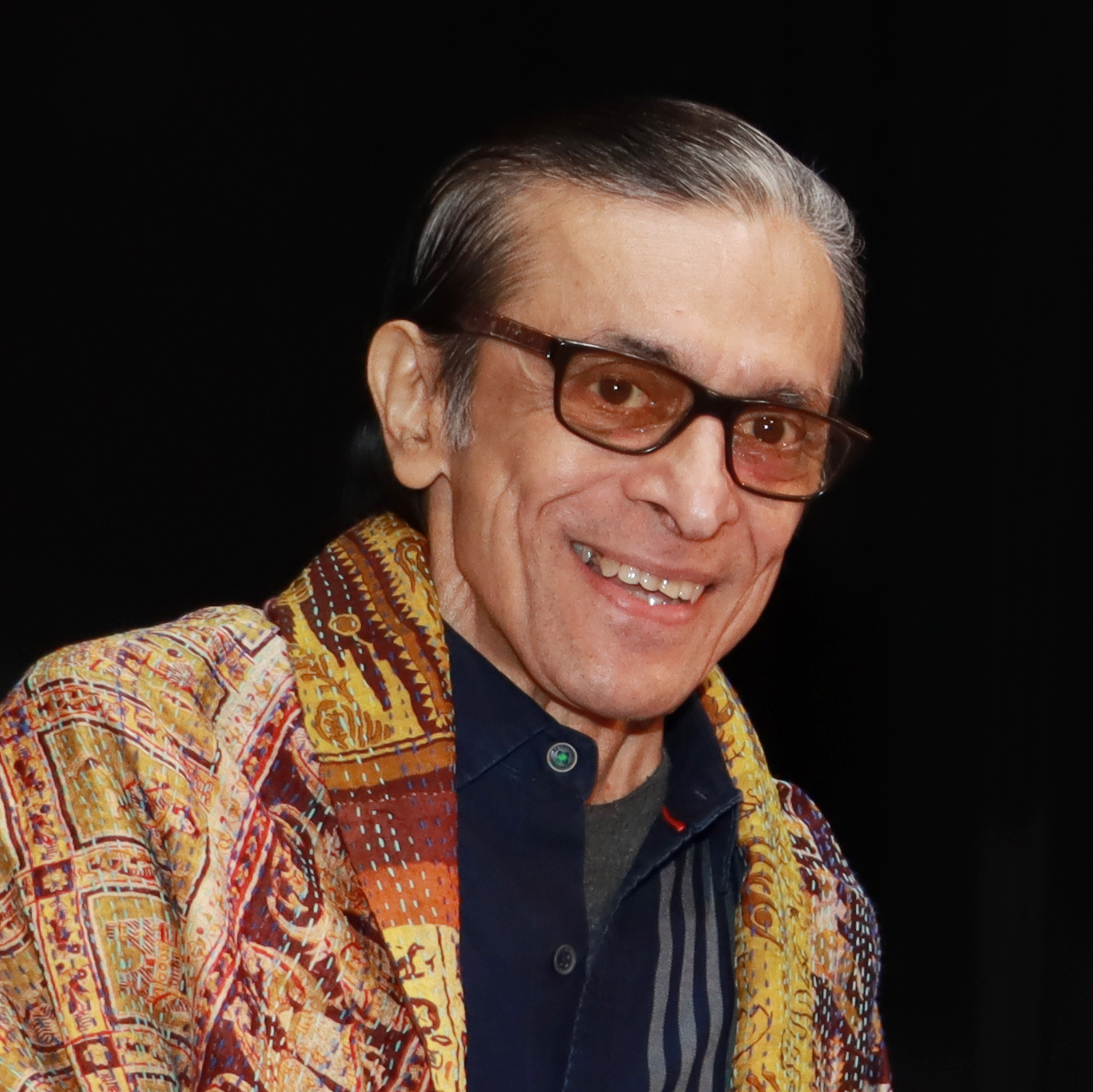
- Mukherjee in 2023
- Born: 5 June 1961; Calcutta, India
- Occupation: Actor
- Years active: 1981–present
- Notable work: Herbert; Meghe Dhaka Tara; Mahalaya; Professor Shonku O El Dorado
- Spouse: Ishita Mukherjee (m. 1986)

Subhasish Mukherjee is an Indian actor who works in Bengali films. He generally appears in comedic and supporting roles, but has proven his versatility as an actor in films like Herbert and Mahalaya. Some of his well-known films include Guru Shisya, Shatrur Mokabila, Surya, Coolie, Greptar and Besh Korechi Prem Korechi. In 2024 the Government of West Bengal conferred him the prestigious "Mahanayak Samman".

== Career ==
He made his debut in 1981 through Purnendu Patri's film Choto Bakulpurer Jatri. In the following years, he became a regular actor in Tollywood. His performance in the Bengali film Herbert was well received by the audience and media, globally. Mukherjee served as the lead actor in the 2011 Bengali fictional movie, Tenida. Some of his other notable works are in the movies Teen Kanya and Meghe Dhaka Tara. Besides, he has acted in several telefilms. He is known for comedic roles in movies like Sasur Bari Zindabad, Streer Maryada, Protisodh, Praner Cheye Priyo, Surya, Akrosh, Dada Thakur, Sakal Sandhya, Besh Korechi Prem Korechi, Mon Mane Na, Saat Pake Bandha, Madhu Malati and many others.

In 2019, he acted in Sandip Ray's Professor Shonku O El Dorado and played the titular role in Birendra Krishna Bhadra's biopic titled Mahalaya. His performance in the latter was critically acclaimed and he had received numerous awards for his portrayal of Birendra Krishna Bhadra in the movie.

== Filmography ==
- Choto Bakulpurer Jatri (1981) - debut film
- Surer Bhubane (1992)
- Koto Bhalobasha(1992)
- Anubhav (1993)
- Kaalpurush (1994)
- Sansar Sangram (1995)
- Ujaan (1995)
- Bhoy (film) (1996)
- Bhai Amar Bhai (1996)
- Sakhi Tumi Kar (1996)
- Bakul Priya (1997)
- Baba Keno Chakor (1998)
- Swamir Adesh (1998)
- Ami Sei Meye (1998)
- Ranokkhetra (1998)
- Amar Maa (1998)
- Santan Jakhon Shatru (1999)
- Sasurbari Zindabad (2000)
- Bhalobasar Chowa (2000)
- Bhalobasi Tomake (2000)
- Har Jeet (2000) as Bhola
- Guru Shisya (2001)
- Dada Thakur (2001)
- Kurukshetra (2002)
- Shatrur Mokabila (2002)
- Sabuj Saathi (2003)
- Rakhe Hari Mare Ke (2003)
- Mayer Anchal (2003)
- Champion (2003) as Kanu
- Aakrosh (2004)
- Kalo Chita (2004)
- Badsha The King (2004)
- Tyaag (2004)
- Sajani (2004)
- Premi (2004)
- Surya (2004) as Shambhu
- Coolie (2004)
- Barood (2004)
- Pratisodh (2004)
- Rajmohol (2005)
- Amu (2005)
- Shakal Sandhya (2005)
- Chore Chore Mastuto Bhai (2005)
- Bazi (2005)
- Shubhodrishti (as Nitai Pondit)(2005)
- Herbert (2006)
- Nayak The Real Hero (2006)
- Eri Naam Prem (2006)
- I Love You (2007)
- Sangharsha (2007)
- Greptar (2007) as Hitler
- Bhalobasa Bhalobasa (2008)
- Mon Mane Na (2008)
- Olot Palot (2009)
- Hangover (2010)
- Export (2010)
- Pratidwandi (2010)
- Mon Chay Tomay (2010)
- Gorosthaney Sabdhan (Feluda movie, 2010) as William Girindranath Biswas
- Tenida (2011)
- Mon Bole Priya Priya (2011)
- Faande Poriya Boga Kaande Re (2011)
- Khokababu (2011)
- Chalo Patol Tuli (2011)
- Haatchhani (2012)
- Awara (2012)
- Baghini Kanya (2012)
- Bangal Ghoti Phataphati (2012)
- Meghe Dhaka Tara (2013)
- Teen Kanya (2012)
- Mrs. Sen (2013)
- Nirbhoya (2013)
- Game (2014)
- Gogoler Kirti (2014)
- Pendulum (2014)
- Arshinagar (2015) as Purohit
- Besh Korechi Prem Korechi (2015) as Tab Shastri
- Hera Pheri (2016)
- Prem Ki Bujhini (2016) as Principal
- Sultan: The Saviour (2018) as Disha's father
- Signature (2018), short film by kolkotha production.
- Mahalaya (as Birendra Krishna Bhadra) (2019)
- Hullor
- Professor Shonku O El Dorado (as Nakur Babu) (2019)
- Paran Bandhu Re (2019)
- Brahma Janen Gopon Kommoti (2020)
- Cholo Potol Tuli (2020)
- Sohorer Upokotha (2021)
- Chabiwala: The Keysmith (2021)
- Habu Chandra Raja Gobu Chandra Montri (2021)
- Hatyapuri (2022)
- Nonte Fonte (2023)
- Chaalchitra Ekhon (2024)
- Oti Uttam (2024)
- Jamalaye Jibonto Bhanu (2024)
- Phonybabu Viral (2026)
- Bike Ambulance Dada (2026)

== Web series ==
List of web series credits
Year	Web series	Role	Director	Platform	Note	Ref.
2020	Tansener Tanpura	Ramnidhi Gosain	Soumik Chattopadhyay	Hoichoi	Web series debut	
2021-2022	Rudrabinar Obhishaap		Joydeep Mukherjee	Hoichoi		
2024–present	Necro		Dip Modak	Fridaay	Debut in lead role	
2025	Khakee: The Bengal Chapter	Shirshendu Das, the Chief Minister of West Bengal	Directed By:Tushar Kanti Roy, Debatma Mandal	Netflix	Hindi web series debut	

== Television appearances ==
List of television credits
Year	Soap opera	Role	Network	Note	Ref.
2014	Byomkesh	Boroda	Colors Bangla	Episodic appearance	
2015	Detective	Jal Mohan Ganguly	Zee Bangla		
2016	Taranath Tantrik	Kapalik	Colors Bangla	Unnamed character	
2016-2017	Jarowar Jhumko	Ajit Karmakar, Jarowa and Jhumko's father	Zee Bangla		
2016-2019	Rakhi Bandhan	Amaresh Chatterjee	Star Jalsha		
2019-2020	Koler Bou	Nakuleshwar Ghatak	Star Jalsha		
2020-2022	Khelaghor	Sarbojit Roy, Ranjit, Ajit and Shantanu's father	Star Jalsha		
2023	Mukut	Paresh Karmakar	Zee Bangla		
2026	Songsarer sangkirtan		Star Jalsha		
