= Dulal Lahiri =

Indian Bengali actor (born 1947)

- Born: 24 August 1947 (age 78); Calcutta, West Bengal, India
- Occupations: Actor, Director

Dulal Lahiri is an Indian actor and director. He has appeared in numerous Bengali films and TV series. He was critically appreciated for his directorial venture Cinemawalla (1993) a Bengali TV series starring Rituparna Sengupta. He introduced Sreelekha Mitra in his directorial venture Balikar Prem.

== Awards ==
Year	Award	Category	Title	Result	Ref.
2022	West Bengal Tele Academy Awards	Best Pair Elderly (male)	Khorkuto	Won	

== Filmography ==
Year	Title	Role	Ref.
1988	Agnisanket		
1990	Chetana		
1991	Ek Pasla Brishti		
1992	Hirer Angti		
1993	Tomar Rakte Aamar Sohag		
1993	Rakter Swad		
1993	Arjun		
1994	Danga		
1994	Kaalpurush		
1994	Katha Chhilo		
1994	Phiriye Dao		
1994	Rakta Nadir Dhara		
1995	Naginkanya		
1995	Prem Sanghat		
1995	Sangharsha		
1995	Sansar Sangram		
1996	Bhoy		
1996	Jhinukmala		
1996	Joy Bijoy		
1996	Lathi		
1996	Pran Sajani		
1996	Rabibar		
1996	Damu		
1996	Sakhi Tumi Kar		
1997	Dus Number Bari		
1997	Gane Bhuban Bhoriye Debo		
1997	Matir Manush		
1997	Nishpap Asami		
1997	Yoddha		
1998	Nayaner Alo		
1998	Kamalar Banabas		
1998	Naag Nagini		
1998	Praner Cheye Priyo		
1998	Ranakshetra		
1998	Shesh Kartabya		
1998	Sundari		
1999	Agnishikha		
1999	Dadabhai		
1999	Gariber Raja Robinhood		
1999	Jugabatar Loknath		
1999	Kanchanmala		
1999	Madhu Malati		
1999	Satyam Shivam Sundaram		
2000	Ei Ghar Ei Sansar		
2000	Kulangar		
2000	Mayna		
2000	Paromitar Ek Din		
2000	Rin Mukti		
2000	Sat Bhai		
2001	Aghat		
2001	Bhalobasar Rajprasade		
2002	Abaidha		
2002	Annadata		
2002	Desh		
2002	Moner Majhe Tumi		
2002	Shyamoli		
2003	Sabuj Saathi		
2003	Sneher Protidan		
2004	Agni		
2004	Badsha The King		
2004	Cooli		
2004	Paribar		
2004	Pratishodh		
2004	Shakti		
2004	Surya		
2004	Tyag		
2005	Agnipath		
2005	Rajmohol		
2005	Sangram		
2006	Bibar		
2006	Hungama		
2006	Abhimanyu		
2006	Agnipariksha		
2006	Agnishapath		
2006	Nayak-The Real Hero		
2006	Praner Swami		
2006	Ranangan		
2006	Sathihara		
2006	Tapasya		
2007	Shudhu Tomar Jonyo		
2007	Bidhatar Lekha		
2007	Krishnakanter Will		
2007	Minister Fatakesto		
2007	Shapmochon		
2008	Aamar Pratigya		
2008	Gharjamai – Amar Banerjee		
2008	Janatar Aadalat		
2009	Mejobabu		
2009	1 No. Plum Villa		
2010	Bejanma		
2010	Love Connection		
2010	Thana Theke Aschi		
2011	Dujone Milbo Abaar		
2011	Aami Aachi Sei Je Tomar		
2011	Iti Mrinalini		
2011	Aami Montri Hobo		
2011	Tomake Chai		
2011	Ek Paloke Ektu Dekha		
2011	Love Birds		
2011	Purna Brahma Sri Sri Harichand		
2012	Ami Achhi Sei Je Tomar		
2012	Sparsho		
2012	Billu Dalal		
2012	10 July		
2012	Chaap - The Pressure		
2012	Mistake		
2012	Prem Unlimited		
2012	Phire Eso Tumi		
2012	Atmatyag		
2012	Zameen– Promod		
2012	Chaal - The Games Begins		
2014	Loafer		
2016	Byomkesh O Chiriyakhana		
2017	Sesh Chithi		
2018	Kushumitar Gappo		
2018	Hoichoi Unlimited		
2019	Jete Nahi Debo		
2021	Abhijaan		
2025	Joto Kando Kolkatatei		

== Television ==
Year	Serial	Role	Channel
2005–2007	Ekdin Pratidin	Gurudev	Zee Bangla
2011–2012	Kanakanjali	Rudra Mitra	Zee Bangla
2012–2013	Care Kori Na	Dr. Subal Majumdar	Star Jalsha
2016–2017	Membou	Shivnath Lahiri	Star Jalsha
2020–2022	Mohor	Anantdev Roy Choudhury	Star Jalsha
2020–2022	Khorkuto	Siddheshwar Mukherjee aka Jethai	Star Jalsha
2022–2023	Ekka Dokka	Yadavendra Majumdar	Star Jalsha
2023–2024	Biyer Phool		Sun Bangla
2023–2024	Jol Thoi Thoi Bhalobasha	Cornell Khastagir	Star Jalsha
2024	Anurager Chhowa		Star Jalsha
2024–2025	Mittir Bari	Sudhacharan Mittir	Zee Bangla
2025–Present	Taare Dhori Dhori Mone Kori	Sridhar Goswami	Zee Bangla
