= Jisshu Sengupta =

Indian actor

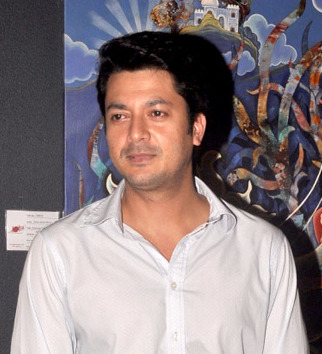
- Sengupta in 2014
- Born: Biswaroop Sengupta; 15 March 1977 (age 49); Calcutta, West Bengal, India
- Occupation: Actor
- Years active: 1999—present
- Works: Full list
- Spouse: Nilanjana Sengupta (m. 2004)
- Children: 2
- Relatives: Anjana Bhowmick (mother-in-law); Chandana Sharma (sister-in-law)

Jisshu Sengupta (born Biswaroop Sengupta; 15 March 1977) is an Indian actor, producer, television presenter, who starts predominantly works in Bengali films alongside a few Hindi and Telugu films.

Sengupta made his debut through a Bengali TV series, Mahaprabhu (1998) where he portrayed the role of Chaitanya Mahaprabhu; the role gained him much recognition. Subsequently, he made his film debut with Priyojon (1999), which became a debacle at the box office. In 2002, he played Rabindranath Tagore in Sukanta Roy's ambitious venture Chelebela alongside Debashree Roy playing Kadambari Devi, following which he appeared in a spate of critically and commercially unsuccessful projects. He made his Bollywood debut with Shyam Benegal's National Award winning film Netaji Subhas Chandra Bose: The Forgotten Hero (2004). A turning point came in his career when he collaborated with Rituparno Ghosh for the latter's Abohomaan, which earned him critical acclaim. His subsequent collaborations with Ghosh for films which include Shob Charitro Kalponik and Noukadubi brought him a higher degree of critical and commercial success. Sengupta's collaborations with other directors for films such as Jaatishwar enabled him to become one of the most sought out actors in Bengali cinema.

Sengupta continued to garner wider attention and further critical acclaim for the role of a contract killer in Rajkahini (2015) and a private detective in Byomkesh Bakshi and its sequel Byomkesh O Chiriyakhana (2016). His biggest commercial success came with the action drama film Zulfiqar (2016), as he continued to draw praise for his performances in Sesh Bole Kichu Nei (2014), Jaatishwar (2014), Kelor Kirti (2016), Posto (2017), Ek Je Chhilo Raja (2018) and Mahalaya (2019).

Apart from films, Sengupta is actively involved in anchoring reality shows and award shows, including Filmfare Awards East (2017). In 2011, he made a comeback on television in the fiction category through Aparajito, which he produced for Star Jalsha.

== Personal life ==
Jisshu Sengupta was born as Biswaroop Sengupta on 15 March 1977 in Calcutta (now Kolkata), West Bengal. He is the son of Ujjwal Sengupta, also an actor in Bengali films. In 2004, he married Nilanjana Sharma, the elder daughter of film actress Anjana Bhowmick. He has two daughters, Sara and Zara.

== Film career ==
=== Initial success and setback ===
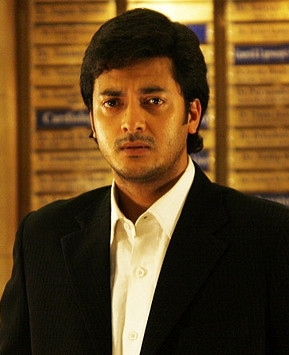
Sengupta in 2007

Sengupta started his career with a teleserial, titled Mahaprabhu, which aired on Doordarshan. He earned critical acclaim for portraying the younger Chaitanya Mahaprabhu in the series. After his part ended in the series, he made his silver screen debut through Priyojon, directed by Dinen Sengupta, which was a critical and commercial failure. In 2002, he played Thakur in Sukanta Roy's ambitious venture Chelebela alongside Debashree Roy playing Kadambari Devi. Thereafter, he appeared in a string of critically and commercially unsuccessful ventures, as main lead. He made his debut in Bangla cinema through Moner Majhe Tumi, appearing as a parallel lead, which was the highest-grossing film of Bangladesh in 2003. He went on playing seconed lead roles in commercial films, namely Abhimanyu, Kurukshetra, Mahaguru, Sangram, Sajani, Guru, Janmadata, Chore Chore Mastuto Bhai and Premi, earning a degree of success. In 2008, he starred in the romantic-comedy film Love and Bor Asbe Ekhuni. He also made his debut in Bollywood through Shyam Benegal's biographical war film Netaji Subhas Chandra Bose: The Forgotten Hero.

=== Collaborations with Rituparno Ghose and success ===
After appearing in critically and commercially unsuccessful films, he met director Rituparno Ghosh, which made Sengupta put more thought into his choice of films. Under Ghosh's tutelage, he gave some of his critically acclaimed performances in films, including The Last Lear, Shob Choritro Kalponik (2008), Chitrangada, and a betrayed husband in Abohoman. Shob Choritro Kalponik also won the National Film Award for Best Feature Film in Bengali in 2009. The Times of India stated that "Jisshu Sengupta, in the role of a junkie, has delivered one of the finest performances of his career." (in Chitrangada: The Crowning Wish).

Sengupta portrayed the protagonist in Noukadubi, alongside Raima Sen, Riya Sen and Prosenjit Chatterjee in an extended guest appearance.

=== Comeback to Hindi cinema and recent work ===
Sengupta made a comeback to Hindi cinema through a cameo appearance in Anurag Basu's directorial Barfi!. Sengupta collaborated with Srijit Mukherji for the latter's musical drama film Jaatishwar co-starring Prosenjit Chatterjee and Swastika Mukherjee. Released on 17 January 2014, the film opened to widespread positive reviews from the critics and was commercially successful. Sengupta played a supporting character in Mardaani, starring Rani Mukherji. In 2015, he portrayed Byomkesh Bakshi in Anjan Dutt's directorial Byomkesh Bakshi. He next collaborated with Srijit Mukherji for the latter's drama film Rajkahini. Both of the films opened to widespread commercial success upon release. His other release in 2015, the musical drama film Arshinagar flopped, though his performance earned critical acclaim. In 2016, he starred in the sequel of Byomkesh Bakshi and Zulfiqar, the former being a commercially and critically successful venture, whereas the latter was only a commercially successful venture, though his performance was critically acclaimed. He was honoured with the Best Actor award for the film Abar Aranye in the 12th Kalakar Awards in 2004 for . He also received a Filmfare Awards East (2017) nomination in Best Actor category for his performance in the former film and won the Star Jalsha Awards for Best Negative Role as well as a nomination for Filmfare Awards East (2017) in the Best Supporting Actor category for the latter. As of now, he acted in Shiboprosad Mukherjee and Nandita Roy's directorial Posto.

He then went on to feature in the film Manikarnika: The Queen of Jhansi (2019), where he played the role of Gangadhar Rao, the king of Jhansi, alongside Kangana Ranaut. The film was a commercial success.

He next featured in Shakuntala Devi, where he played the role of Paritosh Banerji, Shakuntala Devi's husband, with Vidya Balan playing the titular role. The film streamed on Amazon Prime Video in July 2020.

He was then offered a role in Mahesh Bhatt's Sadak 2, where he played the role of Alia Bhatt's father, released in August 2020 in Disney+ Hotstar. Sengupta played ACP Abhay Singh in the horror thriller Durgamati, released in December 2020.

In 2025, Sengupta made his comeback to Bangladeshi cinema after nearly 23 years with Borbaad, co-starring Shakib Khan; having previously appeared in the 2002 film Moner Majhe Tumi.

== Other works ==
=== Television ===
Sengupta is associated with television from the beginning of his career, since he forayed into showbiz with a mythological series based on Chaitanya Mahaprabhu. After almost a decade, he made a comeback to television in the fiction category through his own production, titled Aparajito, which aired on Star Jalsha. Apart from fiction, he has been anchoring many award shows, namely Filmfare Awards East 2017 and non-fiction shows, namely the three sessions of Sa Re Ga Ma Pa: Gaane Gaane Tomar Mone, the Bengali version of Jhalak Dikhhla Jaa and Egiye Bangla. In 2016, he was a judge of Dance Bangla Dance Junior on Zee Bangla.

As of January 2020, Sengupta was hosting two mega-reality television shows for Star Jalsha, Super Singer and Super Singer Junior. In October 2020, Sengupta is hosting a new stand-up comedy series "Hasiwala and Company" in Star Jalsha.

=== Sports ===
Sengupta has been an avid sportsman also, taking part in many sports, most notably cricket, from his childhood days when he used to play the sport in sub-junior games. He was the captain for the Bengal Tigers team, representing Cinema of West Bengal in the Celebrity Cricket League. The Team won Celebrity Cricket League 2024 edition and his cricket skills have been appreciated by many. Bengal Cricket League, which commenced on 26 December 2015 was also the brainchild of Sengupta. Apart from cricket, Sengupta also supported the Kolkata Marathon in the year 2014 along with other celebrities. Over 8,000 participants including elite runners, beginners, fitness enthusiasts, corporate teams and spirited youngsters took part in the ₹10 lakh prize money event held on 8 February 2014. Sengupta also took part in a charity football match for the knee replacement surgery of the Indian football player, Kushumita Das.

== In the media ==
Sengupta was ranked first in the Calcutta Times' Most Desirable Men in its 2015 edition. He gained the 49th position in Times Celebex in July 2015 for the buzz created around his 2015 comedy drama film Piku. He also appeared in Dabboo Ratnani's Bong Calendar 1422, a first of its kind initiative and was presented at the launch event of the calendar. Along with Paoli Dam, he launched the Times Food Guide 2017 at ITC Sonar.

== Awards and nominations ==
Year	Award	Category	Film	Result
2017	2nd Filmfare Awards East	Best Actor	Byomkesh O Chiriyakhana	Nominated
2017	2nd Filmfare Awards East	Best Supporting Actor	Zulfiqar	Nominated
2019	West Bengal Film Journalists' Association Awards	Best Actor in a Leading Role Male	Ek Je Chhilo Raja	Won
2020	West Bengal Film Journalists' Association Awards	Best Actor in a Negative Role	Ghawre Bairey Aaj	Nominated
2020	West Bengal Film Journalists' Association Awards	Best Supporting Actor	Mahalaya	Nominated
2021	9th South Indian International Movie Awards	Best Actor in a Negative Role – Telugu	Bheeshma	Nominated
2022	Bengali Film Festival Chicago	Best Actor	Abhijaan	Won
2023	6th Filmfare Awards Bangla	Best Actor (Critics)	Abhijaan	Won
