= Rachna Banerjee =

Indian actress, entrepreneur and politician

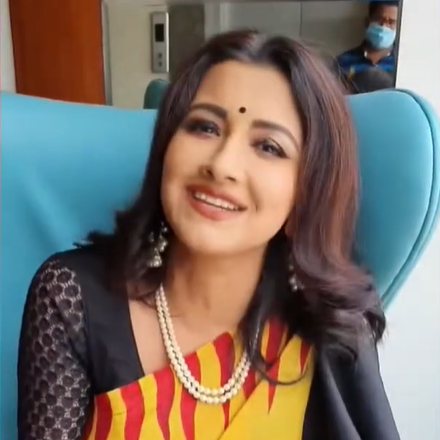
- Banerjee in 2020

Member of Parliament, Lok Sabha
- Incumbent
- Assumed office 4 June 2024
- Preceded by: Locket Chatterjee
- Constituency: Hooghly

Chairperson of Hooghly District Electricity Committee
- Incumbent
- Assumed office 30 October 2026
- Preceded by: Office established

Personal details
- Pronunciation: [ˈrɔt͡ʃonaˑ ˈbɔnd̪opad̪ʱːae̯]
- Born: Jhumjhum Banerjee; 2 October 1972 (age 54) Calcutta (now Kolkata), West Bengal, India
- Party: Nationalist Citizens Party of India (2026–present)
- Other political affiliations: Trinamool Congress (2024—2026)
- Other name: Rachana
- Occupations: Actress; Politician; Television presenter
- Years active: 1990–present
- Notable work: Amodini; Bavagaru Bagunnara?; Sooryavansham; Sabuj Saathi; Shakal Sandhya; Tulkalam; Ramdhanu
- Spouses: Sidhant Mohapatra (m. 1994; div. 2004) Probal Basu (m. 2007; sep. 2016)
- Children: 1
- Beauty pageant titleholder
- Major competitions: Miss Bengal 1990 (Winner); Miss Calcutta 1991 (Winner); Femina Miss India 1992 (Unplaced)

Rachna Banerjee (Note: Bengali pronunciation: [ˈrɔt͡ʃonaˑ ˈbɔnd̪opad̪ʱːae̯].) (Bengali: [ˈrɔt͡ʃonaˑ ˈbɔnd̪opad̪ʱːae̯]; born Jhumjhum Banerjee; 2 October 1972), also credited mononymously as Rachana, is an Indian actress, politician, entrepreneur and television presenter. She is known primarily for her works in Bengali and Odia films, besides a few Telugu, Tamil, and Kannada films.

Being crowned the 1991 Miss Kolkata, she has also won five other beauty contests in India including Miss Beautiful Smile at the Miss India contest. Since June 2024, she has been serving as the Member of Parliament for Hooghly (Lok Sabha constituency) from West Bengal.

== Early life ==
Banerjee was born on 2 October 1972 in Calcutta (now Kolkata), West Bengal, and was her parents' only child. Her father was Rabindranath Banerjee. Her name at birth, Jhumjhum Banerjee, was changed to Rachana by Sukhen Das, the director of her debut film Daan Pratidaan (1993). She completed her higher secondary education from National Girls' High School.

== Career ==
=== Modelling career (1991–1992) ===
Banerjee won the Miss Kolkata contest in 1991 when she was still in her second year of graduation course from South City College. She entered several beauty pageants before starting her acting career and was often declared 'Miss Beautiful Smile'. In 1992 she missed out of the Miss India contest grand finale where Madhu Sapre was crowned with the title.

=== Acting career (1993–2017) ===
Sukhen Das chose Banerjee for the female lead in his directorial venture Dan Pratidan (1993). He changed her name to Rachana (which Das found in 'Rabindra Rachanabali'). Rachana has done around 45 Oriya movies to date. She appeared alongside Amitabh Bachchan in the film Sooryavansham, one of the cult movies of its era.

=== Hosting Didi No. 1 ===
Apart from acting, Banerjee also hosted the Bengali non-fiction TV show Didi No. 1 which airs on Zee Bangla on weekdays. On 5 April 2013 a fire broke out in the studio of Didi No. 1 at Tollygunge, and she fainted following a panic attack and was rushed to a city hospital. On 25 June 2026, she has been replaced by Swastika Mukherjee in the TV show.

== Personal life ==
Rachna Banerjee married her co-star Sidhant Mohapatra and divorced him in 2004. She married Probal Basu in 2007 and separated from him in 2016. They have a son.

== 2026 Rebellion ==
In June 2026, almost immediately after the massive Trinamool Congress defeat, around 20 MPs of TMC including Yusuf Pathan, Saayoni Ghosh, Shatrughan Sinha, Bapi Halder, Mala Roy, Mitali Bag, Deepak Adhikari, Arup Chakraborty, Sharmila Sarkar, Satabdi Roy, Rachna Banerjee, Prasun Banerjee and others, allegedly declared rebellion from their party, and presented their written wish to join Bhartiya Janata Party. This group was led by Kakoli Ghosh.

Later, on 14 June, 20 MPs, including Rachna, signed a formal letter declaring their split from Trinamool Congress to merge with the Nationalist Citizens Party of India (NCPI). They formally submitted the letter to Lok Sabha Speaker Om Birla.

The total strength of TMC in Lok Sabha had been 28, so that a number of 20 MPs made it eligible for splitting from the Party, as per the Indian Defection laws, so as to escape the anti-defection disqualification.

== Controversy ==
Banerjee made a remark that she is the only actress from Bengal to have worked with Amitabh Bachchan. Her statement overlooking the long list of Bengali actresses who had already acted with Bachchan in several Hindi films. In the social networking media, many people criticized the statement as historically inaccurate and false.

== Filmography ==
=== List of reality shows ===
Year	Show	Season	Role	Ref
2010	Dance Bangla Dance - Junior	7	Judge	
2011	Didi No. 1	2	Anchor	
2013	Didi No. 1	4	Anchor	
2015	Didi No. 1	6	Anchor	
2016	Didi No. 1	7	Anchor	
2018	Didi No. 1	8	Anchor	
2022	Didi No. 1	9	Anchor	
2016	No 1 Didi Na Dada	1	Anchor	
2012	Tumi Je Amar	1	Anchor	
2018	Dance Bangla Dance - Junior, Season 10		Judge	

== Awards ==
- 2004: Kalakar Award for Best Actress for Sabuj Saathi
- Bharat Nirman Award
- Odia State Film Award
- Special Film Award by West Bengal State Govt
- Tele Samman Award
- ETV Bangla Film Award
- Zee Bangla Sonar Songsar Award 2015: Best anchor for Tumi Je Amar
- Tele Cine Award 2013-17: Best Anchor for Didi No. 1
- IBFA - International Bengali Film Award 2018: Contribution in the Field of Film and Television Award for her spectacular contribution.
- Mahanayak Samman
- West Bengal Tele Academy Awards 2025: Best Anchor for Didi No. 1

== Political career ==
Banerjee joined the Trinamool Congress in 2024. She contested from the Hooghly Lok Sabha constituency seat against Bharatiya Janata Party's sitting M. P. Locket Chatterjee in the 2024 Indian general election, and won the elections by a margin of 76,853 votes.
