= Tapan Das =

Indian actor

- Born: 11 January 1962 (age 64); Guwahati, Assam, India
- Occupations: Actor, director, writer
- Years active: 1980–present
- Spouse: Purabi Sarma

Tapan Das (born 11 January 1962) is an Indian film actor, director and story writer in Assamese cinema and mobile theatre. He also performs in stage plays.

== Early life ==
Das was born on 11 January 1962 in Guwahati. He has been associated with acting since early 80s when he was in high school. His father was an officer at PWD department in Assam, was frequently transferred from one place to another. So he had studied in different schools of Assam. He studied in the prestigious Assam Engineering College, as said himself in an Interview. He became a popular actor by doing various stage plays in Guwahati.

== Career ==
Das made his debut in Assamese film through Pulak Gogoi's Sendoor in 1984. Till now he has acted in more than 20 Assamese films. Apart from films, Das has been also involved in mobile theatres (Bhramyaman). He has acted in Kohinoor, Bordoisila, Shakuntala Theatre, Rajtilak Theatre and Theatre Surjya. He also did direction in the above theatres and Hengool Theatre. In 2011, he signed in Rajtilak Theatre. After that he has been associated with Theatre Surjya.

== Filmography ==
| Year | Film | Director |
|---|---|---|
| 1984 | Sendoor | Pulak Gogoi |
| 1984 | Shakuntala Aru Sankar Joseph Ali | Nip Barua |
| 1985 | Suruj | Pulak Gogoi |
| 1985 | Puja | Dara Ahmed |
| 1986 | Sankalpa | Hema Bora |
| 1987 | Sutrapat | Mridul Gupta |
| 1988 | Pita-Putra | Munin Barua |
| 1990 | Pahari Kanya | Munin Barua |
| 1990 | Abhiman | Mridul Gupta |
| 1992 | Prabhati Pokhir Gaan | Munin Barua |
| 1993 | Dristi | Atul Bordoloi |
| 1993 | Abarton | Bhabendra Nath Saikia |
| 1995 | Itihas | Bhabendra Nath Saikia |
| 1998 | Krishnachura | Mridul Gupta |
| 2001 | Daag | Munin Barua |
| 2002 | Gun Gun Gaane Gaane | Bidyut Chakravarty |
| 2002 | Kanyadaan | Munin Barua |
| 2004 | Barood | Munin Barua |
| 2004 | Dinabandhoo | Munin Barua |
| 2004 | Anuraag | Bidyut Chakravarty |
| 2004 | Antaheen Jatra | Munna Ahmed |
| 2005 | Kadamtole Krishna Nache | Suman Haripriya |
| 2005 | Astaraag | Shiva Prasad Thakur |
| 2006 | Aghari Atma | Munna Ahmed |
| 2011 | Raamdhenu | Munin Barua |
| 2012 | Samiran Barua Ahi Ase | Prodyut Kumar Deka |
| 2012 | Surjasta | Prodyut Kumar Deka |
| 2015 | Ahetuk | Bani Das |
| 2022 | Rajneeti - Part 1 | Manujit Sharma |
| 2024 | Wide Angle | Jayanta Nath |

=== Published books ===
- Meghamallāra (2008)
- Dīghalā Baruwāra dālāna (1994)

== Awards ==
- 2012 - Rupkar Award
