= Punko =

Punko (Пунько) is a Russian surname and may refer to:

== Surname ==
- Sergey Punko (born 1981), Belarus-born Russian swimmer
- Anna Punko (born 1989), Russian handball player

== Given name ==
- Punko, stage name of David N. Donihue (born 1974), American writer, director and actor
