= Wide Angle (film) =

- Directed by: Jayanta Nath
- Screenplay by: Pankajjyoti Bhuyan
- Story by: Nagen Saikia
- Produced by: Debajyoti Bora
- Starring: Zubeen Garg; Tapan Das; Aparna Dutta Choudhury; Pabitra Baruah; Jolly Laskar; Dipankar Roy; Dhyani Mohan
- Cinematography: Sumon Dowerah
- Edited by: Debojit Dutta
- Production companies: Swavalamban Media and Entertainment
- Release date: 22 March 2024
- Country: India
- Language: Assamese

Wide Angle is an Assamese language film directed by Jayanta Nath and produced by Debajyoti Bora under the banner of Swavalamban Media and Entertainment. The story is based on Assamese author Nagen Saikia's story "Staff Photographeror Sobi" which evolves around a photographer from the time of the Assam Movement.

== Cast ==
- Tapan Das
- Aparna Dutta Choudhury
- Pabitra Baruah
- Jolly Laskar
- Zubeen Garg
- Dipankar Roy
- Dhyani Mohan

== Soundtrack ==
Wide Angle

Soundtrack album by Jayanta Nath
- Released: 12 March 2024
- Genre: Feature film soundtrack
- Language: Assamese
- Label: Telescope Records

Jayanta Nath chronology
Karma Ke Rati (2013)	Wide Angle (2024)

Music director of the film was Jayanta Nath. FIrst single "Joi Aai Axom" sung by Zubeen Garg was released on 23 November 2023. It is composed by Jayanta Nath, Lyrics by Jetabon Baruah and music produced by Shyamal Bhuyan.

== Release ==
The film released on 22 March 2024 in the theatres of Assam.
