= 53rd National Film Awards =

2007 Indian film award

- Awarded for: Best of Indian cinema in 2005
- Awarded by: Directorate of Film Festivals
- Presented by: Pratibha Patil (President of India)
- Announced on: 7 August 2007
- Presented on: 14 September 2007
- Site: Vigyan Bhavan, New Delhi
- Official website: dff.nic.in

Highlights
- Best Feature Film: Kaalpurush
- Best Non-Feature Film: Riding Solo to the Top of the World
- Best Book: Kundan
- Best Film Critic: Baradwaj Rangan
- Dadasaheb Phalke Award: Shyam Benegal
- Most awards: Rang De Basanti (4)

The 53rd National Film Awards, presented by Directorate of Film Festivals, the organisation set up by Ministry of Information and Broadcasting, India to felicitate the best of Indian Cinema released in the year 2005.

The selection process of 53rd National Film Awards began with the constitution of three Juries for feature film, non-feature film and best writing on cinema sections, which were declared on 28 July 2006. B. Saroja Devi, an yesteryear's actress, headed the feature film Jury, which had eleven other members. A documentary maker and Indian television personality Siddharth Kak headed the six-member non-feature film Jury. The Jury for best writing on cinema was headed by veteran film critic Khalid Mohamed.

The final announcement of awards was much delayed due to various controversies associated with them. Actual announcement was done almost after the 14th months of its expected announcement, after Delhi High Court gave green signal to announce the awards in all categories. Awards were scheduled to be declared on 12 May 2006.

Awards were announced by each committee chairpersons on 7 August 2007 and ceremony took place at Vigyan Bhavan, New Delhi on 14 September 2007 and awards were given President of India, Pratibha Patil. It was also announced that prize money would be increased by five times and more categories would be added from next year.

== Awards ==
Awards were divided into feature films, non-feature films and books written on Indian cinema.

=== Lifetime Achievement Award ===
Name of Award	Image	Awardee(s)	Awarded As	Awards
Dadasaheb Phalke Award		Shyam Benegal	Director	Swarna Kamal, ₹ 2,00,000 and a Shawl

=== Feature films ===
Feature films were awarded at All India as well as regional level. For 53rd National Film Awards, a Bengali film, Kaalpurush won the National Film Award for Best Feature Film; whereas a Hindi film, Rang De Basanti, won the maximum number of awards (4). Following were the awards given in each category:

==== Juries ====
A committee headed by B. Saroja Devi was appointed to evaluate the feature films awards. Following were the jury members:

- Jury Members
  - B. Saroja Devi (Chairperson) • P. H. Vishwanath • Katte Ramachandra • B. S. Loknath • Seema Biswas • P. Sudershan
  - Shyamaprasad • Shyamali Deb Banerjee • Meena Debbarma • Anwar Ali • Ina Puri • Ashok Saran

==== All India Award ====
Following were the awards given:

===== Golden Lotus Award =====
Official Name: Swarna Kamal

All the awardees are awarded with 'Golden Lotus Award (Swarna Kamal)', a certificate and cash prize.

Name of Award	Name of Film	Language	Awardee(s)	Cash prize
Best Feature Film	Kaalpurush - Memories In The Mist	Bengali	Producer: Jhamu Sughand; Director: Buddhadeb Dasgupta	₹ 50,000/- Each
Best Feature Film	Citation: For a rare lyrical style and a unique cohesion of narrative structure and characters that allow it to flow on different planes.			
Best Debut Film of A Director	Parineeta	Hindi	Producer: Vidhu Vinod Chopra; Director: Pradeep Sarkar	₹ 25,000/- Each
Best Debut Film of A Director	Citation: For the competent directorial style to recreate a classic novel with modern cinematic sensibilities.			
Best Popular Film Providing Wholesome Entertainment	Rang De Basanti	Hindi	Producer: UTV Motion Pictures and Rakeysh Omprakash Mehra Pictures (P) Ltd. Director: Rakeysh Omprakash Mehra	₹ 20,000/- Each
Best Popular Film Providing Wholesome Entertainment	Citation: For invoking a touching tale of love highlighting the importance of human relationship above man-made boundaries.			
Best Popular Film Providing Wholesome Entertainment	Shubhodrishti	Bengali	Producer: Rajshri Productions and Shree Venkatesh Films; Director: Prabhat Roy	₹ 20,000/- Each
Best Popular Film Providing Wholesome Entertainment	Citation: For invoking nostalgia in a manner that is powerful yet poetic.			
Best Children's Film	The Blue Umbrella	Hindi	Producer: UTV Motion Pictures; Director: Vishal Bhardwaj	₹ 30,000/- Each
Best Children's Film	Citation: For its poetic and visually stunning interpretation of a story highlighting the values of selflessness and compassion.			
Best Direction	Parzania	English	Rahul Dholakia	₹ 50,000/-
Best Direction	Citation: For the compelling documentation of contemporary human lives trapped in difficult times of communal hatred and violence.			

===== Silver Lotus Award =====
Official Name: Rajat Kamal

All the awardees are awarded with 'Silver Lotus Award (Rajat Kamal)', a certificate and cash prize.

Name of Award	Name of Film	Language	Awardee(s)	Cash prize
Best Feature Film on National Integration	Daivanamathil	Malayalam	Producer: Aryadan Shoukath; Director: Jayaraj	₹ 30,000/- Each
Best Feature Film on National Integration	Citation: For the powerful representation of a burning communal issue highlighting the plight of women in the times of religious intolerence.			
Best Film on Family Welfare	Thavamai Thavamirundhu	Tamil	Producer: P. Shanmugam; Director: Cheran	₹ 30,000/- Each
Best Film on Family Welfare	Citation: For the evocative portrayal of a family caught in trials and tribulations in a simple narrative style.			
Best Film on Other Social Issues	Iqbal	Hindi	Producer: Subhash Ghai; Director: Nagesh Kukunoor	₹ 30,000/- Each
Best Film on Other Social Issues	Citation: For its inspiring and cinematically energetic portrayal of a hearing impaired in his aspiration to become a champion cricketer.			
Best Film on Environment / Conservation / Preservation	Thutturi	Kannada	Producer: Jaimala Ramchandra; Director: P. Sheshadri	₹ 30,000/- Each
Best Film on Environment / Conservation / Preservation	Citation: For its imaginative portrayal of a group of young children who fight to preserve a healthy urban environment.			
Best Actor	Black	• Hindi • English	Amitabh Bachchan	₹ 10,000/-
Best Actor	Citation: For his dramatic rendition of reformed alcoholic who struggles to give a physically handicapped child a new life.			
Best Actress	Parzania	English	Sarika	₹ 10,000/-
Best Actress	Citation: For her rendition of a crusading mother who fights for justice against all a diversity in a communally charged environment.			
Best Supporting Actor	Iqbal	Hindi	Naseeruddin Shah	₹ 10,000/-
Best Supporting Actor	Citation: For his competent depiction of an endearing man who finds it difficult to give up his addiction to alcohol but still emerges vicarious as his protégé the young village lad conquers his dream.			
Best Supporting Actress	Achuvinte Amma	Malayalam	Urvashi	₹ 10,000/-
Best Supporting Actress	Citation: For the highly credible performance of a brave woman who pledges her life and love for an adopted child.			
Best Child Artist	Bommalata – A Bellyful of Dreams	Telugu	Sai Kumar	₹ 10,000/-
Best Child Artist	Citation: For his haunting performance as a child who realises his burning desire to access school education.			
Best Male Playback Singer	Rang De Basanti ("Roo Ba Roo")	Hindi	Naresh Iyer	₹ 10,000/-
Best Male Playback Singer	Citation: For his melodious rendering of a lilting song that adds exuberance to the film.			
Best Female Playback Singer	Paheli ("Dheere Jalna")	Hindi	Shreya Ghoshal	₹ 10,000/-
Best Female Playback Singer	Citation: For her evocative rendition of a song that treads the fine balance between the classical and popular genre of Hindi film music.			
Best Cinematography	Sringaram	Tamil	Cameraman: Madhu Ambat; Laboratory Processing: Prasad Film Laboratories	₹ 10,000/- Each
Best Cinematography	Citation: For the technical brilliance which is evident in the framing, lighting and execution throughout the film.			
Best Screenplay	Apaharan	Hindi	• Prakash Jha • Shridhar Raghavan • Manoj Tyagi	₹ 10,000/-
Best Screenplay	Citation: For creating a crisp screenplay that is riveting and renders pace to the entire film.			
Best Audiography	Rang De Basanti	Hindi	Nakul Kamte	₹ 10,000/-
Best Audiography	Citation: For creating a vibrant sound design that effectively supports the graph of the film.			
Best Editing	Rang De Basanti	Hindi	P. S. Bharati	₹ 10,000/-
Best Editing	Citation: For creating a commendable pace and multi-layered visual design that heightens the impact of the film.			
Best Art Direction	Taj Mahal: An Eternal Love Story	Hindi	C. B. More	₹ 10,000/-
Best Art Direction	Citation: For effectively recreating the mughal period and rendering life to an era.			
Best Costume Design	Taj Mahal: An Eternal Love Story	Hindi	Anna Singh	₹ 5,000/- Each
Best Costume Design	Citation: For creating costumes true to the spirit of a period film.			₹ 5,000/- Each
Best Costume Design	Black	Hindi and English	Sabyasachi Mukherjee	₹ 5,000/- Each
Best Costume Design	Citation: For his imaginative creations that enhanced the mood and added to ambience of the film.			₹ 5,000/- Each
Best Music Direction	Sringaram	Tamil	Lalgudi Jayaraman	₹ 10,000/-
Best Music Direction	Citation: For bringing alive an era of great musical and dance tradition through the deft use of Indian musical instruments.			
Best Lyrics	Thaayi ("Barutheve Naav Barutheve")	Kannada	Baraguru Ramachandrappa	₹ 10,000/-
Best Lyrics	Citation: For the lyric "Barutheve Naav Barutheve" in the Kannada film Thaayi which heightened the effect of the entire film.			
Best Special Effects	Anniyan	Tamil	Tata Elxsi	₹ 10,000/-
Best Special Effects	Citation: For highly imaginative and creative special effects that lift the style of the film.			
Best Choreography	Sringaram	Tamil	Saroj Khan	₹ 10,000/-
Best Choreography	Citation: For authentic recreation of the devdasi tradition that has been brought out with immense grace and beauty.			
Special Jury Award	Maine Gandhi Ko Nahin Mara	Hindi	Anupam Kher (Actor)	₹ 25,000/-
Special Jury Award	Citation: For an outstanding performance in the film that brings alive the plight of an Alzheimer's patient who is alienated from the real world.			

==== Regional Awards ====
The award is given to best film in the regional languages in India.

Name of Award	Name of Film	Awardee(s)	Cash prize
Best Feature Film in Assamese	Kadamtole Krishna Nache	Producer: Suman Haripriya; Director: Suman Haripriya	₹ 20,000/- Each
Best Feature Film in Assamese	Citation: For its attempt at preserving the dying culture and traditions of Assam.		
Best Feature Film in Bengali	Herbert	Producer: Kajal Bhattacharya and Abanti Chakraborty; Director: Suman Mukhopadhyay	₹ 20,000/- Each
Best Feature Film in Bengali	Citation: For a refreshingly cinematic idiom as the protagonist of this urban existential tragicomedy veers between the real and the surreal.		
Best Feature Film in Hindi	Black	Producer: Anshuman Swami and Sanjay Leela Bhansali; Director: Sanjay Leela Bhansali	₹ 20,000/- Each
Best Feature Film in Hindi	Citation: For a stylised and visually vibrant tale of a physically challenged child who learns to live and become an achiever against insurmountable odds.		
Best Feature Film in Kannada	Thaayi	Producer: Prameela Joshai; Director: Baraguru Ramachandrappa	₹ 20,000/- Each
Best Feature Film in Kannada	Citation: For its contemporary interpretation of Maxim Gorky's classic novel against injustice and oppression.		
Best Feature Film in Malayalam	Thanmathra	Producer: Century Films; Director: Blessy	₹ 20,000/- Each
Best Feature Film in Malayalam	Citation: For the moving depiction of a middle – class family which struggles to lead a dignified life in the face of the house holder's gradual loss of memory.		
Best Feature Film in Marathi	Dombivali Fast	Producer: Ramakant Gaikwad; Director: Nishikant Kamat	₹ 20,000/- Each
Best Feature Film in Marathi	Citation: For its portrayal of an urban middle class man who breaks down under tremendous stress and pressures of life in a corrupt modern city.		
Best Feature Film in Odia	Kathantara	Producer: Iti Samanta; Director: Himanshu Khatua	₹ 20,000/- Each
Best Feature Film in Odia	Citation: For seeking to re-establish Indian family values in the modern day situation.		
Best Feature Film in Punjabi	Baghi	Producer: Gaj Deol; Director: Sukhminder Dhanjal	₹ 20,000/- Each
Best Feature Film in Punjabi	Citation: For graphically delineating the caste divide in modern day Punjab.		
Best Feature Film in Tamil	Aadum Koothu	Producer: Light and Shadow Movie Makers; Director: T. V. Chandran	₹ 20,000/- Each
Best Feature Film in Tamil	Citation: For its imaginative portrayal of a young girl who travels between past and present time zones.		
Best Feature Film in Telugu	Bommalata - A Bellyful Of Dreams	Producer: K. Raghavendra Rao; Rana Daggubati Director: Prakash Kovelamudi	₹ 20,000/- Each
Best Feature Film in Telugu	Citation: For cinematically vibrant rendition of the story of an underprivileged through the medium of puppetry and magic.		

Best Feature Film in Each of the Language Other Than Those Specified In the Schedule VIII of the Constitution

Name of Award	Name of Film	Awardee(s)	Cash prize
Best Feature Film in Bhojpuri	Kab Hoi Gawna Hamar	Producer: Deepa Narayan; Director: Anand D. Ghatraj	₹ 20,000/- Each
Best Feature Film in Bhojpuri	Citation: For a family drama that harks back to traditional values and modern day sensibilities.		
Best Feature Film in English	15 Park Avenue	Producer: Bipin Kumar Vohra; Director: Aparna Sen	₹ 20,000/- Each
Best Feature Film in English	Citation: For its effective and intense portrayal of a schizophrenic girl who seeks a dream world that may or may not even exist.		
Best Feature Film in Monpa	Sonam	Producer: Garima Films; Director: Ahsan Muzid	₹ 20,000/- Each
Best Feature Film in Monpa	Citation: For picturesque effective portrayal of the contemporary tribal life.		

=== Non-Feature Films ===
Films made in any Indian language shot on 16 mm, 35 mm or in a wider gauge or digital format and released on either film format or video/digital but certified by the Central Board of Film Certification as a documentary/newsreel/fiction are eligible for non-feature film section.

==== Juries ====
A committee headed by Siddharth Kak was appointed to evaluate the non-feature films awards. Following were the jury members:

- Jury Members
  - Siddharth Kak (Chairperson) • Chinmoya Nath • Sangeeta Tamuli • Kishore Dang • Kireet Khurana • A. B. Tripathi

==== Golden Lotus Award ====
Official Name: Swarna Kamal

All the awardees are awarded with 'Golden Lotus Award (Swarna Kamal)', a certificate and cash prize.

Name of Award	Name of Film	Language	Awardee(s)	Cash prize
Best Non-Feature Film	Riding Solo to the Top of the World	English	Producer: Gaurav A. Jani and P. T. Giridhar Rao of M/s. Dirtrack Productions; Director: Gaurav A. Jani	₹ 20,000/- Each
Best Non-Feature Film	Citation: Made in the best tradition of Cinema verity, personal, vivid and natural. The film leads the viewer from revelation to revelation giving us an opportunity to come to love and know the "Changpas" and their unique lifestyle.			
Best Non-Feature Film Direction	Voices Across the Oceans	English and Hindi	Ganesh Shankar Gaikwad	₹ 10,000/- Each
Best Non-Feature Film Direction	Citation: This sensitive film uses simple, masterly non-linear storytelling to take us through a nostalgic journey of BBC's association with India's key defining moments in the nation's history.			

==== Silver Lotus Award ====
Official Name: Rajat Kamal

All the awardees are awarded with 'Silver Lotus Award (Rajat Kamal)' and cash prize.

Name of Award	Name of Film	Language	Awardee(s)	Cash prize
Best First Non-Feature Film	John and Jane	English	Producer: Ashim Ahluwalia; Director: Ashim Ahluwalia	₹ 10,000/- Each
Best First Non-Feature Film	Citation: For an evocative film capturing the essence of call centres in urban India, its pressures and the dualities of life in this new reality.			
Best Anthropological / Ethnographic Film	Spirit Of The Graceful Lineage	English	Producer: Bibi Devi Barbarooah; Director: Prerana Barbarooah Sharma	₹ 10,000/- Each
Best Anthropological / Ethnographic Film	Citation: For an interesting documentation of the unique matrilineal society of the Khasis of Meghalaya.			
Best Biographical Film and Best Historical Reconstruction / Compilation Film (Jointly given)	Hans Akela - Kumar Gandharva	Hindi	Producer: Films Division; Director: Jabbar Patel	₹ 10,000/- Each
Best Biographical Film and Best Historical Reconstruction / Compilation Film (Jointly given)	Citation: For a film made with a deep sense of understanding of classical Music. This well researched film sensitively evokes the unique personality and contribution of Kumar Gandharva and shows the human face of his outstanding creativity.			
Best Arts / Cultural Film	Naina Jogin	Hindi and Maithili	Producer: Praveen Kumar; Director: Praveen Kumar	₹ 10,000/- Each
Best Arts / Cultural Film	Citation: For a seamless film aesthetically blending fact, fiction and reconstruction with perceptive interviews bringing out the life of the Madhubani painters of Bihar.			
Best Scientific Film / Best Environment / Conservation / Preservation Film	Under This Sun	Bengali	Producer: Nilanjan Bhattacharya; Director: Nilanjan Bhattacharya	₹ 10,000/- Each
Best Scientific Film / Best Environment / Conservation / Preservation Film	Citation: For a thought provoking film on environmental diversity with excellent Cinematography, Music, Editing and Sound Design.			
Best Agriculture Film	Seed Keepers	Telugu and English	Producer: Rajiv Mehrotra; Director: Farida Pacha	₹ 10,000/- Each
Best Agriculture Film	Citation: For its simple, honest portrayal of the lives of the women farmers in Andhra Pradesh and their need for addressing pertinent issues through self-empowerment using media and Technology.			
Best Film on Social Issues	Way To Dusty Death	Hindi and English	Producer: Rajiv Mehrotra; Director: Sayed Fayaz	₹ 10,000/- Each
Best Film on Social Issues	Citation: For a Film on a little known subject that stirs the conscience and emotionally involves the viewers in the lives of the workers.			
Best Investigative Film	The Whistle Blowers	English	Producer: Rajiv Mehrotra; Director: Umesh Aggarwal	₹ 10,000/- Each
Best Investigative Film	Citation: For a small film with a big impact! In the best traditions of Investigative reportage, the film highlights the burning issue of hazards to health and pollution norms.			
Best Animation Film	Kachua Aur Khargosh	Hindi	Producer: Ramesh Sharma and Uma Gajapati Raju; Director: C. B. Arun; Animator: Moving Picture Company Animation team	₹ 10,000/- Each
Best Animation Film	Citation: For its delightful adaptation and twist to the well-known Hare and Tortoise story using apt voices, lively dialogues and the latest 3D animation technique skilfully in an Indian setting.			
Best Short Fiction Film	Thackkayin Meedha Naangu Kangal	Tamil	Producer: Doordarshan and Ray Cinema; Director: Vasanth	₹ 10,000/- Each
Best Short Fiction Film	Citation: For its moving and realistic depiction of pride, deprivation and emotion in a small coastal village of Tamil Nadu.			
Best Cinematography	Parsiwada, Tarapore Present Day	English and Gujarati	Cameraman: Paramvir Singh; Laboratory Processing: Adlabs	₹ 10,000/- Each
Best Cinematography	Citation: For its visually poetic depiction of the decadent Parsi community, with imaginative use of great lighting and compositions.			
Best Audiography	Closer		Anmol Bhave	₹ 10,000/-
Best Audiography	Citation: For its outstandingly imaginative use of sound design complementing an equally breath-taking visual wizardry. Closer leaves its audience with a sense of beauty and awe.			
Best Editing	Naina Jogin	Hindi and Maithili	Vibuti Nathjha	₹ 10,000/-
Best Editing	Citation: For its skilful editing. It is difficult to make out where one sequence ends and the other begins!			
Best Narration / Voice Over	Wapsi	English, Hindi, Urdu, Punjabi and Kashmiri	Ajay Raina	₹ 10,000/-
Best Narration / Voice Over	Citation: Spoken in the first person, the Director literally brings his personal voice into its making.			
Special Jury Award	Final Solution	Hindi, Gujarati and English	Rakesh Sharma (Director)	₹ 10,000/-
Special Jury Award	Citation: For its powerful, hard-hitting documentation with a brutally honest approach lending incisive insights into the Godhra incident, its aftermath and the abetment of large-scale violence.			
Special Mention	Chabiwali Pocket Watch	Hindi	Vibhu Puri (Director)	Certificate Only
Special Mention	Citation: For a director's film with competent execution of a good concept with great art direction, cinematography and performances.			Certificate Only
Special Mention	Bhraimoman Theatre	Assamese	Bidyut Kotoky (Director)	Certificate Only
Special Mention	Citation: For its fascinating picture of a cultural sub-world of Assam, capturing true moments of emotion and joy.			Certificate Only

=== Best Writing on Cinema ===
The awards aim at encouraging study and appreciation of cinema as an art form and dissemination of information and critical appreciation of this art-form through publication of books, articles, reviews etc.

==== Juries ====
A committee headed by Khalid Mohamed was appointed to evaluate the writing on Indian cinema. Following were the jury members:

- Jury Members
  - Khalid Mohamed (Chairperson) • Ratnottama Sengupta • Amitabh Parashar

==== Golden Lotus Award ====
Official Name: Swarna Kamal

All the awardees are awarded with 'Golden Lotus Award (Swarna Kamal)' and cash prize.

Name of Award	Name of Book	Language	Awardee(s)	Cash prize
Best Book on Cinema	Kundan	Hindi	Publisher: Saransh Prakashan; Author: Sharad Dutt	₹ 15,000/- Each
Best Book on Cinema	Citation: For its warm and insightful reconstruction of the life and art of the legendary singer-actor K. L. Saigal, as well as its significance as reference material which will be accessible to students and cineastes of Indian cinema history.			
Best Film Critic			Baradwaj Rangan	₹ 15,000/-
Best Film Critic	Citation: For intelligent and reader-friendly reviews of popular cinema with a depth of understanding of the form, a discernible passion for the medium bulwarked consistently by a knowledge of the trends and touchstones of global cinema.			

=== Awards not given ===
Following were the awards not given as no film was found to be suitable for the award:

- Best Film on Family Welfare
- Best Non-Feature Film on Family Welfare
- Best Non-Feature Film Music Direction
- Best Educational / Motivational / Instructional Film
- Best Feature Film in Manipuri
- Best Promotional Film
- Best Exploration / Adventure Film

== Controversies ==
The awards were surrounded by couple of controversies related to it. This delayed the final announcement of the awards. The year was considered as a 'zero year' for the Film Awards.

=== Bombay and Delhi High Court Judgements ===
As per the rule, award committee judges the films which have obtained the censorship certificate from Central Board of Film Certification in order to be eligible for entry. Noted film-makers Anand Patwardhan, Gaurav Jani and Simantini Dhuru had filed a petition in the Bombay High Court asking for exemptions for their films from obtaining censor board certification. Based on this petition, the court had given judgments to consider the uncensored films as well for the awards. In spite of this judgment, juries went ahead with the existing rule and left out uncensored non-feature films.

On this judgment, Ministry of Information and Broadcasting decided to appeal in the Supreme Court of India against this verdict.

Justice B.D. Ahmed of Supreme Court then given a verdict putting aside the earlier verdict given by Bombay High Court and made compulsory for the films to have the censor board certificate.

=== Favoritism for the films ===
Kolkata based film critic and one of the jurors for 53rd National Film Awards, Shyamali Deb Banerjee, had filed a petition in the Delhi High Court against the favouritism in the selection of films for the awards in the five categories and levelling charges of corruption and fixing in deciding the 53rd Awards. She alleged that there is pressure on the members of the jury by the Directorate of the Film Festivals to decide in favour of particular films. According to her, awards have been 'High Jacked' and nexus between producers, distributors and directors.

To support her claim, she sent two letters to Directorate of the Film Festivals on 13 August and 4 September 2006, in which she questioned the selection process of the awards and also alleged that preliminary round drop-out films were then selected for the awards.

She had challenged the decision to give the awards to Black for Best Film in Hindi and Best Actor, Parineeta for Best Debut Director, saying it is not an original work and is inspired with the movies released earlier on the same theme. Parzania winning the Best Director for Rahul Dholakia and Sarika for Best Actress was accused to mock the Indian democratic system. However, Hindi Film Apaharan and Tamil film Anniyan which won Best Screenplay and Best Special Effects respectively were accused of not even qualifying the preliminary rounds and then winning the awards.

However, the petition was dismissed by the court saying the petitioner had no case when the other members of the Jury had no objection to the selection of the films for the awards.

=== Awards for Black ===
Sanjay Leela Bhansali's Black also faced the heat of controversy when Shyamali Deb Banerjee, a juror for the 53rd National Film Awards, claimed that the film was ineligible for awards as it was an adaptation of the film The Miracle Worker and according to the rules adaptations were ineligible for awards. She had also filed a petition in the court. Though the film finally won three national awards, for Best Actor, Best Costume Design and Best Feature Film in Hindi. There was also a big discussion about the fact that Mohanlal was not awarded for his role in Thanmathra, which was played in Malayalam.

=== Awards for Parzania ===
Shyamali Deb Banerjee had also alleged Rahul Dholakia's Parzania in her filed petition. It said that "film mocks the Indian democratic system and ends with just forming a human rights commission for a probe into the riots. This film has been banned in Gujarat and if the award for best director goes to this film, it might fan further controversy." Film won Rahul Dholakia, his first National Film Award for Best Direction and Sarika won Best Actress Award.
