= 53rd Filmfare Awards =

2008 awards for Hindi cinema

- Date: 16 February 2008
- Site: Yash Raj Studios
- Hosted by: Shahrukh Khan; Saif Ali Khan; Vidya Balan; Karan Johar
- Official website: www.filmfare.com

Highlights
- Best Film: Taare Zameen Par
- Best Critic: Chak De! India
- Most awards: Chak De! India, Guru & Taare Zameen Par (5)
- Most nominations: Guru (14)

Television coverage
- Network: Sony Entertainment Television (India)

The 53rd Filmfare Awards, organized by Filmfare, honored the best Bollywood films of 2007. It took place on 16 February 2008 at the Yash Raj Studios, Mumbai.

Guru led the ceremony with 14 nominations, followed by Chak De! India with 13 nominations, Om Shanti Om with 12 nominations and Taare Zameen Par with 11 nominations.

Chak De! India, Guru and Taare Zameen Par won 5 awards each, thus becoming the most-awarded films at the ceremony, with the first winning Best Film (Critics) and Best Actor (for Shah Rukh Khan), the second winning Best Music Director (for A. R. Rahman), and the latter winning Best Film, Best Director (for Aamir Khan) and Best Actor (Critics) (for Darsheel Safary).

Shah Rukh Khan received dual nominations for Best Actor for his performances in Chak De! India and Om Shanti Om, winning his seventh award in the category.

Kareena Kapoor won her first and only Best Actress award for her performance in Jab We Met.

Konkona Sen Sharma received dual nominations for Best Supporting Actress for her performances in Laaga Chunari Mein Daag and Life in a... Metro, winning for the latter.

The event was also notable as Madhuri Dixit received her 13th nomination for Best Actress for her role in Aaja Nachle, breaking the record held by Meena Kumari (with 12 nominations) for 35 years.

== Awards and nominees ==
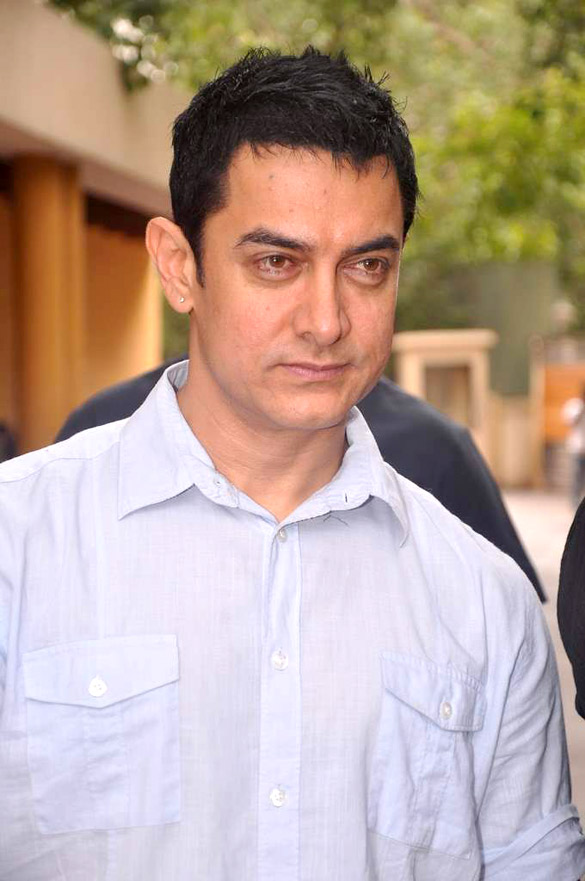
Aamir Khan, Best Director winner

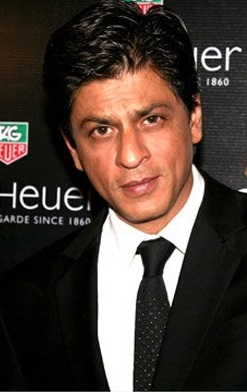
Shah Rukh Khan, Best Actor winner

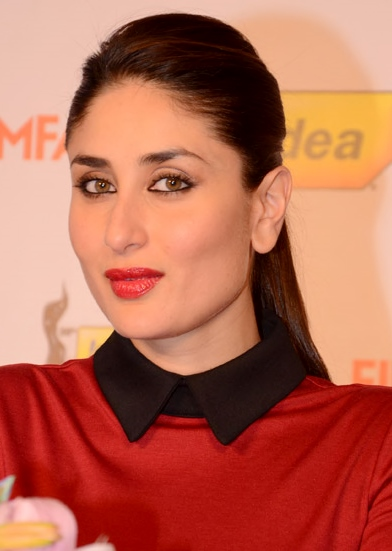
Kareena Kapoor, Best Actress winner

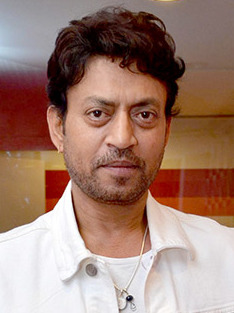
Irrfan Khan, Best Supporting Actor winner

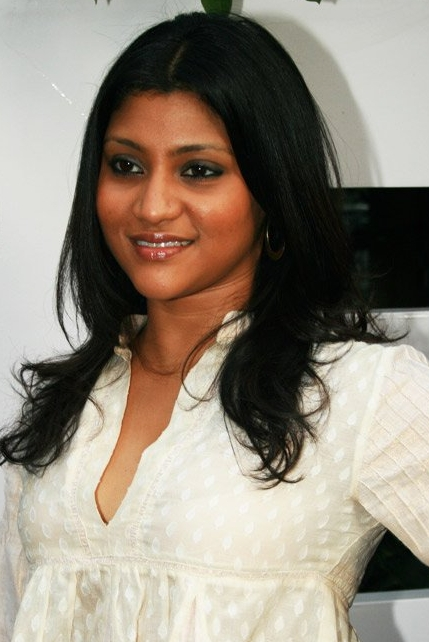
Konkona Sen Sharma, Best Supporting Actor winner

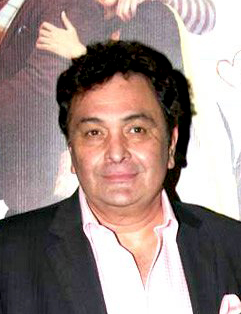
Rishi Kapoor, Lifetime Achievement Awardee

The winners are listed first, highlighted in boldface.

=== Main awards ===
Best Film	Best Director
**Taare Zameen Par** **— Aamir Khan Productions**; Chak De! India — Yash Raj Films; Guru — Madras Talkies; Jab We Met — Shree Ashtavinayak Cine Vision Ltd; Om Shanti Om — Red Chillies Entertainment	**Aamir Khan** – **Taare Zameen Par**; Anurag Basu – Life in a... Metro; Farah Khan – Om Shanti Om; Imtiaz Ali – Jab We Met; Mani Ratnam – Guru; Shimit Amin – Chak De! India
Best Actor	Best Actress
**Shah Rukh Khan – Chak De! India as Coach Kabir Khan**; Abhishek Bachchan – Guru as Gurukant "Guru" Desai; Akshay Kumar – Namastey London as Arjun Singh; Darsheel Safary – Taare Zameen Par as Ishaan Awasthi; Shahid Kapoor – Jab We Met as Aditya Kashyap; Shah Rukh Khan – Om Shanti Om as Om Prakash Makhija / Om Kapoor	**Kareena Kapoor – Jab We Met as Geet Dhillon**; Aishwarya Rai – Guru as Sujata Gurukant Desai; Deepika Padukone – Om Shanti Om as Shantipriya Mehra / Sandhya "Sandy" Bansal; Madhuri Dixit – Aaja Nachle as Dia Shrivastav; Rani Mukerji – Laaga Chunari Mein Daag as Vibhavari Sahay / Badki; Vidya Balan – Bhool Bhulaiyaa as Avni S. Chaturvedi / Manjulika
Best Supporting Actor	Best Supporting Actress
**Irrfan Khan – Life In A... Metro as Monty**; Aamir Khan – Taare Zameen Par as Ram Shankar Nikumbh; Anil Kapoor – Welcome as Sagar "Majnu" Pandey; Mithun Chakraborty – Guru as Manik "Nanaji" Dasgupta; Shreyas Talpade – Om Shanti Om as Pappu Master	**Konkona Sen Sharma – Life in a... Metro as Shruti**; Konkona Sen Sharma – Laaga Chunari Mein Daag as Shubhavari Sahay / Chutki; Rani Mukerji – Saawariya as Gulabji; Shilpa Shukla – Chak De! India as Bindiya Naik; Tisca Chopra – Taare Zameen Par as Maya Awasthi
Best Male Debut	Best Female Debut
**Ranbir Kapoor** – **Saawariya as Ranbir Raj**; Darsheel Safary – Taare Zameen Par as Ishaan Awasthi; Himesh Reshammiya – Aap Ka Surroor as HR; Muzzamil Ibrahim – Dhokha as Inspector Zaid Ahmed Khan; Neil Nitin Mukesh – Johnny Gaddaar as Johnny Gaddaar; Ruslaan Mumtaz – MP3: Mera Pehla Pehla Pyaar as Rohan	**Deepika Padukone** – **Om Shanti Om as Shantipriya Mehra / Sandhya Bansal**; Hansika Motwani – Aap Kaa Surroor as Riya Bakshi; Jiah Khan – Nishabd as Jia; Sonam Kapoor – Saawariya as Sakina Ibrahim; Urvashi Sharma – Naqaab as Sophia D'Costa Malhotra
Best Music Director	Best Lyricist
**A. R. Rahman – Guru**; Monty Sharma – Saawariya; Pritam – Jab We Met; Pritam – Life in a... Metro; Vishal–Shekhar – Om Shanti Om	**Prasoon Joshi – "Maa"** from **Taare Zameen Par**; Gulzar – "Tere Bina" from Guru; Javed Akhtar – "Main Agar Kahoon" from Om Shanti Om; Sameer – "Jab Se Tere Naina" from Saawariya; Vishal Dadlani – "Aankhon Mein Teri" from Om Shanti Om
Best Playback Singer – Male	Best Playback Singer – Female
**Shaan – "Jab Se Tere Naina"** from **Saawariya**; A. R. Rahman – "Tere Bina" from Guru; K.K. – "Aankhon Mein Teri" from Om Shanti Om; Sonu Nigam – "Main Agar Kahoon" from Om Shanti Om; Sukhwinder Singh – "Chak De! India" from Chak De! India	**Shreya Ghoshal – "Barso Re"** from **Guru**; Alisha Chinai – "It's Rocking!" from Kya Love Story Hai; Shreya Ghoshal – "Yeh Ishq Hai" from Jab We Met; Sunidhi Chauhan – "Aaja Nachle" from Aaja Nachle; Sunidhi Chauhan – "Sajanaji Vari Vari" from Honeymoon Travels Pvt. Ltd.

=== Critics' awards ===
Best Film
**Chak De! India** (Shimit Amin)
Best Performance
Male	Female
**Darsheel Safary – Taare Zameen Par**	**Tabu – Cheeni Kum**

=== Technical awards ===
Best Story	Best Screenplay
**Amole Gupte** – **Taare Zameen Par**; Jaideep Sahni – Chak De! India; Mani Ratnam – Guru; David N. Donihue and Rahul Dholakia – Parzania; Vibha Singh – Dharm	**Anurag Basu** – **Life In A... Metro**; Amole Gupte – Taare Zameen Par; Jaideep Sahni – Chak De! India; David N. Donihue and Rahul Dholakia – Parzania; Sriram Raghavan – Johnny Gaddaar
Best Dialogue	Best Editing
**Imtiaz Ali** – **Jab We Met**; Amole Gupte–Taare Zameen Par; Jaideep Sahni – Chak De! India; Mayur Puri – Om Shanti Om; Sanjeev Dutta – Life in a... Metro	**Amitabh Shukla** – **Chak De! India**
Best Choreography	Best Cinematography
**Saroj Khan** – **"Barso Re"** – **Guru**	**Sudeep Chatterjee** – **Chak De! India**
Best Production Design	Best Sound Design
**Samir Chanda** – **Guru**	**Leslie Fernandes** – **Johnny Gaddaar**
Best Costume Design	Best Background Score
**Sujata Sharma – Gandhi, My Father**	**A. R. Rahman** – **Guru**
Best Special Effects	Best Action
**Red Chillies VFX** – **Om Shanti Om**	**Rob Miller** – **Chak De! India**

=== Special awards ===
Lifetime Achievement
- **Rishi Kapoor**
R. D. Burman Award.
- **Monty Sharma**
Fresh Face of the Year
- **Deepika Padukone**

== Maximum nominations and wins ==
The following films received multiple nominations.

- 10 nominations: Guru, Chak De! India and Om Shanti Om
- 9 nominations: Taare Zameen Par
- 8 nominations: Saawariya
- 7 nominations: Jab We Met
- 6 nominations: Life in a... Metro
- 2 nominations: Parzania and Aaja Nachle

The following films received multiple awards.

- 5 awards: Chak De India, Guru and Taare Zameen Par
- 3 awards: Life in a... Metro and Saawariya
- 2 awards: Jab We Met and Om Shanti Om

== See also ==
- Filmfare Awards
- 52nd Filmfare Awards
- 54th Filmfare Awards
- 55th Filmfare Awards
