= Parzania =

- Directed by: Rahul Dholakia
- Written by: David N. Donihue; Rahul Dholakia
- Produced by: Rahul Dholakia; Kamal Patel
- Starring: Naseeruddin Shah; Sarika; Corin Nemec; Raj Zutshi; Parzan Dastur
- Cinematography: Robert D. Eras
- Edited by: Aarif Sheikh
- Music by: Zakir Hussain; Taufiq Qureshi
- Distributed by: PVR Pictures
- Release dates: 26 November 2005 (bUSAN); 26 January 2007 (India)
- Running time: 122 minutes
- Country: India
- Language: English
- Budget: US$700,000

Parzania (translation: Heaven and hell on earth) is a 2007 English-language Indian drama film co-written and directed by Rahul Dholakia; David N. Donihue is the other co-writer. The film featured Naseeruddin Shah and Sarika in the lead roles, while Corin Nemec and Raj Zutshi played supporting roles. Made on a budget of US$700,000, the film was shot in Ahmedabad and Hyderabad.

The film is inspired by the true story of Rupa Mody, a Parsi woman whose ten-year-old son, Azhar Mody (represented in the film as the character Parzaan Pithawala) disappeared after the 28 February 2002 Gulbarg Society massacre during which 69 people were killed and which was one of the violent episodes of the communal riots in Gujarat. The film traces the journey of the Pithawala family while trying to locate their missing son.

The film was premiered at 36th India International Film Festival in Goa on 26 November 2005, before being released nationwide on 26 January 2007.

== Plot ==
Allan, an American, arrives in Ahmedabad searching for answers, to find internal peace and to understand the world and his troubled life. He chooses India as his school and Gandhi as the subject of his thesis. It is here that he meets the Pithawala family — Cyrus, his wife Shernaz, son Parzan and daughter Dilshad. The Pithawalas being Parsis follow Zoroastrianism. Through them and the teachings of a Gandhian, Allan starts to find peace of mind.

The plot is based on the story of Rupa Mody, whose son went missing after the 2002 Gujarat riots. The ten-year-old Parzan disappears during these riots when their surrounding homes are attacked. Cyrus, Shernaz and Dilshad manage to escape the carnage. In the aftermath of the riots, Cyrus searches for his missing child while fighting for his own sanity. While assisting the Pithawalas in their search, Allan battles to uncover the reason behind the riots in an effort to make some sense of the incident. People start to question government's official explanation of the incident which downplays any conspiracy. As a result, a Human Rights Commission is formed. Through the commission, several witnesses and victims testify against the indifference of the police to protect them from the rioters. The film ends with a dedication to the victims of communal violence.

== Cast ==
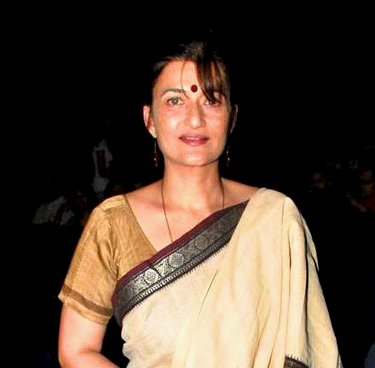
Sarika won the National Film Award for Best Actress in 2005 for her performance as Shernaz in this film.

- Naseeruddin Shah as Cyrus
- Corin Nemec as Allan
- Sarika as Shernaz
- Parzan Dastur as Parzan
- Pearl Barsiwalla
- Raj Zutshi
- Asif Basra
- Pushpendra Saini
- Ram Gopal Bajaj

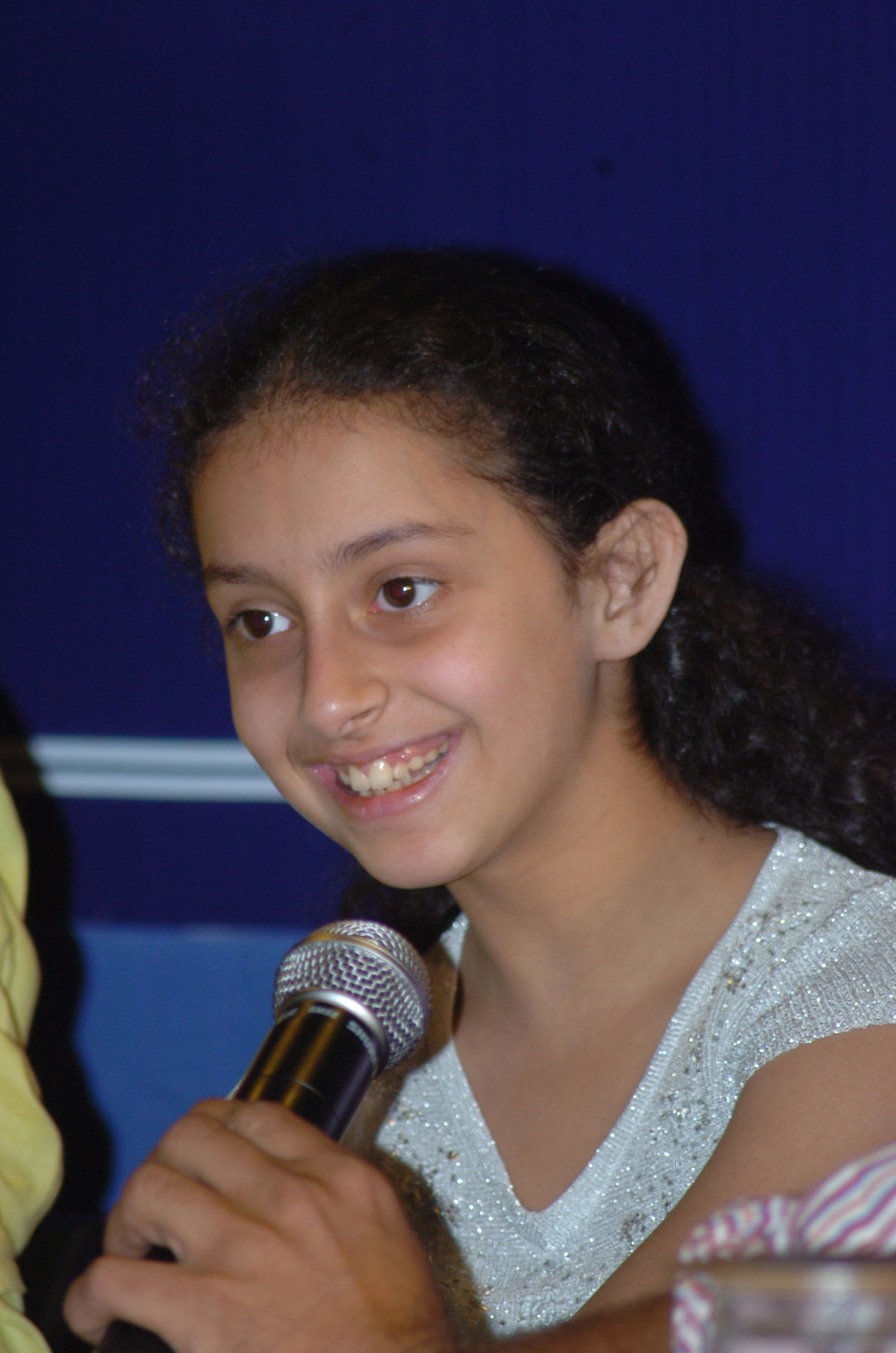
Pearl Barsiwalla addressing press conference, IFFI (2005)

== Production ==
In the 2002 communal riots in Gujarat, Los Angeles-based director Rahul Dholakia faced a personal tragedy. The riots left his friend's family shattered and this left an indelible mark on him. It hurt him all the more because the incidents happened in his home state. He felt responsible, both morally and socially, and wanted to speak up as a filmmaker. Most of the US$700,000 budget came from two of his Indian friends in the United States. Dholakia chose to make the film in English because he thought that communal riots was a global issue. Furthermore, he was unsure whether he could have the film released in India, given the sensitive nature of the film.

While deciding on the cast, Dholakia said that they were not looking at people's physical appearances. He added:

We didn't want glamorous people to play realistic roles. We've shot the film without any makeup, etc. We needed people who looked believable. So casting did play a major role, and I'm not even talking about the principal cast. Every actor in the film has been auditioned, and that includes people with one line to say or not even that.

Naseeruddin Shah was the first and obvious choice for the film. But Dholakia was very apprehensive about whether Shah would agree to do the film, and if he could pay his remuneration. His latter worry was because the film started out as a very low-budget film. After Dholakia narrated the script to him, Shah said, "I agree in principle, provided we make this sensitively and sensibly." Shah thought that the film's story needed to be told, and he felt that he had to be part of it. After agreeing to join the cast, Shah did not actively research for his character. Being a parent himself, he felt that it was not difficult for him to empathize with the family whose son was lost in the riots. After 18 years of hiatus, Sarika chose to return to cinema with this film. Since the film dealt with a real and sensitive issue, she felt that Parzania went beyond than being just a film. Despite facing the camera after a long gap, Sarika felt quite comfortable during the shooting.

Shortly thereafter, Shah, Sarika and Dholakia went through the script in great detail. Owing to their screen and real-life experiences, Shah and Sarika suggested changes and revised the script several times.

Because the film was about communal riots in Gujarat, the film was purposefully not released there, as the cinema owners refused to screen it, fearing backlash. After an initiative by ANHAD, a civil rights group, the film was screened at some places in the state after April 2007.

== Awards and honours ==
Year	Award	Category	Recipient	Result
2007	National Film Awards	Best Director	Rahul Dholakia	Won
2007	National Film Awards	Best Actress	Sarika	Won
2008	Filmfare Awards	Best Story	David N. Donihue, Rahul Dholakia	Nominated
2008	Filmfare Awards	Best Screenplay	David N. Donihue, Rahul Dholakia	Nominated
2008	Screen Awards	Ramnath Goenka Memorial Award	Rahul Dholakia	Won
