= Devi Prasad Bagrodia =

Indian writer, social worker and tea planter

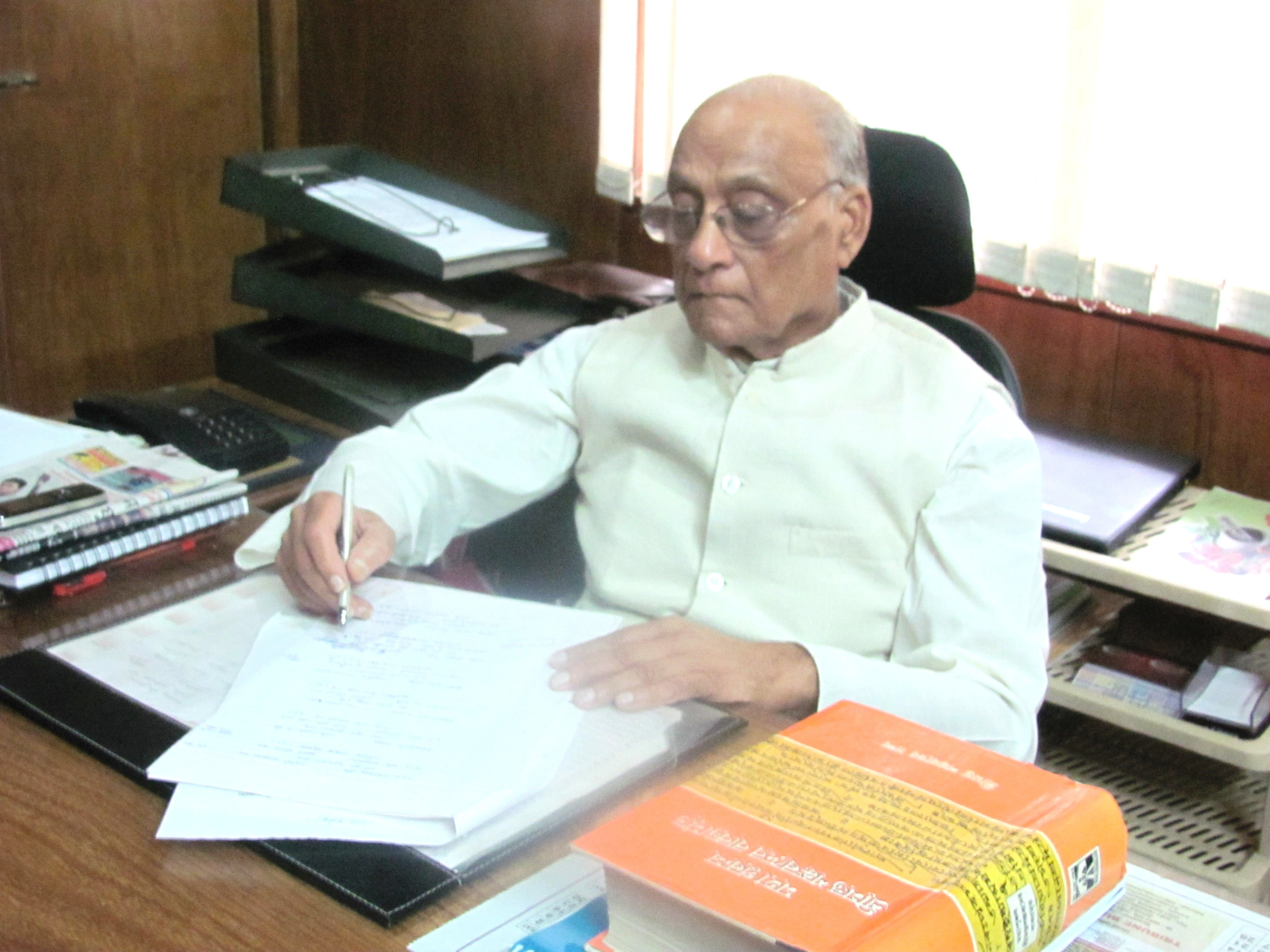
- Born: 8 November 1939 (age 86)
- Education: DHSK College, Dibrugarh
- Occupations: Writer, Tea Planter
- Writing career
- Language: Assamese, Hindi, English

Devi Prasad Bagrodia, is a noted writer, social worker and tea planter based in Dibrugarh in Assam, India.

== Biography ==
=== Early life ===
Devi Prasad Bagrodia was born to Shew Bhagovan Bagrodia of the Bhekulajuan village of Tengakhat in the Dibrugarh district in Assam on 8 November 1939. He was groomed in a total Assamese rural set-up in his village.

=== Education ===
Devi Prasad Bagrodia finished matriculation from Tengakhat HE School in Assamese medium. He studied ISc and then studied up to BA at DHS Kanoi College at Dibrugarh.

== Published works ==
Devi Prasad Bagrodia is the author of several books; mostly translations of famous works of Assamese authors. He translated the complete work of Jyoti Prasad Agarwala into Hindi in the form of two books – Jyoti Sudha in 1991 and Jyoti Prabha in 1995. The latter was released by Dr Shankar Dayal Sharma, the Vice President of India. These works showcasing the Assamese literature and culture were well received by national-level scholars. He has also completed translations of Borgeets composed by Mahapurush Sankardev and Madhavdev, along with having translated Gunamala, a transcreation of Bhagavata Purana in Assamese language by Mahapurush Sankardev into Hindi. Bagrodia's literary work include the Hindi translation of Dr Nagen Saikia's Mit-Bhash, Chah Gasar Kalam, Sukhor Prithivi, Mirabai, and Agastha Yatra.

He also published a book titled Tha Agarwala Family of Tezpur written by Bibekananda Agarwala. His other publications include You and Me on a Journey to Light by Candraprasāda Śaikīẏā Ananda Bormudoi.

== Awards ==
Bagrodia is a recipient of the Central Hindi Directorate's award of "translator of remarkable standard" in 1999 under the Union Ministry of Human Resource Development (India), "Fulchand Khandelwar Samhati Award" in 2002 and "Meera Samman" by the Meera Smruti Sansthan of Chittorgarh, Rajasthan in 2011, and a few others.

== Gallery ==
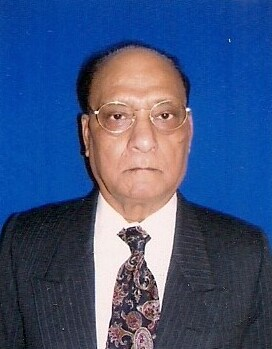
Devi Prasad Bagrodia

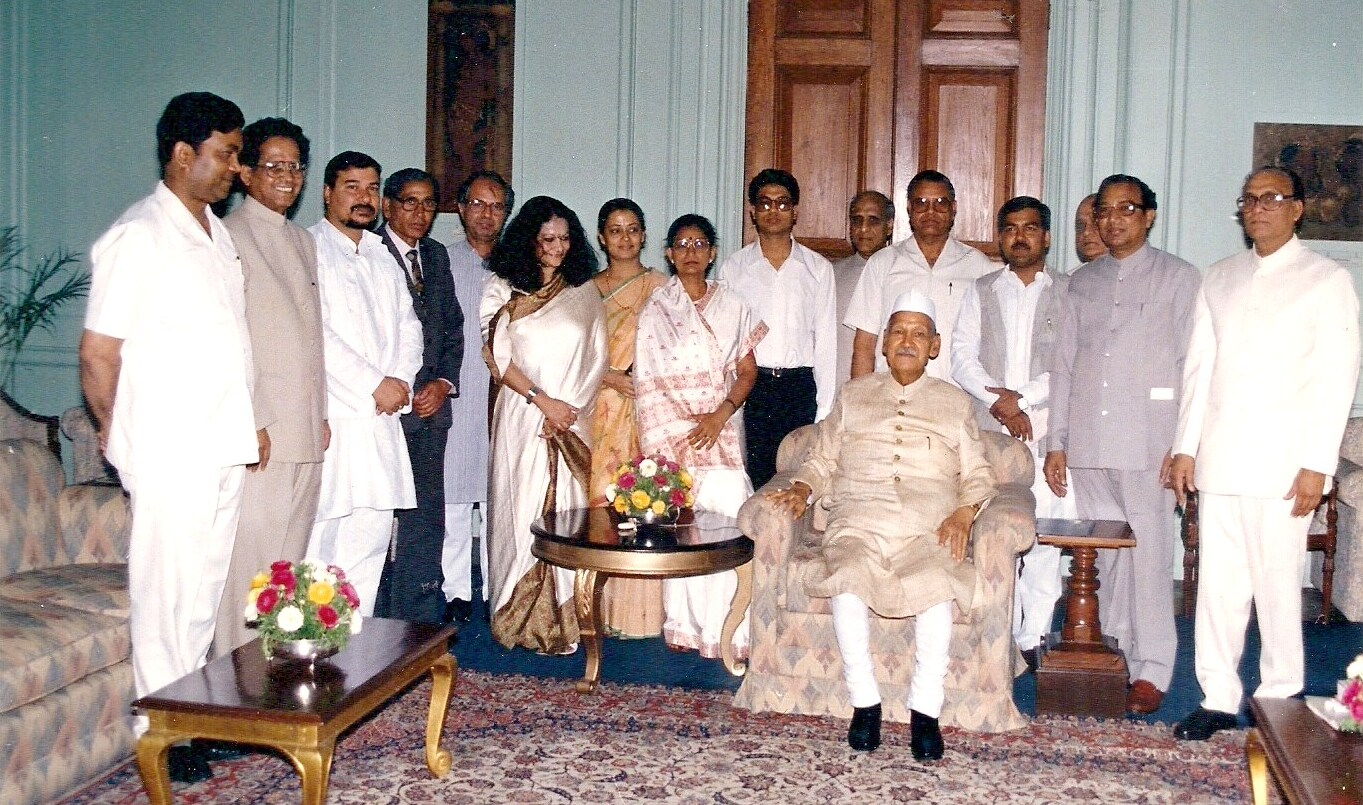
Devi Prasad Bagrodia (1st from Right) and dignitaries during release of his book 'Jyoti Prabha'

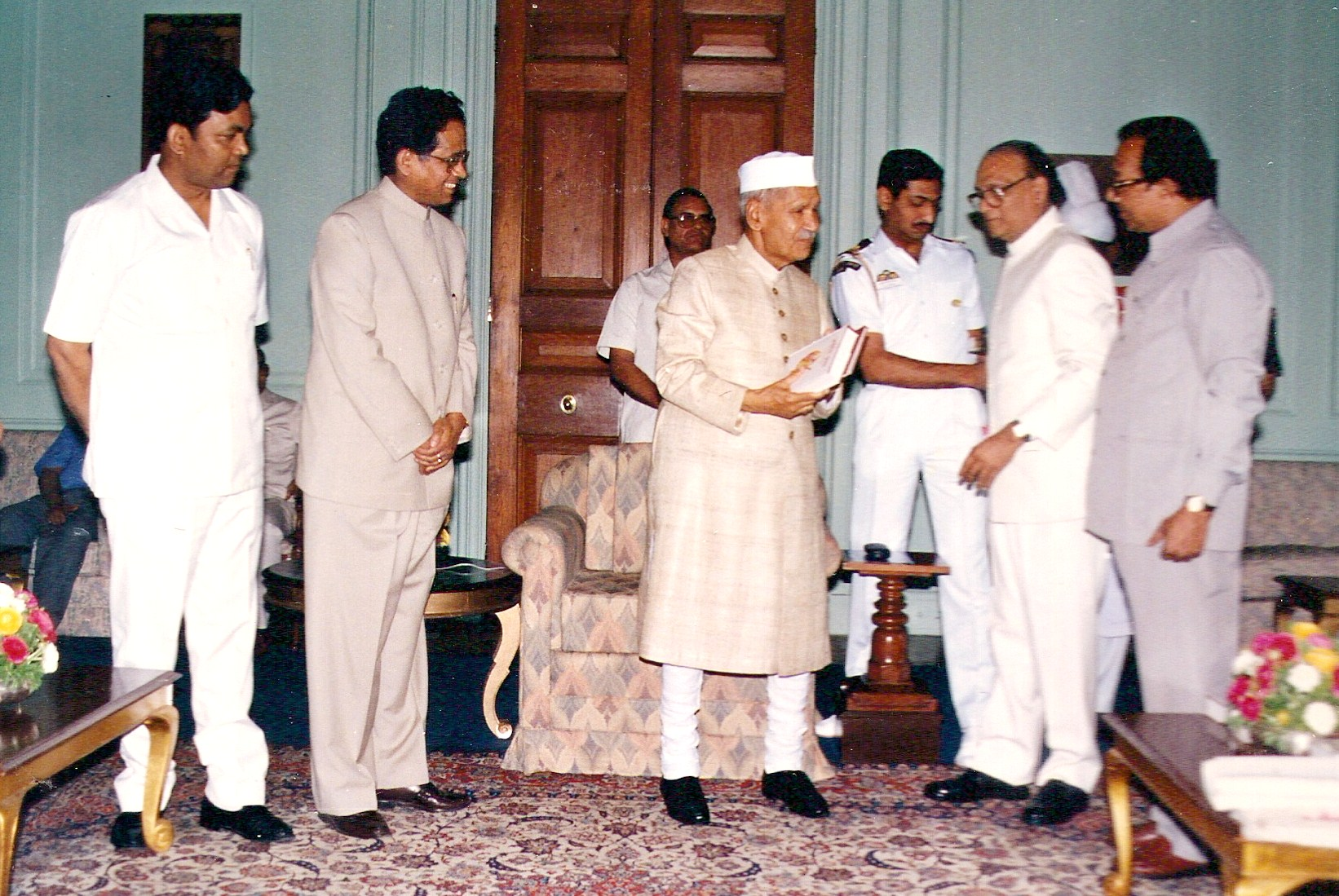
Devi Prasad Bagrodia (2nd from Right) with former President of India Dr. Shankar Dayal Sharma during release of his book 'Jyoti Prabha'

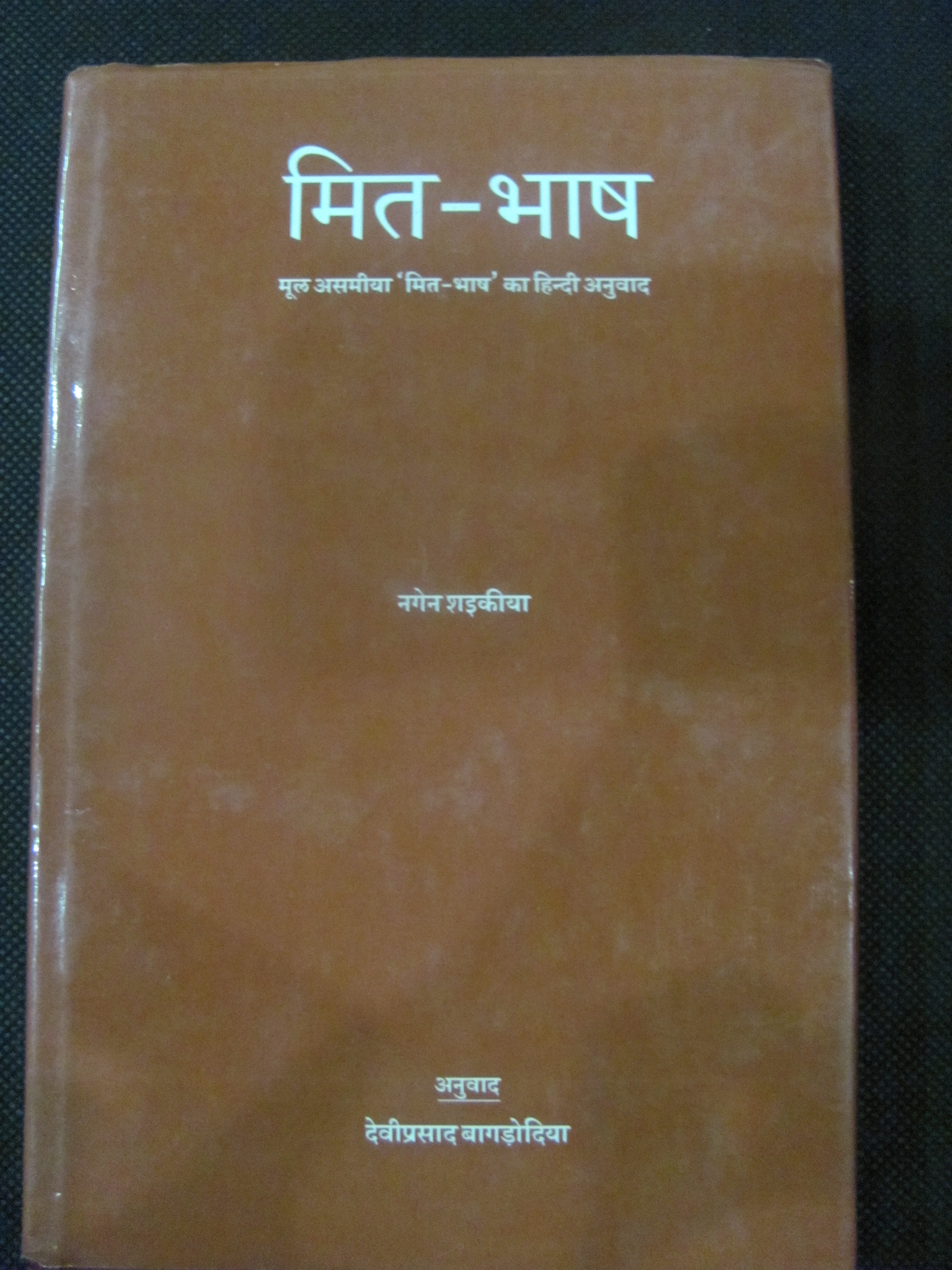
Mita Bhash

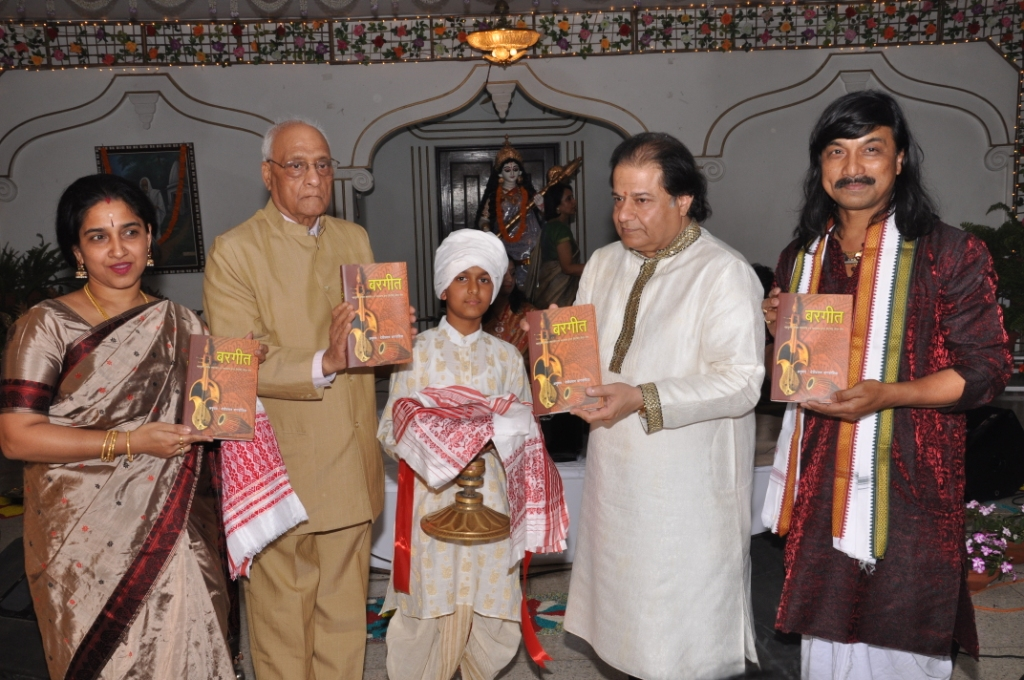
Anup Jalota releasing Devi Prasad Bagrodia's Hindi translation of Borgeets
