= Sarika =

Indian actress and costume designer

Sarika Thakur
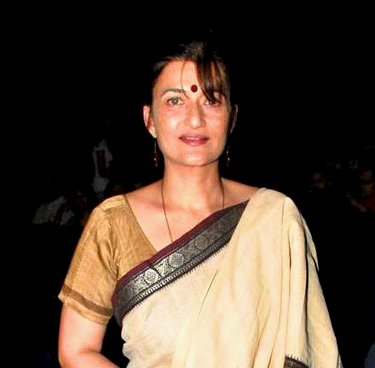
- Thakur in 2010
- Born: Sarika Thakur; 5 December 1960 (age 65); New Delhi, India
- Occupations: Actress; Costume designer
- Years active: 1967—present
- Spouse: Kamal Haasan (m. 1988; div. 2004)
- Children: Shruti Haasan; Akshara Haasan

Sarika Thakur (born 5 December 1960), known mononymously as Sarika, is an Indian actress and costume designer. In 2005, she won the National Film Award for Best Actress for the English-language film Parzania. She was also awarded the National Film Award for Best Costume Design for her work in Hey Ram (2001).

== Early life ==
Sarika was born on 5 December 1960 in New Delhi into a family of Marathi and Rajput descent. Her father abandoned the family when she was very young. From then on, she became the breadwinner of the family. She did not attend school.

== Career ==
Sarika started her film career as a child actor at the age of 5, playing the role of a boy, Master Sooraj, during the 1960s in Hindi language films. Her most notable and popular appearance as a child artist was in the year 1967 in the musical superhit Hamraaz, where she was seen as the daughter of Vimi named baby Sarika. She appeared in many children's movies. Later, she moved on to films with Rajshri Productions Geet Gaata Chal with Sachin, with whom she starred in many Hindi and Marathi films.

After separating from her husband, she made a comeback in Hindi films. She played Ipsita Ray Chakraverti in the film Sacred Evil – A True Story which failed at the box office. In year 2000, Sarika won the National Film Award for Best Costume Design for the film Hey Ram.

Her performance in Parzania in which she plays the role of a Zoroastrian woman who loses her child during the 2002 riots of India,

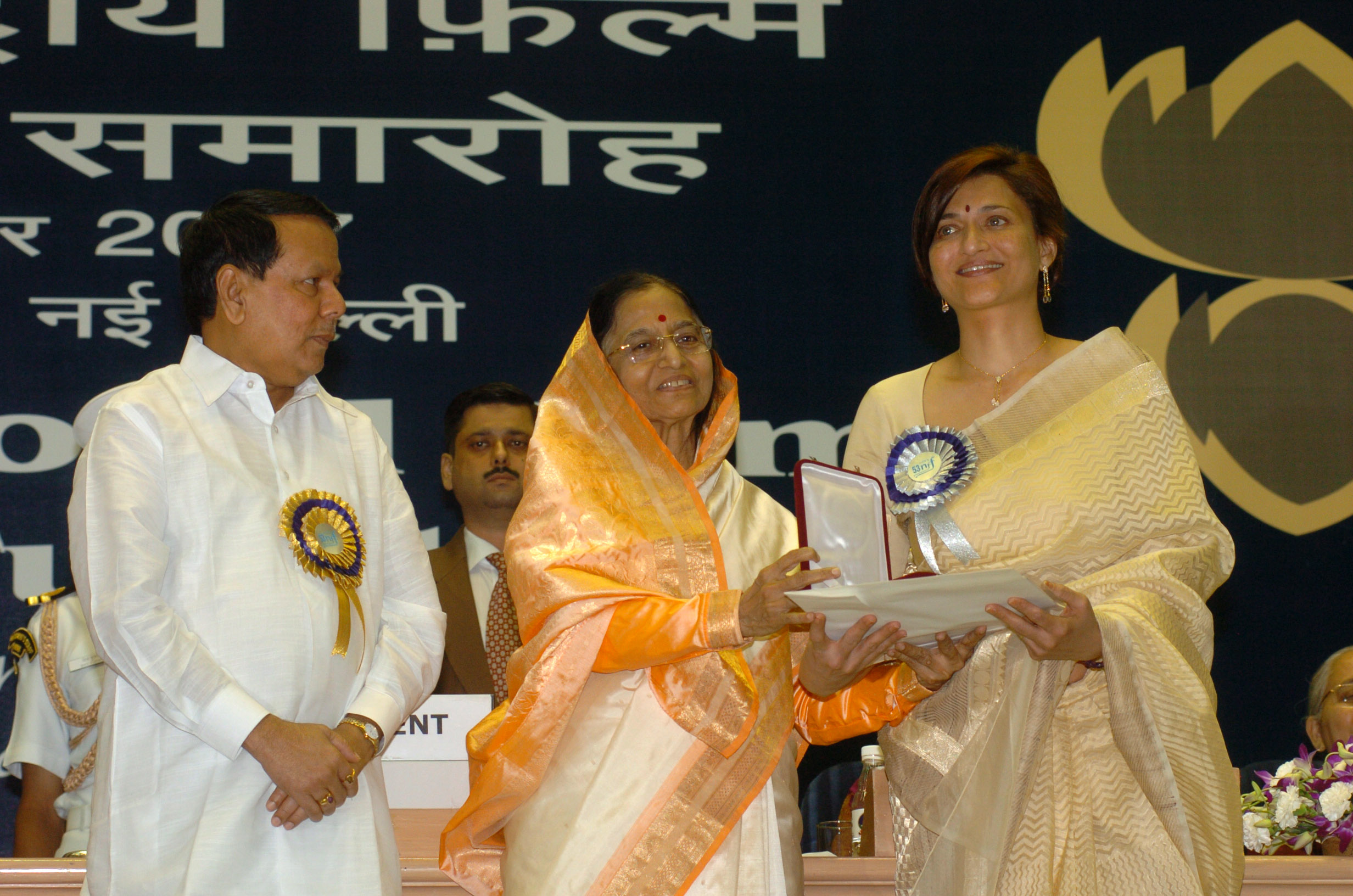
Pratibha Devi Singh Patil presenting the Best Film Actress Award for the year 2005 to Ms. Sarika for her role in English Language Film “Parzania”, at the 53rd National Film Awards function, in New Delhi on September 14, 2007

earned her the National Film Award for Best Actress. Khalid Mohamed wrote for Hindustan Times of her performance, "Sarika is marvelously restrained and lifelike, making you care for Parzania straight from the heart."

Sarika has starred as Sheetal Thadani in the movie Bheja Fry (2006), where she played the wife of Rajat Kapoor. She also had a small but important role in Manorama Six Feet Under. Her latest movie is Shoebite, which has been delayed for production, where she stars opposite Amitabh Bachchan.

Sarika made her television debut in Sony TV's Yudh which stars Amitabh Bachchan in the lead role. Apart from acting, she also served as the costume designer, sound designer and associate director for Kuruthipunal (1995) under Raaj Kamal Films International.

== Personal life ==
Sarika and actor Kamal Haasan began living together in 1985, marrying after the birth of their first child, Shruti (born 1986). Shruti is a singer and a Kollywood-Tollywood actress. Their younger daughter, Akshara (born 1991) is an assistant director and actress. Sarika stopped acting soon after their marriage, she worked as Haasan's costume designer for the movie Hey Ram and won the National Film Award for Best Costume Designer. In 2002, the couple filed for divorce, which was granted in 2004.

== Filmography ==
Year	Film	Role
2022	Uunchai	Mala Trivedi
2017	Mr. Kabaadi	Chando
2016	Baar Baar Dekho	Varsha Varma, Jai's mother
2014	Purani Jeans	Sherry Lawrence
2013	David	
2013	Club 60	Dr. Saira Shaikh
2012	Jab Tak Hai Jaan	Dr. Zoya Ali Khan
2012	Shoebite (Unreleased)	Aditi
2010	Society	
2009	Kaccha Limboo	
2008	Hari Puttar: A Comedy of Terrors	Hari Puttar's Mother
2008	Yeh Mera India	Sushma Talreja
2008	Tahaan	(uncredited) Tahaan's Mother
2007	Manorama Six Feet Under	Manorama
2007	Bheja Fry	Sheetal R. Thadani
2006	Baabul	Pushpa Kapoor
2006	Sacred Evil	Ipsita
2005	Kal: Yesterday and Tomorrow	Ira Haksar
2005	Parzania	Shehnaz
2004	American Daylight	Dolly
2003	Raghu Romeo	Party guest
2003	Punnagai Poove (Tamil)	
1997	Aakhri Sanghursh	Seeta
1989	Santosh	Munni/Sarika
1989	Ajeeb Itefaq	Aparna
1988	Kharidar	
1986	Qatl	Rohini
1986	Swati	Dancer/Singer
1986	Shart	Ruhi
1986	Dilwaala	Sapna
1986	Mangal Dada	
1986	Zinda Laash	
1985	Ek Daku Saher Mein	Ranjana
1985	Ram Tere Kitne Nam	(uncredited) Lily (scene from Devta)
1985	Ek Bhool	(TV)
1984	Karishmaa	Neeta
1984	Gangvaa	Chameli
1984	Ram Tera Desh	Lily D'Souza
1984	Aasmaan	
1984	Akalmand	Advocate Shobha
1984	Raaj Tilak	Gypsy
1983	Bade Dil Wala	Juhi Sinha/Juhi V. Gupta
1983	Nastik	(as Baby Sarika) Mala
1983	Kalka	Gauri
1983	Bagga Daku	
1983	Razia Sultan	
1982	Vidhaata	Neelima
1982	Badle Ki Aag	Asha
1982	Meharbaani	
1982	Teesri Aankh	Rekha
1982	Yeh Vaada Raha	Rita Saxena
1982	Shriman Shrimati	Aruna Gupta
1982	Satte Pe Satta	Sheela
1982	Daulat	Sushma
1982	Dil Hi Dil Mein	Gulabo/Rani
1981	Khara Khota	With actor Raj Kiran
1981	Tik...Tik...Tik (Tamil)	Miss India Sherley
1981	Sannata	Sapna
1981	Dahshat	Kiran
1981	Paanch Qaidi	
1981	Kranti	Sheetal
1981	Nai Imarat	Ratna
1981	Plot No. 5	
1981	Sharada	Anita Kohli
1980	Jyoti Bane Jwala	Asha
1980	Nazrana Pyar Ka	Anuradha
1980	Pyaara Dushman	
1980	Yeh Kaisa Insaaf?	Sudha
1979	Bin Phere Hum Tere	Shikha
1979	Griha Pravesh	Sapna
1979	Jaan-E-Bahaar	Kuku Rai
1979	Jaani Dushman	Bindiya
1979	Raakhi Ki Saugandh	Paro/Tina
1979	Til Til Dalekha	
1978	Dil Aur Deewaar	Laxmi Rai
1978	tail chitr	
1978	Geeta "Anpadh"	
1978	Devata	Lily
1978	Madhu Malti	
1977	Paradh	Marathi Film (Nutan Sachin Pilgaonkar Shreeram Lagoo)
1976	Bundal Baaz	(uncredited) TV Newscaster
1976	Raksha Bandhan	Asha
1976	Zid	
1975	Khushboo	Kali
1975	Geet Gaata Chal	Radha
1975	Kaagaz Ki Nao	
1975	Vandana	
1972	Haar Jeet	Child artist
1971	Chhoti Bahu	(uncredited) Gopi
1971	Jawan Muhabat	Child artist - Rekha Sareen
1970	Devi	(as Moppet Suraj) Deepak
1969	Beti	Little Nanda
1969	Balak	Child artist - Deepak "Deepu"
1969	Jyoti	(as Moppet Suraj) Munna/Nandan
1969	Satyakam	Child artist - Kabul S. Archarya
1969	Aashirwad	Child artist - Neena
1967	Hamraaz	Child artist - Sarika
1967	Majhli Didi	Uma – Hemangini

=== Television ===
Year	Show	Role
2014	Yudh	Gauri Sekhar
2015	Darr Sabko Lagta Hai	Miss Consica
2022	Modern Love: Mumbai	Dilbar

== Awards and nominations ==
Year	Award	Category	Work	Result	Ref.
1982	Filmfare Awards	Best Supporting Actress	Sharda	Nominated	
2000	National Film Awards	Best Costume Design	Hey Ram	Won	
2005	National Film Awards	Best Actress	Parzania	Won	
2013	BIG Star Entertainment Awards	Most Entertaining Actor in a Social Role – Female	Club 60	Won	
2023	Indian Television Academy Awards	Best Actress - Drama (OTT)	Modern Love Mumbai	Nominated	
