= Janmadata =

- Directed by: Swapan Saha
- Written by: Snehasis Chakraborty; Prosenjit Chatterjee (Story concept)
- Produced by: Jhamu Sughand; Prosenjit
- Starring: Rachna Banerjee; Ranjit Mallick; Razzak; Ranjit Mallick; Jisshu Sengupta; Tapas Paul
- Cinematography: K R Ramesh
- Edited by: Atish Dey Sarkar
- Music by: Ashok Bhadra
- Distributed by: SVF Cinemas
- Release date: 8 February 2008
- Running time: 170 minutes
- Country: India
- Language: Bengali

Janmadata (Bengali: জন্মদাতা) (2008) is a Bengali family action thriller film directed by Swapan Saha.

== Cast ==
- Ranjit Mullick as Durgacharan Singha
- Razzak as Bhavani Chowdhury
- Jisshu Sengupta as CBI Officer Raj Sinha
- Rachana Banerjee as Sima Singha
- Tapas Paul as retired constable Iqbal
- Laboni Sarkar as Durgacharan's wife
- Abhishek Chatterjee as Mohon Singha, Durgacharan's son
- Locket Chatterjee as Rina Singha
- Rajesh Sharma (actor) as Subal Da
- Shankar Chakraborty as Shibnath
- Anamika Saha as Durgacharan's mother
- Rita Koiral as Durgacharan's sister
- Anuradha Ray as Bhavani's wife
- Dolon Roy as Durgacharan's late daughter
- Unknown as Bhavani's late son
- Kanchan Mullick as Raj's friend
- Kaushik Banerjee as son-in-law of Singha house
- Dulal Lahiri
- Shyamal Dutta as Police Commissioner
