= Bhakalajan Gaon =

Bhakalajan Gaon, or Bhekulajuan, is a village in Tengaghat tehsil of Dibrugarh district of Assam state in India. Famous assemese writer Devi Prasad Bagrodia is born here on 8 November 1939.
