= Zid (1976 film) =

- Poster
- Directed by: Vijay
- Starring: Nutan; Sarika; Sachin; Premnath
- Music by: Ravindra Jain
- Release date: 1976
- Running time: 110 min.
- Country: India
- Language: Hindi

Zid is a 1976 Indian Hindi-language film directed by Vijay, starring Nutan, Sarika, Sachin and Premnath.

== Cast ==
- Nutan
- Sarika
- Sachin
- Premnath

== Music ==
All songs were written by Ravindra Jain.

1. "Tere Liye Maine Thami Re Mala" – Asha Bhosle, Jaspal Singh
2. "Holi Hai Ho Ho La La La" – Jaspal Singh, Asha Bhosle
3. "Teri Palko Ke Tale" – Jaspal Singh
4. "Jab Talak Dum Me Dum" – Asha Bhosle
5. "Is Mitti Ke Kan Kan Ka" – Mahendra Kapoor
