= Jayanta Nath =

Indian Singer

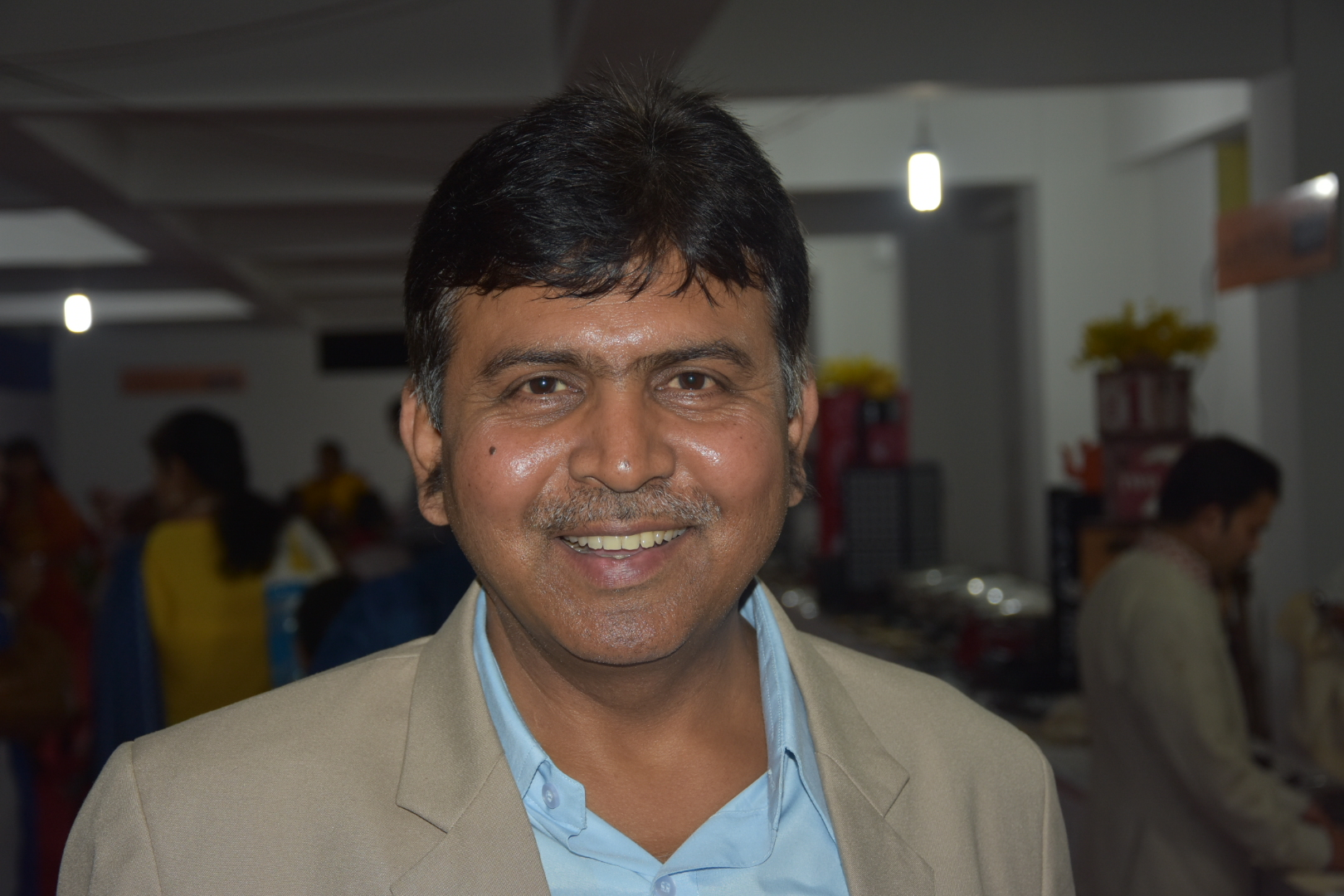

Background information
- Born: 20 May 1964 (age 61); Gossaigaon, Assam
- Origin: Assam, India
- Genres: Assamese pop, Alternative
- Occupation(s): Singer, composer, music director, film director
- Years active: 1984–present
- Labels: Telescope Records; N.K. Production
- Website: www.jayantanath.in

Jayanta Nath (born 20 May 1964) is an Indian singer, composer, music director, film director from Jorhat, Assam. His contributions are mostly in Assamese music, Assamese film industry and Mobile theatre of Assam. He has composed more than five hundred songs in Assamese and other regional languages

== Discography ==
=== Albums ===
Year	Album	Song	Length
2018	Best of Jayanta Nath	Hahire Sokulu Dhaki	3:59
2018	Best of Jayanta Nath	Polash Bonot	5:07
2018	Best of Jayanta Nath	Jodi Mur Gaanor Hure	5:03
2018	Best of Jayanta Nath	Aai Mur Axomi	5:17
2018	Best of Jayanta Nath	Xudha Kontho	5:45
2018	Best of Jayanta Nath	Ghon Ghur	5:35
2018	Best of Jayanta Nath	Jonotar	4:25
2018	Best of Jayanta Nath	Mur E Kontho	4:36
2018	Best of Jayanta Nath	Palehi	4:22
2018	Best of Jayanta Nath	Mur Jibonere	4:17

Year	Album	Song	Length
2019	Buku Bhori	Buku Bhori	3:56
2019	Buku Bhori	Ajanite Muk	4:11
2019	Buku Bhori	Jibon Bhora	5:16
2019	Buku Bhori	Prem	5:38
2019	Buku Bhori	Tumar Moromere	4:33
2019	Buku Bhori	Mur Prem	5:00
2019	77B Golf Club Road	Aamar Somajor (Remastered)	5:01
2019	77B Golf Club Road	Aaji Idor (Remastered)	6:56

=== Extended plays ===
Year	EP	Song	Composer (s)	Co-artist (s)	Note
1998	Moromor Pansoi	"Moromor Pansoi"	Jayanta Nath	Santa Uzir	
1998	Moromor Pansoi	"Phule Phule Sumile Moromot" (Male Version)	Jayanta Nath, Bhupen Uzir	Solo	Sampled Tamil song "Netru Illadha Maatram" from Pudhiya Mugam by Sujatha Mohan.
1998	Moromor Pansoi	"Dilehi Suma Kore"	Jayanta Nath	Solo	
1998	Moromor Pansoi	"Phule Phule Sumile Moromot" (Sad Version)	A.R. Rahman	Santa Uzir	Sampled Tamil song "Netru Illadha Maatram" from Pudhiya Mugam by Sujatha Mohan.

=== Singles ===
Year	Album	Song	Length
2018	Kusumber Putra	Kusumber Putra	4:58
2019	Shilpi Tumi	Shilpi Tumi	5:07
2020	Shilpi Tumi (Alternative Version)	Shilpi Tumi (Alternative Version)	4:09
2020	Endhare Endhare	Endhare Endhare	5:36

== Public Performances ==
Jayanta Nath had performed in various stages across Assam during the period of Bihu. He was invited by the Assam Society, UAE to perform on Rongali Bihu celebration in 2006, along with actor Jatin Bora. In the year 2010, he was invited again to be a part of this celebration.

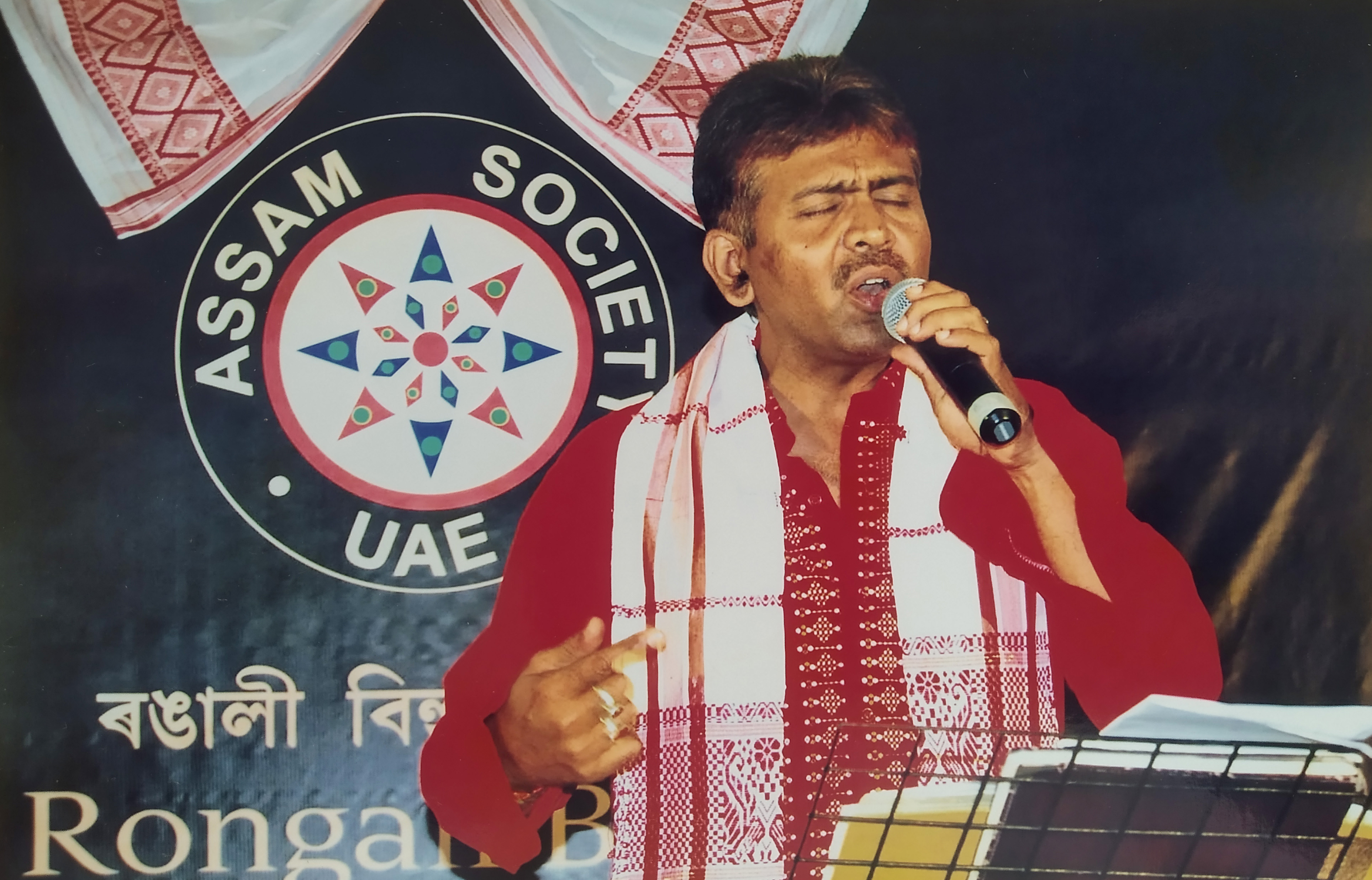
Jayanta Naths performance on Assam Society, UAE's Rongali Bihu celebration

== Movies ==
Title	Year	Credited as	Notes	Ref.
Pratidan	1987	Assistant Director		
Bordoisila	1989	Assistant Director		
Jakhini	1991	Assistant Director		
Rickshawala	1993	Music Director, Assistant Director		
Urvashi	1995	Assistant Director		
Sanghat	1999	Associate Director		
Hriday Kapowa Gaan	2004	Director, Music Director		
Karma Ke Rati	2013	Director, Music Director	Best film other than Assamese, Prag Cine Awards 2014	
Wide Angle	2024	Director, Music Director	Based on Dr. Nagen Saikia's short story	
