= Jhamu Sughand =

Indian Film Producer (1951–2008)

Jhamu Sughand (1951 – 26 May 2008) was an Indian film financier, producer and distributor, in mainstream Bollywood, as well parallel cinema. He is most known as producer of Academy Award-nominated Lagaan (2001), Satya (1998), Hum Dil De Chuke Sanam (1999), Aks (2001) and Bombay (1995).

He started Jhamu Sughand Productions, also produced films in Marathi and Bengali, and was awarded the 2000 National Film Award for Best Feature Film in Marathi as the producer of Astitva directed by Mahesh Manjrekar, and subsequently National Film Award for Best Feature Film for Kaalpurush directed by Buddhadeb Dasgupta.

== Career ==
Sughand started his career joining his family cloth trading business in Deolali, his hometown, and in 1979 he moved to Mumbai. Here started a printing press specialising in film merchandise for some years, before shifting to film distribution in 1988. In the coming years, he distributed over 100 films, but it was Mani Ratnam's, Bombay (1995) which first got him acclaim.

In later years, he stopped producing films, eventually selling one of his last films, Gulaal directed by Anurag Kashyap, which was eventually released in 2009.

He died on 26 May 2008, of cardiac arrest at the age of 57. He had suffered a brain stroke a few days earlier. He is survived by his wife, son and daughter.

== Filmography ==
=== Producer ===
- Rangeela (1995)
- Bombay (1995, Tamil)
- Hindustani (1996, Tamil)
- Daud (1997)
- Chachi 420 (1997)
- Earth (1998, executive producer)
- Hum Dil De Chuke Sanam (1999)
- Khoobsurat (1999)
- Astitva (2000, Marathi)
- Lagaan (2001)
- Aks (2001)
- Filhaal... (2002)
- Hum Kisise Kum Nahin (2002)
- Swapner Din (2004, Bengali)
- Kalpurush (2005, Bengali)
- Secrets and Lies (2007, Documentary)
- Janmadata (2008, Bengali)

=== Distributor ===
- Black Friday (2007)
- Janmadata (2008, Bengali)

== Awards ==
- National Film Awards
  - 2000 Best Feature Film in Marathi (producer): Astitva
  - 2005: Best Feature Film (producer): Kaalpurush
- IIFA Awards
  - 2000: Best Movie (producer): Hum Dil De Chuke Sanam
