= Shoebite =

- Directed by: Shoojit Sircar
- Produced by: Ronnie Screwvala
- Starring: Amitabh Bachchan; Sarika; Dia Mirza; Jimmy Sheirgill
- Production company: UTV Motion Pictures
- Country: India
- Language: Hindi

Shoebite is an unreleased film directed by Shoojit Sircar and produced by UTV Motion Pictures. It chronicles the story of a man in his early 60s, starring Amitabh Bachchan, in the lead role. The film is based on the story, Labour Of Love, by M. Night Shyamalan. The lyrics are penned by Gulzar.

During production, the movie was titled Johnny Mastana and later Johnny Walker.

== Plot ==
Shoebite is the story of a man in his early 60s named John Pereira who sets out on a journey of self-discovery.

== Cast ==
- Amitabh Bachchan as John Pereira
- Sarika as Aditi
- Shrysh Zutshi as Young John Pereira
- Sanjeeda Shaikh as Young Aditi
- Dia Mirza
- Jimmy Sheirgill
- Nawazuddin Siddiqui
- Apurva Mathur
- Preeti Nigam
- Suresh Gera

== Production ==
=== Filming ===
During the Manali schedule of the film, the shooting unit converted the Snow and Avalanche Study Establishment (SASE) into a hospital.

Percept Picture Company announced the film under the title Johnny Walker starring Bachchan and directed by Sircar, but the film was never made. Sircar took the film to UTV Motion Pictures, renaming it Shoebite. Percept filed a lawsuit against UTV seeking to prevent Shoebite from being made. After a long legal battle, the lawsuit was dismissed in 2012. The production of the film has been speculated to be stalled. Sircar, instead got Vicky Donor released, since he started to face delays in Shoebite. In March 2018, Bachchan requested the makers to release the film in his tweet, saying "Yes... put aside the internal debate, issues, or personal view points and give this labour of love from Shoojit Sircar a chance for others to appreciate this novel story and film... Please..."
