= Karma Ke Rati =

Assamese-Sadri Film

- Film poster
- Directed by: Jayanta Nath
- Written by: Shiv Prasad Rai
- Produced by: Dhruba Jyoti Phukan
- Starring: Bishnu Kharghoria; Lobin Das; Aimee Baruah; Rajkumar Aryan; Rimpi Das; Prince Chauhan; Trishna Kurmi; Podmaraag Goswami
- Cinematography: Suman Duwarah
- Edited by: Niranjan Gogoi
- Music by: Jayanta Nath
- Production company: Shiva Shakti Films
- Distributed by: Telescope Movies
- Release date: 12 July 2013
- Running time: 130 minutes
- Country: India
- Languages: Sadri, Assamese

Karma Ke Rati is a 2013 Assamese-Sadri film by Jayanta Nath on Tea-garden community of Assam. The movie revolves around an incident happened in the annual Karam (festival) celebrated by the Tea-garden community of Assam.

== Plot ==
The movie is set mostly in a tea estate of Sepon, Assam. An Ideal teacher "Sagar", who leads a group of youth to fight against corrupted officials through education is the main plot of the film. The film also features a Jhumair song, the main attraction of Karam (festival) which is the climax.

== Cast ==
- Lobin Das as Sagar Mastar
- Aimee Baruah as Laxmi Nayak
- Rajkumar Aryan as Suresh Nayak
- Rimpi Das as Papori
- Prince Chauhan as David
- Trishna Kurmi as Marry
- Bishnu Kharghoria as Mr. Baruah
- Podmaraag Goswami as Robin

== Soundtrack ==
Karma Ke Rati

Soundtrack album by Jayanta Nath
- Released: 12 July 2013
- Genre: Feature film soundtrack
- Language: Assamese
- Label: Telescope Records

Jayanta Nath chronology
Hriday Kapowa Gaan (2004)	Karma Ke Rati (2013)	Wide Angle (2024)

Film Contains four songs composed by Jayanta Nath and choreographed by . One of the song is a traditional Jhumair song in Sadri language. This was the last film of composer Jayanta Nath until Wide Angle, released in 2024, 11 years later.

No.	Title	Lyrics	Artist(s)	Length
1.	"Jhumur"	Shiv Prasad Rai	Dulal Manki, Jaya Irani, Indira Devi, Rupa Borah	4:14
2.	"Sa Re Ga Ma Pa"	Shiv Prasad Rai	Jaya Irani	4:53
3.	"Sajani"	Rajdeep Krishna Rao	Jayanta Nath, Jaya Irani	4:32
4.	"Chal Chal"	Shiv Prasad Rai	Jayanta Nath, Indira Devi	5:20

== Awards ==
The film awarded with "Best Film other than Asaamese" in Prag Cine Awards 2014 and Moonlight Media Award for "Best Music Director".

== See also ==
- Jollywood
- Prag Cine Awards 2014
