= Achyut Lahkar =

Indian dramatist

Achyut Lahkar (9 July 1931– 12 June 2016) was the father of the Bhryamyman or Mobile theatre, and gave birth to the mobile theatre in Assam in the 1960s. He founded the popular Natraj Theatre at Pathsala in 1963 which performed across Assam and in other states for nearly 40 years. He was a pioneering dramatist, actor, director and producer and staged numerous memorable plays on the mobile theatre stage. He also published and edited an illustrated magazine called Deepawali for some time. He was awarded the Kamal Kumari National Award in 1997.
