= Theatre Surjya =

Mobile theatre group in Assam, India

- Promotional image of 2015-2016 Theatre Surjya.
- Address: Sarthebari, Assam; India
- Owner: Munindra Barman

Construction
- Opened: 2015

Website
- http://facebook.com/theatresurjya

The Theatre Surjya (Assamese: থিয়েটাৰ সূৰ্য্য) is a new mobile theatre group of the North-Eastern Indian state of Assam, founded by Munindra Barman in 2015. It was launched in a big way in 2015-16 season. The main actors which were signed for the 2015-16 season are Tapan Das, Chinmoy Kotoky, Rajkumar, Devismita and Bhranti Medhi. For 2016-17 season famous actor Jatin Bora was signed by the theatre. In 2022-23, Moi Sendur Nolow is one of the most popular drama with lead actress Debashree Das.

== List of Plays ==
Season	Play	Playwright	Starring
2015–16	Army	Abhijeet Bhattacharya	Tapan Das, Rajkumar, Bhranti Medhi, Chinmoy Kotoky, etc.
2015–16	Bhagawan	Abhijeet Bhattacharya	Tapan Das, Rajkumar, Bhranti Medhi, Chinmoy Kotoky, etc.
2015–16	Dandanayak	Sebabrat Baruah	Tapan Das, Rajkumar, Bhranti Medhi, Chinmoy Kotoky, etc.
2016–17	Tyajyaputra	Abhijeet Bhattacharya	Jatin Bora, Bhranti Medhi, Chinmoy Kotoky, etc.
2016–17	Bodyguard	Abhijeet Bhattacharya	Jatin Bora, Bhranti Medhi, Chinmoy Kotoky, etc.
2016–17	Montri Mahoday	Abhijeet Bhattacharya	Jatin Bora, Bhranti Medhi, Chinmoy Kotoky, etc.
2017-18	Mahanayak	Abhijeet Bhattacharya	Jatin Bora, Itee Phukan etc.
2017-18	Dadagiri	Abhijeet Bhattacharya	Jatin Bora, Itee Phukan etc.
2017-18	Kokdeuta Nati aru Hati	Abhijeet Bhattacharya	Jatin Bora, Itee Phukan etc.
2018-19	Moromor Xodagor	Abhijeet Bhattacharya	Utpal Das, Munmi Phookan, Sanjib Sharma etc.
2018-19	Ejoni Buwarir Mrityu	Abhijeet Bhattacharya	Utpal Das, Munmi Phookan, Sanjib Sharma etc.
2018-19	Kolija	Abhijeet Bhattacharya	Utpal Das, Munmi Phookan, Sanjib Sharma etc.
2019-20	Mafiya Karna	Abhijeet Bhattacharya	Sanjib Sharma, Dipankar Roy, Devashree Das, Meenakshi Gogoi, Mridul Chutiya
2019-20	Iman Morom Kio Lage	Abhijeet Bhattacharya	Sanjib Sharma, Dipankar Roy, Devashree Das, Meenakshi Gogoi, Mridul Chutiya
2019-20	Maharan	Mridul Chutiya	Sanjib Sharma, Dipankar Roy, Devashree Das, Meenakshi Gogoi, Mridul Chutiya
2022-23	Moi Xendur Nolou	Abhijeet Bhattacharya	Sanjib Sharma, Devashree Das, Pranjit Das, Navajyoti Kashyap etc.
2022-23	Shakuntala	Abhijeet Bhattacharya	Sanjib Sharma, Devashree Das, Pranjit Das, Navajyoti Kashyap etc.
2022-23	Parashuramor Preyoxi	Prasanta Mena	Sanjib Sharma, Devashree Das, Pranjit Das, Navajyoti Kashyap etc.
2023-24	Pholo Xoijyat Jui	Abhijeet Bhattacharya	Mridul Bhuyan, Pallabi Phukon etc.
2023-24	Mur Kesuwai Kandise	Abhijeet Bhattacharya	Mridul Bhuyan, Pallabi Phukon etc.
2023-24	Karagarot Kolija	Prasanta Mena	Mridul Bhuyan, Pallabi Phukon etc.
