= Shakuntala Aru Sankar Joseph Ali =

- Directed by: Nip Barua
- Starring: Mridula Baruah; Tapan Das; Nipon Goswami; Abdul Majid
- Music by: Ramen Baruah
- Release date: 1984
- Country: India
- Language: Assamese

Shakuntala Aru Sankar Joseph Ali is a 1984 Indian Assamese language film directed by Nip Barua. The film stars Mridula Baruah, Nipon Goswami and Tapan Das in the lead roles. The music of the film was composed by Ramen Baruah.

== Cast ==
- Mridula Baruah as Shakuntala
- Tapan Das as Akan
- Nipon Goswami as Sankar Joseph Ali
- Amala Kataki
- Abdul Majid
