= Kadamtole Krishna Nache =

- Directed by: Suman Haripriya
- Screenplay by: Suman Haripriya
- Produced by: Suman Haripriya; Ranajit Chakravorty
- Starring: Saurabh Hazarika; Tapan Das; Jayanta Bhagabati; Aimee Baruah; Runu Devi; Rupsikha
- Production company: Haripriya Production Pvt. Ltd.
- Release date: 2 September 2005
- Running time: 123 minutes
- Country: India
- Language: Assamese

Kadamtole Krishna Nache (Assamese: কদমতলে কৃষ্ণ নাচে) is an Assamese drama film written and directed by Suman Haripriya. This film was released on 2 September 2005. This film was awarded as Best Assamese Film in 53rd National Film Awards.

== Cast ==
- Aimee Baruah
- Saurabh Hazarika
- Tapan Das
- Jayanta Bhagabati
- Runu Devi
- Rupsikha

== Screenings ==
The film was selected for the Diaspora Film Festival, in New York.
