= Rahul Dholakia =

Indian director

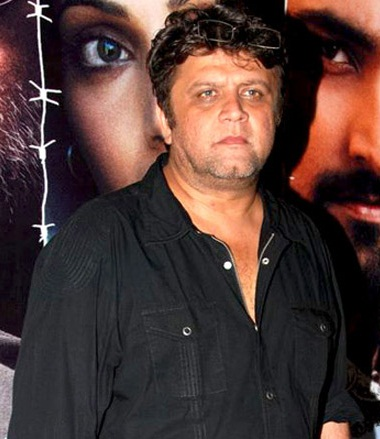
- Dholakia in 2012
- Born: Mumbai, India
- Occupations: Film director, producer, screenwriter
- Years active: 2002–present
- Website: Rahul Dholakia

Rahul Dholakia is an Indian film director, producer, and screenwriter. He is best known for his National Film Award-winning film, Parzania (Heaven & Hell On Earth) (2005). Before making Parzania, he directed documentaries like Teenage Parents and New York Taxi Drivers.

== Early life and education ==
Born in Mumbai, to Raksha and Parry Dholakia, an advertising professional, Rahul also has an elder sister Moha. After completing his schooling from Campion School, Mumbai and Jamnabai Narsee School in Mumbai, he went on to do his Bachelors in Science from St. Xavier's College, Mumbai.

== Career ==
While still in college he started working in his father's advertising agency, Mora Ava. He also worked with producer Babla Sen, for project for Channel 4, London, as production assistant and 10 documentaries later became a producer himself. Later, he started working with Everest Advertising in Mumbai as an assistant, growing up to become a producer.

Thereafter, he moved to New York City in 1990, where, he did his master's degree in filmmaking from the New York Institute of Technology, and has been in India and Corona, California, United States ever since. After making a couple of documentaries and commercials, and even running TV station, called 'TV Asia' for a while, he made his feature film debut with the Hindi-English bilingual, Kehtaa Hai Dil Baar Baar (2002), starring Paresh Rawal and Jimmy Shergill. His next film based on a real-life story of 10-year-old Parsi boy, Azhar Mody, known as Parzan, who disappeared during the 28 February 2002 Gulbarg Society massacre, which took place during communal riots in Gujarat in 2002, Parzania won him the National Film Award for 2006.

After shooting in Kashmir, his next film Lamhaa, where Sanjay Dutt and Bipasha Basu played the leads in a story based in Kashmir, was released to mixed reviews. he has directed the film Raees, which was released on 25 January 2017 and received positive reviews. Dholakia's upcoming film Agni is set to release in 2024.

== Filmography ==
Year	Film	Director	Producer	Writer	Notes
2002	Kehtaa Hai Dil Baar Baar	Yes	No	No	
2007	Parzania	Yes	Yes	Yes	National Film Award for Best Direction
2008	Mumbai Cutting	Yes	No	Yes	segment "Bombay Mumbai Same Shit"
2010	Lamhaa	Yes	No	Yes	
2017	Raees	Yes	No	Yes	
2024	Agni	Yes	No	Yes	Released on Amazon Prime Video

== Awards and honours ==
Year	Award	Film	Category	Result	Ref
2007	National Film Awards	Parzania	Best Director	Won	
2008	Filmfare Awards	Parzania	Best Story	Nominated	
2008	Filmfare Awards	Parzania	Best Screenplay	Nominated	
2008	Screen Awards	Parzania	Ramnath Goenka Memorial Award	Won	
