= Suman Haripriya =

Indian film director, producer and politician

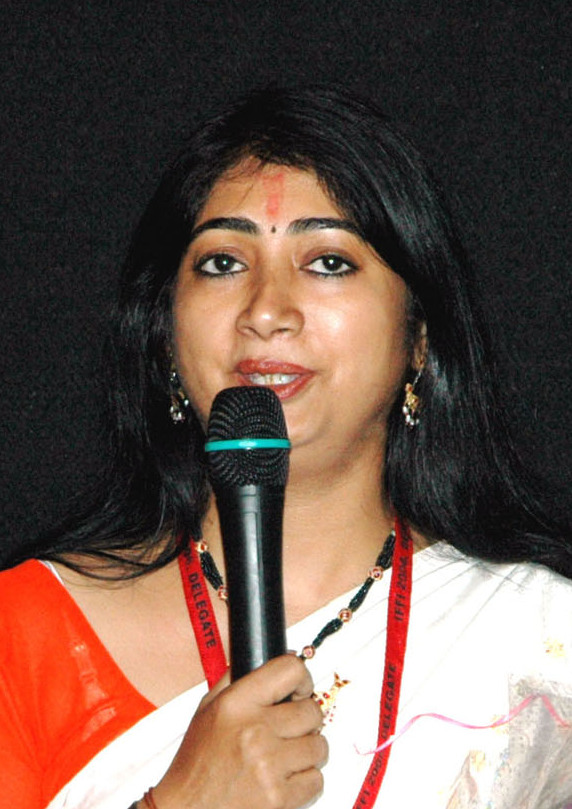
- Haripriya in 2006

Member of the Assam Legislative Assembly
- Incumbent
- Assumed office 19 May 2016
- Preceded by: Dwipen Pathak
- Constituency: Hajo

Personal details
- Born: 1 June 1979 (age 46) Guwahati, Assam, India
- Party: Bharatiya Janata Party
- Parent: Bijoya Chakravarty (mother)
- Education: M.A., (Sociology)
- Profession: Politician; Indian Film Producer and Director

Suman Haripriya (born 1 June 1979) is an Indian film director, producer and politician who is serving as the Member of the Assam Legislative Assembly representing Hajo constituency since 2016 as a member of the Bharatiya Janata Party (BJP).

== Personal life ==
Haripriya was born on 1 June 1979 in Guwahati to Jiten Chakravarty and Bijoya Chakravarty. Her mother, Bijoya Chakravarty is ex-Member of Parliament of the BJP from Gauhati. Haripriya holds Master of Arts in Sociology from New Delhi's Jamia Millia Islamia, Diploma in Film and Television from Noida's Asian Academy of Film & Television and Jyotish Acharya from New Delhi's Bharatiya Vidya Bhavan.

== Career ==
=== Film ===
Haripriya is associated with Assamese cinema. She has directed few Assamese movies. Her film Kadamtole Krishna Nache (2005) received the Best Assamese Film in 53rd National Film Awards.

=== Political ===
As a BJP politician, Haripriya was elected in Assam Legislative Assembly election in 2016 from Hajo.

== Public image ==
Haripriya has suggested that cow urine and cow dung could be used against the coronavirus. She stated that, "Cow dung has many benefits. I think it can kill the coronavirus. Cow urine can also be useful." She has also suggested that cancer can be cured with cow dung and cow urine.

== Filmography ==
=== Direction ===
Year	Title	Notes
2001	Koina Mur Dhunia	Debut film as director
2002	Kokadeutar Gharjonwai	
2005	Kadamtole Krishna Nache	Best Assamese Film in 53rd National Film Awards
