= Kaalpurush (2005 film) =

Kalpurush
- Poster of Kalpurush
- Directed by: Buddhadev Dasgupta
- Written by: Buddhadev Dasgupta
- Produced by: Sanjay Routray; Jhamu Sughand
- Starring: Mithun Chakraborty; Rahul Bose; Sameera Reddy; Shraman Mukherjee
- Cinematography: Sudeep Chatterjee
- Edited by: Sanjib Datta
- Music by: Biswadep Dasgupta
- Production company: Matchbox Pictures
- Release dates: 24 July 2005 (New Delhi Festival of Asian Cinema); 25 April 2008 (India)
- Country: India
- Language: Bengali

Kaalpurush or Kalpurush (English name: Memories in the Mist) is a 2005 Indian Bengali drama film directed and written by Buddhadev Dasgupta. The film stars Mithun Chakraborty and Rahul Bose in lead roles.

The 120 minute version of the film screened at the Toronto International Film Festival. Although the film was completed in 2005, it was released in India in 2008. The film won National Film Award for Best Feature Film in 2006 and Mithun being nominated for best actor category.

== Plot ==
The film tells the story in a non-linear fashion, with two timelines being depicted simultaneously. Rahul Bose has a dysfunctional marriage with Sameera Reddy who has an extra-marital affair. Rahul tries to reconnect with his long-lost father (played by Mithun Chakraborty), while Sameera dreams of breaking free of her stifling domestic life. Rahul is considered as a failure both in professional and personal lives. However, an honest and simple man, he clings to simple joys of life and memories of his childhood. The back-and-forth movement of the story between two timelines (the present day and Rahul's childhood) and the arrangement of the sequences make Mithun a mystery man—he could be dead, alive, or, just a figment of Rahul's imagination.

Laboni Sarkar, portraying the character of Mithun's wife in the film

The film begins as Mithun follows Rahul as the latter returns home from a day's work. Rahul is shown to be a doting father, but a failed husband. Mithun then starts to tell his own story. He had a happy family with wife (Laboni Sarkar) and the adolescent son Sumanata. A past flame of Mithun, played by Sudipta Chakraborty, incidentally arrives in the village (as a part of a masked dance troupe) and meets Mithun. At one unrestrained moment, she tries to seduce Mithun. Mithun tries to resist. However, Mithun's wife, Laboni, sees a glimpse of them in a compromising situation. Laboni, pained by the betrayal, decides to leave Mithun, with their son in tow. While a devastated Mithun becomes a footloose traveller, their son bears the scar for the rest of his life. Back to the present, father and son come face to face to heal old wounds.

Battling the brunts of a society that defines success too materialistically, Rahul also continues to relive his childhood memories. His wife, Sameera, meanwhile flies to the United States to spend an extended holiday with her brother's family settled there. She writes several travelogues. Rahul suddenly meets his father one day in a Calcutta street. He spends a memorable day with his father, reliving their memories, as well as discussing many aspects of life. Suddenly, Mithun disappears.

Rahul's wife returns from USA, and tells him that she has been in an extra-marital relationship for long, and their children are actually not fathered by Rahul. Rahul says that he knows everything, and still loves their children. Soon, Sameera leaves Rahul. Rahul continues to live with their children.

Towards the end of the film, Rahul again has a talk with his father, Mithun. Mithun tells him that many things in life remain unsaid, untouched. Mithun goes on to tell that after Mithun's wife, Laboni, left him, he wandered off to many places, finally one day, committing suicide. So, at the end, viewers understand that their suspicion was true that Mithun and all the talks between Rahul and Mithun were nothing but the imagination of Rahul's sensitive mind. Rahul continues to be a doting father.

The film has several fantasy-like characters appearing several times. The old flute-seller, Idrish, and his son, Abdul, are such a pair of characters. Rahul once met them in his childhood. However, the duo appears several times in the film, especially in the moments when there is a voice-over of Mithun, or when Rahul is reliving some old memories. Masked troupes of village dancers also make several appearances.

== Cast ==
- Mithun Chakraborty as Father
- Rahul Bose as Son
- Sameera Reddy as Supriya
- Sudipta Chakraborty
- Laboni Sarkar
- Meenakshi Goswami
- Shraman Mukherjee as Rahul Bose's childhood
