= Mobile theatre in Assam =

Form of theatre in India

Mobile Theatre (As: ভ্ৰাম্যমাণ থিয়েটাৰ), also known as Bhramyaman, is a form of popular theatre exclusive to Assam. Unlike street plays, mobile theatre groups travel from place to place with their cast, singers, musicians, dancers and crew, often carrying tents and seating with them.

== History ==
Founder: Achyut Lahkar, widely recognized as the father of Assamese mobile theatre, started this unique form of entertainment, blending traditional performance with commercial theatre. Origin: The concept developed from a desire to bring professional theatrical performances to rural areas of Assam. Growth: Following Nataraj Theatre's success, the industry expanded, and now, over 60 theatre groups operate throughout the state annually. The Kohinoor Opera was also one of the first few mobile theatre group of Assam, founded by Natyacharya Brajanath Sarma. Kohinoor Opera performed dramas, attracting thousands of spectators, from Dhubri to Sadiya. The first Mobile Theatre play was staged on 2 October 1963, in Pathsala. Achyut Lahkar is known as the father of Mobile Theatre. Lahkar's group, the Pathsala-based Nataraj Cine Theatre, was popular during the early years. His productions included: Bhogjora, Tikendrajit, Black Money, Beula. Lahkar took Mobile Theatres to Bihar, West Bengal and Uttar Pradesh. They collaborated with artists from multiple states. An industry with an annual turnover of around 100 million, the Mobile Theatre of Assam provide a source of entertainment that has progressively upgraded its stature.

== Form ==
The Mobile Theatre of Assam has things in common with traditional act plays from all over India, however Mobile Theatre is more advanced technically and evolved from mythological stories, to contemporary themes. The self-contained nature of Mobile Theatre allows performances in small villages without their own performance spaces, which was particularly important in villages without electricity for television. Troupes offer plays including adaptations of popular Assamese novels, Greek Classics and Hollywood blockbusters. There are over 30 mobile theatre groups in Assam, most of them based in Pathsala. In mid-September, after two months of rehearsals, the groups begin their seven-month tour in Assam.

== Special effects ==
In 2008 Kohinoor Theatre staged Abuj Dora, Achin Kanya, the tale of a dwarf and his two friends of normal size. Jatin Bora played three roles. In one he was transformed in a dwarf. From lighting effects to specially tailored clothes and help from technicians, the producers were able to preserve the illusion. A local version of Superman was put on by Ashirbad Theatre. The protagonist flew around the stage with powers provided by his costume. In Deboraj Theatre's play, the role of a Dracula inspired Vampire appeared on stage. The group brought to life the blood sucking scenes in the play with technical help. Kohinoor Theatre also produced the drama-version of the James Cameron's Oscar-winning film "Titanic" on the stage.

== Dance drama ==
Some theatre groups precede the main play with a short Nritya Natika or dance drama (নৃত্য-নাটিকা) which is mostly dance based. Here dialogues are recited from background and the artists are supposed to mime it accordingly.

== See also ==
- Achyut Lahkar
- Kohinoor Theatre
- Brindabon Theatre
- Theatre Surjya
- Sudarshan Theatre
