= Nagen Saikia =

Indian writer

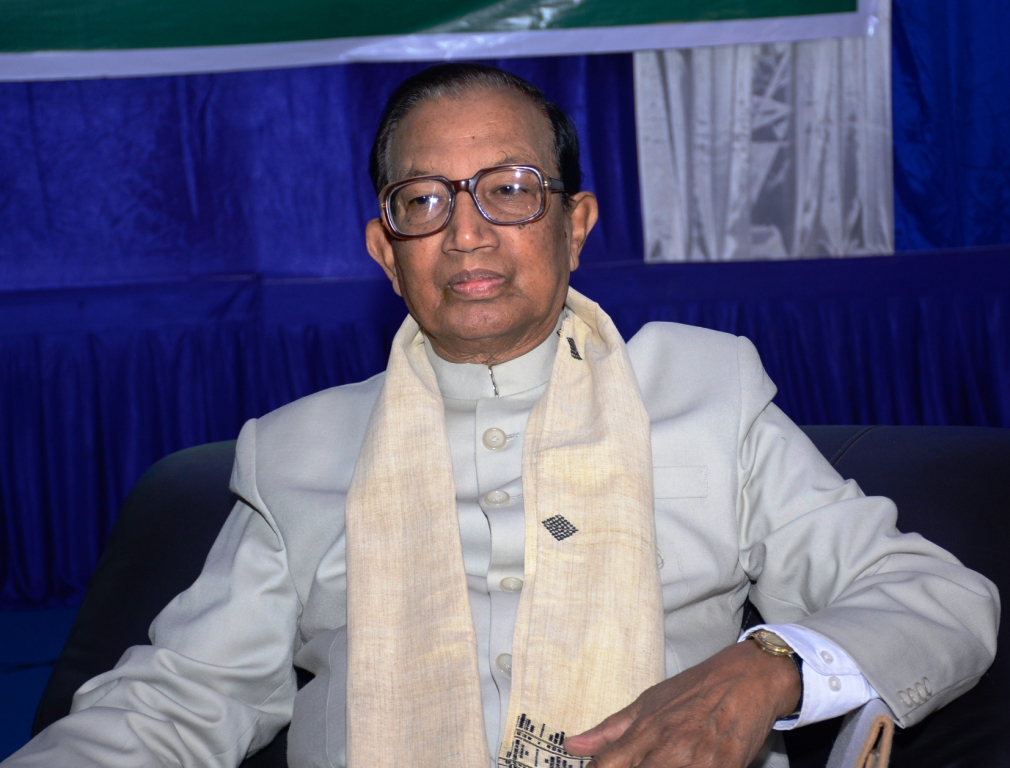
- Born: 11 February 1939 (age 87); Golaghat, Assam Province, British Raj
- Citizenship: Indian
- Occupations: • Professor in Dibrugarh University, • Former member of the Rajya Sabha from 1986-1992.
- Writing career
- Language: Assamese
- Notable work: Mit-Bhash (মিতভাষ)
- Notable awards: Sahitya Akademi Award (1997); Assam Valley Literary Award (2007)

Nagen Saikia (born 11 February 1939) is an Indian writer. He was formerly a professor at Dibrugarh University. Saikia had also been a member of the Rajya Sabha from 1986 to 1992 and was the vice-chairman of the Upper House from 1990 to 1992. Saikia started his career as a teacher and went on to serve in different reputed institutions in various categories. He also delivered lectures on various topics about Assamese literature, including in the US and England. He has published numerous literary essays, short stories, novels, books and articles to his credit. Saikia was conferred with the Sahitya Akademi award in 1997 for his short stories collection Andharat Nizar Mukh and was honoured by the Mohan Chandra Sahitya Sabha in 1980 for Chinta aru Charcha. He was conferred the Fellow of Sahitya Akademi, the highest honour conferred by the prestigious Literary body of the Nation, the Sahitya Akademi on the most distinguished Indian writers.

== Early life ==
Saikia was born in 1939 in Hatiakhowa to Umaram Saikia and Hemaprabha Saikia, in the Golaghat district of Assam. He started his primary education in Borkathoni L.P. School and later went to Kakodonga M.E. School. He passed his matriculation from Dhekial H. E. School in 1957, securing first division. In 1959, he passed his I. A. (Higher Secondary) from Jagannath Barooah College, Jorhat. He was graduated from Debraj Roy College, Golaghat in 1961. He had done his Post- Graduation in Assamese (Literature) from Gauhati University, Guwahati in 1964. He did his Ph. D. from Dibrugarh University in 1982 under the supervision of Mahendra Borah for his thesis A Critical Study of the Social and Intellectual Background of Modern Assamese Literature 1826-1903.

== Career ==
Nagen Saikia started his professional career as a teacher in Hatiakhowa H.E. School and Dhekial H. E. School from 1959 to 1965. He served as an Assistant Editor in Asom Batori in 1965. From 1965 to 1971, Nagen Saikia served as a lecturer in Assamese in the Diphu Government College, Jorhat College and the Devicharan Barua Girls' College. In 1972, he joined as a lecturer in the Department of Assamese in Dibrugarh University and continued till 1986. During this period, he also served as a Secretary of the Co-ordination Committee for publication of textbooks in Assamese at Dibrugarh University. Saikia had also been a member of the Rajya Sabha from 1986-1992 and was the vice-chairman of the Upper House from 1990-1992.
In 1992, Saikia joined as Professor of the Lakshminath Bezbaroa Chair in the Department of Assamese in Dibrugarh University. He was an editor of Natun Dainik, an Assamese daily in 2003 and Amar Asom in 2004-06.

Travel Abroad

- Being invited as the Guest Speaker, delivered lectures on ‘Contributions of American Baptist Missionaries towards the Development of Modern Assamese Literature' in the United States in 1988, under the auspices of Assam Association of North America.
- Travelled China as a member of the Five-Member-Delegation of Indian Writers, in 1993, organised by Sahitya Akademi.
- Travelled to England to deliver Lectures on Sankardeva in October (1998).

Honorary Office:

- General Secretary, Asam Sahitya Sabha (1973-1976, 1980-1985)
- Member (at different times) of the Executive Committee, Book Selection Committee, Jatiya Nyas Samiti, Editorial Board of The Patrika, Literary Award Committees, Committee for planning and programmes, etc. of Assam Sahitya Sabha.
- Member, (at different times) General Body, Executive Committee, Encyclopedia Committee, Award Committee, Book Planning Committee, Administrative Reform Committee etc. of the Publication Board, Assam.
- Member, Assamese Advisory Board, Sahitya Akademi (1975-1985, 1993-1998, 2003-2008)
- Member, General Council, Sahitya Akademi (1993-1998)
- Member, Authors’ Guild of India (1974)
- Member-Convenor, Assamese Bhasa Samiti, Saraswati Samman, New Delhi (1991-1994).
- Member, Court of the North-Eastern Hill University, Shillong (1989-1992).
- Member, Chayan Parishad, Saraswati Samman (1993-1996)
- Member, Advisory Committee, Tai Language Course, Dibrugarh University (1992-2003).
- Member, Executive Council & Court Dibrugarh University and thereby member in other Committees.
- Member, Editorial Board, Prakas (Assamese Monthly) (1990-1992).
- Member, Editorial Board, ‘Samjna’ (Assamese Monthly) (1975-1978).
- Editor, Sampratik, Poetry Magazine (1971).
- Chief Editor, Brahmaputra (for a short time), Assamese monthly (1985).
- President, Natakam, a Theatre Group (1966-1968) Jorhat, Assam.
- Member, Advisory Committee to the Education Minister, Assam (1986-1990).
- Member, State Advisory Committee for preservation of Cultural Identity (1986-1990).
- Member, Advisory Board of Implementation of Educational Scheme for Tea Garden Population of Assam (1986-1990).
- Vice-Chairman, State Level National Integration Council (1987-1990)
- Member, State Planning Board, Assam (1987-1990; 1998)
- Member, General Body, Srimanta Sankardev Kalakshetra (1987-1990, 1996-1999).
- Member, State Committee for Production of Textbooks (1981-1983).
- Member, Governing Body of the North East Zone Cultural Centre (186-1990).
- Different Committees of the Parliament (1986-1992).
- Member, Panel of Vice-Chairman, Rajya Sabha (1990-1992).
- Member, (President of India’s Nominee) of the Planning and Academic Committee, Tezpur University (1999-2004).
- Member, State Planning Board, Assam (1996-2000).
- Member, Governing Body, Eastern Zonal Cultural Centre, Kolkata, (1998-2002).
- Member, General Council of Anundaram Barooah Institute of Language, Art & Culture. (1996-1999).
- Editor, Uttarayan, an Assamese Literary Monthly 2000-2001.
- Member, Selection of Vice-Chancellor for Dibrugarh University (1992 & 1997)
- Subject Expert, Assamese (National Level).
- Member, Executive Committee of Comparative Literature Association of India.
- President, Sankari Sangeet Vidyapeeth (1997).
- Member, (Govt. of Assam Nominee) High Powered Committee, Literary and Culture Pensions (1997-2000).
- Member, Srimanta Sankardeva Award Selection Committee (1995-2000).
- Member, Expert Committee for Selection of Newspapers and Periodicals for Preservation in the Library, Kolkata (2003-2004).
- Jury Member of a few State and National Level Literary Awards.
- Member, International Comparative Literature Association.
- Member, Council for Development of Indian Languages, Govt. of India.

== Awards ==
- Mohan Chandra Sarma Award, 1980
- President, Literary Section, Sreemanta Sankaradeva Sangha, Dergaon Session, 1976
- Sahitya Akademi Award, 1997 for Short-story Collection Andharat Nijar Mukh
- Title Vidya-Nidhi, 1998 conferred by the International Buddhist Brotherhood Mission
- Assam Valley Literary Award, 2007 for total Literary Contribution.
- Hariprasad Rai Award, 2008.
- K. K. Handiqui Memorial Literary Award, 2009.
- Jagadhatri Haramohan Award, 2010.
- Sabda Sahitya Award, 2013
- People of the Year 2015 by Limca Book of Records, 2015
- D.Litt. by Dibrugarh University in 2016
- ERDF Excellence Award-2015 by ERD Foundation (University of Science and Technology, Meghalaya)

== Works ==
Fiction:

- Kuber Hati Barua(A collection of Short-stories), 1967
- Chabi Aru Frame(A collection of Short-stories), 1969
- Bandha Kothat Dhumuha (A collection of Short-stories), 1971
- Matir Chakir Jui (A collection of Short-stories), 1976
- Astitvar Sikali (A collection of Short-stories), 1976
- Aparthiva-Parthiva (A collection of Short-stories), 1982
- Andharat Nizar Mukh (A collection of Short-stories), 1995
- Bhagna Upakul (Novel), 1983
- Amerikat Dahdin (Travelogue), 1988
- Maha Chinar Dinlipi (Travelogue), 1994
- Swapna aru Smriti and Dhulir Dhemali (Autobiographies), 2002
- Hemanta Kalar Ati Gadhulit, (A collection of Short-Stories), 2001

Verses:

- Mita-Bhas ( A collection of short expressions, A new literary genre introduced by the author), 1995
- Swapna-Smriti-Visad (A collection of Mita-Bhas), 1997

Non-fiction:

- Background of Modern Assamese Literature, 1988
- Chinta Aru Charcha, 1980
- Unabimsa Satikar AsamiyaBhasar Samkat, 1988
- Bharatar Samskritik Aitijya aru Anyanya Rachana, 1993
- Agnigarbha Asam, 1993
- Asamiya Kabita aru Anyanya Bisay, 1996
- Gavesana-Padhati-Parichaya (A Book on Research Methodology in Assamese), 1996
- Tulanamulak Sahitya-Bichar (A book on Comparative Literature), 1996
- Sambadikata: Eti Gadhur aru Pavitra Dayitva, 2000
- Unavimsa Satikar Asam: Andhar aru Pohar, 2002?
- Ejan Santa Tantir Jevan-Kahini (Monograph on Kavir), 2001
- Byaktitvar Bhaskarayya
- Asamiya Varnamala, 2001
- Sahitya Badabaichitrya, 2003
- Maheswar Neog (Monograph)
- Anandachandra Baruah (Monograph)
- Sankardeva (Monograph)
- Asamiya Manuhar Itishas, 2013
