= David N. Donihue =

American poet

- Born: David Nelson Donihue; April 25, 1974 (age 52); Spokane, Washington, United States
- Other names: David Donihue; David N. Donihue
- Occupations: film director, producer, screenwriter, playwright, composer, actor poet
- Years active: 1985 - present

David Nelson Donihue (born April 25, 1974) is an American writer, director and actor. His writing has been mentioned by IndieWire and Variety and as a director he is frequently interview by magazines including 1.4 and Movie Maker Magazine. As a writer/director, his feature films such as Parzania and The Weathered Underground have been internationally distributed, and his recent mini-movies for Spinnin/Universal, Armada and others are viewed by many. Writer Kelly Hughes wrote in The Huffington Post that "Donihue's work is not superficial. It shocks.. It excites... It demands social change."

== Early years ==
Donihue was born in rural Eastern Washington, raised in Auburn, Washington. He started writing plays that were performed for 45 cents in his back yard and local parks when he was as young as seven. His first film was made when he was eleven, utilizing a rented video camera and two borrowed VCRs with stereo cables. His father was a pastor. His mother, Anita Corrine Donihue, was a special education teacher who later became a well known Christian Devotional author.

By his mid teens, Donihue was writing feature length plays. During these years, Donihue began to work graveyard shifts at a local college radio station, KGRG-FM, as an overnight DJ.

There, he became obsessed with experimental music and film, and directed a series of student films. These included Anthony's Apocalypse and Inside Anthony's World. During this era, at age 18, he wrote Hold My Hand & Tell Me I'm Not Insane, a comedy-drama about a young playwright whose scripts follow his life, yet later dictate it. The play was produced in Seattle with its premiere at the Scottish Rite Hall on Capitol Hill.

During his early twenties, Donihue wrote, directed, acted in and produced several independent plays within the northwest including Hey Baby Do Ya Wanna Come Back To My Place and Justify My Existence, and another pop psychology comedy Brain Aches And The Quest For Redemption Of A Telephone Psychic as well as the forty-minute Short film Love Me Tender, Pay Me Well.

In 1999 Donihue began performing under the stage name Punko and released an indie album titled The Day Bob Went Electric.

== Professional life ==
The English language thriller, based on the true story of the Gujarat Riots of 2002, which was initially banned in India, incited protests and bomb threats, and later garnered praise from The New York Times, Variety, and Indiewire. It was shown in New York as part of the Museum of Modern Arts' India Now film exhibition. Donihue was nominated for Filmfare Awards for Best Screenplay and Best Story for Parzania. The film won the Screen Gem Award for Best Picture.

In 2010, Donihue's four and a half hour interactive choose-your-own adventure film The Weathered Underground was released by Indican starring Heroes Brea Grant. The comic book inspired picture went on to become a small cult classic and is now shown as part of curriculum at many of the world's best film schools. In 2017, Donihue directed another socially driven action comedy, The Bang Brokers. In 2015 - 2017 Donihue wrote and directed several mini-movies for major brands and dance labels including SOLDIER, DON'T WAIT, GIMME SOME MORE, A LIFETIME AWAY and AGE OF INNOCENCE.

His writing has been commented on by the Los Angeles Times, and as a director he is frequently interview 1.4 and Movie Maker Magazine.

== Filmography ==
Year	Project	Credis	Type	Notes
1985	The Destruction of Thor	Writer, director and actor	Short film	(Age 11)
1985	Computer Chip	Writer, director and actor	Short film	(Age 11)
1987	Rampage	Writer, director and actor	Short film	(Age 11)
1989	Games	Writer, director and actor	Stage	
1992	Anthony's Apocalypse	Writer, director and actor	SHORT	(Short film 20 MIN)
1993	Inside Anthony's World	Writer, director and actor	SHORT	(Short film 22 MIN)
1994	Love Me Tender, Pay Me Well	Writer, director and actor	Short film	(Short film 30 MIN)
1995	When Yer 22	Writer, director and actor	Short film	(60 MIN)
1995	Hold My Hand & Tell Me I'm Not Insane	Writer and director	Play	
1997	Hey Baby, Do Ya Wanna Come Back to My Place & Justify My Existence	Writer, director and actor	Play	
1998	BRAIN ACHES & THE QUEST FOR REDEMPTION OF A TELEPHONE PSYCHIC	Writer, director and actor	Play	
1999	The Girls of Bipolar Disorder	WRITER / DIRECTOR	Short film	
1999	Punko	TOUGH SKINS	WRITER / DIRECTOR	Music video
1999	THE PINEHUST KIDS - ONCELER	WRITER / DIRECTOR		
1999	PUNKO	THE DAY BOB WENT ELECTRIC	PERFORMER / WRITER	ALBUM
1999	PUNKO	THE DAY BOB WENT ELECTRIC	PERFORMER / WRITER	Stage / MULTIMEDIA SHOW
2000	THE HUMANITY EXPERIMENT	WRITER / DIRECTOR	FEATURE FILM	
2000	THE STANDARD - UNNAMED	DIRECTOR	Music video	
2000	THE PINK SNOWFLAKES - GAS STATION IN THE SKY	DIRECTOR		
2002	PUNKO - WHY DON'T WE	WRITER / DIRECTOR PERFORMER	Music video	
2002	PUNKO -THE ANTHEMS	WRITER / PERFORMER	ALBUM	Example
2002	PUNKO	HOLY SON	WRITER / DIRECTOR / PERFORM	Music video
2003	HEAT WAVE	WRITER / DIRECTOR	Short film	45 minutes
2003	ANDREW SHERMAN VEHICLE - ROBOT VIDEO	WRITER / DIRECTOR	Music video	
2007	PARZANIA	WRITER / PRODUCER	FEATURE FILM	
2007	DOCUMENTARY - THE TREE OF LIFE	WRITER / EDITOR / ANIMATION	FEATURE FILM	
2007	THE LASHES - THERE GOES THE NEIGHBORHOOD	DIRECTOR	Music video	
2007	SIRENS SISTER - SHOULD'VE KNOWN	DIRECTOR	Music video	
2007	ROCKET - COUGAR RUSH	DIRECTOR	Music video	
2007	AARON MANINO	THE PRESENT MOMENT	DIRECTOR	Music video
2010	THE WEATHERED UNDERGROUND	Writer, director and actor / COMPOSER	FEATURE FILM	4 1/2-hour live action interactive break up saga inspired by the choose your own adventure books
2012	CHASING DEATH WITH A PENCHANT FOR THE PRIMITIVE SALVATION	Writer, director and actor	Play	Would later become basis for Feature Film - The Bang Bang Brokers
2012	MAR MAR - ICE CREAM	WRITER / DIRECTOR	Music video	
2012	RICK SHAFFER - ONE MORE HEART ACHE	WRITER/ DIRECTOR	Music video	
2014	MARC FORD - BLUE SKIES	WRITER / DIRECTOR / FX	Music video	
2014	THE BANG BANG BROKERS	Writer, director and actor	FEATURE FILM	
2014	THE PRINCIPAL - SHOCK TO THE SYSTEM	WRITER / DIRECTOR	Music video	
2014	BIPOLAR JUNCTION - DOPING	WRITER / DIRECTOR	Music video - Short film	
2014	SANDY	NORMAL LIFE	DIRECTOR	Music video
2014	SANDY	BREAKING HIM OUT	DIRECTOR	Music video
2014	ALEXI	KINGSTON BLUE	DIRECTOR	Music video
2015	KRYSTA YOUNGS - XANAX: A LOVE SONG	WRITER / DIRECTOR	Music video - Short film	
2015	THOMAS GOLD, HARRISON & HIIO - TAKE ME HOME	WRITER / DIRECTOR	Music video - Short film	
2015	JOHN DAHLBACK - RAVEN		WRITER / DIRECTOR	Music video - Short film
2015	NIGHT SAFARI - DAYLIGHT TO MIDNIGHT	WRITER / DIRECTOR	Music video - Short film	
2015	HOLD ON	WRITER / DIRECTOR	Music video - Short film	
2015	JOHN DAHLBACK - ATLANTIS	WRITER / DIRECTOR	Music video - Short film	
2015	ELEPHANTE ft RUMORS - I WANT YOU	WRITER / DIRECTOR	Music video - Short film	
2015	MARK SIXMA & ANDREW RAYEL - CHASED		WRITER / DIRECTOR	Mini-movie
2016	RUSLAN SIROTA - A LIFETIME AWAY		WRITER / DIRECTOR	Mini-movie
2016	BLASTERJAXX AND BREATHE CAROLINA - SOLDIER		WRITER / DIRECTOR	Mini-movie
2016	BOBBY PUMA - DEEPER THAN LOVE		WRITER / DIRECTOR	Mini-movie
2016	KO:YU - DON'T WAIT		WRITER / DIRECTOR	Mini-movie
2016	RICK SHAFFER - GOIMNG DOWN SLOW		WRITER / DIRECTOR	Mini-movie
2015	ELEPHANTE ft RUMORS - I WANT YOU	WRITER / DIRECTOR	Music video - Short film	
2016	KONIH - GIMME SOME MORE		WRITER / DIRECTOR	Mini-movie
2017	KSI - "Transforming"	Director	Music video	Short film

== Personal life ==
Donihue lives in Los Angeles, California. He continues to direct a large number of music videos and short form media.
