= List of Bengali songs recorded by Shreya Ghoshal =

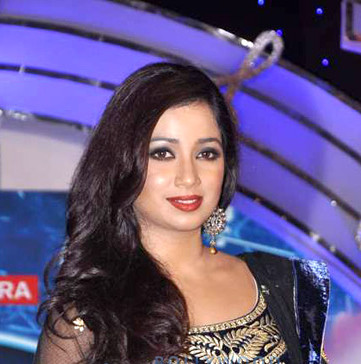
Shreya Ghoshal on the set of Indian Idol Junior

Shreya Ghoshal (born 12 March 1984) is an Indian playback singer. She sings in Hindi, Telugu, Bengali, Tamil, Malayalam, Kannada, Marathi, Gujarati, Assamese, Nepali, Oriya, Bhojpuri, Punjabi, Urdu and Tulu languages.

She began her Bengali singing career for films in 2003, she sang for films such as Champion and Mayer Anchal. She received the Anandalok Award for Best Female Playback Singer and ETV Bangla Film Award for Best Female Playback Singer in 2005 for her Manik. She was also honoured with the Bengal Film Journalists' Association – Best Female Playback Award for Shubhodrishti. She sang 328 Songs in Bengali. She won a National Film Award for the song "Pherari Mon" from the film Antaheen.

== Film songs ==
She has sung 256 film songs in Bengali.

=== 2003 ===
Film	No	Song	Composer(s)	Writer(s)	Co-artist(s)
Guru	1	"Olite Golite"	Babul Bose	N/A	Shaan
Kartabya	2	"Ei Mon Amar Dhana"	Ashok Bhadra	Gautam Susmit	
Mayer Anchal	3	"Lojja Kore"	Ashok Bhadra		Babul Supriyo

=== 2004 ===
Film	No	Song	Composer(s)	Writer(s)	Co-artist(s)
Bandhan	4	"Je Kothati Mone"	Jeet Gannguli	Gautam Susmit	Sonu Nigam
Bandhan	5	"Bosey Bosey Bhabi"	Jeet Gannguli	Gautam Susmit	Raghab Chatterjee
Dadu No. 1	6	"Oi Chokhete"	Malay Ganguly	—N/a	Babul Supriyo
Dadu No. 1	7	"Aj Aei Shubhodine"	Malay Ganguly	—N/a	Udit Narayan, Babul Supriyo
Paribar	8	"Buk Fate Tobu Keno"	Ashok Bhadra	—N/a	Babul Supriyo
Premi	9	"Prothom Premer Prothom Choya"	Jeet Gannguli	Goutam Susmit	Shaan
Premi	10	"Shotti Shotti Jodi Pori Hoye"	Jeet Gannguli	Goutam Susmit	
Premi	11	"Mone Rekho Amar Ei Gaan (Duet Version)"	Jeet Gannguli	Goutam Susmit	Sonu Nigam
Premi	12	Mone Rekho Amar E Gaan (Female Version)	Jeet Gannguli	Goutam Susmit	
Shudhu Tumi	13	"Gun Gun Gun Gunjare, Antare"	Zubeen Garg	—N/a	Sagarika
Shudhu Tumi	14	"Ektuku Chhoan Lage"	Zubeen Garg	—N/a	Babul Supriyo
Akritagya	15	"Mone Mone Atodin"	Emon Saha	Gautam Susmit	Shaan
Akrosh	16	"Ki Kore Je Banchi Chokhe Shrawan Niye"	Prashanta Nanda	Priyo Chatterjee	
Mastan	17	"Tor Hasite Ami Hasi"			
Parinaam	18	"Aajke Sobar Ghumer Chhuti"	Babul Bose		Kumar Sanu
Parinaam	19	"Raaj Prasade Rajar Kumar"	Babul Bose		Kumar Sanu
Parinaam		"Path Bhola Ek Pathik"			Kumar Sanu
Agni	20	"Bhalobasi Tomay Seki Bola Jay"	Ashok Bhadra		
Barood	21	"Premer Rasta Dhore"	Arvinder Singh		Udit Narayan
Ram Laxman	22	"Kauke Laage Na Bhalo Tomake Dekhar Por"	Babul Bose		Udit Narayan
Ram Laxman	23	"Tik Tik Ghorir Sathe"	Babul Bose		Udit Narayan
Badsha The King	24	"Tomar Chhoyay Ato Agun"			Kumar Sanu
Surya	25	"Amar Boyos Holo Solo"	Babul Bose		
Coolie	26	"Green Signal Ami Peye Gechhi"	Ashok Bhadra		Kumar Sanu
Coolie	27	"Prem Korar Manush"	Ashok Bhadra		Shaan
Coolie	28	"Mon Baro Obujh Mon"	Ashok Bhadra		
Coolie	29	"Green Signal Ami Peye Gechhi"(Version ll)	Ashok Bhadra		Kumar Sanu
Garakal	30	"Moner Kotha Khule Boli"	Babul Bose		Udit Narayan
Garakal	31	"Tomai Kato Bhalo Bashi Go"	Babul Bose		Shaan, Babul Supriyo
Tyaag	32	"A Shubho Diner"	Ashok Bhadra		Kumar Sanu
Til Theke Taal	33	"Jibon Sagore (Female Version)"	V Balsara	Ranjeet Dey	
Til Theke Taal	34	"Kaan Pete Sono"	V Balsara	Ranjeet Dey	Kumar Sanu
Kolkaatar Item	35	"Kolkataar Item"	Sayed Ahmed	Sayed Ahmed	
Kolkaatar Item	36	"Ja Re Ja Pakhi"	Sayed Ahmed	Sayed Ahmed	
Raja Babu	37	"Anchan Anchan Kore"	Ashok Bhadra	Gautam Sushmit	
Swapne Dekha Rajkanya	38	"Swapne Dekhchi Jare"	Babul Bose	Dhrubjyoti Mondol	Udit Narayan
Deshdrohi (2004)	39	"Tumi Amar Boom Boom"	Bappi Lahiri	Gautam Sushmit	Kumar Sanu
Samudra Saakshi	40	"Jiboner Aynate Amar Amike"	Nachiketa Chackraborty		

=== 2005 ===
Film	No	Song	Composer(s)	Writer(s)	Co-artist(s)
Abiswasi	41	"Tolo Tolo Mukhti"			Babul Supriyo
Abiswasi	42	"Ekti Gaaner"			Babul Supriyo
Bazi	43	"Jodi Ami Tomake"	Ashok Bhadra		Udit Narayan
Agnipath	44	"Mon Diye Mon Niye"	Indrajit		Kumar Sanu
Agnipath	45	"Aapon Maanus Aaj"	Indrajit		Indrajit
Dadar Adesh	46	"Jani Na Kothay Tumi"	Mohammed Aziz, Priya Bhattacharya		
Dadar Adesh	47	"Prem Korechhe Minya Bibi"	Mohammed Aziz, Priya Bhattacharya		Babul Supriyo
Dadar Adesh	48	"Janame Janame"	Mohammed Aziz, Priya Bhattacharya		Mohammed Aziz, Priya Bhattacharya
Dadar Adesh	49	"Prem Jibaner Asha"	Mohammed Aziz, Priya Bhattacharya		Shaan
Dada	50	"Dhire Dhire Kache Asa"	Babul Bose		Kumar Sanu
Dada	51	"Proman Karo Krisna Tumi"	Babul Bose		Kumar Sanu
Debi	52	"Joy Kali Joy Maa Kali"	Ashok Bhadra		
Manik	53	"Jhumur Jhumur Nupur"	Babul Bose		
Manik	54	"Kauke Bhalo Lage"	Babul Bose		Babul Supriyo
Manik	55	"Tomake Peye Chena Prithibi"	Babul Bose		Babul Supriyo
Manik	56	"Ke Dekheche Aage"	Babul Bose		Babul Supriyo
Shubhodrishti	57	"Sankha Baja Tora"	Jeet Gannguli		Babul Supriyo
Shubhodrishti	58	"Pagaley Ki Na Baley"	Jeet Gannguli		Babul Supriyo
Shubhodrishti	59	"Mon Rage Anurage"	Jeet Gannguli		Sonu Nigam
Shubhodrishti	60	"Sona Roder Hanshi Dekhe"	Jeet Gannguli		
Shubhodrishti	61	"Tumi Amar Chiro Sathi"	Jeet Gannguli		
Shubhodrishti	62	"Gaye Halud"	Jeet Gannguli		
Sangram	63	"Aamar Ei Chokh Diye"	Ashok Bhadra		Babul Supriyo
Yuddho	64	"Baisakhete Prothom Dekha"	Jeet Gannguli		Sonu Nigam
Yuddho	65	"Kichu Asha Khonje Bhasa"	Jeet Gannguli		Sonu Nigam
Yuddho	66	"Sure Sure Aaj O Mon"	Jeet Gannguli		Sonu Nigam, Babul Supriyo, Sadhana Sargam
Raju Uncle	67	"Ektu Chena Ekti Jana"	Ashok Raj		Roop Kumar Rathod
Raju Uncle	68	Mon Mane Na	Ashok Raj		Shaan
Unknown	69	Sagor Nodi Jemon Kore Mohonay Meshe	Babul Bose		Babul Supriyo
Devdoot	70	Sobai Mile Hoichoi	Babul Bose		Babul Supriyo, Sadhana Sargam
Devdoot	71	Jato Swapno Ache Ei	Babul Bose		Udit Narayan
Devdoot	72	"Tomake Tomar Theke"	Babul Bose		Udit Narayan
Mayer Raja	73	"Keno Aaj Ami Sathihara"	Sunil Majumdar		Kumar Sanu
Chore Chore Mastuto Bhai	74	Na Na Na	Ashok Bhadra		
Tobu Bhalobasi	75	"Jao Chole Jao Bondhu Amar (Sad)"	Snehasish Chakroborty		
Tobu Bhalobasi	76	"Shudhu Bhalobasa"	Snehasish Chakroborty		
Tobu Bhalobasi	77	"Khola Khola Hawate"	Snehasish Chakroborty		Udit Narayan
Tobu Bhalobasi	78	"Shudhu Bhalobasai (Duet)"	Snehasish Chakroborty		Shaan
Rajmahal	79	"Ekhane Shudhu Aami"	Ashok Bhadra		Udit Narayan
Tomake Selam	80	"Ghum Bhanga Chokhe Dekhi Notun E Alo (Female)"			Solo

=== 2006 ===
Film	No	Song	Composer(s)	Writer(s)	Co-artist(s)
Hero	81	"Bhalolage Sapnoke"	Jeet Gannguli	Priyo Chattopadhyay, Goutam Susmit	Sonu Nigam
Hero	82	"Jibon Prothom Ayto Kachete"	Jeet Gannguli	Priyo Chattopadhyay, Goutam Susmit	Shaan
Hero	83	"Mon Jaake Khonje (Humming Part)"	Jeet Gannguli	Priyo Chattopadhyay, Goutam Susmit	Shaan
Kranti	84	"Prithibi Bodle Gechhe"	Som Dasgupta, Rishi Chanda, Samidh Mukerjee	Gouri Prasanna Majumdar	Saptak Bhattacharjee
Kranti	85	"Prithibi" (DJ Mix)	Som Dasgupta, Rishi Chanda, Samidh Mukerjee	Gouri Prasanna Majumdar	Saptak Bhattacharjee
Eri Naam Prem	86	"Bhalobashar Ei Jibon"	Jeet Gannguli	Priyo Chattopadhyay	Soham Chakraborty
Eri Naam Prem	87	"Tomake Kotha Dilam"	Jeet Gannguli	Priyo Chattopadhyay	Babul Supriyo
Priyotama	88	"Tomake Chai"	Jeet Gannguli	Priyo Chattopadhyay	Babul Supriyo
Shikar	89	"Du Chokhe Oi Aalto Hasi"	Ashok Bhadra	Saron Dutta	Babul Supriyo
Ekai Eksho	90	"Dhak Bajao"	Bappi Lahiri		Babul Supriyo
Ghatak	91	"Alo Ashar Alo"	Jeet Gannguli	Gautam Sushmit	Babul Supriyo
Saathi Hara	92	"Moner Kotha Jodi Mukhei Na Bolte Paro"	Babul Bose		Udit Narayan
Saathi Hara	93	"Ghuum Ghuum Ratey"	Babul Bose		
Kuasha	94	"Khuje Berai Ami Je Taake"	Babul Bose		Soumitra Kundu
Kuasha	95	"Maajh Raate Brishti Pore"	Babul Bose		Kumar Sanu
Kuasha	96	"Sinthir Sindur"	Babul Bose		Kumar Sanu
Nayak The Real Hero	97	"Dheere Dheere Kachhe Asha"	Jeet Gannguli		Babul Supriyo
Nayak The Real Hero	98	"Bhalobasa Jay Chhuye (Humming)"	Jeet Gannguli		Shaan
Nayak The Real Hero	99	"Jakhon Jibon Hase"	Jeet Gannguli		Babul Supriyo
Nayak The Real Hero	100	"Jhilmil Swapner Brishti Te"	Jeet Gannguli		
Nayak The Real Hero	101	"Sobar Jibone Aashe Ei Shubho Din"	Jeet Gannguli		Sonu Nigam
Criminal	102	"Bhalobasa Chirodini "			Kumar Sanu
Criminal	103	"Eto Bhalo Keu Ajo Baseni Amai"			Udit Narayan
Abhimanyu	104	"Keu Bole Pahari Phool"	Ashok Bhadra		Abhijeet Bhattacharya
Agnishapath	105	Februarir Saat Tarikh			Shaan
Mayer Morjada	106	"Mone Mone Etodin Jaar Kotha"	Emon Saha	Gautam Sushmit	Shaan

=== 2007 ===
Film	No	Song	Composer(s)	Writer(s)	Co-artist(s)
Bandhu	107	"Jhinuk Jhinuk Mukto Ache"	Prashanta Nanda, Shanti Raj		Shaan
Bandhu	108	Katha Diye Chhile Tumi	Prashanta Nanda, Shanti Raj		Shaan
I Love You	109	"I Love You"	Jeet Gannguli		Shaan
I Love You	110	"Bhalobasha Haat Baralo"	Jeet Gannguli		Shaan
I Love You	111	"Dure Oi Pahar Mishechhe"	Jeet Gannguli		Babul Supriyo, Shweta
I Love You	112	"Ekta Katha Bolbo"	Jeet Gannguli		Babul Supriyo
Jiban Sathi	113	"Bhabini Jibone Aamar" (Duet Version)	Ashok Bhadra		Babul Supriyo
Sangharsha	114	"Kichu Kotha Jayena Bola"	Malay Ganguly		Shaan
Lal Kalo	115	"Jhilmil Jhilmil Tara"	Jeet Gannguli	Chndrani Gannguli	Shaan
The Bong Connection	116	"Pagla Hawar Badol Dine"	Neel Dutt	Rabindranath Tagore	Nachiketa Chakraborty
Bidhatar Lekha	117	"Cholechi Pathe Jana Ajana"	Lalit Pandit		Abhijeet Bhattacharya

=== 2008 ===
Film	No	Song	Composer(s)	Writer(s)	Co-artist(s)
Tomar Jonyo	118	"Ankhi Amar Abchha"	Jolly Mukherjee		Aneek Dhar
Tomar Jonyo	119	"Dite Chai Tomay" (Female Version)	Jolly Mukherjee		
Tomar Jonyo	120	"Tomar Jonyo"	Jolly Mukherjee		Shaan
Premer Kahini	121	"Rimjhim Ei Dharate" (Duet Version)	Jeet Gannguli		Shaan
Premer Kahini	122	"Sangsar Sukhi Hoy"	Jeet Gannguli		Babul Supriyo
Premer Kahini	123	"Sanai Baje"	Jeet Gannguli		
Premer Kahini	124	"Premer Kahini" (Female Version)	Jeet Gannguli		
Premer Kahini	125	"Tumi Chara"	Jeet Gannguli		Shaan
Sedin Dujone	126	"Samayer Mombati"	Chandan Raychowdhury		Shaan
Cheetah	127	"Moner Kotha Royna Je Aar Gopone"	Babul Bose	N/A	Udit Narayan
Mon Mane Na	128	"Chupi Chupi Bhalobasha"	Jeet Gannguli		Shaan
Mon Mane Na	129	"Chokhe Chokhe Eto Katha"	Jeet Gannguli		Shaan

=== 2009 ===
Film	No	Song	Composer(s)	Writer(s)	Co-artist(s)
Antaheen	130	"Jao Pakhi"	Shantanu Moitra	Anindya Chatterjee, Chandril Bhattacharya	Pranab Biswas
Antaheen	131	"Shokal Ashe Na"	Shantanu Moitra	Anindya Chatterjee, Chandril Bhattacharya	
Antaheen	132	"Pherari Mon"	Shantanu Moitra	Anindya Chatterjee, Chandril Bhattacharya	Babul Supriyo
Jackpot	133	"Ari Ari"	Jeet Gannguli	Kaushik Ganguly	
Brake Fail	134	"Jadi Prashna Karo"	Neel Dutt	Kaushik Ganguly	Shaan
Brake Fail	135	"Shorey Shorey Jay"	Neel Dutt	Kaushik Ganguly	Shaan
Amar Pratigya	136	Tomake Sobar Theke Ami Chhiniye Nite Eshechhi			

=== 2010 ===
Film	No	Song	Composer(s)	Writer(s)	Co-artist(s)
Jodi Ekdin	137	"Aaj Roddur Sikhchhe Tomar Amar Hasi"	Joy Sarkar	Anindya Chatterjee, Chandril Bhattacharya	Arnab Chakraborty
Jodi Ekdin	138	"Chol Phul Jharabi Chol (Ofur Belay Tumi Kothay)"	Joy Sarkar	Anindya Chatterjee, Chandril Bhattacharya	Soumitra Ray
Jodi Ekdin	139	"Khola Chithi"	Joy Sarkar	Anindya Chatterjee, Chandril Bhattacharya	
Amanush	140	"O My Love"	Jeet Gannguli	Priyo Chattopadhyay, Goutam Susmit	Kunal Ganjawala
Le Chakka	141	"Ali Maula"	Indraadip Das Gupta	Srijit Mukherji	Shaan, Shadab Hussain
Ekti Tarar Khonje	142	"Pagol Mon Re" (Duet Version)	Prabuddha Banerjee	Anindya Chatterjee, Chandril Bhattacharya	Shaan
Ekti Tarar Khonje	143	"Pagol Mon Re" (Female Version)	Prabuddha Banerjee	Anindya Chatterjee, Chandril Bhattacharya	
Target	144	"Sa Ni Pa Ni Ni"	Jeet Gannguli	Raja Chanda	Shaan
Aarohan	145	"Dil Ko Churake"	Suparna Kanti Ghosh	Haraprasad Mondal	
Ogo Badhu Sundari	146	"Ogo Badhu Sundari"	Bappi Lahiri	Sanjoy Bose	Babul Supriyo
Prem By Chance	147	"Uri Uri Mon Ghuri"	Rupankar Bagchi	Saki	Shaan
Autograph	148	"Chawl Raastaye" (Female Version)	Debojyoti Mishra	Srijato	
Autograph	149	"Uthche Jege Shawkalgulo"	Debojyoti Mishra	Srijit Mukherji	
Natobar Not Out	150	"Megher Palok"	Debojyoti Mishra	Kamaleshwar Mukherjee	
Mon Je Kore Uru Uru	151	"O Mon Pakhi"	Jeet Gannguli	Prasen	Soham Chakraborty, Rana Mazumder
Kellafate	152	"You Are My Love"	Jeet Gannguli	Prasen	
Bejanma	153	"Piriter Eto Jala Re"	Bappi Lahiri	Lipi	Bappi Lahiri
Thana Theke Aschi	154	"Bajai Bashi" (Female Version)	Jeet Gannguli	Saran Dutta (Additional verses written by Rabindranath Tagore)	
Hangover	155	"Hariye Jai"	Bappi Lahiri	Priyo Chattopadhyay	Babul Supriyo

=== 2011 ===
Film	No	Song	Composer(s)	Writer(s)	Co-artist(s)
Jaani Dyakha Hawbe	156	"Jaani Dekha Hobe" (Female Version)	Roshan (Recreated by Indraadip Das Gupta)	Sahir Ludhianvi (Additional lyrics by Srijato)	
Uro Chithi	157	"Sohor Ballad" (Female Version)	Kamaleshwar Mukherjee		
Uro Chithi	158	"Saradin" (Duet Version)	Kamaleshwar Mukherjee	Samantak Sinha	
Baishe Srabon	159	"Gobheere Jaao" (Female Version)	Anupam Roy	Anupam Roy	
Baishe Srabon	160	"Je Kota Din" (Duet Version)	Anupam Roy	Anupam Roy	Saptarshi Mukherjee
Romeo	161	"Ghoom Ghoom Oi Chokhe"	Jeet Gannguli	Chandrani Gannguli	Sonu Nigam
Punorutthan	162	"Ki Jani Ki Je Holo" (Version 1)	Ravindra Jain	Chiranjit Basu	Shaan
Bhorer Alo	163	"Jhiri Jhiri"	Jeet Gannguli	Priyo Chattopadhyay	Nachiketa Chakraborty
Iti Mrinalini	164	"Ajana Kono Galpo Bole"	Debojyoti Mishra	Srijit Mukherji	
Iti Mrinalini	165	"Bishe Bishe Nil" (Female Version)	Debojyoti Mishra	Srijit Mukherji	

=== 2012 ===
Film	No	Song	Composer(s)	Writer(s)	Co-artist(s)
Bedroom	166	"Aarekta Din Kete Jay"	Rupam Islam	Rupam Islam	
Macho Mustanaa	167	"O Jaane Jaana"	Samidh Mukerjee	Priyo Chattopadhyay	Kunal Ganjawala
Le Halua Le	168	"Chupi Chupi Chupi"	Jeet Gannguli	Raja Chanda	Mohit Chauhan
Haatchhani	169	"Opaare Maya Chhaya Ghera"	Dilip Das	Pabak Ghosh	Raghab Chatterjee
Hemlock Society	170	"Ei To Ami Chai"	Anupam Roy	Anupam Roy	Anupam Roy
Paglu 2	171	"Love U Love U O My Paglu"	Jeet Gannguli	Priyo Chattopadhyay	Mika Singh
Paglu 2	172	"Khuda Jane"	Jeet Gannguli	Prasen	Zubeen Garg, Shyam Bhatt
Paglu 2	173	"Love U Love U O My Paglu" (Remix Version)	Jeet Gannguli	Priyo Chattopadhyay	Mika Singh
Ekla Akash	174	"Ekla Akash" (Female Version)	Jeet Gannguli	Sandipan Roy	
Challenge 2	175	"Elo Je Maa"	Jeet Gannguli	Priyo Chattopadhyay, Raja Chanda	Abhijeet Bhattacharya
Paanch Adhyay	176	"Baavri"	Shantanu Moitra	Anindya Chatterjee, Chandril Bhattacharya	
Paanch Adhyay	177	"Agantuk"	Shantanu Moitra	Anindya Chatterjee, Chandril Bhattacharya	Shaan
Paanch Adhyay	178	"Rahoon Tere Peechhe" (Version 2)	Shantanu Moitra	Swanand Kirkire	
3 Kanya	179	"Kono Ek Din"	Indraadip Das Gupta	Srijato	
3 Kanya	180	"Yaad Piya Ki Aye"	Indraadip Das Gupta	Srijato	Ustad Rashid Khan
Aparajita Tumi	181	"Brishti Biday"	Shantanu Moitra	Anindya Chatterjee, Chandril Bhattacharya	
Aparajita Tumi	182	"Take Me Home"	Shantanu Moitra	Anindya Chatterjee, Chandril Bhattacharya	Bonnie Chakraborty
Aparajita Tumi	183	"Roopkathara" (Female Version)	Shantanu Moitra	Anindya Chatterjee, Chandril Bhattacharya	

=== 2013 ===
Film	No	Song	Composer(s)	Writer(s)	Co-artist(s)
Namte Namte	184	"Ghor Neshar Prohor"	Sidhu	Srijato, Sidhu, Mir	
Proloy	185	"Haath Dhoreche Gaacher Paata"	Indraadip Das Gupta	Srijato	
Mishawr Rawhoshyo	186	"Keno Aaj Aakash Batash"	Indraadip Das Gupta	Srijato	
Mishawr Rawhoshyo	187	"Balir Shohor"	Indraadip Das Gupta	Srijato	Arijit Singh

=== 2014 ===
Film	No	Song	Composer(s)	Writer(s)	Co-artist(s)
Buno Haansh	188	"Esheche Raat"	Shantanu Moitra	Srijato	Papon
Buno Haansh	189	"Bela Boye Jae"	Shantanu Moitra	Anindya Chatterjee, Chandril Bhattacharya	Anindya Chatterjee
Kkoli: A Journey of Love	190	"Jodi Chaao"	Meet Bros	Rana Mazumder	Shaan

=== 2015 ===
Film	No	Song	Composer(s)	Writer(s)	Co-artist(s)
Herogiri	191	"Panga"	Jeet Gannguli	Raja Chanda	Mika Singh
Teenkahon	192	"Chokh"	Arnab Chakraborty	Bauddhayan Mukherji	
Jogajog	193	"Mere To Giridhar Gopal"	Pandit Debojyoti Bose	Meera	
Besh Korechi Prem Korechi	194	"Oi Tor Mayabi Chokh"	Jeet Gannguli	Prasen	Jeet Gannguli
Katmundu	195	"Eto Alo"	Anupam Roy	Anupam Roy	
Shudhu Tomari Jonyo	196	"Shudhu Tomari Jonyo" (Title Track)	Indraadip Das Gupta	Prasen	Arijit Singh

=== 2016 ===
Film	No	Song	Composer(s)	Writer(s)	Co-artist(s)
Bastu-Shaap	197	"Tomake Chhuye Dilam"(Female Version)	Indraadip Das Gupta	Srijato	
Bastu-Shaap	198	"Raja Ranir Bhalo Hok"	Indraadip Das Gupta	Srijato	
Sangabora	199	"Tobe Chole Aai"	Raja Narayan Deb	Prasen	Javed Ali
Praktan	200	"Kolkata"	Anupam Roy	Anupam Roy	Anupam Roy
Shaheb Bibi Golaam	201	"Tomar Ki Naam"	Anupam Roy	Anupam Roy	
Tobu Aporichito	202	"Khub Chena Mukh"	Kumar Sanu	Goutam Susmit	
Love Express	203	"Majhe Majhe"	Jeet Gannguli	Prasen	Kumar Sanu
Potadar Kirtee	204	"Chaiche Mon Onno Chawa"	Bappa Lahiri	Goutam Susmit	
Zulfiqar	205	"Katakuti Khela"	Anupam Roy	Anupam Roy	Shaan

=== 2017 ===
Film	No	Song	Composer(s)	Writer(s)	Co-artist(s)
The Bongs Again	206	"Hridmajharey Rakhbo"	Neel Dutt	Rabindranath Tagore (Additional By Neel Dutt)	Shaan, Anjan Dutt
Loafer	207	"Ki Je Holo"	Bappi Lahiri	Lipi	Bappi Lahiri
Chaya O Chobi	208	"Ekla Ekla"	Indraadip Das Gupta	Kaushik Ganguly	
Samantaral	209	"Tui Chunli Jakhan"	Indraadip Das Gupta	Dipangshu	Arijit Singh

=== 2018 ===
Film	No	Song	Composer(s)	Writer(s)	Co-artist(s)
Ka Kha Ga Gha	210	"Naam Na Jana Pakhi" (Female Version)	Anindya Chatterjee	Anindya Chatterjee	
Ka Kha Ga Gha	211	"Naam Na Jana Pakhi" (Duet Version)	Anindya Chatterjee	Anindya Chatterjee	Arijit Singh
Ek Je Chhilo Raja	212	"Esho Hey"	Indraadip Das Gupta	Srijato	Ishan Mitra
Bagh Bandi Khela	213	"Kanya Re"	Jeet Gannguli	Ritam Sen	Sonu Nigam

=== 2019 ===
Film	No	Song	Composer(s)	Writer(s)	Co-artist(s)
Bibaho Obhijaan	214	"Michhrir Dana"	Jeet Gannguli	Srijato	Jeet Gannguli
Gotro	215	"Neel Digante"	Anindya Chatterjee	Anindya Chatterjee	
Gotro	216	"Baishnob Sei Jon"	Anindya Chatterjee	Anindya Chatterjee	
Parineeta	217	"Tomake" (Female)	Arko	Arko	

=== 2020 ===
Film	No	Song	Composer(s)	Writer(s)	Co-artist(s)
Dharmajuddha	218	"Tumi Jodi Chao"	Indraadip Dasgupta	Ritam Sen	Dev Arijit
Uraan	219	"Jege Jege"	Joy Sarkar	Srijato	
Uraan	220	"Bhanga Dana"	Joy Sarkar	Srijato	
Uraan	221	"O Kolkata"	Joy Sarkar	Srijato	
Uraan	222	"Nabo Anonde Jaago"	Joy Sarkar	Srijato	Srikanto Acharya

=== 2021 ===
Film	No	Song	Composer(s)	Writer(s)	Co-artist(s)
Tonic	223	"E Mon Eka"(Female)	Jeet Gannguli	Srijato	solo
Prem Tame	224	"Kachhe Thako"	Shantanu Moitra	Anindya Chattopadhyay	Papon
Prem Tame	225	"Prem Tame Title Track"	Shantanu Moitra	Anindya Chattopadhyay	
Ei Ami Renu	226	"Besh Toh"	Rana Mazumder	Rana Mazumder	
Ei Ami Renu	227	"Chol Choley Jaai"	Rana Mazumder	Rana Mazumder	Arijit Singh

=== 2022 ===
Film	No	Song	Composer(s)	Writer(s)	Co-artist(s)
X=Prem	228	"Bhalobashar Morshum" (Female)	Sanai	Barish	
X=Prem	229	"Bhalobashar Morshum" (Duet)	Sanai	Barish	Arijit Singh
Belashuru	230	"Ki Mayay"	Anupam Roy	Anupam Roy	
Bismillah	231	"Keno Jo Tomakey"	Indraadip Dasgupta	Indraadip Dasgupta	

=== 2023 ===
Film	No	Song	Composer(s)	Writer(s)	Co-artist(s)
Manobjomin	232	"Toka Dile Venge"	Joy Sarkar	Srijato	
Manobjomin	233	"Mon Re Krisikaj"	Ramprasad Sen	Ramprasad Sen	
Manobjomin	234	"Mon Re Krisika-duet"	Ramprasad Sen	Ramprasad Sen	Arijit singh
Dawshom Awbotaar	235	"Baundule Guri"	Anupam Roy	Anupam Roy	Arijit Singh
Mujib: The Making of a Nation	236	"Marsiya"	Shantanu Moitra	Sadhana Ahmed	
Manush: Child of Destiny	237	"Aay Bristi"	Aneek Dhar	Pranjal, Rivo	Abhay Jodhpurkar
Kurban	238	"Ek Anjhla Jyotsna"	Raja Narayan Deb	Saibal Mukherjee	
Pradhan	239	"Hoyechhe Boli Ki Shon"	Shantanu Moitra	Prosen	Papon

=== 2024 ===
Film	No	Song	Composer(s)	Writer(s)	Co-artist(s)
Alaap	240	"Sokhi Go"	Anupam Roy	Anupam Roy	
Ajogyo	241	"Tui Amar Hobi Na"	Ranajoy Bhattacharjee	Ranajoy Bhattacharjee	
Tahedar Katha	242	"Subarna Rekha"	Saptak Sanai Das	Dhrubojyoti Chakraborty	Kinjal Chatterjee
Babli	243	"Elomelo Raat"	Indraadip Dasgupta	Subrata Barishwala	
Babli	244	"MonPakhi"	Indraadip Dasgupta	Indraadip Dasgupta	
Bohurupi	245	"Aaj Shara Bela"	Anupam Roy	Anupam Roy	
Pushpa 2 (Dubbed)	246	"Aaguner" (The Couple Song)	Devi Sri Prasad	Srijato	

=== 2025 ===
Film	No	Song	Composer(s)	Writer(s)	Co-artist(s)
Binodiini: Ekti Natir Upakhyan	247	"Kanha"	Sourendro - Soumyojit	Ram Kamal Mukherjee	
Puratawn - The Ancient	248	"Dooray"	Alokananda Dasgupta	Rajeshwari Dasgupta Ghose	
Shreeman VS Shreemati	249	"Dao Ulu Dao"	Indraadip Dasgupta	Barish	Papon
Grihapravesh	250	"Bhalobashar Paaley"	Indraadip Dasgupta	Prasen	Debayan Banerjee
Grihapravesh	251	"Golpo Holo Shuru"	Indraadip Dasgupta	Prasen	Arijit Singh, Armaan Rashid Khan
Dhumketu	252	"Gaane Gaane"	Anupam Roy	Anupam Roy	Arijit Singh
Dhumketu	253	"Gaane Gaane reprise"	Anupam Roy	Anupam Roy	Anupam Roy
Ranna Baati	254	"Ranna Baati" (Title Track)	Ranajoy Bhattacharjee	Tamoghna Chatterjee	
Lawho Gouranger Naam Rey	255	"Lukochuri Khela"	Tamalika Golder	Tamalika Golder	

=== 2026 ===
Film	No	Song	Composer(s)	Writer(s)	Co-artist(s)
Keu Bole Biplobi, Keu Bole Dakat	256	"Naam Na Jaana"	Shantanu Moitra	Barish	
Winkle Twinkle	257	"Je Andhare"	Tamalika Golder	Tamalika Golder	
Emperor Vs Sarat Chandra	258	"Dil Ke Daag"	Srijit Mukherji	Srijato	

== Non-film songs ==
She sang 85 Non-Film Songs in Bengali .

=== 1998 ===
Album	Song	Composer(s)	Writer(s)	Co-artist(s)
Bendhechhi Beena (Note: All the tracks are cover versions of classic Bengali hits, which have been rearranged here by composer Amit Bandyopadhyay. The credits mentioned here refer to the composers and writers of the original songs, as listed in the audio CD.)	"Bendhechi Beena Gaan Shonabo"	R. D. Burman	Sapan Chakraborty	
Bendhechhi Beena	"Surero Ei Jhar Jhar Jharna"	Salil Chowdhury		
Bendhechhi Beena	"O Pakhi Ure Aay"	Abhijit Bandyopadhyay	Pulak Bandyopadhyay	
Bendhechhi Beena	"Ene De Ene De Jhumka"	Salil Chowdhury		
Bendhechhi Beena	"Jhum Jhum Jhum Raat Nijhum"	R. D. Burman	Sapan Chakraborty	
Bendhechhi Beena	"Saat Ranga Ek Pakhi"	Sudhin Dasgupta	Sunil Baran	
Bendhechhi Beena	"Jiban Gaan Gahe Ke Je"	Hridaynath Mangeshkar	Salil Chowdhury	
Bendhechhi Beena	"Dure Akash Shamianay"	Hridaynath Mangeshkar	Gouri Prasanna Majumdar	
Bendhechhi Beena	"Oli Amon Kore Noy"	Nachiketa Ghosh	Pulak Bandyopadhyay	
Bendhechhi Beena	"Akashe Aaj Ranger Khela"	Sudhin Dasgupta		
Bendhechhi Beena	"Kon Se Aalor Swapno Niye"	Sudhin Dasgupta		
Bendhechhi Beena	"Ni Sa Ga Ma Pa Ni"	Salil Chowdhury		
Bendhechhi Beena	"Akash Jure Swapno Maya"	Kanu Ghosh	Anal Chattopadhyay	
Bendhechhi Beena	"O Tota Pakhi Re"	Prabir Majumder		

=== 1999 ===
Album	Song	Composer(s)	Writer(s)	Co-singer(s)
Smaraniyo Jnara	"Ganga Jamuna Nirmol Pani"	Abhijit Bandyopadhyay	Bhaskar Basu	
Smaraniyo Jnara	"Sri Ramkrishna Paramhsnsa Deb"	Abhijit Bandyopadhyay	Bhaskar Basu	
Ekti Katha	"Mon Chai"	Laxmikant–Pyarelal	—N/a	
Ekti Katha	"Jibone Mor Hoyo Tumi Shathi"	Laxmikant–Pyarelal	—N/a	
Ekti Katha	"Esharae Mon Ki Bhore"	R. D. Burman	—N/a	
Ekti Katha	"Shob Asha Diye Nibhaye"	Madan Mohan	—N/a	
Ekti Katha	"Boli Boli Mon Chay"	O. P. Nayyar	—N/a	
Ekti Katha	"Ekti Katha"	R. D. Burman	—N/a	
Ekti Katha	"Kato Moru Path Jaye"	Madan Mohan	—N/a	
Ekti Katha	"O Phuler Dal Amai"	Salil Chowdhury	—N/a	
Ekti Katha	"Baloto Arshi Tumi Mukthi"	Abhijit Banerjee	—N/a	
Ekti Katha	"Gache Je Dur Chole"	O. P. Nayyar	—N/a	
Ekti Katha	"Projapoti Projapoti"	Salil Chowdhury	—N/a	
Ekti Katha	"Ei Chru Ke Eshe"	Ustad Sagiruddin Khan	—N/a	

=== 2000 ===
Album	Song	Composer(s)	Writer(s)	Co-singer(s)
Anyo Ganer Simanay	"Eso Notun Shatabdi"	Kazi Kamal Nasser		Sritama
Mukhor Porag	"Ami Akash Hote Jani"	Shreya Ghoshal	Atanu Chakraborty	
Mukhor Porag	"Harano Patheri Se Banke"	Shreya Ghoshal	Rupankar	
Mukhor Porag	"Je Sur Bajay"	Shreya Ghoshal	Subha Dasgupta	
Mukhor Porag	"Ke Abar Pichu Theke"	Shreya Ghoshal	Atanu Chakraborty	
Mukhor Porag	"Mayabano Biharini Ami Noi"	Shreya Ghoshal	Subha Dasgupta	
Mukhor Porag	"Tomar Anek Kathar"	Shreya Ghoshal	Rupankar	
Rupasi Raate	"Chhande Chhande Gaane Gaane"	R. D. Burman	Sapan Chakraborty	
Rupasi Raate	"Thuilaam Re Mon Padmapatai"	Nachiketa Ghosh	Mukul Dutt	
Rupasi Raate	"O Shyam Jakhan Takhan"	Sudhin Dasgupta	Pulak Bandyopadhyay	
Rupasi Raate	"Chokhe Naame Brishti"	R. D. Burman	Gauriprasanna Mazumder	
Rupasi Raate	"Ki Jeno Aaj Bhabchho Bosey"	Abhijit Banerjee	Probodh Ghosh	
Rupasi Raate	"Chholke Porey Kolke Phul"	Anal Chatterjee	Probodh Ghosh	
Rupasi Raate	"Mon Metechhe Mon Mauryi"	Sudhin Dasgupta		
Rupasi Raate	"Tomaai Aamay Pratham"	Nachiketa Ghosh	Pulak Bandyopadhyay	
Rupasi Raate	"Mitimiti Tarara"	Salil Chowdhury		
Rupasi Raate	"Ei Mom Jochhonai"	Nachiketa Ghosh	Gauriprasanna Mazumder	
Rupasi Raate	"Oi Akasha Klanti Nei"	Abhijit Banerjee	Amiya Dasgupta	
Rupasi Raate	"Balo Ki Achhe Go"	R. D. Burman	Sapan Chakraborty	

=== 2001 ===
Album	Song	Composer(s)	Writer(s)	Co-singer(s)
E Akash Tomari	"Banshi Ekhon Rangilaa"	Shreya Ghoshal	Arna Seal	
E Akash Tomari	"Bhalobasaar Katha"	Shreya Ghoshal	Arna Seal	
E Akash Tomari	"Brishti Thamar Ektu Paare"	Shreya Ghoshal	Sanjoy Banik	
E Akash Tomari	"Brishtite Dekho Naa"	Shreya Ghoshal	Rupankar	
E Akash Tomari	"E Aakash Tomari"	Shreya Ghoshal	Lilamoy Patra	
E Akash Tomari	"Jay Mon Jaak Naa Bhese"	Shreya Ghoshal	Sanjoy Banik	
E Akash Tomari	"Mon Jeno Aaj Koto"	Shreya Ghoshal	Sree Barun	
E Akash Tomari	"Oi Kaalo Meghe Raat Bristi"	Shreya Ghoshal	Dipanjan Saha	
E Akash Tomari	"Swapneri Gari Chutiye"	Shreya Ghoshal	Rupankar	

=== 2002 ===
Year	Album	Co-singer(s)	Notes
2002	Jabo Tepantar	Shreya Ghoshal	

=== 2012 ===
Album	Song	Composer(s)	Writer(s)	Co-singer(s)
Mon Kemoner Station	"Dyakho"	Joy Sarkar	Srijato	
Mon Kemoner Station	"Ja Khushi Saratadin"	Joy Sarkar	Srijato	
Mon Kemoner Station	"Bandhu Kotha Rakhis"	Joy Sarkar	Srijato	
Mon Kemoner Station	"Chithira Chhilo Elomelo"	Joy Sarkar	Srijato	
Mon Kemoner Station	"Chokhher Bali"	Joy Sarkar	Srijato	
Mon Kemoner Station	"Sandhye Naame"	Joy Sarkar	Srijato	
Mon Kemoner Station	"Aaj Benche Ne"	Joy Sarkar	Srijato	
Mon Kemoner Station	"Mon Kemoner Station"	Joy Sarkar	Srijato	
Suruchi Sangha Puja Anthem	"Fulche Sagor"	Jeet Gannguli	Chandrani Gannguli, Abhijeet Sen	Sonu Nigam

=== 2013 ===
Album	Song	Composer(s)	Writer(s)	Co-singer(s)
Suruchi Sangha Puja Anthem	"Bangla Amar Maa"	Jeet Gannguli	Chandrani Gannguli, Kazi Kamal Naser	Shaan, Jeet Gannguli

=== 2015 ===
Album	Song	Composer(s)	Writer(s)	Co-singer(s)
Suruchi Sangha Puja Anthem	"Maa Go Tumi Sarbojanin"	Jeet Gannguli	Mamata Banerjee	

=== 2016 ===
Album	Song	Composer(s)	Writer(s)	Co-singer(s)
Dhak Baja Kashor Baja	"Dhak Baja Kashor Baja"	Jeet Gannguli	Priyo Chattopadhyay	

=== 2017 ===
Album	Song	Composer(s)	Writer(s)	Co-singer(s)
Suruchi Sangha Puja Anthem	"Boichitrer Muktoy Gantha Ekotar Monihar"	Jeet Gannguli	Mamta Banerjee	

=== 2018 ===
Album	Song	Composer(s)	Lyricist(s)	Co-singer(s)
Zee Bangla Anthem	"Notun Chhondey Likhbo Jibon"	Shantanu Moitra	Srijato	
Ami Sirajer Begum	"Ami Sirajer Begum"	Indraadip Das Gupta	TBA	

=== 2019 ===
Album	Song	Composer(s)	Lyricist(s)	Co-singer(s)
Mahapith Tarapith	"Mahapith Tarapith"	Jeet Gannguli	TBA	
Suruchi Sangha Theme Song	"Utsav"	Jeet Gannguli	Mamata Banerjee	

=== 2020 ===
Album	Song	Composer(s)	Lyricist(s)	Co-singer(s)
Tarader Sesh Tarpon	"Tarader Sesh Tarpon" (Title Track)	Indradeep Dasgupta	Srijato	Rupankar Bagchi

=== 2024 ===
Album	Song	Composer(s)	Lyricist(s)	Co-singer(s)
Tumi Bondhu Aaj Shunbe	"Tumi Bondhu Aaj Shunbe"	Shantanu Moitra	Arna Seal	
Bhoomi 2024	"Ujaan"	Salim-Sulaiman	Srijato	

=== 2025 ===
Album	Song	Composer(s)	Lyricist(s)	Co-singer(s)
Waves of India Album	"Connecting Creators, Connecting Countries"	M. M. Keeravani	Nadaan, Vaish, Mukul Abhayankar, Saptaparna Chakraborty (Bengali Lyrics), M. M. Keeravani	Sonu Nigam (Hindi), Shankar Mahadevan, K. S. Chithra (Tamil), Mangli, Lipsika, Harini Ivaturi
