= Shreya Ghoshal discography =

List of songs recorded by Shreya Ghoshal
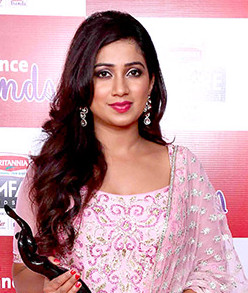
- Category: Songs
Hindi Songs	1160
Bengali Songs	338
Kannada Songs	315
Telugu Songs	284
Tamil Songs	219
Malayalam Songs	112
Bhojpuri Songs	81
Marathi Songs	74
Punjabi Songs	29
Urdu Songs	16
English Songs	9
Assamese Songs	6
Nepali Songs	5
Gujarati Songs	5
French Songs	2
Tulu Songs	1
Angika Songs	1
Odia Songs	1
Total Songs	3000 +

Shreya Ghoshal is an Indian singer who has established herself as a leading playback singer of Indian cinema. She is highly regarded as one of the most successful singers of all time, having won seven Filmfare Awards, ten Filmfare Awards South, five National Film Awards and four Kerala State Film Awards. She has established herself as one of the leading singers in Hindi, Bengali, Tamil, Telugu, Kannada, Malayalam, Marathi, Punjabi and Bhojpuri languages.

== Studio albums ==
List of studio albums
Title	Album details	Ref.	Title	Album details	Ref.
Bendhechhi Beena	Released: January 1, 1998; Label: Sagarika Music; Language: Bengali; Composer(s): R. D. Burman, Salil Chowdhury, Abhijit Bandyopadhyay, Sudhin Dasgupta, Hridaynath Mangeshkar, Nachiketa Ghosh, Kanu Ghosh, Prabir Majumder; Writer(s): Sapan Chakraborty, Salil Chowdhury, Pulak Bandyopadhyay, Sunil Baran, Gouri Prasanna Majumdar, Sudhin Dasgupta, Anal Chattopadhyay, Prabir Majumder; Formats: CD, digital download		Ekti Katha	Released: January 1, 1999; Label: Sagarika Music; Language: Bengali; Composer(s): Laxmikant–Pyarelal, R. D. Burman, Madan Mohan, O. P. Nayyar, Salil Chowdhury, Abhijit Bandyopadhyay, Ustad Sagiruddin Khan; Writer(s): Atanu Chakraborty, Gouri Prasanna Majumdar, Salil Chowdhury, Bhaskar Basu, Subir Hazra; Formats: CD, Digital download	

Year	Title	Album details	Track listing
2000	Mukhor Porag	Digital Release Date: 1 January 2000: Label: Sagarika	
2001	Rupasi Raate	Digital Release Date: 1 September 2001: Label: Sagarika	
2002	Banomali Re	Digital Release Date: 1 January 2002: Label: Sagarika	
2002	Akasher Mukhomukhi	Digital Release Date: 1 January 2002: Label: Sagarika	
2003	Bojalije Pepati	CD & Cassette Release Date: 26 February 2003; Digital Release Date: 1 March 2003: Co-artists: Zubeen Garg; Sonu Nigam; Mahalakshmi Iyer; Sunidhi Chauhan; Label: S.P. Saini & Sons	
2003	Jaabo Tepantar	Digital Release Date: 1 January 2003: Label: Sagarika	
2003	Swapner Pakha	Digital Release Date: 1 May 2003: Label: Sagarika	1. "Aaj Keno O Chokhe Laaj" (3:13); 2. "Aaynate Mukh Dekhbo Na" (3:31); 3. "Amar Swapno Dekhar Duti" (3:42); 4. "Andhar Amar Bhalo Lage" (2:51); 5. "Ektu Chaowa Ektu Paowa" (3:54); 6. "Gungun Fagun Sesh Hole" (3:47); 7. "Jete Dao Amay" (3:19); 8. "Lage Dol Patay Patay" (3:11); 9. "Madhumalati Dake Aay" (3:15); 10. "Nodir Jemon Jharna Ache" (3:47); 11. "Phoole Gandha Nei" (3:13); 12. "Sagar Dake Aay" (3:47)
2006	Thikana	Digital Release Date: 1 January 2006: Label: Sagarika	1. "Hariyeche Meghe" (4:46); 2. "Kichu Bola Chhilo" (3:51); 3. "Tumi Amari" (4:12); 4. "Thikana" (4:05); 5. "Fire Dekha" (4:07); 6. "Brishti" (3:38); 7. "Ei Gaan" (4:11); 8. "Mone Pore" (4:23)
2006	Meghor Aare Aare	CD Release Date: 27 August 2006; Cassette Release Date: 1 September 2006: Co-artists: Kunal Ganjawala; Hemachandra Vedla; Mahalakshmi Iyer; Taranum; Label: Regional Music Centre	1. "Suwali Duniya"; 2. "Jetuki Ture Naam"; 3. "Meghor Aare Aare"; 4. "Dorodi Dorodi"; 5. "Uki Mari Mari"; 6. "Lahe Lahe Aaha"; 7. "Jilika Jilika"; 8. "Rati Rati"
2006	Ustad & the Divas	Digital Release Date: 24 November 2006: Label: YBR Records, T-Series	
2007	Krishna Bina Ache Ke	Digital Release Date: 1 January 2007: Label: Sagarika	1. "Rekhechi Rakhalraja Naam" (3:57); 2. "Manomohan Ache Manoharane" (4:04); 3. "Mohini Radha Saje" (5:47); 4. "Re Amar Nandadulal" (3:28); 5. "Angete Anga Bibhor" (4:51); 6. "Ore Mon Ekbar Balo Re" (4:36); 7. "Kare Bhabo He" (4:33); 8. "Purushottam Jagate" (3:50)
2007	Kanadau Vitthalu	Digital Release Date: 1 July 2007: Label: Sagarika	1. "Om Namojee Adya" (4:13); 2. "Kanadau Vitthalu" (4:55); 3. "Run Zhun Run Zhun" (3:31); 4. "Sundar Te Dhyan" (4:32); 5. "Ranga Yei Vo" (4:07); 6. "Vishwache Aart" (2:48); 7. "Khel Mandiyela" (3:33); 8. "Andache Dohi" (4:05); 9. "Vrukshwalli Amha Soyare" (3:49); 10. "Are Are Dhyana" (3:14); 11. "Yuge Athavis & Gajjar ( Chant)" (7:20)
2008	Jete Daao Amay	Digital Release Date: 15 August 2008: Label: Sagarika	1. "Jete Daao Amay" (3:19); 2. "Phoole Gandha Nei" (3:16); 3. "O Pakhi Ure Aay" (3:46); 4. "Jibanagaan Gahe Ke Je" (3:41); 5. "Akashe Aaj Ranger Khela" (3:08); 6. "Jodi Kane Kane Kichu" (4:28); 7. "Sagar Dake Aay" (3:47); 8. "Chhonde Chhonde Gane" (3:37); 9. "Jhum Jhum Jhum Raat Nijhum" (3:17); 10. "Chokhe Name Brishti" (3:29); 11. "Ekti Katha" (3:28); 12. "Thuilam Re Mon" (3:18)
2008	Mazhi Gaani	Digital Release Date: 1 November 2008: Label: Sagarika	
2010	A Tribute to R. D. Burman	Digital Release Date: 15 October 2010: Label: Sagarika	1. "Chokhe Name Brishti" (3:32); 2. "Katha Diye Ele Na" (3:43); 3. "Phule Gandha Nei" (3:15); 4. "Chande Chande Gaane Gaane" (3:41); 5. "Bolo Ki Ache Go" (3:19); 6. "Ekti Katha" (3:31); 7. "Jete Dao Amai" (3:21); 8. "Jhum Jhum Raat Nijhum" (3:19); 9. "Bedhechi Beena" (5:52)
2014	Humnasheen	Digital Release Date: 12 February 2014: Label: Times Music	
2015	O Tota Pakhi Re	Digital Release Date: 2015: Label: Sagarika	1. "Shaako Raathe" (3:48); 2. "Maye Dekho Na" (3:18); 3. "Thumi" (3:50); 4. "Mothumadothi Dakeya" (3:18); 5. "Hate Jaranjhan Paaye" (4:37); 6. "Rojapotheyemu Mel"u (3:54); 7. "Bejejaaye Ki Ragini" (3:47); 8. "Ye Thushoor Aadaare" (3:37); 9. "Keno Yemun Aukaro" (4:43); 10. "Aakashe Aaj" (3:09); 11. "Munshialore Shopno" (4:03); 12. "Ye Aakash Tumari" (4:50); 13. "O Shaam Jokun" (3:48); 14. "Yemun Jochonay" (3:46); 15. "Munchaay Munchaay" (5:03); 16. "Tumara Onir Kothar" (3:52); 17. "Biharini" (4:09); 18. "Munirona Mokumothi" (3:02); 19. "Joli Kane Kane" (4:29); 20. "O Tota Pakhi Re" (3:20)
2016	Ei Aakash Tomari	Digital Release Date: 2016: Label: Sagarika	1. "Ei Aakash Tomari"; 2. "Bashi Ekon Ragilo"; 3. "Bristite Dekho Nah"; 4. "Shopneri Gari Chutiye"; 5. "Bhalobashar Kotha"; 6. "Oi Kalo Megh Raate"; 7. "Jai Mon Jak Jak Bheshe"; 8. "Bristi Thamar Ektu Pore"; 9. "Mon Jeno Aaj"; 10. "Cholo Fire Jai"
2017	Milan Piyasi	Digital Release Date: 2017: Label: Sagarika	1. "Sagar Dake Aay"; 2. "Jete Daao Amay"; 3. "Ektu Chaowa Ektu Paowa"; 4. "Nodir Jemon Jharna Ache"; 5. "Lage Dol Patay Patay"; 6. "Andhar Amar Bhalo Lage"; 7. "Aaynate Mukh Dekhbo Na"; 8. "Aaj Keno o Chokhe Laaj"; 9. "Amar Swapno Dekhar Duti"; 10. "Madhumalati Dake Aay"; 11. "Gungun Fagun Sesh Hole"; 12. "Phoole Gandha Nei"
2004	Rim Jhim	Digital Release Date: 2004: Label: Accord Music Corporation	1. "Ami Nirob Hoye Roi"; 2. "Brishtir Kotha"; 3. "Chand Shampan"; 4. "Vabna Amar"; 5. "Valobasha Taar"
2018	Tumi Bolo Ami Shuni (with Swapnil)	Digital Release Date: 2018: Label: Sagarika	1. "Debi Sarotsati"; 2. "E Ratri Akshe"; 3. "Ei Mon Tomake"; 4. "Ghore Je Ar"; 5. "Jak Na Jhore"; 6. "Je Kotha Diyechho"; 7. "Jeo Na Chole"; 8. "Na Deke Na Bole"; 9. "O Pakhi Ure Ja"
2004	Abelay	Digital Release Date: 2 2004 Label Sagarika	

== Angika discography ==
Year	Film	Song	Composer(s)	Lyricist(s)	Co-artist(s)
2007	Khagadiya Wali Bhauji	"Ho Raja Kariyechhi Hum Tore Se Pyaar"	Arvind Jha, Pawan Muradpuri, S. Paul	S. Kumar, Badri Prasad, Ikhlas	Udit Narayan

== Assamese discography ==
Year	Film/Album	Song	Composer(s)	Lyricist(s)	Co-artist(s)
2005	Aaya Bihu Jhoomke	"Mere Liye"	Dony Hazarika	N/A	Roop Kumar Rathod
2005	Aaya Bihu Jhoomke	"Suno Suno"	Dony Hazarika	N/A	Roop Kumar Rathod
2006	Meghor Aare Aare	"Dorodi Dorodi"			Solo
2011	Raamdhenu	"Rang Diya Morom"	Jatin Sharma	Diganta Bharati	Zubeen Garg
2012	Endhare Endhare	"Endhare Endhare"	Prasenjit Lahon	Hiren Bhattacharyya	Solo
2022	Koi Nidiya Kiyaw	"Koi Nidiya Kiyaw"	Keshab Nayan		Papon
2026	Assam Floods Fund Raising Album	"Barixaare Baan"	Papon	Papon	Papon

== English discography ==
- This list includes even the songs in different languages by Ghoshal used in English movies.

Year	Film	Song	Composer(s)	Lyricist(s)	Co-artist(s)
2007	The Great Indian Butterfly	"Kangana" (Female Version)	Deepak Pandit	Manoj Muntashir	
2007	The Great Indian Butterfly	"Meera" (Maine Lio Govind Naam)	Deepak Pandit	Jaideep Sahni	
2010	When Harry Tries to Marry	"Aao Naache Gaaye"	Siddharth Kasyap	Ibrahim Ashk	Rishikesh Kamerkar
2011	Dam 999	"Mujhe Chod Ke" (Female Version)	Ouseppachan	Sohan Roy	
2012	A Gran Plan	"Zindagi Sataaegi"	Kabir Singh, Kaizad Gherda	Jaideep Sahni	
2015	The Second Best Exotic Marigold Hotel	"Yeh Ishq Haye"	Pritam Chakraborty (Re-used by Thomas Newman)	Irshad Kamil	
2015	The Second Best Exotic Marigold Hotel	"Balma"	Himesh Reshammiya (Re-used by Thomas Newman)	Sameer	Sreerama Chandra
2017	Viceroy's House (Dubbed as Partition: 1947 in Hindi)	"Do Dilon Ke"	A. R. Rahman	Navneet Virk	Hariharan
2022	Holidays Around The World	"Invincible"	Pentatonix Team		

== French discography ==
Year	Film	Song	Composer(s)	Lyricist(s)	Co-artist(s)
2004	Pascal of Bollywood	"Johnny D'Jono" (Jane Jana)	Pyarelal	Pascal of Bollywood	Pascal Heni
2004	Pascal of Bollywood	"La Vie En Rose.... Indien"	Pyarelal	Nida Fazli	Pascal Heni

== Gujarati discography ==
Film songs

Year	Film	Song	Composer(s)	Lyricist(s)	Co-artist(s)
2005	Love Is Blind	"Manma Mara Manma"	Kardam Thaker	Sandip Patel	Shaan
2005	Love Is Blind	"Bandh Ankho Ma"	Kardam Thaker	Sandip Patel	Shaan
2005	Hastakshar (Volume 6)	"Aaj Maru Man Manena"	Shyamal-Saumil	Umashankar Joshi	
2016	Romance Complicated	"Maahi"	Jatin-Pratik	Dashrath Mewal	
2018	Natsamrat	"Jat Jao"	Alap Desai	Dilip Rawal	Alap Deasi

Non Film/Album Songs

Year	Film	Song	Composer(s)	Lyricist(s)	Co-artist(s)
2025	Vaarso Season 3	"Mara Hari Ne"	Traditional, Priya Saraiya		Bhavna Labadiya
2026	Katari Kalje Vagi (Gujarati Gazal)	"Katari Kalje Vagi"	Osman Mir	Vinod Manek	Aamir Mir

== Nepali discography ==
Year	Film	Song	Composer(s)	Lyricist(s)	Co-artist(s)
2006	Dhadhkan	"Nachcha Yo Mann Kina Kina"	Suresh Adhikari		Udit Narayan
2011	Only Love	"Chhaechha Basanta"	Nhyoo Bajracharya	Basant Chaudhary	
2011	Only Love	"Sayaun Kaada"	Nhyoo Bajracharya	Basant Chaudhary	
2013	Love Forever	"Timi Aayau"	Nhyoo Bajracharya	Basant Chaudhary	
2013	Love Forever	"Timi Bahek Mero Bhannu"	Nhyoo Bajracharya	Basant Chaudhary	

== Odia discography ==
Year	Film	Song	Composer(s)	Lyricist(s)	Co-artist(s)
2013	Sandehi Priyatama	"Mate Faguna"	Sudhanshu Shekhar Mallick	Sachi Mohanty	Siba Narayan Patanaik

== Tulu discography ==
Year	Film	Song	Composer(s)	Lyricist(s)	Co-artist(s)
2016	Pilibail Yamunakka	"Cheepeda Naal Pada"	Kishore Kumar Shetty	Mayur R. Shetty	Kunal Ganjawala
