= Shreya Ghoshal =

Indian playback singer (born 1984)

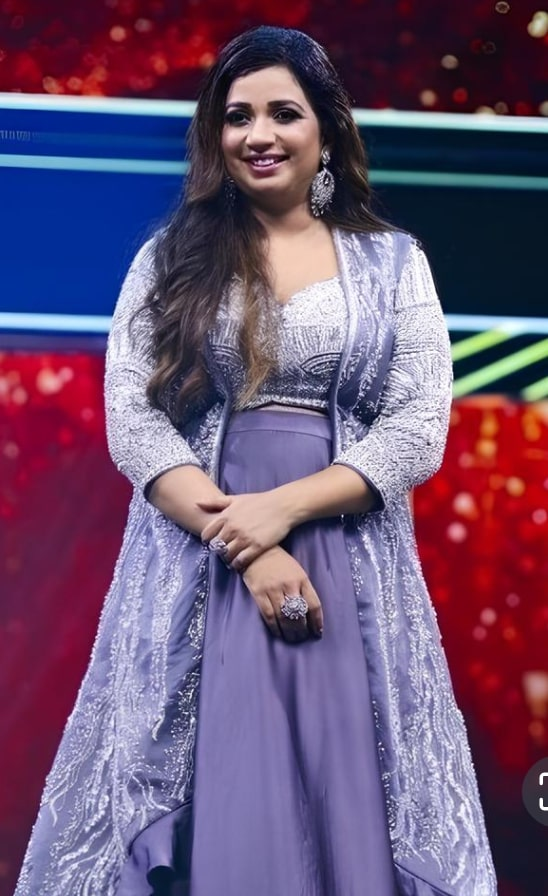
- Ghoshal at the Behindwoods Gold Icons event in 2023
- Pronunciation: [sɾea ɡʱoʃal]
- Born: 12 March 1984 (age 42); Berhampore, West Bengal, India
- Education: SIES College of Arts, Science & Commerce
- Occupation: Playback singer
- Years active: 1998–present
- Works: Discography; filmography
- Spouse: Shiladitya Mukhopadhyaya (m. 2015)
- Children: 1
- Awards: Full list
- Musical career
- Genres: Filmi; Indian pop; Classical; Sufi
- Instrument: Vocals
- Website: shreyaghoshal.com

Signature
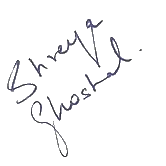

Shreya Ghoshal (Note: Bengali pronunciation: [sɾea ɡʱoʃal].) (Bengali pronunciation: [sɾea ɡʱoʃal]; born 12 March 1984) is an Indian playback singer. Noted for her wide vocal range and versatility, she is cited as one of the most prolific and influential singers of India. She has recorded songs for films and albums in various Indian languages, receiving numerous accolades, including five National Film Awards, four Kerala State Film Awards, two Tamil Nadu State Film Awards, two BFJA Awards, seven Filmfare Awards and ten Filmfare Awards South.

Ghoshal began learning music at the age of four, and started her formal training in classical music when she was six years old. At sixteen, she was noticed by filmmaker Sanjay Leela Bhansali's mother after she won the television singing reality show Sa Re Ga Ma. Following the success, she made her Bollywood playback singing debut with Bhansali's romantic drama Devdas (2002) for which she received a National Film Award for Best Female Playback Singer, a Filmfare Award for Best Female Playback Singer, and a Filmfare RD Burman Award for New Music Talent.

Apart from playback singing, Ghoshal has appeared as a judge on several television reality shows and in music videos. She has been honoured by the state of Ohio in the United States, where Governor Ted Strickland declared 26 June 2010 as "Shreya Ghoshal Day". In April 2013, she was honoured in London by the selected members of the House of Commons of the United Kingdom. She has been featured five times in the Forbes list of the top 100 celebrities from India. In 2017, Ghoshal became the first Indian singer to have her wax figure displayed in the Indian wing of Madame Tussauds Museum in Delhi.

== Early life ==
Shreya Ghoshal was born on 12 March 1984 in Berhampore, Murshidabad, West Bengal into a Bengali family. She spent her early life in Rawatbhata, a small town near Kota, Rajasthan. Her father, Bishwajit Ghoshal, is an electrical engineer and works for the Nuclear Power Corporation of India, and her mother, Sarmistha Ghoshal, is a literature post-graduate. She has a younger brother, Soumyadeep Ghoshal, who is also a musician.

Ghoshal began learning music at the age of four. Ghoshal completed her schooling up to eighth standard at the Atomic Energy Central School No.4 in Rawatbhata. In 1995, she won the All India Light Vocal Music Competition, organized by the Sangam Kala Group, in New Delhi in the sub-junior category.

In 1997, following her father’s transfer to the Bhabha Atomic Research Centre, the family moved to Mumbai. She continued her education at the Atomic Energy Central School in Anushakti Nagar. She later joined the Atomic Energy Junior College to study science but subsequently enrolled at the SIES College of Arts, Science, and Commerce in Mumbai, where she studied arts with English as her major.

Her mother assisted her during early rehearsals and initially focusing on Bengali songs. At the age of six, Ghoshal began receiving formal training in classical music. She trained under the composer Kalyanji for 18 months and later continued her classical music training with Mukta Bhide in Mumbai. Her first stage performance took place at a club's annual function. In 2000, at the age of sixteen, she participated in and won the television music reality show Sa Re Ga Ma (now Sa Re Ga Ma Pa) on the channel Zee TV.

== Career ==
Ghoshal's first recording was "Ganraj Rangi Nachto", which is a cover version of a Marathi song originally sung by Lata Mangeshkar. Her first studio album was Bendhechhi Beena, which was released on 1 January 1998, with 14 tracks. Some of her earlier albums are O Tota Pakhi Re, Ekti Katha (1999), and Mukhor Porag (2000). Ghoshal recorded Bengali studio album Rupasi Raate (2002). Ghoshal recorded devotional songs in albums like Banomali Re (2002), and later, Krishna Bina Ache Ke (2007).

=== 2002–2004: Playback singing debut and breakthrough ===
Ghoshal caught the attention of director Sanjay Leela Bhansali when she participated in the 75th children's special episode of Sa Re Ga Ma. Bhansali's mother, Leela Bhansali was watching the show and during Ghoshal's performance, she called him to watch her performance, after which he decided to give her a chance in his next film. According to Bhansali, Ghoshal's voice had the innocence needed for the character of Paro in Devdas (2002).

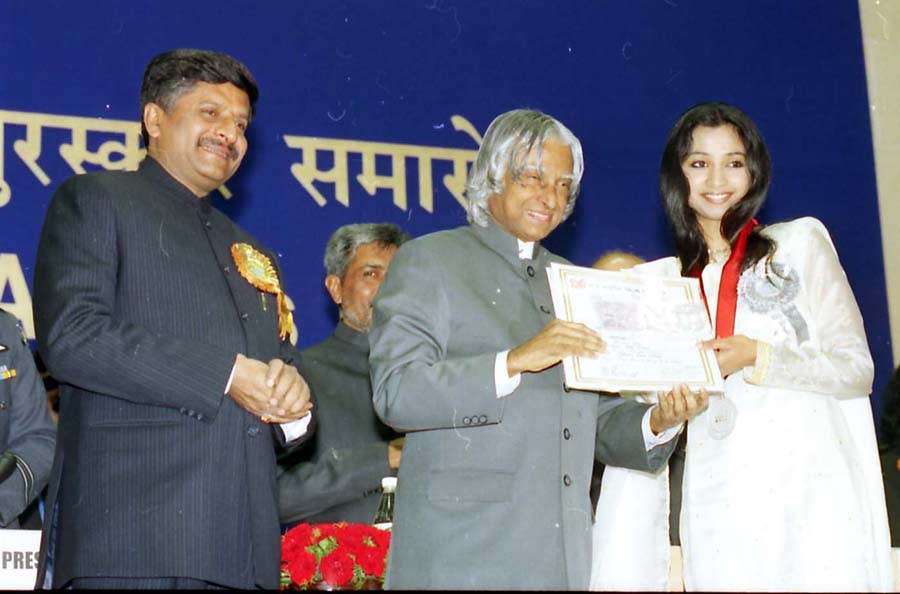
Dr. A.P.J. Abdul Kalam presenting Ghoshal the National Film Award for "Bairi Piya".

In 2000, Bhansali and music director Ismail Darbar offered her the opportunity to be the voice of Paro, the lead female character of Devdas, who was portrayed by Aishwarya Rai. Ghoshal sang five songs in the film, namely, "Silsila Ye Chaahat Ka", "Bairi Piya", "Chalak Chalak", "Morey Piya", and "Dola Re Dola", with established singers such as Kavita Krishnamurthy, Udit Narayan, Vinod Rathod, KK, and Jaspinder Narula. She was sixteen when she recorded the first song for the film, "Bairi Piya" with Udit Narayan. Her Higher Secondary Examinations were nearing that time and she would take her books and notebooks to the studio to study during downtime. "Bairi Piya" was an instant success and topped the charts. The film garnered her first Filmfare Award for Best Female Playback Singer for "Dola Re" (shared with Kavita Krishnamurthy) and a National Film Award for Best Female Playback Singer for "Bairi Piya". Her performance also won her the Filmfare RD Burman Award for New Music Talent.

I remember I was asked to rehearse the song once before finally recording it. I simply closed my eyes and sang without a break. When I opened my eyes, I noticed a lot of excitement and chaos outside the recording room. Then Sanjayji told me I had sung the song so well that they had recorded it at one go.

— Ghoshal sharing her experience of recording "Bairi Piya"

In a 2025 interview with Filmfare, Ghoshal revealed that she had received multiple offers from other filmmakers before Devdas was released, but she declined them all to honor her verbal commitment to Bhansali. She stated, "Had I sung for all these people, I wouldn't have been in *Devdas*, I'm sure about that"

She was an immediate success and was called by various other Indian film industries for recording songs in her voice. Ghoshal was next heard in Darbar-composed Desh Devi, where she performed three tracks for the film.

After rendering traditional semi-classical songs for her previous ventures, Ghoshal performed two seductive numbers for M. M. Kreem's Jism, which prevented her from being stereotyped. According to Ghoshal, "Jaadu Hai Nasha Hai" and "Chalo Tumko Lekar Chale" from the film "made everyone look at [her] in a new light", opening the doors to a "versatile image". She was awarded with another Filmfare trophy for Best Female Playback Singer for the song "Jaadu Hai Nasha Hai". She thereupon worked with Anu Malik, where she performed the female version of "Aye Meri Zindagi", "Seena Pada" and "Aai Jo Teri Yaad", along with the bhajan-styled "Har Taraf". In addition to providing vocals for "Har Taraf", Ghoshal also made her first on-screen appearance in Saaya, as the school girl singing the song. Apart from Inteha, Ghoshal provided vocals for Malik in two other films, Munna Bhai M.B.B.S. and LOC: Kargil, where she recorded the song "Chann Chann" for the former and "Pyaar Bhara Geet" for the latter, along with Sonu Nigam. Besides, Ghoshal made her first collaboration with Shankar–Ehsaan–Loy by performing the female version of the song "Tu Hi Bata Zindagi". Calling her singing "effortless" in the song, The Hindu mentioned that she was "able to impart the required emotions" for the song.

In 2004, Ghoshal contributed to the soundtrack album of Thoda Tum Badlo Thoda Hum by performing four tracks, which were labelled with an "average" tag by Joginder Tuteja from Bollywood Hungama. However, he was "impressed" with Ghoshal's rendition from her songs in Khakee, where he affirmed that Ghoshal's voice suits Aishwarya Rai to the "core" and she "lends credibility to the entire song" in "Wada Raha". Besides, the two duets with Nigam; "Dil Dooba" and "Youn Hi Tum Mujhse", were equally favored by music critics. Further complimenting her vocals in the song "Hum Tumko Nigahon Mein" and "Soniye" from Garv, Tuteja asserted that Ghoshal's "vocals have started to suit the current breed of actresses better and better with each passing day". Apart from Dil Bechara Pyaar Ka Maara, Ghoshal worked with Nikhil–Vinay in other projects, by recording "Betab Dil Hai" from Phir Milenge, and "Woh Ho Tum" from Muskaan.

During the time, Nadeem–Shravan composed Tumsa Nahin Dekha: A Love Story was considered to be the biggest album for Ghoshal, as she sang all the numbers with an exception of one song. She performed a wide variety of songs—from a jazzy number to soft romantic tunes—in the album. According to Ghoshal, the album allowed her to "experiment with the entire range" of her "singing capabilities". Besides, Ghoshal lent her voice for Malik, where she sang "Tumhe Jo Maine Dekha" and "Gori Gori" for Main Hoon Na apart from the title track. Mid-Day affirmed that Ghoshal provided "perfect accompaniment" for the track, while Rediff.com was "impressed with her rendition". The year marks her first collaboration with Rajesh Roshan and Pritam by singing the melodious track for the former composed "Saansein Ghulne Lagi" from Aetbaar and performing the track "Shikdum" from Dhoom, for the latter.

She debuted in the Tamil cinema through the song "Yen Chellam" in Vasanthabalan's film Album (2002), She made her Telugu debut for music director Mani Sharma in Okkadu (2003). She made her debut in Kannada cinema with the song "Krishna Nee Begane Baaro" in the movie Paris Pranaya (2003). Ghoshal debuted in Malayalam cinema through a studio album of composer Alphons Joseph and later gave voice to his song "Vida Parayukayano" from Big B (2007).

=== 2005–2007: Established singer ===
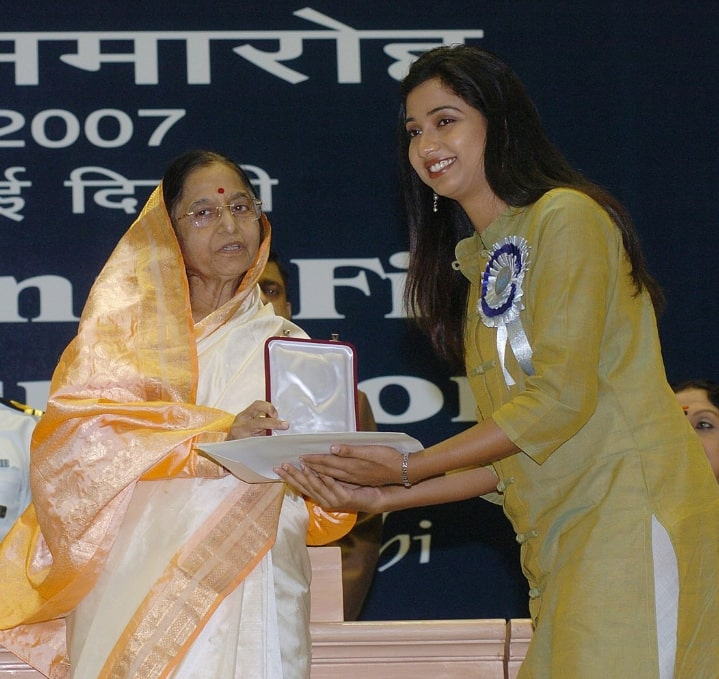
Pratibha Patil presenting Ghoshal her second National Film Award.

Ghoshal was bestowed with her second National Film Award for her rendition of "Dheere Jalna" in Paheli, which she sang alongside Sonu Nigam. As claimed by Daily News and Analysis, the song "treads the fine balance between the classical and popular genre of Hindi film music". Barring the song "Dheere Jalna", Ghoshal was heard in two other tracks "Kangna Re" and "Minnat Kare", composed by M.M. Kreem. She provided vocals for Kreem in one of his another compositions: "Guzar Na Jaye" from Rog. With the film Parineeta, she made her first collaboration with Shantanu Moitra. She performed four tracks from the film alongside Sonu Nigam, which includes "Piyu Bole", "Kasto Mazza" and "Soona Man Ka Aangan". Thereupon, she worked for the soundtrack album of Yahaan, performing a soulful track "Naam Adaa Likhna", "Urzu Urzu Durkut" and a Punjabi track "Mele Chaliyan". Ghoshal's work in both the films was widely acclaimed, subsequently being nominated for the Filmfare Awards with the song "Piyu Bole". Reportedly, Ghoshal was selected to sing the female rendition of the track after being auditioned by many other artistes. In an interview, Moitra stated; "Pradeep wanted a little trill of laughter in the middle of the song and she did it effortlessly".

Along with "Piyu Bole", Ghoshal received another Filmfare nomination for her rendition of the song "Agar Tum Mil Jao" from Zeher. The song along with "Jaane Ja Jaane Ja" from the same film was acclaimed by music critics. Apart from providing supporting vocals for Himesh Reshammiya's "Aashiq Banaya Aapne", Ghoshal's voice had been used in some of his other compositions released during the year. However, while reviewing Malik-composed "Pehle Se", Bollywood Hungama wrote: "Ghoshal sang in a mature manner and did so well and once again she proved herself as a dependable playback singer". Similar sentiments were echoed for the song "Bolo To" from Shabd which was composed by Vishal–Shekhar.

2006 marks Ghoshal's first collaboration with Ravindra Jain in the film Vivah, where she performed three duets with Narayan titled "Mujhe Haq Hai", "Do Anjaane Ajnabi" and "Milan Abhi Aadha Adhura Hai". For the album, she also recorded "Hamari Shaadi Mein" with Babul Supriyo and two sisters conversation song "O Jiji" with Pamela Jain, along with a bhajan performed with Jain. Ghoshal's "obsessive" vocals were appraised in Roop Kumar Rathod's composition, "So Jaoon Main" from Woh Lamhe. Despite the length, the version was particularly acclaimed from the album. During the year, Ghoshal performed her first ever duet with Sunidhi Chauhan—though they have contributed in multi-singer songs together—with the Salim–Sulaiman's composition, "Imaan Ka Asar" from Dor. In spite of providing backing vocals for Lage Raho Munna Bhai's "Bande Mein Tha Dum", Ghoshal and Nigam performed a romantic duet titled "Pal Pal", a composition by Moitra. For the song, she received a Best Female Playback Singer nomination at the 52nd Filmfare Awards. She was next heard with Vishal Bhardwaj in the song "O Saathi Re", which exudes the feeling of intimacy and deep love. Ghoshal's low pitch rendition in the song was positively noted by critics.

In 2006, Ghoshal sang "Pyaar Ki Ek Kahani"and "Koi Tumsa Nahin" with Sonu Nigam and "Chori Chori Chupke Chupke" with Udit Narayan for Rajesh Roshan-composed Krrish which were also favored by the critics. Reviewing the album, Bollywood Hungama wrote: "Ghoshal is extremely competent and justifies her continued presence in the big league". They also mentioned that Ghoshal has reached to a similar level of Alka Yagnik in terms of "class, quality and style".

In 2007, Ghoshal recorded a thumri in the mujra style for Khoya Khoya Chand. Titled "Chale Aao Saiyan" and composed by Moitra, the song was particularly praised for Ghoshal's "different" vocal structure. She even lent her voice for two other songs for the album; "Sakhi Piya" and "Thirak Thirak". She reunited with Moitra for Laaga Chunari Mein Daag, where she performed "Hum To Aise Hain" along with Chauhan which also had Swanand Kirkire and Pranab Biswas lending supporting vocals. Raja Sen found "Kachchi Kaliyaan" song from the film less appealing with its "bad remix background" though praised Ghoshal, Chauhan, KK and Nigam for giving the song "the vim it requires". Apart from providing background alaap in Monty Sharma's composition "Masha-Allah", Ghoshal was heard in the classically oriented numbers "Jaan-E-Jaan" and "Sawar Gayi", included in the album Saawariya. She also recorded her first track in a Sanjay Leela Bhansali's composition, "Thode Badmaash" for the same album, providing a "feminine quality" to her "temperate nuances".

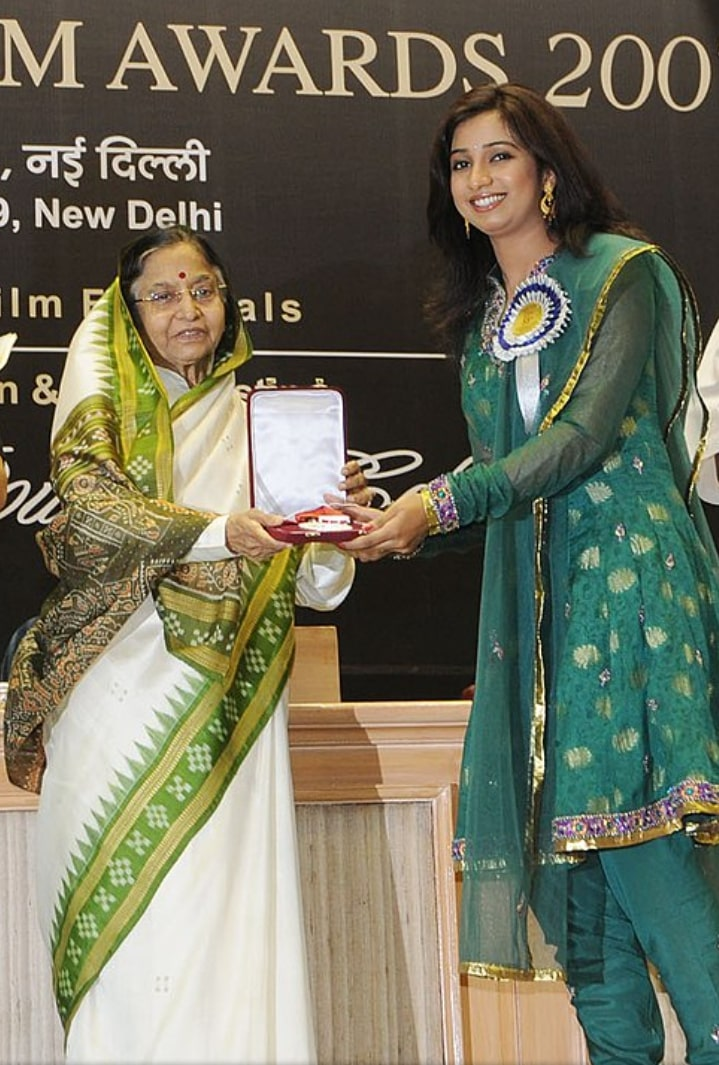
Pratibha Patil presenting Ghoshal her third National Film Award.

In the same year, Ghoshal sang "Barso Re", composed by A. R. Rahman, for Mani Ratnam's Guru. A review from Oneindia praised Ghoshal's rendition of the song and opined that it was a different incarnation of her in comparison to her previous records. The song won her third Filmfare Award for Best Female Playback Singer. The same year, she came up with the song "Yeh Ishq Haaye" from Jab We Met, composed by Pritam which was successful in earning her a third National Film Award for Best Female Playback Singer.

The duo also worked with the classical track "Mere Dholna" for Bhool Bhulaiyaa (2007), performed beside M. G. Sreekumar, which was acclaimed with special mention to the taan towards the "climax of the song". Ghoshal also lent her voice for Vishal–Shekhar with few of his compositions and was particularly praised for the theme song of Ta Ra Rum Pum along with the romantic song "Main Agar Kahoon", which she sang with Sonu Nigam and the dance song "Dhoom Taana" from film Om Shanti Om, where some critics compared her singing style of the latter with S. Janaki. In the year, Ghoshal worked with Ilaiyaraaja for the album Cheeni Kum.

=== 2008–2014: Further success ===
After singing for films such as U Me Aur Hum, Sirf, Ghatothkach, Dashavatar, Mere Baap Pehle Aap, De Taali, Haal-e-Dil, Thoda Pyaar Thoda Magic and Kismat Konnection, Ghoshal recorded another hit song for Singh Is Kinng (2008), titled "Teri Ore", composed by Pritam Chakraborty. It received mixed reviews from music critics. The song earned her a fourth Filmfare Award for Best Female Playback Singer and overall fifth Filmfare Award. After that, she lent her voice for films like Bachna Ae Haseeno, God Tussi Great Ho, Welcome to Sajjanpur, Kidnap, Karzzzz, Ghajini, Ek Vivaah... Aisa Bhi, Dostana, Yuvvraaj and others. She won her fourth National award for singing "Pherari Mon" for the Bengali film Antaheen (2008), and "Jeev Rangla" for the Marathi film Jogwa (2008). She rendered two songs for the 2010 film Dabangg, "Tere Mast Mast Do Nain" with Rahat Fateh Ali Khan and "Chori Kiya Re Jiya" with Sonu Nigam. According to a music review published by Planet Bollywood, "the biggest attraction of this song is the duet by the fantastic jodi of Sonu Nigam and Shreya Ghoshal who prove yet again why they rank as the finest singers of their generation" In 2010, Ghoshal sang for the English independent film When Harry Tries to Marry. In the same year, Ghoshal rendered her voice for a song "Aadha Ishq" from film Band Baaja Baaraat which composed by Salim–Sulaiman. Satyajit of Glamsham stated, "Shreya Ghoshal's feminine vocal textures have always been reliable in ballads".

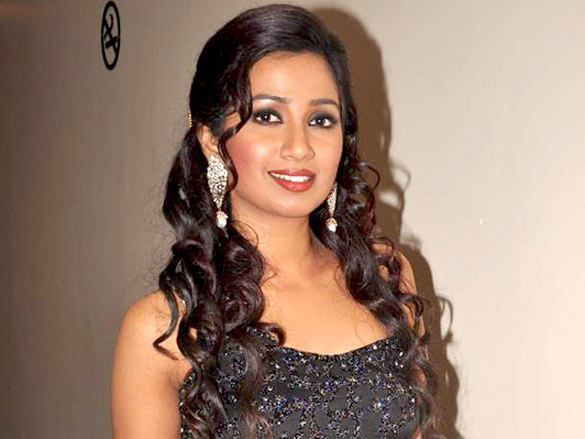
Ghoshal on the sets of X Factor India, 2011

In 2011, Ghoshal recorded hit duet song "Saibo" in film Shor in the City with Tochi Raina, a composition by Sachin–Jigar. Satyajit from Glamsham reported, "Sweetly toned and mesmerized with mellifluous flows of Shreya Ghoshal singing, the first outing "Saibo" is a smoothening surprise that extols the feel of romanticism to perfection". Later that year, Ghoshal sang the duet "Teri Meri" in film Bodyguard with Rahat Fateh Ali Khan. A Himesh Reshammiya composition, the song received positive to mixed reviews. NDTV labelled the song as "moderately paced and average". Ghoshal later collaborated with Bappi Lahiri in the duet "Ooh La La" from film The Dirty Picture. Abid from Glamsham stated that Ghoshal manage to keep up the fun tempo with an improvised and highly entertaining and excellent renditions. Ghoshal received further two nominations that year at Filmfare Awards for songs "Saibo" and "Teri Meri.

In 2012, Ghoshal rendered her voice for popular item song, "Chikni Chameli" from film Agneepath. The song was composed by Ajay–Atul and was a remake of their own Marathi song "Kombdi Palali" from film Jatra. Joginder Tuteja of Bollywood Hungama stated, "A special word for Shreya Ghoshal too who changes her singing style in a big way and comes up trumps. She gets the kind of rustic flavour that was the need of the hour and is superb in her rendition." Ghoshal received her one of the two Filmfare nominations of the year for the song. Later, she revealed that she "wasn't very comfortable" singing the song because of its vulgar lyrics and requested the makers to change few words in it. She won her second Tamil Nadu Best Female Playback Singer for recording "Sollitaley Ava Kadhalaa" from the adventure drama Kumki. The same year, she performed four songs, all composed by Sajid–Wajid for film Rowdy Rathore which received mixed reviews from critics. For the duet song "Dhadang Dhang Dhang" performed by Ghoshal alongside Sajid, Devesh Sharma of Filmfare remarked, "Shreya Ghoshal puts the '90s ka tadka' in her rendition" and for lullaby song "Chandaniya" he said, "Shreya Ghoshal sounds uncannily like Alka Yagnik and proves that she is a singer for all occasions". Joginder Tuteja from Bollywood Hungama stated in relation to "Chandaniya", "Shreya Ghoshal can fit into any mode as per the demand of the situation". The song "Tera Ishq Bada Teekha" received mixed reviews from music critics. Ghoshal then lent her voice in a Four-part harmony song, "Radha" from Student of the Year alongside Udit Narayan, Vishal Dadlani and Shekhar Ravjiani which garnered critical appreciation. In the same year, she again collaborated with A. R. Rahman for a duet song "Saans" from film Jab Tak Hai Jaan along with Mohit Chauhan. The song received positive to mixed reviews by critics. At the poll conducted by Indiatimes, the song Saans won the title of "Most Romantic Song of the year 2012". The song earned Ghoshal second of her two Filmfare nominations of the year.

In early 2013, Ghoshal sang two duet songs "Naino Mein Sapna" and "Taki O Taki" for film Himmatwala. The songs were originally composed by Bappi Lahri and re-created by Sajid–Wajid. Both songs received positive reviews from music critics. For "Naino Mein Sapna", critics of NDTV mentioned, "Shreya sounds tailormade for the track" and for "Taki Taki" they remarked, "Ghoshal proves yet again her mettle in the industry". For "Naino Mein Sapna", Shivi from Komoi stated, "Shreya Ghoshal replace Lata Mangeshkar and do a decent job". Ghoshal sang the female version of Sunn Raha Hai in Aashiqui 2 composed by Ankit Tiwari and written by Sandeep Nath. She garnered critical praise over Ankit Tiwari who sang the male version of the song. Apart from rendering vocals for A. R. Rahman composed "Banarasiya" in Raanjhanaa, Ghoshal lent her voice for duet "God, Allah aur Bhagwan" in Krrish 3 alongside Sonu Nigam. "Banarasiya" met with largely positive reviews, the latter received mixed reactions. Ghoshal next performed two tracks in Goliyon Ki Raasleela Ram-Leela namely "Dhoop" and "Nagada Sang Dhol" both composed by the director of film, Sanjay Leela Bhansali. She earned positive to mixed response for former and mostly positive reviews for the latter. Mohar Basu of Koimoi stated in regards to "Dhoop", "Shreya Ghoshal's voice croons hauntingly and this song evokes a range of deep emotions. Passionately sung and flatteringly themed, this song makes evident the reason why Ghoshal can be compared to music veterans of the industry." Ghoshal received two Filmfare nominations for songs "Sunn Raha Hai" and "Nagada Sang Dhol" that year.

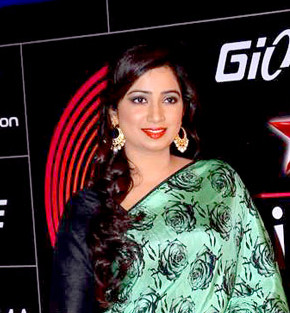
Ghoshal at 4th Global Indian Music Academy Awards, 2014

In 2014, Ghoshal recorded three songs for film PK namely the solo "Nanga Punga Dost" and duets "Chaar Kadam" and "Love is a Waste of Time" with Shaan and Sonu Nigam respectively. Later in the same year, she sang the duet "Manwa Laage" with Arijit Singh for film Happy New Year composed by Vishal–Shekhar duo and written by Irshad Kamil. After its release, "Manwa Laage" crossed two million views in 48 hours on YouTube worldwide. Ghoshal got another nomination at Filmfare Awards for the song.

Even though Ghoshal had a remarkable career in the Malayalam singing industry, her signature Malayalam song came with "Vijanathayil" from the Malayalam film How Old Are You?. The Times of India described Ghoshal's voice to be magnetic and honey-dripping. She won the Filmfare Award for Best Malayalam Female Playback Singer and the Kerala State Film Award for Best Malayalam Best Playback Singer. She won the former award consecutively in 2014 and 2015 when she won it again for "Kaathirunnu" from Ennu Ninte Moideen. Her Malayalam accent and pronunciation was praised.

=== 2015–2017: Career progression ===
2015 started with Ghoshal's collaboration with A. R. Rahman in Tamil film I. Besides rendering vocals for original Tamil duet "Pookkalae Sattru Oyivedungal" alongside Haricharan, she also dubbed its Hindi version "Tu Chale". and Telugu version "Poolane Kunukeyamantaa". The original Tamil version song "Pookkalae Sattru Oyivedungal" was met with positive reviews by critics, with most critics praising the vocals of Ghoshal. Nicy V.P. from International Business Times commented on Tamil version, "Haricharan's crystal clear voice, Shreya's Hindustani driven singing lead to a chart-buster, here. With regards to Shreya Ghoshal, we have to dig deep the dictionary to come up with some new adjectives to praise her singing." Later that year, Ghoshal sang the female version of song "Hasi" from film Hamari Adhuri Kahani composed by Ami Mishra which got critical precedence over male version sung by Ami Mishra himself. Devesh Sharma from Filmfare remarked, "The female version of Hasi, sung by Shreya Ghoshal, works better than the male version, sung by guest composer Ami Mishra himself. Ghoshal elevates it with her superb effort and the softer arrangement works better for it overall." Ghoshal also performed the female version of the song "Gaaye Jaa" for the film Brothers composed by Ajay–Atul which received positive reviews from music critics. The Times of India stated, "Shreya Ghoshal scores brownie points for her rendition". Glamsham praised Ghoshal's vocals labelling them "sugary sweet and superbly controlled". Bollywood Life commented, "Shreya Ghoshal amazes the listener by making this situational song such a great listen and just for her lovely voice, one has to put this song on a loop" The same year saw Ghoshal again collaborating with Sanjay Leela Bhansali in Bajirao Mastani. She performed three songs in the film, namely "Mohe Rang Do Laal", "Deewani Mastani" and "Pinga". She also dubbed these songs in Tamil and Telugu versions of the film's soundtrack. The qawwali interlude song "Deewani Mastani" in the film fetched her sixth Filmfare Award, fifth for Best female playback singer.

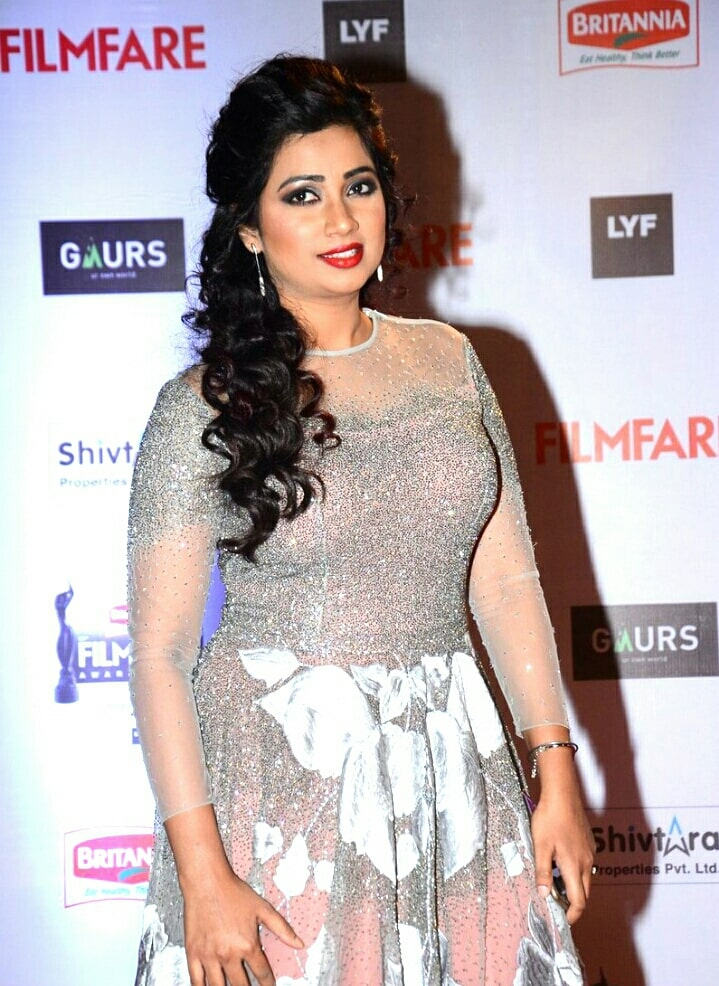
Ghoshal at the 61st Filmfare Awards, 2016

In early 2016, Ghoshal provided vocals for duet "Tere Bin" from film Wazir alongside Sonu Nigam. Composed by Shantanu Moitra and written by Vidhu Vinod Chopra, the song opened to positive reviews by critics. Labelling the song as "a beautiful start for the film", critics from Bollywood Hungama commented, "Though the sound of song is quite classical for a film which is set in the current times, one can well expect that it would fit in well into the narrative." Ghoshal was next heard in song "Tum Bin Jiya" in film Sanam Re, composed by Jeet Ganguly. It was a recreation of a song with same title from 2001 film Tum Bin sung by K. S. Chithra and composed by Nikhil–Vinay. The song received positive to negative reviews. Ghoshal sang the songs "Mere Aankhon Se Nikle Aansoo" and "Ishq Ki Baarish" written by Sameer and composed by Nadeem Saifi in the film Ishq Forever for which critics compared Ghoshal singing style to veteran singer Alka Yagnik. For the song "Mere Aankhon Se Nikle Aansoo", The Times of India commented, "Shreya create magic in [the song], which is straight from the heart. Ghoshal provided vocals for song "Aatach Baya Ka Baavarla" in Marathi film Sairat composed by Ajay–Atul which was well received by critics. Ghoshal's collaboration with Ankit Tiwari in song "Jab Tum Hote Ho" from film Rustom was critically well received. Devesh Sharma of Filmfare labelled the song "sombre" and praised use of Ghoshal's "melodious" voice in the song. Ghoshal was next heard in Tamil film Devi in which she rendered her vocals for song "Rang Rang Rangoli". Ghoshal also dubbed Hindi version of the song titled "Ranga Re" as the film was released along with Tamil in Hindi and Telugu as well with Telugu version "Rang Rang Rangare" being sung by Swetha Mohan. India West praised the Hindi version by quoting, "Ghoshal proves that she can tread Sunidhi Chauhan terrain effortlessly in parts of the song, and her strong vocals once again put up a strong case for playback singers (females)". The Tamil version of song also opened to positive reviews.

In early 2017, Ghoshal rendered "Aashiq Surrender Hua" duet along with co-singer and composer Amaal Mallik from the film Badrinath Ki Dulhania. the song in itself was much appreciated for its quirky lyrics which were penned down by lyricist: Shabbir Ahmed. "Aashiq Surrender Hua" was one of the rare songs in which Ghoshal was heard in a lower register than what she usually sings in. As Swetha Ramakrishnan from Firstpost reiterated, "The best thing about the song is Shreya Ghoshal singing in a lower pitch; something one rarely gets to hear." In regards to the singers, Gaurang Chauhan from Bollywood Life stated, "Both are a unique choice for such a song and they nail it." Ghoshal was next heard in "Rozana" from the film Naam Shabana for which Ghoshal's vocals were specifically met with critically positive reviews. Shriram Iyengar from Cinestaan mentioned, "Ghoshal's voice brings a mesmerising touch to the song, with a perfect balance of happiness and contentment." Praising Ghoshal's vocals in "Rozana", India West commented, "To say that she makes the best out of this increasingly rare occasion in film music is superfluous." Apart from rendering vocals for A. R. Rahman composed "Do Dilon Ke" duet along with Hariharan in the Hindi dubbed version of the film Viceroy's House, Ghoshal also lent her voice for duet "Hans Mat Pagli" in Toilet: Ek Prem Katha alongside Sonu Nigam. Both songs were critically acclaimed. Joginder Tuteja from Bollywood Hungama stated that "The combination of Sonu-Shreya takes the song to a different altogether and worthy of repeat hear."

In 2017, Ghoshal also sang the duet "Thodi Der" with co-singer and music director Farhan Saeed for the film Half Girlfriend. She received a Filmfare Award for Best Female Playback Singer nomination for the song. Komoi stated, "Ghoshal's voice as sweet as honey mesmerizes the listener in Thodi Der". Glamsham reported, "Ghoshal is simply fantastic and [song] can be put on repeat mode". In the same year, Ghoshal sang two songs in fifth episode of Mixtape, a web series launched by T-Series for which she received positive response. Ghoshal's four Kannada songs were included in The Times of India list of "10 Best Romantic Songs of 2017", which are "Usire Usire" from Hebbuli, "Ondu Malebillu" from Chakravarthy, "Ninna Snehadinda" from Mugulu Nage and "Chippinolagade" from Maasthi Gudi. Her Telugu song "Blockbuster" from Sarrainodu was voted as number one in 10 Best Party Songs of 2017 by the same.

=== 2018–2021: Independent work and career expansion ===
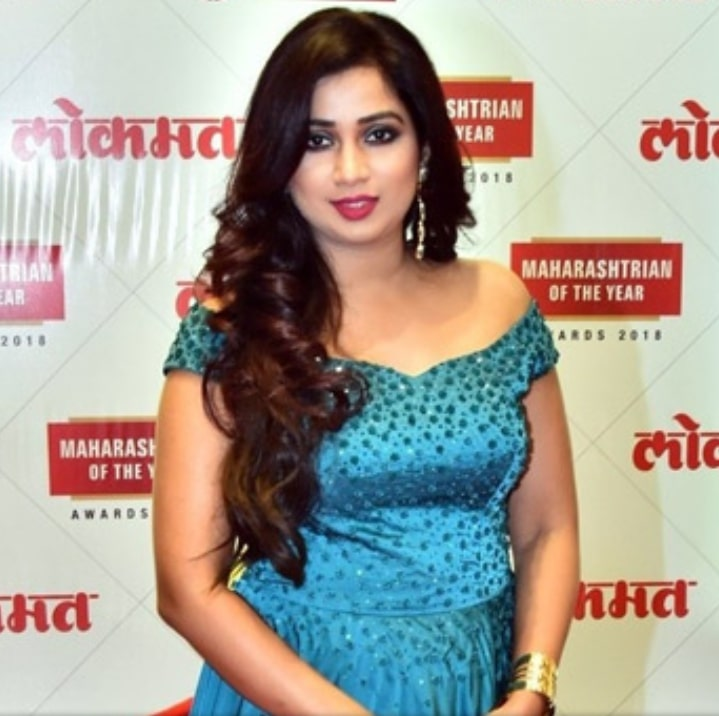
Ghoshal at the Lokmat Maharashtrian of the Year Awards, 2018

2018 started for Ghoshal collaborating with S. Thaman for the song "Mandhaara" from Bhaagamathie. She later provided her rendition for "Allasani Vaari" from Tholi Prema. She also lent her voice to four songs for the delayed film Phir Se... (2018). Ghoshal continued with the song "Ghoomar" from the period drama Padmaavat, along with Swaroop Khan. Composed by film's director Sanjay Leela Bhansali himself, it was based on the traditional music and dance forms performed by the Rajput queens of Rajasthan. The song was well received, with critics praising Ghoshal for her rendition. Gaurang Chauhan from Times Now noted that the song "is appealing and will be, if not already, a favourite among dance performers across India." "Ghoomar" went on to earn Ghoshal the Filmfare Award for Best Female Singer. She was next heard in the recreated version of "Ek Do Teen" from Tezaab (1988) in Baaghi 2 and the title track of Dhadak (2018).

Ghoshal started 2019 with two classical numbers, "Ghar More Pardesiya" and "Tabah Ho Gaye" for Abhishek Varman's period drama Kalank, for which she won numerous awards and accolades including a Zee Cine Award for Best Female Playback Singer. Later, sang "Yeh Aaina" for the film Kabir Singh, composed by Amaal Mallik and written by Irshad Kamil, which was picturised on the film's lead Shahid Kapoor and supporting actress Nikita Dutta, and "Habibi Ke Nain" along with Jubin Nautiyal, composed by Sajid–Wajid, for the film Dabangg 3. Later that year, she was also heard as the lead singer, in a first, alongside fellow singer and rapper Mellow D, on Kiske Liye Tu Marega and Dega Jaan, two versions of the upbeat title track of Raj Nidimoru and Krishna D.K.'s Manoj Bajpayee – starrer Amazon Prime Video original series The Family Man, composed by Sachin–Jigar. Her rendition of the tracks was widely praised, with the lyrics receiving appreciation for being an ode to middle class struggles in the Indian society.

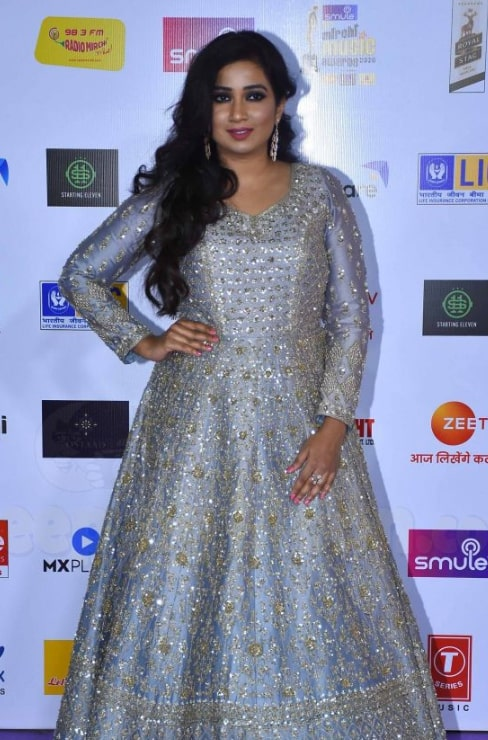
Ghoshal at the 12th Mirchi Music Awards, 2020

Ghoshal started the new decade by featuring in several independent singles. She released an independent single titled "Nah Woh Main" in which she was also credited as a songwriter and composer. Ghoshal next recorded the musical renditions of poems by Pandit Birju Maharaj for the album Mann Bheetar (2020). She recorded two classical songs for the album, the title track "Mann Bheetar" and a song titled "Bhari Bhari". Later she released a song titled "Apni Maati" which was released on the 73rd Independence Day of India as a tribute. The song was praised for its patriotic message and was also used to promote the "Save Soil" movement initiated by Sadhguru's Isha Foundation. Ghoshal was next featured on tracks titled, "Judaiyaan" a collaboration with Darshan Raval for his album named Judaiyaan (2020) which peaked at number-one on Billboard Top Triller Global chart, and "Muraliya" a collaboration with Salim–Sulaiman for their album named Bhoomi (2020). Additionally, Ghoshal also sang several Bollywood songs in 2020 including, "Maay Bhavani" from Tanhaji, "Ghar Bhara Sa Lage" from Shikara, "Taare Ginn" from Dil Bechara, "Paheli" from Shakuntala Devi, etc.

Ghoshal started 2021 with a ballad titled "Chal Wahin Chalein" from Saina for which she received praise. A critic based at Filmfare in his music review wrote, "Shreya Ghoshal sure knows how to tease out the nuances hidden in the lyrics and Amaal Mallik lets the singer take the lead in this melodious song, keeping the music in check." Ghoshal was next featured in a song titled "Param Sundari" from Mimi which became one of the biggest hits of the year, and peaked at No. 184 on the Billboard Global Excl. U.S. chart. The song also garnered critical acclaim and a Filmfare Award nomination for Ghoshal. Ghoshal next sang a song titled "Zaalima Coca Cola" for the film Bhuj: The Pride of India. Ghoshal then featured in two tracks of Atrangi Re soundtrack, "Chaka Chak" and "Tere Rang", both of which garnered critical acclaim. The former also became an instant hit and went viral on Instagram Reels. It earned Ghoshal another Filmfare Award nomination. "Chaka Chak", "Param Sundari" and "Zaalima Coca Cola" were amongst the top twenty-five most viewed Hindi songs of 2021. Ghoshal also featured in several independent singles in 2021 including, "Oh Sanam" with Tony Kakkar, "Pyaar Ek Tarfaa" with Amaal Mallik, "Pyaar Karte Ho Na" with Javed–Mohsin, and "Angana Morey" which was a solo independent single of Ghoshal for which she was credited as a songwriter and composer. The song peaked at number-one on the Billboard Top Triller Global chart.

=== 2022–present: Further critical recognition ===
Ghoshal started 2022 with a Punjabi-language independent single titled "Uff". Ghoshal was next featured in a song titled "Jab Saiyaan" from Gangubai Kathiawadi for which she received critical acclaim. Lakshmi Govindrajan of Firstpost in her music review called it the best song on the album and wrote, "This love ballad opens with a harmonium and a sarangi, perfectly establishing the ornate kotha vibe. Yet in the setting of a courtesan, sounds a voice so sweet and embodying so much innocence that only a singer of Shreya Ghoshal's calibre can pull off something so virginal in a whore house". The Indian Express listed "Jab Saiyaan" as one of the best songs of 2022, and it earned Ghoshal Filmfare and IIFA Award nominations. Ghoshal next sang a song titled, "Heer Raanjhana" for the film Bachchhan Paandey. The billboard of the song was featured at New York's Times Square. Ghoshal was next featured in the soundtrack of a multilingual film Radhe Shyam in which she sang two songs, "Ninnele" in Telugu and "Unnaalae" in Tamil. Ghoshal then featured in the soundtrack of Ajay–Atul's Marathi-language musical, Chandramukhi. She sang two songs, a lavani titled "Chandra" and a ballad titled "To Chand Rati" both of which garnered critical acclaim. The former received a Marathi Filmfare nomination, and went viral on Instagram Reels becoming a global hit. She next sang a song titled "Makhmali" for the film Samrat Prithviraj. Ghoshal then featured in Bhool Bhulaiyaa 2 soundtrack in which she recorded several versions of her 2007 classical song "Mere Dholna" or "Ami Je Tomar". Ghoshal next recorded a new rendition of her 2014 Tamil-language song, "Sundari Pennae" for Berklee Indian Ensemble's Grammy-nominated album, Shuruaat (2022). Ghoshal next featured in an independent single titled "Baarish Aayi Hain" which was a duet with Stebin Ben. Ghoshal then featured in the soundtrack of film Raksha Bandhan for which she recorded three songs, the title track "Raksha Bandhan", "Dhaagon Se Baandhaa", and the reprise version of the title track, all of them met with positive critical response and the former two were listed amongst the best songs to celebrate the festival of Raksha Bandhan. Ghoshal then leant her voice to the female version of song "Dil" from the film Ek Villain Returns which was titled, "Dil (Shreya's Version)". Ghoshal was next featured in a Punjabi-language independent single titled, "Tere Bajjon" which was composed by Jatinder Shah.

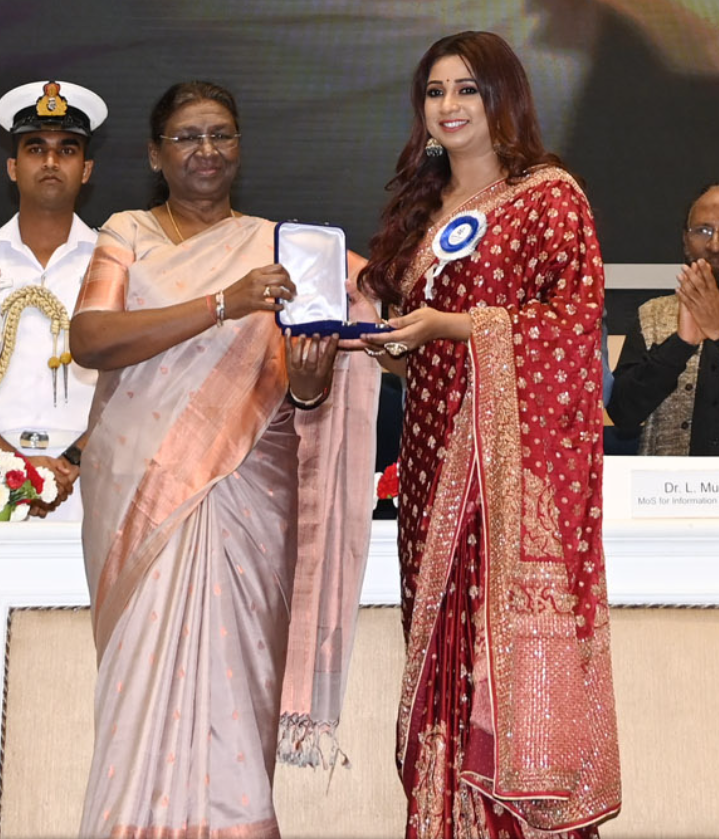
President, Droupadi Murmu presenting Ghoshal her fifth National Film Award.

Ghoshal leant her voice to several A. R. Rahman compositions in 2022 across different languages starting with "Maayava Thooyava" for the Tamil-language film, Iravin Nizhal, which received positive critical response. She also sang the Telugu version of it titled, "Mayava Chayava" with most of the verses in Telugu and some lines in Tamil for which she won her fifth National Film Award for Best Female Playback Singer. She was the first singer to win a National Award for a bilingual song. She also became the first singer to win the National Award for recordings in five different languages. Ghoshal then sang a Tamil song titled "Unna Nenachadhum" for the film Vendhu Thanindhathu Kaadu. She then recorded a song "Thumbi Thullal" for the soundtrack of a Tamil-language film, Cobra which garnered critical acclaim. Additionally, she also leant her voice to its Kannada ("Dumbi Dumbi"), Malayalam ("Thumbi Thullal"), and Telugu ("Choope Oohallo") versions. Ghoshal's final collaboration of 2022 with Rahman was a song titled "Ratchasa Maamaney" for the soundtrack of a Tamil-language film, Ponniyin Selvan: I. She also recorded the Telugu ("Raachasa Maavaya"), Kannada ("Rakshasa Maamane"), Hindi ("Rakshas Mama Re"), and Malayalam ("Rakshasa Maamane") version of the same song, and in addition to that she sang a song titled "Bol" for the Hindi-language soundtrack of the film. Ghoshal received critical acclaim for both the songs, Suanshu Khurana of The Indian Express in her music review noted the "extraordinary delicacy" in the way Ghoshal sang "Rakshas Mama Re" and further wrote that Ghoshal "excels" in conversational and charming "Bol". Ghoshal then sang a Garba song titled, "Boom Padi" for the film Maja Ma which received critical praise. Ghoshal next featured in the soundtrack of film Brahmāstra: Part One – Shiva in which she sang a song called "Rasiya", which earned her the IIFA Award for Best Female Playback Singer. She then featured on a track titled, "Laut Aa Mere Des" a collaboration with Salim–Sulaiman for their album Bhoomi (2022). Ghoshal next featured on a track titled, "Invincible" a collaboration with American a cappella group Pentatonix for their Grammy-nominated album, Holidays Around the World (2022). Ghoshal then featured in Sanjay Leela Bhansali's Ghazal album, Sukoon (2022) in which she leant her voice to two ghazals titled, "Tujhe Bhi Chand" and "Qaraar". Critic Subhash K. Jha in his review praised "Tujhe Bhi Chand" for having a playful lit and an evocative hook line and while praising "Qaraar" he wrote, "Shreya's interpretation of Momin Khan Momin's immortal Ghazal woh jo hum mein tum mein qaraar tha is laborious". Ghoshal finished 2022 with songs titled, "Jo Tum Saath Ho" (Duet and Lullaby version) from Salaam Venky, "Sun Zara" from Cirkus, and "Sukh Kalale" from Marathi-language film Ved, which was met with positive critical response and received a Marathi Filmfare nomination.

Ghoshal began 2023 with a rendition of a bhajan "Vaishnava Jana To", which was rearranged and programmed by A. R. Rahman for the film Gandhi Godse – Ek Yudh. Next, she collaborated with new singer Laqshay Kapoor on an indie song titled "Sohnneyaa". After that, she recorded the song "Nouka Doobi" for the film Lost. Later, she recorded "Baharla Ha Madhumas", a duet with Ajay Gogawale, for the Marathi-language film Maharashtra Shahir. The song went viral on TikTok and Instagram Reels, gaining both domestic and global attention. She then recorded a song called "Maine Pi Rakhi Hai" for the film Tu Jhoothi Main Makkaar. Sharanya Kumar of Film Companion praised Ghoshal for singing the song with a "feisty attitude" and added that her "dynamic vocal inflections" made the song more fun. She then featured in the soundtrack of the Tamil-language film Ponniyin Selvan: II, singing the Hindi version of "Veera Raja Veera". After that, she recorded a rendition of "Tere Hawaale" for the 2022 film Laal Singh Chaddha. Ghoshal leant her voice to four independent singles composed by Javed - Mohsin in 2023: "Zihaal e Miskin", "Barsaat Aa Gayi", "Jee Bhar Ke Tum", and "Ek Mulaqaat". The former peaked at number three on the Billboard India Songs chart, and was the third-most searched and fifth-most viewed Indian song of the year on YouTube. Next, for the film Adipurush, she recorded a duet with Sonu Nigam called "Tu Hai Sheetal Dhaara". She then featured in the soundtrack of Rocky Aur Rani Kii Prem Kahaani for which she recorded two songs, "Tum Kya Mile" and "Ve Kamleya", both of which earned her Filmfare Award nominations. Rediff's Sukanya Verma, Deccan Chronicle and NDTV listed the former as one of the year's best songs. She also recorded additional versions of the two songs: "Tum Kya Mile (Shreya's Version)", "Tum Kya Mile (Pritam's Version)", and "Ve Kamleya (Redux)". She then recorded a bilingual indie song, "Guli Mata" in which she sang in Hindi and Arabic. The song peaked at number one on the Billboard Arabic Hot 100 chart, number two on the MENA Chart, number two on the UK Asian Music Chart, and number ten on the Billboard India Songs chart. After that, she recorded the songs "Sammohanuda" for the Telugu film Rules Ranjann and "Kalapakkaara" for the Malayalam film King of Kotha, the latter was named one of the best Malayalam songs of the year by Times of India.

Next, she collaborated with Afroto, an Egyptian rapper, on the Coke Studio International song "Sunn Beliya". Later, she and Shekhar Ravjiani worked together on the independent single "Vaari Vaari". "Bolo Na" from 12th Fail, "Jaan Da (Rab Ki Dua)" from Tejas, "Kashmir" from Animal, "Itni Si Baat" from Sam Bahadur, "Tu Jo Hai" from Kadak Singh, and "Main Tera Rasta Dekhunga" from Dunki are some of the songs that Ghoshal concluded 2023 with.

== Concerts, world tours and other activities ==
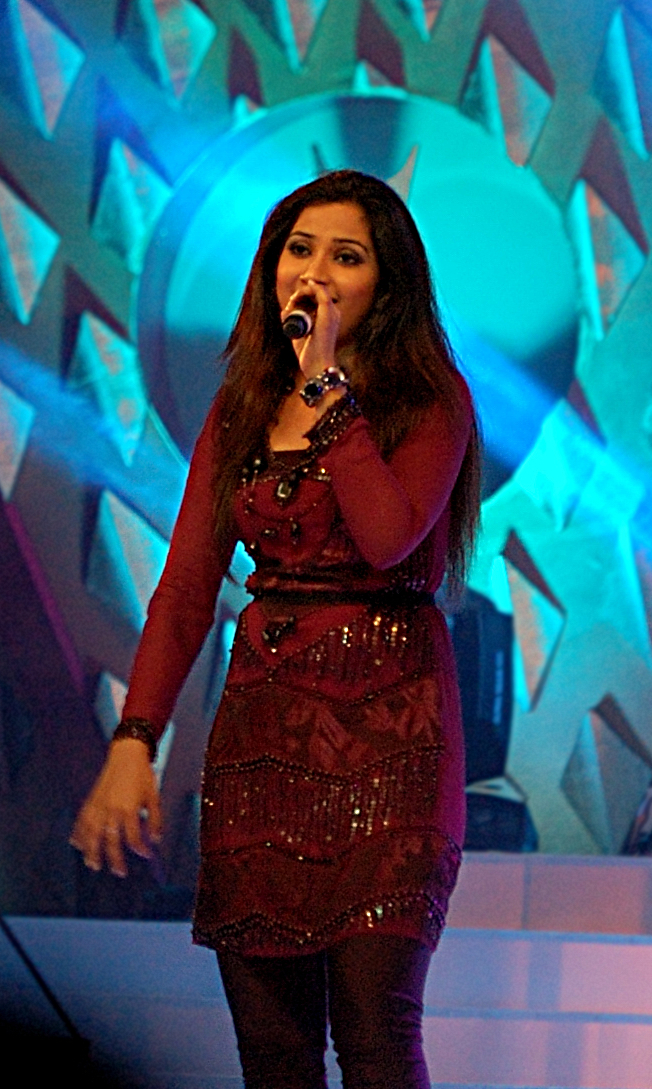
Ghoshal performing at a concert in 2009

Ghoshal performs in musical concerts around the world. In 2013, she went to Australia and New Zealand and gave performances at the Brisbane Convention Center, Dallas Brooks Center in Melbourne, the Sydney Opera House and Vodafone Events Centre in Auckland. In the same year, she performed at the Sharjah Cricket Association Stadium in United Arab Emirates. The same year, she paid her respects to the casualties of an excessive rainfall in Mauritius with a concert at the Swami Vivekananda International Convention Centre in Pailles. Along with Hrishikesh Ranade, she also made a stage performance during the 18th annual day celebration of Airports Authority of India. She made London tours, where she performed twice in the Royal Albert Hall in 2013 and 2014. On the first tour in 2013, she also celebrated 100 years of Bollywood by performing many of the old Bollywood hits songs.

In 2006, along with Sonu Nigam, Sunidhi Chauhan and Shiamak Davar, Ghoshal performed the theme song of 2010 Commonwealth Games at its closing ceremony, as an invitation to everyone to the following Commonwealth Games in Delhi. The same year, she along with Sonu Nigam, recorded the title track "Haath Se Haath Milaa" for the album put together by the BBC World Service Trust as part of an AIDS awareness campaign, where profits garnered through the album, was donated to HIV charities. In 2011, she became the brand ambassador for Joyalukkas jewellery. In 2016, Ghoshal performed a charity event to support a 17-year-old patient of acute lymphoblastic leukemia. In the same year, Ghoshal performed her concert in Sydney Olympic Park. Ghoshal has been performing at the Bangalore Ganesh Utsava every year since 2010.

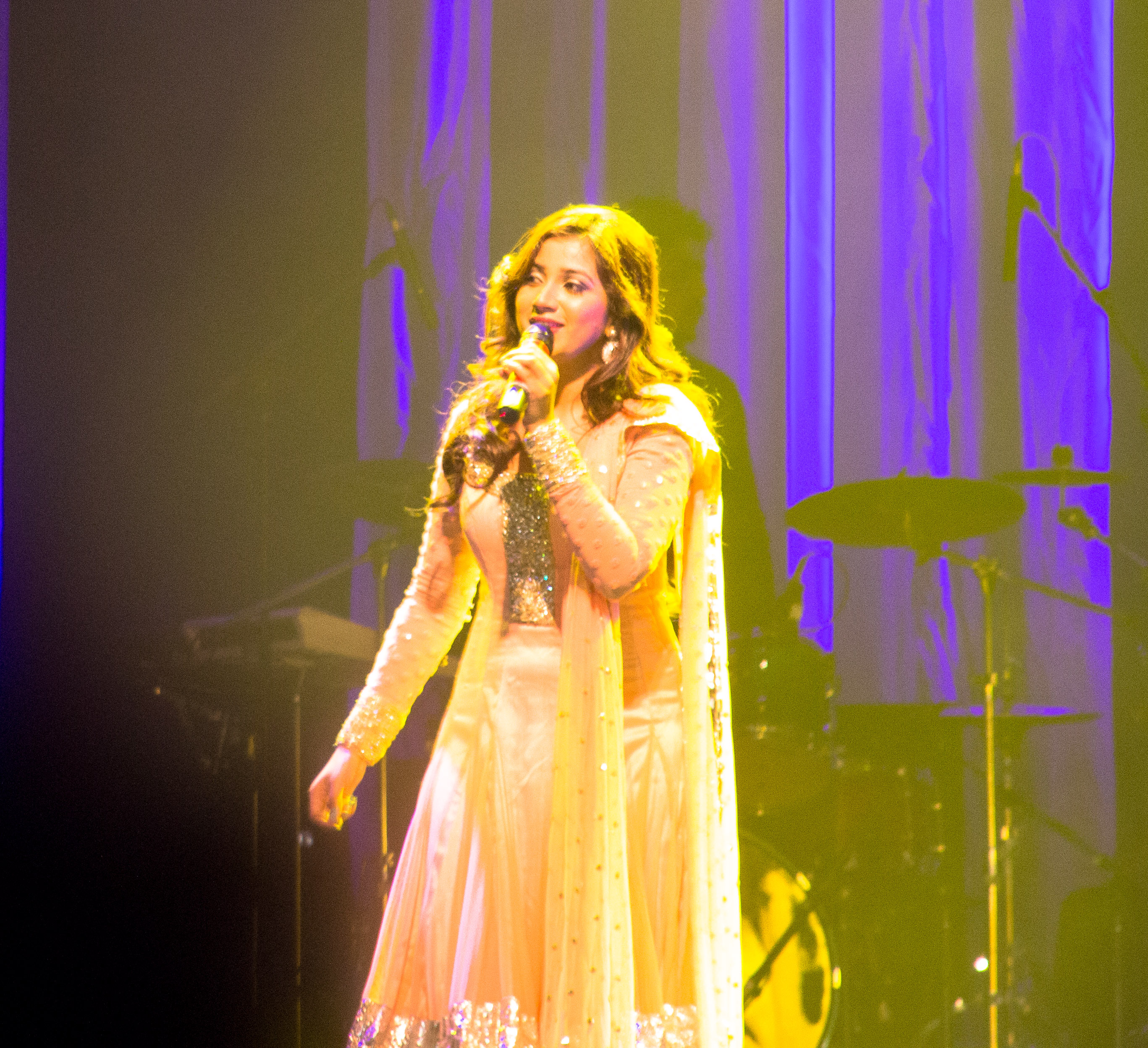
Ghoshal at her concert in Toronto in 2012

During 2017 – 2018, Ghoshal went on a world tour with Symphony Orchestra of India. She performed in several countries including UK, Netherlands, USA, Canada, UAE, etc. During this tour Ghoshal also became just the second Indian artist after Lata Mangeshkar to perform at the Fox Theatre in Detroit. On 30 April 2020, Ghoshal participated in YouTube India's digital event called "One Nation", which raised funds for PM CARES Fund, a public charitable trust to provide relief during the COVID-19 pandemic. Participating in the virtual fund-raising concert "I for India: The Concert for Our Times", on 3 May 2020, she also helped collect over ₹52 crore (US$5.6 million) for India's COVID-19 Relief Fund. On 31 May 2022, Ghoshal performed at an event celebrating "Indore Gaurav Diwas" where she was felicitated by the Chief Minister of Madhya Pradesh, Shivraj Singh Chauhan. In 2022, Ghoshal embarked on another world tour to celebrate her completing milestone twenty years in the music industry. During this tour she performed in various countries including Australia, New Zealand, Ireland, Netherlands and USA. Additionally, she also performed at the Jubilee Stage at Expo 2020 in Dubai, UAE to celebrate her completing twenty years in the music industry. On 26 August 2023, Ghoshal performed at Daman's "Monsoon Festival" where she was felicitated by the state administrator, Praful Khoda Patel. Ghoshal next embarked on her "All Hearts Tour" from September 2023 – March 2024. During this tour, she performed in Mauritius, USA, Canada, India, Qatar, UK and Singapore. While reviewing one of her shows, The Guardian lauded her billowing silk voice and richly varied setlist, and gave the show a four-star rating out of five. On 25 November 2023, Ghoshal performed at Nagpur's "Khasdar Sanskrutik Mahotsav", where she was felicitated by India's Union Minister, Nitin Gadkari. On 16 December 2023, she performed at Karnataka's national-level cultural festival called "Alva's Virasat". Ghoshal headlined the "Ellora Ajanta International Festival" held in Aurangabad on 4 February 2024, with a musical concert.

On 1 March 2024, Ghoshal performed at Nagpur's "Tadoba Festival" to raise awareness regarding wildlife conservation, where she was felicitated by India's Forest Minister, Sudhir Mungantiwar.

On March 23, 2025, Shreya Ghoshal delivered a landmark musical performance at the opening ceremony of the 18th edition of the Indian Premier League (IPL), held at Eden Gardens, Kolkata. Accompanied by an 80-piece choir and a 100-piece orchestra, Ghoshal performed a 15-minute set that included patriotic and cinematic renditions of ten songs -each symbolically dedicated to one of the ten IPL teams — including stirring renditions of "Maa Tujhe Salaam", the title track from Om Shanti Om, "Ghar More Pardesiya" from Kalank, "Kar Har Maidan Fateh" from Sanju etc. She described the event as deeply sentimental, emphasising its cultural significance and her pride in representing India on such a grand stage. The ceremony also featured appearances by Shah Rukh Khan, Disha Patani, and Karan Aujla.

== Artistry and recognition ==
=== Influences ===
One of Ghoshal's earliest musical memories is listening to her mother, Sarmistha Ghoshal, singing classical Bengali songs at clubs. As a very young child, she was introduced to music by her mother, whom she refers as her first "guru". She states that her mother is her best critic.

Ghoshal has mentioned both Lata Mangeshkar and K. S. Chithra as her singing "gurus" and idols and considered them as major influences in her style of singing. She has also acknowledged Asha Bhosle and Geeta Dutt as her inspirations in terms of versatility. She has also named Jagjit Singh as her inspiration to perform songs in the genre of Ghazal.

=== Voice ===
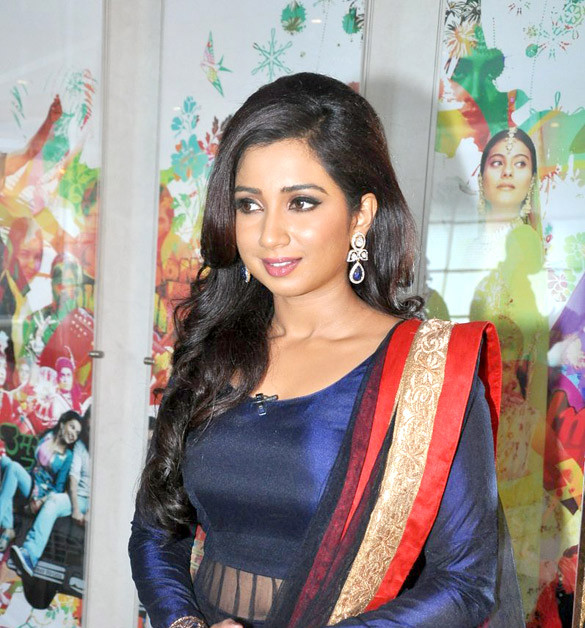
Ghoshal on the sets of Indian Idol Junior, 2013

Ghoshal has performed songs with a lower vocal range. However, Metro Times calls her voice a "sweet and smokey soprano". Her voice has been described as "sweet" with "slight huskiness". The Recording Academy (Grammys) described her voice as "honeyed soprano" and also noted Ghoshal for her versatility. In an interview, Ghoshal noted that her voice has transformed from the "girlish tenor" of the earlier days to a more matured texture. Her voice is characterized in the media for being most suitable for higher-pitched renditions, although some critics have said that her voice tends to screech when she reaches a higher note of scale. Similarly, in the book Confession of a Coward – an Indian Adventure, it was stated that Ghoshal's high-pitched vocals are interesting and impressive, but "certainly take some time getting used to it". Ghoshal has voiced against correcting pitch with Auto-Tune. About her singing and rehearsing style, she has said, "I have a special way of writing the lyrics when it is dictated to me. No matter what the language of the song, even if it is Bengali, I write it in Hindi. I have certain notations and markings to indicate the way it should be pronounced. I feel the Devanagari script is the closest to the phonetics of the language. English letters are not very good for that purpose. Moreover, I listen carefully and try to grasp as much as possible when the lyrics are read to me".

Ghoshal is noted for her wide vocal range, and versatility. What makes Ghoshal remarkable among her contemporaries, according to The Indian Express is, the "serenity in her voice" and the "enviable range". Further complimenting her versatile vocal range, they noted: "The honey-dipped inflection of [her voice], which once put in the recording studio, can turn into naughty, sensuous, serious, sad, comic and pure classical, depending on the requirement of the job". Naming her as the "most versatile singer of this generation", India West remarked the smoothness of her voice when flowing from "lower registers to higher notes". According to The Times of India, Ghoshal maintains the "touch of versatility" with her music by singing different style of songs from classical to pure commercial music. Ghoshal is also noted for her voice quality, expressions and incredible ability to master pronunciation across different languages. Ghoshal has admitted in various interviews that language has never been a barrier when it comes to her craft and she is particular about her diction and expressions in every language she sings. In 2003, Ghoshal admitted that she modulates her voice well, hence "none of the music directors have yet been able to label me". Film Companion described her as the stable sound of female desire and expression in Hindi Cinema.

Ghoshal took vocal lessons and did workshops with Kalyanji Virji Shah, where she learnt the technique about "throw of voice, straight notes, vibratos." She considers classical music training as an asset in playback since it "keeps one's voice fit and fresh." Music director Shekhar Ravjiani praised Ghoshal for her singing versatility. According to Sonu Nigam, the best quality about Ghoshal is that the expressions come perfectly along with mannerisms. Music director and singer M. Jayachandran praised Ghoshal by saying, "It is amazing how she writes down the lyrics in Hindi and then gives her signature nuanced expressions to Malayalam words". During her interviews, Ghoshal mentioned, "I cannot sing double meaning songs or the songs which have vulgar lyrics".

=== Impact and recognition ===
Ghoshal's work has been praised by veteran music composer Pyarelal of the Laxmikant-Pyarelal duo, music directors A.R. Rahman, Ankit Tiwari, Jeet Gannguli, Ghoshal's contemporary singers Papon, Palak Muchhal, Sukhwinder Singh, Bombay Jayashri, Javed Ali, Neha Kakkar, , Arijit Singh Richa Sharma, singers Ghulam Ali, Rahat Fateh Ali Khan, Asrar, A cappella band Penn Masala, film actress Dia Mirza, cricketer MS Dhoni. Film makers Sanjay Leela Bhansali, Vishal Bhardwaj, Karan Johar, and Vidhu Vinod Chopra, have picked Ghoshal as the best female singer from the generation. Canadian singer Nesdi Jones, Indo-Canadian playback singers Jonita Gandhi, Shashaa Tirupati, UK singer Roma Sagar, British Indian singers Tripet Garielle, Ananya Nanda, and actress Alia Bhatt, mentioned Ghoshal as their inspiration.

Usha Uthup named her among the "voice for the future". Veteran singers Vani Jairam and Manna Dey had praised her musical abilities. Senior singers Anuradha Paudwal, Alka Yagnik, Asha Bhosle, Lata Mangeshkar, Sadhana Sargam, Hemlata, Kavita Krishnamurti, Kumar Sanu also picked Ghoshal as the best female singer from the generation. Sonu Nigam mentioned Ghoshal as his favourite singer: "If there'll be best all-time singers, Shreya will surely be included among them". Asjad Nazir, the editor of Eastern Eye called her undisputed queen of playback singing. The Recording Academy (Grammys) cited Ghoshal as a "legend" among contemporary playback singers. Ghoshal is considered as one of the most awarded singers of India. IFFI described Ghoshal as a "generational talent" and one of India's greatest ever singers.

== Media image ==
In 2010, Ghoshal was honoured from the U.S. state of Ohio, where the governor Ted Strickland declared 26 June as "Shreya Ghoshal Day". The first Shreya Ghoshal Day (26 June 2010) was celebrated among her fans on popular microblogging and social networking sites. In April 2013, she was awarded with the highest honour in London by the members of House of Commons of the United Kingdom.

In 2012, Ghoshal appeared in the Forbes Celebrity 100, a list based on income and popularity of India's celebrities. She remained in the top fifty spots for five consecutive years, listed at the forty-second spot in 2012–13, the twenty-eighth spot in 2014, the thirty-third spot in 2015, and the twenty-eighth spot in 2016. In 2013, Forbes India placed her in their "Top 5 Celeb100 Singers and Musicians" list. In 2020, Forbes listed her among Asia's Top 100 Digital Stars. She is the only Indian singer to be listed in the Verve's 50 Power Women Of 2016.

Ghoshal is also known for her style and fashion sense. Ghoshal has said that she has been offered acting roles which she has declined, citing her lack of interest in it. In 2013, the UK-based newspaper Eastern Eye placed her forty-third in their "50 Sexiest Asian Women" list. In 2015, John Cranley, the Mayor of the City of Cincinnati also honoured her by proclaiming 24 July 2015 as "Shreya Ghoshal Day of Entertainment and Inspiration" in Cincinnati. In 2015, it placed her seventh in their "Greatest 20 Bollywood Playback Singers" list. Ghoshal was listed in Eastern Eye's "Top 50 Asian Celebrities" list in 2021 at fifth place, and in 2022 and 2023 at seventh place. She was the top-ranked singer each year. In 2023, India Today featured her in their listing of the 100 most powerful women of India. In 2024, Film Companion featured her in their Power List of Music. She was listed third among the "Top Ten Hottest Female Bollywood Lead Singers" by MensXP.com, an Indian lifestyle website for men.

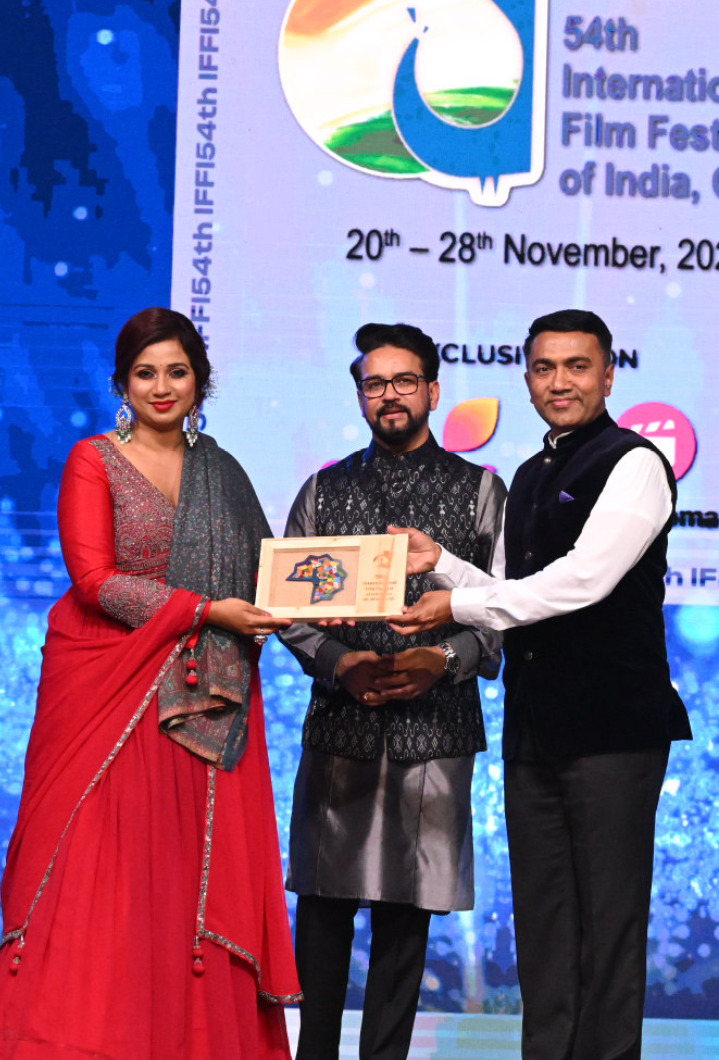
India's I&B and Sports, Youth Affairs Minister, Anurag Thakur and Goa's Chief Minister, Pramod Sawant felicitating Ghoshal at the 54th International Film Festival of India, where she was selected as a member of the 'Grand Jury.'

Ghoshal is active on social media. She is the sixth most liked Indian personality on Facebook and 47th most followed Indian personality on Twitter, according to the statistics of Socialbakers. She is among the top ten most searched Indian singers on Google Search. In March 2017, she became the first Indian singer to have a wax figure of her made for the display in the Indian wing of Madame Tussauds Museum in Delhi. In 2023, Ghoshal was selected as one of the 'Grand Jury' members of the 54th edition of the International Film Festival of India. During her 2024 "All Hearts Tour" in the United States, the City of Austin, Texas mayor Kirk Watson proclaimed June 15, 2024, as the "Shreya Ghoshal Day" for connecting the South Asian diaspora in the city to their homeland through her music. The singer took her Instagram handle to express her joy and gratitude among fans.

Ghoshal is one of the most streamed Indian artists across several music streaming platforms. She was the second-most streamed Indian female artist on Spotify in 2019 and 2020, and the most streamed Indian female artist on Spotify from 2021 to 2025. Additionally, Ghoshal was the most streamed Indian female artist on Apple Music in 2021. She was also the most streamed Indian female artist on Amazon Music in 2022.

== Personal life ==
After ten years of dating, Ghoshal married her childhood friend and current Global Head of Truecaller (for Business) Shiladitya Mukhopadhyaya in a traditional Bengali ceremony on 5 February 2015. On 22 May 2021, Ghoshal gave birth to a son in Mumbai.

== Filmography ==
Ghoshal has appeared as a judge on several television reality shows, and she also appears in music videos.

== Awards and nominations ==
One of the most awarded singers of India, Ghoshal has won five National Film Awards for Best Female Playback Singer, for the songs: "Bairi Piya" from Devdas (2002), "Dheere Jalna" from Paheli (2005), "Yeh Ishq Haaye" from Jab We Met (2007), jointly awarded for two songs "Pherari Mon" from the Bengali film Antaheen (2008) and "Jeev Rangla" from the Marathi film Jogwa (2008) and the fifth one for "Mayava Chayava" from the Tamil film Iravin Nizhal (2021). She has won seven Filmfare Awards: one RD Burman Award for New Music Talent, and six awards in Best Female Playback Singer category for the songs: "Dola Re Dola" from Devdas (2003), "Jaadu Hai Nasha Hai" from Jism (2004), "Barso Re" from Guru (2008), "Teri Ore" from Singh Is Kinng (2009), "Deewani Mastani" from Bajirao Mastani (2016) and "Ghoomar" from Padmaavat (2019). In addition to that, Ghoshal has also won ten Filmfare Awards South for Best Female Playback Singer.

== See also ==
- List of Indian playback singers
