= Arzutraa =

British-Asian singer

- Born: United Kingdom
- Genres: Filmi, dance, acoustic, ambient lounge, romantic, sufi rock
- Occupation: Singer
- Years active: 2010–present

Arzutraa is an international singer based in London, England, who sings in Hindi, Urdu and Punjabi. She became popular after working with producers Atif Ali & DJ Shadow Dubai.

== Early life ==
Arzutraa grew up in Greenwich a suburb of London. Her parents are from Africa and grandparents from India who left India upon the partition of India in 1947. From an early age, she studied instruments, dancing, poetry-writing and singing. In an interview, Arzutraa said that she was discouraged from pursuing music by her parents, who preferred her to concentrate on academics. Her poetry-writing turned into song-writing, and though she claimed never to have set out to be a singer that music had always been important to her. After being praised for her voice, she decided to pursue a music career. Growing up with separated parents, Arzutraa was raised by her mother & older brother. Although she did not live with her father, her Bollywood inspiration came from watching movies with him at a young age.

== Career ==
Arzutraa decided early on that she wanted to sing in Hindi. However she did not know any Indian languages and was advised that she could never sing in the dialect. She spent years studying Indian language and literature, and worked with vocal coaches Chiranjib Chakraborty of India & Nisar Daniel of Pakistan for semi Indian Classical and Victor Asquith of UK for Bel Canto coaching.

Her first single came from music producer Jawad Hyder who composed and produced her debut single "Palkaan in 2014. The song has South American jazz acoustics infused with a Bollywood vibe. She released her second song with JKD, "Aaz Ma Le", an edgy rock funk with Bollywood inspired sound. She did not get the recognition she was seeking until she was introduced to her next producer. Her real break came from working with record producer Atif Ali, who has worked on several Bollywood films and television serials. With her new producer, Arzutraa worked for five years to find her signature style. Whilst working with Atif Ali she launched her debut solo album Woh Pal in 2020. It consisted of nine songs of mixed genres. She has launched five music videos to accompany the album. In 2021, Arzutraa became the only female singer to launch two albums within a year. She launched "Tumhaari" as the lead single for the album 'Tumhaari.'

Arzutraa has also announced her plans to launch her beauty brand 'Arz Organic Beauty' by summer 2021 to follow her passion for hair & beauty which she had from a young age.

== Musical style ==
Arzutraa's greatest musical influences have been Lata Mangeshkar and Shreya Ghoshal from the East. This is evident in her musical works where she has attempted to adopt the Bollywood style in her own music. She has admitted that Shreya Ghoshal is her main teacher when it comes to music. Her main western influence is Mariah Carey. She has managed to garner a classy melodic pop sound.

Her music is Bollywood-inspired. Her debut album Woh Pal has various genres: dance, acoustic, ambient lounge and romantic. Arzutraa has proven her versatile ideas in both her albums 'Woh Pal' & 'Tumhaari' which demonstrate her varied style of music.

== Discography ==
=== Singles ===
Year	Title
2014	"Palkaan"
2015	"Aa Vee Jaa"
2016	"Saathiya"
2016	"Jhoom"
2017	"Kamli"
2018	"Kho Jaaoon"
2018	"Woh Pal"
2020	"Mast Mast"
2019	"Sehraa"
2019	"Zaalim"
2020	"Woh Pal - Official Remix"
2019	"Humsafar - Cover Song"
2020	"Dard Mein"
2020	"Tumhaari"
2020	"Tumhaari Remix by DJ Shadow Dubai"
2020	"Manchali"
2021	"Woh Pal Remix by DJ Shadow Dubai"

=== Albums ===
Year	Title
2020	Woh Pal
2021	Tumhaari
