= Prosenjit Chatterjee filmography =

Indian film actor, producer and television presenter

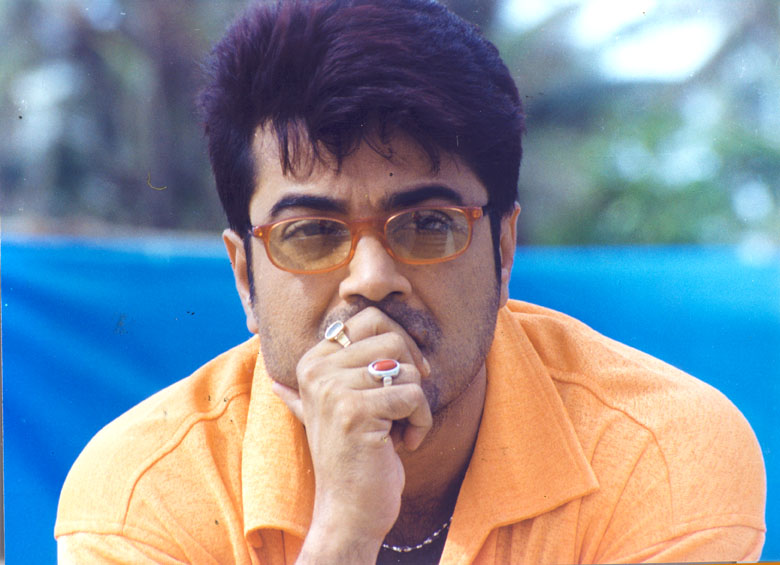
Prosenjit Chatterjee during a photoshoot

Prosenjit Chatterjee is an Indian actor, producer and television presenter, who works predominantly in Bengali and Hindi language films. He debuted as a child actor in the Hrishikesh Mukherjee-directorial Chotto Jigyasa, for which he has won the Bengal Film Journalists' Association – Most Outstanding Work of the Year Award. After a string of films where he acted as a child actor, he made his debut as a lead actor in Duti Pata, which was critically and commercially unsuccessful.

In 1987, Prosenjit's breakthrough role came opposite Vijeta Pandit in Amar Sangi; a highly successful romantic drama directed by Sujit Guha. He made his debut in Hindi cinema with the David Dhawan-directorial Aandhiyan. Following this, he went on to act in numerous commercial films until 2003, when he acted in Chokher Bali. He earned critical acclaim for playing the role of an immobile but emotionally expressive poet in Shob Charitro Kalponik, a famous Bengali actor in Autograph, a poet and folk singer in Moner Manush, a Portuguese-origin Bengali folk poet and his reincarnation in Jaatishwar, a disgraced police officer in Baishe Srabon and a depressed father in Shankhachil.

In 2012, he made a comeback to Bollywood through Shanghai and more recently Traffic. He has won numerous accolades throughout his career, including 7 Bengal Film Journalists' Association – Best Actor Awards, 4 Kalakar Awards and 2 Filmfare Awards East. As a producer, he had won the National Film Award for Best Feature Film in Bengali for Shankhachil. Chatterjee produced the Rituparno Ghosh scripted the critically acclaimed television series Gaaner Oparey, which launched the careers of brothers Arjun Chakraborty and Gaurav Chakraborty and Mimi Chakraborty as well.

In 2016, he debuted in the non-fiction category of television with a 99-episode mini-series, titled Mahanayak. Produced by Shree Venkatesh Films and directed by Birsa Dasgupta, the show starred Paoli Dam, Tanushree Chakraborty and Priyanka Sarkar in other pivotal roles and was based on the life of a superstar of the 60s era – a life fraught with career highs and personal turbulence. Chatterjee has also hosted the family game show Banglar Shera Poribaar with Rachana Banerjee on Zee Bangla.

== Films ==
Key
†	Denotes films that have not yet been released

- All films are in Bengali language, unless otherwise noted.

Year	Title	Role	Notes	Ref.
1968	Chhotto Jigyasha	Bumba	Debut as a child artist; BFJA Awards for Most Outstanding Work of the Year Award	
1969	Rahgir	Basanta Chatterjee	Child artist; Hindi film	
1974	Rakta Tilak	Young Ranadev	Child artist	
1978	Dhanraj Tamang	—N/a	Assistant director (uncredited)	
1980	Dui Prithibi	Young Mrinal	Also assistant director (uncredited)	
1980	Pankhiraj	Henchman	Also assistant director (uncredited)	
1981	Suborno Golok	Dipu	Also assistant director (uncredited)	
1981	Protishodh	Ratan Chatterjee	Also assistant director (uncredited)	
1981	Kalankini Kankabati	Henchman	Also assistant director (uncredited)	
1982	Aparupa			
1983	Duti Pata	Alok	Debut film as lead role	
1983	Agradani			
1983	Jibon Moron		Also assistant director	
1984	Dadamoni			
1984	Pujarini		Special appearance	
1984	Jiban Maran			
1984	Shatru	Bapi	Guest appearance	
1985	Sonar Sansar			
1985	Nilkantha			
1985	Til Theke Tal			
1986	Lal Mahal			
1986	Porinoti			
1986	Jibon			
1986	Atanka	Prabir		
1986	Bouma	Arijit		
1986	Pathbhola	Suman Mukherjee		
1986	Madhumoy			
1986	Prem Bandhan	Ram / Keshto (Note: He played dual roles in the film)		
1986	Teen Purush			
1987	Arpan			
1987	Apan Ghare			
1987	Samrat O Sundari			
1987	Swarnamoyeer Thikana			
1987	Mouno Mukhor			
1987	Amar Sangee	Sagar		
1987	Dolon Chapa			
1988	Protipokkho	Malay Dutta		
1988	Chhannachhara			
1988	Apaman			
1988	Ora Charjon	Joseph		
1988	Chhoto Bou	Tanu		
1988	Aaghat			
1988	Debi Baran	Surajit		
1988	Jyoti	Rabi		
1988	Shudhu Tomari	Jiban		
1988	Nishi Trishna	Paul		
1989	Asha O Bhalobasha	Thakur Bijoy Singha		
1989	Bidaay			
1989	Shatru Pakkha			
1989	Aamar Tumi			
1989	Monimala			
1989	Jojsaheb			
1989	Chokher Aloye			
1989	Nishi Badhu			
1989	Mone Mone			
1989	Aparanher Alo			
1989	Aakrosh	SI Subrata Chakraborty IPS		
1989	Bandini			
1989	Jhankar			
1989	Aamar Sapath			
1989	Amar Prem	Shubho Chowdhury		
1989	Amanat			
1989	Pronomi Tomaye	Prabir		
1990	Agni Trishna	Special Appearance		
1990	Alingan			
1990	Apan Amar Apan			
1990	Mandira	Shantanu		
1990	Badnam	Shankar		
1990	Sankranti			
1990	Bhanga Gora			
1990	Aandhiyan	Vikram / Vicky (Note: He played a single character with different names)	Hindi film debut	
1990	Chetona			
1990	Ladai			
1991	Ahankar			
1991	Proshno	Dr. Soumen Chatterjee / Shomu		
1991	Katha Dilam	Sanjay		
1991	Prem Pujari	Prem		
1991	Palataka			
1991	Meet Mere Mann Ke		Hindi film	
1991	Ek Pashla Bristi			
1992	Rakte Lekha			
1992	Apan Por	Gora		
1992	Surer Bhubane	Special Appearance		
1992	Priya			
1992	Saitan			
1992	Adhikar			
1992	Maa	Amar Chowdhury		
1992	Purushottam	Salim alias Badshah	Debut as director and producer; Also writer	
1992	Pratham Dekha			
1992	Mon Mane Na	Deepak Bose		
1992	Sone Ki Zanjeer	Avinash		
1993	Nati Binodini	Ranga Babu		
1993	Rakter Swad			
1993	Veerta	Amar Rai / Munna	Hindi	
1993	Shraddhanjali	Amit		
1993	Shukher Swarga			
1993	Prithibir Sesh Station			
1993	Ghar Sansar			
1994	Pratyaghat			
1994	Ajana Path	Bikram Chowdhury		
1994	Rawkto Nadir Dhara	Partha		
1994	Nag Panchami			
1994	Rajar Raja	Raja		
1994	Tumi Je Aamar	Rahul Chowdhury		
1994	Bishwas Abishwas	Raja	100th film	
1994	Dhushor Godhuli	Kingshuk		
1994	Nabangsha	Achintya		
1994	Kaal Purush	Anil		
1994	Unishe April	Sudeep		
1995	Sangharsha	Bhombol		
1995	Mohini	Ramen Bose		
1995	Sesh Pratiksha	Akash Chowdhury		
1995	Priyo Shotru		Debut Bangladeshi film	
1995	Jeena Nahin Bin Tere		Hindi film	
1995	Dristi	Amal		
1996	Abooz Mon	Suman		
1996	Bhai Amar Bhai	Amar / Raja		
1996	Jhinuk Mala	Jhinuk		
1996	Biyer Phool	Atanu Mukherjee		
1996	Sakhi Tumi Kar	Sagar		
1996	Lathi	Somnath Mukherjee		
1996	Bidroho	Uttam		
1997	Adorer Bon	Amit		
1997	Moner Manush	Rahul		
1997	Chandragrahan			
1997	Samadhan			
1997	Ajker Santan		Special appearance	
1997	Bakul Priya	Bakul		
1997	Bhalobasha			
1997	Mayar Badhon	Sagar Mukherjee		
1997	Saptami	Soumya		
1997	Tomake Chai	Sagar		
1997	Pabitra Papi	Bhola		
1997	Matir Manush			
1998	Nayaner Aalo	Jiban		
1998	Choudhury Paribar	Rajat		
1998	Aami Sei Meye	Badsha	Second film as director; Cameo	
1998	Baba Keno Chakar	Tushar		
1998	Sagar Banya	Sagar		
1998	Sundari	Partha		
1998	Swamir Adesh	Sunil		
1998	Sindurer Adhikar	Prijay		
1998	Gharer Laxmi			
1998	Ranokhetro	Raja Roy Chowdhury	Also writer	
1998	Mayer Adhikar	Joy		
1998	Aamar Maa			
1998	Praner Cheye Priyo			
1999	Khelaghar	Chanchal		
1999	Agnisikha			
1999	Satyam Shivam Sundaram			
1999	Sei To Abar Kache Ele	Animesh		
1999	Santan Jokhon Shatru	Arun		
1999	Swamir Ghar	Ajoy		
1999	Tumi Ele Tai	Akash		
1999	Dai Daitya	Ranajoy Bose		
1999	Shatru Mitro			
1999	Tomai Pabo Bole	Atanu		
1999	Sindur Khela			
1999	Madhumalati	Madhu		
1999	Sudhu Ekbar Bolo			
2000	Kulangar			
2000	Sajoni Amar Sohag	Bijoy		
2000	Kalankini Badhu	Soumik		
2000	Sasurbari Zindabad	Shomu		
2000	Bhalobasar Chhoan			
2000	Trisul			
2000	Bhalobasi Tomake			
2000	Satruta			
2000	Madhur Milan	Gopal / Babuji		
2000	Ei Ghar Ei Sansar			
2000	Aasroy	Shudhanshu		
2000	Apon Holo Por			
2000	Sapath Nilam			
2001	Utsab	Arun		
2001	Mala Bodol	Jeet		
2001	Guru Shisya	Kishor		
2001	Pratibad	OC Rana Mitra		
2001	Aaghat	Shuvo / Rana		
2001	Sudh Aasul			
2001	Prem Pratigya			
2001	Jabab Chai			
2001	Hatiyaar			
2001	Jamaibabu Jindabad	Sagar Mukherjee	175th film	
2001	Aami Jibonpurer Pathik			
2002	Inquilaab			
2002	Annadata	Shankar		
2002	Phool Aar Pathar	Azad		
2002	Devdas	Devdas Mukhopadhyay		
2002	Streer Marjyada	Pancham		
2002	Shotrur Muqabila	Abhay		
2002	Protihingsha	Jeet		
2002	Sonar Sansar	Raja		
2002	Shiva	Subrata alias Shiba		
2002	Bor Kone	Sandip		
2002	Deva	Dibakar Chowdhury aka Deva		
2002	Kurukshetra	Aagun Chowdhury		
2002	Pratarak	Kumar / Shankar		
2003	Sneher Protidaan	Akash		
2003	Rakto Bandhan	Bijoy		
2003	Rakhe Hari Mare Ke	Hari / Arjun		
2003	Sabuj Saathi	Sabuj		
2003	Andho Prem	Bijoy		
2003	Adorini			
2003	Mayer Anchal	Bhola Chowdhury		
2003	Chokher Bali	Mahendra		
2003	Kartabya	Rajababu		
2004	Anyay Atyachar	Karna		
2004	Agni	ACP Agni Chatterjee	200th film	
2004	Paribar	Sagar		
2004	Surya	Surya		
2004	Tyaag	Bijoy Chowdhury		
2004	Gyarakal	Pradip		
2004	Ram Laxman	Ram Sanyal		
2004	Shudhu Tumi	Rohit		
2004	Sajani	Ashok		
2004	Badsha The King	Badsha		
2004	Pratisodh	Raja		
2005	Sangram	Karna Ghosh		
2005	Baazi: The Challenge	Kashinath		
2005	Dadar Adesh	Bijoy Roy		
2005	Tobu Bhalobashi	Raj		
2005	Shakal Sandhya	Joy		
2005	Rajmohol	Dr. Agni		
2005	Raju Uncle	Raju Uncle		
2005	Criminal	Shiba / Kunal		
2005	Sathi Amar	Raja		
2006	Nayak: The Real Hero	Ananda		
2006	Akai Aaksho	Ratan Chowdhury		
2006	Dosar	Kaushik Chatterjee	National Award for Special Jury Award / Special Mention (Feature Film) in 2007	
2006	Refugee	Shibaji		
2006	Swapno	Ajoy		
2006	Agni Pariksha	Raja		
2007	Kalishankar	Kali		
2007	Sangharsha	Bijay Deb		
2007	Bandhu	Debshankar Roy		
2007	Ami, Yasin Ar Amar Madhubala	Dilip Nath		
2007	The Last Lear	Rajiv	English film; Cameo	
2007	Greptar	DSP Arun Roy		
2008	Hochcheta Ki	Madhu		
2008	Golmaal	Pralay		
2008	Gharjamai	Shibnath		
2008	Khela	Raja Bhowmik		
2008	Takkar	Ajoy		
2008	Shibaji	Shibaji		
2008	Bhalobasa Bhalobasa	Voiceover	Special Appearance	
2008	Mr. Funtoosh	Funtoosh / Palaash		
2008	Swapner Din	Paresh		
2008	Mahakaal	Joy Mukherjee		
2008	Rajkumar	Rajkumar / Raja		
2009	Chawa Pawa	Debdutta		
2009	Aparadhi	Arjun / Akash		
2009	Shob Charitro Kalponik	Indranil Mitra		
2009	Badla	Arjun		
2009	Jamai Raja	Raja		
2009	Houseful	Nikhil		
2009	Mama Bhagne	Raja		
2010	Clerk	Biplab		
2010	Soldier	Brig. Sabyasachi Sen		
2010	Jor Jar Muluk Tar	Bikram Chatterjee		
2010	Hangover	Samaresh Chatterjee		
2010	Autograph	Arun Chatterjee		
2010	Tara	Indra		
2010	Moner Manush	Lalon Phakir	Indo-Bangladesh joint production	
2011	Paapi			
2011	Noukadubi	Nalinaksha Chattopadhyay		
2011	Cholo Paltai	Subhomoy Chatterjee		
2011	Bangla Bachao	Ashutosh Sen		
2011	Baishe Srabon	Prabir Roy Chowdhury		
2012	Prem Bibhrat	Kanchan		
2012	Aparajita Tumi	Pradip		
2012	Shanghai	Dr. Ahmadi		
2012	Bikram Singha: The Lion Is Back	ACP Bikram Singha IPS / Gupi		
2013	Mishawr Rawhoshyo	Raja Roy Chowdhury / Kakababu	Nominated—Filmfare Award Bangla for Best Actor	
2013	Hanuman.com	Anjaniputra Sen Sharma		
2013	Porichoi	Anupam		
2014	Jaatishwar	Hensman Anthony / Kushal Hazra		
2014	Force	ACP Arjun Roy IPS		
2015	Lorai: Play to Live	Sebastian Ryan		
2016	Shankhachil	Muntasir Chowdhury Badal	Indo-Bangladesh joint production; Also producer Filmfare Award Bangla for Best Actor	
2016	Traffic	Dev Kapoor		
2016	Praktan	Ujaan Chatterjee		
2016	Khawto	Nirbed "Dhrubo" Lahiri		
2016	Zulfiqar	Zulfiqar Ahmed		
2017	One	Padma Shri Aditya Sen	275th film	
2017	Yeti Obhijaan	Raja Roy Chowdhury / Kakababu	Nominated—Filmfare Award Bangla for Best Actor	
2017	Cockpit	Capt. Dibakar Rakshit		
2017	Mayurakshi	Aryanil	Filmfare Award Bangla for Best Actor	
2018	Drishtikone	Adv. Jiyon Mitra		
2018	Uma	Himself	Special appearance	
2018	Kishore Kumar Junior	Rajat Ghosh / Kishore Kumar Junior / KKJ		
2018	Bagh Bondi Khela	Adv. Agnideb Roy		
2019	Mahalaya	Shashi Sinha		
2019	Jyeshthoputro	Indrajit		
2019	Gumnaami	Netaji Subhas Chandra Bose / Gumnaami Baba	Filmfare Award Bangla for Best Actor	
2019	Robibaar	Ashimabha	Filmfare Critics Award Bangla for Best Actor	
2020	Dwitiyo Purush	Prabir Roy Chowdhury	Voiceover	
2020	Nirontor	Biplab Sen		
2022	Kakababur Protyaborton	Raja Roy Chowdhury / Kakababu		
2022	Abhijaan	Uttam Kumar	Cameo	
2022	Kolkatar Harry	Police Inspector		
2022	Aay Khuku Aay	Nirmal Mondal / Himself	Nominated—Filmfare Award Bangla for Best Actor	
2022	Kacher Manush	Sudarshan Ghosh		
2022	Prosenjit Weds Rituparna	Himself	Special appearance	
2022	Haami 2	Himself	Special appearance	
2023	Kaberi Antardhan	Arghyakamal Sen		
2023	Shesh Pata	Balmiki Sengupta	Filmfare Award Bangla for Best Actor; Also Filmfare Critics Award Bangla for Best Actor	
2023	Dawshom Awbotaar	Probir Roy Chowdhury		
2024	Ajogyo	Prosen Mitra	50th pairing with Rituparna Sengupta Nominated—Filmfare Award Bangla for Best Actor	
2025	Maalik	Prabhu Das	Hindi film	
2025	Devi Chowdhurani	Bhabani Charan Pathak		
2026	Nari Choritro Bejay Jotil	Narrator	Voiceover	
2026	Vijaynagar'er Hirey	Raja Roy Chowdhury / Kakababu		
2026	Abhhimaan	Akash Chatterjee		
2026	Untitled film with Srijit Mukherji †		300th film	
2027	Bhoyongkar Shundor †	Raja Roy Chowdhury / Kakababu		

== Television ==
=== As actor ===
Year	Title	Platform	Role	Notes	Ref.
2016	Mahanayak	Star Jalsha	Arun Kumar Chatterjee (based on Uttam Kumar)	112 episodes	
2023	Jubilee	Amazon Prime	Srikanth Roy	Debut in OTT	
2023	Scoop	Netflix	Jaideb Sen		
2025	Khakee: The Bengal Chapter	Netflix	Barun Roy		

=== As host and guest ===
Year	Title	Platform	Notes	Ref.
2012	Banglar Sera Paribar	Zee Bangla	Host	
2014	Tumi Je Aamar	Zee Bangla	Co-host with Rachna Banerjee	
2015	Shonge Srijit	Colors Bangla	Guest	
2017	Subho Muharat	Jalsha Movies	Host	
2018–2019	Shubho Drishti	Colors Bangla	Guest; To promote Drishtikone	
2018	Ke Hobe Banglar Kotipoti	Colors Bangla	Host	
2022–2023	Sa Re Ga Ma Pa Bangla 2022	Zee Bangla	Guest; To promote Kachher Manush	
2024–2025	Sa Re Ga Ma Pa Bangla 2024	Zee Bangla	Guest; To promote Ajogyo	

== Music videos ==
Year	Title	Performer(s)	Ref.
2010	Phir Mile Sur Mera Tumhara	Various	

== Documentaries ==
Year	Title	Language	Role	Director
2020	Jhor Theme Jabe Ek Din	Bengali	Himself	Arindam Sil
2020	Panaah	Bengali	Himself	Joydeep Sen
2023	Bird of Dusk	Bengali	Himself	Sangeeta Dutta
