= List of awards and nominations received by Prosenjit Chatterjee =

Prosenjit Chatterjee awards and nominations
Awards and nominations
Award	Wins	Nominations
Government Honours	3	3
National Film Awards	2	2
BFJA Awards	7	7
WBFJA Awards	5	12
Anandalok Puraskar	3	4
Kalakar Awards	8	8
Filmfare Awards East	3	5
Filmfare Awards Bangla	2	6
Filmfare OTT Awards	0	1
Sangeet Cine Awards	1	1
Star Jalsha Entertainment Awards	2	3
MIAAC Film Festival	0	1
Stardust Awards	1	1
Times of India OTT Edition Awards	0	1
Indian Film Festival of Melbourne	1	1
Critics' Choice Film Awards, India	1	1
IWM Digital Awards	2	2
News18 Reel Awards	2	2
OTT Play Awards	1	1
Star Eminence Awards	0	1
ABP Ananda Sera Bangali Samman	1	1
Zee 24 Ghanta Ananya Samman	1	1
Zee 24 Ghanta Binodone Sera 24	0	2
Big Bangla Movie Awards	1	1
Zee Bangla Gaurav Samman	3	3
Senco Gold Swarna Samman	1	1
IBFCA Awards	1	1
Mirchi Music Awards Bangla	1	1
Zee Bangla Sonar Sansar	1	1
Zee Cine Awards	3	3
Tele Cine Awards	3	3
BBFA Awards	1	1
FAFTA Awards	1	1

Totals (Note: Certain award groups do not simply award one winner. They acknowledge several different recipients, have runners-up, and have third place. Since this is a specific recognition and is different from losing an award, runner-up mentions are considered wins in this award tally. For simplification and to avoid errors, each award in this list has been presumed to have had a prior nomination.)
- Wins: 63
- Nominations: 84

This page lists all awards won by the Indian actor Prosenjit Chatterjee.

== Honours ==
Prosenjit Chatterjee has been conferred with the following civilian orders:

- The Padma Shri (lit. 'Lotus Honour') by the Government of India in 2026.

Prosenjit Chatterjee has also been honoured by State governments of India.

- In 2013, the Government of West Bengal honoured Prosenjit with the Mahanayak Samman, given on the memories of Uttam Kumar on his birth anniversary.
- In 2018, Prosenjit was honoured with the Banga Bibhushan by the Government of West Bengal.

== National Film Awards ==
The National Film Awards established in 1954, are administered by the Directorate of Film Festivals, Government of India. Prosenjit has received two awards, one for acting, and one as a producer.

Year	Category	Nominee / Work	Ref.
2006	Special Mention	Dosar	
2015	Best Feature Film in Bengali	Shankhachil	

== BFJA Awards ==
Founded in 1937, the Bengal Film Journalists' Association Awards commonly referred as BFJA, is one of the oldest association of film critics in India. Prosenjit holds the second most BFJA Awards for Best Actor with a total of 6 wins.

Year	Category	Nominee / Work	Outcome	Ref.
1969	Most Outstanding Work of the Year	Chotto Jigyasa	Won	
1999	Best Actor	Tumi Ele Tai	Won	
2000	Best Actor	Daay Dayittwo	Won	
2001	Best Actor	Aasroy	Won	
2001	Best Actor	Utsab	Won	
2004	Best Actor	Chokher Bali	Won	
2007	Best Actor	Dosar	Won	
2013	Most Outstanding Work of the Year	Aparajita Tumi	Won	

== WBFJA Awards ==
Year	Category	Nominee / Work	Outcome	Ref.
2017	Best Actor	Khawto	Won	
2018	Best Actor	Mayurakshi	Won	
2018	Best Actor in a Negative Role	One	Nominated	
2018	Most Popular Actor	Yeti Obhijaan	Nominated	
2019	Best Actor	Drishtikone	Nominated	
2019	Most Popular Actor	Kishore Kumar Junior	Won	
2020	Best Actor	Jyeshthoputro	Nominated	
2020	Most Popular Actor	Gumnaami	Won	
2023	Most Popular Actor	Kakababur Protyaborton	Nominated	
2024	Best Actor	Shesh Pata	Won	
2024	Most Popular Actor	Dawshom Awbotaar	Nominated	
2025	Most Popular Actor	Ajogyo	Nominated	

== Anandalok Puraskar ==
Year	Category	Nominee / Work	Outcome	Ref.
1999	Best Actor	Ranokhetro	Won	
2006	Best Actor	Dosar	Won	
2008	Best Actor	Khela	Nominated	
2011	Best Actor	Moner Manush	Won	

== Filmfare Awards East ==
Year	Category	Nominee / Work	Outcome	Ref.
2014	Best Actor	Mishawr Rawhoshyo	Nominated	
2014	Special Award	—	Won	
2017	Best Actor	Shankhachil	Won	
2018	Best Actor	Mayurakshi	Won	
2018	Best Actor	Yeti Obhijaan	Nominated	

== Filmfare Awards Bangla ==
Year	Category	Nominee / Work	Outcome	Ref.
2021	Best Actor	Gumnaami	Won	
2021	Best Actor (Critics)	Robibaar	Nominated	
2023	Best Actor	Aay Khuku Aay	Nominated	
2024	Best Actor	Shesh Pata	Won	
2024	Best Actor (Critics)	Shesh Pata	Nominated	
2025	Best Actor	Ajogyo	Nominated	

== Filmfare OTT Awards ==
Year	Category	Nominee / Work	Outcome	Ref.
2023	Best Supporting Actor in a Drama Series	Jubilee	Nominated	

== Stardust Awards ==
Year	Category	Nominee / Work	Outcome	Ref.
2013	Best Supporting Actor	Shanghai	Won	

== Indian Film Festival of Melbourne ==
Year	Category	Nominee / Work	Outcome	Ref.
2023	Best Actor in a Series	Jubilee	Won	

== News18 Reel Awards ==
Year	Category	Nominee / Work	Outcome	Ref.
2024	Best Ensemble Cast	Scoop	Won	(Note: Shared both the awards with other cast members)
2024	Best Ensemble Cast	Jubilee	Won	(Note: Shared both the awards with other cast members)

== BBFA Awards ==
Year	Category	Nominee / Work	Outcome	Ref.
2019	Best Actor	Jyeshthoputro	Won	

== FAFTA Awards ==
Year	Category	Nominee / Work	Outcome	Ref.
2020	Best Actor (Critics)	Gumnaami	Won	
