= Pratap Singh Tanwar =

16th-century son of the ruler of Gwalior

Pratap Singh Tanwar was a son of Ramshah Tanwar, the Tomara Rajput ruler of Gwalior. He fought in the Battle of Haldighati (1576) along with his father (Ramshah) and brothers: Shalivahan Singh Tomar and Bhavani Singh as allies of Maharana Pratap against the Mughal army of Akbar.

Pratap Singh Tomar and his son Balbhadr Singh Tomar both were killed in the battle.

He was the chieftain of Ramprasad, the mighty battle elephant of the Mewar army.

== See also ==
- Tomaras of Gwalior
- Shalivahan Singh Tomar
- Battle of Haldighati
