= Gentleman (1989 film) =

- LP Vinyl Records Cover
- Directed by: Vinod R. Verma
- Produced by: B. S. Suri
- Starring: Govinda; Anuradha Patel
- Music by: Bappi Lahiri
- Release date: 28 July 1989
- Running time: 135 minutes
- Country: India
- Language: Hindi

Gentleman is a 1989 Indian Hindi-language action drama film directed by Vinod R. Verma, starring Govinda and Anuradha Patel. It is a remake of Prosenjit Chatterjee's Bengali film Prem Bandhan (1986).

== Plot ==
Identical twins brothers Hari and Om were separated at birth. They both are shocked to meet each other when they have grown up. Shakti is a robber, who made Hari send him to jail because of his crime, when Om was taking care of his family as Hari. Will Om be able to release his twin brother Hari from jail?

== Cast ==
- Govinda as Hariprasad a.k.a. Hari / Omkar (Double Role)
- Anuradha Patel as Devi
- Shakti Kapoor as Shakti
- Nagina Khan as Nagina
- Javed Khan as Master Javed
- Om Shivpuri as Hari and Om's Father
- Yunus Parvez as Kadar Bhai
- Ashalata Wabgaonkar as Durga
- Shiva Rindani as Shiva
- Prem Bedi as Ghulshan Dada
- Yashwant Dutt as Ramsay
- Shamla as Rita

== Music ==
1. "Raste Main Hum Mile, Raste Main Dil Mile, Main Hoon Gentleman" - Bappi Lahiri, Sharon Prabhakar
2. "Taar Hilne Lage, Kahmbe Gadne Lage, Bijali Vala Na Aye" - Shobha Joshi, Udit Narayan
3. "Ba Bablu Ba Bablu, You Are My Girl Friend, Ma Malu" - Bappi Lahiri, Sapna Mukherjee
4. "Chhori Pat Gayi Re, Chakar Chalake Humko Liya Fasaye" - Vijay Benedict, Shobha Joshi
