= Mera Kuchh Saamaan =

"Mera Kuch Saamaan"

Song by R D Burman

from the album Ijaazat
- Released: 1987
- Recorded: Mumbai, India
- Genre: Filmi
- Label: Saregama
- Composer: R D Burman
- Lyricist: Gulzar
- Producer: R D Burman

"Mera Kuch Samaan" (transl. Some of my things) is a Hindi song from the 1987 film Ijaazat, directed by Gulzar, who also wrote the song. The song was composed by R D Burman and sung by Asha Bhosle. In the film, the song takes cue from the poem, Maya (Anuradha Patel) leaves behind in letter, for her former lover Mahinder (Naseeruddin Shah), asking him to return her things. As he read on, he finds they are not physical things she wants back, but memories of times spent together.

The song remains one of singer Asha Bhosle's most popular, and her personal favourite, as in a 2005 interview with The Fader magazine, calling it autobiographical, she said, "Mera Kuch Samaan..This song is my life." In a 2010 tweet, singer Asha Bhosle, noted, "Pancham jokingly referred to song Mera Kuch Samaan as 'Luggage Song'. My band members still call it that when we are on concert tour".

== About the song ==
Even at the time of its release the song was noted, and even "ahead of its times", for its unusual non-rhyming lyrics in free verse, and for blurring the line between poem and lyric. When Gulzar first showed the non-rhyming lyrics to RD Burman, he jokingly complained that Gulzar would next ask him to set a newspaper headline to music. In an interview Asha Bhosle mentioned that when song was presented to R. D. Burnam, he threw the song away calling it Times of India. Gulzar, who wrote the song and was also directing the movie, sat in a corner fearfully. She herself started humming the song which triggered the melody in Burman's mind and he composed the song in 15 minutes.

The soft music composition chosen by RD Burman, kept the focus completely on the vocals and the words, it not only highlight the unusual lyrics, but also brought Asha versatility as a singer to the fore. It pitted Asha in "a league apart from her contemporaries" and made it one of her best songs. She won her second National Film Award for Best Female Playback Singer for the song of 1988, the first one being for Dil Cheez Kya Hai from Umrao Jaan (1981).

Ulhas Bapat, veteran santoor player, who had collaborated with Burman since 1978 until his last film, 1942 A Love Story, played santoor in song's interludes, especially innovative meend pieces.

== Awards ==
Asha Bhosle won the National Film Award for Best Female Playback Singer for her rendition of the song, and Gulzar won the National Film Award for Best Lyrics and Filmfare Best Lyricist Award for his lyrics.

== Legacy ==
Years later, "Mera Kuch Samaan" was the title of the greatest hits album of Gulzar's greatest hits as a lyricist, released in 2005 by Saregama Ltd. It was also part of the greatest hit compilation album, The Very Best of Asha Bhosle, The Queen of Bollywood, released in 2003. The song was also part of the compilation album, "Precious Platinum" released on her 75th birthday in 2008, by Saregama India Ltd.

In May 2011, theatre festival of plays based on 10 short stories of Gulzar, titled Mera Kuch Samaan was organized in Delhi and Mumbai.

== Version ==
Asha Bhosle reprised the song in the album, You've Stolen My Heart: Songs From R.D. Burman's Bollywood with Asha Bhosle, released in August 2005, recorded with Asha and Kronos Quartet, a string quartet founded by David Harrington, as a tribute to Rahul Dev Burman. According to Harrington, .."the experience of a lifetime has tinged her voice with even more poignancy when she sings a song like Mera kuch samaan. The album was recorded over eight days at San Francisco studios, and went to win a nomination for Grammy Award for Best Contemporary World Music Album. Later she said that her favourite number from the album was "Mera Kuchh samaan..which "is very close to my heart as it transports me back into time when I was with Pancham." Young Music composer Ritesh Bhoyar has refreshingly recomposed this song, as per him it is the most difficult lyrics to compose in Indian film industry.
