= Dharm Adhikari =

- Theatrical release poster
- Directed by: K. Raghavendra Rao
- Written by: Rajendra Kishen (dialogues); Indeevar (lyrics)
- Screenplay by: K. Raghavendra Rao
- Story by: Paruchuri Brothers
- Based on: Bobbili Brahmanna (1984)
- Produced by: Uppalapati Surya Narayana Raju; Krishnam Raju (presents)
- Starring: Dilip Kumar; Jeetendra; Sridevi
- Cinematography: K. S. Prakash
- Edited by: D. Venkataratnam
- Music by: Bappi Lahiri
- Production company: Gopi Krishna Movies
- Release date: 11 April 1986
- Running time: 152 minutes
- Country: India
- Language: Hindi

Dharm Adhikari (transl. Judge) is a 1986 Hindi-language action film, produced by U.V. Suryanarayana Raju under the Gopi Krishna Movies banner, presented by Krishnam Raju and directed by K. Raghavendra Rao. The film stars Dilip Kumar, Jeetendra, Sridevi in the pivotal roles and music composed by Bappi Lahiri. The film is a remake of the Telugu movie Bobbili Brahmanna (1984), starring Krishnam Raju, Sharada, Jayasudha, both movies are made by the same banner and director. Two roles of Dilip Kumar and Jeetendra are played by Krishnam Raju in Telugu. In Bobbili Brahmanna, the two lead roles are played by Krishnam Raju (as double role), while in Dharm Adhikari, the two roles are played by Dilip Kumar and Jeetendra.

== Plot ==
Dharamraj is the last word of the law when it comes to his village Nandgaon. After all, one of his ancestors fought back the British, who were defiling the honour of the village's girls and women. The British did kill him, but by treachery. However, his sword became an icon that his descendants have used in their search and delivery of justice to the villagers.

The film begins with residents of another village chasing a man — an apprent criminal — who ends up entering Nandgaon and taking shelter at the home of Shastri, the village temple's priest. The residents of another village complain to the police, and a police inspector tries to enter Nandgaon to apprehend the criminal. Dharamraj tells him to come the next day, and in plain clothes, to witness his brand of justice.

The next day, at Dharamraj's court, it comes to light that the criminal had stolen food to feed his starving family, and is hence forgiven. However, Shastri is punished because he sheltered this man as a criminal, without knowing the mitigating circumstances. Meanwhile, it is revealed that Shastri is aligned with Chaudhary, who harbours ambitions of usurping Dharamraj's powers.Dharamraj has a wife named Savitri, a daughter named Aarti, and a brother named Prakash. Priya and Sudha are the daughters of a villager.

Chaudhary has a mischievous son called Chhote. Sudha loses her voice because Chhote tries to molest her. Dharamraj gives the judgement that Chhote should marry Sudha. This angers Chaudhary further.

Later he learns that Dharamraj is maintaining a widow by visiting her and paying money monthly. He opens the affairs of Dharamraj in front of the villagers, but he fails. On one side, Priya and Prakash are loving each other and on another side, Aarti and Arun, son of the widow who is maintained by Dharamraj, are also. Chaudhary again plays a game and Dharamraj gives the judgement against his daughter that she should marry the same poor villager who lost his eyesight by Aarti. Prakash quarrels with Dharamraj and performs the marriage of Aarti and Arun. Dharamraj becomes ferocious and asks him to leave the village with Aarti and Arun. Savitri goes and performs the pregnancy ceremony of her daughter, on which Dharamraj sends her away from his house. Chaudhary and Shastri are very happy on their success and to end the last scene of their drama, they want to kill Arun and his mother. Prakash comes on the spot and saves them. Dharamraj also joins hands with Prakash. Dharamraj kills Chaudhary and surrenders to the police.

== Cast ==
- Dilip Kumar as Dharamraj
- Jeetendra as Prakash
- Sridevi as Priya
- Pran as Chaudhary
- Kader Khan as Shastri
- Shakti Kapoor as Chhote Chaudhary
- Sujit Kumar as Police Inspector Vikas Kapoor
- Asrani as Kallu
- Rakesh Bedi as Lallu
- Rohini Hattangadi as Savitri
- Dinesh Hingoo as Laal , Shastri's friend
- Shivraj as Gautam, Narayan's father
- Priti Sapru as Sudha
- Anuradha Patel as Aarti
- Gita Siddharth as Susheela
- Dulari as Sarla, Narayan's mother
- Heera Rajagopal as Champa, Susheela's daughter
- Jayshree T. as Chhabili

== Soundtrack ==
Music composed by Bappi Lahiri. Lyrics were written by Indivar.

Song	Singer
"Aankhen Do"	Kishore Kumar, S. Janaki
"Mamla Gadbad Hai"	Kishore Kumar, S. Janaki
"Ek To Kam Zindagani, Us Se Bhi Kam Naujawani"	Shabbir Kumar, Asha Bhosle
"O Patthar Ke Insan, O Neetivaan Insan"	Mohammed Aziz, Asha Bhosle
"Suno Suno Meri Zubaani"	Asha Bhosle

== Production ==
Krishnam Raju considered Vinod Khanna and Dharmendra initially for the lead roles, but later Dilip Kumar and Jeetendra were finalised.
