= Ram Prasad =

Ram Prasad or Ramprasad may refer to:

- Ramprasad Sen, Shakta poet of eighteenth century Bengal
- Ram Prasad Bismil, Indian revolutionary
- Pyarelal Ramprasad Sharma, one of the duo music directors of Laxmikant-Pyarelal
- Ram Prasad (cinematographer), director of photography from Telugu Film Industry
- Ramprasad (elephant) Elephant of Maharana Pratap
- Ram Prasad (politician), MLA for Sagwara (Rajasthan Assembly constituency) since 2018
