= Mahanayak (TV series) =

Indian Bengali drama TV serial

- Promotional image
- Genre: Drama
- Created by: Shree Venkatesh Films
- Written by: Kallol Lahiri
- Directed by: Birsa Dasgupta
- Starring: Prosenjit Chatterjee; Paoli Dam; Tanushree Chakraborty
- Composer: Indraadip Dasgupta
- Country of origin: India
- Original language: Bengali
- No. of seasons: 1
- No. of episodes: 112

Production
- Producers: Mahendra Soni, Shrikant Mohta
- Production location: Kolkata
- Running time: 20 minutes

Original release
- Network: STAR Jalsha
- Release: 27 June – 16 October 2016

Related
- Ramprasad; Mahapeeth Tarapeeth; Tumi Asbe Bole; Kusum Dola

Mahanayak was a Bengali drama television series of 112 episodes that premiered on 27 June 2016, on Star Jalsha. The series starred Prosenjit Chatterjee, Paoli Dam, Tanushree Chakraborty, Priyanka Sarkar, Manali Dey, Biswanath Basu and Biswajit Chakraborty in lead roles. The series is loosely based on the life of megastar Uttam Kumar.

== Plot summary ==
The series promises to chart the life of a superstar of 60's era — a life fraught with career highs and personal turbulences.

== Cast ==
- Prosenjit Chatterjee as Arun Kumar Chatterjee (character based on Uttam Kumar)
- Paoli Dam as Sucharita Sen (character based on Suchitra Sen)
- Mishka Halim as Uma Chatterjee (character based on Gauri Chatterjee)
- Tanushree Chakraborty as Priya Devi (character based on Supriya Devi)
- Priyanka Sarkar as Gayatri Chatterjee (character based on Sabitri Chatterjee)
- Gaurav Chakrabarty as Biswanath Chatterjee (character based on Biswajit Chatterjee)
- Ridhima Ghosh as Urmila (character based on Mala Sinha)
- Sabyasachi Chakrabarty as Satrajit Ray (character based on Satyajit Ray)
- Shantilal Mukherjee as Hemen Mukhopadhyay (character based on Hemanta Mukhopadhyay)
- Bidipta Chakraborty as Saon Debi (character based on Kanan Devi)
- Debdut Ghosh as Chandranath Sen (character based on Dibanath Sen)
- Biswajit Chakraborty as Mr. Sarker (character based on Ashok Kumar Sarkar)
- Biswanath Basu as Kanu (character based on Bhanu Bandyopadhyay)
- Manali Dey as Nibedita Ray
- Ambarish Bhattacharya as Buro (brother of Arunkumar) (character based on Tarun Kumar Chatterjee)
- Sneha Chatterjee as Buro's Wife (character based on Subrata Chatterjee)
- Rupanjana Mitra as Mitra (character based on Sumitra Mukherjee)
- Adhiraj Ganguly as Arun Kumar's son
- Arindam Sil as Tapabrata Sinha (character based on Tapan Sinha)
- Arindol Bagchi as Adhir Sarker
- Oindrilla Sen as Madhumita (character based on Moushumi Chatterjee)
- Surajit Banerjee as Bishwanath Chowdhury
