= Ijaazat =

1987 film directed by Gulzar

- Film poster
- Directed by: Gulzar
- Screenplay by: Gulzar
- Story by: Subodh Ghosh
- Dialogues by: Gulzar
- Based on: Jotu Griha by Subodh Ghosh
- Produced by: R. K. Gupta
- Starring: Rekha; Naseeruddin Shah; Anuradha Patel
- Cinematography: Ashok Mehta
- Edited by: Subhash Sehgal
- Music by: R. D. Burman
- Distributed by: Goldmines Telefilms
- Release date: 11 September 1987
- Running time: 137 minutes
- Country: India
- Language: Hindi

Ijaazat (transl. Permission) is a 1987 Indian Hindi-language musical romance film directed by Gulzar, based on a Bengali story, Jatugriha, by Subodh Ghosh, which had earlier been adapted in Bengali in 1964 as a movie with the same name. Starring Rekha, Naseeruddin Shah, Anuradha Patel in lead roles, the film followed the story of couple who are separated and who accidentally meet in a railway station waiting room and discover some truths about their lives without each other. The film belongs to the art-house genre in India known as Parallel Cinema, and won two National Film Awards in the music category.

A book based on the film titled Gulzar's Ijaazat: Insights into the film by Pakistani author Mira Hashmi was launched in June 2019.

== Plot ==
The film is narrated as a present-day encounter between a divorced couple interwoven with flashbacks of several instances in their marriage. Mahender (Naseeruddin Shah) gets off a train and makes his way to the station waiting room just as it starts to rain heavily. His ex-wife, Sudha (Rekha), is already sitting in the waiting room but he fails to notice her. Upon seeing him, Sudha tries to hide from him but later they accidentally run into each other.

In the first of many flashbacks, Mahender meets Sudha's father figure (Shammi Kapoor) who urges him to consider keeping his vow of marrying Sudha. He had been engaged to Sudha for 5 years but always made an excuse to delay their wedding. Sudha's father figure has already fixed the wedding date and urges Mahender to show up. Mahender meets with Sudha to discuss his ongoing relationship with Maya (Anuradha Patel). Sudha asks Mahender to bring Maya to her (Sudha's) father figure and reveal his intention of marrying Maya instead. Mahender returns to his place for Maya but finds that she has left, leaving him a letter. Later, Mahender marries Sudha and has an amicable relationship with Maya simultaneously. Mahender often speaks with Maya as a friend but wishes to get over her and pursue a normal, married life with Sudha who remains wary of Maya's presence in her marriage. When Maya attempts suicide, Mahender feels guilty and starts spending more time with her. Sudha, not knowing about Maya's suicide attempt and believing that Mahender is being unfaithful to her, feels that her marriage was a mistake, and questions Mahender about his intentions. He then tells her strongly that he is going to bring Maya home to talk to her. Sudha is opposed to this but Mahender leaves nevertheless to bring Maya. However, Maya overhears Mahender and Sudha's arguments on the phone and she leaves before Mahender reaches to pick her up. Returning home without Maya, he finds that Sudha has left as well. Mahender, unable to bear the shock, suffers from a heart attack. Maya nurses him back to health while Sudha stays out of contact with Mahender and continues as a teacher in Panchgani. Later, Mahender feels the that it is time to bring Sudha back home. However, just then, he receives a letter from Sudha stating her intentions to abandon the marriage and cut off all contact with Mahender. After an argument with Mahender, Maya feels estranged at this abrupt change in their relationship and rides off on her motorcycle early in the dawn. Mahender rushes to follow her in his car to stop her. Maya's scarf gets entangled in the rear wheel of the motorcycle, which derails her off the vehicle and she dies from the injuries.

In the present day, after finding out about Mahender and Maya's fate, Sudha is deeply saddened. Just as Mahendra approaches her to ask about her life, her new husband (Shashi Kapoor) enters the room to pick her up. As Sudha's husband leaves the waiting room with her luggage, Mahender asks her to forgive him. She touches Mahender's feet as a plea for his forgiveness and for his permission (Ijaazat) for her to leave him—saying that this was something which she had not received the last time they had separated. Sudha's husband returns to see what is holding her up, recognises Mahender, and smiles at him. Sudha and her husband leave the waiting room and the platform while Mahender hangs back.

== Cast ==
- Rekha as Sudha
- Naseeruddin Shah as Mahendra
- Anuradha Patel as Maya
- Shammi Kapoor as Mahendra's grandfather
- Dina Pathak as Principal
- Sulabha Deshpande as Sudha's Mother
- Shashi Kapoor (Cameo)

== Reception ==
Filmfare wrote about the film, "One of Gulzar's most sensitive films, it also remains Rekha's most poignant performance as the possessive wife, who gives up her husband (Naseeruddin Shah) rather than share him with another woman (Anuradha Patel). Mera Kuch Saaman … can anyone not be moved by it?" According to Lalit Mohan Joshi, author of the book Bollywood: popular Indian cinema, Ijaazat "recreates the tingling sensation of a mature romance. It looks at an unusual male-female relationship, a subject less often broached in Hindi films." Joshi further notes that the film "exudes a sentimental feeling that seems more touching than the recent teenybopper romance stories." M.L. Dhawan from The Tribune, while documenting the famous Hindi films of 1987, commended Gulzar for giving "a mature treatment to the eternal love triangle of pati patni aur woh (husband, wife and the other woman)." He further noted Asha Bhosle for her "soul-stirring voice [which] left an impact" and the principal cast for their "emotion-loaded performances".

== Accolades ==
Award	Date of ceremony	Category	Recipient(s)	Result	Ref.
35th National Film Awards	April 1988	Best Lyrics	Gulzar for "Mera Kuchh Saamaan"	Won	
35th National Film Awards	April 1988	Best Female Playback Singer	Asha Bhosle for "Mera Kuchh Saamaan"	Won	
34th Filmfare Awards	1989 (Note: Filmfare Awards weren't held in 1987 and 1988.)	Best Lyricist	Gulzar for "Mera Kuchh Saamaan"	Won	
34th Filmfare Awards	1989	Best Supporting Actress	Anuradha Patel	Nominated	

== Music ==
The film has four songs, all were composed by R. D. Burman and sung by Asha Bhosle to lyrics penned by Gulzar. The song "Mera Kuch Saamaan" won both writer and singer several accolades with Bhosle winning her second National Award.

Song	Singer
"Mera Kuchh Saamaan"	Asha Bhosle
"Chhoti Si Kahani Se"	Asha Bhosle
"Qatra Qatra Milti Hai"	Asha Bhosle
"Khali Haath Sham Aayi"	Asha Bhosle
