= Raahgir – The Wayfarers =

Raahgir - The Wayfarers
- Official Poster
- Directed by: Goutam Ghose
- Screenplay by: Jagannath Guha; Goutam Ghose
- Story by: Prafulla Roy
- Produced by: Amit Agarwal
- Starring: Adil Hussain; Tillotama Shome; Neeraj Kabi; Omkardas Manikpuri
- Cinematography: Ishaan Ghose
- Edited by: Niladri Roy
- Production companies: Adarsh Telemedia; Nonstop Entertainment
- Release dates: 7 October 2019 (Busan International Film Festival); 20 October 2019 (Jio MAMI Mumbai Film Festival 2019)

Raahgir – The Wayfarers is a Hindi film by director Goutam Ghose. The film stars Adil Hussain, Tillotama Shome, Neeraj Kabi and Omkardas Manikpuri. The film is produced by Amit Agarwal.

Based on a short story by Prafulla Roy, Raahgir is a tale of 3 strangers who meet on their way and develop a bond which is based purely on their kindness and their willingness to sacrifice own basic needs to save human lives. The film highlights importance of human relations and how humanity can survive even in difficult situations.

Raahgir – The Wayfarers had its Festival Screening, World Premiere at Busan International Film Festival 2019 and India Premiere at Jio MAMI Mumbai Film Festival 2019. It was also screened at 25th Kolkata International Film Festival under Maestro section.

== Plot ==
The plot revolves around 3 strangers who meet during a journey. Two of them – Nathuni and Lakhua – are driven by hunger to the nearest town. Nathuni has a paralytic husband and two children, while Lakhua is a loner, perpetually on the fringes of survival. The sheer act of sharing a journey brings them closer. They share their life-stories. While they speak, the monsoon clouds overpower the sky, and they encounter Chopatlal, who is carrying a dying old couple to the hospital. His vehicle is stuck in the mud and no one helps him, till the two come to his rescue. They endanger their own survival, but a sense of purpose propels them to use the last iota of their strength to push the vehicle through mud, impassable in torrential rain. The indomitable spirit that enthuse the marginalized in this story describe another India, hidden deep in the recesses of the sub-continent. An epic journey through relentless monsoon and breathtaking nature.

== Cast ==
- Adil Hussain as Lakhua
- Tillotama Shome as Nathuni
- Neeraj Kabi as Chopatlal
- Omkardas Manikpuri as Nathuni's husband

== Filming ==
Raahgir – The Wayfarers has been filmed in Indian state of Jharkhand. It was extensively shot in Ranchi and Netarhat.

== Release ==
Raahgir – The Wayfarers had its first festival screening at Busan International Film Festival (World Premiere) on 7 October 2019. It was also screened at Jio MAMI Mumbai Film Festival (India Premiere) on 20 October 2019.

== Reception ==
The film received very positive response at Busan international film Festival and Jio MAMI Mumbai Film Festival 2019.

The film was reviewed by Deborah Young of The Hollywood Reporter who wrote – "A slow starter turns into something deeply moving".

Delnaz Divecha of Book My Show writes in her review - " Even in their de-glam avatars, Tillotama Shome and Adil Hussain give applaud-worthy performances in this hard, uncompromising and long-winding drama. Raahgir is not an easy watch but an essential one that brings out the best from its cast of talented actors."
