= Ishaan Ghose =

Indian cinematographer

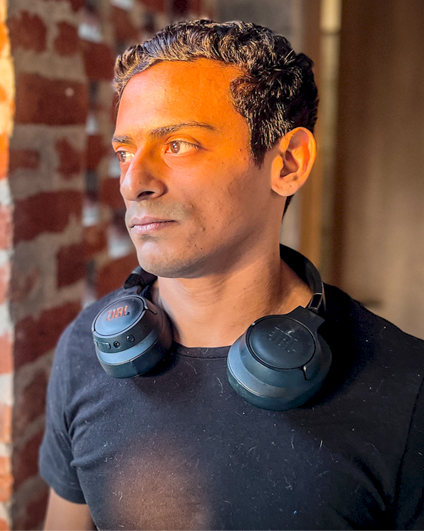
- Years active: 2003–present
- Known for: Director, Producer, Cinematographer
- Notable work: Jhilli
- Father: Goutam Ghose

Ishaan Ghose is an Indian film director, editor, writer and cinematographer from West Bengal, India. He is the son of an Indian filmmaker Goutam Ghose who works primarily in Bengali cinema.

== Early life ==
Ishaan Ghose was born to an Indian filmmaker Goutam Ghose and costume designer Neelanjana Ghose.

== Career ==
He started working as a camera assistant in 2011 and continued till 2015, when he filmed documentaries till, he got his first chance to work independently with his father's Indo-Bangladesh co-production Shankhachil. In 2016, he and his sister Anandi began documenting the ragpickers in the Tiljala area for an NGO. They photographed them and spent a lot of time with them, but they had to stop because the NGO was having legal problems. It took him 12 years till he felt he had the confidence to step into direction independently. He frequently worked as an assistant or the cinematographer's assistant on documentaries, commercials, and feature films before plunging into the world of cinematic creativity and directed Jhilli. Filmmaking style influenced by Goutam Ghose, Terrence Malick, Wong Kar-wai.

== Filmography ==
Year	Title	English title	Director	Producer	Cinematographer	Language	Ref
2016	Shankhachil	Conch Shell	No	No	Yes	Bengali	
2019	Raahgir	The Wayfarers	No	No	Yes	Hindi	
2021	Jhilli	Discards	Yes	Yes	Yes	Bengali	
2023	Stolen	N/A	No	No	Yes	Hindi	
2025	Parikrama	The Wayfarers	No	No	Yes	Italian; English; Hindi	
2026	Marichika	Mirage	Yes	Yes	Yes	Bengali	

== Awards ==
Year	Film	Category	Occasions	Remarks	Ref
2016	Shankhachil	Best Cinematography	Filmfare Awards East	Nominated	
2022	Jhilli	Innovation in Moving Images Best Film	Kolkata International Film Festival	Won	
2022	Jhilli	INT'L Narrative Feature	Mammoth Lakes Film Festival	Honorable Mention	
