= Ramshah Tomar =

- Raja of Gwalior

10th Maharaja Tomar of Gwalior
- Reign: 1526-1576 (Reign from exile)
- Predecessor: Vikramaditya Tomar
- Successor: Akbar as (Mughal Emperor)
- Born: 1521; Gwalior
- Died: 1576 (aged 54–55); Rakt Talai, Khamnore, Rajasthan
- Issue: Shalivahan Singh Tomar; Pratap Singh Tanwar; Bhavani Singh Tomar (sons)
- Dynasty: Tomara (Gwalior)
- Father: Vikramaditya Tomar
- Religion: Hinduism

Ramshah Tomar (born Ram Singh Tomar or Ramshah Tanwar) famously known as "Shaho ka Shah" or (King of Kings) was the last Tomara Rajput king of Gwalior. He was ousted by Akbar and sought refuge at his maternal home in Mewar which at the time was the only state offering resistance to Akbar. Owing to his valour, Udai Singh gave him the title of "Shaho Ka Shah" and also married one of his daughter to Ramshah's son Shalivahan Singh Tomar.

== Early life and accession ==
Ramshah was born to Vikramsimha or Vikramaditya Tomar of Gwalior in 1521. Vikramaditya died in the first battle of Panipat fighting with Babur in 1526. Ramshah around the age of 6 and under guardianship of Dhurmangad declared independence from Lodis and made a plan to capture the Gwalior fort. He led seize of Gwalior Fort and started harassing Tatar Khan a lodi appointed Governor of Gwalior to declare him as master of Gwalior. Tatar Khan declared Ramshah as the new Maharaja of Gwalior but later flipped side when the Mughal ruler Babur reached Agra, and Tatar Khan decided to accept his suzerainty. subsequently, foiled Dhurmangad's and Ram shah's attempt to capture the fort. In 1542, Sher Shah Suri captured the fort, and Ram Shah became his ally.

After, the death of Islam Shah Suri, in 1554, the fort was controlled by the Suri appointed Governor Bahbal Khan. In 1556, Bahbal Khan, facing a Mughal invasion, decided to sell the fort to Ram Shah. Ram Shah took control of the fort.

The forces of Ramshah Tomar and Mughal emperor Akbar met in 1556, after a prolonged battle Ramshah was defeated.

Akbar asked him to surrender but Ramshah did not accept the suzerainty of Mughals as the head of the state. After realizing this Akbar ousted Ramshah and his sons from Gwalior.

Battle of Haldighati

Ramshah Tomar became a trusted senior general and defense advisor to Maharana Pratap of Mewar, he promised Ramshah that he will help him getting back Gwalior from Mughals. Ramshah also had experience in facing Mughal army in battlefield which makes him class apart from his counterparts.

Maharana Pratap decided to position him in haraval's (front row) right wing directly facing the strongest contingent of Mughals i.e., the Sayyids led by Sayyid Hashim of Barha followed by vanguards and Kacchawa Rajputs. The Mahrana Pratap's right-wing was 500-strong and was led by Ramshah Tomar, the erstwhile king of Gwalior, and his three sons namely Salivahan Singh Tomar, Pratap Singh Tomar, and Bhavani Singh Tomar accompanied by Maharana Pratap's minister Bhama Shah and his brother Tarachand along with Pratap Singh Tomar's son and Ramshah's grandson Balbhadr Singh Tomar.

Abd al-Qadir Badayuni, a Mughal historian who fought against Ramshah in the Battle of Haldighati praised him in his book as follows -

"I saw that the warrior left the battle of the elephants on the right and reached the main part of the Mughal army and carried out dangerous manslaughter there. Ramshah, the grandson of the famous Raja Man Singh of Gwalior, who always remained in Rana's Haraval (front row), showed such valor which is beyond the power of writing. Due to his powerful attack on Man Singh kachwaha on the left side of Haraval had to flee and take shelter of the Sayyids of the right side, which also caused Asaf Khan to flee. If the Sayyid people had not survived at that time, then the runaway army of the Haraval (front row) had created such a situation that we would have faced a shameful defeat."

Abul fazl, the grand Vizier of Akbar who wrote Akbarnama wrote -

"These two (Ramshah & Shalivahan) were friends of war and enemies of life, who had made life cheap and honour expensive. Battling with valour, Ramshah, his three sons - Shalivahan Singh, Bhavani Singh, Pratap Singh, a grandson - Balbhadr and 300 of his Tomar followers were all martyred. Not a single brave man of the Tanwar clan survived the war."

Owing to their Valour and devotion, Two Chhatris (Memorials) were made by Maharana Karan Singh (grandson of Maharana Pratap) in Rakt Talai for Ramshah Tomar and Shalivahan Singh Tomar.

== Tomar Rulers of Gwalior ==
Tanwar dynasty of Gwalior who were Descendants of Sohan Singh s/o Anangpal Tanwar, the ruler of Delhi in the 12th century.

1. Virsimha Dev (Virsingh Deo) (1394-1400)
2. Uddhharana Dev (1400-1402)
3. Virama Dev (Biram Deo) (1402-1419)
4. Ganapati Dev (1419-1425)
5. Dungarsimha (Dungar Singh) (1425-1459)
6. Kirtisimha (Kirti Singh) (1459-1479)
7. Kalyanmal (Kalyanmalla) (1479-1486)
8. Manasimha (Man Singh) (1486-1516)
9. Vikramsimha (1516 -1523)
10. Ramshah Tanwar, (born 1521) (1526-1576) died in the battle of Haldighati.

=== Lineage & Descendants ===
___________________________________________________________________________________________________________

Ramshah Tomar has 3 sons:

1. Salivahan Singh Tomar
2. Pratap Singh Tomar
3. Bhavani Singh Tomar

Salivahan Singh Tomar, (born 1542 -1576) married a daughter of Udai Singh II of Mewar. He died in the battle of Haldighati along with his brothers Pratap Singh and Bhavani Singh.

Salivahan Singh Tomar has 3 sons:

1. Shyamshah Tomar
2. Mitrasen Tomar or Mitra Singh
3. Rao Dharmagat

Shyamshah Tomar, heir apparent to the throne of Gwalior, took service under Akbar after Maharana Pratap's demise in 1597 AD.Later on, his descendants were given Thikanas in Lakhansar (Bikaner), Khetasar and Kelawa (Jodhpur) and Dalniya (Jaipur).

Pratap Singh's son Balbhadr Singh Tomar died in the battle of Haldighati alogside with his uncle Salivahan and grandfather Ramshah.
