= Jhilli =

2021 Indian Bengali-language film

- Directed by: Ishaan Ghose
- Written by: Ishaan Ghose
- Produced by: Goutam Ghose Ishaan Ghose
- Starring: Bitan Biswas, Shombhunath De, Sayandeep Guha, Aranya Gupta, Sourav Nayak
- Cinematography: Ishaan Ghose
- Edited by: Ishaan Ghose
- Music by: Soumajit Ghosh, Rajarshi Das
- Release date: 29 November 2021 (Italy)
- Running time: 93 minutes
- Country: India
- Language: Bengali

Jhilli (transl. Discards) is a Bengali language film written and directed by Ishaan Ghose in 2021 and produced by Goutam Ghose Associates. The film is about a boy named Bokul who resolves to make changes in his life after realizing that most of his friends are leaving him behind in the debris of discards.

== Plot ==
Bokul, a fourth-generation manual laborer, toils in the largest trash yard in Kolkata at a facility that crushes bones. He makes the most of his existence in his environment while being unaware of his difficulties. He has no idea that the outside world is transforming quickly and preparing for a new economic boom. His entire world was exchanged for a recreation area.

== Cast ==
- Bitan Biswas as Ganesh
- Shombhunath De as Shombhu
- Sayandeep Guha as Guddu
- Aranya Gupta as Bokul
- Sourav Nayak as Chompa

== Production ==
The film was shot with a Sony a7sii camera and one lens – a Canon 16-35mm – on a hand-held stabilizer. With the lack of sound equipment, the sound was recreated completely in post-production with Aneesh Basu, which took a year during the pandemic. This was a self-funded production which had no shooting script and was heavily improvised.

== Awards ==
Year	Awards	Category	Result	Ref
2022	Kolkata International Film Festival	International Competition: Innovation in Moving Images Best Film | Golden Royal Bengal Tiger Award	Won	
2022	Mammoth Lakes Film Festival	INT'L Narrative Feature	Honorable Mention	
2023	69th National Film Awards			
2023	Torino Film Festival		Premier	
BFJA	2023		Best Debut Director, Best Cinematography	
Filmfare Award	2023			

== Reception ==
- There is hardship and suffering, but there is also a sense of belonging that is unmatched elsewhere. Nothing about Jhilli is fictitious. The existence of those among us who have been stripped off their identities and denied access to necessities of life. In this film, the protagonists are denied the opportunity to discover who they are. Instead, all they want is to live.
- Ghose's film reveals a delirious and slurred story of a group of pals that drift in and out of each other's lives as they try to earn a livelihood from Dhapa or come up with wacky escape plans that are doomed to failure in this dystopian terrain.
