= Rukhsat =

- Directed by: Simi Garewal
- Produced by: Philip Cherian
- Starring: Mithun Chakraborty; Anuradha Patel; Amrish Puri; Pradeep Kumar; Rohini Hattangadi
- Music by: Kalyanji Anandji
- Release date: 10 June 1988
- Running time: 135 minutes
- Country: India
- Language: Hindi

Rukhsat is a 1988 Indian Hindi-language romantic film directed by Simi Garewal, starring Mithun Chakraborty, Anuradha Patel, Marc Zuber, Pradeep Kumar, Rohini Hattangadi and Amrish Puri.

== Cast ==
- Mithun Chakraborty as Arjun Rai
- Anuradha Patel as Sapna Sehgal
- Marc Zuber as Gautam Sehgal
- Simi Garewal as Radha Talwar
- Amrish Puri as Jagdish Chopra
- Pradeep Kumar as Sapna's dad
- Rohini Hattangadi as Sapna's bua
- Tom Alter as New York Police Capt Morris

== Soundtrack ==
| # | Title | Singer(s) |
|---|---|---|
| 1 | "Naam-E-Ali Bolo" | Kishore Kumar |
| 2 | "Diwana Main Hoon Tera" | Kishore Kumar, Sadhana Sargam |
| 3 | "Diwana Main Hoon Tera" (Sad) | Kishore Kumar |
| 4 | "Tera Mera Pyar Amar" | Suresh Wadkar, Sadhana Sargam |
| 5 | "Wafa Mere Dil Ki" | Suresh Wadkar |
| 6 | "O Sanam Tere Siva Apna" | Sadhana Sargam |
| 7 | "Music (Rukhsat)" | instrumental |
