= Jyoti (1988 film) =

- Theatrical release poster
- Directed by: Shabda Kumar
- Produced by: Asis Ray
- Starring: Prosenjit Chatterjee; Anuradha Patel; Rameshwari
- Music by: Sapan-Jagmohan
- Distributed by: Angel Video
- Release date: 1988
- Running time: 2:01:21
- Country: India
- Language: Bengali
- Budget: 3 Lakhs
- Box office: 3.50Lakhs

Jyoti (transl. Light) is a 1988 Bengali-language romantic drama film directed by Shabda Kumar and produced by Asis Ray. The film features actors Prosenjit Chatterjee, Anuradha Patel, and Rameshwari in the lead roles. The music was composed by Sapan-Jagmohan. This film also dubbed in Hindi as Amber, though the dubbed version was not released till now, still the album was released in Hindi in 1985, 3 years before release of the original (Bengali).

== Cast ==
- Prosenjit Chatterjee
- Anuradha Patel
- Rameshwari
- Pradeep Kumar
- Utpal Dutt
- Tarun Kumar
- Rakesh Bedi
- Chand Usmani

== Soundtrack ==
Songs of this film are very popular. Lyricist Gouri Prasanna Majumder and Pulak Banerjee.

Bengali

Jyoti

Soundtrack album by Sapan-Jagmohan

All music is composed by Sapan-Jagmohan.

Songs
No.	Title	Playback	Length
1.	"Dhua Dhua"	Kishore Kumar	5:00
2.	"Chhotto Ekta Bhalobasa"	Asha Bhosle	5:00
3.	"Chokhe te Shawon gaye gungun"	Kishore Kumar
4.	"Na Pele Baba Poner Taka"	Mohammad Aziz
5.	"Aaj Mon Fagun Ke Chunte Chaye"	Asha Bhosle
6.	"Ebar Aami Jai Je Chole"	Mohammad Aziz

Hindi (Dubbed)

Lyricist Mahendra Dehlvi, Gauhar Kanpuri and Shabda Kumar.

Amber

Soundtrack album by Sapan-Jagmohan

All music is composed by Sapan-Jagmohan.

Songs
No.	Title	Playback	Length
1.	"Dekha Jo Maine"	Kishore Kumar
2.	"Kal Ka Har Sapna Hamain"	Asha Bhosle
3.	"Jhilmil Sitaron Se Naina"	Kishore Kumar
4.	"Kab Talak Dulhe"	Mohammad Aziz
5.	"Aaj Hum Taron Se Khelenge"	Asha Bhosle
6.	"Teri Rah Main Ek Deepak Jalakar"	Mohammad Aziz
