= Nirontor (2020 film) =

2019 Bengali drama film

The Prologue
- Bengali: Nirontor
- Directed by: Chandrasish Ray
- Written by: Chandrasish Ray
- Produced by: Prosenjit Chatterjee
- Cinematography: Soumik Haldar
- Music by: Avijit Kundu
- Production company: Nideas Production
- Distributed by: Zee5
- Release dates: October 2019 (MAMI); 28 June 2020
- Country: India
- Language: Bengali

The Prologue (Bengali: Nirontor) is a 2019 Bengali drama film directed by Chandrasish Ray and produced by Prosenjit Chatterjee. The film premiered through Zee5 on 28 June 2020.

== Plot ==
Director Chandrasish Ray tries to explore themes of life, and the solitude and responsibilities it often entails. However woeful things may seem, life goes on, and it's futile to stop and complain, Ray argues. The story follows a group of people who are in search of a virgin location to set up a resort in an exotic, remote mountain area. The main characters, Biplab and Bhaskar, are in Nepal to finalize the contract of acquiring a plot of land. Biplab is often irritated at Bhaskhar's presence, sometimes without a clear reason. They frequently engage in squabbles and quarrels over petty issues, such as eating pork without permission or obsession with their mobile phones. Bhaskar is shown in a new light, as he tries to show Biplab the reality of this age where it is too easy to stay connected with anyone and that affects relationships. The two men with different personalities gradually form a bonding to introspect their "selves". Bhaskar reveals he is married, and his wife Jonaki (Ankita Majhi) has suffered a miscarriage. He expresses his dejection at nobody being there for him, although he fulfils everything expected of him. After returning from the trip, Biplab decides to stay at home for a while and look after Jonaki himself. His loneliness is reflected from his sightings of a couple who go for a walk at night, cleaning his books, discovering a book meant for the householder. Only this time, their voices and conversation can be clearly heard from behind the camera.

== Cast ==
- Prosenjit Chatterjee as Biplab Sen
- Satyam Bhattacharya as Bhaskar
- Ankita Majhi as Jonaki
- Pranay Narayan as Michael
- Poonam Gurung as Binsa
- Nima Norbu Lama as Ben
- Ekavali Khanna as Nandini

== Release ==
The film premiered in India story section of Mumbai Film Festival 2019

The film was released through Zee5 on 28 June 2020.

== Reception ==
The film received positive feedback and appreciation from other filmmakers. The Times of India rated the movie 3.5 out of 5 stars.
