= Anuradha Patel =

Indian actress (born 1961)

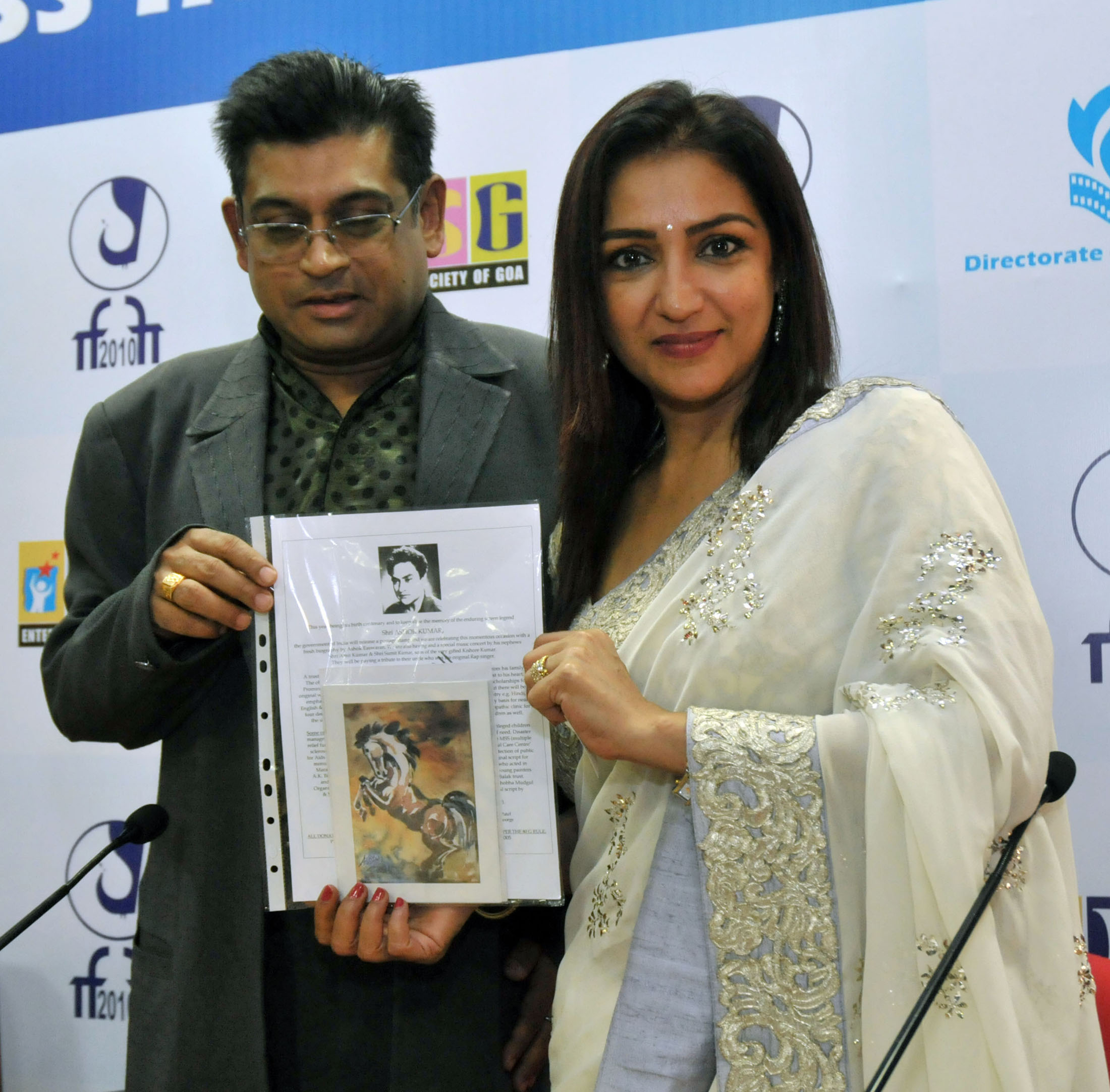
- Patel with her uncle, Amit Kumar, at an event
- Born: 30 August 1961 (age 65); Bombay, Maharashtra, India
- Occupation: Actress
- Spouse: Kanwaljit Singh (m. 1988)
- Children: 2
- Relatives: Ganguly Family

Anuradha (Note: alternative spelling: Anooradha) Patel (pronunciation: ənʊˈraːdʱə pəˈtɛl; born 30 August, 1961) is an Indian film and television actress, most known for portraying Maya in Ijaazat (1987).

== Early life and background ==
Anuradha Patel was born into the Ganguly family on 30 August, 1961 in Bombay (now Mumbai) in Maharashtra, to Dr Veerendra Patel, an orthodontist, and Bharati Jaffrey, an actress and the daughter of veteran actor, Ashok Kumar. Actor Anoop Kumar and renowned singer Kishore Kumar were her grand-uncles.

Her mother later married Hamid Jaffrey, the brother of veteran actor Saeed Jaffrey.

She has two brothers, Rahul, a fashion photographer and Rohit. She has a half-brother, Sahil, and two step-sisters, Shaheen and Genevieve. Genevieve is the mother of actress Kiara Advani, who played Patel's titular daughter in Satyaprem Ki Katha.

She was educated at the St. Xavier's College, Mumbai and studied interior design for six months at Nirmala Niketan College.

== Career ==
Patel made her film debut in the 1983 film Love in Goa paired opposite former child actor Mayur Verma. She went on to appear in successful films like Utsav (1984), Phir Aayee Barsat (1985), Dharm Adhikari, Sadaa Suhagan (1986), Ijaazat (1987), and Rukhsat (1988).

But then she did not get lead roles in films from 1989 and chose to do Television and advertisements. She took a hiatus from acting from the early 1990s to focus on her family and sons, yet continued her career in modelling. After a 10-year break, she returned to films in the late 2000s, appearing in films like Jaane Tu Ya Jaane Na (2008) Khaap with Om Puri, Ready (2011) Aisha, Dhantya Open and more.

Apart from being an actor, she is also the director of Dynamic Finishing Academy.

== Personal life ==
After a courtship of seven or eight years she married actor Kanwaljit Singh on 13 April 1988.

They have two sons and a goddaughter.

== Filmography ==
=== Films ===
All films are in Hindi, unless otherwise noted.

Year	Title	Role	Notes	Ref.
1983	Love in Goa	Marina D'Souza	Debut	
1984	Utsav	Aditi	Charudatta's wife	
1984	All Rounder	Poonam	Vikram's girlfriend	
1985	Phir Aayee Barsat	Anuradha "Annu" Raazdaan		
1985	Bandhan Anjana			
1985	Anantyatra	Shakuntla	Girl in the dream	
1985	Paththar	Mrs Gomti Resham Singh		
1985	Jaan Ki Baazi	Sundari		
1986	Dharam Adhikari	Aarti		
1986	Sadaa Suhagan	Madhu	Ravi's wife	
1986	Duty	Radha		
1987	Kaun Kitney Pani Mein			
1987	Ijaazat	Maya	Nominated — Filmfare Award for Best Supporting Actress	
1988	Rukhsat	Sapna Sehgal		
1988	Tohfa Mohabbat Ka			
1988	Dayavan	Shama		
1988	Gharwali Baharwali	Kala Mehra		
1988	Jyoti			
1989	Mera Naseeb			
1989	Ina Mina Dika	Sonika	Special appearance; Marathi film	
1989	Apne Begaane	Bandini		
1989	Gentleman	Devi		
1990	Lohe Ke Haath	Gayatri		
1991	Deewane			
1992	Benaam Rishte			
1993	Manvini Bhavai	Raju Patel	Gujarati film	
2003	Tujhe Meri Kasam	Mrs Khanna	Anju's mother	
2006	Hamari Beti			
2007	Dus Kahaniyaan	Aman's mother	Anthology film; Segment: "Lovedale"	
2008	Jaane Tu... Ya Jaane Na	Vishakha "Pumpkin" Mahant	Aditi's mother	
2010	Aisha (2010)	Chitra Kanwar Singh	Aisha's aunt; inspired from Mrs Weston in Emma	
2011	Ready	Sumitra Kapoor	Prem's mother	
2011	Khap	Komal M. Chaudhary	Madhur's wife	
2013	Rabba Main Kya Karoon	Gunjan		
2020	It's My Life	Gayatri Sharma	Abhishek's mother; delayed release	
2021	Tuesdays and Fridays	Nimmi Sarin	Varun's mother	
2022	Radhe Shyam	Madhuri Chakravarthy	Prerana's mother	
2023	Satyaprem Ki Katha	Rasna Kapadia	Katha's mother	

=== Television ===
Year	Title	Role	Notes	Ref.
1985–1986	Chhapte Chhapte			
1986	Katha Sagar		Episode: "Tarannum"	
2004	Dekho Magar Pyaar Se	Sarika Sareen	Cameo	
2005	Kyunki Saas Bhi Kabhi Bahu Thi	Bharti Jitesh Kothari	Cameo with Jeetendra	
2017	Sher-e-Punjab: Maharaja Ranjit Singh	Mai Vajero	Nursemaid of Maharaja Ranjit Singh	

== Awards and nominations ==
Year	Award	Category	Work	Result	Ref.
1989 (Note: Filmfare Awards weren't held in 1987 and 1988.)	Filmfare Awards	Filmfare Award for Best Supporting Actress	Ijaazat (1987)	Nominated	
