= Prosenjit Chatterjee =

Indian film actor and producer (born 1962)

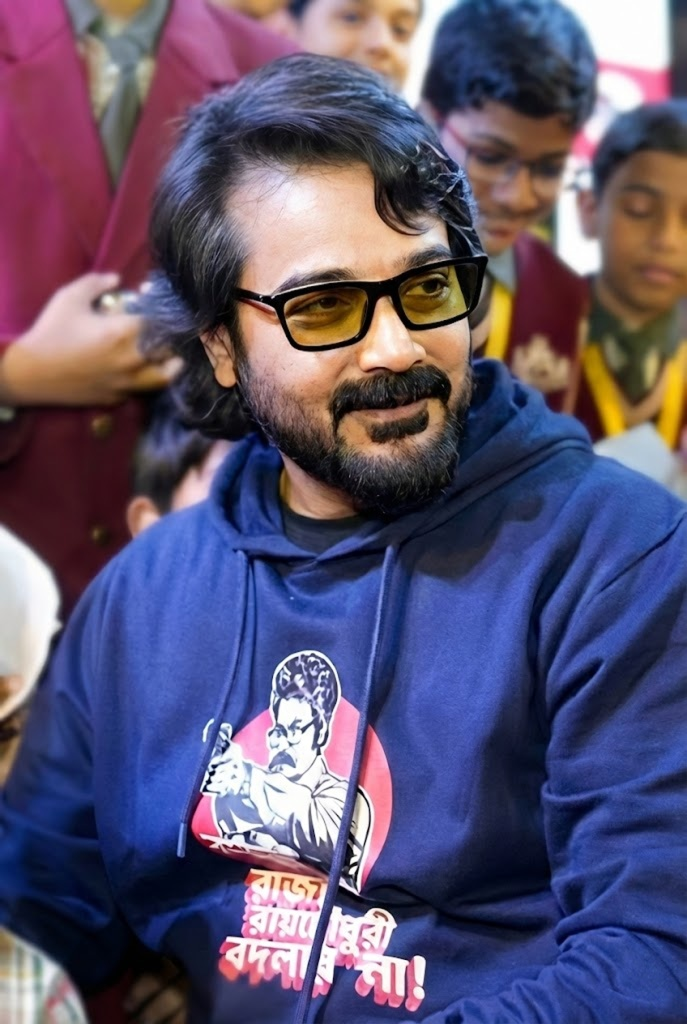
- Prosenjit Chatterjee in 2026
- Pronunciation: [ˈpɾoʃend͡ʒit̪ ˈt͡ʃɔʈːopad̪ʱːae̯]
- Born: 30 September 1962 (age 64); Calcutta, West Bengal, India
- Other names: Bumba Da, Jyeshthoputro (The Eldest Son), Mr. Industry
- Occupations: Actor; director; producer; screenwriter; singer; television personality
- Years active: 1968–present
- Organization: Nideas Productions
- Works: Full list
- Spouses: Debashree Roy (m. 1994; div. 1995); Aparna Guhathakurta (m. 1997; div. 2000); Arpita Pal (m. 2002)
- Children: 2
- Parents: Biswajit Chatterjee (father); Ratna Chatterjee (mother)
- Relatives: Pallavi Chatterjee (sister)
- Awards: Full list
- Honours: Mahanayak Samman (2013); Banga Bibhushan (2018); Padma Shri (2026)
- Website: www.prosenjit.in

Signature
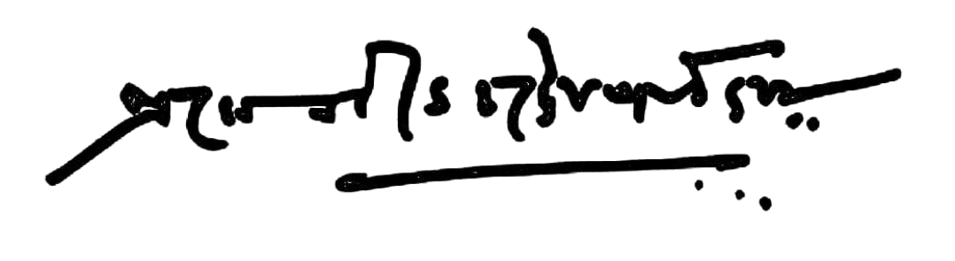

Prosenjit Chatterjee (Note: pronounced [ˈpɾoʃend͡ʒit̪ ˈt͡ʃɔʈːopad̪ʱːae̯].) (Bengali: [ˈpɾoʃend͡ʒit̪ ˈt͡ʃɔʈːopad̪ʱːae̯]; born 30 September 1962) is an Indian actor, director, producer, screenwriter, playback singer and television personality who works primarily in Bengali cinema. Referred to in the media as the "Jyeshthoputro" (Bengali for "The Eldest Son") and "Mr. Industry", through his career spanning over four decades, Prosenjit is widely regarded as one of the most successful and influential actors in the history of Indian cinema. In his cinematic career, he has made over 250 films in Bengali, Hindi and Odia, having numerous accolades, including two National Film Awards, five Filmfare Awards and six BFJA Awards. He was honoured with Mahanayak Samman in 2013, Banga Bibhushan in 2018 and Padma Shri in 2026.

The son of actor Biswajeet Chatterjee, Prosenjit started his career at the age of 5 in Hrishikesh Mukherjee's 1968 Bengali film Chotto Jigyasa, which earned him the BFJA Award for Most Outstanding Work of the Year. After playing a few supporting roles, he progressed to lead role in the romantic drama Duti Pata (1983). Despite having widespread recognition for his portrayal of an unemployed man in Tarun Majumdar's Pathbhola (1986), he reached the height of superstardom with the 1987 blockbuster Amar Sangee. Besides starring in top-grossing romantic films including Chhoto Bou (1988), Jyoti (1988), Aamar Tumi (1989), Amar Prem (1989), Apan Amar Apan (1990), Mandira (1990), Mon Mane Na (1992), Biyer Phool (1996) and Mayar Badhon (1997), he had further box-office hits in action films such as Ora Charjon (1988), Asha O Bhalobasha (1989), Badnam (1990), Sangharsha (1995), Bhai Amar Bhai (1997) and Ranokhetro (1998). He made his directorial debut with Purushottam (1992), which inaugurated the Best Asian Film Award at the Bucheon International Fantastic Film Festival, South Korea. His next Sasurbari Zindabad (2000) became the first Bengali film to have CinemaScope technology, while his portrayal of a volatile police officer in Pratibad (2001) was selected by Forbes India as one of the 25 greatest acting performances of Indian cinema. During this period, Prosenjit gained critical acclaim for his performances as an alcoholic in Devdas (2002), a medical practitioner in Chokher Bali (2003), a disabled person in Dosar (2006), a surveillance specialist in Ami, Yasin Ar Amar Madhubala (2007), a film director in Khela (2008), a film screener in Swapner Din (2008), and a thespian poet in Shob Charitro Kalponik (2009). Dosar earned him National Award in the Special Mention category.

In 2010, Prosenjit transitioned to parallel cinema through Srijit Mukherji's Autograph, for which he was nominated at MIAAC Film Festival, under the Best Actor category. His another author-backed performance came in Moner Manush (2010), the biopic of Lalon, a noted spiritual leader, poet and folk singer of the 19th century Bengal. He got wider appeal for his roles of a troubled father in the sports drama Cholo Paltai (2011), a retired police officer in the psychological thriller Baishe Srabon (2011), a doctor in the political thriller Shanghai (2012), a football coach in the sports drama Lorai (2015), a gangster in the crime drama Zulfiqar (2016), a serial killing specialist in Dawshom Awbotaar (2023), and a businessman in the thriller Ajogyo (2024), and went to earn further recognition in the psychological drama Jaatishwar (2014), erotic thriller Khawto (2015), the romantic drama Praktan (2016), the drama Shankhachil (2016), the National Award-winning dramas Mayurakshi (2017) and Jyeshthoputro (2019), the historical courtroom film Gumnaami (2019), the drama Nirontor (2019), the dark-comedy Kacher Manush (2022), the drama Shesh Pata (2023), the historical actioner Devi Chowdhurani (2025), with expansion to portraying antagonists in the action thriller One (2017) and the romantic thriller Kaberi Antardhan (2023), along with portraying Kakababu in the action-adventure films Mishawr Rawhoshyo (2013), Yeti Obhijaan (2017), Kakababur Protyaborton (2021) and Vijaynagar'er Hirey (2026), each ranking among the highest-grossing Bengali films.

== Personal life ==
Prosenjit lives in Kolkata with his wife, actress Arpita Pal, and their son Trishanjit.

He was previously married to Debashree Roy and Aparna Guha Thakurta. Prosenjit and Aparna have a daughter together, Prerona Chatterjee. In 2015, Prosenjit bought the Bengal Celebrity League cricket team Purulia Panthers.

== Acting career ==
=== Beginning as a child artist (1968–1969) ===
When Hrishikesh Mukherjee was working on the script of Chotto Jigyasa (1968), collaborating with Biswajeet Chatterjee for the third time, he was apparently impressed by Prosenjit and cast him in the central character of the film. In the film, he played a child who initially struggles to cope with his mother's absence, becoming withdrawn and isolated. Prosenjit won the Most Outstanding Work of the Year Award at the 28th BFJA Awards, for his performance in the film at age six.

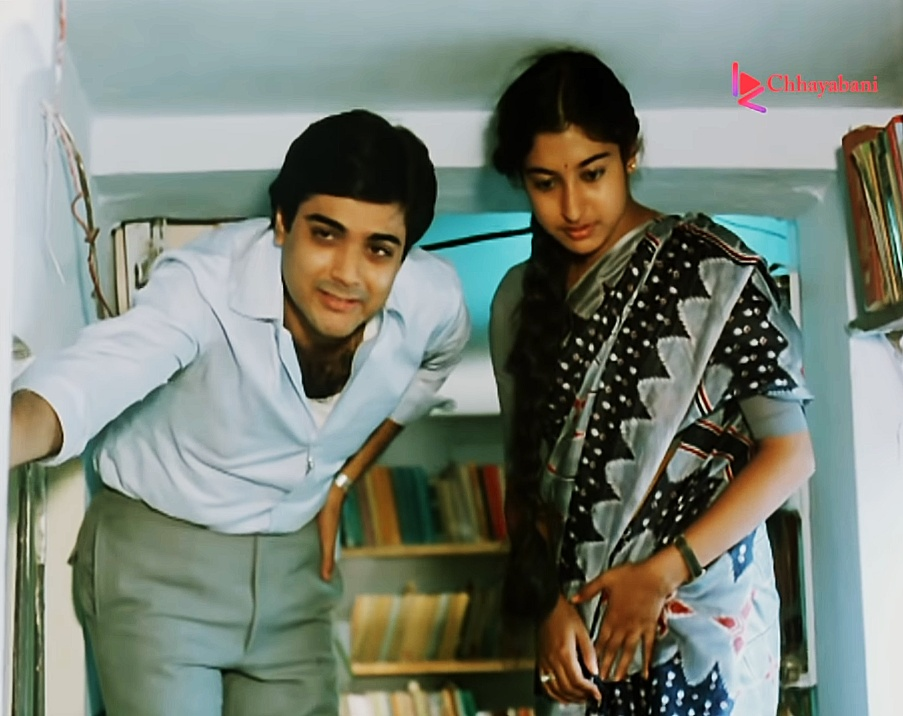
Chatterjee had a successful on-screen collaboration with Satabdi Roy.

Chotto Jigyasa's success led Prosenjit to appear as a child artist in two of his father's films: the first was the Hindi film Rahgir, directed by Tarun Majumdar, and the second was the action thriller Rakta Tilak (1974), which marked his father's directorial debut. In the meanwhile, he continued his education, taking a break from acting.

=== Theatre acting and early years in films (1979–1986) ===
In 1979, after completing the graduation, he joined Nandikar, one of Bengal's earliest theatre groups, where he used to act for a fee of ₹250. His time with the theatre company shaped Prosenjit's craft and ignited his interest in direction, where Rudraprasad Sengupta had served as his mentor. By this time, his performance was observed by Uttam Kumar, who approached him to star in his home-production Dui Prithibi (1980). In the film, he played the younger version of Kumar's character, and also served as the assistant under director Pijush Basu's supervision. During this time, he made brief appearances in some films including a few uncredited roles, such as Pankhiraj (1980) and Kalankini Kankabati (1981).

In 1981, Prosenjit played a supporting role in Manu Sen's multistarrer comedy Subarna Golak, pairing with Debashree Roy for the first time, and became a popular face for playing a negative role in Sukhen Das' action film Pratishodh, starring Uttam Kumar and Soumitra Chatterjee. Contemporarily working in Star Theatre as a professional on stage on thursdays, saturdays and sundays for ₹500 a month, he got his first lead role in Duti Pata (1983), which emerged as a commercial success and went on to be the second highest-grossing Bengali film of 1983. Thematically and stylistically inspired by the Archie comics, the film introduced the genre of teen-age romance with a rich-versus-poor clash as a backdrop to Bengali cinema. Though the film ran for over 22–23 weeks, Prosenjit had to go on playing character roles for the next few years. During this period, he played very different roles in films "made by the great masters"; In Tapan Sinha's Atanka (1986), he played the role of a book seller, and also got much recognition for his portrayal of an unemployed youth in Tarun Majumder's Western film Pathbhola (1986), co-starring Utpal Dutt, Sandhya Roy, Tapas Paul and Abhishek Chatterjee. The same year, he played his first dual role in Prem Bandhan, which became a moderate success, and had in the second lead in the family drama Bouma, directed by Sujit Guha.

=== Breakthrough and rise to prominence (1987–1989) ===
In 1987, Prosenjit played negative roles in Arpan and Mouno Mukhor, and played the lead role alongside Debashree Roy in Samrat O Shundori. The same year, his first breakthrough role came with Sujit Guha's blockbuster musical romance Amar Sangi, alongside Vijayta Pandit. Its success turned him into an overnight sensation, eventually taking top spot at the box office that year and emerging as his biggest up to that point of time. The music by Bappi Lahiri also played a significant role as the song "Chirodini Tumi Je Amar" sung by Kishore Kumar became a chartbuster, which is still considered as the "love anthem" in Bengal. The same year, he made a guest appearance in the film Dolon Chapa, also directed by Guha.

Prosenjit's next releases were Protipokkho (1988) and Channachara (1988), each being moderately successful. That year, actor Samit Bhanja cast him in his directorial debut Ora Charjon, a revisionist Western film. He portrayed a man driven to rebellion after his family is killed due to feudal oppression. Although his intense and emotionally resonant performance was praised, despite the film's grim tone, the film did not performed well at the box office, as per its high production values.

=== Superstardom (1990–2008) ===
He made his debut in Hindi cinema with David Dhawan directed Aandhiyan (1990). Apart from appearing in a series of masala films, he started doing middle-of-the-road cinema with Chokher Bali which starred Aishwarya Rai Bachchan in her debut Bengali film and which met with critical and commercial success upon release. He again came back in doing commercial films and in 2006, he again collaborated with Rituparno Ghosh for Dosar and received the Best Actor Award and National Film Award - Special Jury Award / Special Mention (Feature Film) for his performance in the film.

In 2009, Prosenjit did once again collaborate with Ghosh for Shob Charitro Kalponik, which starred Bipasha Basu in her Bengali debut, won the National Film Award for Best Feature Film in Bengali. In 2010, Prosenjit got another breakthrough by portraying the lead character of Arun Chatterjee in debutant Srijit Mukherji's Autograph, for which he was nominated at MIAAC (Mahindra Indo-American Arts Council) film festival, under the Best Actor category. He portrayed the role of Lalon, a noted spiritual leader, poet and folk singer of Bengal in the 19th century in Goutam Ghose directorial Moner Manush and Anthony Firingee in the National Film Awards winning film, Jaatishwar. He went to earn further recognition and wider appeal for his roles in the romantic thriller Khawto, the drama Praktan, the thriller Traffic, the drama Shankhachil, the crime film Zulfiqar, the National Film Award winning dramas Mayurakshi and Jyeshthoputro, the historical courtroom film Gumnaami, the drama Nirontor, the dark-comedy Kacher Manush, the thriller Kaberi Antardhan and have committed to star in the Hindi films 3 Dev, alongside Kay Kay Menon, Raima Sen, Karan Singh Grover and Tabeer alongside Neeraj Kabi.

Chatterjee produced the Ghosh scripted the television series Gaaner Oparey, which launched the careers of brothers Arjun Chakraborty and Gaurav Chakraborty and Mimi Chakraborty as well. In 2016, he debuted on the non-fiction category of television with a 97-episode mini-series, titled Mahanayak. Produced by Shree Venkatesh Films and directed by Birsa Dasgupta, the show starred Paoli Dam, Tanushree Chakraborty and Priyanka Sarkar in other pivotal roles and was based on the life of a superstar of the 60s era — a life fraught with career highs and personal turbulences.

He made his debut as a protagonist with Bimal Roy's Duti Pata (1983), a teenage romance along the lines of Bobby. Amar Sangi (1987) opposite Vijayeta Pandit, Apon Amaar Apon (1990) directed by Tarun Majumdar and Buddhadeb Dasgupta's Ami, Yasin Ar Amar Madhubala (2007) are three important films of his career. The song "Chirodini Tumi Je Amar" from Amar Sangi became a cult hit. Satabdi Roy has acted with him in more than 50 films. He has done 35 films with Rachana Banerjee, 50 with Rituparna Sengupta, around 16 with Indrani Haldar and four with his wife Arpita Pal. Prosenjit debuted in Bollywood in 1990 with the David Dhawan directed Aandhiyan where he played the role of Mumtaz's son. After working in commercial films, Chatterjee started debuted in Parallel Cinema with Rituparno Ghosh's Chokher Bali (film) and since then have appeared in numerous art films, including Dosar, Jaatishwar, Shankhachil, Shob Charitro Kalponik. Chatterjee returned to Hindi cinema by playing the role of lead protagonist in Mehul Kumar directed Meet Mere Man Ke (1991) alongside Ayesha Jhulka, Feroz Khan and Salma Agha. His other Bollywood films are Sone Ki Zanjeer, Veerta, Shanghai and more recently Traffic which received critical acclaim upon release. One of the most important works of Prosenjit is as Arun Chatterjee in Srijit Mukherji's Autograph. His first ever produced film Bapi Bari Jaa was released on 7 December 2012.

== Television ==
| Year | Title | Channel |
|---|---|---|
| 2010–2011 | Gaaner Oparey | Star Jalsha |
| 2011–2012 | Kanakanjali | Zee Bangla |
| 2014 | Tumi Je Aamar | Zee Bangla |
| 2016 | Mahanayak Uttam Kumar | Star Jalsha |
| 2018–2019 | Shubho Drishti | Colors Bangla |
| 2019 | Aloukik Na Loukik | Star Jalsha |
| 2023–2024 | Alor Kole | Zee Bangla |
| 2024–2025 | Amar Sangee | Zee Bangla |
| 2024–2025 | Mittir Bari | Zee Bangla |
| 2025 | Kabhi Neem Neem Kabhi Shahad Shahad | StarPlus |
| 2025–2026 | Sriman Bhogoban Das | Zee Bangla Sonar |

Reality Shows

1. Banglar Shera Paribar

2. Ke Hobe Banglar Kotipoti
