= Aamar Tumi =

1989 Bengali-language film by Bimal Ray Jr.

- VCD cover
- Directed by: Bimal Ray (Jr.)
- Produced by: Dipti Pal
- Starring: Prosenjit Chatterjee; Farah Naaz; Subhendu Chatterjee; Rabi Ghosh; Biplab Chatterjee
- Music by: Bappi Lahiri
- Distributed by: Angel Digital
- Release date: February 27, 1989
- Country: India
- Language: Bengali
- Budget: 40Lakhs
- Box office: 49.50Lakhs

Aamar Tumi (transl. You're Mine) is a 1989 Indian Bengali-language film directed by Bimal Ray (Jr.) and produced by Dipti Pal. The film features actors Prosenjit Chatterjee and Farah Naaz in the lead roles. The music was composed by Bappi Lahiri.

== Cast ==
- Prosenjit Chatterjee
- Farah Naaz
- Subhendu Chatterjee
- Rabi Ghosh
- Biplab Chatterjee
- Shakuntala Barua
- Nayana Das
- Master Shibam
- Sanghamitra Bandyopadhyay
