= Ramprasad (elephant) =

Elephant of Maharana Pratap

Ram Prasad (meaning: Gift from Lord Rama) was an elephant of Maharana Pratap's army mentioned in the scripts of Al-Qadir Badayuni. Ramprasad was trained in the Kingdom of Mewar and fought the Mughal army in the Battle of Haldighati on 18 June 1576.

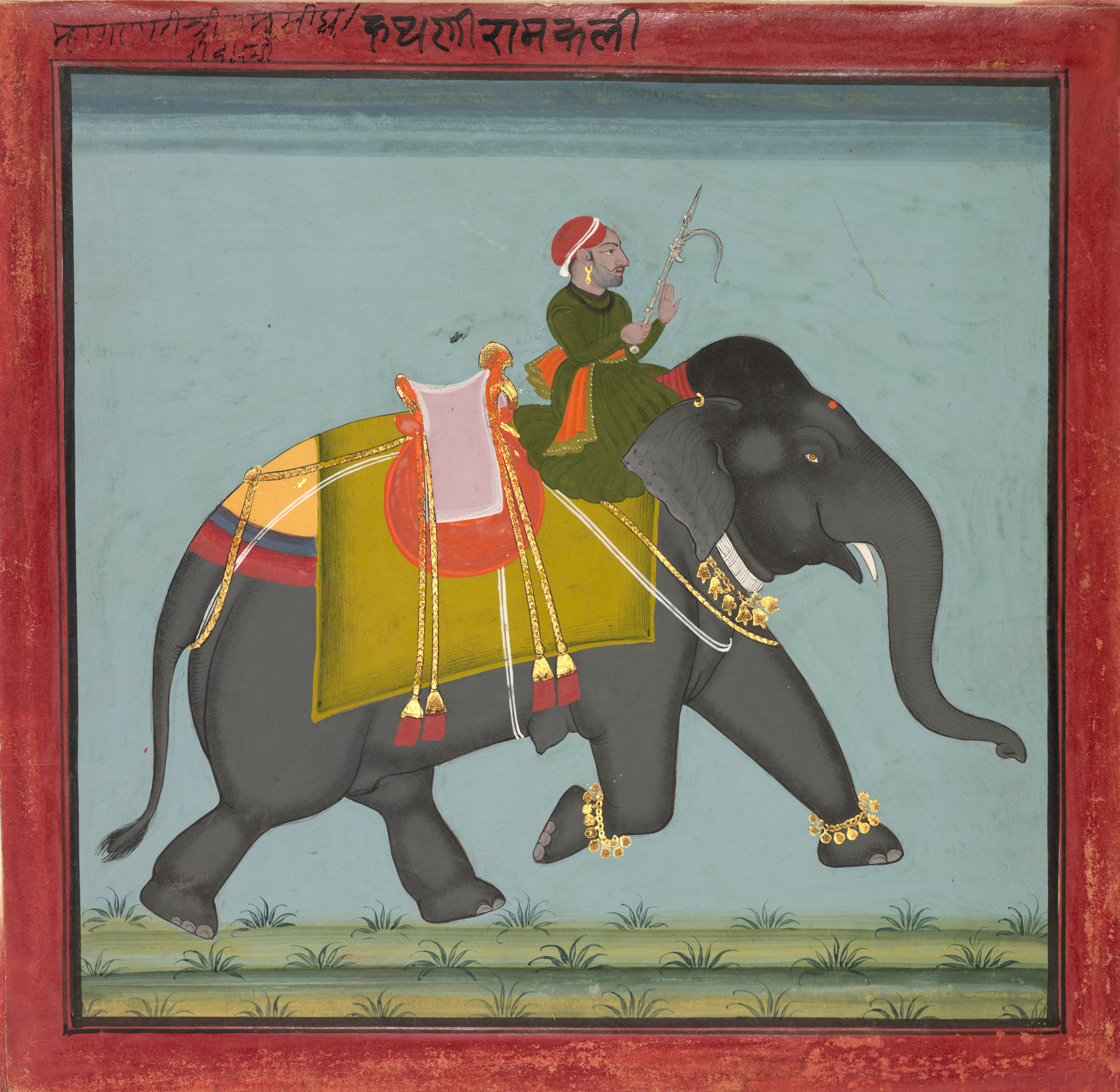
Painting depicting a Mewari Mahout riding Ramprasad

== Life ==
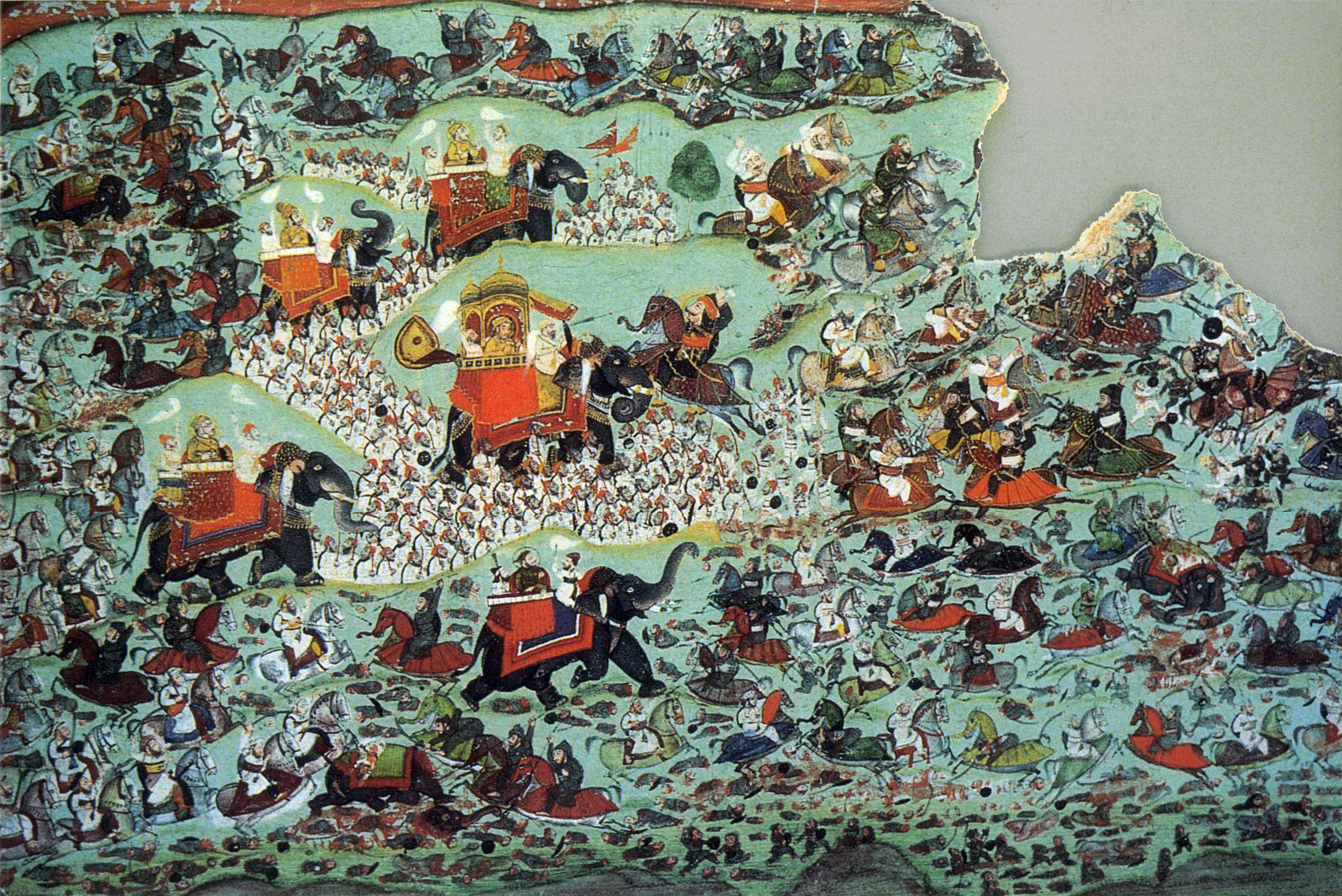
Painting of the Battle of Haldighati (1576) painted in 1822

Maharana Pratap had a deep love for his horse Chetak and also for an elephant whose name was Ramprasad.

Al-Qadir Badayuni says that when Akbar attacked the Kingdom of Mewar, he wanted two things to be captured: Maharana Pratap and Ram Prasad. He says that Ramprasad was a brave and smart elephant of the Mewar army. He further says that when the Battle of Haldighati started, Ramprasad with his mahout and Chieftain (Pratap Singh Tanwar) started attacking the Mughal army. Ramprasad is said to have killed 13 elephants of the Mughal army, along with their mahouts. However, Ramprasad's mahout was shot with an arrow by the Mughal forces and downed.

After Mansingh received news that one elephant was killing his soldiers rapidly, he formed a Chakravyuh, consisting of seven mightiest royal elephants of the Mughal army, with 14 strong men holding each elephant. The forces surrounded Ramprasad, allowing Mansingh to capture him after killing Pratap Singh Tomar. Ramprasad was sent to Agra under intense security.

In Agra, Ramprasad got huge hospitality and was kept on royal watch by Akbar. Akbar renamed him Peerprasad and offered him sugarcanes, fruits and water, which he refused. Ramprasad died after 18 days without taking the Mughal food and water.

Akbar's comment on Ramprasad is also mentioned In the scripts of Al-Qadir Badayuni, Akbar is recorded as saying: "The one's whose elephant didn't bow down in front of me, how would I be able to slain Maharana Pratap." The mughals were stunned by the loyalty of an animal towards its master.

== See also ==
- Chetak
- Battle of Haldighati
- Kingdom of Mewar
