= Shubho Drishti =

Indian Bengali television soap opera

- Title Screen
- Genre: Drama; Romance
- Created by: Vandana Films and Enterprises (original)
- Based on: Struggling Love story
- Screenplay by: Koushik Bhattacharya; Dialogue; Tanmoy Goswami
- Story by: Pritikona Pal Roy
- Directed by: Rahul Mukherjee
- Creative director: Rahul Mukherjee
- Presented by: Bright Advertising Pvt. Ltd.
- Starring: Gourab Roy Chowdhury; Aishwarya Sen; Joyjit Banerjee; Oindrilla Bose; Sukanya Goswami
- Voices of: Anupam Roy; Somlatta Chowdhury Acharyya
- Opening theme: "Shubho Drishti"
- Composer: Anupam Roy
- Country of origin: India
- Original language: Bengali
- No. of seasons: 1
- No. of episodes: 347

Production
- Executive producers: Sumit Kumar Roy, Satyajit Chakraborty, Poulimi Bowmik(Colors Bangla)
- Producer: Shibaji Panja
- Production locations: Orissa; West Bengal; Puri
- Cinematography: Siddhartha Mukherjee
- Running time: 22 minutes
- Production company: Vandana Films

Original release
- Network: Colors Bangla
- Release: 1 January 2018 – 12 January 2019

Related
- Arabya Rajani

Shubho Drishti was a popular Bengali television soap opera. It premiered on 1 January 2018. It aired on Colors Bangla, starring Gourab Roy Chowdhury and Aishwarya Sen in lead roles and Bidipta Chakraborty and Sukanya Goswami in a negative role. The show was produced by Shibaji Panja of Vandana Films and Enterprises. Prasenjit Chatterjee and Rituparna Sengupta played cameo roles in this serial.

== Plot ==
The journeys of two pairs of siblings – Abir-Drishti and Subho-Antara – lead to a series of tense happenstances. The recent episodes reveal the twists in the plot. It shows the trials and tribulations of unexpected events in the lead pair’s lives on the track where Drishti’s would-be husband Rahul gets kidnapped and Subho gets the blame. Meanwhile, Abir refuses to marry Antara until his sister gets married.

== Cast ==
=== Main ===
- Gourab Roy Chowdhury as Shubhojit Mukherjee (Subho) / Main Male Lead
- Aishwarya Sen as Drishti Mukherjee (nee Basu) / Main Female Lead
- Debarshi Banerjee / Rajib Basu as Abir Basu (Parallel Male Lead; dead)
- Oindrilla Bose as Antara Basu (nee Deb Roy) / Parallel Female Lead
- Joyjit Banerjee as Sagnik Sen(Antagonist)
- Bidipta Chakraborty as Annapoorna Mukherjee / Main Female Antagonist
- Somasree Chaki
- Raj Bhattacharya as Rahul Gupta / Main Male Antagonist
- Sukanya Goswami as Sana / Parallel Female Antagonist
- Sutirtha Saha as Shoukarjyo/Antara's Childhood Friend /Parallel Male Lead
- Sreetama Roy Chowdhury as Anandi/Antagonist/Drishti's Childhood Friend

=== Supporting ===
- Sandip Dey as Shekhar Basu (Drishti's Father)
- Ranjini Chatterjee as Malini Basu (Drishti's Mother)
- Rumpa Chatterjee as Drishti's Aunt (Mashimoni)
- Niladri Lahiri as Rajat Deb Roy (Antara's father and Shubho's stepfather)
- Abanti Dutta as Krishna Deb Roy (Shubho and Antara's mother)
- Saurav Chakraborty as Abhik
- Saurav Ghosh as Subho's Assistant
- Indrakshi Nag as Debjani Chowdhury (Antagonist)
- Kausiki Tinni Guha as Soham's Mother
- Saugata Bandopadhyay as Soham Sengupta/Drishti 's childhood friend
- Rituparna Basak as Septy (Saptaparni)
- Somashri Bhattacharyya as Raai
- Mousumi Das as Pishimoni (Dead)
- Anushka Bhattacharjee as Tinni/Sagnik's Daughter
- Shankar Debnath as Shoukarjyo's father and Sagnik's uncle
- Ritoja Majumdar as Shoukarjyo's mother and Sagnik's aunt
- Sujata Dawn as Neela/Aditi Mukherjee, sister of Shubho

=== Guest appearances/Cameo ===
- Prosenjit Chatterjee as Bumba Daa
- Rituparna Sengupta as Ritu Di
