= Aandhiyan =

- Theatrical release poster
- Directed by: David Dhawan
- Written by: Anees Bazmee (dialogues)
- Screenplay by: Ram Kelkar
- Produced by: Pahlaj Nihalani
- Starring: Shatrughan Sinha; Mumtaz; Prosenjit Chatterjee; Madhushree
- Edited by: Nand Kumar
- Music by: Bappi Lahiri
- Production company: Vishal Film Combines
- Release date: 8 June 1990
- Running time: 145 minutes
- Country: India
- Language: Hindi

Aandhiyan (transl. Storms) is a 1990 Hindi film directed by David Dhawan. It stars Shatrughan Sinha, Prosenjit Chatterjee, Madhushree and Mumtaz in her comeback role after 13 years. The film marked Bengali actor Prosenjit Chatterjee's Hindi film debut. the film was remake of 1984 Pakistani film Doorian

== Plot ==
The story revolves around Shakuntala and Dushyant. Dushyan's father would not approve of their marriage because Shakuntala was from a poor background. The movie shows Dushyant's struggle to decide whether to stay with his wife or his father.

== Cast ==
- Shatrughan Sinha as Dushyant
- Mumtaz as Shakuntala
- Prosenjit Chatterjee as Vikram "Vicky"
- Madhushree as Kiran
- Saeed Jaffrey as Shakuntala's Father
- Om Shivpuri as Dushyant's Father
- Anil Dhawan as Vikram's lawyer
- Satyen Kappu as Judge

== Music ==
Anjaan wrote all the songs.

1. "Phir Dil Ne Woh Chot Khayi" - Kumar Sanu
2. "Duniya Mein Tere Siva" - Anuradha Paudwal, Udit Narayan
3. "Ye Wada Karle Wada" - Manhar Udhas, Anuradha Paudwal
4. "Meri Maa Ne Bataya Hai Yahi Mujhko Sikhaya Hai" - Shabbir Kumar
5. "Ole Ole" - Rajkumar Bafna, Falguni
6. "Kya Mil Gayi Dusri" - Falguni
7. "Duniya Mein Tere Siva(Sad)" - Anuradha Paudwal
8. "Ole Ole" - Anuradha Paudwal, Udit Narayan
