= Rakta Tilak =

1974 Bengali action film by Biswajeet Chatterjee

- Directed by: Biswajeet Chatterjee
- Screenplay by: Ajit Ganguly
- Story by: Ratna Chatterjee
- Produced by: Biswajeet Chakraborty
- Starring: Uttam Kumar; Biswajeet Chatterjee; Supriya Devi; Rabi Ghosh; Tarun Kumar
- Cinematography: Bijoy Dey
- Edited by: Dulal Dutta
- Music by: Pradip Roy Chowdhury
- Production company: Trio Films
- Distributed by: Joyjit Films
- Release date: 15 February 1974
- Country: India
- Language: Bengali

Rakta Tilak (Bengali pronunciation: [ˈrɔkt̪o ˈtilok] transl. Tilak of Blood) is a 1974 Indian Bengali-language action film produced and directed by Biswajeet Chatterjee in his directorial debut, under the banner of Trio Films. The film stars Chatterjee himself as a elusive dacoit with expertise in disguise, who is attempted to be apprehended by police officer R. D. Chowdhury, played by Uttam Kumar. It also stars Supriya Devi, Rabi Ghosh, Tarun Kumar and Alaka Ganguly in another pivotal roles, with Prosenjit Chatterjee as a child artist.

== Plot ==
Ustad Roop Singh leads a gang of robbers in Madhya Pradesh in disguise. At one point, while hiding from the police, he has a change of heart and after a series of incidents involving his human feelings, he tries to surrender to the police, but in the process many of his men die and Roop Singh survives.

== Cast ==
- Uttam Kumar as DIG R. D. Chowdhury IPS / Inspector Leopard
- Biswajeet Chatterjee as Ranadev / Roop "Roopa" Singh, a dacoit from Madhya Pradesh / Swami Jogananda Maharaj / Raja
  - Prosenjit Chatterjee as younger Ranadev
- Supriya Devi in dual roles as
  - Binata, R. D.'s wife
  - Swarnamoyee, Ranadev's elder sister
- Alaka Ganguly as Champa Bai, Roop's love interest
- Rabi Ghosh as Bhagyadhar / Sarisreep Biswas
- Shambhu Bhattacharya as Amritlal Singh, Roop's assistant
- Tarun Kumar as SI Tarun Basak
- Bankim Ghosh as OC Avtar Singh
- Shekhar Chattejee as Thakur Singh, Roop's mentor and Amrit's father
- Nripati Chatterjee as Nirmal Dutta / a police informant
- Kamu Mukherjee, a lustful fan of Champa
- Manmatha Mukherjee as Raj Narayan

== Production ==
When Biswajeet Chatterjee narrated the script of Rakta Tilak to Uttam Kumar, he was fascinated to play the daredevil character of R. D. Chowdhury. As Kumar already had a mild heart attack before, Biswajeet advised Kumar to use a body-double and also proposed to take long shots to film the chase sequence, where Roop and Bhagyadhar is eloping and R. D. is following them in Madhya Pradesh, but the latter performed his stunts himself.

The film was partially shot in Hazaribagh, where at least 150 artists went from Kolkata. A major portion shot at Hazaribagh Wildlife Sanctuary, where the Border Guard Force also joined.

== Soundtrack ==
The soundtrack was initially to be composed by Hemanta Mukherjee, while later he came out due to his commitment to other films. Then Pradeep Roy Chowdhury replaced him, with lyrics by Hiren Bose and Mrinal Chakraborty.

Track listing
No.	Title	Lyrics	Singer(s)	Length
1.	"Sristi Theke"	Hiren Bose	Biswajeet Chatterjee	3:38
2.	"Eso Mor Madhukunje"	Mrinal Chakraborty	Asha Bhosle	3:22
3.	"Ei Bahare Ese"	Hiren Bose	Asha Bhosle	2:55
4.	"Jiban Prabhat"	Hiren Bose	Shyamal Chakraborty	3:45
Total length:				13:41
