= Shalivahan Singh Tomar =

Salivahan Tomar
- Prince of Gwalior
- Born: 1542; Gwalior
- Died: 1576 (aged 33–34); Haldighati
- Cause of death: Died in the battle of Haldigathi
- Issue: Shyamshah Tanwar; Mitrasen Tanwar; Rao Dharmagat
- House: Tomara
- Dynasty: Tomar of Gwalior
- Father: Ramshah Tanwar

Salivahan Tomar or Shalivahan Singh Tanwar was heir apparent and son of Ramshah Tanwar the Tomar Rajput ruler of Gwalior. He was the last crowned price of Gwalior. He and his father Ramshah Tomar were ousted by Akbar from Gwalior and sought refuge in Mewar which at the time was the only state who refused Akbar as head of state.

He along with his father, Ramshah Tomar, brothers Pratap Singh and Bhavani Singh and 300 others including his nephew 11 years old Balbhadr Singh Tomar were martyred in Battle of Haldighati. His 3 sons were survived and were given Thikanas in Lakhansar (Bikaner), Khetasar and Kelawa (Jodhpur) and Dalniya (Jaipur) by Akbar.

== Lineage ==
Tanwar of Gwalior Descendants of Sohan Singh s/o Anangpal Tomar of Delhi - ruler in the 12th century.

1. Virsimha Dev (Vir Singh Deo) (1394-1400)
2. Uddhharana Dev (1400-1402)
3. Virama Dev (Biram Deo) 1402-1419)
4. Ganapati Dev (1419-1425)
5. Dungarasimha or Dungar Singh (1425-1459)
6. Kirtisimha (1459-1479)
7. Kalyanmal or Kalyanmalla (1479-1486)
8. Manasimha (Man Singh Tomar) (1486-1516)
9. Vikramsimha (Vikramaditya Singh Tomar) (1516 -1523), fought against Babur in the first battle of Panipat along with Ibrahim Lodi and died in 1526.
10. Ramshah Tomar born 1521 (1526 - 1576) died in the battle of Haldighati.
11. Salivahan Singh Tomar, (born 1542 -1576) married a daughter of Udai Singh II of Mewar He died in the battle of Haldighati.

== Progeny ==
1. Shyamshah Tomar, heir apparent to the Tomar throne of Gwalior, took service under Akbar after Maharana Pratap's demise in 1597 AD.
2. Mitrasen Tomar
3. Rao Dharmagat
  1. His descendants were given Thikanas in Lakhansar (Bikaner), Khetasar and Kelawa (Jodhpur) and Dalniya (Jaipur).
