= Ora Charjon =

- Ora Charjon VCD cover
- Directed by: Samit Bhanja
- Written by: Samit Bhanja
- Screenplay by: Amitabha Chattopadhyay
- Story by: Samit Bhanja
- Produced by: Ranja Film Enterprise
- Starring: Prosenjit Chatterjee; Debashree Roy; Abhishek Chatterjee; Rabi Ghosh; Anup Kumar; Chinmoy Roy; Shakuntala Barua
- Music by: Arun Rabin
- Distributed by: Angel Video
- Release date: 1988
- Country: India
- Language: Bengali
- Budget: 3,00,000
- Box office: 4,50,000

Ora Charjon is a 1988 Bengali-language revisionist Western film directed by Samit Bhanja and produced by Ranja Film Enterprise. The film features actors Prosenjit Chatterjee and Debashree Roy in the lead roles. Music of the film has been composed by Arun Rabin.

== Cast ==
- Prosenjit Chatterjee as Joseph
- Debika Mitra as Reena
- Debashree Roy
- Abhishek Chatterjee as Sundar
- Rabi Ghosh
- Anup Kumar
- Chinmoy Roy
- Shakuntala Barua
- Goutam Chakraborty as Ramu Dusad
