= Shankhachil =

- Theatrical Release Poster
- Bengali: শঙ্খচিল
- Directed by: Goutam Ghose
- Written by: Sayantani Putatunda
- Screenplay by: Goutam Ghose; Timir Baran
- Produced by: Prosenjit Chatterjee; Faridur Reza Sagar; Mou Raychowdhury; Habibur Rahman Khan
- Starring: Prosenjit; Kusum Sikder; Shajbati
- Cinematography: Ishaan Ghose
- Edited by: Baishali Dasgupta; Bhowmick; Niladri Roy
- Music by: Goutam Ghose
- Production companies: Ashirbad Cholochitro; Impress Telefilm Limited; NIdeas Creations & Productions
- Distributed by: Zee Studios; V3G Films Private Limited; Priya Entertainments Pvt. Ltd
- Release date: 15 April 2016
- Running time: 135 minutes
- Countries: Bangladesh; India
- Language: Bengali

Shankhachil (Brahminy kite, Bengali: শঙ্খচিল) is a 2016 Indo-Bangladesh joint production Bengali-language historical Drama film, written by Sayantani Putatunda, starring Prosenjit, Kusum Sikder, Shajbati and directed by Goutam Ghose. This film is named after the bird Brahminy kite which is used by many Bengali poets like Jibanananda Das.

Shankhachil was well received by Upam Buzarbaruah, writing in The Times of India. It won the Best Feature Film in Bengali award at 63rd National Film Awards. It was also selected for the Montreal World Film Festival.

== Plot ==
It is a story of a simple village couple from Bangladesh who come to Taki for the treatment of their ailing daughter named Rupsha. Their life and struggle are portrayed in the film.

== Cast ==
- Prosenjit Chatterjee as Muntasir Chowdhury Badal
- Kusum Sikder as Laila
- Shajbati as Rupsha
- Shahed Ali
- Ushasie Chakraborty
- Priyanshu Chatterjee as BSF Officer Ravi Verma (Cameo Role)
- Deepankar De
- Prabir Mitra
- Mamunur Rashid
- Rajesh Shinde
- Rosey Siddiqui
- Arindam Sil
- Nakul Vaid

== Awards and nominations ==
Ceremony	Category	Nominee	Result
63rd National Film Awards	National Film Award for Best Feature Film in Bengali	Shankhachil	Won
Filmfare Awards East	Filmfare Award for Best Film – Bengali	Shankhachil	Nominated
Filmfare Awards East	Filmfare Award for Best Director – Bengali	Goutam Ghose	Nominated
Filmfare Awards East	Filmfare Award for Best Actor – Bengali	Prosenjit Chatterjee	Won
Filmfare Awards East	Filmfare Award for Best Supporting Actress – Bengali	Shajbati	Nominated
Filmfare Awards East	Filmfare Award for Best Production Design – Bengali	Indranil Ghosh; Uttam Guha	Nominated
Filmfare Awards East	Filmfare Award for Best Background Score – Bengali	Goutam Ghose	Nominated
Filmfare Awards East	Filmfare Award for Best Cinematography – Bengali	Ishaan Ghose	Nominated
Filmfare Awards East	Filmfare Award for Best Sound Design – Bengali	Anirban Sengupta	Won
Bangladesh National Film Awards 2016	Best Actress	Kusum Sikder	Won
Bangladesh National Film Awards 2016	Best Child Artist	Anum Rahman Khan (Sajbati)	Won
Bangladesh National Film Awards 2016	Best Art Direction	Uttam Guho	Won
