= Dosar =

2006 Indian Bengali film

- Movie poster for Dosar
- Directed by: Rituparno Ghosh
- Written by: Shirshendu Mukhopadhyay
- Starring: Prosenjit Chatterjee; Konkona Sen Sharma
- Cinematography: Avik Mukhopadhyay
- Edited by: Arghyakamal Mitra
- Distributed by: Planman Motion Pictures
- Release date: 14 April 2006
- Running time: 127 minutes
- Country: India
- Language: Bengali

Dosar (transl. Emotional companion) is a 2006 Bengali language Indian drama film. It was produced by Arindam Chaudhuri (Planman Motion Pictures) and directed by Rituparno Ghosh. The black-and-white film won the National Film Award – Special Jury Award / Special Mention (Feature Film) for the lead role portrayal by Prosenjit Chatterjee. The movie additionally stars Konkona Sen Sharma, who for her part won the Best Actress Award at the New York Film Festival in 2007. The film was premiered in the 60th 2007 Cannes Film Festival in the Les Cinema Du Monde section. The film was a sleeper hit at the box office.

== Synopsis ==
The story revolves around Kaushik and Kaberi, a happy couple until a car accident takes away Mita, Kaushik's mistress, and leaves Kaushik injured and grieving. Mita, the mother of a little boy and living with her husband, was Kaushik's colleague. This revelation leaves Kaberi shattered. Kaushik successfully moves on with life leaving Mita behind and tries his best to repair the severely wounded relationship with his wife. Another couple in the film, Brinda and Bobby, are also engaged in an extramarital relation. While Bobby is a bachelor, Brinda, quite older than Bobby, is unhappily married. They and Kaberi do group theatre together. Brinda-Bobby comes to a crossroads when Brinda becomes pregnant and Bobby is not sure whether the child is his or her husband's. However, he does not turn back and stands by Brinda in sorting out her issues.

Kaberi often threatens divorce but ultimately is overpowered by the wife in her and cannot resist fulfilling her duties towards her husband at the time of crisis. On the other hand, Kaushik is also caught in his own predicament. He has to not only come to terms with the loss of a loved one but is faced with the daunting task of winning back his wife's trust.

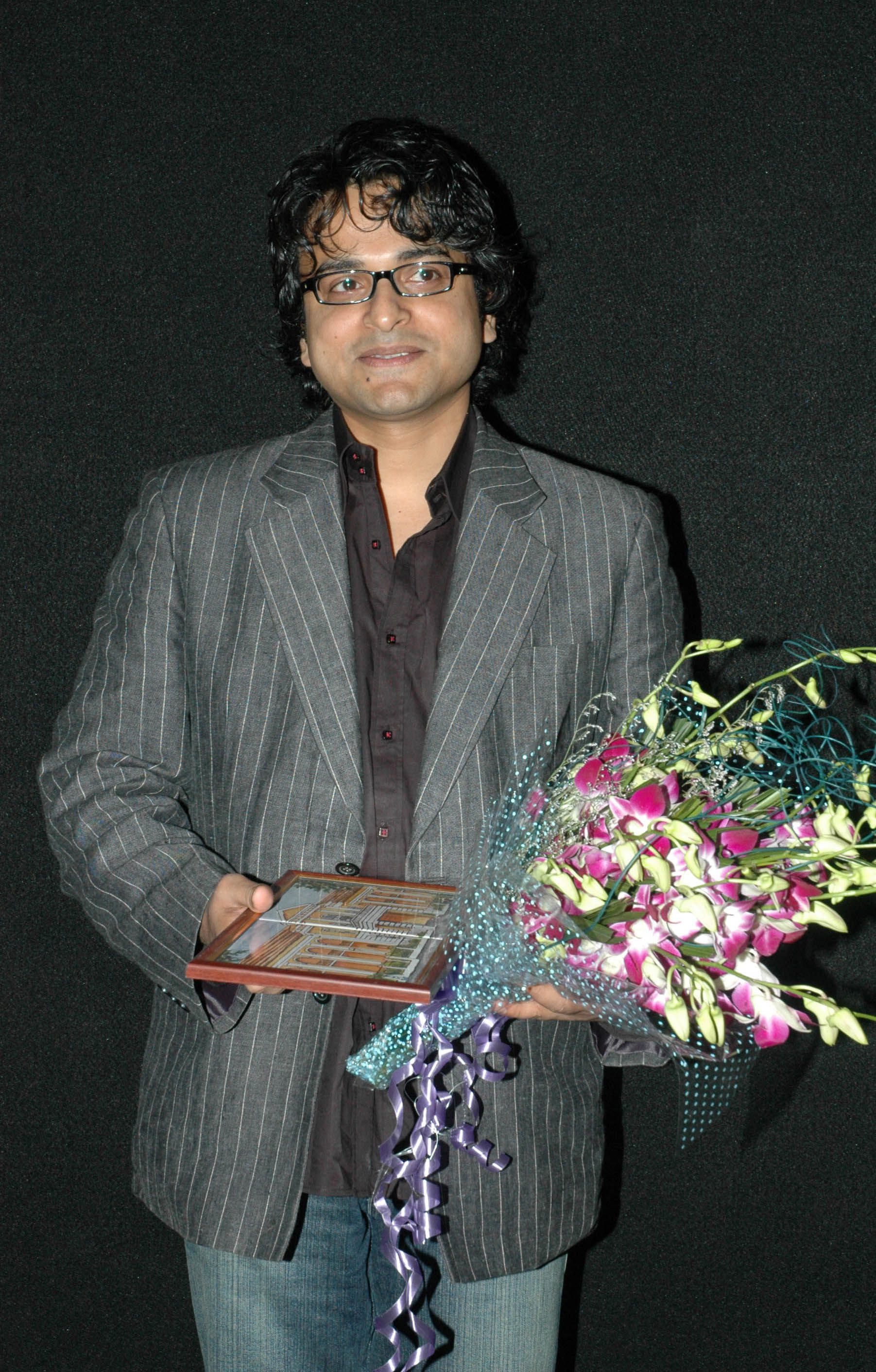
Producer Subho Shekhar Bhattacharjee presenting the film at IFFI (2006)

== Cast ==
- Prosenjit Chatterjee as Kaushik Chatterjee
- Konkona Sen Sharma as Kaberi Chatterjee
- Chandrayee Ghosh as Mita Ray
- Shankar Chakraborty as Mita Ray's husband/ Mr. Biswas
- Pallavi Chatterjee as Brinda
- Parambrata Chatterjee as Bobby/ Bibaswan
- Saswata Chatterjee as Kaushik's younger brother /Bubul
- Tota Roy Chowdhury as Kaushik's colleague
- Pushpita Mukherjee as Nurse Khushi
- Mithu Chakrabarty as Kaberi's mother

== Awards ==
- 2007 :Bengal Film Journalists' Association Awards: Best Actor Award for Prosenjit Chatterjee
- 2007: Mahindra Indo-American Arts Council (MIAAC) Film Festival : Best Actress for Konkona Sen Sharma.
- 2007, Mahindra Indo-American Arts Council (MIAAC) Film Festival : Best Director for Rituparno Ghosh.
- 2007: National Film Award – Special Jury Award / Special Mention (Feature Film) for Prosenjit Chatterjee
