= Ranokhetro =

1998 Bengali action thriller film by Haranath Chakraborty

- Theatrical release poster
- Directed by: Haranath Chakraborty
- Screenplay by: Monotosh Chakraborty
- Dialogues by: Monotosh Chakraborty
- Story by: Monotosh Chakraborty
- Produced by: Shrikant Mohta; Mahendra Soni
- Starring: Ranjit Mallick; Prosenjit Chatterjee; Satabdi Roy; Kushal Chakraborty; Aparajita Auddy; Dipankar De; Subhendu Chatterjee
- Cinematography: P. Vijay; B. Satish
- Edited by: Swapan Guha
- Music by: Debojyoti Mishra
- Production company: Shree Venkatesh Films
- Distributed by: Shree Venkatesh Films
- Release date: 25 September 1998
- Running time: 150 minutes
- Country: India
- Language: Bengali

Ranokhetro (transl. Battleground) is a 1998 Indian Bengali-language action thriller film co-written and directed by Haranath Chakraborty. Produced by Shrikant Mohta and Mahendra Soni under the banner of Shree Venkatesh Films, the story, screenplay and dialogues of the film were written by Monotosh Chakraborty. It stars Ranjit Mallick, Prosenjit Chatterjee and Satabdi Roy in the lead roles; while Kushal Chakraborty, Dipankar De, Aparajita Auddy, Tota Roy Chowdhury, Subhendu Chatterjee, Dulal Lahiri, Kaushik Banerjee, Sumanta Mukherjee and Lily Chakravarty play other pivotal roles. The soundtrack of the film was composed by Debojyoti Mishra, with lyrics penned by Pulak Bandyopadhyay and Rituparno Ghosh.

== Plot ==
Santu is murdered in the hands of a corrupt minister's drug-peddling son when he protests against the sale of drugs on the college campus. As the law enforcers turn a deaf ear to Raja's pleas, he decides to avenge his brother's death.

== Cast ==
- Prosenjit Chatterjee as Raja Roy Chowdhury, an auto-rickshaw driver
- Ranjit Mallick as Prof. Sudeb Mitra / Pritam Singh, latter editor of Dainik Janabaani
- Satabdi Roy as Jhuma Bose, news reporter of Dainik Janabaani
- Deepankar De as MLA Satya Roy
- Tota Roy Chowdhury as Noni Roy, MLA's son and the leader of the drug peddlers at the college campus
- Dulal Lahiri as Sub inspector Jeevan Dutta
- Subhendu Chatterjee as Ashok Bose, former editor of Dainik Janabaani and Jhuma's father
- Kushal Chakraborty as Santosh Roy Chowdhury, alias Santu, Raja's younger brother
- Aparajita Adhya as Rita, Santu's love interest
- Kaushik Banerjee as Mintu, MLA's henchman
- Lily Chakraborty as Raja and Santu's Mother
- Subhasish Mukhopadhyay as Ajay alias Felu
- Tarun Kumar as Prof.
- Raju Thakkar as drug dealer Jung Bahadur

== Soundtrack ==
Ranokhetro

Soundtrack album by Debojyoti Mishra
- Released: 25 September 1998
- Recorded: 1997–1998
- Genre: Feature film soundtrack
- Length: 20:58
- Language: Bengali
- Label: Shree Venkatesh Films

Debojyoti Mishra chronology
Hazaar Chaurasi Ki Maa (1998)	Ranokhetro (1998)	Asukh (1999)

All lyrics are written by Pulak Bandyopadhyay and Rituparno Ghosh; all music is composed by Debojyoti Mishra.

No.	Title	Lyrics	Singer(s)	Length
1.	"Goli Theke Raaj Pathey"	Rituparno Ghosh	Udit Narayan	4:29
2.	"Interview Din Interview"	Pulak Bandyopadhyay	Poroma, Pratik Chowdhury	3:14
3.	"Ektu Thama Ki Ektu Chawla"	Pulak Bandyopadhyay	Udit Narayan, Poroma	3:59
4.	"Kichhu Kichhu Raat Emon"	Pulak Bandyopadhyay	Kavita Krishnamurthy	4:19
5.	"Swapno Aamar Sob"	Pulak Bandyopadhyay	Poroma	4:03
6.	"Goli Theke Raaj Pathey (sad)"	Rituparno Ghosh	Pratik Chowdhury	0:54
Total length:				20:58

== Awards ==
- Anandalok Award for Best Actor Prosenjit Chatterjee
