= Khawto =

Khawto ক্ষত
- Directed by: Kamaleshwar Mukherjee
- Produced by: Shrikant Mohta
- Starring: Prosenjit Chatterjee; Paoli Dam; Raima Sen
- Cinematography: Soumik Haldar
- Music by: Anupam Roy
- Production company: Shree Venkatesh Films
- Distributed by: Shree Venkatesh Films
- Release date: 22 July 2016
- Country: India
- Language: Bengali

Khawto (English:Wound) is a 2016 Bengali erotic romantic thriller film directed by Kamaleshwar Mukherjee under the banner of Shree Venkatesh Films. The Film stars Prosenjit Chatterjee, Paoli Dam and Raima Sen in lead roles. The film was premiered on 21 July 2016 in Kolkata. The film met with positive reviews upon release.

== Plot ==
Lovebirds Sohag (Tridha Choudhury) and Rishav (Ronodeep Bose) cross paths with celebrated writer Nirbed Lahiri (Prosenjit Chatterjee) during a vacation to Koelphuli. In his isolated cottage, Nirbed, who had isolated himself from society for two decades, narrates his tale of lust and misadventures to the young couple.

== Cast ==
- Prosenjit Chatterjee as Nirbed Lahiri / Dhrubo
- Paoli Dam as Damayanti Chkaraborty / Antara
- Raima Sen as Srijita /Sri
- Tridha Choudhury as Sohaag
- Ronodeep Bose as Rishav
- Rahul Banerjee as Alokesh
- Mishka Halim as Bishakha
- Ushashie Chakraborty as Madhushree
- Padmanabha Dasgupta
- Aloke Mukherjee

== Soundtrack ==
This film's soundtrack composed by Anupam Roy.

Track listing
No.	Title	Singer	Length
1.	"Bhir Thele"	Anupam Roy	2:50
2.	"Kichu Toh Chaichi Na"	Kinjal, Ujjaini
