= Chotto Jigyasa =

1968 Indian Bengali drama film by Hrishikesh Mukherjee

Chhotto Jigyasa
- Directed by: Hrishikesh Mukherjee
- Screenplay by: Hrishikesh Mukherjee; Gauriprasanna Mazumder; Sachin Bhowmick
- Story by: Gauriprasanna Mazumder
- Produced by: Biswajit Chatterjee
- Starring: Prosenjit Chatterjee; Biswajit Chatterjee; Madhabi Mukherjee
- Cinematography: Dilip Ranjan Mukherjee
- Edited by: Hrishikesh Mukherjee
- Music by: Nachiketa Ghosh
- Production company: Trio Films
- Distributed by: Scaps Films
- Release date: 2 February 1968
- Running time: 100 minutes
- Country: India
- Language: Bengali

Chhotto Jigyasa (transl. Small Question) is a 1968 Indian Bengali-language children's drama film written and directed by Hrisikesh Mukherjee. Produced by Biswajit Chatterjee, the film is based on a story by Gauriprasanna Mazumder. It stars Chatterjee himself alongside Madhabi Mukherjee and Prosenjit Chatterjee in lead roles, whereas the latter marks his cinematic debut as a child artist in the film. It also stars Anup Kumar, Haradhan Banerjee, Gyanesh Mukherjee and Gita Dey in other supporting roles. The film follows Bumba, a crestfallen child, after losing his mother who is unable to cope with the fact that she will never return. One day, he visits a temple and assumes another woman to be his mother.

Chhotto Jigyasa theatrically released on 2 February 1968 and was a box office success. The soundtrack of the film was composed by Nachiketa Ghosh, with lyrics penned by Gauriprasanna Mazumder. Dilip Ranjan Mukherjee handled the cinematography and Hrishikesh Mukherjee himself edited the film.

In 1969, Chotto Jigyasa received the for Prosenjit Chatterjee at the BFJA Awards.

== Plot ==
Bumba, a 6 years old child, loses his mother, who has endured cancer for years. His father, Subimal, struggles grieving his wife's death and trying to explain the concept of death to a kindergartener.

Bumba, unable to come to terms with life without his mother finds ways to reach his mother like writing a letter and tying it to a balloon so it would reach heaven, asking to buy tickets to heaven. Bumba overhears his nanny talking about going to the temple to pray to "Maa" (goddess Durga) and goes with her thinking his mother now lives there.

In Dakshineswar Kali temple, he sees a woman being referred to as Maa by children begging for alms, he believes her to be his mother, and follows her around. After being referred to as "maa" multiple times she softens up and decides to take her home for his safety. Over the course of few hours they develop a mother-son attachment until Subimal's "Missing Son" is announced in the All India Radio and her family responds.

Eventually the woman's sorrowful life is revealed: her husband and two-year-old son died in a tragic accident. With time, Subimal falls deeply in love with her and expresses it. She confesses how she was afraid of revealing her feelings too, considering how her past would always remain a part of her. Subimal expresses how the past should not be forgotten and thus they decide to give their feelings a chance. Giving a wholesome ending.

== Cast ==
- Prosenjit Chatterjee as Bumba
- Biswajit Chatterjee as Subimal, Bumba's father
- Madhabi Mukherjee
- Haradhan Bandopadhyay
- Gita Dey
- Anup Kumar
- Gyanesh Mukherjee
- Suruchi Sengupta
- Prasad Mukherjee
- Shamita Biswas

== Awards ==
Awards	Year	Category	Recipient(s)	Ref
BFJA Awards	1969	Most Outstanding Work of the Year Award	Prosenjit Chatterjee	
