= Dhumketu (2025 film) =

2025 Bengali romantic thriller film by Kaushik Ganguly

- Poster
- Directed by: Kaushik Ganguly
- Written by: Kaushik Ganguly
- Screenplay by: Kaushik Ganguly
- Story by: Kaushik Ganguly
- Produced by: Rana Sarkar; Dev
- Starring: Dev; Subhashree Ganguly; Rudranil Ghosh
- Cinematography: Soumik Halder
- Edited by: Subhajit Singha
- Music by: Songs: Anupam Roy; Nilayan Chatterjee; Indraadip Dasgupta; Background score: Indraadip Dasgupta
- Production companies: Dag Creative Media; Dev Entertainment Ventures
- Distributed by: SSR Cinemas
- Release date: 14 August 2025
- Running time: 131 minutes
- Country: India
- Language: Bengali
- Budget: ₹4−6 crore
- Box office: ₹28.07 crore (Note: In India, including West Bengal, the net income is calculated by subtracting GST from the gross income of the film. The net income of the film is 23.04 crores, resulting in a gross income of almost 28.07 crores, including 18% GST.)

Dhumketu (Bengali pronunciation: [dʱum.ke.tu] transl. The Shooting Star) is a 2025 Indian Bengali-language romantic thriller film written and directed by Kaushik Ganguly. Produced by Rana Sarkar and Dev under the banners of Dag Creative Media and Dev Entertainment Ventures respectively, this film stars Dev himself alongside Subhashree Ganguly in lead roles, with Chiranjeet Chakraborty and Rudranil Ghosh assuming supporting roles and Parambrata Chatterjee in a special appearance. This movie follows Bhanu, a man long thought dead, who returns to his hometown on the eve of a suicide mission.

The film was announced in September 2015, marking the comeback of Dev and Subhashree as a leading pair in their sixth collaboration after Khoka 420 (2013). Principal Photography commenced in October 2015 and wrapped by in January 2017. Major parts of the film are shot in Nainital, with a few sequences filmed in Kolkata and Alipurduar. The soundtrack of the film is composed by Anupam Roy, and Indraadip Dasgupta provided its score. The cinematography of the film is handled by Soumik Halder, while Subhajit Singha edited the film.

Dhumketu was initially planned for release on 7 October 2016, on the occasion of Durga Puja, but was postponed due to unfinished post-production work. After a languishment in production hell for nine years, it was later theatrically released on 14 August 2025, coinciding with Independence day weekend. The film received positive reviews from the critics. Grossing over 28 crore, it emerged as the highest grossing Bengali film of 2025 and the second highest grossing Bengali film of all time, surpassing Dev's previous film Khadaan (2024).

== Plot ==
In 2015, Jogesh is kidnapped by an extremist group and is forced to keep one of their allies in his shelter. Later he finds out that this ally is none other than his childhood friend Bhanu.

Years ago, on the day of his father's retirement from school, Bhanu's younger brother Rabi had been killed in a forested area. However, the police closed the case without a proper investigation, telling his father to ensure Bhanu is safe because the killers are after him. Bhanu escapes from Mohangunj, his ancestral home, to Guwahati with the help of a tea estate manager, his father's friend; only to be reported dead in newspapers later on. His father was kidnapped and brutally tortured after Bhanu escaped the area.

Bhanu later joined an extremist group after escaping from home. Four years after he was reported dead, he is sent on a mission in the hills to perform a blast with suicide bombs at a prestigious high-profile rally; which means this is also his last mission. However, he insists on staying at his friend Jogesh's house and surveying the area; only to meet his family for one last time. He tells Jogesh not to ask a single question regarding his sudden disappearance and return. He takes the disguise of Indranath Khasnobis and becomes his father's morning walk partner. He later delivers him 25 lakh rupees, all of his savings to his father with the help of Jogesh, who worked at the post office.

Later on, he meets his wife Rupa, mother and his daughter Titli, whom he didn't even know of as Rupa was expecting two months after Bhanu left home. Jogesh tells him about Rupa's second marriage on the 28th, the same day when he is supposed to perform the blast, hearing which he is left shattered. He reminiscences all his memories with Rupa and meets her fiance Anindya, asking him to take good care of her and giving him a part of his savings too; for the well-being of Rupa and Titli. He also sends 5 lakh rupees to the tea estate manager out of gratitude.

Later on, he kills a politician's son, who had committed the murder of his brother and a corrupt police officer at Mohangunj police station, who had helped to cover up the case. Amidst curfew imposed on Mohangunj, the final date arrives, by which he meets everyone close to him in disguise of the old man Indranath Khasnobis, and leaves Mohangunj.

The final scene shows intercuts between Rupa and Anindya's marriage and the high-profile rally. The blast takes place at the rally, and Bhanu apparently dies.

== Cast ==
- Dev as Bhanu Singha / Indranath Khasnobis
- Subhashree Ganguly as Rupa, Bhanu's wife
- Chiranjeet Chakraborty as Indian Army Chief
- Rudranil Ghosh as Jogesh Chandra Sharma, Bhanu's childhood friend
- Dulal Lahiri as Surjo Singha, Bhanu's father
- Alokananda Roy as Bhanu's mother
- Masood Akhtar as Police inspector
- Ardhendu Banerjee as Doctor

=== Cameo appearance ===
- Parambrata Chatterjee as Anindya Mitra, Rupa's second husband

== Production ==
=== Development ===
When Dev had done a cameo in Kaushik Ganguly's directorial Jackpot (2009), both of them showed their interests to work with each other later. Ganguly needed a film with scope for Dev's stardom but would remain Ganguly's film. He wanted something Dev could not refuse. In 2012, there were reports of their collaboration on a gangster drama and early reports indicated that the film would be based on Alejandro González Iñárritu's neorealist Mexican film Amores perros (2000). It was proved to be a rumour and later in December 2014, Ganguly disclosed about his maiden collaboration with Dev. Dev revealed that he agreed "blindly" to star in the film without even listening to the story or his character. He revealed in an interview about Ganguly's choice that "when the master calls for the student you just say “yes”."

Ganguly revealed the concept of the film to be based on his own telefilm Ulka (2001), which was under the production of ETV Bangla. He wanted to present a realistic Dev, which he saw in Dui Prithibi (2010) and Buno Haansh (2014), without his style elements and larger-than-life image. According to him, the two months long kidnapping of K. Doraiswamy, an executive of the Indian Oil Corporation, inspired Ganguly to make the telefilm. The film was initially titled as Ulka Patan (transl. Meteor fall), while Dev later suggested to change it as Dhumketu, which was ultimately finalised.

=== Pre-production ===
Ganguly had met Dev ten months prior to the announcement and narrated a one-liner, which the latter requested to develop. After completing the development in early-February 2015, Ganguly met Dev again later that month and narrated the subject. Ganguly himself wrote the film's script dialogues. Dev made his debut as a producer with the film and launched his production house Dev Entertainment Ventures, while Rana Sarkar of Dag Creative Media also joined the team as its co-producer.

The same month, Soumik Halder was announced as cinematographer, in his third collaboration with Ganguly after working on Khaad (2014) and Chotoder Chobi (2014). Indraadip Dasgupta was confirmed to compose the background score, in his third consecutive film with the director after Apur Panchali (2013), Khaad and Chotoder Chobi. Judo Ramu and Rocky Rajesh were hired to design some action sequences in the film. A muhurat puja was held on 28 September 2015 at the office of Dag Creative Media in Kolkata with the film's cast and crew.

Dev played two distinct roles in the film: the 80-year-old Bhanu Singha, and the 30-year-old version of him. He reportedly gained 30 kg and weighed 98 kg to play the older role, and then lost the weight to play the younger one. Dev also was asked to sport a clean-shaven look like a part of his role.

=== Casting ===
Subhashree Ganguly successfully auditioned for the leading female role in the project and was signed on to make her reunion with Dev two years after Khoka 420 (2013), marking their fifth collaboration as a pair. Chiranjeet Chakraborty was cast for an important role in the film, which was later revealed to be a mentor-like. For an important role, Rudranil Ghosh was cast and Parambrata Chatterjee was reported to have a cameo in the film.

=== Filming ===
Principal photography of the film commenced on 26 October 2015 with its Kolkata schedule and continued for 4 days. The second schedule was expected to begin on 5 November in Nainital, while it was halted as Federation of Cine Technicians and Workers of Eastern India (FCTWEI) had asked its members as well as the technicians not to work in the film. Aparna Ghatak, the General Secretary of the association, claimed that Rana Sarkar informed about the shooting by sending a mail on 1 November 2015 (4 days before the filming would begin), whereas it was a violation of their rules as the regulation states that informing about an outdoor shooting is necessary to be done at least 15 days before. Besides, the shooting was halted because Sarkar resigned his membership with Eastern India Motion Pictures Association (EIMPA), as he didn't paid several artists from the set of his TV production Byomkesh (2014-15), also without abiding by the rules by the association. Normalcy prevailed later when he renewed his membership and the filming began from the aforementioned date.

On 11 November 2015, the song "Gaane Gaane" was shot at Khoorpatal, Nainital.

== Music ==
The soundtrack of the film has been primarily composed by Anupam Roy, with additional compositions by Indraadip Dasgupta and Nilayan Chatterjee; the film marks Anupam's fifth collaboration with Ganguly after Rang Milanti (2011), Laptop (2012), Drishtikone (2018) and Ajogyo (2024), and sixth collaboration with Dev after Zulfiqar (2016), Chaamp (2017), Sanjhbati (2019), Projapati (2022) and Pradhan (2023), while Nilayan collaborated with the latter for the fifth time after Kishmish (2022), Kachher Manush (2022), Bagha Jatin (2023) and Khadaan (2024). Dasgupta also provided its original score, in his collaborations for the eleventh time with both Ganguly and Dev, with the former after working on Apur Panchali (2013), Khaad (2014), Chotoder Chobi (2015), Bastu-Shaap (2015), Cinemawala (2016), Chhaya O Chhobi (2017), Kishore Kumar Junior (2018), Bijoya (2019), Lantrani (2024) and Ajogyo (2024), and with latter on Le Chakka (2010), Dui Prithibi (2010), Chander Pahar (2013), Yoddha (2014), Shudhu Tomari Jonyo (2015), Kelor Kirti (2016), Zulfiqar (2016), Chaamp (2017), Amazon Obhijaan (2017) and Kabir (2018). The lyrics have been penned by Anupam and Nilayan themselves for their respective compositions, while Ritam Sen wrote for the rest.

The soundtrack preceded with seven tracks: "Gaane Gaane" was the first to be released on 7 July 2025, which was followed by "Maa" on 24 July 2025, "Hobe Na Dekha?" on 1 August 2025, "Smriti Phatoley" on 19 August 2025, "Nei Kono Dewa Newa" on 26 August 2025, and "Gaane Gaane–Reprise" on 11 December 2025.

== Release ==
The film was initially announced for its release on 7 October 2016, coinciding with Durga Puja; however it was later postponed to avoid clashing with another Dev starrer Zulfiqar (2016), and scheduled for its release on 23 December 2016. The film was again postponed and went into production limbo for five years. After amendments between the producer and the lead actors, the film was later released on 14 August 2025, on the occasion of Independence Day.

== Marketing ==
The teaser of the film was dropped on 23 June 2025. The trailer was released on 4 August 2025. On 13 August 2025, the director Kaushik Ganguly along with Dev and Subhasree, visited the Boro Maa Kali Temple, Naihati as a part of their promotional campaign and to seek blessings for the success of Dhumketu.

== Reception ==
=== Box office ===
Dhumketu crossed over ₹2.18 crore on its opening day, which is the highest first day box office for an Indian Bengali film. It crossed ₹5.20 on the second day and became the fastest Bengali film to enter the ₹5 crore club in Bengali cinema. It crossed ₹10.16 crore at the end of four days and became the fastest Bengali film to enter into the ₹10 crore club in Bengali cinema. It crossed over ₹21.36 crore at the end of eight days.

=== Critical reception ===
Agnivo Niyogi of The Telegraph reviewed the film and wrote "Despite its long delay, the film retains a freshness in look and feel, aided by its scenic locations, crisp editing and organic performances. While there are nuanced takes on themes of patriotism and insurgency, the focus largely remains on human relationships." He praised Kaushik Ganguly's screenplay, Dev's performance, Rudranil's performance and chemistry with Dev, an unforced sense of nostalgia and the emotional music but bemoaned the prosthetics, excessive background score and the always not necessary presence of songs. Sampali Moulik of Sangbad Pratidin reviewed the film and highlighted "Watching the film instills a sense of nostalgia in your mind, which makes you feel - Life can rewrite the meolody of old love." She praised the cinematography, screenplay, Dev's dialogues and performance, Rudranil's acting, the nostalgic chemistry between Dev-Subhashree and the songs but bemoaned the occasional mask like appearance of the prosthetic.

Kasturi Kundu of The Indian Express reviewed the film opined "Dhumketu is a strange nostalgic juxtaposition of love, separation and friendship." She praised the nostalgia evoking portrayal and performance of Dev, his chemistry with Subhasree, the bromance between Dev and Rudranil and the short cameo of Chiranjeet Chakraborty. Shatakshi Ganguly of IWMBuzz rated the film 3.5 out of 5 stars and noted "Dhumketu doesn’t hustle to engrave or dazzle. It moves at its own muted pace, darting on time lost and the convoluted pull of coming back." She praised the cinematography, Dev's performance and natural body language in his old age role, his chemistry with Subhashree and Rudranil, and Anupam's music but bemoaned the storytelling for not being very smooth between the present and past flashbacks. Arshi of Filmydrip reviewed the film and wrote "The story has been represented very well due to which you will feel complete connectivity with all the characters and along with that when the pair of Dev and Subhashree comes in front, the audience becomes completely crazy about the film. A good story, along with that a pair liked by the audience and then the good work of the makers, the best film has been made which is successful in casting its magic on the audience."

Poorna Banerjee of The Times of India rated the film 3.5/5 stars and wrote "Dhumketu is a rewarding cinematic experience for those who appreciate character-driven storytelling set in evocative landscapes. Despite its imperfections, it leaves a lasting impression." She applauded the cinematography, the camaderie between Dev and Rudranil and Dev-Subhashree's palpable chemistry but bemoaned the uneven script. Avik of The Watchlist Diaries rated the film 4.5 out of 5 stars and quoted "The film flips between past and present a lot of times in the first half. But in the second half, this flip becomes less and the pace drops, which may bore you. There’s a dream sequence featuring an avalanche, it’s shot so beautifully that it will be hard to believe that it’s from a 10-year-old movie." He further appreciated Dev and Rudranil's method acting in their respective styles.

Susmita Dey of Ei Samay reviewed the film on a positive note, quoting "Kaushik Ganguly wisely didn't treat the story as a political thriller set in the context of Northeast India and North Bengal in the shadow of films like Dil Se (1998). Rather, if it had belonged to the genre, the absence of this ideological construction process would've undoubtedly left a big gap".

== Future ==
At the end of the film, the title card reads 'A Story Unfinished...', hinting at a sequel. The director in various post-release interviews teased Dhumketu 2.
