= Chotoder Chobi =

2014 Indian Bengali film

- Chotoder Chobi film poster
- Directed by: Kaushik Ganguly
- Starring: Dulal Sarkar; Deblina Roy
- Cinematography: Soumik Haldar
- Edited by: Bodhaditya Banerjee
- Music by: Indradeep Dasgupta
- Production company: Shree Venkatesh Films
- Distributed by: Shree Venkatesh Films
- Release dates: 11 December 2014 (Dubai International Film Festival); 23 January 2015
- Country: India
- Language: Bengali

Chotoder Chobi (English: A story about small people) is a 2014 Indian Bengali language feature film directed by Kaushik Ganguly. The film stars Dulal Sarkar and Deblina Roy in the lead roles. The film is directed by Ganguly and follows his earlier work on Laptop, Shabdo, Apur Panchali and Khaad. The plot revolves around the lives and opinions of a group of dwarfs who work as jokers in a circus. The film was released on 23 January 2015. Produced by Shrikant Mohta of Shree Venkatesh Films, the film's music was scored by Indradeep Dasgupta. The main cast as well as supporting actors were previously non-actors but Sarkar, one of the lead actors in the film, was awarded the Best Actor award at the 45th International Film Festival of India. It won the National Film Award for Best Film on Other Social Issues.

== Plot ==
After a horrific accident while performing a stunt for the circus, trapeze artist Shibu finds himself restricted to his bed. In compensation, the manager agrees to pay only ₹ 15,000 to Shibu's family, which according to Shibu's juniors is a minuscule amount. They are angry but helpless as the only source of regular income for them is the circus. Sympathizing with the struggle of Shibu and his family, Khoka (Dulal Sarkar), Shibu's closest friend, decides to protest against the manager and hence leaves his job and take on total responsibility for Shibu's family. The family struggles with social apathy towards dwarves and poverty then takes a turn when Khoka realizes that he is in love with Shibu's daughter, Soma (Debalina Roy).

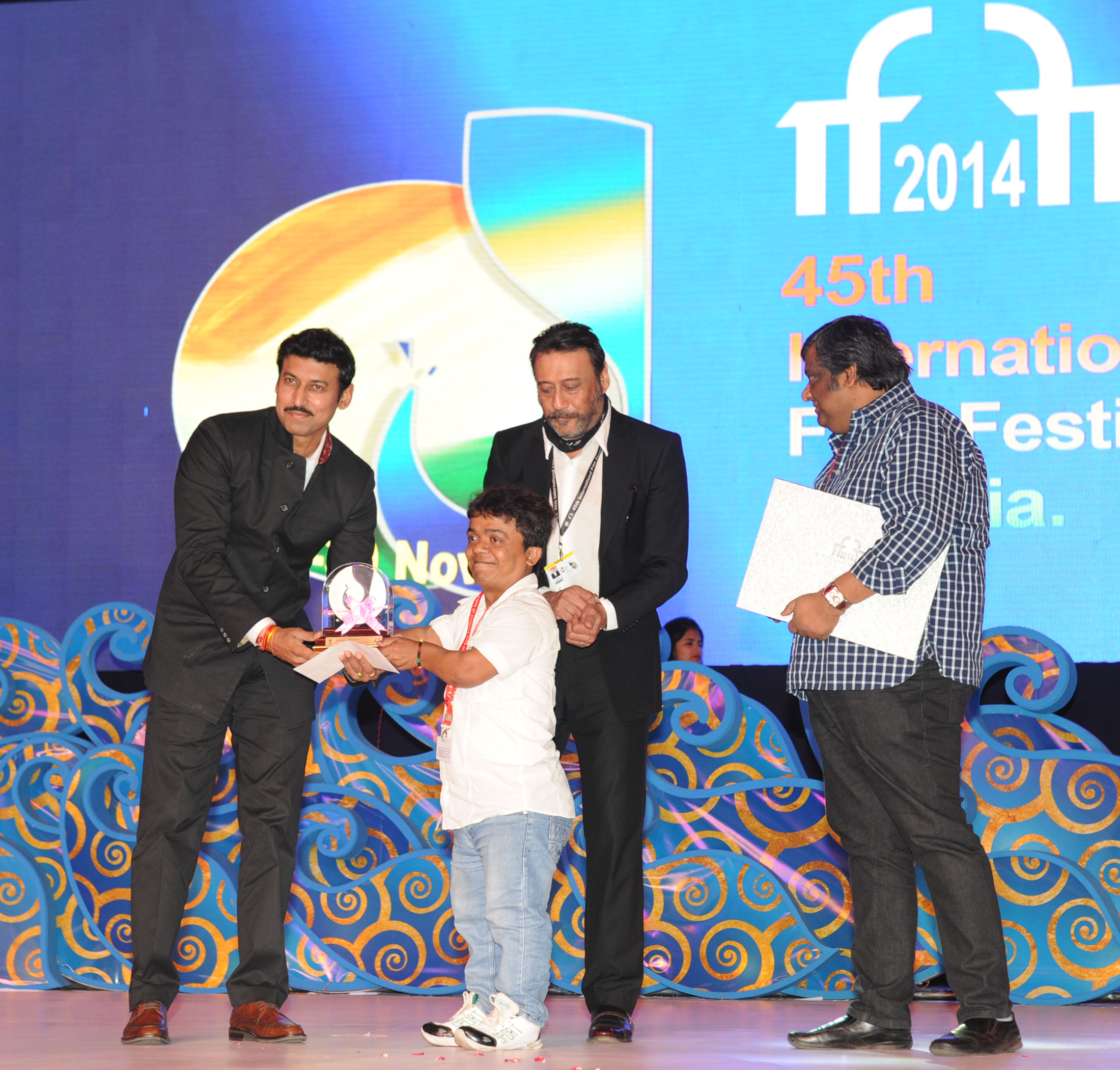
Film crew at IFFI (2014)

== Awards ==
At the 45th International Film Festival of India in Goa, Dulal Sarkar, was awarded the best actor award for his role in the film. It was Ganguly's third film following Arekti Premer Golpo and Apur Panchali, which received awards at the International Film Festival of India.
