= Sirsha Ray =

Indian cinematographer

Sirsha Ray is an Indian cinematographer who works in Bengali, Hindi, Telugu and Tamil films. He collaborated with Aparna Sen, Kaushik Ganguly, Srijit Mukherji, Sujoy Ghosh, Suman Mukhopadhyay, Churni Ganguly and Raj Chakraborty. Some of his notable works include A Death in the Gunj, Nirbashito, Arshinagar, Shabdo, Maati and Rocketry: The Nambi Effect.

== Filmography ==
=== Films ===
Year	Film	Director	Language	Ref
2000	Ek Je Aachhe Kanya	Subrata Sen	Bengali	
2002	Swapner Feriwala	Subrata Sen	Bengali	
2002	Desh	Raja Sen	Bengali	
2003	Nil Nirjane	Subrata Sen	Bengali	
2004	Iti Srikanta	Anjan Das	Bengali	
2005	Home Delivery	Sujoy Ghosh	Hindi	
2006	Andhakarer Shabdo	Ashoke Viswanathan	Bengali	
2006	Faltu	Anjan Das	Bengali	
2007	Jara Bristite Bhijechhilo	Anjan Das	Bengali	
2009	Aladin	Sujoy Ghosh	Hindi	
2010	Clerk	Subhadra Chowdhury	Bengali	
2010	Dui Prithibi	Raj Chakraborty	Bengali	
2011	Necklace	Sekhar Das	Bengali	
2011	U R My Jaan	Arun Govil	Hindi	
2011	Faande Poriya Boga Kaande Re	Soumik Chattopadhyay	Bengali	
2011	Jaani Dyakha Hawbe	Birsa Dasgupta	Bengali	
2012	Khokababu	Shankar Aiyya	Bengali	
2012	Charuulata 2011	Agnidev Chatterjee	Bengali	
2012	Laptop	Kaushik Ganguly	Bengali	
2012	Doshhomi	Suman Maitra	Bengali	
2012	3 Kanya	Agnidev Chatterjee	Bengali	
2013	Shabdo	Kaushik Ganguly	Bengali	
2013	Goyenda Gogol	Arindam Dey	Bengali	
2013	Mrs. Sen	Agnidev Chatterjee	Bengali	
2013	C/O Sir	Kaushik Ganguly	Bengali	
2013	Alik Sukh	Nandita Roy & Shiboprosad Mukherjee	Bengali	
2013	Ekti Rahasya Golpo	Sekhar Das	Bengali	
2014	Apur Panchali	Kaushik Ganguly	Bengali	
2014	Chaya Manush	Arindam Dey	Bengali	
2014	Ramdhanu	Nandita Roy & Shiboprosad Mukherjee	Bengali	
2014	Chaar	Sandip Ray	Bengali	
2014	Hrid Majharey	Ranjan Ghosh	Bengali	
2014	Nirbashito	Churni Ganguly	Bengali	
2014	Badshahi Angti	Sandip Ray	Bengali	
2015	Ebar Shabor	Arindam Sil	Bengali	
2015	Roga Howar Sohoj Upay	Debaloy Bhattacharya	Bengali	
2015	Saari Raat	Aparna Sen	Hindi	
2015	Shesher Kobita	Suman Mukhopadhyay	Bengali	
2015	Katmundu	Raj Chakraborty	Bengali	
2015	Arshinagar	Aparna Sen	Bengali	
2016	Monchora	Sandip Ray	Bengali	
2016	Shororipu	Ayan Chakraborty	Bengali	
2016	Double Feluda	Sandip Ray	Bengali	
2017	Sonata	Aparna Sen	Bengali	
2017	A Death in the Gunj	Konkona Sen Sharma	English	
2017	Rongberonger Korhi	Ranjan Ghosh	Bengali	
2017	Amar Aponjon	Raja Chanda	Bengali	
2018	Maati	Leena Gangopadhyay & Saibal Banerjee	Bengali	
2018	Helicopter Eela	Pradeep Sarkar	Hindi	
2019	Nagarkirtan	Kaushik Ganguly	Bengali	
2019	Shankar Mudi	Aniket Chattopadhyay	Bengali	
2019	Jyeshthoputro	Kaushik Ganguly	Bengali	
2019	Sita	Teja	Telugu	
2019	Sanjhbati	Leena Gangopadhyay & Saibal Banerjee	Bengali	
2020	Shironam	Indranil Ghosh	Bengali	
2021	Dictionary	Bratya Basu	Bengali	
2022	Rocketry: The Nambi Effect	R. Madhavan	Tamil/Hindi/English	
2022	Shabaash Mithu	Srijit Mukherji	Hindi	
2022	Agantuk	Indraadip Dasgupta	Bengali	
2025	Raat Akeli Hai: The Bansal Murders	Honey Trehan	Hindi	

=== Web series ===
Year	Film	Director	Language	Ref
2022	Human	Vipul Amrutlal Shah	Hindi	
2022	Mithya	Rohan Sippy	Hindi	
2023	Commando	Vipul Amrutlal Shah	Hindi	

== Awards ==
- Filmfare Award for Best Cinematography for A Death in the Gunj
