= Prabuddha Banerjee =

Indian music director and film composer

Prabuddha Banerjee is an Indian music director and film composer who primarily works in Bengali films. He collaborated with some well known directors like Kaushik Ganguly, Suman Mukhopadhyay, Indranil Roychowdhury, Srijit Mukherji and Bratya Basu.

== Discography ==
Year	Film	Director	Ref
2003	Bhalo Theko	Goutam Halder	
2008	Via Darjeeling	Arindam Nandy	
2010	Ekti Tarar Khonje	Avik Mukhopadhyay	
2011	Abosheshey	Aditi Roy	
2013	Phoring	Indranil Roychowdhury	
2016	Bhalobashar Shohor	Indranil Roychowdhury	
2018	Ka Kha Ga Gha	Dr. Krishnendu Chatterjee	
2018	Debi	Anam Biswas	
2019	Nagarkirtan	Kaushik Ganguly	
2019	Jyeshthoputro	Kaushik Ganguly	
2019	Posham Pa	Suman Mukhopadhyay	
2019	Surjo Prithibir Chardike Ghore	Arijit Biswas	
2020	Nazarband	Suman Mukhopadhyay	
2021	Dictionary	Bratya Basu	
2022	Abhijaan	Parambrata Chatterjee	
2022	Belashuru	Nandita Roy & Shiboprosad Mukherjee	
2022	Lokkhi Chele	Kaushik Ganguly	
2022	Haami 2	Nandita Roy & Shiboprosad Mukherjee	
2023	Kaberi Antardhan	Kaushik Ganguly	
2023	Mayar Jonjal	Indranil Roychowdhury	
2023	Ghore Pherar Gaan	Aritra Sen	
2023	Raktabeej	Nandita Roy & Shiboprosad Mukherjee	
2024	Hubba	Bratya Basu	
2024	Oti Uttam	Srijit Mukherji	
2024	Alaap	Premendu Bikash Chaki	
2024	Putul Nacher Itikotha	Suman Mukhopadhyay	

== Awards ==
- National Film Award for Best Music Direction for Jyeshthoputro
