= Lily Chakravarty =

Indian actress

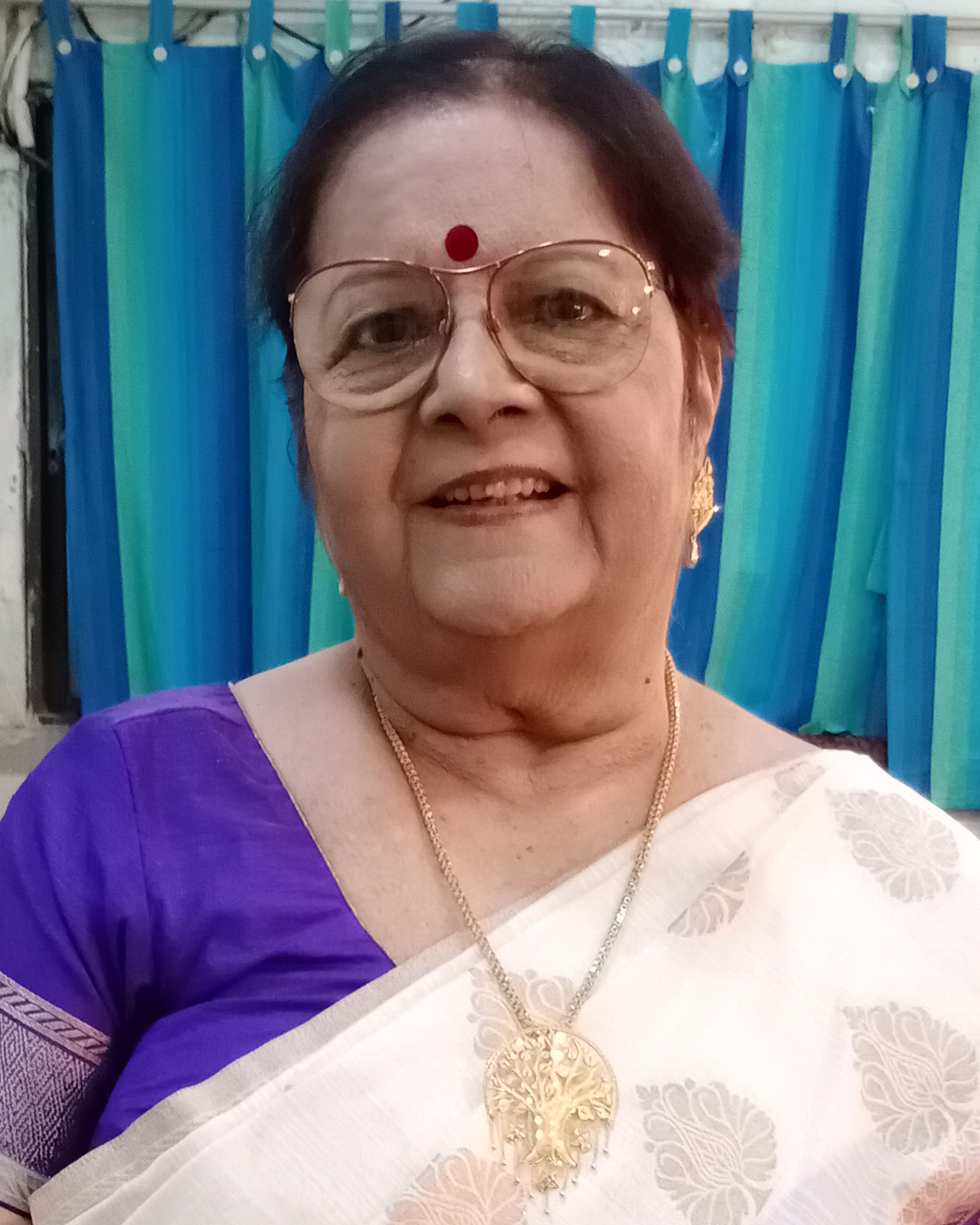
- Lily Chakravarty
- Born: 8 August 1941 (age 85)
- Occupation: Actress
- Notable work: Deya Neya, Jana Aranya, Chupke Chupke, Chokher Bali, Shikari, Rajkahini
- Spouse: Ajit Kumar Ghosh

Lily Chakravarty is an Indian actress. She worked in many Bengali and Hindi films. She made her screen debut in the Bengali film Bhanu Pelo Lottery (1958).

== Career ==
Lily debuted in the Bengali movie Bhanu Pelo Lottery in 1958, where she played the role of Maya, a typist. Lily, in her long career, acted in many films. She shared the Best Supporting Actress award for her role in the film Sanjhbati with Sudiptaa Chakraborty, who won it for her role in Jyesthoputro, in the West Bengal Film Journalist Association Award 2020.

== Personal life ==
Chakravarty is married to Indian businessman Ajit Kumar Ghosh.

== Filmography ==
Year	Title	Notes
1958	Bhanu Pelo Lottery	
1962	Bipasha	
1963	Deya Neya	
1965	Kanch Kata Hirey	
1967	Kedar Raja	
1970	Mahakabi Krittibas	
1970	Ei Korechho Bhalo	
1970	Priya	Malayalam film
1970	Deshbandhu Chittaranjan	
1971	Pratham Basanta	
1971	Janani	
1971	Bhanu Goenda Jahar Assistant	
1972	Shesh Parba	
1973	Achanak	
1974	Phuleswari	
1974	Chhandapatan	
1975	Mausam	
1975	Chupke Chupke	
1976	Jana Aranya	
1977	Inkaar	
1977	Alaap	
1977	Bhola Moira	
1978	Dui Purush	
1979	Sabuj Dwiper Raja	
1979	Dub De Mon Kali Bole	
1979	Debdas	
1980	Gopal Bhanrh	
1980	Darpachurna	
1981	Kalankini Kankabati	
1982	Swarna Mahal	
1982	Subho Rajani	
1982	Sonar Bangla	
1982	Sati Sabitri Satyaban	
1982	Pipasa	
1982	Matir Swarga	
1982	Amritakumbher Sandhane	
1983	Samapti	
1983	Pratidan	
1983	Mata Aagameswari	
1984	Uncle	
1984	Prarthana	
1984	Mohanar Dike	
1984	Bishabriksha	
1985	Tagari	
1985	Sonar Sansar	
1986	Tin Purush	
1986	Basundhara	
1987	Radharani	
1988	Agnisanket	
1989	Aghat	
1989	Nishibadhu	
1989	Aghatan Ajo Ghate	
1990	Monmayuri	
1990	Ek Din Achanak	
1991	Ananda	
1992	Swet Patharer Thala	
1992	Prem	
1992	Natun Sansar	
1992	Mayabini	
1992	Bedenir Prem	
1992	Adhikar	
1992	Shakha Prashakha	
1993	Phire Paoa	
1993	Badhu	
1993	Atithi Shilpi	
1994	Salma Sundari	
1994	Nilanjana	
1994	Danga	
1994	Biswas Abiswas	
1994	Ami O Maa	
1994	Uttoran	Guest appearance
1995	Sukher Asha	
1995	Sansar Sangram	
1995	Naginkanya	
1996	Shunya Theke Shuru	
1996	Nikhonj	
1996	Beyadap	
1997	Yoddha	
1997	Ekaler Kalpurush	
1998	Ranakshetra	
1998	Mayer Adhikar	
1998	Ganga	
1998	Bishnu Narayan	
1999	Sundar Bou	
1999	Niyoti	
1999	Anupama	
2000	Pita Swarga Pita Dharma	
2000	Didi Aamar Maa	
2000	Aamader Sansar	
2001	Shesh Ashray	
2001	Shasti	
2001	Buk Bhara Bhalobasa	
2001	Bhalobasa Ki Aage Bujhini	
2002	Jiban Yuddha	
2002	Filhaal	
2002	Ferari Fouj	
2002	Bor Kone	
2002	Anamni Angana	
2003	Chokher Bali	
2004	Sindurer Bandhan	
2004	Tobu Bhalobasi	
2005	Tista	
2005	Til Theke Tal	
2005	Babu Mashai	
2006	Herbert	
2007	Pitribhumi	
2008	Janatar Aadalat	
2009	Swartha	
2010	Antarbas	
2014	Khaad	
2015	Jogajog	
2015	Rajkahini	
2016	Shikari	
2016	Posto	
2017	Sesh Chithi	
2017	Bibaho Diaries	
2018	Generation Ami	
2019	Durgeshgorer Guptodhon	
2019	Sanjhbati	
2019	Tumi O Tumi	
2020	Rawkto Rawhoshyo	
2021	Abalamban	
2022	Kishmish	
2023	Ardhangini	
2024	Ajogyo	
2025	Dhumketu	
2026	Aajo Ardhangini	

== Television ==
- Dwiragaman (Zee Bangla)
- Tumi Robe Nirobe (Zee Bangla)
- Goyenda Ginni (Zee Bangla)
- Bhootu (Zee Bangla)
- Neem Phooler Madhu (Zee Bangla)

== Web series ==
Year	Title	Role	Language	Network	Notes
2020	Forbidden Love	Shanti Aunty	Hindi	ZEE5	
