= Jaani Dyakha Hawbe =

2011 Indian Bengali film

- Theatrical release poster
- Directed by: Birsa Dasgupta
- Story by: Angshuman Chakraborty
- Produced by: Namit Bajoria
- Starring: Parambrata Chatterjee; Payel Sarkar; Anjan Dutt; Roopa Ganguly; Mamata Shankar
- Cinematography: Sirsha Ray Soumik Haldar
- Edited by: Bodhaditya Banerjee
- Music by: Indradeep Dasgupta; Neel Dutt Anupam Roy
- Production company: Cine Nine
- Release date: 25 November 2011 (Kolkata)
- Country: India
- Language: Bengali

Jaani Dyakha Hawbe is a 2011 Bengali film directed by Birsa Dasgupta and produced under the banner of Cine Nine. The film features actors Parambrata Chatterjee and Payel Sarkar in the lead roles. The musical score was composed by Indradeep Dasgupta.

== Plot ==
Megh wants to be a musician and Hiya is an aspiring model. But both of them couldn't really establish themselves. They meet at a bookstore and fall in love. But a time comes when they had to give more time to their careers rather than their love. This resulted in a break-up, with its ill-effects on their lives. It was too late when they realised that they could not stay without each other.

Pat is a photographer who handles Hiya's portfolio. He promised Hiya to help her in establishing her career, but later turned out to be a liar who used her for some personal gains. On the other hand, Megh was trying to make an album under the label of Octane, a music company. One of its members was Minakshi, who tried to help Megh. Megh stayed on rent at Nirupama's place. It turned out that her ex-lover Ishwar became the drinking partner of Megh. When Nirupama was out of station, Ishwar secretly resided at her house with Megh, as both he and Nirupama didn't want to face each other. Ishwar was a poor man with no money and in fact, he had none in this world whom he could call as his own, except Nirupama. Their past turned out to be similar as of Megh and Hiya. Ishwar's original intention was to reunite Megh and Hiya. He was later helped by Nirupama, and meanwhile, both of them realised that they still loved each other. Finally, they were successful in their mission and all the four lives lived happily thereafter.

== Cast ==
- Parambrata Chatterjee as Megh
- Payel Sarkar as Hiya
- Anjan Dutt as Ishwar
- Roopa Ganguly as Minakshi
- Mamata Shankar as Nirupama
- June Malia
- Shiboprosad Mukherjee as Pat
- Arijit Dutta
- Arijit Roy

== Soundtrack ==
Jaani Dyakha Hawbe

Soundtrack album by Indradeep Dasgupta, Neel Dutt
- Released: 29 October 2011
- Recorded: 2011
- Genre: Feature film soundtrack
- Length: 39:55

Indradeep Dasgupta chronology
Chaplin (2011)	Jaani Dyakha Hawbe (2011)	Mone Pore Aajo Seidin (2011)

Neel Dutt chronology
Rang Milanti (2011)	Jaani Dyakha Hawbe (2011)	Flop-E (2012)

Indradeep Dasgupta and Neel Dutt composed the film score of Jaani Dyakha Hawbe. Lyrics are penned by Srijato and Angshuman Chakraborty. Music launch of the film took place at the INOX complex at Forum Mall, Kolkata. Singer Anupam Roy worked under another music director for the first time with this film, the rest all of his songs being his own compositions. Crew members like Payel Sarkar, Parambrata Chatterjee, Indradeep Dasgupta, Neel Dutt, Srijato and singer Kaushiki Chakrabarty were present during the music launch.

=== Track listing ===
No.	Title	Lyrics	Music	Singer(s)	Length
1.	"Thik Thakish"	Srijato	Indradeep Dasgupta	Monali Thakur, Anupam Roy	4:46
2.	"Jaani Dekha Hobe (Male)"	Srijato	Indradeep Dasgupta	Anupam Roy	6:11
3.	"Neel Megh Mashe"	Angshuman Chakraborty	Neel Dutt	Anupam Roy	4:18
4.	"Phire Jaa Re Mon Ja"	Srijato	Indradeep Dasgupta	Kaushiki Chakrabarty	6:28
5.	"Teen Buror Gaan"	Angshuman Chakraborty	Neel Dutt	Anjan Dutt	4:31
6.	"Jaani Dekha Hobe (Female)"	Srijato	Indradeep Dasgupta	Shreya Ghoshal	6:09
7.	"Jaani Dekha Hobe (Reprise)"	Srijato	Indradeep Dasgupta	Anupam Roy	7:32
Total length:					39:55

=== Reception ===
Soundtrack of Jaani Dyakha Hawbe was well received by critics. Reviewers of The Times of India wrote, "Music by Indradeep Dasgupta and Neel Dutt is another highpoint, especially Shreya Ghoshal's "Jaani Dyakha Hawbe" number. Indraadip goes a commendable job of using parts of the "Jo Wada Kiya Woh" in this song. Srijato excels yet again with his lyrics, especially that of "Phire Jaa" ("Megheder kachhe ghum jome achhe/jolchhobi aanka balishe/abchaya bnaake peyechhi tomake/aadore aar nalishe")." Similarly, critics of Washington Bangla Radio on Internet wrote, "The title track, with its interesting use of the evergreen "Jo Waada Kiya" is hummable. Neel’s best compositions seem to be reserved for his dad Anjan Dutt’s movies (somewhat similar to how we only get the best of Rajesh Roshan in Rakesh Roshan-directed films)."

== Critical reception ==
Professional ratings
Review scores
Source	Rating
Gomolo	3.5/5 stars
The Times of India	3/5 stars
The Indian Express	3/5 stars
Internet Movie Database	5.8/10 stars

Jaani Dyakha Hawbe received average remarks from critics and reviewers. Critics of Washington Bangla Radio on Internet said, "Birsa is an accomplished storyteller, but if he really wants to enter the realm of mainstream cinema, he has to try again. The movie has an open-ended climax, with the audience left to judge whether Hiya and Megh actually become a couple once again, or whether it is all an extended, tragic, dream. The problem is, the viewers had stopped caring a long time back." Gomolo users rated it 3.5 out of 5 stars. Reviewers of The Times of India rated it 3 out of 5 stars and stating that Birsa didn't go deep into exploring the dynamics of relationships and the predicaments of some of his characters are often left unexplained. Shoma A. Chatterji of The Indian Express commented, "Strong technique, weak content".

== Awards ==
Year	Nominee	Award	Category	Result
2011	Shreya Ghoshal	Mirchi Music Awards Bangla	Best Female Vocalist of The Year	Won
