= National Film Award for Best Music Direction =

State-instituted annual film awards in India

- National award for contributions to Indian Cinema
- Awarded for: Best Music Direction and background score for a feature film of the year
- Sponsored by: National Film Development Corporation of India
- Rewards: Rajat Kamal (Silver Lotus); ₹2,00,000
- First award: 1967 (Songs); 1994 (Background music)
- Most recent winner: Shashwat Sachdev (Songs); G. V. Prakash Kumar (Background music)

Highlights
- Most wins: A. R. Rahman (7)

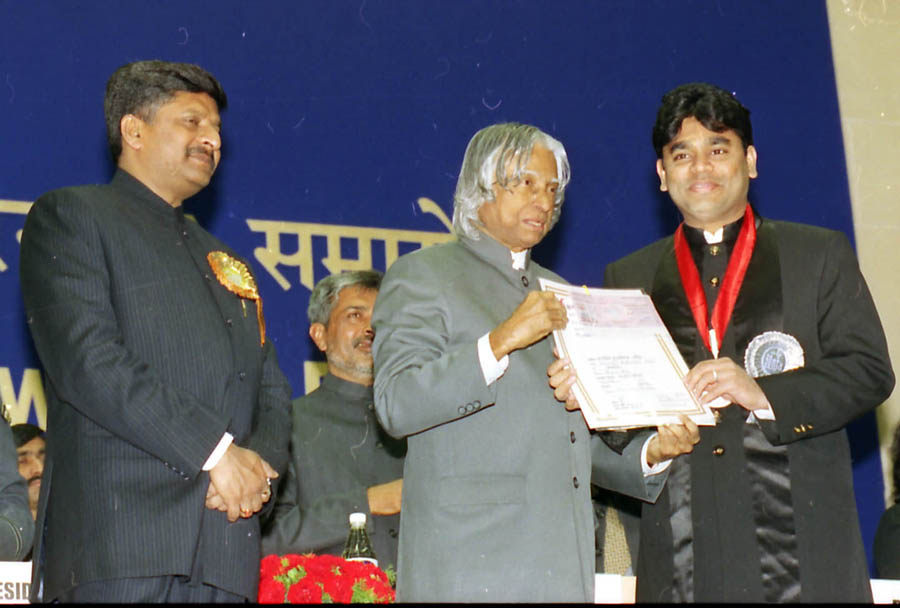
President Dr. A. P. J. Abdul Kalam, presenting the national film award for best music direction, year of 2002 to A. R. Rahman for the Tamil film, Kannathil Muthamittal.

The National Film Award for Best Music Direction (the Silver Lotus Award) is an honour presented annually at the National Film Awards by the National Film Development Corporation of India to a musician who has composed the best score for films produced within the Indian film industry. The award was first introduced at the 15th National Film Awards in 1967. At the 42nd National Film Awards, an award for "Best Background Score" was instituted. It was however discontinued after that, and it was not until 2009 that the category was re-introduced. Later, during the 70th National Film Awards both the categories — Best Background Score and Best Background Music were clubbed together and named as "Best Background Music". A total of 51 awards—including award for Best Background music—to 40 different composers. The first recipient of the award was K. V. Mahadevan who was honoured for his composition in the Tamil film Kandan Karunai (1967). A. R. Rahman is the most frequent winner having won 7 awards.

A. R. Rahman is also the only composer to have received a national award in his debut movie itself. Ilaiyaraaja has won it 5 times. Jaidev and Vishal Bhardwaj have won it three times each. Four musicians—B. V. Karanth, K.V. Mahadevan, Satyajit Ray, Johnson and M. M. Keeravani have won the award twice each. Ilaiyaraaja is the only composer to have won the award for achieving in three different languages — Telugu, Tamil and Malayalam. While A. R. Rahman won the award for performing in two different languages — Tamil and Hindi (including one for his debut film) Roja (1992). (Note: The jury of the 40th National Film Awards were tied between Rahman and Ilaiyaraaja—for Thevar Magan—before Balu Mahendra, the chairman voted in favour of Rahman.)

Johnson won the inaugural "Best Background Score" award—for Sukrutham—in 1994. When the award was reinstated in 2009, Ilaiyaraaja won it for the Malayalam film Pazhassi Raja.

Although the Indian film industry produces films in around 20 languages and dialects, the recipients of the award include those who have worked in seven major languages: Hindi (19 awards), Tamil (12 awards), Telugu (10 awards), Malayalam (9 awards), Bengali (7 awards), Kannada (5 awards) and Marathi (2 awards).

== Winners ==
Indicates winner for Best Background music

List of award recipients, showing the year (award ceremony), film(s) and language(s)
Year	Recipient(s)	Film(s)	Language	Refs.
1967 (15th)	K. V. Mahadevan	Kandan Karunai	Tamil	
1968 (16th)	Kalyanji Anandji	Saraswatichandra	Hindi	
1969 (17th)	S. Mohinder	Nanak Nam Jahaz Hai	Punjabi	
1970 (18th)	Madan Mohan	Dastak	Hindi	
1971 (19th)	Jaidev	Reshma Aur Shera	Hindi	
1972 (20th)	Sachin Dev Burman	Zindagi Zindagi	Hindi	
1973 (21st)	Satyajit Ray	Ashani Sanket	Bengali	
1974 (22nd)	Ananda Shankar	Chorus	Bengali	
1975 (23rd)	Bhupen Hazarika	Chameli Memsaab	Assamese	
1976 (24th)	B. V. Karanth	Rishya Shringa	Kannada	
1977 (25th)	B. V. Karanth	Ghatashraddha	Kannada	
1978 (26th)	Jaidev	Gaman	Hindi	
1979 (27th)	K. V. Mahadevan	Sankarabharanam	Telugu	
1980 (28th)	Satyajit Ray	Hirak Rajar Deshe	Bengali	
1981 (29th)	Khayyam	Umrao Jaan	Hindi	
1982 (30th)	Ramesh Naidu	Meghasandesam	Telugu	
1983 (31st)	Ilaiyaraaja	Saagara Sangamam	Telugu	
1984 (32nd)	Jaidev	Ankahee	Hindi	
1985 (33rd)	Ilaiyaraaja	Sindhu Bhairavi	Tamil	
1986 (34th)	M. Balamuralikrishna	Madhvacharya	Kannada	
1987 (35th)	Vanraj Bhatia	Tamas	Hindi	
1988 (36th)	Ilaiyaraaja	Rudra Veena	Telugu	
1989 (37th)	Sher Choudhury	Wosobipo	Karbi	
1990 (38th)	Hridaynath Mangeshkar	Lekin...	Hindi	
1991 (39th)	Rajat Dholakia	Dharavi	Hindi	
1992 (40th)	A. R. Rahman	Roja	Tamil	
1993 (41st)	Johnson	Ponthan Mada	Malayalam	
1994 (42nd)	Ravi (As Bombay Ravi)	• Sukrutham • Parinayam	Malayalam	
1994 (42nd)	Johnson	Sukrutham	Malayalam	
1995 (43rd)	Hamsalekha	Sangeetha Sagara Ganayogi Panchakshara Gavai	Kannada	
1996 (44th)	A. R. Rahman	Minsara Kanavu	Tamil	
1997 (45th)	M. M. Keeravani	Annamayya	Telugu	
1998 (46th)	Vishal Bhardwaj	Godmother	Hindi	
1999 (47th)	Ismail Darbar	Hum Dil De Chuke Sanam	Hindi	
2000 (48th)	Anu Malik	Refugee	Hindi	
2001 (49th)	A. R. Rahman	Lagaan	Hindi	
2002 (50th)	A. R. Rahman	Kannathil Muthamittal	Tamil	
2003 (51st)	Shankar–Ehsaan–Loy	Kal Ho Naa Ho	Hindi	
2004 (52nd)	Vidyasagar	Swarabhishekam	Telugu	
2005 (53rd)	Lalgudi Jayaraman	Sringaram	Tamil	
2006 (54th)	Ashok Patki	Antarnad	Konkani	
2007 (55th)	Ouseppachan	Ore Kadal	Malayalam	
2008 (56th)	Ajay–Atul	Jogwa	Marathi	
2009 (57th)	Amit Trivedi	Dev.D	Hindi	
2009 (57th)	Ilaiyaraaja	Pazhassi Raja	Malayalam	
2010 (58th)	Vishal Bhardwaj	Ishqiya	Hindi	
2010 (58th)	Isaac Thomas Kottukapally	Adaminte Makan Abu	Malayalam	
2011 (59th)	Neel Dutt	Ranjana Ami Ar Ashbona	Bengali	
2011 (59th)	Mayookh Bhaumik	Laptop	Bengali	
2012 (60th)	Shailendra Barve	Samhita	Marathi	
2012 (60th)	Bijibal	Kaliyachan	Malayalam	
2013 (61st)	Kabir Suman	Jaatishwar	Bengali	
2013 (61st)	Shantanu Moitra	Naa Bangaaru Talli	Telugu	
2014 (62nd)	Vishal Bhardwaj	Haider	Hindi	
2014 (62nd)	Gopi Sundar	1983	Malayalam	
2015 (63rd)	M. Jayachandran	Ennu Ninte Moideen	Malayalam	
2015 (63rd)	Ilaiyaraaja	Tharai Thappattai	Tamil	
2016 (64th)	Bapu Padmanabha	Allama	Kannada	
2017 (65th)	A. R. Rahman	Kaatru Veliyidai	Tamil	
2017 (65th)	A. R. Rahman	Mom	Hindi	
2018 (66th)	Sanjay Leela Bhansali	Padmaavat	Hindi	
2018 (66th)	Shashwat Sachdev	Uri: The Surgical Strike	Hindi	
2019 (67th)	D. Imman	Viswasam	Tamil	
2019 (67th)	Prabuddha Banerjee	Jyeshthoputro	Bengali	
2020 (68th)	Thaman S	Ala Vaikunthapurramuloo	Telugu	
2020 (68th)	G. V. Prakash Kumar	Soorarai Pottru	Tamil	
2021 (69th)	Devi Sri Prasad	Pushpa: The Rise	Telugu	
2021 (69th)	M. M. Keeravani	RRR	Telugu	
2022 (70th)	Pritam	Brahmāstra: Part One – Shiva	Hindi	
2022 (70th)	A. R. Rahman	Ponniyin Selvan: I	Tamil	
2023 (71st)	G. V. Prakash Kumar	Vaathi	Tamil	
2023 (71st)	Harshavardhan Rameshwar	Animal	Hindi	
2024 (72nd)	Shashwat Sachdev	Article 370	Hindi	
2024 (72nd)	G. V. Prakash Kumar	Amaran	Tamil	
