= Jyeshthoputro =

- Directed by: Kaushik Ganguly
- Starring: See below
- Cinematography: Sirsha Ray
- Edited by: Subhajit Singha
- Music by: Prabuddha Banerjee
- Production companies: Surinder Films Pvt. Ltd. Nideas Creations & Productions Pvt. Ltd.
- Release date: 26 April 2019 (India)
- Running time: 125 minutes
- Country: India
- Language: Bengali

Jyeshthoputro (Elder son) is a 2019 Indian Bengali-language drama film directed by Kaushik Ganguly and features Prosenjit Chatterjee, Ritwick Chakraborty, Sudipta Chakraborty and Gargi Roychowdhury. The original story of the film was conceived by Rituparno Ghosh titled Anyo Nayok. In this film Prosenjit and Ritwik shared the screen for the first time. At the 67th National Film award, Jyesthoputro received two awards, one for Best Original Screenplay and another for Best Background Score.

== Plot ==
Indrajit, a superstar Tollywood actor, comes to his native home in Ballabhpur village on hearing the news of his father's death. His family consists of his younger brother Partho, his mentally disbalanced sister Ila and Partho's pregnant wife Rai. However, wherever Indrajit goes, be it the burning ghats or his native home or his friend's house or his guest house, he is always accompanied by his assistants, bodyguards, policemen and above all, hundreds of his fans. Even a mourning ceremony at his native school turns out to be a fiasco as all the villagers flock the place not to mourn for the deceased soul but to have autographs and selfies with the hero. Partho gets disappointed with this. On one hand, he is jealous of his brother's success and popularity as he himself had always been a better actor than him. On the other hand, he feels that why a man who cannot even remember when he last visited his native village should preside over everything just because he is the elder son (jyesthoputro). He feels that as he has alone taken care of his family for so many years, he should alone perform his father's last rites. On one night, in a drunken state, Partho reveals to Indrajit his inner feelings and says that he is the real jyesthoputro as he could serve his father in his old age which Indrajit did not do. Indrajit realizes the inevitable truth in Partho's words and leaves at early dawn.

== Cast ==
- Prosenjit Chatterjee as Indrajit
- Ritwick Chakraborty as Partho
- Gargi Roychowdhury as Sudeshna
- Sudipta Chakraborty as Ila
- Daminee Benny Basu as Parul
- Shreya Bhattacharya as Rai
- Pradeep Bhattacharya as Makai

== Soundtrack ==
Track listing
No.	Title	Singer(s)	Length
1.	"Amar Praner Pore"	Jayati Chakraborty	1:51

== Marketing ==
The official trailer of the film was released on 10 April 2019 by Surinder Films.

== Release and reception ==
The film released on 26 April 2019. The Times of India rated the film 3.5 out of 5 stars. Cinetssan rated the film 3 stars out of five and wrote: "More than the storyline itself, the conflicting characters of Jyeshthoputro appeal to the audience."

== Accolades ==
Year	Ceremony	Category	Recipient	Result
2021	67th National Film Awards	Best Original Screenplay	Kaushik Ganguly	Won
2021	67th National Film Awards	Best Background Score	Prabuddha Banerjee	Won
