= Nagarkirtan (film) =

2019 Indian Bengali film

- Film poster
- Directed by: Kaushik Ganguly
- Written by: Kaushik Ganguly
- Produced by: Sani Ghose Ray
- Starring: Riddhi Sen; Ritwick Chakraborty
- Cinematography: Sirsha Ray
- Edited by: Subhajit Singha
- Music by: Prabuddha Banerjee
- Production company: Acropoliis Entertainment
- Release date: 15 February 2019
- Running time: 115 minutes
- Country: India
- Language: Bengali

Nagarkirtan is a 2019 Indian Bengali-language film written and directed by Kaushik Ganguly and produced by Sani Ghose Ray. The film stars Riddhi Sen as Parimal, a trans woman from rural Bengal, and Ritwick Chakraborty as Madhu, a flute player from the Kirtaniya town of Nabadwip.

At the 65th National Film Awards the film won four Awards including, Special Jury Award (Feature Film) and National Film Award for Best Actor for Riddhi Sen.

== Plot ==
The movie starts with Puti, born Parimal an intersex woman from the ghetto of eunuchs eloping with Madhu da, a delivery boy of a Chinese restaurant who moonlights as a flautist in kirtans. The flashbacks give us an insight of Puti's childhood where her father is strictly against her dressing. She grows up to have a relationship with her private tutor Subhash da who knows of her gender orientation. Puti proposes eloping to America with him in hopes of living freely without hiding. Puti later finds out Subhash da is set to be marrying her elder sister and unable to cope with the trauma, she runs away from home to the ghetto of eunuchs in Kolkata where she becomes a disciple of their Guru ma Arati.

During her time with the eunuchs she meets Madhu da, a delivery boy of a Chinese restaurant and they start meeting in secret and develop a relationship. Puti struggles with her gender dysphoria and wants to alter her body with a sex reassignment surgery. Puti elopes from her community; as leaving the ghetto premises without informing their Guru ma is prohibited and goes to Krishnanagar with Madhu da to meet Manabi Bandyopadhyay who is a well known openly transgender woman. Puti is crestfallen after knowing the cost of a sex reassignment surgery as she can never afford it when Madhu da says he is a landowner in his ancestral home in Nabadwip and is willing to sell the land to gather the cost of Puti's surgery. Puti meets Madhu da's family of Vaishnavs and goes to attend a kirtan where Madhu da plays the flute. Remembering past events with her ex lover combined with the emotions of the kirtan she breaks down and loses her wig in the process, exposing her real short hair to the full court. She runs away and Madhu da follows her but loses her and calls her phone only for his sister-in-law to pick up and be hit by reality. Madhu da's whole family, except for his sister in law who pleads him to call her, disowns him and he wanders the streets of Nabadwip looking for Puti.

Meanwhile, Puti, devoid of all her belongings and money begs for a few rupees from the locals of Nabadwip to eat at a roadside stall. The local eunuchs of Nabadwip outraged by this, knowing of the reputation of phonies dressing up as eunuchs to rip off people, all catch Puti where she is stripped and mobbed in the streets.

Madhu da, troubled by Puti's absence still looks for Puti and asks every passerby if they have seen her until he stumbles upon a man who claims to have seen her and shows him a video of Puti being stripped and beaten by the eunuchs. Madhu da breaks down in tears and goes to the police station where he tells the inspector she is his "girlfriend". They find out Puti has committed suicide by hanging herself with her towel inside the lockup where Madhu da holds her hanging feet and grieves and eventually joins the same ghetto of eunuchs in Kolkata.

== Cast ==
- Riddhi Sen as Parimal / Puti
- Ritwick Chakraborty as Madhu
- Manabi Bandyopadhyay as herself

== Scope ==
The film is a document that frames this experience of an invisible community, rarely portrayed in Indian mainstream cinema. The fabric of Ganguly's film moves beyond the binaries of a linear and complex narrative and instead brings forth a breathtaking ruthlessness that mirrors the hidden lives and traumas of the Transgender/ Hijra/ Intersex/ gender non-conforming communities. The film embodies the visceral experience of these communities battling centuries of prejudice and taboo. The community's lived realities of being caught between questions of vice and virtue, desire and rejection sustains the film's body narrative – rather precariously – avoiding a moral position – yet examining the very contours that makes taking these positions complicated. In a society that largely considers trans bodies as dustbins to dump its traumas and miscarriages of justice, the film signals a language of change that can be used to build a narrative of resistance.

== Controversy ==
In February 2019, Bengali writer Swapnamoy Chakraborty alleged that this film was plagiarised from his Ananda Puraskar winning novel titled Holde Golap but later, he revised his views on the film and declared that Nagarkirtan is not a cinematic adaptation of Holde Golap.

== Awards ==
- 2017: National Film Awards
  - Special Jury Award (Feature Film): Nagarkirtan - Acropoliis Entertainment (Producer), Kaushik Ganguly (Director)
  - Best Actor: Riddhi Sen
  - Best Costume Design: Gobinda Mandal
  - Best Make-up Artist: Ram Rajak

2019: won the Best Feature Film award at the 9th edition of SAARC film festival 2019 in Colombo.
