= Aajo Ardhangini =

2026 Indian Bengali film

- Theatrical release poster
- Directed by: Kaushik Ganguly
- Screenplay by: Kaushik Ganguly
- Story by: Kaushik Ganguly
- Produced by: Surinder Singh; Nispal Singh
- Starring: Churni Ganguly; Jaya Ahsan; Kaushik Sen
- Cinematography: Gopi Bhagat
- Edited by: Subhajit Singha
- Music by: Anupam Roy
- Production company: Surinder Films
- Distributed by: Surinder Films
- Release date: 10 July 2026
- Running time: 145 minutes
- Country: India
- Language: Bengali

Aajo Ardhangini (transl. Better Half Even Today) is a 2026 Indian Bengali drama film written and directed by Kaushik Ganguly. The film has been produced by Surinder Singh and Nispal Singh under the banner of Surinder Films. A direct sequel to the Ardhangini (2023), the film stars Churni Ganguly, Jaya Ahsan and Kaushik Sen in the lead, reprising their roles from the prequel. Indrasish Roy and Ambarish Bhattacharya play other pivotal roles.

It explores the complex relationship between Suman, his former wife Shubhra and his present wife Meghna, after circumstances bring them together. Anupam Roy and Amit Chatterjee were roped in as the music director and background score composer, respectively. Gopi Bhagat did the cinematography while Subhajit Singha handled the editing. The film was released in the theatres on 10 July 2026, to mixed reviews from the critics and positive reviews from the audience.

== Synopsis ==
Set after the events of Ardhangini (2023), the story follows Meghna and Suman as their marriage is shaken when Meghna appears to be pregnant. Aware of his own inability to become a father, Suman becomes convinced that Meghna has been unfaithful with her former lover Ranjan. His accusations lead to a heated argument, prompting Meghna to leave their home and live separately.

When Meghna faces an unexpected health crisis, she turns to Subhra, Suman's former wife, for support and guidance. Their renewed interaction restores unresolved questions from the past, including the truth surrounding Meghna's pregnancy and the circumstances that have shaped her relationship with Suman. As the story progresses, long-buried secrets are revealed, bringing significant changes to the lives of Meghna, Subhra, and Suman.

== Cast ==
- Kaushik Sen as Suman Chatterjee
- Jaya Ahsan as Meghna Mustafizur, Suman's current wife
- Churni Ganguly as Shubhra Mitra, Suman's ex-wife
- Indrasish Roy as Ranjan Laha, an advocate and Meghna's former lover
- Ambarish Bhattacharya as Sukanta "Chhoto" Chatterjee, Suman's brother
- Lily Chakravarty as Parul Chatterjee, Suman and Sukanta's mother
- Avery Singha Roy
- Raya Bhattcharya
- Dimple Acharya
- Rajvi Saha

== Production ==
Director Kaushik Ganguly said in an interview that he decided to create a sequel for Ardhangini (2023), owing to the success of the first part coupled with the audience demand for a sequel. Aajo Ardhangini was announced on 28 May 2025. Churni Ganguly, Jaya Ahsan and Kaushik Sen reprised their roles from the prequel. Indrasish Roy was cast in a pivotal role.

The look test results of Churni Ganguly, Jaya Ahsan and Kaushik Sen were revealed on 2 June 2025. Principal photography began on 14 June 2025. The filming was completed on 2 July 2025.

== Soundtrack ==
Aajo Ardhangini

Soundtrack album by Anupam Roy
- Released: 2026
- Genre: Film soundtrack
- Length: 20:41
- Language: Bengali
- Labels: Surinder Films; Surinder Music

The soundtrack of the film has been composed by Anupam Roy. The lyrics have been penned by Roy himself. The background score has been composed by Amit Chatterjee.

The first single "Tumi Mone Hoy Chole Jabe" was released on 19 June 2026. The second single "Shorir Bhalo Nei" was dropped on 29 June 2026. The third single "Koto Dure Dure" was released on 4 July 2026. The fourth single "Tumi Mone Hoy Chole Jabe (Male)" was revealed on 9 July 2026. The fifth and last single "Aajo Klanto Pathochari" was released on 18 July 2026.

Track listing
No.	Title	Singer(s)	Length
1.	"Tumi Mone Hoy Chole Jabe"	Rapurna Bhattacharya	4:49
2.	"Shorir Bhalo Nei"	Lagnajita Chakraborty	3:41
3.	"Koto Dure Dure"	Iman Chakraborty	4:17
4.	"Tumi Mone Hoy Chole Jabe (Male)"	Anupam Roy	4:44
5.	"Aajo Klanto Pathochari"	Iman Chakraborty	3:10
Total length:			20:41

== Marketing ==
The theatrical release poster of the film was released on 12 June 2026. A still from the film, featuring Ambarish Bhattacharya's wedding scene, was shared on 19 June 2026.

The trailer of Aajo Ardhangini was released on 26 June 2016. As a part of the promotions, Kaushik Ganguly, Churni Ganguly and Jaya Ahsan inaugurated the annual Ilish Utsav at Sonargaon in Taj Bengal, Kolkata.

== Release ==
The film was released in the theatres on 10 July 2026. It was premiered on the same day, at Cinépolis in Acropolis Mall, Kolkata.

== Reception ==
=== Box-office ===
The film grossed over ₹1 crore after 5 days.

=== Critical reception ===
Agnivo Niyogi of The Telegraph reviewed the film and opined "While the film aims for emotional closure, it lacks the lingering impact that made the ending of Ardhangini so memorable. Not every line lands with equal impact, but the writing remains thoughtful throughout." He applauded the themes, strong dialogues, performance of the whole cast and the writing of the characters but criticized the repetitive storytelling, reiterating conversations and the lack of dramatic tension throughout the film.

Raima Ganguly of The Times of India rated the film 3.5/5 stars and wrote "The film deliberately withholds its emotional destination, allowing several possibilities to emerge before arriving at an ending that feels both earned and deeply satisfying". She praised the performance of the lead cast, Ganguly's writing for each of the characters, proper handling of the complex nature of human relationships, the conclusion and the music but bemoaned the excessive number of songs and weak screenplay.

Subhankar Chakraborty of The Wall reviewed the film and highlighted "Aajo Aardhangini is a film that continues to resonate with the audience even after it ends. Some relationships break, some relationships change, some relationships never return to their previous state. Maybe that's why the film remains unfinished even after it ends." He appreciated the performance of the cast, Shubhra and Suman's early morning long conversation sequence, the chemistry between Meghna and Shubhra, the screenplay, the dialogues and the climax.

Sharmistha Ghosal of Indulge Express reviewed the film and wrote "A masterful sequel driven by a powerhouse performance from Churni Ganguly, this relationship drama avoids the usual tropes to deliver a true theatrical gem." She praised Churni Ganguly's performance, Koushik and Jaya in their respective roles, the songs, the direction and the storyline. Ranjan Bandyopadhyay of Sangbad Pratidin reviewed the film and noted "Aajo Aardhangini once again reminded us that people have to bow down to the invincible Nemesis." He praised the performances, direction and the music of the film.
