= Yoddha: The Warrior =

2014 Indian Bengali film by Raj Chakraborty

- Yoddha : The Warrior Movie Poster
- Directed by: Raj Chakraborty
- Written by: Abhimanyu Mukherjee
- Based on: Magadheera
- Produced by: Shree Venkatesh Films Pvt Ltd
- Starring: Dev; Mimi Chakraborty; Nigel Akkara; Rajatava Dutta
- Cinematography: Subhankar Bhar
- Edited by: Rabi Ranjan Maitra
- Music by: Indraadip Dasgupta, Savvy
- Release date: 1 October 2014
- Running time: 150:34 minutes
- Country: India
- Language: Bengali

Yoddha: The Warrior is a 2014 Indian Bengali-language fantasy romantic action film directed by Raj Chakraborty. It is a remake of 2009 Telugu film Magadheera. It marks the return of Dev and Raj Chakraborty as an actor-director duo after Dui Prithibi. It was produced by Shree Venkatesh Films and was released on 1 October 2014, during the Durga Puja. It received mostly negative reviews from critics and became a box office failure.

== Cast ==
- Dev in a dual role as
  - Rudra Pratap
  - Abir
- Mimi Chakraborty in a dual role as
  - Rajkumari Durga
  - Nandini
- Nigel Akkara in a dual role as
  - Ranabir
  - Raghav Chaudhry
- Rajatava Dutta in a dual role as
  - Abu Hossain
  - Ali Bhai
- Kanchan Mullick as Abir's friend
- Supriyo Dutta as Shonku
- Rajesh kr Chattopadhyay
- Nusrat Jahan as special dancer in "Desi Chhori" Song
- Barun Chanda as the king of Sundargarh
- Mrinal Mukherjee as Ramlatan Choudhury, father of Raghav
- Shantilal Mukherjee
- Pradip Dhar
- Prasun Gain
- Hektor Sandhu

== Soundtrack ==
Yoddha

Soundtrack album by Savvy
- Released: September 2014
- Recorded: 2014
- Genre: Soundtrack
- Language: Bengali
- Label: SVF
- Producers: Shrikanto Mohta; Jalsha Movies Production

Savvy chronology
Bindaas (2014)	Yoddha (2014)	Romeo vs Juliet (2015)

Indraadip Dasgupta chronology
Golpo Holeo Shotti (2014) (2014)	Yoddha: The Warrior (2014)	Khaad (2014)

The soundtrack of the film was scored by Indraadip Dasgupta and Savvy.

Track	Song	Singer(s)	Duration (min:sec)	Music	Lyricist
1	"Desi Chhori"	Satrujit Dasgupta and Neha Kakkar	3:48	Savvy	Riddhi Barua
2	"Sharatadin"	Arijit Singh and Anweshaa Dutta Gupta	5:13	Indraadip Dasgupta	Srijato
3	"Aami Tomar Kache"	Arijit Singh	3:50	Indraadip Dasgupta	Prasen (Prasenjit Mukherjee)
4	"Yoddhar Saathe Ebar Pujo Katan"	Nakash Aziz	3:49	Savvy	Riddhi Barua
5	"Ebar Jeno Onno Rokom Pujo"	Nakash Aziz and Antara Mitra	3:38	Indraadip Dasgupta	Prasen (Prasenjit Mukherjee)

== Release and reception ==
It was released on 1 October, during the time of Durga Puja. It received mostly negative reviews and was considered a disaster.

== World television premiere ==
The film had its world television premiere on Star Jalsha on 25 January 2015 on 6:00 pm I.S.T.
