= Shankar Mudi =

2019 Indian Bengali film

- Film poster
- Directed by: Aniket Chattopadhyay
- Produced by: Kaustav Ray
- Starring: Kaushik Ganguly
- Cinematography: Sirsha Ray
- Edited by: Sanjib Dutta
- Music by: Kabir Sumon
- Release date: 15 March 2019
- Running time: 135 minutes
- Country: India
- Language: Bengali

Shankar Mudi is a Bengali Political drama film directed by Aniket Chattopadhyay and produced by Kaustuv Ray. It was released on 15 March 2019 under the banner of RP Techvision India Private Limited. The Bengali actor-director Shri Kaushik Ganguly plays the title role.

== Plot ==
This is a story of a small suburban locality of the Metro City Kolkata named Goragacha. The neighbourhood or in Bengali Para consists of a small grocery shop, run by its owner Shankar, a barber, a tea stall, a ladies' tailor, a gents' tailor and a local auto rickshaw driver. Amongst locals, there are a political leader or dada, a family whose only young youth was actively engaged in politics and subsequently died in a police encounter, a teacher, a live-in frustrated son-in-law and a Bahurupi. The story started with affectionate bondage between people in that big joint family like para, which slowly faced the fear of becoming extinct due to their financial stringency. As a part of advanced civilized modernisation which was an obvious effect of globalisation, a shopping mall emerged in their locality. Local residents are slowly accustomed to the central air conditioned comfort, wide range of products, promotional techniques, acceptance of digital payments etc. of the local shopping mall which puts a strong and uneven challenge to the survival of local small scale business owners who were losing their livelihood very fast. Shankar tried to cope-up with "mall effects" like keeping packet food grains, home delivery, introducing utility bill payments, even installing stand blower fan for his customers who in his version are his God. But all his and the entire neighbourhood's struggle gone in vain. Some leave, someone compromised their chastity, someone committed suicide after being defeated in this life struggle for survival. The plot clearly pinpoints the obvious negative impact of globalization without having constructive governmental planning for saving medium or small-scale businesses.

== Cast ==
- Kaushik Ganguly as Shankar Mudi
- Jisshu Sengupta as Live-in Son-in-Law
- Anjan Dutta as School Teacher
- Shantilal Mukherjee as Local Political Leader
- Saswata Chatterjee as Auto Rikshaw Driver
- Rudranil Ghosh as Bahurupi
- Kanchan Mullick as Barbar
- Sreela Majumdar as Wife of Shankar Mudi
- Biswanath Basu as Gents' Tailor Owner
- Sampurna Lahiri
- Oindrila Saha
- Ankita Chakraborty as Ladies' Tailor owner
- Malay Ghosh as Building Contractor of the Mall
