= Mrs. Sen =

- Theatrical release poster
- Directed by: Agnidev Chatterjee
- Screenplay by: Sudipa Mukherjee
- Story by: Agnidev Chatterjee
- Produced by: Pankaj Agarwal
- Starring: See below
- Cinematography: Sirsha Ray
- Edited by: Santanu Mukherjee
- Music by: Indraadip Dasgupta
- Release date: 7 June 2013 (Kolkata)
- Country: India
- Language: Bengali

Mrs. Sen is a 2013 Bengali film directed by Agnidev Chatterjee and produced by Pankaj Agarwal. It features actors Rituparna Sengupta and Rohit Roy in the lead roles. Indradeep Dasgupta composed the music for the film. The film was released on 6 June 2013.

== Plot ==
The film begins with the scenic beauty of the Himalayas, and in the backdrop Anuradha (Rituparna Sengupta) was reading out letters to her never-to-be-born child. Then, a sudden telephone ring breaks the silence of an early December morning. Anuradha received the call and is stupefied upon hearing the voice from the other side of the telephone, which stated that her husband, Somnath (Rohit Roy) had been the victim of a deadly accident in Thailand and was currently in coma stage. Anuradha realised that she has to catch the very next flight as soon as possible and get to her husband, who was admitted to a hospital.

Anuradha and Somnath were married for seven years, and were leading a happy life without any problems. Anuradha, who was desiring to be a mother, was told by her husband that due to some problems, he could not impregnate her. Somnath was able to settle disputes with Anuradha after a long try. Anuradha, who passed from a Bengali Medium school, had never been abroad. She had just received a passport to go to Dubai with her husband, the next January.

As Anuradha reaches Thailand, she comes across the fact that her husband has a wife and a child there. In fact, Somnath's other wife, Sohini (Hrishita Bhatt), was also in the car during the accident. But even before she can think and determine anything, she was given the task of looking after Somnath's 8-year-old boy and Sohini's brother (Subhasish Mukhopadhyay). Anuradha is perplexed as she couldn't decide whether to love or hate the innocent child. Later, when Sohini becomes conscious again, she too comes across the fact behind Anuradha's existence. She didn't want to believe the fact at once, but later, she faces the truth. On the other hand, Anuradha gets into a dilemma about whom to hate- her husband, for cheating her, or Sohini. Sohini is soon released from the hospital, though she was not totally recovered. A peculiar situation prevailed over the Sen family, where Sohini and Anuradha tried their best to make their place in the family. After a few days, the news of Somnath's death in the hospital reaches the two women. The events which occur next after the only connection between the two women was gone, form the climax of the story.

== Cast ==
- Rituparna Sengupta as Anuradha
- Rohit Roy as Somnath
- Hrishita Bhatt as Sohini
- Priyangshu Chowdhury as Rishabh
- Shankar Chakraborty as Anuradha's brother
- Biplab Chatterjee as Somnath's father
- Anusuya Majumdar as Somnath's mother
- Subhasish Mukhopadhyay as Sohini's brother
- Rupsa Guha as Indian Embassy Employee
- Pulokita Ghosh as Indian Embassy Employee
- Ushasie Chakraborty in a cameo appearance

== Soundtrack ==
Mrs. Sen

Soundtrack album by Indraadip Dasgupta
- Released: 2013
- Genre: Feature film soundtrack
- Length: 59:07

Indraadip Dasgupta chronology
| Mistake (2013) | Mrs. Sen (2013) | Proloy (2013) |

Soundtrack of Mrs. Sen has been composed by Indraadip Dasgupta. Lyrics are penned by Indraadip Dasgupta and Srijato. The track-list includes three Rabindra Sangeets.

=== Track listing ===
| No. | Title | Lyrics | Music | Singer(s) | Length |
|---|---|---|---|---|---|
| 1. | "Chupi Chupi (Version 1)" | Indraadip Dasgupta | Indraadip Dasgupta | Arijit Singh | 6:26 |
| 2. | "Chupi Chupi (Version 2)" | Indraadip Dasgupta | Indraadip Dasgupta | Rupankar Bagchi | 6:52 |
| 3. | "Chupi Chupi (Version 3)" | Indraadip Dasgupta | Indraadip Dasgupta | Subhamita Banerjee | 6:06 |
| 4. | "Ghar Aaja (Part 1)" | Srijato | Indraadip Dasgupta | Arijit Singh | 7:56 |
| 5. | "Amar Khela Jakhon Chilo" | Rabindranath Tagore | Rabindranath Tagore | Srabani Sen | 6:04 |
| 6. | "Tumi Chere Chiley (Female Version)" | Rabindranath Tagore | Rabindranath Tagore | Jayati Chakraborty | 5:57 |
| 7. | "Tobu Mone Rekho" | Rabindranath Tagore | Rabindranath Tagore | Srabani Sen | 5:52 |
| 8. | "Tumi Chere Chiley (Male Version)" | Rabindranath Tagore | Rabindranath Tagore | Partho Banerjee | 5:58 |
| 9. | "Ghar Aaja (Part 2)" | Srijato | Indraadip Dasgupta | Arijit Singh | 7:56 |
| Total length: | | | | | 59:07 |

== See also ==
- Aparajita Tumi
- Biwi No.1
