= Sunil Ganguly (musician) =

Indian musician (1938–1999)

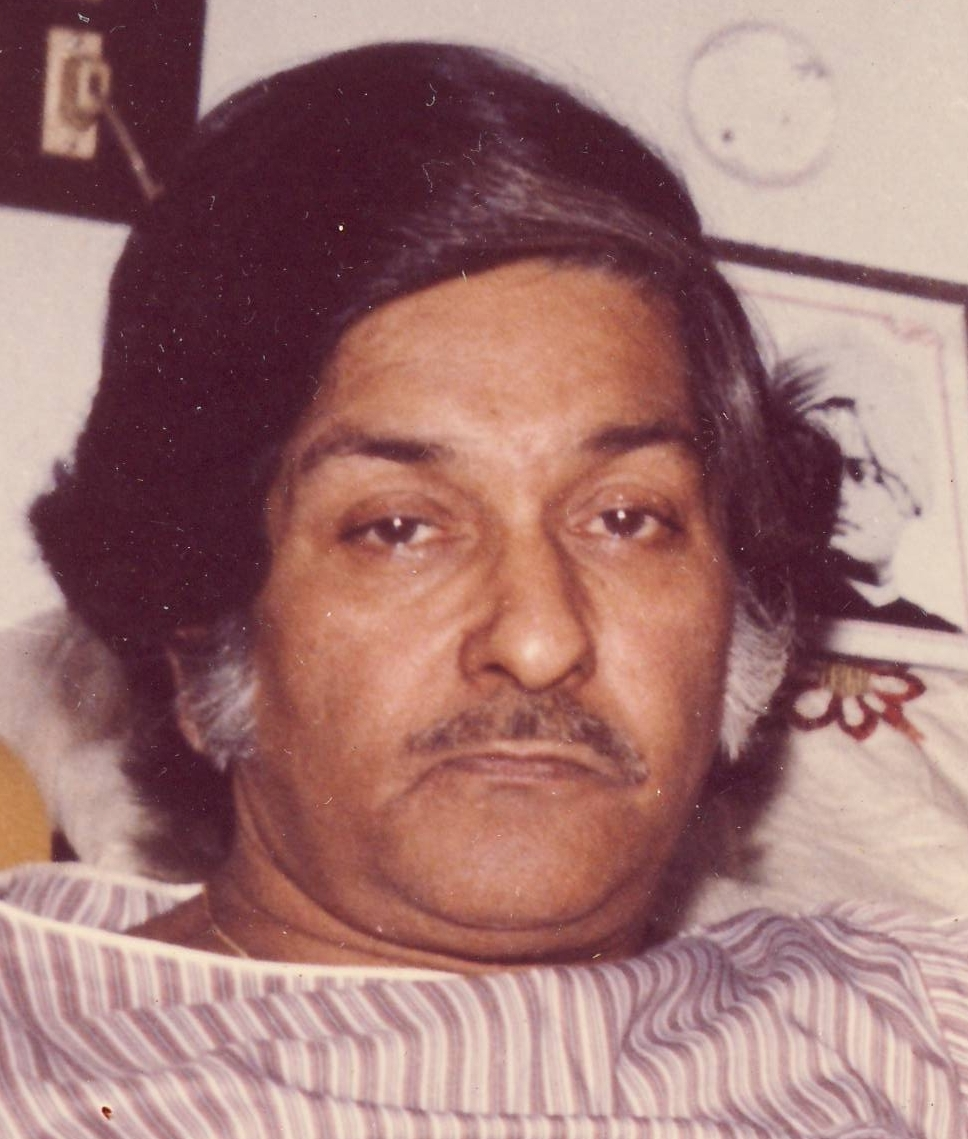
- Sunil Ganguly
- Born: 1 January 1938; Sonamura, Tripura State, British India
- Died: 12 June 1999 (aged 61); Calcutta, West Bengal, India
- Occupation: Steel Guitarist
- Known for: Indian Instrumental Music
- Children: Kaushik Ganguly
- Relatives: Churni Ganguly (daughter-in-law); Ujaan Ganguly (grandson)
- Awards: Asian Paints Shiromani award for contribution to music

Sunil Ganguly (Bengali: সুনীল গাঙ্গুলি; 1 January 1938 – 12 June 1999) was an Indian instrumentalist from Kolkata. He popularized the Hawaiian electric guitar in India. He made several albums with His Master's Voice (now Saregama), Concorde Records, and Sagarika, with instrumental renditions of Hindi film music, classical songs, Bengali film songs, modern songs, Nazrul Geeti, Rabindra Sangeet, and ghazals by composers like Mehdi Hassan, Ghulam Ali, Jagjit Singh, and Bade Ghulam Ali,.

Ganguly gave many public performances all over India, including in Kolkata, Mumbai, Delhi, Lucknow, Patna, Guwahati, and Agartala. He did one-man all-night shows in Mumbai and played in college festivals at the Indian Institutes of Technology and National Institutes of Technology. Musicians such as Y. S. Mulki, Dilip Roy, Samir Khasnabis, Swapan Sen, and Manohari Singh have accompanied him in recordings and performances. Ganguly was a regular performer on Doordarshan programs in Kolkata and Mumbai, as well as on All India Radio and Radio Ceylon.

== Early life and career ==
Ganguly was born in Sonamura, Tripura on 1 January 1938. He moved with his parents to Kolkata as a child.

He won the All India Youth Guitar competition, and Ustad Bade Ghulam Ali Khan then recommended Ganguly to All India Radio in a letter.

He trained in Western music under Oscar Jones, a teacher in Kolkata.

He later trained under the sitarist Ajoy Sinha Roy, who was a student of Baba Alauddin Khan. Ganguly had a profound knowledge of North Indian classical music. He developed a style of playing classical raga-based dhuns and gats on the Hawaiian guitar. He started the "gayaki" style of playing which was nonexistent at the time, and this led to the huge popularity of the instrumentals he rendered on the Hawaiian guitar, including film songs, ghazals, Tagore songs, Nazrul songs, and other popular songs. He played a wide variety of songs in his career, including Hindi film songs, songs of Lata Mangeshkar, ghazals, by Jagjit Singh, Mehdi Hassan, and Ghulam Ali, Bengali film songs, Tagore songs, Nazrul Geeti, Bengali songs by Satinath Mukhopadhyay, Shyamal Mitra, and Hemanta Mukherjee, and Bihu songs in the Assamese language.

His recording career spanned more than 40 years from 1957, when he made his first album with His Master's Voice. The Bengali singer and composer Satinath Mukhopadhyay played a major role in introducing Sunil Ganguly to His Master's Voice. Ganguly's records include 'Ghazal chedi usne' - an album of instrumentals of ghazals by prominent singers such as Mehdi Hassan, Jagjit Singh, and Ghulam Ali; 'Ibteda' - an album of compositions by Jagjit Singh; 'The Classic Touch'; 'Sentimental Journey'; 'The Golden Collection - All Time Greats, Vol I and II'; 'Swinging hits'; 'More hits'; 'Magic Melody'; 'Instrumental Film Hits'; 'Sunil Ganguly'; 'The Singing Guitar' - with Kazi Aniruddha; 'Encore - Electric Guitar'; 'Renaissance' - song of Kazi Nazrul Islam on the guitar; 'Khelicho E Biswa Loye' - Nazrul Geeti; 'Surer Jharna' - instrumentals of Bengali hits; and 'Tribute to Hemanta Mukherjee'.

Towards the later part of his career, Sunil Ganguly made a few albums from Concorde records and Sagarika Co. (For ex: 'Ei Sundor Swarnali Sondhay - Bengali hits like 'Jibon Khatar prati patay', 'Bhora thak Smritisudhay -Tagore songs' from Sagarika, 'Instrumental Film Hits - containing hits from Betaab, Agar Tum na Hote' from Concord. His Master's Voice and other Cos, released some of his best instrumentals in the form of CD, for ex: 'Nostalgia : Ghazal Chedi Usne, Great Ghazals on guitar', 'Nostalgia : Melodies to caress your Heart 'N' Soul', 'Tumi Rabe Nirobe', 'Instrumentally Yours - Tribute to Manna Dey', 'The Best of Bollywood Instrumentals Ever' from His Master's Voice (now Saregama Ltd), 'Yaadein' (containing hits of Kishore Kumar and Md. Rafi), 'Golden greats from Yesteryears' from Sagarika.

== Personal life ==
Ganguly's son, Kaushik Ganguly, became a prominent film director.

Ganguly gave music classes at his residence in Garia. He also gave music classes at several institutions in Kolkata like BaniChakra (South Kolkata) and Technique Studio (North Kolkata). Students came from far away places like Asansol, Durgapur, Odisha, and Tripura to his classes.

He was a follower of Swami Vivekananda. Ganguly had many disciples, many of whom took up the guitar as a profession. Sunil Ganguly Academy of Music, created at his residence, is run by Sri Aloke Ghosh, one of his disciples. Many of his students, like Sonali Nath, Geeta Deb, Shyamal Chowdhury, and Amarnath Banik in Agartala, Tripura are continuing to play and teach his style of music.

Remembering Sunil Ganguly on his birthday 1 January 2018.

== Discography ==
Concord Records

- Instrumental Film Hits LP (1984) 04 0001
- Renaissance (Tunes from Najrulgeeti) LP (1984) 04 0001

Cassettes from His Master's Voice (RPG Enterprises)

- Ibteda Ever melodious compositions of Jagjit Singh on Electric Hawaaian Guitar (1993) SPHOS 23211
- The Golden Collection – All Time Greats – Sunil Ganguly Vols 1 and 2 (1994) STHV 842607 and 842608
- Khelicho e biswha loye – Songs of Nazrul on Electric Guitar (1991) SPHOS 23129
- Tumi Rabe Nirobe – Tunes of Tagore songs on Electric Guitar (1981) SPHOS 842697
- Surer akashe tumi je go suktara (Tribute to Hemanta Mukhopadhyay) (1991) SPHOS 23137
- Surer Jharna – Bengali instrumentals on Electric Guitar (1992) SPHOS 23156

Cassettes from Sagarika Acoustronics

- Ei sundar swarnali sandhyay – Bengali film songs on Guitar (1996) 31071
- Bhara thak smriti sudhai – Tagore songs on electric Guitar (1996) 31072

CDs from His Master's Voice (Saregama Ltd)

- Nostalgia Melodies to caress your Heart 'N' Soul (2001) – CDF 130310
- Nostalgia Melodies to caress your Heart 'N' Soul Ghazal Chhedi Usne, Great Ghazals on Guitar(2001) – CDF 130311

CDs from Sagarika Acoustronics

- Golden Greats of Yesteryears (1996) – C600015
- Yaadein (A tribute to Mohd. Rafi and Kishore Kumar) (1993) – MILS 012

Digital albums

- Melodies Forever -
- Instrumental - Kazi Anirudha and Sunil Ganguly
- Puja 93 - Sunil Ganguly
- Sentimental Journey
- Surer Akashe Tumi Je Go Suktara
- The Classic Touch
- All Time Greats - Sunil Ganguly
- Tumi Rabe Nirabe
- Sunil Ganguly Nazrul Tunes
