= Ajogyo =

2024 Indian Bengali film by Kaushik Ganguly

- Theatrical release poster
- Directed by: Kaushik Ganguly
- Screenplay by: Kaushik Ganguly
- Story by: Kaushik Ganguly
- Produced by: Surinder Singh; Nispal Singh
- Starring: Prosenjit Chatterjee; Rituparna Sengupta; Silajit Majumder; Lily Chakravarty
- Cinematography: Gopi Bhagat
- Edited by: Subhajit Singha
- Music by: Indraadip Dasgupta; Anupam Roy; Ranajoy Bhattacharjee
- Production company: Surinder Films
- Distributed by: Surinder Films
- Release date: 7 June 2024
- Running time: 128 minutes
- Country: India
- Language: Bengali

Ajogyo is a 2024 Indian Bengali-language romantic thriller film written and directed by Kaushik Ganguly. The film stars Prosenjit Chatterjee, Rituparna Sengupta, Silajit Majumder and Lily Chakravarty in the lead roles. Ambarish Bhattacharya and Sudip Mukherjee play other pivotal roles. It is produced by Surinder Singh and Nispal Singh under the banner of Surinder Films.

This film marked the 50th collaboration of the iconic pair of Prosenjit - Rituparna in the lead roles. Indraadip Dasgupta, Anupam Roy and Ranajoy Bhattacharjee did the music of the film. It was released in the theatres on 7 June 2024. The film opened to positive responses from the critics and audiences alike. The film was a commercial success.

== Synopsis ==
Parna's husband Raktim was suddenly fired from his job. In this crisis-ridden state, they received an unexpected guest Prosen Mitra. He is her husband's confidante. The story revolves around whether Prasen will be able to usher in happiness in the breaking down family or will he create further problems.

== Cast ==
- Prosenjit Chatterjee as Prosen Mitra, Parna's ex-lover
- Rituparna Sengupta as Parna, Raktim's wife
- Silajit Majumder as Raktim, Parna's husband
- Lily Chakravarty as Prosen's mother
- Ambarish Bhattacharya as a solo traveller
- Sudip Mukherjee as Parna's boss

== Production ==
=== Announcement and Filming ===
On 28 April 2024, director Surinder Films released an announcement poster of the film. The announcement poster mentioned the fact that it is going to be the 50th film of Prosenjit - Rituparna duo.

=== Marketing ===
The film was promoted and marketed as the 50th film of Prosenjit - Rituparna duo. The official trailer was released on 17 May 2024 on the YouTube channel of Surinder Films. Glimpses of the film were shown on the Biswa Bangla Gate as a part of the promotions. The film was mostly shot in parts of Kolkata and Puri.

== Music ==
Ajogyo

Soundtrack album by Anupam Roy, Indraadip Dasgupta and Ranajoy Bhattacharjee
- Released: 2024
- Recorded: 2023–24
- Genre: Film soundtrack
- Length: 23:42
- Language: Bengali
- Label: Surinder Films

The music of the film has been composed by Anupam Roy, Indraadip Dasgupta and Ranajoy Bhattacharjee. The lyrics were written by Kaushik Ganguly, Anupam Roy and Ranajoy Bhattacharjee.

The first single "Tui Amar Hobi Na" was released on 13 May 2024. It created a controversy on social media regarding the wrong spelling of the word "Hobi". The second single "Ajogyo Ami", which is the title track of the film, was dropped on 22 May 2024. The third song "Keu Janbe Na" was released on 27 May 2024. The fourth single "Ajogyo Ami (Rock Version)" was released on 1 June 2024. The fifth song "Amar Dukkhe Tumi" was released on 6 June 2024. The sixth single, a male version of "Tui Amar Hobi Na" was released on 15 June 2024.

Track listing
No.	Title	Lyrics	Music	Singer(s)	Length
1.	"Tui Amar Hobi Na"	Ranajoy Bhattacharjee	Ranajoy Bhattacharjee	Shreya Ghoshal	3:15
2.	"Ajogyo Ami"	Anupam Roy	Anupam Roy	Anupam Roy	3:09
3.	"Keu Janbe Na"	Kaushik Ganguly	Indraadip Dasgupta	Arijit Singh	3:33
4.	"Ajogyo Ami (Rock Version)"	Anupam Roy	Anupam Roy	Rupam Islam	3:59
5.	"Amar Dukkhe Tumi"	Kaushik Ganguly	Anupam Roy	Iman Chakraborty, Silajit Majumder	4:51
6.	"Tui Amar Hobi Na (Male)"	Ranajoy Bhattacharjee	Ranajoy Bhattacharjee	Rupankar Bagchi	4:59
Total length:					23:42

== Release ==
The film was released theatrically on 7 June 2024.

== Reception ==
=== Box office ===
The film took a blockbuster opening at the box-office. In the first week, the film minted around ₹ 97 lakhs from multiplexes alone. It has collected over ₹1.25 crore in the first two weeks.

=== Critical reception ===
Suparna Majumder of Sangbad Pratidin reviewed the film on a positive note and wrote "Kaushik Ganguly has successfully interwoven the emotions of love, anger, grief with the past and present. All the actors, specially Prosenjit, Rituparna and Silajit have successfully done their roles." Poorna Banerjee of Times of India rated the film 3 out of 5 stars and wrote "The dialogues and script moves at a sluggish pace, making the second half more slow. Despite the music and the beautiful settings, the romance lacks emotional depth."

Sudip Ghosh of Anandabazar Patrika rated the film 7.5 out of 10 stars and wrote "The director has failed to justify the thriller part in the film." He praised the chemistry between Prosenjit-Rituparna, acting of the actors, the story and its twists. Shamayita Chakraborty of OTTplay rated the film 3 out of 5 stars. He specially praised Silajit's acting skills. She wrote "Silajit's tiny touches and simple gestures make the character look real and his subdued acting is a pleasure to watch. Prosenjit - Rituparna shared a charming chemistry." She praised the music, background score and cinematography. But he also criticised the elusiveness of Prasen's character and the umpteen number of times reference to Lord Jagannath.

Souvik Saha of Cine Kolkata rated the film 2.5 out of 5 stars and wrote "The stellar performance of the cast and dialogues are the USP of the film. But the slow second half and predictability of the film makes it a one time watch." Subhasmita Kanji of Hindustan Times rated the film 4.1 out of 5 stars and wrote "The performance of the whole cast, fine storytelling of the director, the music and dialogues - everything was perfect to make it a mind refreshing film."
