= Shabdo =

- Movie poster
- Directed by: Kaushik Ganguly
- Written by: Kaushik Ganguly
- Produced by: Gautam Kundu
- Starring: Ritwik Chakraborty; Raima Sen; Churni Ganguly; Victor Banerjee; Srijit Mukherji
- Cinematography: Sirsha Ray
- Edited by: Mainak Bhaumik
- Production company: Brand Value Communication
- Release dates: 10 December 2012 (Dubai Film Festival); 12 April 2013 (Kolkata)
- Running time: 100 minutes
- Country: India
- Language: Bengali
- Budget: ₹7 million
- Box office: ₹16 million

Shabdo (Note: Spelling according to official website.) (Sound) is a 2012 Bengali film directed by Kaushik Ganguly. The film revolves around the life of Tarak, a Foley artist from a Bengali film. Tarak's job is to create ambient sounds for films, but, he gradually gets trapped in his own world, a world full of sound (i.e. Shabdo). It won the 60th National Film Awards for Best Feature Film in Bengali and the Best Audiography. It went on to KFF 2011, IFFI 2012, Goa, Dubai Film Festival, Singapore Film festival 2012.

== Plot ==
The protagonist of the film is Tarak Dutta, a foley artist. He is so obsessed with his work that he loses his grip on words and his mind starts registering only Foley sounds.

The film starts showing Tarak's distraught wife who has taken him to a psychiatrist for treatment because she feels that he lives in a world of his own. The psychiatrist discovers that actually there is nothing wrong with Tarak's hearing ability. He just concentrates so much on background sounds that he does not pay attention to vocal sounds. While the doctor is speaking to him, Tarak is busy listening to the sounds of traffic in the streets or the sound of the Rubik's cube that she is holding in her hands. The doctor tries to convince Tarak that he has a serious problem and he needs treatment. But Tarak is not ready to believe that he has any problem. On the doctor's advice Tarak's wife take him to Siliguri for a short holiday. Even there Tarak keeps listening to all the natural sounds like the twittering of birds or the gush of water in a mountain spring. On the trip, Tarak tries to convince his wife that there is nothing wrong with him. He just keeps thinking about sounds because that's his job.

Tarak starts rebelling against the doctor and refuse to take treatment. Things come to a head, when the doctor tries to talk to him through headphones at this recording studio and Tarak breaks the mike in anger. With all her efforts gone to waste the doctor refers him to her professor. Tarak loses his job and becomes quite depressed. He is always haunted by sounds and without his job he starts feeling dis-oriented. One day he tries to commit suicide. Finally, the doctors send Tarak to a rehabilitation center where he is made to listen to recorded human voices daily to get back to normal.

== Cast ==
- Ritwik Chakraborty as Tarak Dutta
- Raima Sen as Ratna
- Churni Ganguly as Dr. Swati
- Victor Banerjee as Dr Sen
- Srijit Mukherji as Dibyendu
- Koushik Ganguly as the doctor
- Arun Guha Thakurta as Tarak's father

== Making ==
The shooting of the film started in October 2011. Firstly Rudranil Ghosh was thought of playing the lead character Tarak. But, later Ritwik Chakraborty was cast for this character. Shirsha Ray and Mainak Bhaumik are roped as the cinematographer and editor respectively, for the film.

== Release and reception ==
The film premiered on 10 December 2012 in Dubai Film Festival. The film had its theatrical release on April 12, 2013. The film was widely appreciated by reviewers. Leading Bengali newspaper Anandabazar Patrika called the film a "silent revolution" and gave it 9.5 out of 10 stars which was Anandabazar's all time highest. The Times of India in their review commented that the film was very much different from other contemporary Indian and Bengali films and they also offered a "bow" to director Kaushik Ganguly for making such a film on a crucial subject of cinema. Shobdo, in terms of its portrayal of a variety of sound and the difference among them, is widely viewed to be influenced by The Silence under the direction of Mohsen Makhmalbaf. To this day, it is not known whether or not the experimental film is based on a true story.

== Awards ==
The film won the 60th National Film Awards for Best Feature Film in Bengali.

== See also ==
- Soundtrack (film), 2011 Indian film on a similar premise
