= Lantrani =

- Release poster
- Directed by: Gurvinder Singh; Kaushik Ganguly; Bhaskar Hazarika
- Written by: Durgesh Singh
- Produced by: Pranay Garg; Piyush Dinesh Gupta
- Starring: Johny Lever; Jitendra Kumar; Jisshu Sengupta; Nimisha Sajayan
- Cinematography: Sandeep Yadav; Riju Das; Appu Prabhakar
- Edited by: Reema Kaur; Suresh Pai; Subhajit Singha
- Music by: Vinod K Ram; Indraadip Das Gupta; Abhishek Jain
- Production companies: Neeljai Films; NMKRH
- Distributed by: ZEE5
- Release date: 9 February 2024
- Running time: 99 minutes
- Country: India
- Language: Hindi

Lantrani is a 2024 Indian Hindi-language anthology comedy drama directed by Gurvinder Singh, Kaushik Ganguly, and Bhaskar Hazarika and written by Durgesh Singh. It stars Johny Lever, Jitendra Kumar, Jisshu Sengupta, and Nimisha Sajayan in the lead roles. Avinash Gupta contributes to the songwriting while the background score is crafted by Vinod K Ram, Indraadip Das Gupta, and Abhishek Jain. Produced by Pranay Garg and Piyush Dinesh Gupta under the banner of Neeljai Films and NMKRH, the film was released on 9 February 2024 on ZEE5.

== Cast ==
- Johny Lever
- Jitendra Kumar
- Jisshu Sengupta
- Sanjay Mahanand
- Boloram Das
- Nimisha Sajayan
- Rajesh Awasthi
- Bhagwan Tiwari

== Release ==
Lantranti was released on ZEE5 on 9 February 2024 without any theatrical release.

== Reception ==
Ronak Kotecha from The Times of India rated the film 3.5 stars out of 5 stars and said "Overall, 'Lantrani' is a deeply moving and entertaining concoction of stories telling the bitter truths of our system that continue to remain a way of life." Anindita Mukherjee from India Today rated the film 3 stars out of 5 stars and said "In case you have been looking for a realistic weekend watch that doesn't feel too heavy on the eyes or the head, 'Lantrani' could be your pick, barring a few hits and missesâ€æjust like life."

Saibal Chatterjee from NDTV rated the film 3 stars out of 5 stars and said "Although none of the three short fiction films is anywhere near the filmmaker's best work, the triptych works primarily because of the stylistic and thematic range that it offers." Snigdha Nalini from Outlook India rated the film 3.5 stars out of 5 stars and said "When three critically acclaimed directors come together for a series, you can expect a good watch. But sometimes this expectation is what pulls the story down. With 'Lantrani', the three directors have delivered their individual best."

Nandini Ramnath from Scroll.in said "A television network station that appears to be functioning out of a house comes up with what is hoped to be a revenue-earning solution to beat the health crisis." Pallabi Purkayastha from Times Now rated the film 2.5 stars out of 5 stars and said "All-in-all, Lantrani is that good boss you wish to see more of in life but, alas, she chooses to stick with the same bad corporate. A tad more sincerity, and Lantrani would have been the most-talked-about anthology of the year... If only the makers could get the finer details right."

Shreyas Pande from Cinema Express rated the film 1.5 stars out of 5 stars and said "Lantrani could have been a far better experience if the acclaimed filmmakers were given independent grounds to write and tell their stories. Here, it feels as if their own sensibilities are hacked to death and they are just technicians saying 'action' and 'cut'."
