= Washington Bangla Radio on Internet =

Radio station

Washington Bangla Radio on Internet (WBRi) is an online streaming Bengali language radio station and associated news and entertainment web portal that operated from Washington, DC metro area in the United States. The free service was provided until July 2016 by privately owned WBRi Inc. headquartered at Germantown, Maryland, United States, which also owned the trademark and has been featured in SPAN magazine published by the United States Department of State for bridging India-US cultures.

Founded in 2008 by Indian-American computing enthusiast Supratim Sanyal, Washington Bangla Radio is one of the oldest legal online Bengali radio stations with a private test stream running from 2005.

Washington Bangla Radio pioneered digital music download sales in the Bengali music segment and provides a highly targeted digital sales channel to record companies from Kolkata. Its online store service remains the only MP3 download store dedicated to Bengali music.

WBRi became the first South Asia-focused internet radio service to broadcast an event live globally from India on Sunday June 21, 2009, when it streamed Kolkata Music Academy's World Music Day Concert conducted by Abraham Mazumder directly from St. John's Church, the Oldest Cathedral in Kolkata where Job Charnock's Tomb is laid. It subsequently streamed more live events, with the first worldwide live video webcast from Kolkata of Balaka's Kali Puja from BD Block, Salt Lake in 2011.

For its contribution to growth of technology-based media convergence, the Gazette weekly[4] published from Montgomery County, Maryland featured WBRi on its front page.
