= Kaushik Ganguly =

Indian film director and actor

- কৌশিক গঙ্গোপাধ্যায়
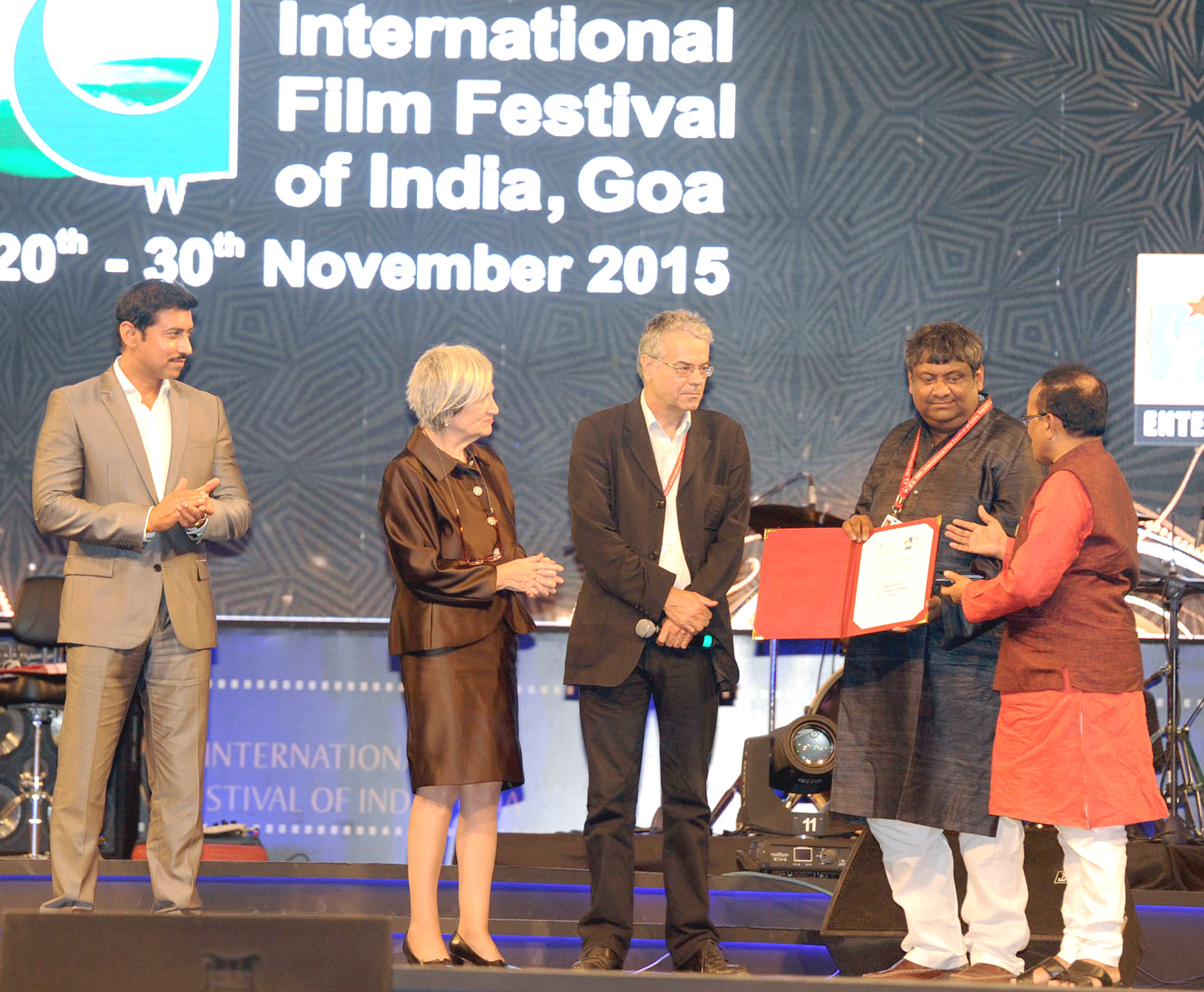
- Laxmikant Parsekar presenting the ICFT UNESCO Award to Kaushik Ganguly (2nd from right) for ‘CINEMAWALA’, at the 46th International Film Festival of India, in Panaji
- Education: Jadavpur University
- Occupations: Director, actor, screenwriter
- Notable work: Arekti Premer Golpo; Shabdo; Chotoder Chobi; Cinemawala; Bishorjan; Nagarkirtan; Jyeshthoputro; Dhumketu
- Spouse: Churni Ganguly (m. 1993)
- Children: Ujaan Ganguly (son)
- Parent: Sunil Ganguly (father)

Kaushik Ganguly (born 4 August 1968) is an Indian film director, screenwriter and actor in Bengali cinema. He has received several awards including six National Film Awards and four Filmfare Awards Bangla. Kaushik Ganguly is known for making films that explore various aspects sexuality, like Ushnatar Janye (2003), which deals with a lesbian relationship, and Arekti Premer Golpo (2010), which examines transgender identity & Nagarkirtan (2017), an LGBTQ Movie. In 2019, Film Companion ranked Ridhi Sen's performance in Nagarkirtan which was directed by Ganguly, among 100 Greatest Performances of the decade.

== Life ==
Ganguly was born in Kolkata on 4 August 1968. His father was guitarist Sunil Ganguly. He attended Ramakrishna Mission Vidyalaya, Narendrapur and later Jadavpur University where he worked on a degree in Bengali literature. While at university, he started a theatre troupe with his future wife actress Churni Ganguly and Suman Mukhopadhyay (who would later become a film director). In 1987, Ganguly began working as a screenwriter for Tollywood films. He married actress Churni Ganguly in January 1993 They have a son actor Ujaan Ganguly

In 1995, he moved to ETV Bangla to direct telefilms like Ushnatar Janye, Ulka and Aatithi. These telefilms incorporated elements like lesbianism and sex determination that had not been depicted in Bengali television productions before.

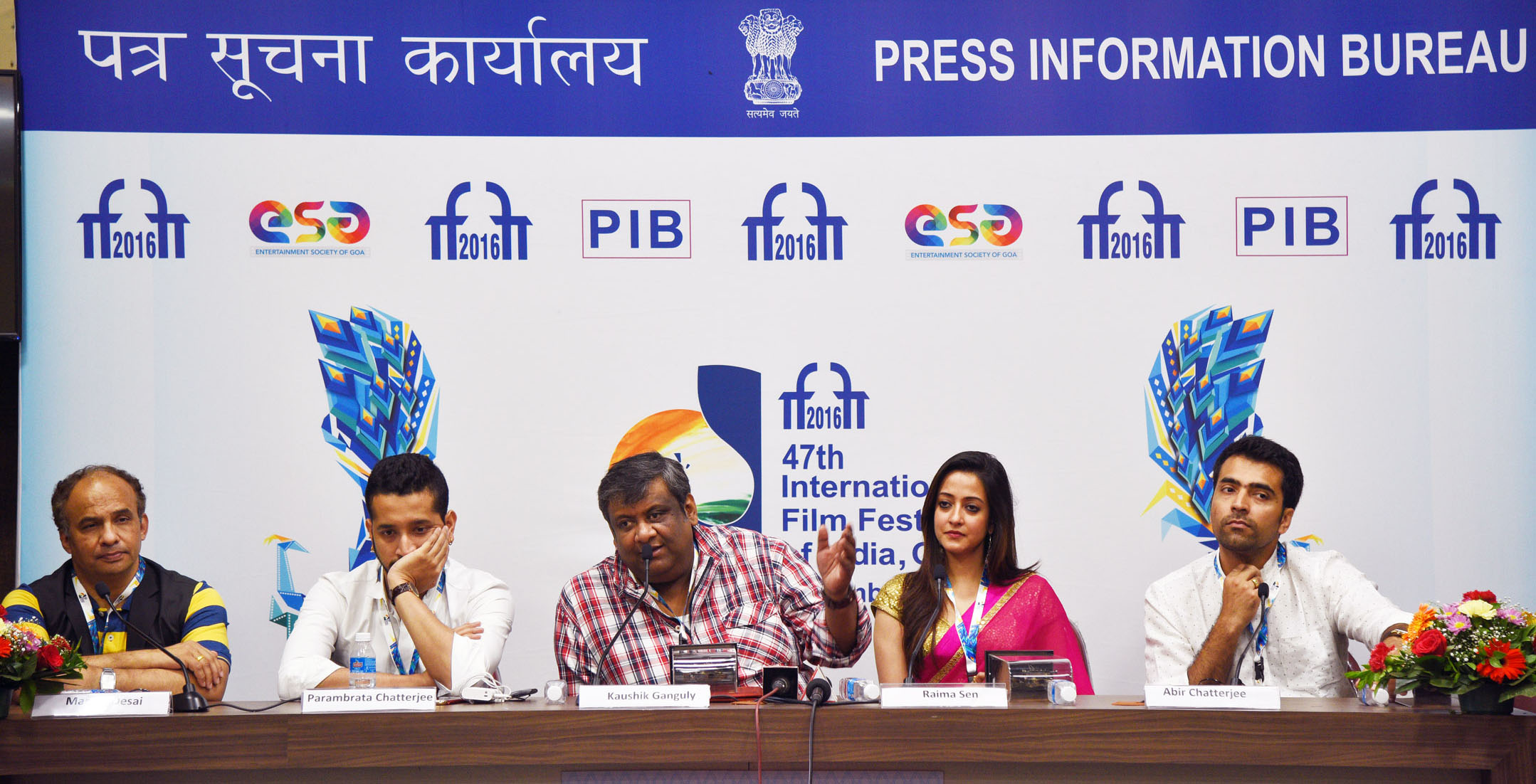
The Director Kaushik Ganguly with the Cast and crew of ‘Bastu Shaap’ at a press conference, during the 47th International Film Festival of India (IFFI-2016), in Panaji, Goa

== Career ==
Kaushik made his directorial debut with Waarish (2004). After his debut, over the years, he has directed more than 15 films and along the way has won several awards. Few of his most notable films include Laptop, which won the National Award for Best Background Music in 2011, Shabdo (2012), which won the National Award for Best Bengali Film and Chotoder Chobi (2015). His 2017 directorial venture includes Chaya O Chobi, a Bengali drama starring Abir Chatterjee, Koel Mallick and Ritwick Chakraborty, Nagarkirtan, an LGBTQ+ movie starring Riddhi Sen and Ritwick Chakraborty. his filmmking craft highly influenced by Gulzar and Rituparno Ghosh.

== Filmography ==
=== Director ===
Denotes films that have not yet been released

Year	Film	Ref
2004	Waarish	
2005	Shunyo E Buke	
2005	Ek Mutho Chabi	
2009	Brake Fail	
2009	Jackpot	
2010	Arekti Premer Golpo	
2011	Rang Milanti	
2012	Laptop	
2012	Shabdo	The film won the 60th National Film Awards for Best Feature Film in Bengali.
2013	C/O Sir	
2013	Apur Panchali	
2014	Khaad	
2014	Chotoder Chobi	
2016	Bastu Shaap	
2016	Cinemawala	
2017	Bishorjan	
2017	Chaya O Chobi	
2017	Nagarkirtan	National award Best Feature Film (special mention)
2018	Drishtikone	
2018	Kishore Kumar Junior	
2019	Bijoya	
2019	Jyeshthoputro	National Award for Best Original Screenplay
2022	Lokkhi Chele	
2023	Kaberi Antardhan	
2023	Ardhangini	
2023	Palaan	
2024	Lantrani	
2024	Ajogyo	
2025	Dhumketu	
2026	Aajo Ardhangini	
2027	Waiting Room	
2027	Tarpor	

==== Notable acting roles ====
Year	Film/ Web Series	Director
2010	Notobor Notout	Kamaleshwar Mukherjee
2012	Laptop	Kaushik Ganguly
2013	Kangal Malsat	Suman Mukhopadhyay
2014	Khaad	Kaushik Ganguly
2014	Nirbashito	Churni Ganguly
2014	Chotushkone	Srijit Mukherji
2016	Bastu Shaap	Kaushik Ganguly
2017	Bishorjan	Kaushik Ganguly
2018	Drishtikone	Kaushik Ganguly
2018	Ka Kha Ga Gha	Krishnendu Chatterjee
2019	Bijoya	Kaushik Ganguly
2019	Shankar Mudi	Aniket Chattopadhyay
2019	Tarikh	Churni Ganguly
2019	Saat No. Shanatan Sanyal	Annapurna Basu
2019	Kedara	Indraadip Dasgupta
2021	Ei Ami Renu	Saumen Sur
2022	Tiktiki (web series)	Dhrubo Banerjee
2022	Prankenstein (web series)	Sagnik Chatterjee
2022	Bismillah	Indraadip Dasgupta
2022	Kothamrito	Jiit Chakraborty
2022	Shubho Bijoya	Rohan Sen
2022	Uttwaran	Indraadip Dasgupta
2023	Shikarpur (web series)	Nirjhar Mitra
2023	Kaberi Antardhan	Kaushik Ganguly
2023	Aaro Ek Prithibi	Atanu Ghosh
2023	Rajneeti (web series)	Sourav Chakraborty
2024	Mirza	Sumeet - Saahil
2024	Rajneeti Season 2 (web series)	Sourav Chakraborty
2025	Shotyi Bole Shotyi Kichhu Nei	Srijit Mukherjee
2025	Binodiini: Ekti Natir Upakhyan	Ram Kamal Mukherjee
2025	Lokkhikantopur Local	Ram Kamal Mukherjee
2026	Saptadingar Guptodhon	Dhruvo Banerjee

==== Television ====
- Hariharan
- Ulka
- Aatithi
- Shesh Kritya
- Collage
- Chhayachhobi
- Chhadmabeshi (Starring Rudranil Ghosh, Jisshu Sengupta, Srabanti Chatterjee)
- Diagnosis
- De-Ray
- 2003: Ghare O Bairey
- 2003: Ushnatar Janye
- 2010: Bandhobi
- 2010: Bagh Nokh

=== Screenwriter ===
- 2005: Shunyo E Buke
- 2009: Jackpot
- 2010: Arekti Premer Golpo
- 2011: Rang Milanti
- 2012: Laptop

== Awards ==
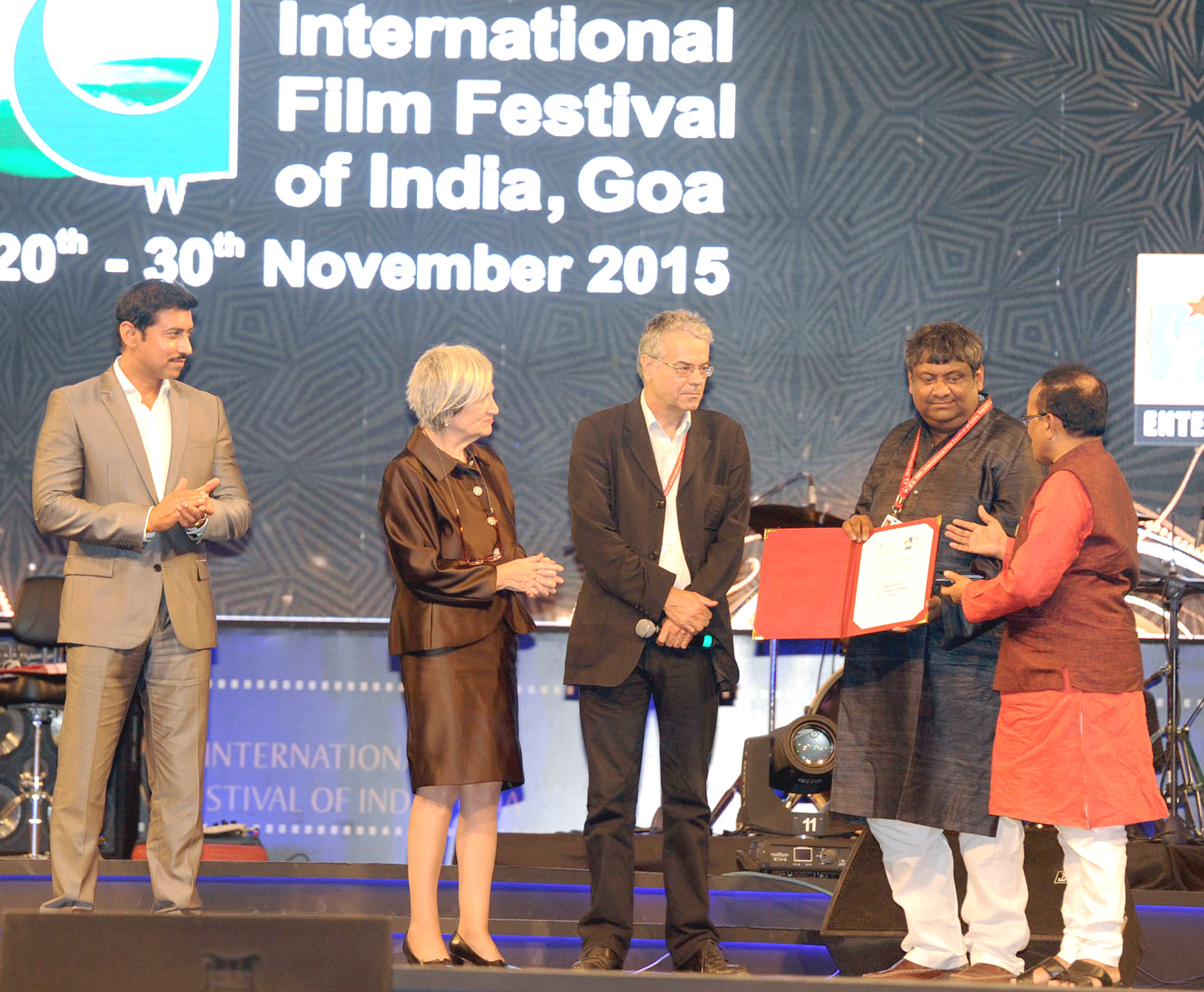
Ganguly (second from right) receiving the 'ICFT –UNESCO Award' for the film Cinemawala at IFFI 2015

Kaushik Ganguly received multiple awards for his role in various films.

- 2013: IFFI Best Director Award for the film "Apur Panchali" at the 44th International Film Festival of India

Year	Award edition	Film	Award
2012	60th National Film Awards	Shabdo	Best Feature Film in Bengali
2015	63rd National Film Awards	Chotoder Chobi	Best Film on Other Social Issues
2017	64th National Film Awards	Bishorjon	Best Feature Film in Bengali
2018	65th National Film Awards	Nagarkirtan	Special Jury Award (Feature Film)
2021	67th National Film Awards	Jyeshthoputro	Best Original Screenplay
2024	70th National Film Awards	Kaberi Antardhan	Best Feature Film in Bengali

- 2014: Nominated for Best Director for Shabdo in Filmfare Awards East
- 2014: Winner for Best Film Critic's Choice for Shabdoin Filmfare Awards Bangla 2014
- 2014: Nominated for Best Supporting Actor for Kangal Malsat in Filmfare Awards East
- 2015: IFFI ICFT UNESCO Gandhi Medal Cinemawala at 46th International Film Festival of India
- 2019: SAARC film festival 2019 in Colombo - Best Feature Film award for Nagarkirtan
- 2021: 4th Filmfare Awards Bangla for Best Director for Jyeshthoputro
- 2024 - 7th Filmfare Awards Bangla Best Supporting Actor for the film Aaro Ek Prithibi
- 2025 - 8th Filmfare Awards Bangla Best Diagloues - Ajogyo
