= Chhaya O Chhobi =

- Directed by: Kaushik Ganguly
- Written by: Kaushik Ganguly
- Story by: Kaushik Ganguly
- Produced by: Nispal Singh
- Starring: Abir Chatterjee; Koel Mallick; Ritwick Chakraborty; Churni Ganguly; Priyanka Sarkar
- Cinematography: Gopi Bhagat
- Edited by: Subhajit Singha
- Music by: Indraadip Dasgupta
- Production company: Surinder Films
- Distributed by: Surinder Films
- Release date: 25 August 2017
- Country: India
- Language: Bengali

Chhaya O Chhobi (transl. Shadow and Image) is an Indian Bengali language drama film directed by Kaushik Ganguly and produced by Nispal Singh under the banner of Surinder Films. The film features Abir Chatterjee, Koel Mallick, Ritwick Chakraborty, Churni Ganguly and Priyanka Sarkar in lead roles. The film's story was written by director Kaushik Ganguly. This film marks Koel Mullick's comeback after a 2-year hiatus.

== Plot ==
Maya, an Indian who has grown up in London, comes to Darjeeling to shoot her first ever Bengali film. The shoot was continuing unhindered until one fine morning, when Rai, the female lead of the film, is nowhere to be found. Even her fiancé and the male lead of the film, Arindam, has no clue, leaving everyone worried. The shoot is stalled until Rai decides to come back. Meanwhile, Rai ends up at a secluded resort amidst the jungles. For company, she only has the driver of her car, Jeetu.

As new friendships emerge and old ties are wounded, perhaps there is an old bond somewhere in the past, that gets mended as well. An entire film unit puts up at a heritage hotel in the lap of Himalayas while a love story opens up a new chapter as the shoot goes on.

Twist: Arindam asks Rai to disappear for few days so that producer will get her due cleared as early as possible. In the meanwhile, Arindam sleeps with Mou. Jeetu steals Mou's phone, where he sees their personal pictures and messages. He shares this with Rai. Rai breaks all the ties with Arindam. To conclude it is shown that Jeetu was Rai's classmate. He was keeping few stuffs in her room to evoke her childhood memories.

== Cast ==
- Abir as Arindam
- Koyel as Rai
- Ritwick Chakraborty as Jatin Manna / Jeetu
- Churni Ganguly as Maya
- Priyanka as Moumita Ghosh/ Mou
- Barun Chanda as Maya's Father

== Soundtrack ==
Chhaya O Chhobi

Soundtrack album by Indraadip Dasgupta
- Released: 16 November 2017
- Genre: Feature film soundtrack
- Length: 28:10
- Language: Bengali
- Label: Surinder Films

The soundtrack of the film comprises 6 songs composed by Indraadip Dasgupta the lyrics of which were written by Kaushik Ganguly.

Tracklist
No.	Title	Singer(s)	Length
1.	"Ekla Ekla"	Shreya Ghoshal	05:18
2.	"Chera Drawing Khata"	Papon	04:10
3.	"Eh Kancha"	Arijit Singh & Mainak Nandy	6:28
4.	"Amar Drawing Khata"	Anweshaa	03:47
5.	"Amar Drawing Khata" (Reprise)	Jasleen Royal	03:46
6.	"Arektu Uthleyi"	Anindya Chatterjee & Srijita Mitra	04:41
Total length:			28:10

== Critical reception ==
Shamayita Chakraborty of The Times of India gave the film a rating of 3 out of 5 and said that, "The film could’ve been tighter and shorter and is definitely not one of the best creations of Kaushik Ganguly. Having said that Chhaya O Chhobi is definitely a one-time watch for its picturesque portrayal of north Bengal and Ritwick’s brilliant performance." All About Bangla Cinema gave the film a rating of 4 out of 5 saying that, "Kaushik Ganguly’s “Chhaya O Chhobi” is sweet simple story about the changing equations of personal and professional relationships in the backdrop of an outdoor shooting of a film. It is a crossover between reel and real life where both the reel and real story goes on side by side."
