= Apur Panchali =

2014 Indian Bengali biopic film

- Theatrical release poster
- Directed by: Kaushik Ganguly
- Produced by: Shree Venkatesh Films
- Starring: Parambrata Chatterjee; Ardhendu Banarjee; Parno Mittra; Gaurav Chakrabarty
- Cinematography: Sirsha Ray
- Edited by: Bodhaditya Banerjee
- Music by: Indradeep Dasgupta
- Release dates: 25 November 2013 (IFFI); 25 April 2014 (India)
- Country: India
- Language: Bengali

Apur Panchali is a 2013 Bengali film directed by Kaushik Ganguly and produced by Shree Venkatesh Films. It is based on the life of Subir Banerjee, the actor who played Apu in Pather Panchali (1955), the first film of Satyajit Ray's Apu trilogy. Director Kaushik Ganguly won the award of best director for Apur Panchali in the 44th International Film Festival of India (IFFI) in November 2013. The director mentioned in an interview that he found similarities between certain parts of the life of Subir Banerjee and the iconic character Apu. The film uses several minutes of footage from Pather Panchali in its narrative.

== Plot ==
The film follows the journey of Subir Banerjee, the child actor who portrayed "Apu" of Satyajit Ray's masterpiece Pather Panchali. The events take place in two time periods. Present-day action is shot in color, whereas past events are in black and white. Parallels are drawn between Subir's life and the Apu trilogy throughout the film.

The film opens with film school student Arka coming to deliver a letter—an invitation to attend a prestigious award ceremony in Germany—to the older Subir Banerjee. Now retired, lost-in-the-crowd Subir initially doesn't want to receive the letter, but eventually agrees after Arka convinces him. Subir recounts his days working on Pather Panchali to Arka. They visit an old tumbledown house where the film was shot. Arka collects a brick from the house as a souvenir. Later, as they prepare for their journey to Germany, Subir narrates his life story to Arka.

After Subir's brother went away to work in Dhanbad, Subir, now in his 20s, had to give up his football career to take care of his ill father and help his mother in her household chores. On the advice of his friend, Subir married Ashima, the daughter of a wealthy villager in Burdwan, after his father died. Two years into their marriage, Ashima became pregnant.

In the present, Subir and Arka open up to each other. Arka talks about his late father, whom he deeply admired. Subir reveals that due to jaundice, Ashima gave premature birth and the baby died soon after. Ashima went into depression and died too. Subir became heart-broken and isolated himself.

As Arka and Subir board the plane to Germany, Arka thanks Subir, for this is his first business-class trip; to which Subir replies, that he ought to thank "Apu", as it is his first time on a plane.

Subir, on request of his mother, comes to return all of Ashima's belonging to her native house. Her grandmother asks him to bathe in the local pond and stay for lunch. Subir goes to the pond and as he prepares to bathe, a young boy asks him if his name is Apu, to which Subir weepingly nods (which actually means that the young boy is none other than Arka!)

As the credits roll, Subir Banerjee is shown being congratulated at the Internationaler Preis für Film- und Medienmusik, Germany.

== Cast ==
- Parambrata Chatterjee as young Subir Banerjee
- Ardhendu Banerjee as old Subir Banerjee
- Parno Mittra as Ashima
- Gaurav Chakrabarty as Arko
- Ritwick Chakraborty as Moloy
- Koushik Ganguly as Subir's office colleague
- Sova Sen as Ashima's grandmother

== Soundtrack ==
The Music and Background Score of the film is composed by music composer Indradeep Dasgupta. The background score of the film has been appreciated widely. On 4 April 2014 - a song from the soundtrack titled Apur Paayer Chhaap sung by Arijit Singh was released.

Track listing
No.	Title	Singer	Length
1.	"Apur Paayer Chhaap"	Arijit Singh	3:46
2.	"Apur Paayer Chhaap (Unplugged)"	Arijit Singh	3:22

== Release ==
The film was screened at the 44th International Film Festival of India (IFFI) in November 2013 and was received warmly. Kaushik Ganguly received the Best Director Award for the film there.

The film was released on 25 April 2014, and gained wide critical acclaim.
