= Laptop (2012 film) =

2012 Indian Bengali-language film

- Film poster
- Directed by: Kaushik Ganguly
- Screenplay by: Kaushik Ganguly
- Produced by: Gautam Kundu
- Starring: Rahul Bose; Churni Ganguly; Saswata Chatterjee; Ananya Chatterjee; Kaushik Ganguly; Gaurav Chakrabarty; Ridhima Ghosh
- Cinematography: Sirsha Ray
- Music by: Mayookh Bhaumik
- Distributed by: Brand Value Communications Limited
- Release date: 13 April 2012
- Running time: 120 Minutes
- Country: India
- Language: Bengali

Laptop is a 2012 Indian Bengali language drama Film written and directed by Kaushik Ganguly. It tells different stories of people connected by a single laptop, according to the director, the laptop is the antagonist of the film and not just a common thread between the main characters. It went to the 2011 IFFI and the 2011 Dubai Film Festival.

== Cast ==
- Rahul Bose as Indra
- Churni Ganguly as Durba
- Saswata Chatterjee as Gaurav
- Ananya Chatterjee as Subha
- Kaushik Ganguly as Partha
- Rajesh Sharma as Rakesh
- Pijush Ganguly as Tarun
- Arindam Sil as Doctor Sengupta
- Gaurav Chakrabarty as Jiyon
- Ridhima Ghosh as Raya
- Arun Guhathakurta as Shital
- Aparajita Adhya as Saheli
- Anjana Basu as Sumana (guest appearance)
- Jojo as Ritu (guest appearance)
- Neha Kapoor as Amrita
- Pratyay Basu as Soumya

== Music ==
- Mayookh Bhaumik - Music Composer
- Anirban Sengupta and Dipankar Chaki - Sound

== Awards ==
=== 59th National Film Awards ===
- Best Background Music - Mayookh Bhaumik
