= Khaad =

2014 Indian Bengali film

- Directed by: Kaushik Ganguly
- Screenplay by: Kaushik Ganguly
- Story by: Prasen (Prasenjit Mukherjee), Srijato
- Produced by: Shrikant Mohta and Mahendra Soni
- Starring: Pallavi Chatterjee; Ardhendu Banerjee; Lily Chakravarty; Rudranil Ghosh; Gargi Roy Choudhury
- Cinematography: Soumik Haldar
- Edited by: Bodhaditya Banerjee
- Music by: Indraadip Dasgupta
- Production companies: Shree Venkatesh Films & Surinder Films
- Release date: 7 November 2014
- Running time: 140 minutes
- Country: India
- Language: Bengali

Khaad (Bengali: খাদ; English: Abyss) is a 2014 Indian Bengali film directed by Kaushik Ganguly. It is about a story of a group of people trying to make-out alive of a situation that tests their strength, patience and resilience.

== Plot ==
Because of a taxi strike, a group of tourists, mostly unrelated to each other, get stuck in New Mal Junction. These people are honeymooners, family vacationers, an ailing mother and her son, a priest, an actress and her mentally challenged brother, one trekker, a bus conductor, and a retired teacher. One of the tourists, the priest manages to arrange a bus from the church for them to reach North Bengal. The other tourists also join him in the bus trip, but unfortunately the bus meets with a terrible accident. It falls off a cliff into an abyss, but the tourists survive with minor injuries. Injured and traumatized, they realize that they have become completely detached from any form of human contact. It was also not possible to climb 400–500 ft so easily during the daylight hours that were remaining that day. So they decide to spend that night there and think they will try to find another way out the next day. While spending that night, they decide to play a game. The priest suggests a game which is to reveal everyone's secret or anything that the person wants to confess to the world but never gathered courage. This secret is to be left behind in the abyss and from the next day, they could begin afresh. Everyone agrees. Gradually, the situation starts to change while the game progresses. Everyone's darkest secrets are revealed one by one. This goes on until the wee hours of the night.

At the end of the film, it is revealed that all the tourists had died in the tragic accident, and the game that has been shown throughout the movie, had actually not happened at all. All of them lie dead on a truck. Finally, all the characters walk across the forested area in the abyss—towards the path of peace, as the credits start to roll.

== Cast ==
- Pallavi Chatterjee as Shiuli Jana, Meghna's mother
- Ardhendu Banerjee as Church Father
- Lily Chakravarty as Sabita, Khokan's mother
- Rudranil Ghosh as Paltan
- Gargi Roychowdhury as Aparna Banerjee
- Kaushik Ganguly as Khokan
- Bharat Kaul as Sidhartha, Doctor
- Saheb Bhattacharya as Jeet, Punam's husband
- Mimi Chakraborty as Punam
- Tanushree Chakraborty as Moumita Paul
- Tridha Choudhury as Meghna
- Kamaleswar Mukherjee as Rajib, Trekker
- Kaushik Banerjee as Mohan Jana, Shiuli's Husband
- Rajdeep Ghosh as Avik, Aparna's Brother
- Maasud Akthar as Tiwari Ji
- Ankita Mazumder
- Praytay Basu as Tito, Meghna's brother

== Soundtrack ==
Track listing
No.	Title	Singer(s)	Length
1.	"Ami Achi"	Arijit Singh	6:14
2.	"Asatoma Sadgamaya"	Arijit Singh	5:18
3.	"Mutho Aaj"	Indraadip Dasgupta	3:45
4.	"Mutho Aaj (Reprise)"	Arnob	4:38
5.	"Khaad Theme"	Instrumental
