= Indraadip Dasgupta =

Indian composer (born 1973)

- Born: 17 January 1973 (age 53); Calcutta, West Bengal, India
- Occupations: Music director; Singer; Musician; Film director
- Years active: 2003–present

Indraadip Dasgupta (born 17 January 1973) is an Indian composer whose range of music is well known in various Bengali films.

In 2017 he worked in Begum Jaan, for which he composed the background score.

== Film director ==
Denotes films that have not yet been released

Year	Film	Ref.
2019	Kedara	
2022	Bismillah	
2022	Agantuk	
2022	Uttwaran	
2025	Grihapravesh	
2026	Abhhiman	

== Music director (Bengali films) ==
Denotes films that have not yet been released

Year	Film	Songs	Notes
2004	Teen Ekke Teen	"All songs"	Debut
2004	Prohor	"All songs"	
2008	Bor Asbe Ekhuni	4 songs – Baba Amar Ki Biye Hobe Na, Saiyaan (Slow), Saiyaan (Female), Saiyaan (Male)	Along with Jeet Gannguli
2009	Kaler Rakhal	"All songs"	
2009	Bishh	"All songs"	
2009	Ei Prithibi Tomar Aamar	"All songs"	
2010	Le Chakka	"All songs"	
2011	Shotru	"All songs"	
2011	Fighter	"All songs"	
2011	Jaani Dekha Hobe	5 songs – Thik Thakish, Jaani Dekha Hobe (Male), Phire Jaa Re Mon Ja, Jaani Dekha Hobe (Female), Jaani Dekha Hobe (Reprise)	Along with Neel Dutt
2011	Chaplin	"All songs"	
2012	Charuulata	"All songs"	
2012	3 Kanya	"All songs"	
2013	Hawa Bodol	"All songs"	
2013	Kanamachi	Mon Baware	Along with Rishi Chanda
2013	Proloy	"All songs"	
2013	Mishawr Rahasya	"All songs"	
2013	Mrs. Sen	"All songs"	
2013	Chander Pahar	"All songs"	Along with Debojyoti Mishra
2014	Obhishopto Nighty	"All songs"	
2014	Golpo Holeo Shotti	"All songs"	
2014	Yoddha	3 songs – Sharatadin, Aami Tomar Kache, Ebar Jeno Onno Rokom Pujo	Along with Savvy
2014	Khaad	"All songs"	
2015	Chotoder Chobi	"All songs"	
2015	Asche Bochhor Abar Hobe	"All songs"	
2015	Roga Howar Sohoj Upaye	"All songs"	
2015	Parbona Ami Chartey Tokey	"All songs"	
2015	Rajkahini	"All songs"	Along with Rabindranath Tagore
2015	Shudhu Tomari Jonyo	1 songs – Shudhu Tomari Jonno (Title Track)	Along with Arindam Chatterjee
2015	Bastu Shaap	"All songs"	
2016	Shikari	"All songs"	Bangladesh-India joint venture
2016	Kelor Kirti	1 songs – Item Bomb	Along with Dev Sen
2016	Aynabaji	as background score	Bangladesh, Along with Arnob, Fuad, Habib Wahid, Chirkutt
2016	Haripada Bandwala	"All songs"	
2017	Tomake Chai	"All songs"	
2017	Ami Je Ke Tomar	"All songs"	
2017	Chaya O Chobi	"All songs"	
2017	Yeti Obhijaan	"All songs"	
2018	Kabir	"All songs"	
2018	Kishore Kumar Junior	"All songs"	Along with Shyamal Mitra, Shankar–Jaikishan, R.D. Burman, Hemanta Mukherjee
2019	Bijoya	"Tomar Pasher Desh"	
2019	Mukherjee Dar Bou	"Kobe Ashbe", "E Jibon Tomar Sathe", "Himshim"	Along with Rabindranath Tagore
2022	Kakababur Protyaborton	"All Songs"	
2022	Habji Gabji	All songs	
2022	Dharmajuddha	All songs	
2022	Bismillah	All songs	
2023	Kabuliwala	All songs	
2024	Kaantaye Kaantaye	All songs	ZEE5 Original Series
2024	Ajogyo	"Keu Janbe Na"	Along with Anupam Roy and Ranajoy Bhattacharjee
2024	Babli	All songs	
2024	Shastri	All songs	
2025	Antaratma	All songs	
2025	Grihapravesh	All songs	
2025	Lawho Gouranger Naam Rey	Four Songs	Along with Kabir Suman, Girish Ghosh, Tamalika Golder and Souptik Mazumdar
2026	Vijaynagar'er Hirey	All songs	

== Music director (Hindi films) ==
Background Score

- 2017 Begum Jaan
- 2026 Naye Naye Taare (Short film on YouTube)

Music Director

- 2020 Babloo Bachelor

== Awards ==
- 2008 Anandalok Award nomination for Bor Asbe Ekhuni
- 2010 Anandolok Purashkar nomination for Le Chakka
- Mirchi Music Awards Bangla 2011 for best Background Score at Bengali film Baishe Srabon
- Mirchi Music Awards Bangla for best album 'Mon Fakira'
- Star guide film award for best music director 2011 for Chaplin
- Mirchi Music Awards Bangla 2016 for Best Popular Soundtrack for Parbona Ami Chartey Tokey
- Bengal Film Journalists' Association - Best Music Director Award 2018 for Sahaj Paather Gappo
- West Bengal Film Journalists' Association – Best Music Director Award 2019 for Ek Je Chhilo Raja
- 2019 Special Jury Award at the 66th National Film Awards for Bengali film Kedara

== See also ==
- Harabo Toke, romantic Bengali song
