= Indrasish Roy =

Indian Bengali actor

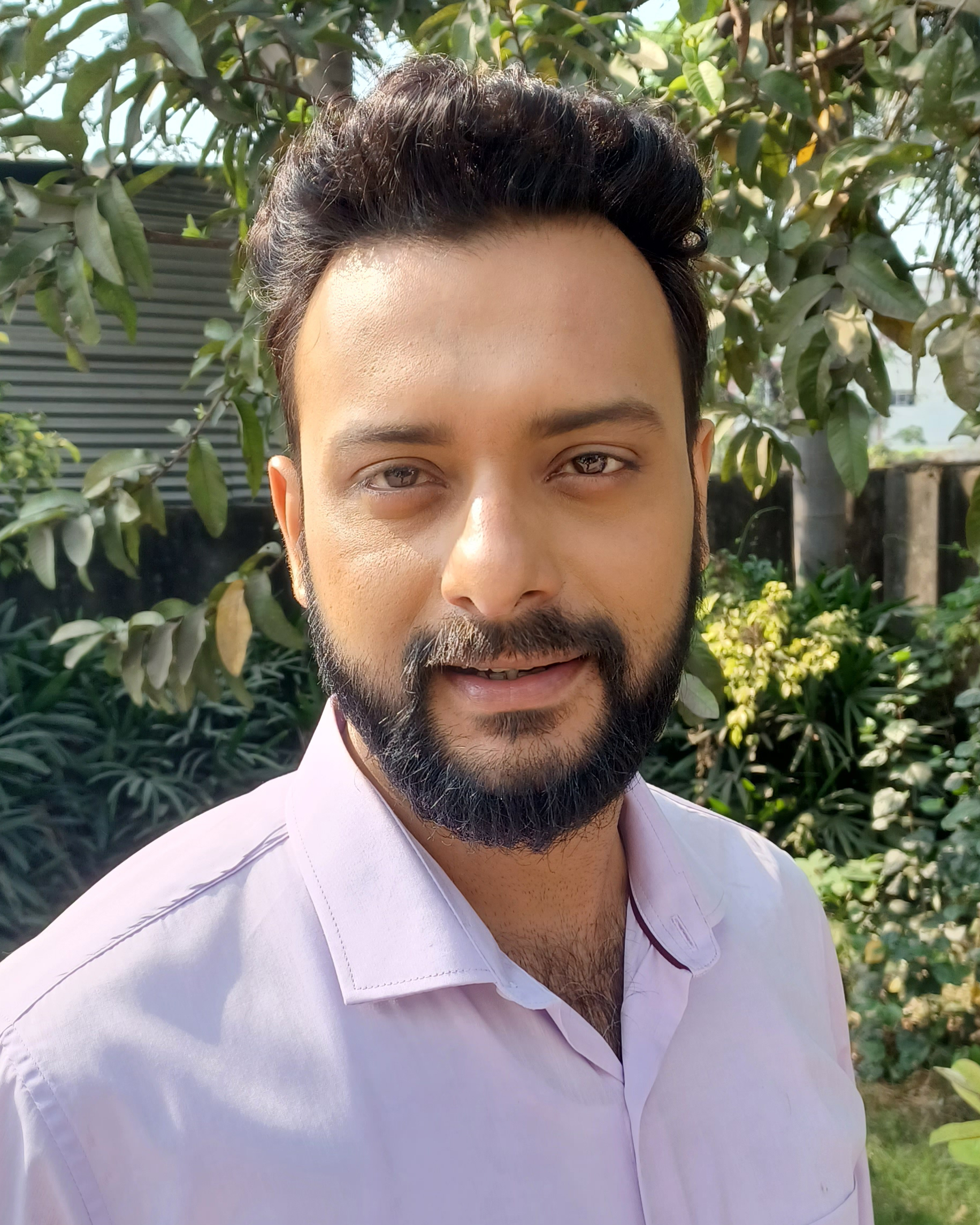
- Roy in 2024
- Born: 15 November 1986 (age 39); Kolkata, West Bengal, India
- Occupation: Actor
- Years active: 2008 – present
- Known for: Gaaner Oparey (2010–2011); Adwitiya(2011 - 2012); Dhulokona (2021–2022)
- Height: 5 ft 11 in (180 cm)
- Spouse: Souravi Tarafdar

Indrasish Roy is an Indian film and television actor. He played the role of Tintin in the serial Gaaner Opare. Later he played the lead role of Chandrakiran Chowdhury, the male protagonist of the serial Adwitiya. He debuted in films with Kaushik Ganguly's Rang Milanti. He also won hearts by playing the role of Lalon in Star Jalsha's Dhulokona.

== Career ==
Indrasish Roy started his career as an assistant director of the short film And There Wasn't Ever After in 2008. He made his acting debut in the television series Champion in 2009 on Akash Bangla, where he played an antagonist, Ronnie. In 2010, he had his major break in the Bengali serial Gaaner Opare, where he played the role of Tintin. After that, he played the male lead character, Chandrakiran Chowdhury aka "Chand", in Adwitiya in 2011 on Star Jalsa. He also did a small stint in mega serial Subarnalata in 2012 on Zee Bangla, where he played the character Sunirmal, who showed solidarity with Bokul, Subaranalata's daughter. After his stints in television, he moved on to films like Rang Milanti, The Play, Hrid Majharey, Aamar Aami, and Chotushkone.

=== Gaaner Oparey ===
Gaaner Oparey, an Indian Bengali-language television serial, was produced by Ideas Creations, the production house of Prosenjit Chatterjee. It aired on Star Jalsha from 28 June 2010 to 16 April 2011. It was a tribute to the Indian Nobel laureate Rabindranath Tagore on his 150th birth anniversary. The script was written by Indian director and actor Rituparno Ghosh. Debojyoti Mishra directed the music, and Dipankar De, Sabyasachi Chakraborty, Mimi Chakraborty, Gaurav Chakraborty, Arjun Chakraborty, and Anindita Bose were involved with the project.

Indrasish portrayed the character of Tintin (Trinanjon Banerjee) in the serial, a camera man working for the Shohor TV channel.

=== Adwitiya ===
Adwitiya, a production by Ideas Creations (Prosenjit Chatterjee), revolved around a young girl who goes to a rural village to chase her dreams and takes up the cudgels of putting this village on the path of progress. Shot with the Sunderbans as a backdrop, it was scripted by Anuja Chattopadhyay and Kausik Bhattacharya and directed by Joydeep Mukherjee.

Indrasish played the male lead character Chandrakiran Chowdhury, popularly known as "Chand" in the serial, along with Sohini Sarkar and Gaurav Chakraborty. He rose to mass popularity and won the award for Best Couple (along with Sohini Sarkar) at Star Jalsa Paribar Awards 2012.

=== Rang Milanti ===
Indrasish made his silver screen debut with the film Rang Milanti, a romantic comedy directed by Kaushik Ganguly, that released in September 2011 to wide critical and commercial acclaim.

He played Tito in the film, an aspiring director who is in love with an ad-agency employee, Kamalika (Ridhima Ghosh). The movie also starred Churni Ganguly, Saswata Chatterjee, Gaurav Chakraborty, Gourab Chatterjee, Ridhima Ghosh, and Tanaji Dasgupta.

=== The Play ===
Indrasish played the central character "Mainak" in the 2013 Bengali film The Play (film), a non-political mystery murder thriller revolving around the premises of a theater group in Kolkata. The film was scripted and directed by Ranjay Ray Choudhury and was presented by Magic Entertainments. The music was composed by Joy Sarkar.

He plays Mainak, an struggling actor who moves to Kolkata, the City of Joy hoping to make a name for himself. He joins a theatre group but an unexpected night brings a sudden change in his life. In the film he shares the screen with actors such, as Rajesh Sharma and Mumtaz Sorcar.

=== Hrid Majharey ===
Hrid Majharey is a critically acclaimed 2014 Bengali film directed by debutant director Ranjan Ghosh. The film is a tribute to William Shakespeare on the occasion of his 450th birthday. The plot revolves around a love story that is loosely inspired by certain iconic works of Shakespeare.

Indrasish played the character of Shubhro in the film, a charming, lively young man from Kolkata who runs an NGO in the Andaman Islands and is passionate about electronic music. He shared screen space with actors Abir Chatterjee and Raima Sen in the film.

=== Aamar Aami ===
Aamar Aami is a 2014 Bengali film directed by debutant director Orko Sinha. This film deals with multiple wishes, desires and dreams of people living in the fast-paced city. The film featured actors Rahul Banerjee, Biswanath Basu, and Arunima Ghosh along with Indrasish Roy and others.

Indrasish played the character Soumya in the film, an aspiring young photographer with an engineering background who struggles to get a job in the media industry. Indrasish also appeared in the film Reunion by Murari M Rakshit.

=== Dhulokona ===
Dhulokona is an Indian Bengali serial written by Leena Gangopadhyay and was produced by the banner Magic Moments Motion Pictures on Star Jalsha. The show came on-air on 19 July 2021 and went off-air on 11 December 2022 after telecasting 505 episodes. This show revolved around a maid and a driver, who is also a rap singer, working in an upper-middle-class family and their relationship despite both of them having ample ups and downs in their lives and trying to keep people happy and by proving that even being unsuccessful in life, a person can prove himself/herself successful.

Indrasish played the character of Lalon, the driver of the upper-middle-class family as well as a rap singer. He played the lead role opposite to Manali Dey.

== Other ventures ==
Apart from acting, Indrasish is an active participant in the Celebrity Cricket League, where he plays for` the Bengal Tigers and has performed consistently in the 2012, 2013, 2014 and 2015 series as an all-rounder player. Indrasish has been passionate about cricket since childhood and has been quoted as saying, "Getting into the shooting floor was by mistake. He was meant to be a Cricketer."

== Filmography ==
Year	Movie	Director	Role	Ref.
2011	Rang Milanti	Kaushik Ganguly	Tito	
2013	The Play	Ranjay Ray Choudhury	Mainak	
2014	Hrid Majharey	Ranjan Ghosh	Shubhro	
2014	Aamar Aami	Orko Sinha	Soumya Chowdhury	
2014	Chotushkone	Srijit Mukherji	Ritwick	
2015	Lorai: Play to Live	Parambrata Chatterjee	Deepnarayan Chowdhury	
2015	Fakebook	Sanjay Bardhaan	Vidyan	
2015	Jomer Raja Dilo Bor	Abir Sengupta	Boss	
2016	Kuheli	Debarati Gupta	Sayak	
2016	Teenanko	Bithin Das	Haran Majhi	
2017	Durga Sohay	Arindam Sil	Shuvo	
2017	Nagarkirtan	Kaushik Ganguly	Subhash Da	
2018	Crisscross	Birsa Dasgupta	TBA	
2019	Adda	Devayush Chowdhary	Rudro	
2021	Golondaaj	Dhrubo Banerjee	Jeetendra	
2022	Lokkhi Chele	Kaushik Ganguly	Rajat Narayan Roy	
2023	Maayakumari	Arindam Sil		
2026	Aajo Ardhangini	Kaushik Ganguly	Ranjan Laha	
2027	Sesh Obdhi	Sourav Palodhi		

== Television ==
Year	Series	Channel	Role	Production company(s)
2009	Champion	Akash Bangla	Ronnie	Ideas Creations
2010–2011	Gaaner Oparey	Star Jalsha	Tintin	Ideas Creations
2011–2012	Adwitiya	Star Jalsha	Chand	Ideas Creations
2012	Subarnalata	Zee Bangla	Sunirmal	Balaji Telefilms
2017	Swapno Udaan	Star Jalsha	Inspector Aniruddha Roy	Boyhood Productions
2017	Premer Kahini	Star Jalsha	RJ Raj Roy Chowdhury	Shree Venkatesh Films
2019	Bajlo Tomar Alor Benu	Star Jalsha	Rudradeb Pal aka Rudra	Agnidev Chatterjee Productions
2021–2022	Dhulokona	Star Jalsha	Lalon Chatterjee	Magic Moments Motion Pictures
2023	Balijhor	Star Jalsha	Srot Basu	Magic Moments Motion Pictures
2023– 2024	Jol Thoi Thoi Bhalobasha	Star Jalsha	Ashman Ghosh	Magic Moments Motion Pictures
2024	Horogouri Pice Hotel	Star Jalsha	Rudra (Later Replaced by Arnab Banerjee)	Jisshu Ujwal Sengupta Productions
2025–2026	Sriman Bhogoban Das	Zee Bangla Sonar	Bhogoban Shiv	Ideas Creation

== Web series ==
Year	Web Series	Platform	Role
2019	Astey Ladies	Hoichoi	Subham
2020	Byomkesh Season 5	Hoichoi	Abhay
2020	Damayanti	Hoichoi	Samaresh
2020	Nokol Heere	Hoichoi	Samaresh
2021	Khelaa Ssuru	Klikk	
2021	Amra 2GayTher	Klikk	
2022	Feludar Goyendagiri	Hoichoi	Young Birupakkho Majumdar
2023	Bodhon	Hoichoi	Sukhen Chowdhury
2024	Lojja	Hoichoi	Lawyer
2024	Kaalratri	Hoichoi	Rudra
2025	@Followers	Klikk	
2026	Kaalratri 2	Hoichoi	Rudra
2026	Choddobeshi	Hoichoi	Sankhadeep

== Awards ==
- Best Couple Award:- Star Jalsha Paribar Awards 2012 (Alongside Sohini Sarkar) for megaserial Adwitiya
