= Byomkesh (2014 TV series) =

2014 Indian Bengali crime television series

- Official poster
- Genre: Detective, Thriller
- Created by: Dag Creative Media
- Based on: Byomkesh Bakshi by Sharadindu Bandyopadhyay
- Written by: Sourav Sengupta
- Screenplay by: Joy Dasgupta
- Directed by: Amit Sengupta; Gopal Chakraborty; Joydeep Mukherjee
- Creative director: Mainak Bhaumik
- Starring: Gaurav Chakrabarty; Ridhima Ghosh; Saugata Bandyopadhyay
- Composer: Neel Dutt
- Country of origin: India
- Original language: Bengali
- No. of seasons: 1
- No. of episodes: 155

Production
- Producer: Rana Sarkar
- Cinematography: Kiranmay Bhuiyan
- Editors: Shibu Sarkar; Toton Maiti
- Running time: Approx. 43 minutes
- Production company: Daag Creative Media

Original release
- Network: Colors Bangla
- Release: 20 November 2014 – 14 November 2015

Byomkesh was a 2014 Indian Bengali crime fiction television series based on the Bengali sleuth Byomkesh Bakshi created by Sharadindu Bandyopadhyay. The series starred Gaurav Chakrabarty, Saugata Bandyopadhyay and Ridhima Ghosh as Byomkesh Bakshi, Ajit and Satyabati respectively. The series premiered on 20 November 2014 on Colors Bangla channel and is due to end on 14 November 2015. This series was re-run on 4 March 2024. The first episode was narrated by Sabyasachi Chakrabarty.

== Summary ==
Byomkesh Bakshi (Gaurav Chakrabarty) is a young Bengali private detective who solves spine-chilling cases with his chronicler and associate Ajit Bandyopadhyay (Saugata Bandyopadhyay).

== Cast ==
=== Main ===
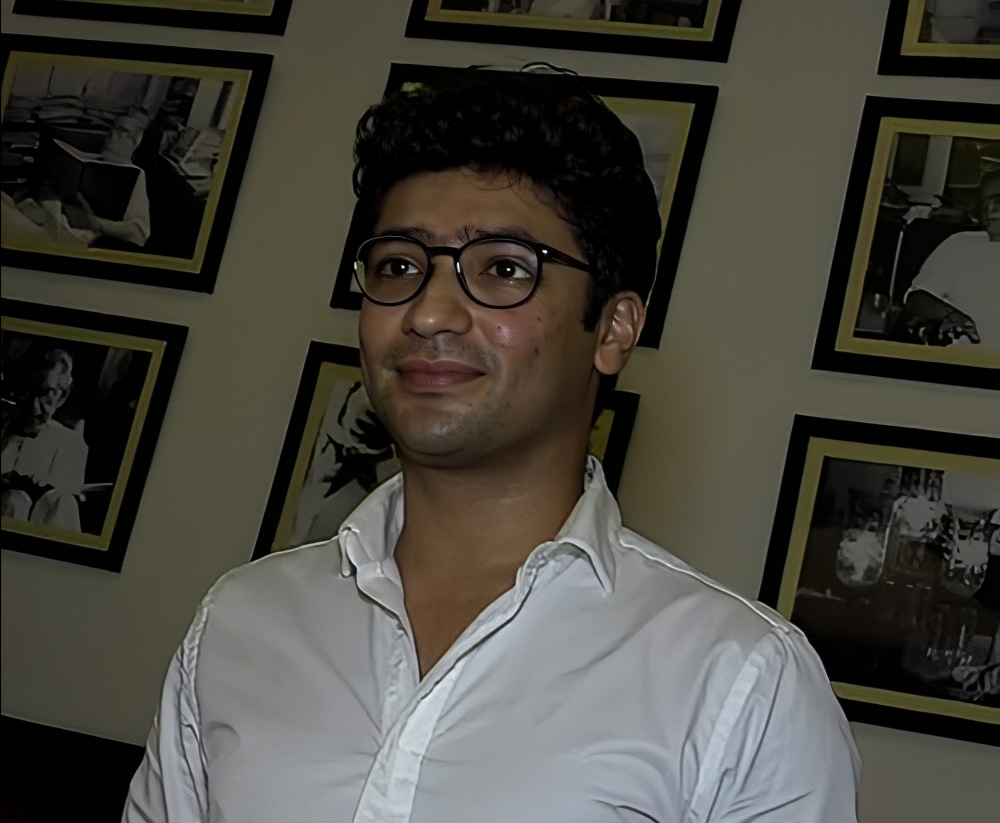
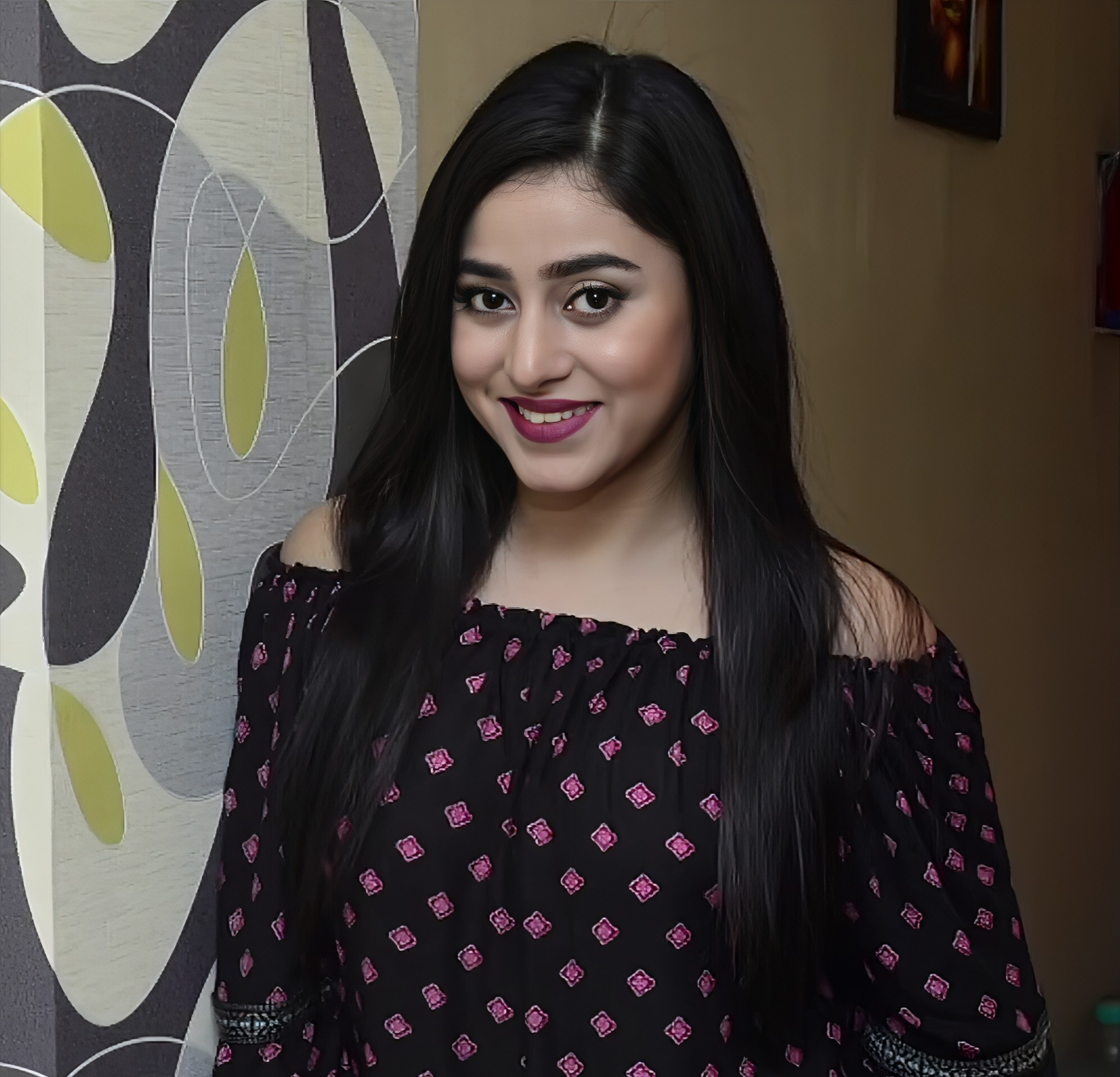
Top row: Gaurav Chakrabarty, Ridhima Ghosh.
Bottom row: Ridhima Ghosh, Gaurav Chakrabarty.
- Gaurav Chakrabarty as Byomkesh Bakshi
- Saugata Bandyopadhyay as Ajit Kumar Banerjee
- Ridhima Ghosh as Satyabati

=== Episodic appearance ===
- Kaushik Bhattacharya as DSP Purandar Pandey
- Krishnendu Dewanji as Inspector Rakhal Sarkar
- Arjun Chakrabarty as Debashish Bhatta
- Amrita Chattopadhyay as Deepa Bhatta
- Paran Bandyopadhyay as Anukul Babu
- Dwijen Bandyopadhyay as Ashwini Babu
- Partha Sarathi Deb as Ghanashyam Babu
- Vikram Chatterjee as Bilash Mallick
- Ena Saha as Shoiloja/Hina Mullick (Note: Ena Saha appeared in two different stories;first as Shoiloja and next as Hina Mullick)
- Prasun Gain as Prafulla Roy
- Arun Bannerjee as Sir Digindra Narayan
- Arindol Bagchi as Bidhu Babu, Train Ticket collector
- Neel Mukherjee as Nandadulal Babu
- June Malia as Rebecca Lite
- Sourav Das as a freedom fighter
- Sourav Saha as Sukumar
- Loknath Dey as Makhanlal
- Debapratim Dasgupta as Motilal
- Biplab Dasgupta as Chintamoni Kundu
- Saptarshi Roy as Nilmoni Majumdar
- Anirban Guha as DSP of Munger, Shashanka Babu
- Chandan Sen as Dr. Debkumar Sarkar
- Sumanta Mukherjee as Dr. Rudra
- Subhasish Mukherjee as Boroda
- Anindya Banerjee as Shailendra Babu/Bhuban Das
- Phalguni Chatterjee as Kaligati Bhattacharya/Suropoti
- Tarun Chakraborty as Police Inspector
- Debranjan Nag as Mamdo
- Deepak Haldar as Ramanath Niyogi
- Rupa Bhattacharya as Pramila Pal/Shanta Sen/Tapan Sen/Medini
- Rajat Ganguly as Mahidar Choudhury
- Kanchana Moitra as Malati
- Ardhendu Bannerjee as Dr. Pannalal Palit
- Rajdeep Gupta as Inspector Ratikanta Chowdhury
- Basudeb Mukherjee as Deep Narayan Singh
- Amitava Das as Ramapoti/Bijoy Madhab Mukherjee
- Prantik Banerjee as Nitai
- Deepankar De as Ishan Chandra Majumder
- Tapas Paul as Sadhu/Ramkishore Babu
- Rudranil Ghosh as Bangshidhar
- Kaushik Sen as Manilal
- Kanchan Mullick as Murlidhar
- Sudipta Chakraborty as Haripriya
- Parno Mittra as Tulsi
- Kushal Chakraborty as Nishanath Sen
- Sampurna Lahiri as Sunaina
- Bidipta Chakraborty as Mrs. Roy
- Joyjit Banerjee as Sharup Kumar/Rajkumar Basu
- Shantilal Mukherjee as Santosh Samaddar
- Anindya Bose as Prabal Mallick
- Hritojeet Chottopadhyay as Kumar Tridibendra Narayan Rai Bahadur
- Aditi Chatterjee as Damayanti Sen
- Jayanta Dutta Burman as Kamal Krishna Das
- Badshah Maitra as Dr. Bhujangadhar Das
- Vivaan Ghosh as Satyakam Das
- Rohit Mukherjee as Ushapati Das
- Partha Pratim Dutta as Sunil Sarkar
- Tribikram Ghosh as Ramani Mohan Babu
- Sandip Dey as Nepal Gupta
- Indrajit Deb as Dr Sen
- Rana Mitra as Gangadhar(Benimadhab's Son in Law)
- Shreyasree Samanta as Laboni
- Saurav Palodhi as Amritya
- Rii Sen as Mohini Dutta
- Rajesh kr Chattopadhyay as Sanat
- Nibedita Chakraborty as Chameli(Santosh Samaddar's Wife)
- Ditipriya Roy as Chingri
- Arijit Bhusan Bagchi as Assistant Film Director
- Tamal Roy Chowdhury as Uday Madhab Mukherjee(Deepa's and Bijoy's Grandfather)
- Sayak Chakraborty as Rathin
- Indrajit Mazumder as Phanish Chakraborty
- Ashok Mukherjee as Manish Chakraborty
- Sourav Chakraborty as Madhumoy Ghosh
- Judhajit Banerjee as Inspector Pramod Barat
- Kanyakumari Mukherjee / Soumili Biswas as Sulochana
- Samir Biswas as Pranhori Poddar
- Rishav Basu as Bijoy Sen/Amar Pal
- Arindam Chatterjee as Himanshu Ray(Zamindar of Chorabali)/Pratul Gupta
- Soma Chakraborty
- Anindyo Sengupta as Manmotho (Agnibaan)
- Dipanjan Bhattacharya Jack as Amaresh Raha
- Arijit Chowdhury
- Indrasish Roy
- Ratan Sarkhel as manager of old mess of Byomkesh and Ajit
- Ritoja Majumder
- Anindita Sarker

== Episodes ==
The episodes are listed as per they are aired.

Episode No.	Title	Part	Directed By	Original Air Date
1	Satyanweshi (সত্যান্বেষী)	1	Amit Sengupta	20 November 2014
2	Satyanweshi (সত্যান্বেষী)	2	Amit Sengupta	21 November 2014
3	Satyanweshi (সত্যান্বেষী)	3	Amit Sengupta	22 November 2014
4	Pother Kanta (পথের কাঁটা)	1	Amit Sengupta	27 November 2014
5	Pother Kanta (পথের কাঁটা)	2	Amit Sengupta	28 November 2014
6	Pother Kanta (পথের কাঁটা)	3	Amit Sengupta	29 November 2014
7	Seemanto-Heera (সীমন্ত-হীরা)	1	Amit Sengupta	4 December 2014
8	Seemanto-Heera (সীমন্ত-হীরা)	2	Amit Sengupta	5 December 2014
9	Seemanto-Heera (সীমন্ত-হীরা)	3	Amit Sengupta	6 December 2014
10	Makorshar Rosh (মাকড়সার রস)	1	Amit Sengupta	11 December 2014
11	Makorshar Rosh (মাকড়সার রস)	2	Amit Sengupta	12 December 2014
12	Makorshar Rosh (মাকড়সার রস)	3	Amit Sengupta	13 December 2014
13	Arthamanartham (অর্থমনর্থম্‌)	1	Gopal Chakraborty	18 December 2014
14	Arthamanartham (অর্থমনর্থম্‌)	2	Gopal Chakraborty	19 December 2014
15	Arthamanartham (অর্থমনর্থম্‌)	3	Gopal Chakraborty	20 December 2014
16	Arthamanartham (অর্থমনর্থম্‌)	4	Gopal Chakraborty	25 December 2014
17	Arthamanartham (অর্থমনর্থম্‌)	5	Gopal Chakraborty	26 December 2014
18	Arthamanartham (অর্থমনর্থম্‌)	6	Gopal Chakraborty	27 December 2014
19	Chorabali (চোরাবালি)	1	Gopal Chakraborty	1 January 2015
20	Chorabali (চোরাবালি)	2	Gopal Chakraborty	2 January 2015
21	Chorabali (চোরাবালি)	3	Gopal Chakraborty	3 January 2015
22	Agnibaan (অগ্নিবাণ)	1	Gopal Chakraborty	8 January 2015
23	Agnibaan (অগ্নিবাণ)	2	Gopal Chakraborty	9 January 2015
24	Agnibaan (অগ্নিবাণ)	3	Gopal Chakraborty	10 January 2015
25	Roktomukhi Neela (রক্তমুখী নীলা)	1	Gopal Chakraborty	15 January 2015
26	Roktomukhi Neela (রক্তমুখী নীলা)	2	Gopal Chakraborty	16 January 2015
27	Roktomukhi Neela (রক্তমুখী নীলা)	3	Gopal Chakraborty	17 January 2015
28	Byomkesh O Boroda (ব্যোমকেশ ও বরদা)	1	Joydeep Mukherjee	22 January 2015
29	Byomkesh O Boroda (ব্যোমকেশ ও বরদা)	2	Joydeep Mukherjee	23 January 2015
30	Byomkesh O Boroda (ব্যোমকেশ ও বরদা)	3	Joydeep Mukherjee	24 January 2015
31	Uposonghaar (উপসংহার)	1	Joydeep Mukherjee	29 January 2015
32	Uposonghaar (উপসংহার)	2	Joydeep Mukherjee	30 January 2015
33	Uposonghaar (উপসংহার)	3	Joydeep Mukherjee	31 January 2015
34	Uposonghaar (উপসংহার)	4	Joydeep Mukherjee	5 February 2015
35	Uposonghaar (উপসংহার)	5	Joydeep Mukherjee	6 February 2015
36	Uposonghaar (উপসংহার)	6	Joydeep Mukherjee	7 February 2015
37	Uposonghaar (উপসংহার)	7	Joydeep Mukherjee	12 February 2015
38	Adwitiyo (অদ্বিতীয়)	1	Gopal Chakraborty	13 February 2015
39	Adwitiyo (অদ্বিতীয়)	2	Gopal Chakraborty	14 February 2015
40	Achin Pakhi (অচিন পাখি)	1	Gopal Chakraborty	19 February 2015
41	Achin Pakhi (অচিন পাখি)	2	Gopal Chakraborty	20 February 2015
42	Achin Pakhi (অচিন পাখি)	3	Gopal Chakraborty	21 February 2015
43	Chitrochor (চিত্রচোর)	1	Gopal Chakraborty	26 February 2015
44	Chitrochor (চিত্রচোর)	2	Gopal Chakraborty	27 February 2015
45	Chitrochor (চিত্রচোর)	3	Gopal Chakraborty	28 February 2015
46	Chitrochor (চিত্রচোর)	4	Gopal Chakraborty	5 March 2015
47	Chitrochor (চিত্রচোর)	5	Gopal Chakraborty	6 March 2015
48	Chitrochor (চিত্রচোর)	6	Gopal Chakraborty	7 March 2015
49	Monimondon (মণিমন্ডন)	1	Gopal Chakraborty	12 March 2015
50	Monimondon (মণিমন্ডন)	2	Gopal Chakraborty	13 March 2015
51	Monimondon (মণিমন্ডন)	3	Gopal Chakraborty	14 March 2015
52	Banhi-Patanga (বহ্নি-পতঙ্গ)	1	Gopal Chakraborty	19 March 2015
53	Banhi-Patanga (বহ্নি-পতঙ্গ)	2	Gopal Chakraborty	20 March 2015
54	Banhi-Patanga (বহ্নি-পতঙ্গ)	3	Gopal Chakraborty	21 March 2015
55	Banhi-Patanga (বহ্নি-পতঙ্গ)	4	Gopal Chakraborty	26 March 2015
56	Banhi-Patanga (বহ্নি-পতঙ্গ)	5	Gopal Chakraborty	27 March 2015
57	Banhi-Patanga (বহ্নি-পতঙ্গ)	6	Gopal Chakraborty	28 March 2015
58	Adrishyo Trikon (অদৃশ্য ত্রিকোণ)	1	Gopal Chakraborty	2 April 2015
59	Adrishyo Trikon (অদৃশ্য ত্রিকোণ)	2	Gopal Chakraborty	3 April 2015
60	Khunji Khunji Nari (খুঁজি খুঁজি নারি)	1	Gopal Chakraborty	4 April 2015
61	Khunji Khunji Nari (খুঁজি খুঁজি নারি)	2	Gopal Chakraborty	9 April 2015
62	Dushtochokro (দুষ্টচক্র)	1	Gopal Chakraborty	10 April 2015
63	Dushtochokro (দুষ্টচক্র)	2	Gopal Chakraborty	16 April 2015
64	Durgo Rahasyo (দুর্গরহস্য)	1	Gopal Chakraborty	17 April 2015
65	Durgo Rahasyo (দুর্গরহস্য)	2	Gopal Chakraborty	18 April 2015
66	Durgo Rahasyo (দুর্গরহস্য)	3	Gopal Chakraborty	23 April 2015
67	Durgo Rahasyo (দুর্গরহস্য)	4	Gopal Chakraborty	24 April 2015
68	Durgo Rahasyo (দুর্গরহস্য)	5	Gopal Chakraborty	25 April 2015
69	Durgo Rahasyo (দুর্গরহস্য)	6	Gopal Chakraborty	30 April 2015
70	Durgo Rahasyo (দুর্গরহস্য)	7	Gopal Chakraborty	1 May 2015
71	Henyalir Chhondo (হেঁয়ালির ছন্দ)	1	Gopal Chakraborty	2 May 2015
72	Henyalir Chhondo (হেঁয়ালির ছন্দ)	2	Gopal Chakraborty	7 May 2015
73	Adim Ripu (আদিম রিপু)	1	Gopal Chakraborty	8 May 2015
74	Adim Ripu (আদিম রিপু)	2	Gopal Chakraborty	9 May 2015
75	Adim Ripu (আদিম রিপু)	3	Gopal Chakraborty	14 May 2015
76	Adim Ripu (আদিম রিপু)	4	Gopal Chakraborty	15 May 2015
77	Adim Ripu (আদিম রিপু)	5	Gopal Chakraborty	16 May 2015
78	Adim Ripu (আদিম রিপু)	6	Gopal Chakraborty	21 May 2015
79	Chholonar Chhondo (ছলনার ছন্দ)	1	Gopal Chakraborty	22 May 2015
80	Chholonar Chhondo (ছলনার ছন্দ)	2	Gopal Chakraborty	23 May 2015
81	Lohar Biscuit (লোহার বিস্কুট)	1	Gopal Chakraborty	28 May 2015
82	Lohar Biscuit (লোহার বিস্কুট)	2	Gopal Chakraborty	29 May 2015
83	Lohar Biscuit (লোহার বিস্কুট)	3	Gopal Chakraborty	30 May 2015
84	Chiriyakhana (চিড়িয়াখানা)	1	Gopal Chakraborty	4 June 2015
85	Chiriyakhana (চিড়িয়াখানা)	2	Gopal Chakraborty	5 June 2015
86	Chiriyakhana (চিড়িয়াখানা)	3	Gopal Chakraborty	6 June 2015
87	Chiriyakhana (চিড়িয়াখানা)	4	Gopal Chakraborty	11 June 2015
88	Chiriyakhana (চিড়িয়াখানা)	5	Gopal Chakraborty	12 June 2015
89	Chiriyakhana (চিড়িয়াখানা)	6	Gopal Chakraborty	13 June 2015
90	Chiriyakhana (চিড়িয়াখানা)	7	Gopal Chakraborty	18 June 2015
91	Rokter Daag (রক্তের দাগ)	1	Gopal Chakraborty	19 June 2015
92	Rokter Daag (রক্তের দাগ)	2	Gopal Chakraborty	20 June 2015
93	Rokter Daag (রক্তের দাগ)	3	Gopal Chakraborty	25 June 2015
94	Rokter Daag (রক্তের দাগ)	4	Gopal Chakraborty	26 June 2015
95	Benishonghaar (বেনীসংহার)	1	Gopal Chakraborty	27 June 2015
96	Benishonghaar (বেনীসংহার)	2	Gopal Chakraborty	2 July 2015
97	Benishonghaar (বেনীসংহার)	3	Gopal Chakraborty	3 July 2015
98	Benishonghaar (বেনীসংহার)	4	Gopal Chakraborty	4 July 2015
99	Benishonghaar (বেনীসংহার)	5	Gopal Chakraborty	9 July 2015
100	Benishonghaar (বেনীসংহার)	6	Gopal Chakraborty	10 July 2015
101	Benishonghaar (বেনীসংহার)	7	Gopal Chakraborty	11 July 2015
102	Benishonghaar (বেনীসংহার)	8	Gopal Chakraborty	16 July 2015
103	Room No 2 (রুম নম্বর দুই)	1	Gopal Chakraborty	17 July 2015
104	Room No 2 (রুম নম্বর দুই)	2	Gopal Chakraborty	18 July 2015
105	Room No 2 (রুম নম্বর দুই)	3	Gopal Chakraborty	23 July 2015
106	Room No 2 (রুম নম্বর দুই)	4	Gopal Chakraborty	24 July 2015
107	Magno Mainak (মগ্নমৈনাক)	1	Gopal Chakraborty	25 July 2015
108	Magno Mainak (মগ্নমৈনাক)	2	Gopal Chakraborty	30 July 2015
109	Magno Mainak (মগ্নমৈনাক)	3	Gopal Chakraborty	31 July 2015
110	Magno Mainak (মগ্নমৈনাক)	4	Gopal Chakraborty	1 August 2015
111	Magno Mainak (মগ্নমৈনাক)	5	Gopal Chakraborty	6 August 2015
112	Magno Mainak (মগ্নমৈনাক)	6	Gopal Chakraborty	7 August 2015
113	Magno Mainak (মগ্নমৈনাক)	7	Gopal Chakraborty	8 August 2015
114	Magno Mainak (মগ্নমৈনাক)	8	Gopal Chakraborty	13 August 2015
115	Magno Mainak (মগ্নমৈনাক)	9	Gopal Chakraborty	14 August 2015
116	Magno Mainak (মগ্নমৈনাক)	10	Gopal Chakraborty	15 August 2015
117	Magno Mainak (মগ্নমৈনাক)	11	Gopal Chakraborty	20 August 2015
118	Magno Mainak (মগ্নমৈনাক)	12	Gopal Chakraborty	21 August 2015
119	Amriter Mrityu (অমৃতের মৃত্যু)	1	Gopal Chakraborty	22 August 2015
120	Amriter Mrityu (অমৃতের মৃত্যু)	2	Gopal Chakraborty	27 August 2015
121	Amriter Mrityu (অমৃতের মৃত্যু)	3	Gopal Chakraborty	28 August 2015
122	Amriter Mrityu (অমৃতের মৃত্যু)	4	Gopal Chakraborty	29 August 2015
123	Amriter Mrityu (অমৃতের মৃত্যু)	5	Gopal Chakraborty	3 September 2015
124	Amriter Mrityu (অমৃতের মৃত্যু)	6	Gopal Chakraborty	4 September 2015
125	Shojarur Kanta (শজারুর কাঁটা)	1	Gopal Chakraborty	5 September 2015
126	Shojarur Kanta (শজারুর কাঁটা)	2	Gopal Chakraborty	10 September 2015
127	Shojarur Kanta (শজারুর কাঁটা)	3	Gopal Chakraborty	11 September 2015
128	Shojarur Kanta (শজারুর কাঁটা)	4	Gopal Chakraborty	12 September 2015
129	Shojarur Kanta (শজারুর কাঁটা)	5	Gopal Chakraborty	17 September 2015
130	Shojarur Kanta (শজারুর কাঁটা)	6	Gopal Chakraborty	18 September 2015
131	Shojarur Kanta (শজারুর কাঁটা)	7	Gopal Chakraborty	19 September 2015
132	Shojarur Kanta (শজারুর কাঁটা)	8	Gopal Chakraborty	24 September 2015
133	Shojarur Kanta (শজারুর কাঁটা)	9	Gopal Chakraborty	25 September 2015
134	Shojarur Kanta (শজারুর কাঁটা)	10	Gopal Chakraborty	26 September 2015
135	Kohen Kobi Kalidas (কহেন কবি কালিদাস)	1	Gopal Chakraborty	1 October 2015
136	Kohen Kobi Kalidas (কহেন কবি কালিদাস)	2	Gopal Chakraborty	2 October 2015
137	Kohen Kobi Kalidas (কহেন কবি কালিদাস)	3	Gopal Chakraborty	3 October 2015
138	Kohen Kobi Kalidas (কহেন কবি কালিদাস)	4	Gopal Chakraborty	8 October 2015
139	Kohen Kobi Kalidas (কহেন কবি কালিদাস)	5	Gopal Chakraborty	9 October 2015
140	Kohen Kobi Kalidas (কহেন কবি কালিদাস)	6	Gopal Chakraborty	10 October 2015
141	Kohen Kobi Kalidas (কহেন কবি কালিদাস)	7	Gopal Chakraborty	15 October 2015
142	Kohen Kobi Kalidas (কহেন কবি কালিদাস)	8	Gopal Chakraborty	16 October 2015
143	Kohen Kobi Kalidas (কহেন কবি কালিদাস)	9	Gopal Chakraborty	17 October 2015
144	Kohen Kobi Kalidas (কহেন কবি কালিদাস)	10	Gopal Chakraborty	22 October 2015
145	Bishupal Bodh (বিশুপাল বধ)	1	Gopal Chakraborty	23 October 2015
146	Bishupal Bodh (বিশুপাল বধ)	2	Gopal Chakraborty	24 October 2015
147	Bishupal Bodh (বিশুপাল বধ)	3	Gopal Chakraborty	29 October 2015
148	Bishupal Bodh (বিশুপাল বধ)	4	Gopal Chakraborty	30 October 2015
149	Bishupal Bodh (বিশুপাল বধ)	5	Gopal Chakraborty	31 October 2015
150	Shailo Rahasya (শৈল রহস্য)	1	Gopal Chakraborty	5 November 2015
151	Shailo Rahasya (শৈল রহস্য)	2	Gopal Chakraborty	6 November 2015
152	Shailo Rahasya (শৈল রহস্য)	3	Gopal Chakraborty	7 November 2015
153	Shailo Rahasya (শৈল রহস্য)	4	Gopal Chakraborty	12 November 2015
154	Shailo Rahasya (শৈল রহস্য)	5	Gopal Chakraborty	13 November 2015
155	Shailo Rahasya (শৈল রহস্য)	6	Gopal Chakraborty	14 November 2015

== Controversies ==
It has been reported that the shooting has been halted by a notification issued by the Artist Forum when they received several complaints against the production house Dag Creative Media. Complaints had been made by several artistes about non payment of dues for multiple months. The Federation of Cine Technicians and Workers of Eastern India has come out in support of the artists.

== Awards ==
- Actor Gaurav Chakrabarty won a Tele Academy Award (Best actor in a leading role) in 2014 for his role as Byomkesh Bakshi.

== See also ==
- Sharadindu Bandyopadhyay
- Byomkesh Bakshi
- Byomkesh Bakshi in other media
- Byomkesh Bakshi (1993 TV series), a Hindi language TV series based on the same character.
- Chiriyakhana
- Shajarur Kanta
- Uttam Kumar
- Rajit Kapur
- Gaurav Chakrabarty
