= @Followers =

Indian Bengali language crime and thriller web series

- Genre: Thriller, Crime
- Written by: Amlan Majumder
- Screenplay by: Amlan Majumder
- Directed by: Rajdeep Ghosh
- Starring: Sohini Guha Roy, Shantilal Mukherjee, Amlan Majumder, Indrasish Roy, Samiul Alam, Sandy Rong, Moumita Dutta
- Music by: Pranjal Das
- Country of origin: India
- Original language: Bengali
- No. of seasons: 1
- No. of episodes: 5

Production
- Cinematography: Shubhajit Roy

Original release
- Release: 21 February 2025

@Followers is a 2025 Indian Bengali language crime and thriller web series directed by Rajdeep Ghosh. Amlan Majumder is the producer and writer.

The series starring Sohini Guha Roy, Shantilal Mukherjee, Amlan Majumder, Indrasish Roy, Samiul Alam, Sandy Rong, and Moumita Dutta.

Cinematography is done by Shubhajit Roy and music is composed by Pranjal Das.

== Cast ==
- Sohini Guha Roy
- Shantilal Mukherjee
- Amlan Majumder
- Indrasish Roy
- Samiul Alam
- Sandy Rong
- Moumita Dutta
- Koyel Dhar
- Sayantani Majumder
- Santanu Ghosh
- Nandadulal Tripathi

== Episodes ==
No.	Title	Directed by	Original release date
1	"Khela Shuru"	Rajdeep Ghosh	21 February 2025
Hiya immerses herself in a new game that utilizes social media as a tool. However, what is the nature of the game?
2	"Mrityu Na Hotya?"	Rajdeep Ghosh	21 February 2025
Only one question arises following Hiya's tragic demise in this perilous realm of social media. Is it a natural death or homicide?
3	"Antardwanda"	Rajdeep Ghosh	21 February 2025
What weapon would Inspector Anukul Barman select to advance the case? Is it social media or his cognition?
4	"Sutro"	Rajdeep Ghosh	21 February 2025
A deeply disturbed individual receives a clue that links to his cognition and social media.
5	"Khela Sesh"	Rajdeep Ghosh	21 February 2025
Investigation concluded. Who will prevail in the game now? Inspector Anukul Barman or the perpetrator?
