= Vishnu Rao =

Indian cinematographer

- Born: Mumbai, Maharashtra, India
- Education: Film and Television Institute of India
- Occupation: Cinematographer
- Years active: 1998-present
- Organization: Western India Cinematographers'Association
- Parents: RM Rao (father); Ramadevi Rao (mother)

Vishnu Rao is an Indian cinematographer, best known for his work in Indian films.

== Early life ==
Vishnu Rao was born and raised in Mumbai, Maharashtra, India and was educated at St. Mary’s (ISC) school. He completed his graduation from Elphinstone college studying economics and sociology. He completed his post-graduation from the Film and Television Institute of India (FTII), Pune where he studied Motion Picture Photography.

== Career ==
After graduating from the FTII, he worked as a second unit cinematographer for the music video of the song “Vande Matharam” (1998) directed by Bharat Bala. He then worked as camera assistant on Merchant Ivory’s film, Cotton Mary (1999).

He has been working as a director of photography since the 2000s. He has shot several feature films, advertising films, numerous music videos, corporate films, documentaries and a few short films. Being a licensed scuba diver he has also shot underwater sequences for many projects as an underwater cinematographer.

His first feature film Bhootnath (2008), starring Amitabh Bachchan, Shahruk Khan and Juhi Chawla, was produced by Ravi Chopra under BR Films. Since then, he has gone on to shoot several mainstream successful Hindi feature films.

His first collaboration with Mohit Suri, Aashiqui 2 (2013) emerged as a critical and commercial success. The duo went on to collaborate for Ek Villain (2014), Hamari Adhuri Kahani (2015) and the adaptation of Chetan Bhagat’s book Half Girlfriend (2017).

He foray into OTT steaming came with the web series Sultan of Delhi (2023), directed by Milan Luthria, and produced by Disney+ Hotstar.

== Filmography ==
Year	Film	Note	Ref.
2008	Meerabai Not Out		
2008	Bhoothnath		
2010	Prince		
2013	Aashiqui 2		
2014	Ek Villain		
2015	Hamari Adhuri Kahani		
2017	Half Girlfriend	Adaptation of Chetan Bhagat’s Half Girlfriend	
2018	Bhaiaji Superhit		
2018	Dhadak		
2019	Good Newwz		
2020	Ticket To Bollywood		
2021	The Big Bull		
2023	Sultan of Delhi	Disney+Hotstar web series	
2026	Awarapan 2		
