= Aamar Aami =

2014 Bengali-language film directed by Orko Sinha

- Directed by: Orko Sinha
- Written by: Orko Sinha
- Screenplay by: Orko Sinha
- Produced by: Koustabh Das; Orko Sinha
- Starring: Indrasish Roy; Rahul Banerjee; Biswanath Basu; Arunima Ghosh; Upal Sengupta
- Cinematography: Souvik Basu
- Edited by: Pritha Chakraborty
- Music by: Raja Narayan Deb
- Distributed by: Eskay Movies
- Release date: 5 September 2014
- Running time: 96 mins
- Country: India
- Language: Bengali

Aamar Aami is 2014 Bengali film written and directed by debutant director Orko Sinha, and produced by Reel and Real Motion Pictures. Dibya Chatterjee made his debut as the executive producer of the film. The film revolves around a story of multiple wishes of our lives in the turbulent times of fast-changing city. It features Indrasish Roy, Rahul Banerjee, Biswanath Basu, Arunima Ghosh and others. The film was released on 5 September 2014.

== Plot ==
Subroto (Biswanath Basu) comes from a middle-class background, a poet by heart but he is stuck with a Life Insurance Corporation agent job to meet the basic needs and requirements of his family consisting of wife Sumita (Arunima Ghosh) and son Tutul (Ayush Das). He is philosophical yet practical, as he is aware of the fact that in today's world one cannot sustain himself or his family by writing poetry. Sumita is a housewife who once aspired to be an actress, but is now content looking after her husband Subroto and son Tutul. Anirban (Rahul Banerjee) is a successful commercial film maker who makes remakes of south-Indian films but desires to make a film out of his own story and script someday. When Sumita meets her old flame Anirban, their relationship is rekindled and Anirban helps Sumita to realise her suppressed dream of becoming an actress. Soumya (Indrasish Roy) is an aspiring young photographer, but his engineering background and lack of experience prevents him from securing the job of a still photographer in the industry. Soumya lives with his college mate Hindol (Hindol Bhattacharjee) and has a steady girlfriend Chandrima (Jhilik Bhattacharjee). Soumya finally gets a job but he had to make certain compromises to get it. The story follows a series of incidents that affects the lives of Subroto, Sumita, Anirban, Soumya and Chandrima with arising inner conflicts and dilemmas and finally discovering of true desires and inner selves.

== Cast ==
- Indrasish Roy as Soumya
- Rahul Banerjee as Anirban
- Biswanath Basu as Subroto
- Arunima Ghosh as Sumita
- Upal Sengupta as Magic man
- Jhilik Bhattacharya as Chandrima
- Hindol Bhattacharjee as Hindol
- Bhaskar Banerjee as Chandrima's father
- Kamalika Banerjee as Chandrima's mother
- Phalguni Chatterjee as Subroto's boss
- Ayush Das as Tutul
- Debleena Sen as Nikita
- Sanjay Biswas
- Rajdeep Gupta as guest appearance in the song Majhraate Pai Busy

== Soundtrack ==
The music was composed by director duo Kabir and Shiba and lyrics by Orko Sinha. The music was released on 12 August 2014.

No.	Title	Lyrics	Performer(s)	Length
1.	"Aamar Aami"	Orko Sinha	Rupankar	3:27
2.	"Majhraate Pai Busy"	Orko Sinha	Dibyendu Mukherjee	3:06
3.	"Khelaghar Badhte Legechi"	Rabindranath Tagore	Jayati Chakraborty	4:06
4.	"Onno Keu Thakbe Kachakachi"	Orko Sinha	Somlata Acharya, Anupam Roy	4:14
5.	"Chena Chena Mukh"	Orko Sinha	Rupam Islam	4:30
6.	"Tomake Harabo Je"	Orko Sinha	Kabir Chattopadhyay	3:33
7.	"Aami Prothom (Recitation)"	Orko Sinha	Biswanath Basu	1:01
