= Rang Milanti =

2011 Indian Bengali-language film

- Rang Milanti film Poster
- Directed by: Kaushik Ganguly
- Screenplay by: Kaushik Ganguly
- Produced by: Deepten Das
- Starring: Saswata Chatterjee; Gaurav Chakrabarty; Ridhima Ghosh; Churni Ganguly
- Cinematography: Gopi Bhagat
- Music by: Chandrabindoo
- Release date: 9 September 2011
- Country: India
- Language: Bengali

Rang Milanti is a 2011 Indian Bengali comedy film written and directed by Kaushik Ganguly. The film was produced Deepten Das under the banner of Deepten Films. The film stars Saswata Chatterjee, Gaurav Chakrabarty, Ridhima Ghosh and Churni Ganguly in the lead roles. It was released in the theatres on 9 September 2011.

== Plot ==
There are four boys and one girl. All are very good friends, but the girl wants to choose any one of them as a special friend who can become her life partner later. Her elder sister had a fight with her husband and left him. The girl went to her husband and asked for help. He refers her to a doctor who can help her. Dr. Anughatak. The doctor is no one but himself only in disguise. He helps by asking her to test 4 of his friends in 10 various situations how they react. Based on that she has to play a game of cards where she has to mark them. The person who gets maximum points in all 10 rounds will be the winner and she can marry that person. She agrees and shares the same with her sister. She starts playing the game but discovers at the end that if she plays an additional extra round the results are changing. She gets angry with the doctor and marries the person whom she loves most and realizes that we can not get every good virtue in same person. People differ, whatever good things we get in our beloved people, we have to be happy with it. Her sister also realizes the same and comes back to her husband.

== Cast ==
- Saswata Chatterjee as Dr. Anughatak
- Gaurav Chakrabarty as Rik
- Ridhima Ghosh as Kamolika
- Churni Ganguly as Kamalini
- Indrasish Roy as Tito
- Gourab Chatterjee as D.J.
- Tanaji Dasgupta as Laden
- Elena Kazan as Lisa
