= Ogo Bodhu Sundori (TV series) =

- Genre: Drama; Romance
- Created by: Ravi Ojha Productions
- Written by: Dialogues; Sharmila Mukherjee
- Story by: Mitali Bhattacharya; Zama Habib
- Directed by: Rakesh Kumar
- Starring: Ritabhari Chakraborty; Rajdeep Gupta; Rehaan Roy; Tulika Basu
- Opening theme: Ogo Bodhu Sundori by Subhamita Banerjee
- Composer: Kalyan Sen Barat
- Country of origin: India
- Original language: Bengali
- No. of episodes: 410

Production
- Producer: Ravi Ojha
- Running time: 22 Minutes
- Production company: Ravi Ojha Productions

Original release
- Network: Star Jalsha
- Release: 3 August 2009 – 5 December 2010

→

Ogo Bodhu Sundori (English: Hey Beautiful Bride) is an Indian soap opera directed by Rakesh Kumar and created and produced by Ravi Ojha under his banner Ravi Ojha Productions. The series stars Ritabhari Chakraborty and Rajdeep Gupta in lead roles, while Tulika Basu, Haradhan Bannerjee, Shankar Chakraborty and Bidipta Chakraborty in other pivotal roles. Apparently, Rajdeep Gupta opted out due to health issues and Rehaan Roy was cast instead of him.

The story and dialogues were penned by Mitali Bhattacharya along with Zama Habib and Sharmila Mukherjee respectively. The show premiered on Star Jalsha on television from 3 August 2009. The show ended on 5 December 2010. Later it was mistaken to be remade in Hindi as Sasural Genda Phool, while later, the makers confirmed that Sasural Genda Phool was an original series, and the Bengali and Hindi versions were written at the same time by the same makers and production house making both original shows. It was re-aired on Star Jalsha during lockdown period, due to the COVID-19 pandemic.

== Cast ==
- Ritabhari Chakraborty as Lolita Chatterjee (née Lahiri) - Main female protagonist. Ishan's wife, Jayanta & Jayeeta's Daughter, Labanya's elder sister
- Rajdeep Gupta / Rehaan Roy as Ishaan Lahiri - Main male protagonist, Alok's Son, Lolita's husband, Indra, Imon's brother
- Tulika Basu as Shailaja Lahiri, Ishan's Aunt, Indra's Mother
- Haradhan Banerjee as Hrishikesh Lahiri, Ishan's paternal grandfather, Mita's husband, Alok's father.
- Mita Chatterjee as Hemangini Lahiri, Hrishikesh's wife, Ishan's paternal grandmother, Alok's mother.
- Shankar Chakraborty as Alok Lahiri, Ishan's father
- Bidipta Chakraborty as Ishan's mother
- Sohini Sarkar as Dolon Maitra, Ishan's sister-in-law, Imon's wife, Shailaja's daughter-in-law.
- Dwaipayan Das as Imon, Dolon's Husband, Ishan's Brother.
- Rajanya Mitra as Rojoni, Indra's wife, Ishan's sister-in-law.
- Maitreyee Mitra as Radha.
- Roosha Chatterjee / Elfina Mukherjee / Tania Kar as Labanya, Jayanta's younger daughter, Lolita's Sister, Raj's love interest.
- Biswajit Ghosh as Kamal, Radha's son
- Ronnie Chakraborty as Indra, Ishan's Brother, Rojoni's husband, Shailaja's son.
- Subha Roy Chowdhury as Raj Mukerjee, Labanya's love interest.
- Goutam Dey as Jayanta Chatterjee-Lolita and Labanya's Father
- Suchishmita Chowdhury as Late Jayeeta Chatterjee- Lalita and Labanya's late mother
- Pradip Pramanik- Ishan & Lalita's friend
