= The Mine (novel) =

2012 novel by Arnab Ray

The Mine is a 2012 psychological horror novel written by popular Indian blogger Arnab Ray.

The Mine

== Reception ==
The book met mostly positive reviews. IBNLive hailed it as a "diabolically smart thriller". It said "The 282-page book is gripping from start to finish. There are not many authors exploring this genre and Ray may have started a trend". Daily News and Analysis considered the end as "tour de force of masterful plotting". Kanchan Gupta of The Pioneer felt "the weaving of stories into each other, the sequential introduction of characters, five experts who are brought in to investigate bizarre events inside the mine and who in turn confront the evil within them, is the work of a good literary craftsman". The Telegraph made a rather ambivalent review saying the book had "all the elements of a jolly horror jaunt" and it also liked the twist in the end. But felt that the idea of death in closed spaces is rather old, and "many of the incidents are fantastic, requiring a willing suspension of disbelief".
