= Cholo Potol Tuli =

2020 Indian Bengali film

- Directed by: Arindam Ganguly
- Based on: Cholo Potol Tuli by Shibram Chakraborty
- Produced by: Shanoli Majumder
- Starring: Sabyasachi Chakraborty; Kheyali Dastidar; Arindam Ganguly; Gaurav Chakrabarty
- Cinematography: Premendu Bikash Chaki; Tuban
- Music by: Arindam Ganguly
- Production company: Pastel Entertainment
- Release date: 21 October 2020
- Country: India
- Language: Bengali

Cholo Potol Tuli is a 2020 Indian Bengali comedy drama film directed by Arindam Ganguly and produced by Shanoli Majumder. This film was released on 21 October 2020 under the banner of Pastel Entertainment. The film, inspired by a popular Bengali stage play, staged more than 250 times which is based on eponymous story of Shibram Chakraborty, Ashwathama Hato Iti.

== Plot ==
Ashwini Chakladar, a crazy person thinks that he may be affected by BeriBeri disease through his neighbour. As a protective measure he eats banana peels regularly. Chakladar gets paranoid and makes trouble in his family that leads to comical situations.

== Cast ==
- Sabyasachi Chakrabarty as Ashwini
- Kheyali Dastidar as Jagottarini
- Arindam Ganguly as Doctor
- Gaurav Chakrabarty as Mainak
- Debshankar Haldar
- Aparajita Adhya
- Paran Bandyopadhyay
- Biswanath Basu
- Kanchan Mullick
- Subhasish Mukherjee
- Kharaj Mukherjee as Binod
- Sanjoy Sarkar
