= Ek Vivah Aisa Bhi (TV series) =

- Genre: Soap opera
- Created by: Nivedita Basu
- Based on: Marriage Under Unusual Circumstances
- Written by: Nivedita Basu, Harsha Jagdish, Soham Abhiram, Reena Pareek
- Starring: See Below
- Country of origin: India
- Original language: Hindi
- No. of seasons: 1
- No. of episodes: 164

Production
- Producer: Nivedita Basu
- Production locations: Mumbai, India
- Camera setup: Multi-camera
- Running time: Approx 21 Minutes
- Production company: The House of Originals

Original release
- Network: &TV
- Release: 6 February – 22 September 2017

Ek Vivah Aisa Bhi is an Indian Hindi romance television series, which premiered on 6 February 2017 on &TV. The series is produced by The House of Originals of Nivedita Basu. The show was replaced by Half Marriage after the last episode aired on 22 September 2017.

== Plot ==
The story revolves around the young widow Suman. Suman is a caring mother, a responsible daughter-in-law and a loving sister-in-law. She balances between the household chores and her work in a local parlour every day to keep her family financially stable. She then joins a university to pursue an MBA on her mother-in-law's insistence. There she meets the carefree Ranveer Mittal. Though they dislike each other initially, Ranveer later falls for Suman. Meanwhile, Antara's and Sanjana's (Suman's sister in laws) marriage gets fixed to the two brothers of Ranveer. Suman's mother-in-law accepts Ranveer's alliance to secure the future of her daughters. Suman, initially hesitant, later accepts Ranveer. Suman and Ranveer get married with Suman's son Veer tying the "gat-bandhan".

There is a change in the behavior of Ranveer Mittal who becomes arrogant and refuses to accept Veer. Veer is thus kept back at his paternal home with his grandmother. It is later revealed that Suman's ex-husband, Ravi Parmar, who was assumed dead, is actually alive. Suman and Veer are both forced to move in with him.

Ravi begins to physically abuse Suman. Ranveer arrives in time and saves Suman. Suman, Veer and Ranveer reconcile.

In the last scene it is shown that the whole family, including the pregnant daughters-in-laws( Suman, Sanjana and Antara), gather for a family photo.

== Cast ==
=== Main ===
- Sonali Nikam as Suman Ranveer Mittal, Ranveer's wife Veer's mother, Akash and Sindooraaa's daughter-in-law
- Abhishek Malik as Ranveer Akash Mittal, Suman's husband, Veer's father

=== Recurring ===
- Pallas Prajapati as Veer Parmar Mittal, Suman and Ravi's son, Ranveer's adoptive son; Sindooraaa and Akash's adopted grandson
- Tasneem Sheikh as Sindooraaa Akash Mittal, Ranveer's mother, Suman's mother-in-law
- Rushil Bangia as Akash Mittal, Ranveer's father, Suman's father-in-law
- Himani Shivpuri as Kalavati Parmar, Ravi's mother, Suman's ex mother-in-law
- Latika Gill as Antara Mittal, Manan's wife, Ravi's sister, Brijesh and Nupur's elder daughter in law
- Kushagre Dua as Manan Brijesh Mittal, Ranveer's cousin brother, Antara's husband
- Sneha Gupta as Sanjana Mittal, Sahil's wife, Ravi's sister, Brijesh and Nupur's younger daughter in law
- Rupin Pahwa / Rehaan Roy as Sahil Brijesh Mittal, Ranveer's cousin brother, Sanjana's husband'
- Shefali Rana as Nupur Brijesh Mittal, Sahil and Manan's mother, Ranveer's aunt, Sanjana and Antara's mother in law
- Nikhhil R Khera as Brijesh Mittal, Sahil and Manan's father, Ranveer's uncle, Sanjana and Antara's father-in-law
- Suneel Pushkarna as Devraj Mittal, Ranveer's uncle
- Annapurna B Bhairi as Suhasini Devraj Mittal, Devraj's wife
- Waseem Mushtaq as Ravi Parmar, Suman's first husband, Veer's father
- Shritama Mukherjee as Sonali, Ranveer's childhood friend and former love interest
