= Mahabharat Murders =

Bengali web series

- Genre: Thriller
- Based on: The Mahabharata Murders by Arnab Ray
- Screenplay by: Anirban Bhattacharya; Sougata Basu
- Directed by: Soumik Halder
- Starring: Priyanka Sarkar; Arjun Chakrabarty; Saswata Chatterjee; Rajdeep Gupta; Debasish Mondal; Rishav Basu; Koushik Sen
- Music by: Amit-Ishan
- Country of origin: India
- Original language: Bengali
- No. of seasons: 1
- No. of episodes: 12

Production
- Cinematography: Ramyadip Saha
- Editor: Sanglap Bhowmik
- Running time: 17-25 minutes
- Production company: SVF Entertainment

Original release
- Release: 13 May – 3 June 2022

Mahabharat Murders is a Bengali thriller series streaming on Hoichoi from 13 May 2022, based on the book The Mahabharata Murders by Arnab Ray. The series is directed by Soumik Halder and stars Priyanka Sarkar, Arjun Chakrabarty, Saswata Chatterjee, Kaushik Sen, Rajdeep Gupta.

== Plot ==
The story happens in Kolkata and follows a serial killer who considers himself as modern-day Duryodhana and takes a dramatic spin over the Mahabharata’s narrative.

== Cast ==
- Priyanka Sarkar as Ruksana Ahmed, I.P.S., an investigating officer at Kolkata Police detective department
- Arjun Chakrabarty as Siddhanth Singha, Ruksana's side-kick
- Saswata Chatterjee as Pabitra Chatterjee, a politician
- Kaushik Sen as Abirlal, Pabitra's advisor
- Shankar Debnath as Laltu Mama
- Rajdeep Gupta as Prakash Sharma, CEO of Ycon Consultancy
- Rishav Basu as Vicky Patel
- Arna Mukhopadhyay as Dr. Bipul Bannerjee
- Debasish Mondal as Javed, Ruksana's estranged partner
- Sudip Mukherjee as Surojit Mukherjee, Police Commissioner at Kolkata Police and Ruksana's senior
- Satyam Bhattacharya as Joy, a cyber specialist at Kolkata Police detective department and an Indian classical music enthusiast
- Arpita Ghosh as Devika Lahiri
- Riyaa Ganguly as Tania, Devika's flatmate
- Aparajita Ghosh as Kanika Basu, Director at YCon and Prakash's ex
- Jammy Bannerjee as Shamsuddin
- Bihaan Saha Dalal as Salim, Ruksana’s son

== Season 1 ==
This season will take the viewers on a mysterious and suspenseful trip based on Arnab Ray’s novel ‘Mahabharat Murders’, the series was released on 13 May 2022. hoichoi will release three episodes every week till June 3. This season was directed by Soumik Haldar.
