= Sultan of Delhi (TV series) =

Indian action thriller series

- Genre: Action thriller
- Created by: Milan Luthria
- Based on: Sultan of Delhi: Ascension by Arnab Ray
- Written by: Karan Vyas (Dialogue)
- Screenplay by: Suparn Verma
- Story by: Suparn Verma
- Directed by: Milan Luthria; Suparn Verma
- Starring: Tahir Raj Bhasin; Mouni Roy
- Composers: Sangeet-Siddharth; Amaal Mallik; Anu Malik
- Country of origin: India
- Original language: Hindi
- No. of seasons: 1
- No. of episodes: 9

Production
- Executive producers: Gaurav Banerjee; Avani Saxena
- Producers: Namit Sharma; Richard de Varda
- Cinematography: Vishnu Rao
- Editor: Rajesh G. Pandey
- Camera setup: Multi-camera
- Running time: 30- 45 minutes
- Production companies: Reliance Entertainment; Dreamers & Doers

Original release
- Network: Disney+ Hotstar
- Release: 13 October 2023

Sultan of Delhi (transl. King of Delhi) is an Indian Hindi-language period crime thriller television series written by Suparn Verma and directed by Milan Luthria and produced by Namit Sharma under the banner of Reliance Entertainment. The series is set in Delhi in the year 1962 and is based on writer Arnab Ray's book Sultan of Delhi: Ascension, and stars an ensemble cast including Tahir Raj Bhasin, Mouni Roy, Anjum Sharma, Vinay Pathak, Anupriya Goenka, Nishant Dahiya, Mehreen Pirzada and Harleen Sethi. It premiered on Disney+ Hotstar on 13 October 2023.

== Plot ==
The story of Arjun Bhatia, a teenage immigrant from Lahore who works with Delhi's top illicit arms dealer Jagan Seth, is told in the 2023 TV mini-series Sultan of Delhi. The series is based on Arnab Ray's novel Sultan of Delhi: Ascension. The story follows the ascension of a mobster in 1960s Delhi. Arjun is a 1947 Partition survivor who witnessed his family's slaughter. He makes it through the night with his father and arrives at Delhi. The show opens with a gathering of a half-dozen elderly men who oversee the city's underbelly. Farooq Mastaan (Anil George) calls the conference to order and tells the gang leaders to work together. He designates Arjun as the foremost among equals, the guy who will henceforth make the decisions. The series delves into a story of greed, treachery, bravery, and the ultimate struggle for dominance.

== Cast ==
- Tahir Raj Bhasin as Arjun Mohindar Bhatia
- Mouni Roy as Nayantara Gangopadhyay
- Mehreen Pirzada as Sanjana Ranawat
- Anjum Sharma as Nilendu Bangopodhya a.k.a. Bangaali
- Vinay Pathak as Jagan Lukman Seth
- Anupriya Goenka as Shankari Devi a.k.a. Chandini
- Nishant Dahiya as Rajender Pratap Singh a.k.a. RP, son of 'JP' Jewender Partap Singh
- Shadab Kamal as Vaikunth
- Harleen Sethi as Preeti Ganmukh patel
- Sunil Kumar as Ganmukh Madan Patel, Preeti's father
- Anil George as Farooq Mastaan, an underworld Don
- Gulshan Pandey as Mr. Tejwani
- Sunil Palwal as Bhope Sandhu, henchman of Seth Jagan

== Episodes ==
No. overall	No. in season	Title	Directed by	Written by	Original release date
1	1	"The Scar"	Milan Luthria; Suparn Verma	Suparn Verma; Karan Vyas	13 October 2023
1	2	"Sweet Smell of Success"	Milan Luthria; Suparn Verma	Suparn Verma; Karan Vyas	13 October 2023
1	3	"Kiss of Love"	Milan Luthria; Suparn Verma	Suparn Verma; Karan Vyas	13 October 2023
1	4	"Bombay Confidential"	Milan Luthria; Suparn Verma	Suparn Verma; Karan Vyas	13 October 2023
1	5	"Return of the Game"	Milan Luthria; Suparn Verma	Suparn Verma; Karan Vyas	13 October 2023
1	6	"Nights in White Satin"	Milan Luthria; Suparn Verma	Suparn Verma; Karan Vyas	13 October 2023
1	7	"The Crown"	Milan Luthria; Suparn Verma	Suparn Verma; Karan Vyas	13 October 2023
1	8	"Fued"	Milan Luthria; Suparn Verma	Suparn Verma; Karan Vyas	13 October 2023
1	9	"Till Death Do Us Part"	Milan Luthria; Suparn Verma	Suparn Verma; Karan Vyas	13 October 2023

== Production ==
The series was announced on Disney+ Hotstar by Reliance Entertainment, consisting of nine episodes. It is based on Arnab Ray's Sultan of Delhi: Ascension (2016). Initially, Neha Sharma was approached to play the female lead. Later, Tahir Raj Bhasin and Mouni Roy were signed as the lead. The launch event for the series was held on 22 September 2023.

== Music ==
No.	Title	Lyrics	Music	Singer(s)	Length
1.	"Tra La La"	Kumaar	Anu Malik	Anmol Malik	3:44
2.	"Saaqiya"	Milan Luthria	Sangeet-Siddharth	Javed Ali	3:45
3.	"Tujh Pe Dil Haar Ke"	Kunaal Vermaa	Amaal Mallik	Armaan Malik, Shreya Ghoshal	3:24
4.	"Sultan Of Delhi - Theme"	-	Daniel B.George	-	2:38
5.	"Tujh Pe Dil Haar Ke - (Armaan Malik Version)"	Kunaal Vermaa	Amaal Mallik	Armaan Malik	3:24
6.	"Tuje Pe Dil Haar Ke (Lofi Mix)"	Kunaal Vermaa	Amaal Mallik	Shreya Ghoshal	3:20
Total length:					20:16

== Release ==
The series was released on 13 October 2023 on OTT platform Disney+ Hotstar.

== Critical reception ==
Saibal Chatterjee of NDTV rated the series 1.5 out of 5 stars and wrote "Pulp fiction paraded as a chronicle of a time of immense import, Sultan of Delhi is a rather desultory adaptation of a passable book that has an undeniable sense of history."

Deepa Gahlot for Rediff.com stated "Characters pop in without explanation, like a mysterious white man, Daniel, who wears a pilot's uniform all the time (the costume budget must have run out with Shankari's outfits), and there are bizarre scenes, like Arjun stripping to impress a rival gangster." and rated the series 2.5 stars.

Scroll.in stated "The show likes its racy moments – a distraction from the escalating tedium, perhaps?"

== See also ==
- List of Disney+ Hotstar original programming
