= Mayaa =

- Directed by: Raajhorshee De
- Written by: Raajhorshee De; Ebong Ipsita
- Based on: Macbeth by William Shakespeare
- Produced by: Debdas Banarjee; Rohit Banarjee
- Starring: Rafiath Rashid Mithila; Tanushree Chakraborty; Reecha Sharma; Koneenica Banerjee; Rahul Banerjee; Gaurav Chakraborty; Sudipta Chakraborty
- Cinematography: Indranath Marik
- Edited by: Swarnava Chakraborty
- Music by: Ranajoy Bhattacharjee
- Production company: DSR Entertainment House
- Release date: 7 July 2023
- Country: India
- Language: Bengali

Mayaa is a 2023 Indian Bengali language thriller drama film written and directed by Raajhorshee De. The film produced by Debdas Banarjee and Rohit Banarjee under the banner of DSR Entertainment House. It's a Bengali adaptation of play Macbeth by William Shakespeare. The film stars Rafiath Rashid Mithila, Tanushree Chakraborty, Reecha Sharma, Koneenica Banerjee, Rahul Banerjee, Gaurav Chakraborty and Sudipta Chakraborty in the lead roles. The film was theatrical released on 7 July 2023.

== Cast ==
- Rafiath Rashid Mithila
- Tanushree Chakraborty
- Reecha Sharma
- Koneenica Banerjee
- Rahul Banerjee
- Gaurav Chakraborty
- Sudipta Chakraborty
