= Adda (2019 film) =

Indian Bengali-language film

- Adda Poster
- Directed by: Devayush Chowdhary
- Written by: Devayush Chowdhary
- Produced by: Maxim Pictures, Reeldrama Productions
- Starring: Soumitra Chatterjee; Sabyasachi Chakraborty; Saayoni Ghosh; Indrasish Roy; Saurav Das; Dipangshu Acharya
- Cinematography: Roopesh Shaji
- Edited by: Saikat Sekhareshwar Ray
- Music by: Joydeep Banerji, Suvam Moitra
- Release date: September 13, 2019
- Running time: 110 minutes
- Country: India
- Language: Bengali

Adda (English: Gossip) is the first feature film by filmmaker Devayush Chowdhary. It has been produced by Maxim Pictures and Reeldrama Productions and released in India on 13 September 2019.

== Plot ==
Adda is a modern-day fable of four interconnected tales of love, friendship, karma, and catharsis. The film is about two naughty angels, Black and White, who come down to Kolkata to spy on the lives of four jobless friends, an aging freedom fighter, a struggling actress, and a self-righteous journalist in order to decide humanity's fate and in the process become witnesses to bumbling attempts at happiness.

== Cast ==
- Soumitra Chatterjee as Dhritimaan Panja, an aging college professor.
- Sabyasachi Chakraborty as White, the angel of light.
- Dipangshu Acharya as Black, the angel of darkness.
- Saayoni Ghosh as Tanya, a struggling actress.
- Indrasish Roy as Rudro, a successful banker.
- Saurav Das as Satyajit, an NRI filmmaker.
- Ritwika Pal
- Deboprosad Haldar
- Prantik Banerjee
- Jit Das
- Swarnab Banerjee
- Anamika Chakraborty
- Dipanwita Nath
- Sanghasree Sinha
- Nilankur Mukkhopadhyay

== Reception ==
Adda opened to generally positive reviews but a tepid response at the box office owing to a lack of big commercial stars and huge publicity. However, the film soon caught on through word of mouth. Renowned film critic Shoma Chatterji of The Statesman (India) called the film "An accomplished debut".

The film drew both appreciation and criticism for its stylistic approach which included shaky camera movements, long monologues, and incomplete narrative threads which are all uncommon in Bengali Cinema. The Times of India said it was "not a bad film" and gave it 2.5 stars.

== Production ==
The film was originally conceived as a found footage film while the director was still a student at NYU's Tisch School of the Arts. The director Devayush Chowdhary originally conceived the film in 2011 and it took him seven years to write the screenplay. In an interview, he mentioned that because the titular characters Black and White speak in a rhyming tongue of their own, writing rhymes in Bengali was the toughest part for him. By his own admission, the film is inspired by several Hollywood and Bollywood indie films, key amongst them Jim Jarmusch's Coffee and Cigarettes and Kiran Rao's Dhobi Ghat.
