= Randhane Bandhan =

Indian Cooking Game Show

- Official poster of Randhane Bandhan
- Genre: Cooking Game Show
- Written by: Anomitra Chatterjee
- Directed by: Ronjit Roy
- Presented by: Ridhima Ghosh; Gaurav Chakrabarty
- Theme music composer: Indradeep Dasgupta
- Opening theme: O Randhaner Bandhane by Ikkshita Mukherjee
- Country of origin: India
- Original language: Bengali
- No. of seasons: 1
- No. of episodes: 114

Production
- Executive producer: Sudipta Sarkar
- Camera setup: Uttam Puglia
- Running time: 23 minutes

Original release
- Network: Zee Bangla
- Release: 20 May – 28 September 2024

Randhane Bandhan is an Indian Bengali cooking game show which airs on Zee Bangla from 20 May 2024. The show is hosted by Ridhima Ghosh & Gaurav Chakrabarty.

== Format ==
Each episode will have two pairs who are related to each other. The two pairs of each episode will be given a hero ingredient, which they have to use in their recipe and present the dish within a certain time. Whoever makes the better dish goes to the next round. They will be judged by guest judges. The winner of the first episode and the winner of the second episode will play each other in the third episode and the winner of every third episode will become Sherar Shera.
