= Karam (2005 film) =

2005 Indian film by Sanjay F. Gupta

- Theatrical release poster
- Directed by: Sanjay F. Gupta
- Screenplay by: Suparn Verma
- Story by: Suparn Verma
- Produced by: Pammi Baweja
- Starring: John Abraham; Priyanka Chopra; Bharat Dabholkar
- Cinematography: Narendra Khanna
- Edited by: Merzin Tavaria
- Music by: Songs: Vishal–Shekhar; Pankaj Awasthi; Score; Amar Mohile
- Distributed by: Baweja Movies
- Release date: 11 March 2005
- Running time: 117 minutes
- Country: India
- Language: Hindi
- Budget: ₹5.75 crore
- Box office: ₹7.76 crore

Karam (transl.Blessing) is a 2005 Indian Hindi-language action thriller film directed by cinematographer Sanjay F. Gupta, in his directorial debut. Starring John Abraham, Priyanka Chopra and Bharat Dabholkar, the film follows John Wargas, a professional assassin who ends up unintentionally killing an innocent family during a mission and becomes traumatized, eventually tendering his resignation. This does not go down well with his boss, who kidnaps John's wife and holds her hostage. In order to win back her freedom, John must complete one last job: killing some of the city's top men within a limited period of time. The film co-stars Vishwajeet Pradhan, Shiney Ahuja, Murli Sharma, Rajesh Khera and Aanjjan Srivastav.

Having directed several music videos, Gupta decided to direct the film after being impressed with the script written by Suparn Verma. Confirming that it was not inspired by any Hong Kong film, Gupta decided to do his own take on it despite feeling the script was not novel. With a strong feeling that John Abraham suited the role from the beginning, Gupta cast him as the lead alongside Priyanka Chopra, and named the protagonist after Abraham. Producer Harry Baweja revealed the film was based on a true story and shot entirely in Mumbai.

Karam was released theatrically on 11 March 2005, opening to mixed reviews from critics and audiences. It was a commercial failure both domestically and overseas. In 2011 during an interview for his film Force, John Abraham revealed a number of people came up and told him Karam was their favorite film.

== Plot ==
The film begins with Shalini Wargas narrating how much she loved John Wargas despite knowing he was a contract killer and how things might have been different had he not picked up a gun. The film goes into flashback mode, and John Wargas is shown to be an assassin working for a mobster named Captain. Accompanied by two friends Kaif and Bull, he is assigned a hit, which he carries out, but also ends up killing an entire family, who arrives untimely to the house from where the hit was planned. Apart from the adults, one of their daughters gets shot unintentionally by John. He gets traumatized, and despite his friends telling him to move on, he becomes guilt-ridden and explains everything to Shalini, with whom he plans to escape away. The city's toughest cop, Wagh, starts investigating the murder and, in the process, comes close to the surviving daughter of the deceased family.

Meanwhile, Captain is attacked by the rival don, Yunus, and as a result decides to teach the city a lesson by killing the city's top industrialist, top film producer, the cop backing Yunus and Yunus himself; so that everyone else falls in line and no one dreams of becoming another Yunus. He decides that John must carry out this plan of his. To achieve this, he takes Shalini hostage. John is given 36 hours to kill the five targets on the hit list. John re-unites with his friends but struggles to carry out the hits initially due to still being traumatized. He, however, manages to kill the targets one by one, while his wife tries to escape in order to stop him from killing. Kaif, however, gets killed by Wagh after John manages to kill a few more targets. Shalini slashes her wrist and is admitted to a hospital, where she realizes she's pregnant and manages to escape. She manages to contact John, who arrives to pick her up, only to find himself trapped when she gets taken hostage once again. Realizing that he has been double-crossed, John shoots Bull in front of Captain, who reminds him of the remaining time he has.

John meets Wagh and asks for his help in exchange for providing all evidence against Captain, to which Wagh agrees. Along with sub-inspector Naik, he arrives on the spot and, after a gunfight, manages to free Shalini. John, on the other hand, meets Yunus and his friend, DCP Patil. He blackmails Patil into bringing him Shalini, which he does. However, John kills both Yunus and Patil, escaping with Shalini. A chase ensues, resulting in a rough fight between John and Captain. John manages to kill Captain and his team, but when one of his surviving members tries to shoot, John shoots him, and himself gets shot unintentionally by Naik, the same way John mistakenly shot the young girl. He breathes his last near Shalini, who gets shattered by his death.

The film ends with the story returning to the present time, where Shalini is happily playing with two kids: her son and the daughter of the family John killed, whom she adopted.

== Cast ==
- John Abraham as John Wargas
- Priyanka Chopra as Shalini Wargas, John's wife
- Bharat Dabholkar as Captain
- Vishwajeet Pradhan as Yunus
- Shiney Ahuja as ACP Wagh
- Murli Sharma as Kaif
- Rajesh Khera as Bull
- Aanjjan Srivastav as DCP Patil
- Nitin Arora
- Bikramjeet Kanwarpal
- Sohail Khan

== Soundtrack ==
Karam

Soundtrack album by Vishal–Shekhar
- Released: 11 February 2005
- Genre: Feature film soundtrack
- Label: T-Series
- Producer: Vishal–Shekhar

Vishal–Shekhar chronology
Shabd (2005)	Karam (2005)	Home Delivery (2005)

The music was composed by Vishal–Shekhar and Pankaj Awasthi. The lyrics were penned by Vishal Dadlani, Irshad Kamil, Dev Kohli, Pankaj Awasthi, Amit Mishra and Harshdeep. The title song of this movie "Tera Hi Karam" was sung by Pankaj Awasthi in a unique Sufi style and the song "Tinka Tinka" were appreciated by the critics.

=== Track listing ===
No.	Title	Lyrics	Music	Singer(s)	Length
1.	"Ishq Nachaya Kare"	Vishal Dadlani	Vishal–Shekhar	Sunidhi Chauhan
2.	"Koi Aisa Alam"	Dev Kohli	Vishal–Shekhar	Sonu Nigam, Mahalakshmi Iyer
3.	"Le Jaa"	Pankaj Awasthi, Amit Mishra	Balkrishna Sharma	Harshdeep, Vishal Dadlani
4.	"Tera Hi Karam"	Pankaj Awasthi	Pankaj Awasthi	Pankaj Awasthi
5.	"Tinka Tinka"	Irshad Kamil	Vishal–Shekhar	Alisha Chinai
6.	"Ishq Nachaya Kare" (Instrumental)		Vishal–Shekhar
7.	"Tinka Tinka" (Instrumental)		Vishal–Shekhar
