= Adwitiya =

Indian Bengali drama TV serial

- Genre: Drama; Romance; Thriller
- Created by: Ideas Creations
- Story by: Anuja Chatterjee; Dialogues; Koushik Bhattacharya
- Directed by: Joydeep Mukherjee
- Starring: Indrasish Roy; Sohini Sarkar; Gaurav Chakrabarty; Aparajita Adhya
- Country of origin: India
- Original language: Bengali
- No. of seasons: 1
- No. of episodes: 208

Production
- Producers: Prosenjit Chatterjee; Arpita Chatterjee
- Running time: approximately 21 minutes
- Production company: Ideas Creations

Original release
- Network: Star Jalsa
- Release: 13 June 2011 – 2 March 2012

Adwitiya is a Bengali television series that aired from 13 June 2011 to 2 March 2012 on Star Jalsha channel. It was produced by Ideas Creations and the concept was initialized by Prosenjit Chatterjee. The show was directed by Joydeep Mukherjee and the script was jointly written by Anuja Chattopadhyay and Kaushik Bhattacharya. The series was shot on the backdrop of Sunderbans. It stars Bengali actors Indrasish Roy, Sohini Sarkar and Gaurav Chakraborty. It won awards for Best Villain and Best Couple at Star Jalsha Paribar awards in 2012.

== Storyline ==
Adwitiya revolves around a young girl who is a student of medical science. Due to the sudden demise of Adwitiya's father she has to forgo her studies to take up a job in a rural bank in the districts of Sunderban at Komoltoli. Komoltoli is a village headed and manipulated by the Chowdhury brothers, namely Rabikiran Chowdhury and Chandrakiran Chowdhury. While all seems fine from outside in the village, but inside, there goes a series of political and malicious activities controlled by the Chowdhury brothers. The people of the village are victimized by these practices but no-one fears to voice against the brothers of the Chowdhury family. Adwitiya enters the village and takes up the cudgels of putting the village on the path of progress, while discovering and untangling many puzzles lying beneath the darkness of Komoltoli.

== Cast ==
- Sohini Sarkar as Adwitiya Sen / Mumu
- Indrasish Roy as Chandrakiran Chowdhury / Chaand
- Gaurav Chakraborty as Rabikiran Chowdhury / Robi
- Aparajita Adhya as Monimala / Monima
- Mithu Chakraborty as Anuradha Sen: Adwitiya's mother
- Surojit Banerjee as Adrish Sen: Adwitiya's father
- Vivaan Ghosh as Bihaan
- Disha Ganguly as Bulbuli
- Joydeep Mukherjee as Shovan / Daktar Babu
- Anindita Bose as Indira Chowdhury / Ratri Mukherjee
- Nabanita Mukherjee Das as Sukhalata / Sukhi
- Animesh Bhaduri as Master Moshai
- Mrinal Banerjee as Bhiringi
