= Ami Aadu =

- Film poster
- Directed by: Somnath Gupta
- Produced by: New Theatres
- Starring: See below
- Cinematography: Soumik Haldar
- Edited by: Arghyakamal Mitra
- Production company: New Theatres
- Release date: 25 February 2011 (Kolkata)
- Running time: 117 minutes
- Country: India
- Language: Bengali

Ami Aadu, formerly titled Aadur Prem, is a 2011 Bengali film produced by New Theatres and directed by Somnath Gupta. In this film the protagonist, Aadu, a poor Bengali village girl from Murshidabad, writes a letter to U.S. President George W. Bush informing him about the hardships in her life caused by the 2003 invasion of Iraq.

This was Gupta's debut film as a director. Actress Deblina Chatterjee, who played the title role, made her cinematic acting debut with this film as well. The film received National Film Award for Best Feature Film in Bengali in 2010.

== Plot ==
It is the early 2000s; George W. Bush is the President of the United States and Saddam Hussein is the President of Iraq. Meanwhile, Aadu, a young poor Hindu girl living in a village in Murshidabad, India, falls in love with Suleman, a Muslim garment supplier who lives in the nearby village of Amodiya. Suleman dreams of learning English and becoming a fluent speaker, so he can go overseas and find a job. Though Aadu and Suelman follow different religions, their families allow them to marry, and the marriage goes off smoothly.

The impoverished Suleman decides to head to Iraq with his friend Jabbar in search of a good job, leaving his new wife Aadu in the village. Then, in March 2003, the United States invades Iraq. Because of the war and the resulting political turmoil, all communication links between Aadu's village and Iraq are cut off. Aadu and the villagers gradually learn news about the bombings and destruction in Iraq and are horrified. The helpless Aadu decides to write a letter to U.S. President George W. Bush, whom she heard was "all powerful", informing him about the troubles in her life caused by the Iraq War.

== Cast ==
- Deblina Chatterjee as Aadu
- Samadarshi Dutta as Suleman
- Bidipta Chakraborty
- Rudranil Ghosh as Jabbar
- Ena Saha as Amina
- Mithu Chakraborty
- Pradip Mukherjee
- Biplab Chatterjee as Mainuddin
- Angana Basu
- Soumitra Chatterjee
- Pradip Mukherjee

== Release and reception ==
Professional reviews
Review Scores
Source	Rating
The Indian Express	4/5 stars
The Times of India	3.5/5 stars

The film was released on 25 February 2011 and got positive reviews from critics. The Indian Express gave it four stars and in The Times of India critic's rating the film got three and a half starts out of five stars. Acting of both Deblina Chatterjee as Aadu and Samdardhi Dutta as Suleman were critically appreciated. The Indian Express wrote in their review, Debalina Chatterjee's as Aadu was "mind-blowing" in the film. Soumik Halder's cinematography, specially the shots of rural Bengal and editing of Arghyakamal Mitra were appreciated too.

== See also ==
- My Name Is Khan, a 2010 Indian film with similar undertones
