= Suparn Verma =

Indian director and filmmaker

Suparn Varma
- Born: 24 September 1974 (age 51); Mumbai, Maharashtra, India
- Occupations: Director; screenwriter; producer
- Years active: 1999–present

Suparn Varma (born 24 September 1974) is an Indian film director, screenwriter, producer who works in Hindi cinema. He is best known for directing television shows such as The Family Man (2021), Rana Naidu (2023) and The Trial (2023).

== Career ==
Varma started his career as a journalist and. In 2005 he made his debut as a director with the film Ek Khiladi Ek Haseena. Then in 2009 he has directed Acid Factory, which didn't do well in the box office. And then in 2013 he made his directorial comeback with his third film Aatma.

== Filmography ==
=== Films ===
Year	Title	Director	Writer	Producer	Notes	Ref.
2002	Chhal	No	Yes	No		
2002	Yeh Kya Ho Raha Hai?	No	Yes	No		
2003	Zameen	No	Yes	No		
2003	Janasheen	No	Yes	No		
2003	Qayamat: City Under Threat	No	Yes	No		
2005	Karam	No	Yes	No		
2005	Ek Khiladi Ek Haseena	Yes	Yes	No	Remake of Confidence	
2008	Love Story 2050	No	Yes	No		
2008	Ugly Aur Pagli	No	Yes	No		
2009	Acid Factory	Yes	Yes	No	Remake of Unknown	
2013	Aatma	Yes	Yes	No		
2015	X: Past Is Present	Yes	No	No		
2023	Sirf Ek Bandaa Kaafi Hai	No	No	Yes	Released on ZEE5	
2025	Haq	Yes	No	No	based on Mohd. Ahmed Khan v. Shah Bano Begum case	

=== Web series ===
Year	Title	Director	Writer	Platform	Notes	Ref
2017	Yeh Ke Hua Bro	Yes	Yes	Voot		
2018	Kaushiki	Yes	Yes	Viu		
2020	Hasmukh	No	Yes	Netflix		
2021	His Storyy	No	Yes	ALTBalaji		
2021	Puncch Beat	No	Yes	ALTBalaji		
2021	Mai Hero Bol Raha Hu	No	Yes	ALTBalaji		
2021	The Family Man	Yes	Yes	Amazon Prime Video	Directed 5 episodes in Season 2	
2023	Rana Naidu	Yes	No	Netflix	Co-directed with Karan Anshuman	
2023	The Trial	Yes	No	Disney Plus Hotstar		
2023	Sultan of Delhi	Yes	Yes	Disney Plus Hotstar	Co-directed with Milan Luthria	
2024	Lootere	No	Yes	Disney Plus Hotstar		
