= Smaranjit Chakraborty =

Bengali author and screenwriter

- স্মরনজিৎ চক্রবর্ত্তী
- Born: 19 June 1976 (age 50); Batanagar, Calcutta, West Bengal, India
- Occupations: Author, Poet, Businessman
- Writing career
- Language: Bengali
- Genre: Fiction
- Subject: Literature

Smaranjit Chakraborty (Bengali: স্মরনজিৎ চক্রবর্ত্তী) is a Bengali author and screenwriter. He received Ananda Puraskar in 2025.

== Bibliography ==
Adamya Sen Series (Detective Series):

- 1) Adamya (2015)
- 2) Adamya 2 (2016)
- 3) Adamya 3 (2019)

Full-Length Novels:

- 1) Patajharar Marshume (2007)
- 2) Amader Sei Shahare (2009)
- 3) Etuku Bristi (2011)
- 4) Finge (2012)
- 5) Pakhider Sahare Jeman (2012)
- 6) Britta(2013)
- 7) Budbud (2013)
- 8) Alor Gandha (2013)
- 9) Furaye Sudhu Chokhe (2014)
- 10) Palta Hawa (2014)
- 11) Criss-cross (2014)
- 12) Omm(2015)
- 13) Mom-Kagaj (2016)
- 14) Doyel Sanko (2017)
- 15) Fanush (2018)
- 16) Compass (2018)
- 17) Himjug (2018)
- 18) Asampurna (2019)
- 19) Jonakider Bari (2019)
- 20) SafetyPin (2020)
- 21) Babui (2020)
- 22) Chuyanno (2022)
- 23) Chatim (2022)
- 24) Botamghor (2022)
- 25) Neel Roler Laal Roler (2024)
- 26) Sunyo Pother Mallika (2024)
- 27) Choti Golpo (2025)
- 28) Baul suto(2026)

Collection of Short Stories and Novella:

- 1) Unish Kurir Prem (2009)
- 2) Premer Unish Kuri (2017)
- 3) Ponchas ti golpo(2023)

Juvenile Fiction:

- 1) Atal Joler Bandhu (2016)
- 2) Warren Dadur Dhadha Bakso (2017)
- 3) Sada Sonar Deshe (2021)

Poem Books:

- 1) Debotar chilekotha (2016)
- 2) Neel Holud Muffler-er Kache (2018)
- 3) Porigondher sohor (2020)
- 4) Sarajiboner moto (2020)
- 5) Dupur belar kobita (2020)
- 6) Nijeke Bojhai Nispriho (2020)
- 7) Jetuku Amar Noy (2022)
- 8) Biscuit Ronger Bari (2023)

Autobiography:

- 1) Jhaal Lozen (2024)

== Filmography ==
Year	Film	Screenplay	Story	Notes
2009	Go for Goals		Yes	based on his book Patajharar Marshume
2014	Gogoler Kirti	Yes		debut in screenplay writing
2018	Crisscross		Yes	based on his book Crisscross

== Awards ==
- Ananda Puraskar, 2025
