= Song Connection =

Indian Musical TV Show

- Official poster of Song Connection
- Genre: Musical Show
- Directed by: Nilanjan Mukherjee
- Presented by: Gaurav Chakrabarty
- Narrated by: Gaurav Chakrabarty
- Country of origin: India
- Original language: Bengali
- No. of seasons: 1
- No. of episodes: 113

Original release
- Network: Zee Bangla Cinema
- Release: 6 May – 27 August 2024

Song Connection is an Indian Bengali musical show which airs on Zee Bangla Cinema from 6 May 2024. The show is hosted and narrated by Gaurav Chakrabarty.

== Format ==
Song connection is a musical show that will explore the musical world of Bengali and Hindi cinema. Each episode will contain behind-the-scene tales, trivia and stories from cinematic legends. It will create a new dimension to the audience's appreciation of Bengali and Hindi cinema. This show will feature a range of classic and contemporary Bengali and Hindi songs, including film tracks, folk tunes and Rabindra-Sangeet.
