= Gungun Kore Mahua =

- গুনগুন করে মহুয়া
- Directed by: Rajdeep Ghosh
- Written by: Agune Dhekechi Mukh by Malabika Dashgupta and Niswanga Mahua by Diparun Bhattacharya
- Based on: Life of Mahua Roy Choudhury
- Produced by: Rana Sarkar
- Starring: Ankita Mallick; Divyani Mondal; Gaurav Chakrabarty; Arindam Sil
- Production companies: DCM Film and Entertainment
- Release date: October 2026
- Country: India
- Language: Bengali

Gungun Kore Mahua is an upcoming Bengali biographical drama film directed by Rajdeep Ghosh and produced by Rana Sarkar based on the life of leading Bengali actress Mahua Roy Choudhury. The film is scheduled to be released during the Durga Puja of 2026 under the banner of DCM Film and Entertainment.

== Plot ==
The film revolves with the life and career of leading stars of Bengali cinema Mahua Roy Choudhury. It portrays her relationship with mentor Sandhya Roy, professional successes, personal struggles and the circumstances surrounding her mysterious death in 1985.

== Cast ==
- Ankita Mallick as Mahua Roy Choudhury
  - Divyani Mondal as young Mahua Roy Chowdhury
- Ridhima Ghosh as Sandhya Roy
- Gaurav Chakrabarty as Nabin Chatterjee
- Tathagata Mukherjee as Uttam Kumar
- Arindam Sil as Tapan Sinha
- Loknath Dey as Nilanjan Roychowdhury, Mahua 's father
- Prarabdhi Singha as Tilak Chakraborty
- Arpan Ghoshal as Nandan
- Alakananda Guha as Madhabi
