= Arnab Ray =

Indian novelist, blogger and podcaster

- Born: Kolkata, India
- Education: BE, Jadavpur University; PhD, Stony Brook University
- Occupations: Research scientist; blogger; novelist
- Writing career
- Pen name: Greatbong
- Language: English
- Years active: 2004–present
- Genres: Satire; Horror; Crime-thriller; Drama
- Notable works: The Greatbong Blog; May I Hebb Your Attention Pliss; The Mine
- Website: greatbong.net

Arnab Ray is an Indian novelist, blogger, podcaster who currently lives in the United States. While finishing his PhD at Stony Brook University, he started his blog with the name Random Thoughts of a Demented Mind, in August 2004, using Greatbong (bong is an Indian slang for Bengali) as his pen name. The blog focuses on satirical social and political commentary.

Ray embarked on his writing career with May I Hebb Your Attention Pliss, a non-fiction book that came out in 2010, and contained much of the commentary that Ray was known for by then through his blog. This was followed by The Mine, a psychological horror novel that came out in 2012, followed by books in the drama and crime-thriller genres. His last novel The Mahabharata Murders was adapted as a web series Mahabharat Murders on the Bengali OTT platform Hoichoi.

In 2019, Ray renamed his blog as The Greatbong Blog and started a podcast called Attention Pliss!.

== Career ==
Ray was born and brought up in Kolkata. His father Alok Ray is an ex-professor of IIM Calcutta. He graduated from Jadavpur University as a Bachelor in Computer Science and Engineering and went on to finish his PhD in Computer Science from State University of New York at Stony Brook.

He is known for his sarcastic takes on the Indian film industry, Indian politics and society in general. His blog, then called Random Thoughts of a Demented Mind, was awarded the "Indiblog of the Year" at Indibloggies in 2006 and 2008. He has written for several media outlets such as The Washington Post'', Outlook magazine and Live Mint.

He is an agnostic with moderate political beliefs as he has written about in his many blog posts. His first book May I Hebb Your Attention Pliss, published by HarperCollins, was on India Today's Bestsellers list. His second book, The Mine, has also been well received. His third book, Yatrik was published in September 2014.

His fourth book Sultan of Delhi: Ascension, first of a two-part crime-drama, was released in October 2016. It is being adapted as a web series Sultan of Delhi on the OTT platform Disney+ Hotstar, directed by Milan Luthria, starring Tahir Raj Bhasin, Mouni Roy, Vinay Pathak, and others.

The print version of fifth book The Mahabharata Murders, published by Juggernaut Books was released in August 2017, even as the e-version of the book was released through the publisher's app in India. It was adapted as a web series Mahabharat Murders on the Bengali OTT platform Hoichoi.

== Novels ==
- May I Hebb Your Attention Pliss, HarperCollins, 2010 ISBN 9788172239374
- The Mine, Westland (Amazon), 2012 ISBN 9789381626382
- Yatrik, Westland, 2014 ISBN 978-9384030506
- Sultan of Delhi: Ascension, Hachette India, 2016 ISBN 9789351950929
- The Mahabharata Murders, Juggernaut Books, 2017 ISBN 9789386228369
- Shakchunni, Hachette India, 2024 ISBN 9789357318211
