= Deblina Chatterjee =

Indian film and television actress

- Born: Deblina Chatterjee; 21 May 1993 (age 32); Kolkata, West Bengal, India
- Occupation: Actress
- Years active: 2011–present

Deblina Chatterjee is an Indian film and television actress.

== Career ==
She started her career in the performing industry in 2010, after being cast as Aadu in the Bengali feature Ami Aadu (2011), marking her film and acting debut. The movie was directed by Somnath Gupta and was screened at the 2011 IFFI (International Film Festival of India). It went on to win the 58th National Film Award for the Best Feature Film in Bengali.

In 2012, she made her television debut in the Star Plus show Sajda Tere Pyaar Mein as Aaliya Hassan. She also played Gayatri (Gayu) in Yeh Rishta Kya Kehlata Hai on Star Plus from December 2018 to May 2019 and quit the show as she doesn't want to age.

== Television ==
Years	Shows	Role
2012	Sajda Tere Pyaar Mein	Aaliya Hassan / Julia Gomes Pratap
2014	Balika Vadhu	Gauri Jagdish Singh
2015–2017	Sankatmochan Mahabali Hanuman	Sita / Rukmini / Laxmi / Vedavati
2015	Pyaar Tune Kya Kiya	Sanchita
2015	Halla Bol	Aaliya
2015–2016	Sasural Simar Ka	Devika / Patali Devi
2016	Siya Ke Ram	Rumā
2018–2019	Yeh Rishta Kya Kehlata Hai	Gayatri Goenka (Gayu)
2019	Laal Ishq	Paro
2020	Vighnaharta Ganesh	Goddess Lakshmi / Goddess Sita
2022	Rakshabandhan... Rasal Apne Bhai Ki Dhal	Kangana Singh
2023–2024	Karmadhikari Shanidev	Devi Lakshmi

== Filmography ==
Years	Films	Role	Notes
2011	Ami Aadu	Aadu	film and acting debut
