= The Play (film) =

- Directed by: Ranjay Ray Choudhury
- Written by: Ranjay Ray Choudhury
- Produced by: Sankar Chowdhury; Amitava Roy
- Starring: Indrasish Roy; Mumtaz Sorcar; Rajesh Sharma
- Cinematography: Souvik Basu
- Edited by: Sujay Datta Ray
- Music by: Joy Sarkar
- Release date: 6 December 2013
- Running time: 110 minutes
- Country: India
- Language: Bengali

The Play is a 2013 Indian Bengali-language murder mystery thriller film written and directed by Ranjay Ray Choudhury. The film features Rajesh Sharma, Indrasish Roy, and Mumtaz Sorcar in the lead roles. The film revolves around a theatre group where the entire theatre group gets devastated by a series of murders. The filming began in December 2012 and was wrapped up by January 2013. The film was released on 6 December 2013.

== Plot ==
A famous theatre group in Kolkata is ravaged when the members of the group get killed one by one in a span of a single night. Only three of the members, Mainak (Indrasish Roy), Ishika (Mumtaz Sorcar) and Rishabh (Rajdeep Gupta) survive. The task of finding out the truth befalls Mainak, but the answers he was looking for are not what he ends up finding.

== Cast ==
- Ambikesh Sanyal (Rajesh Sharma)
- Mainak (Indrasish Roy)
- Ishika (Mumtaz Sorcar)
- Rishabh (Rajdeep Gupta)
- Ananya (Sampurna Chakraborty) and others

== Music ==
The music and the background score of The Play have been composed by *(Joy Sarkar).

=== Soundtrack ===
1. "Bhromor Koio Giya" - (Anushree Gupta)
2. "Ekta Beparoa Din Ashe" - (Somchanda Bhattacharya), (Timir Biswas)
3. "Ke Barabe Haat" - (Kushal Paul)
4. "Megh Kuyashay Amar Shohor" - (Joy Sarkar)
5. "Bhromor Koio Giya" (Remix)
6. "The Play" Theme

== Reception ==
A critic from The Times of India rated the film 2/5 stars and wrote, "Overall, don’t go to the hall expecting a keep-on-the-edge-of-the-seat thriller, as suspense is not what you’ll get to see".
