= May I Hebb Your Attention Pliss =

2010 book by Arnab Ray

- Author: Arnab Ray
- Publication date: 2010
- Publication place: India

May I Hebb Your Attention Pliss is the first book of Arnab Ray, an Indian blogger. The book is an extension of his blog. It deals with Indian pop culture, Bollywood, satire and his own life experiences. He makes sarcastic comments on the Indian film industry, Indian politics and society in general.

== Reception ==
The book generally met favourable reviews. It was on India Today's Bestsellers list. Times of India Crest said, "Take a chance on Ray; you might enjoy being tickled greatbong style.".The Daily Telegraph said "for a more in-depth insight into the minds of the pubescent adults growing up in the ’80s, do read his Bollywood made me what I am". It also found a mention on the newspaper's surprise hits of 2010. Daily News and Analysis called the satire in the book as "highly entertaining" and that "all said and done, if you grew up in the late eighties and the nineties, this is a book you should not miss." Deccan Herald wrote that "everything from the cover, the title, the blurb and the preface tells you that this is a book worth picking up. It doesn’t disappoint". It considered the book as irreverent but also poignant. Outlook felt the content of the book could make hilarious blog posts "but reading over forty thousand words of this pales quickly". It also pointed out the episodic nature of the chapters with no connection with each other as a sore point. Kanchan Gupta of The Pioneer, on the other hand, commented on the episodic nature of the chapters in MIHYAP (as the author likes to call his book). He said that it gives the reader the freedom to "read in bits and pieces, portions that aren’t particularly interesting can be skipped." It also finds a mention in WorldCat book catalogue.
