= Rehaan Roy =

Indian actor and model

- রেহান রায়
- Born: Rehaan Roy; Kolkata, West Bengal, India
- Occupations: Actor, model, DIY Creator.
- Years active: 2010–present

Rehaan Roy (Born 15 April 1988) is an Indian actor and model who has performed many roles in various Hindi and Bengali television shows. He is known for the lead role of Ishaan in Ogo Bodhu Sundori, Rishi in Sajda Tere Pyaar Mein, Ajgaar in Naagarjuna – Ek Yoddha, Sahil in Ek Vivah Aisa Bhi and Vikram Bhatt's web series Tantra. He also appeared in &TV's daily soap Agniphera as Abhimanyu. He later played the role of Parv Singh in Guddan Tumse Na Ho Payega and Khalid Mirza in Bahu Begum.

== Filmography ==
=== Film ===
- 2010 Amanush as Aditya

=== Television ===
Year	Title	Role
2010	Ogo Bodhu Sundori	Ishaan
2012	Sajda Tere Pyaar Mein	Rishi
2012	Savdhaan India	
2013	Emotional Atyachar	
2014	Pyar Ka The End	
2014	Gumrah: End of Innocence	
2015	Fear Files	Rehaan
2015	Meera	Shubhankar
2016–2017	Naagarjuna - Ek Yoddha	Ajgaar
2017	Thapki Pyaar Ki	Monty Shekhawat
2017	Ek Vivah Aisa Bhi	Sahil Mittal
2018	Agniphera	Abhimanyu
2018–2020	Guddan Tumse Na Ho Payega	Parv Singh
2018–2019	Karn Sangini	Dushasan
2019–2020	Bahu Begum	Khalid Mirza

=== Web series ===
- 2017–2018 Vikram Bhatt's Tantra
