= Seven (2023 TV series) =

- Genre: Crime thriller
- Written by: Anjan Dutt
- Directed by: Anjan Dutt
- Starring: Anjan Dutt; Gaurav Chakrabarty; Ridhima Ghosh; Rahul; Ankita Chakraborty; Suprobhat Das
- Music by: Neel Dutt
- Country of origin: India
- Original language: Bengali
- No. of seasons: 1
- No. of episodes: 7

Production
- Executive producer: Neel Dutt
- Producer: Anjan Dutt
- Cinematography: Pravatendu Mondal
- Editor: Arghyakamal Mitra
- Production company: Anjan Dutt Production

Original release
- Release: 17 March 2023

Seven is a 2023 Bengali crime thriller web series starring Rahul Arunoday Banerjee, Gaurav Chakrabarty, Ridhima Ghosh, Suprobhat Das, Ankita Chakraborty and Anjan Dutt in key roles. Anjan also wrote and directed the series, and it features music scored by Neel Dutt, cinematography by Pravatendu Mondal, and editing by Arghyakamal Mitra. Set in a misty hill station, Seven follows five friends on a trip. Uncovering a bag containing dollars and a gun, the friends soon find themselves entangled in a thrilling mystery. The series premiered on ZEE5 on 17 March 2023.

== Plot ==
Five friends - Subir, Bibek, Ananto, Namita and Ria - embark on a leisure trip to LAVA homestay. On their journey, they stumble upon a bike accident with a bag full of money and a gun. Subir takes the bag, hoping it will solve all their troubles. But the bag and gun soon cause a heated disagreement between them.

== Cast ==
- Anjan Dutt as Raj Basu
- Gaurav Chakrabarty as Bibek
- Ridhima Ghosh as Namita
- Rahul Arunoday Banerjee as Subir
- Suprobhat Das as Ananta
- Ankita Chakraborty as Riya

== Development ==
=== Production ===
The series is produced under the Anjan Dutt Production banner.

=== Release ===
In early 2022, ZEE5 announced a slate of Bengali series and films, with Seven being one of them.

On 11 March 2023, ZEE5 unveiled the first look trailer of Seven depicting five friends on a hilly journey that quickly turns awry after an accident. The unexpected event leaves them with a dead body, a gun, and a bag of money.

This seven-episode series started streaming on ZEE5 from 17 March 2023.
