= Rahasya Romancha Series =

Bengali web series

- Genre: Thriller
- Directed by: Abhirup Ghosh
- Country of origin: India
- Original languages: Bengali; Hindi
- No. of seasons: 3
- No. of episodes: 17

Production
- Production company: Edgy Entertainment

Original release
- Release: 9 August 2019 – 27 November 2020

Rahasya Romancha Series is a Bengali web series. Initially conceived as a thriller movie, it was turned into a web series, streaming on the Bengali OTT platform Hoichoi. It is produced by Edgy Entertainment and directed by Abhirup Ghosh. Season 1 was released in August 2019, with Priyanka Sarkar, Rudranil Ghosh, Souman Bose, Kanchan Mullick, Saayoni Ghosh and Biswanath Basu in the lead roles.

The second season was released in March 2020. Rudranil Ghosh plays a crime boss running an organization of hired killers. Rajdeep Gupta, Shaoli Chattopadhyay, and Kharaj Mukherjee play other pivotal roles.

The third season was released in November 2020. Saurav Das plays the role of a private investigator with Cotard's Syndrome (a rare neuropsychiatric condition in which the patient denies existence of one's own body to the extent of delusions of immortality). Saayoni Ghosh, Kanchan Mallick, Rukma Roy and Saoli Chattopadhyay also played the lead roles. Rudranil Ghosh appeared a cameo as Jhontu Da.

== Episodes ==
Season	Episodes	Originally released
1	5	August 9, 2019
2	6	March 13, 2020
3	6	November 27, 2020

== Season 1 (2019) ==
On 9 August 2019, Hoichoi launched the first season of the Rahasya Romancha Series with 5 episodes. A review of the series in The Indian Express commented favourably on the actors' performances, but found the story lines largely predictable.

=== Episodes ===
No.	Title	Directed by	Original release date
1	"Jhontu Motors 1"	Abhirup Ghosh	9 August 2019
2	"Jhontu Motors 2"	Abhirup Ghosh	9 August 2019
3	"Shokuni 1"	Abhirup Ghosh	9 August 2019
4	"Shokuni 2"	Abhirup Ghosh	9 August 2019
5	"Jhorer Raat"	Abhirup Ghosh	9 August 2019

== Season 2 (2020) ==
Season 2 of the series was released on 13 March 2020.

=== Episodes ===
No.	Title	Directed by	Original release date
1	"Jhontu Motors: Origin - Part 1"	Abhirup Ghosh	13 March 2020
2	"Jhontu Motors: Origin - Part 2"	Abhirup Ghosh	13 March 2020
3	"Jhontu Motors: Origin - Part 3"	Abhirup Ghosh	13 March 2020
4	"The Crime Writer"	Abhirup Ghosh	13 March 2020
5	"The Gym Instructor"	Abhirup Ghosh	13 March 2020
6	"Kalo Nekre"	Abhirup Ghosh	13 March 2020

== Season 3 (2020) ==
On 27 November 2020 hoichoi released the third season of the Rahasya Romancha Series with brand new six episodes. In this season Saurav das made his appearance by playing the role of an iconic character named 'Mora'.

=== Episodes ===
No.	Title	Directed by	Original release date
1	"Homecoming"	Abhirup Ghosh	27 November 2020
2	"Code Name Kalo Nekre"	Abhirup Ghosh	27 November 2020
3	"Dead Man Walking"	Abhirup Ghosh	27 November 2020
4	"The Locked Room Murder"	Abhirup Ghosh	27 November 2020
5	"Shokuni Level 2 Part 1"	Abhirup Ghosh	27 November 2020
6	"Shokuni Level 2 Part 2"	Abhirup Ghosh	27 November 2020
