= Sajda Tere Pyaar Mein =

Indian television series

- Written by: Mitali
- Directed by: Rakesh Kumar
- Starring: Deblina Chatterjee; Shaleen Bhanot; Rohit Roy; Rehaan Roy
- Opening theme: Sajda by Richa Sharma
- Country of origin: India
- Original languages: Hindi; Urdu
- No. of episodes: 91

Production
- Producers: Ravi Ojha & Zama Habib
- Running time: 30 minutes
- Production company: Ravi Ojha Productions

Original release
- Network: STAR Plus
- Release: 14 February – 16 June 2012

Sajda Tere Pyar Mein is an Indian television soap opera which made its debut in 2012 and ended in 2012. The story was about Aliyaa, a college student, finds purpose and reason in life through love. Her patriotism is put to the test as she takes on terrorists. It was axed by the channel due to low viewership ratings.

== Plot ==
Sajda Tere Pyar Mein follows the journey of 21-year-old Aliyaa. She is a modern Muslim student based in Mumbai, where she transforms from a happy-go-lucky girl into a mature young woman. Aliyaa's love interest, Ranveer, is an ATB (Anti-Terrorism Bureau) agent, working for India's external intelligence agency. Ranveer asks Aliyaa for help in catching the underworld don Mahendra Pratap. She comes to a crossroad where she is forced to choose between love and duty.

The story opens in Mumbai, where Aliyaa lives with her elder sister Nafisa, Nafisa's husband Rahib, and their grandmother. Nafisa is a police officer who balances her family duties and her work, while Rahib works in an office. Aliyaa has three close friends: Nargis, who is very close to her and is the only one Aliyaa confides in about her secret mission; and Rishi, a drug-addicted boy who falls in love with Aliyaa. Although Aliyaa tries to help Rishi as a friend, she makes it clear that she doesn't love him.

Aliyaa is approached by Ranveer, who harbors secrets about his past. His family believes he is responsible for his father's death. Ranveer notices that Aliyaa resembles Julia, the wife of Mahendra Pratap, and keeps an eye on her. One night, Aliyaa confronts Ranveer, and he recruits her to help him arrest Mahendra Pratap. After much persuasion, Aliyaa agrees to go undercover as Mehreen.

Mahendra Pratap is a ruthless and aggressive don with a broken heart, having lost his love Julia long ago. He is captivated by Aliyaa's resemblance to Julia, and as planned, they meet, and the mission begins. Mahendra is responsible for causing chaos in Mumbai for his own gain, but eventually, he falls into Ranveer's trap. During a confrontation, Mahendra aims to shoot Aliyaa but cannot bring himself to do it, realizing he can't kill his love and ultimately surrenders.

Ranveer and Aliyaa return to her home, where they face Nafisa and the rest of the family. They realize what Aliyaa has accomplished and are proud of her. Ranveer proposes to Aliyaa's family, seeking their approval to marry her, to which they agree. The story concludes on a happy note.

== Cast ==
Character	Portrayed by	Role
Aaliya Hasan/Julia Gomes Pratap/Mehreen	Deblina Chatterjee	Main Female Protagonist
Ranveer Chauhan/Joe	Shaleen Bhanot	Main Male Protagonist
Mahendra Pratap Singh	Rohit Roy	Underworld Don, Antagonist
	Navni Parihar/Nishigandha Wad	Ranveer's mother
Rishi	Rehaan Roy	Aaliya's best friend and a double agent
Rahib	Rajiv Kumar	Nafisa's husband, Aaliya's brother-in-law
Nafisa Hasan	Nivedita Bhattacharya	Aaliya's elder sister, Rahib's wife, a police officer
Rahib's sister	Bhakti Rathod	Rahib's divorcee sister
Malika	Ankita Bhargava	Raw Agent
	Poonam Joshi	
Sameer	Sailesh Gulabani	Ranveer's brother
