= Moumita Dutta =

Indian physicist

- Education: Rajabazar Science College (University of Calcutta)
- Occupations: Indian Physicist, ISRO
- Notable work: Mars Orbital Mission, 2014

Moumita Dutta is an Indian Physicist working at the Space Applications Centre (SAC), Indian Space Research Organisation (ISRO) - Ahmedabad, as a scientist/engineer. She has expertise in the development and testing of the Optical and IR sensors/instruments/payloads (i.e. cameras and imaging spectrometers). She was part of the team Mars Orbiter Mission (MOM) to put a probe into orbit around Mars in 2014. She contributed significantly in the development of one of the five payloads of MOM.

== Life, education and career ==
Dutta was raised in Kolkata. She read about the Chandrayaan mission as a student and became interested in joining the Indian Space Research Organisation (ISRO) in 2004. Dutta's interest in physics, started in the ninth grade, led to her career as an engineer. Dutta currently works as a Project Manager for the Mars Mission. Dutta obtained her M Tech degree in Applied Physics from the Rajabazar Science College, University of Calcutta. She joined the Space Applications Centre, Ahmedabad in 2006. Since then she has been involved in many prestigious projects like Oceansat, Resourcesat, HySAT, Chandrayan I and Mars Orbiter Mission. She was chosen to work as Project Manager for the Methane Sensor for Mars and was given the responsibility for the development of the complete optical system, optimisation and characterisation and calibration of the sensor. Presently she is also leading a team in the indigenous development of optical instruments (i.e. imaging spectrometers) and working towards the realisation of the ‘Make in India’ concept. Her research area includes miniaturisation of gas sensors which involves state-of-the-art technologies in the field of optics.

== Awards ==
She is a recipient of the ISRO Team of Excellence Award for the Mangalyaan.

== Interests ==
Besides being a space scientist, she is interested in literature, creative writing, recitation and music.
