= Orko Sinha =

Arka Sinha
- Born: 12 May 1987 (age 38)
- Occupations: director, actor, lyricist, engineer, singer, composer, script writer

Arka Sinha/Orko Sinha (born 12 May 1987) is an Indian film maker, actor, writer, lyricist, singer, composer, producer and a former computer science engineer from the movie industry of West Bengal, Kolkata. He marked his debut with Aamar Aami in December 2013. The script-screenplay-lyrics-dialogues and direction of the film were all by Orko.

== Early life ==
Orko completed his schooling from Sibpur Bengal Engineering College Model School and then, went on to complete his graduation in computer science and engineering from the Heritage Institute of Technology, Kolkata. After getting placed in a MNC, he left the job to join the film industry.

== Career ==
During his school and college days, Orko was actively involved in many professional cultural activities. He was the first assistant director in Buddhadeb Dasgupta’s Janala (The Window) and was an observer in Goutam Ghose’s Moner Manush. Then he worked as script writer and floor director for a documentary feature – Inspiration, directed by Goutam Ghose about the Saha Institute of Nuclear Physics.

He made his acting debut on Bengali television (Sananda TV) as a supporting actor in Sobinoy Nibedon.

In 2013, at the age of 26, Orko directed his debut feature Aamar Aami, a story of a few scattered souls, chasing their dreams in the city. He wrote the story, script, dialogue, screenplay and lyrics, and received the "Best Upcoming Lyricist Award" for the song "Onno Keu Thakbe Kachakachi" at the 4th Mirchi Music Awards Bangla.

In 2015, Orko made his second film for Zee Bangla Originals, titled Amoler Cabin. The film received a positive response after its screening. In Amoler Cabin, for the first time Orko composed a song by himself and also worked as a playback singer. .

== Filmography ==
As director

- Aamar Aami – 2014
- Amoler Cabin – 2016 (Zee Bangla Originals)

As assistant director

- Janala – The Window (2009)
- Moner Manush (Uncredited) (2010)

As Script writer

- Sudhamoy Babur Odbhut Galpo (Short) (2010)
- Aamar Aami (2014)
- Amoler Cabin (2016)

As actor

- Sobinoy Nibedon (TV) (2011)
- Loadsheding (2015) (Zee Bangla Original)

As lyricist

- Aamar Aami (2014)
- Amoler Cabin (2016)

As singer

- Amoler Cabin (2016)

As music composer

- Amoler Cabin (2016)
