= Crisscross (film) =

2018 Indian Bengali film by Birsa Dasgupta

- Theatrical release poster
- Directed by: Birsa Dasgupta
- Based on: Criss Cross by Smaranjit Chakraborty
- Produced by: Shrikant Mohta; Mahendra Soni
- Starring: Nusrat Jahan; Mimi Chakraborty; Jaya Ahsan; Sohini Sarkar; Priyanka Sarkar; Ridhima Ghosh; Arjun Chakrabarty; Gaurav Chakrabarty
- Music by: JAM8
- Production company: Shree Venkatesh Films
- Distributed by: Shree Venkatesh Films
- Release date: 10 August 2018
- Running time: 1h 53m
- Country: India
- Language: Bengali

Crisscross (2018) is an Indian Bengali-language drama film directed by Birsa Dasgupta which is based on Smaranjit Chakraborty's 2013 novel of the same name. The film is produced by Shrikant Mohta and Mahendra Soni under the banner of SVF Entertainment. It stars Nusrat Jahan, Mimi Chakraborty, Bangladeshi actress Jaya Ahsan, Sohini Sarkar, Priyanka Sarkar.The film was released on 10 August 2018.

== Plot ==
Crisscross is primarily the story of five women from various walks of life. They all live in the city of Kolkata, and none of them are happy. Suzy is a freelance graphic designer who just can't seem to get work, or in the rare occasion when she does, never gets paid on time. She is a single mother with a drug-addict ex-husband, trying to put food on the table and giving her son a good education, even as the wolves and vultures keep circling her day and night. Meher is an aspiring actress trying to remain afloat by doing bit roles here and there, auditioning for good roles and getting humiliated on a daily basis. She has a widowed mother and a sickly brother to take care of, but the money just doesn't seem to come in. Miss Sen is a successful independent businesswoman who seems to be ruthless in her career ambitions – so much so that she has separated from her husband and her daughter. However, her business is weathering a storm, and she has been making some wrong moves, until a shocking revelation explains why. Rupa is a timid middle-class housewife who is constantly abused by her in-laws. While her mother-in-law blames her for not being able to conceive, her husband is always bickering at her. To make matters worse, there's this slimy good-for-nothing brother-in-law, who keeps abusing her mentally and physically by making direct sexual advances. Rupa bears it all, until one day, when she learns that she has a terminal disease. Finally, there's Ira a successful and independent photojournalist, who struggles to strike a balance between her career and a caring but priority-demanding boyfriend who wants to marry her. The stories of each of these women run crisscross, intersecting each other, and in one way or another, affecting each other.

== Cast ==
- Nusrat Jahan as Meher
- Mimi Chakraborty as Ira
- Jaya Ahsan as Miss (Reena) Sen
- Sohini Sarkar as Rupa
- Priyanka Sarkar as Suzy
- Ridhima Ghosh as Urna
- Arjun Chakrabarty as Archie
- Gaurav Chakrabarty as Ahan
- Mithu Chakrabarty as Meher's Mother
- Dolon Roy as Ira's Mother
- Anindita Raychaudhury as Boudi
- Ambarish Bhattacharya as Rupa's Husband
- Mainak Banerjee as Rupa's Brother-in-law
- Phalguni Chatterjee as Mr. Dasgupta, Assistant of Ms. Sen
- Saswati Guhathakurta as Suzy's neighbor
- Sudeshna Roy as Suzy's son's Principal

== Soundtrack ==
Crisscross

Soundtrack album by JAM8
- Released: 2018
- Recorded: 2018
- Studio: Shree Venkatesh Films
- Genre: Feature film soundtrack
- Label: SVF

Singles from Crisscross
- 1. "Duniya" Released: 8 July 2018; 2. "Momer Shohor" Released: 20 July 2018; 3. "Alo Chhaya" Released: 28 July 2018; 4. "Bari Phire Aye" Released: 16 August 2018

The music is composed by JAM8.

No.	Title	Lyrics	Music	Singer(s)	Length
1.	"Duniya"	Smaranjit Chakraborty	Subhadeep Mitra for JAM8	Nikhita Gandhi	3:52
2.	"Momer Shohor"	Smaranjit Chakraborty	Keeran for JAM8	Tushar Joshi	3:30
3.	"Aalo Chaya"	Smaranjit Chakraborty	Shubham Shirule For JAM8	Armaan Malik	4:12
4.	"Bari Phire Aye"	Prasen (Prasenjit Mukherjee)	Swastika & Sagnik for JAM8	Nikhita Gandhi	4:04
