= Rajdeep Gupta =

Indian actor

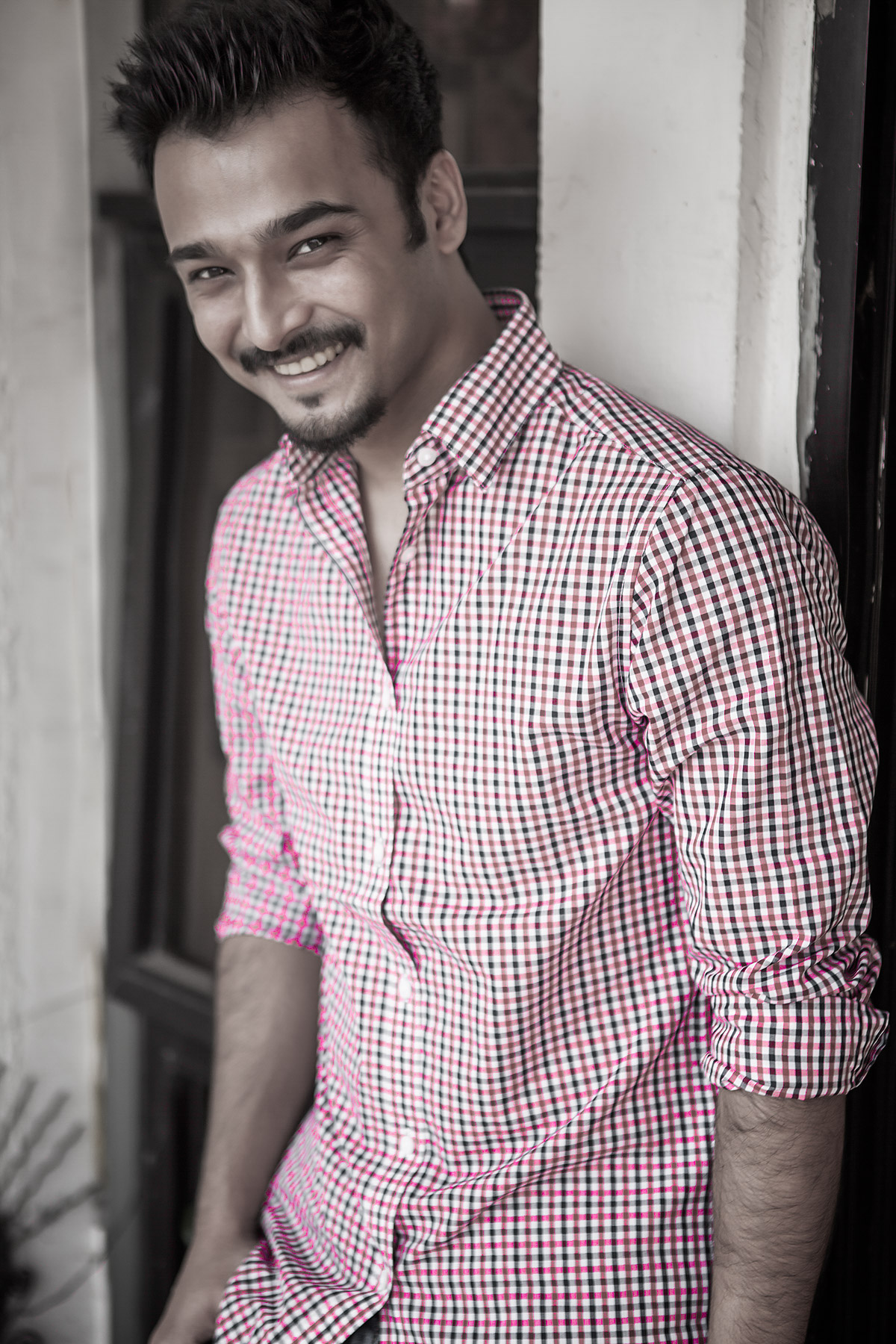
- Born: October 29, 1987; 39 years ago Kolkata, West Bengal, India
- Occupation: Actor / Dj
- Years active: 2008–present
- Parent(s): Rajesh Gupta (father), Deepa Gupta (mother)
- Awards: Telesamman Award for Best Debutante (2010), Tele Academy Award for Best Actor in Television (2014)

Rajdeep Gupta is an Indian actor who works in Bengali cinema, television, and web series.

He has appeared in productions such as the film The Play (2013), the series Byomkesh (2014), and the television series Ogo Bodhu Sundori (2009).

== Career ==
Rajdeep Gupta was born on 29 October 1987 in West Bengal, India, and raised in Kolkata. Before entering the entertainment industry, he had a brief stint as a DJ, performing at popular clubs in Delhi, Kolkata, and Dhaka. His passion for acting led him to the small screen, where he debuted in 2009 as Ishaan in the hit television series Ogo Bodhu Sundori, produced by Ravi Ojha Productions and aired on Star Jalsha. The show became a massive success.

In 2014 Gupta appeared in the episodic detective drama Byomkesh. He later starred in lead roles in shows like Aponjon (produced by Surinder Films) and Jhanjh Lobongo Phool (produced by SVF). He portrayed a negative character for the first time in Premer Kahini (Star Jalsha) in 2017.

Gupta's film career began with Damadol in 2013, followed by critically acclaimed projects Bhaarate, Aamar Aami, Mukti, and Dwitiyo Bosonto. His foray into Hindi television came with Pyaar Ka The End.

He has also established himself in the digital entertainment space. He starred in popular Hoichoi Originals such as Japani Toy, Mismatch, Japani Doll, Bou Keno Psycho, Rohoshya Romancho, Murder in the Hills, and Uttoron.

Gupta served as the face of national campaigns for renowned brands, including the 2016 Uber India campaign.

He has earned multiple accolades for his contributions across multiple platforms.

== Filmography ==
=== Film ===
- Damadol (2013)
- The Play (2013)
- Mukti (2013)
- Bharaate (2014)
- Onnyo Basonto (2014)
- Mon Jane Na (2015)
- Bagh Bondhir Khela (2015)
- Teen Cup Chaa (2018)

=== Television ===
- Ogo Bodhu Sundori (Star Jalsha)
- Jhaanjh Lobongo Phool (Star Jalsha)
- Premer Kahini (Star Jalsha)
- Ponchomi (Star Jalsha)
- Jai Kali Kalkatte Wali (Zee Bangla)
- Baksho Bodol (Zee Bangla)
- Apanjon (Colors Bangla)
- Dwitiyo Basanta (Sun Bangla)
- Pyaar Ka The End (UTV Bindass)
- Rajrajeshwari Rani Bhabani (Star Jalsha)

== Web series ==
Year	Series	OTT	Character
2018	Japani Toy	Hoichoi	
2018	Mismatch	Hoichoi	
2018	Bou Keno Psycho	Hoichoi	
2019	Mismatch 2	Hoichoi	
2019	Japani Doll	Hoichoi	
2020	Rahasya Romancha Series	Hoichoi	
2020	Mismatch 3	Hoichoi	Imtiaz
2021	Murder in the Hills	Hoichoi	Suvankar
2021	Dware Bouma	Uribaba	
2022	Uttoron	Hoichoi	
2022	Mahabharat Murders	Hoichoi	
2024	Kaalratri	Hoichoi	
2025	Nishir Daak	Hoichoi	

== Awards ==
Year	Award	Category	Work	Result
2009	Telesanman Award	Debutant TV Award	Ogo Bodhu Sundori	Won
2009	Anandolok Awards	Best actor TV		Nominated
2010	Telesanman Award	Best Actor - TV	Ogo Bodhu Sundori	Won
2010	Jalsha Awards	Best Actor - TV		Nominated
2012	Yatra Pothe Sanmam Awards	Debutant Film	Damadol	Won
2012	BFJ Awards	Best Supporting Actor - Film		Nominated
2016	Telecine Awards	Best Actor - TV	Jhanj Lobongo Phool	Won
2016	Telecine awards	Negative role TV		Nominated
2015	Tele Academy Award	Best Actor - TV	Aponjon	Won
2022	Josh Popular Choice Award	Popular Choice Award		Won
2018	Rising Star OTT Award			Won
2019	Katha Kahini Awards	OTT Face of the Year		Won
2024	Bengal Achievers Award	Best Actor - TV	Dwitiyo Bosonto	Won
