= Ridhima Ghosh =

Indian actress (born 1989)

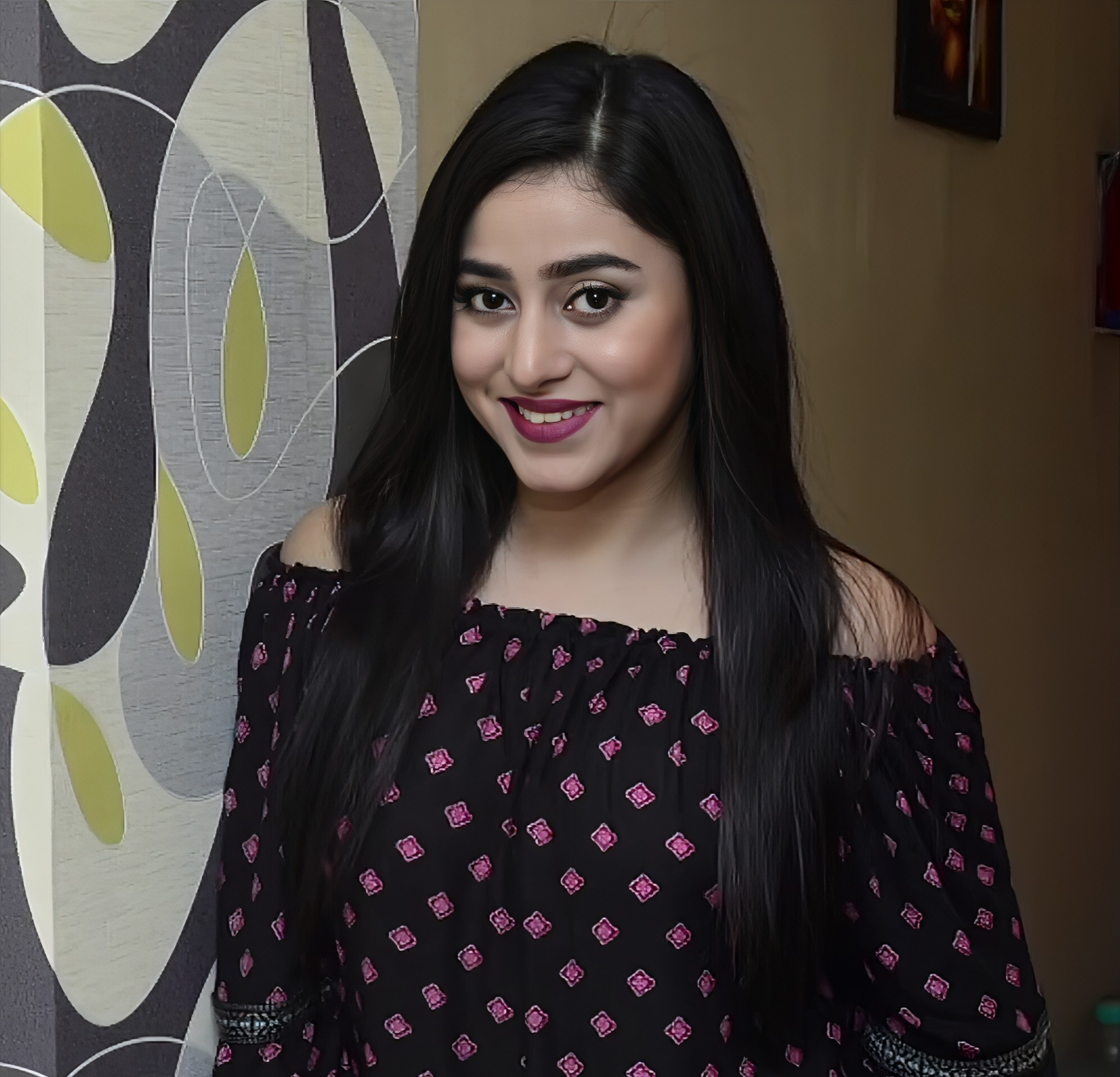
- Ridhima in 2017
- Born: 18 January 1989 (age 37); Kolkata, West Bengal, India
- Education: Loreto House; Bhawanipur Education Society College
- Occupation: Actress
- Years active: 2007–present
- Spouse: Gaurav Chakrabarty (m. 2017)
- Children: Dheer
- Relatives: Sabyasachi Chakrabarty (father-in-law); Mithu Chakrabarty (mother-in-law); Arjun Chakrabarty (brother-in-law)

Ridhima Ghosh is an Indian Bengali actress who works in film and television. She made her film debut with Sanghamitra Chaudhuri's Raatporir Rupkotha (2007). She later made her television debut in the Bengali series Bou Kotha Kao (2009).

== Career ==
Ridhima Ghosh made her television debut in the Star Jalsha megaserial Bou Kotha Kao. She made her film debut with Raatporir Rupkotha, directed by Sanghamitra Chaudhuri and released in 2007. Ghosh returned to television in 2014 with Byomkesh, which aired on Colors Bangla.

== Filmography ==
- Raatporir Rupkotha
- Friend
- Amar Sangi
- Love Connection
- Piriti Kathaler Aatha
- Rang Milanti
- Laptop
- Hothat Sedin
- Bicycle Kick
- Kidnapper
- Amar Bodyguard
- Aashbo Aar Ekdin
- Half Serious
- Fakebook
- Aagun
- Rajkahini
- Crisscross
- Dwitiyo Purush
- Tenida and Company
- Nikhnoj
- Gungun Kore Mahua

== Television ==
- Bou Kotha Kao
- Byomkesh
- Mahanayak
- Judhishthir
- Akash Choan
- Jamai Elo Ghore

== Short films and web series ==
- Spinning a Yarn - A Nextiles Story
- Byomkesh (S1-S3, S5-S8)
- Shesh Theke Suru
- Oh! Mother (S1)
- The Big Bong Connection
- The Poetic Justice
- Humsafar
- Bhalobashar Shohor (Pori)
- Mafia
- Seven
- Kuheli
- Shwetkali 2

== Reality show ==
- Randhane Bandhan

== Awards and nominations ==
Year	Award	Category	Film/TV Show	Result
2021	Films and Frames Digital Film Awards	Best Supporting Actor Female (OTT)	Mafia	Nominated
2026	Bengal's Most Stylish	Stylish Couple (With Gaurav Chakrabarty)	—N/a	Won
