= Gaurav Chakrabarty =

Indian actor (born 1987)

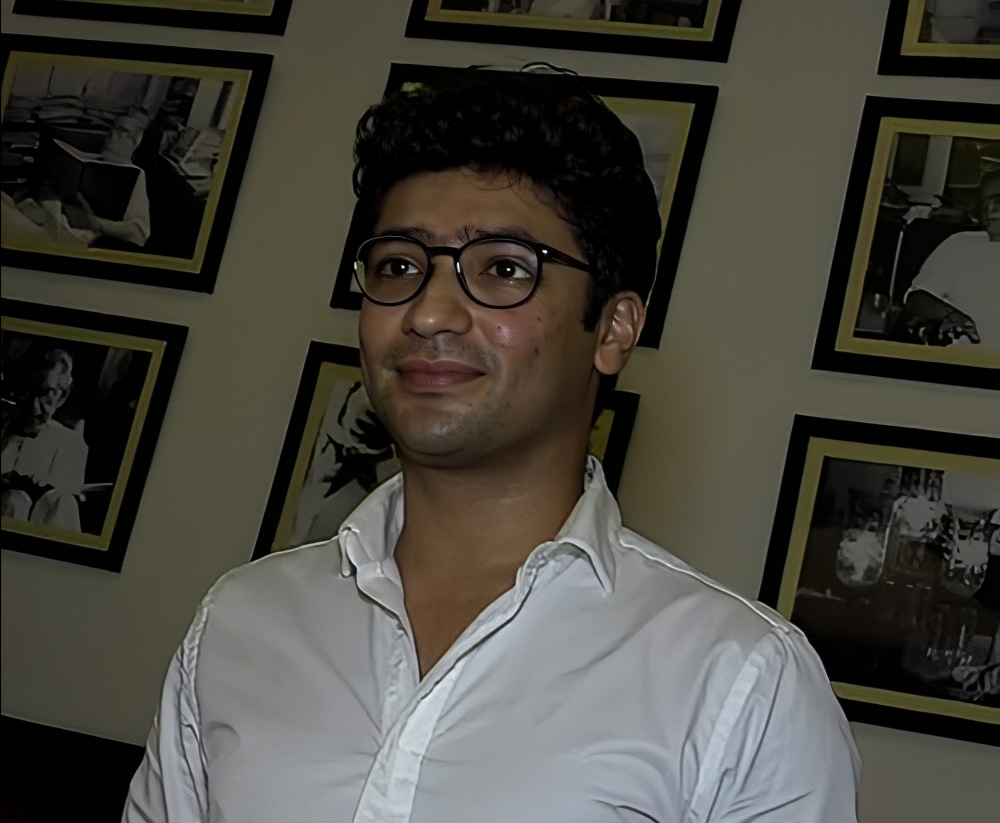
- Gaurav in 2019
- Born: 6 March 1987 (age 39); Calcutta, West Bengal, India
- Other name: Niki
- Education: Assembly of God Church School, Park Street; St. Xavier's College, Kolkata; Film and Television Institute of India, Pune
- Occupation: Actor
- Years active: 2007–present
- Height: 1.75 m (5 ft 9 in)
- Spouse: Ridhima Ghosh (m. 2017)
- Children: Dheer
- Parent(s): Sabyasachi Chakrabarty (father); Mithu Chakrabarty (mother)
- Relatives: Arjun Chakrabarty (brother)

Gaurav Chakrabarty is an Indian Bengali actor who works in film and television. He made his television debut in the Star Jalsha series Gaaner Oparey (2010–2011), portraying Prodipto Lahiri. He subsequently portrayed the Byomkesh Bakshi in the television series Byomkesh (2014–2015). Chakrabarty made his film debut in Kaushik Ganguly's Rang Milanti (2011).

== Career ==
Gaurav Chakrabarty made his television debut alongside his younger brother, Arjun Chakrabarty, in the Star Jalsha megaserial Gaaner Oparey. Chakrabarty made his film debut with the romantic comedy Rang Milanti, directed by Kaushik Ganguly and released in September 2011. He returned to television in 2014 with Byomkesh, which aired on Colors Bangla. Earlier in his career, he appeared as a child actor in Ekushey Paa, which aired on Zee Bangla, then known as Alpha Bangla, in 1995.

== Filmography ==
- Rang Milanti
- Laptop
- Chhayamoy
- Rupkatha Noy
- Aashbo Arek Din
- Apur Panchali
- Highway
- Fakebook
- Aagun
- Eagoler Chokh
- Gangster
- Colkatay Columbus
- Double Feluda
- The Bongs Again
- Aschhe Abar Shabor
- Crisscross
- Bhootchakra Pvt. Ltd.
- Parineeta
- Purba Paschim Dakshin
- Sagardwipey Jawker Dhan
- Dwitiyo Purush
- Cholo Potol Tuli
- Flyover
- Ei Ami Renu
- Nirbhaya
- Swastik Sanket
- Abar Kanchanjungha
- Bismillah
- Ajker Shortcut
- Tenida and Company
- Mayaa
- The Eken: Benaras e Bibhishika
- Sonar Kellay Jawker Dhan
- Saralakkha Holmes
- Mitin: Ekti Khunir Sandhaney
- Gungun Kore Mahua

== Television ==
- Shei Somoy
- Ekushey Paa
- Bagh Nokh
- Gaaner Oparey
- Adwitiya
- Byomkesh
- Mahanayak
- Gupi Gayen
- Shesh Mess

== Theatre ==
- Apsara Theatre-er Mamla
- Ekhon Tokhon
- Chitey Gur
- Mushkil Ashaan
- Shironaam
- Bheeti O Shubhechcha

== Short films and web series ==
- Spinning a Yarn - A Nextiles Story
- Bumper
- Shrimoti Bhoyonkori
- Mukhomukhi
- Bhalobashar Shohor (Pori)
- Parking
- Lalbazaar
- Seven
- Abar Proloy
- Chhotolok
- Parnashavarir Shaap
- Kolonko
- Parineeta
- Nikosh Chhaya
- Bibaho Ottopor
- Khujechi Toke Raat Berate
- Nikosh Chhaya 2
- Byomkesh Bakshi

== Music video ==
- Saiyaan
- Brishti

== Reality show ==
- Song Connection
- Randhane Bandhan

== Awards and nominations ==
Year	Award	Category	Film/TV show	Result
2012	Star Jalsha Parivaar Awards	Sobcheye Priyo Khalnayak	Adwitiya	Won
2012	Star Guide Bengali Film Awards	Best Male Debut	Rang Milanti	Won
2012	International Bangla Film Academy Awards	Promising Face of the Year	Rang Milanti	Nominated
2015	Tele Academy Award	Best Actor in a Leading Role	Byomkesh	Won
2016	Solo Room Award	Best Young Talent	Contribution in Bengali Film Industry	Won
2019	AAHAN International Short Film Festival	Best Editing	Bumper	Won
2021	Films and Frames Digital Film Awards	Best Supporting Actor Male (OTT)	Lalbazaar	Won
2021	Films and Frames Digital Film Awards	Trendsetting Performance of the Year-Male (Jury)	Flyover	Nominated
2023	West Bengal Film Journalists' Association Awards	Best Actor in a Negative Role	Bismillah	Nominated
2023	India Audio Summit and Awards 2022	Best Show Host	Gaurav Bolchhi	Won
2025	Redwine OTT Samman 2025	Best Actor In a Leading Role Male	Parineeta	Won
2026	Bengal's Most Stylish	Stylish Couple (With Ridhima Ghosh)	—N/a	Won
