= List of works by Rituparna Sengupta =

Rituparna Sengupta filmography
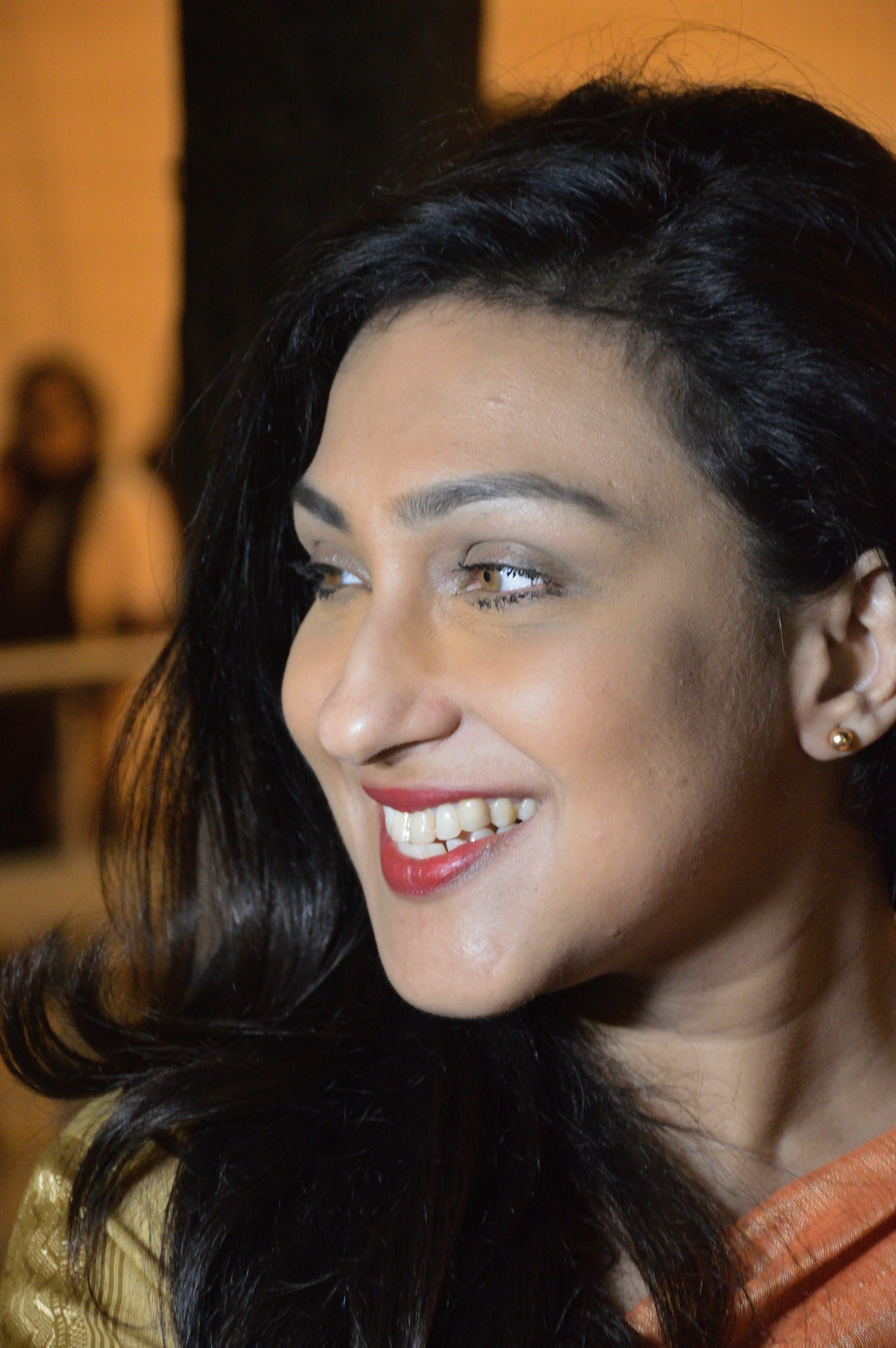
- Rituparna Sengupta at Nandan in 2018
- Film: 218
- Television film: 1
- Television series: 10+
- Hosting: 1
- Music videos: 1

Rituparna Sengupta is an Indian actress and producer who is known for her work in the Bengali cinema industries of both West Bengal and Bangladesh, as well as in Hindi cinema. She has appeared in a total of 218 films among which 181 are Bengali films, 33 Hindi films, 4 Oriya films and one each in English, Malayalam, Kannada and Telugu.

Sengupta made her screen debut opposite Arindam Ganguly in the episode Sada Payra in Bimal Bhowmik's Bengali fantasy TV series Rong Berong (1988) produced by Ratna Ghoshal and broadcast on DD Bangla. She made her big screen venture opposite Arjun Chakraborty in the Bengali film Bahattar Din Par (1990). She gained prominence after she featured opposite Bijay Mohanty in the Odia fim Kotia Manish Gotiye Jaga (1991) directed by Vijay Bhaskar. She had a very successful on-screen romantic collaboration with Chinranjeet, Prosenjit and Abhishek Chatterjee.

== Bengali television and films ==
=== Television ===
Year	Title	Episode	Role	Director	Note	Ref.
1988	Rong Berong	Sada Payra	White Dove	Bimal Bhowmik	Debut	
1989	Shwet Kapot					
1989	Seemana Chariye					
1990	Kalpurush			Raja Dasgupta		
1990	Hortoner Golam			Rathin Dhar		
1993	Cinemawalla			Dulal Lahiri	Played Alpana Goswami	
1995	Andolan			Prabhat Roy		

=== Films ===
Key
†	Denotes films that have not yet been released

Year	Title	Director	Co-actor	Note	Ref.
1990	Bahattar Din Par		Arjun Chakraborty		
1992	Shwet Pathorer Thala	Prabhat Roy	Bhaskar Banerjee		
1994	Laal Paan Bibi	Prashanta Nanda	Chiranjeet Chakraborty		
1994	Nagpanchami	Bhijoy Bhaskar	Prosenjit Chatterjee		
1994	Shesh Chithi	Shishir Majumdar	Arup Pal		
1995	Bhagya Debata	Raghuram	Mithun Chakraborty		
1995	Naginkanya	Swapan Saha	Chiranjeet Chakraborty		
1995	Rakhal Raja	Sanat Dutta	Chiranjeet Chakraborty		
1995	Sansar Sangram	Chiranjeet Chakraborty	Chiranjeet Chakraborty	Shared the screen with Satabdi Roy for the first time	
1995	Sujan Sakhi	Swapan Saha	Abhishek Chatterjee		
1996	Abujh Mon	Swapan Saha	Prosenjit Chatterjee		
1996	Karna	Milan Bhowmik	Arjun Chakraborty		
1996	Lathi	Prabhat Roy	Abhishek Chatterjee		
1996	Miss Maitree	Biresh Chatterjee	Abhishek Chatterjee		
1996	Sei Raat	Bimal Dey	Abhishek Chatterjee		
1997	Adarer Bon	Swapan Saha	Abhishek Chatterjee		
1997	Bouthan	Milan Bhowmik	Abhishek Chatterjee		
1997	Danab	Sachin Adhikari	Siddhanta Mahapatra		
1997	Chandragrahan	Anjan Banerjee	Chiranjeet Chakraborty		
1997	Joddha	Prabhat Roy	Chiranjeet Chakraborty		
1997	Gaane Bhuban Bhoriye Debo	Putul Guha	Kumar Sanu		
1997	Joyee	Sachin Adhikari	Abhishek Chatterjee		
1997	Matribhumi	Milan Bhowmik	Abhishek Chatterjee		
1997	Nishpap Asami	Swapan Saha	Abhishek Chatterjee		
1997	Matir Manush	Swapan Saha	Prosenjit Chatterjee		
1997	Mayar Badhon	Swapan Saha	Prosenjit Chatterjee		
1997	Moner Manush	Sujit Guha	Prosenjit Chatterjee		
1997	Pabitra Papi	Anup Sengupta	Prosenjit Chatterjee		
1997	Samadhan	Narayan Ghosh	Prosenjit Chatterjee		
1997	Swami Keno Ashami	Monowar Khokon	Chunky Pandey	Bangladeshi film	
1997	Tomake Chai	Swapan Saha	Prosenjit Chatterjee		
1998	Baba Keno Chakor	Swapan Saha	Prosenjit Chatterjee		
1998	Aamar Maa	Dilip Biswas	Prosenjit Chatterjee		
1998	Aami Sei Meye	Prosenjit Chatterjee			
1998	Bishnu Narayan	Sanat Dutta	Chiranjeet Chakraborty		
1998	Dahan	Rituparno Ghosh	Abhishek Chatterjee		
1998	Desh Dorodi	Sharif Uddin Khan Dipu	Manna	Bangladeshi film	
1998	Mayer Adhikar	Narayan Ghosh	Prosenjit Chatterjee		
1998	Mayer Dibyi	Swapan Saha	Abhishek Chatterjee		
1998	Praner Cheye Priyo	Swapan Saha	Abhishek Chatterjee		
1998	Naag Nagini	Swapan Saha	Abhishek Chatterjee		
1998	Meyerao Manush	Monowar Khokon	Chunky Pandey	Bangladeshi film	
1998	Ranga Bou		Amin Khan, Humayun Faridi	Bangladeshi film	
1998	Sagorika	Badol Khandokar	Helal Khan	Bangladeshi film	
1998	Shesh Kartabya	Shantanu Bhowmik			
1998	Sindurer Adhikar	Anup Sengupta	Prosenjit Chatterjee		
1998	Sundari	Swapan Saha	Prosenjit Chatterjee		
1998	Tomar Aamar Prem		Amin Khan		
1999	Agni Shikha	Sujit Guha	Prosenjit Chatterjee		
1999	Atmiyo Swajan	Raja Sen	Tapas Paul		
1999	Chena Achena	Subhas Sen	Abhishek Chatterjee		
1999	Daye Dayitwa	Haranath Chakraborty	Prosenjit Chatterjee		
1999	Khelaghar	Prabhat Roy	Prosenjit Chatterjee		
1999	Love in Thailand		Shakil Khan		
1999	Sankha Sindurer Dibyi	Ratul Ganguly	Abhishek Chatterjee		
1999	Madhu Malati	Swapan Saha	Prosenjit Chatterjee		
1999	Santan Jakhan Satru	Swapan Saha	Prosenjit Chatterjee		
1999	Shatru Mitra	Narayan Ghosh	Prosenjit Chatterjee		
1999	Shudhu Ekbar Bolo	Prabhat Roy	Prosenjit Chatterjee		
1999	Sindur Khela	Partho Ghosh	Chiranjeet Chakraborty, Prosenjit Chatterjee		
1999	Siraj	Ranen Modak	Arjun Chakraborty		
1999	Swamir Ghar	Swapan Saha	Prosenjit Chatterjee		
1999	Tomay Pabo Bole	Swapan Saha	Prosenjit Chatterjee		
1999	Tumi Ele Tai	Prabhat Roy	Prosenjit Chatterjee		
2000	Shesh Juddho	Chotku Ahmed	Manna	Bangladeshi film	
2000	Amader Sansar	Dilip Biswas	Abhishek Chatterjee, Ferdous, Sreelekha Mitra		
2000	Bastir Meye Radha	Chiranjeet Chakraborty	Chiranjeet Chakraborty, Roopa Ganguly		
2000	Chakrabyuha		Indrajit		
2000	Bhalobasi Tomake	Swapan Saha	Prosenjit Chatterjee		
2000	Ei Ghar Ei Sansar	Swapan Saha	Prosenjit Chatterjee		
2000	Goriber Samman	Swapan Saha	Omar Sani		
2000	Dharma Adharma	Pijush Debnath	Chiranjeet Chakraborty		
2000	Jummon Koshai	Uttam Akash	Manna	Bangladeshi film	
2000	Killer	Sohanur Rahman Sohan	Manna	Bangladeshi film	
2000	Kulangar		Prosenjit Chatterjee		
2000	Madhur Milan	Tushar Majumdar	Prosenjit Chatterjee		
2000	Parichay	Bidesh Sarkar	Tapas Paul		
2000	Paromitar Ek Din	Aparna Sen	Aparna Sen		
2000	Prem Priti Bhalobasa				
2000	Aasroy	Haranath Chakraborty	Prosenjit Chatterjee		
2000	Sasurbari Zindabad	Haranath Chakraborty	Prosenjit Chatterjee		
2000	Utsab	Rituparno Ghosh	Prosenjit Chatterjee		
2000	Palta Hamla	F. I. Manik	Amit Hasan, Shakib Khan	Bangladeshi film	
2001	Aghat	Anup Sengupta	Prosenjit Chatterjee		
2001	Shesh Bongshodhor	Shah Alam Kiran	Manna	Bangladeshi film	
2001	Chairman	Montazur Rahman Akbar	Ilias Kanchan	Bangladeshi film	
2001	Hatiyar		Chiranjeet Chakraborty, Prosenjit Chatterjee		
2001	Guru Shisya	Swapan Saha	Prosenjit Chatterjee		
2001	Jabab Chai	Swapan Saha	Prosenjit Chatterjee		
2001	Jamaibabu Jindabad	Ratan Adhikary	Prosenjit Chatterjee		
2001	Ostaad	Subhas Sen	Ferdous		
2001	Prem Pratigya	Sujit Guha	Prosenjit Chatterjee		
2001	Sud Asal	Narayan Ghosh	Prosenjit Chatterjee		
2002	Eri Naam Bhalobasha		Manna	Bangladeshi film	
2002	Jibon Juddho	Shah Alam Kiran	Amin Khan		
2002	Suorani Duorani		Ferdous		
2002	Jonom Jonomer Sathi	Dulal Bhoumik	Ferdous		
2002	Phool Aur Pathar	Dulal Bhoumik	Ferdous		
2002	Manush Amanush		Chiranjeet Chakraborty		
2002	Protihingsha	Mohanji Prasad	Prosenjit Chatterjee, Ferdous		
2002	Streer Maryada	Swapan Saha	Prosenjit Chatterjee		
2002	Tak Misti Jiban		Tapas Paul		
2003	Alo	Tarun Majumdar	Kunal Mitra		
2003	Mondo Meyer Upakhyan	Buddhadev Dasgupta	Tapas Paul	Played mother to Samata Das	
2003	Path				
2003	Sukh Dukkher Sansar	Swapan Saha	Abhishek Chatterjee		
2004	Agun Jwalbei	Shah Alam Kiran	Amin Khan		
2004	Abhishek	Shankar Roy	Tapas Paul		
2004	Akritagya	Dilip Biswas	Ferdous		
2004	Aakrosh		Jeet		
2004	Debipaksha	Raja Sen	Sandhya Roy, Satabdi Roy, Koel Mallick		
2004	Kalo Chita	Satarupa Sanyal			
2004	Mamatar Bandhan				
2004	Mon Jake Chay				
2004	Prem Korechi Besh Korechi	Badol Khandokar	Riaz		
2004	Sagar Kinare	Sushanta Saha	Ferdous	Shared the screen with Debashree Roy for the first time	
2004	Swami Chhintai	Sohanur Rahman Sohan	Manna		
2005	Dwitiya Basanta		Sabyasachi Chakraborty		
2005	Maayer Raja		Jisshu Sengupta		
2005	Nishijapon	Sandip Ray	Sabyasachi Chakraborty		
2005	Shaktimaan	K. Ravi			
2006	Andhakarer Shabdo	Ashoke Viswanathan	Jisshu Sengupta		
2006	Byatikromi				
2006	Ganyer Meye Shahure Bou				
2006	Hungama	Swapan Saha	Mithun Chakraborty		
2006	Mahasangram	Kumarjit Patitundu	Kushal Chakraborty	Delayed release	
2006	Tapasya		Samrat Mukerji		
2006	Ronangon	Sushanta Saha	Manna		
2007	Anuranan	Aniruddha Roy Chowdhury	Rahul Bose		
2007	Chander Bari	Tarun Majumdar			
2008	Aaynate	Dulal Dey			
2008	Chaturanga	Suman	Joy Sengupta		
2008	Ke Tumi	Prasun Banerjee	Tapas Paul		
2008	Mon Amour Shesher Kobita Revisited	Subhrajit Mitra	Saheb Chatterjee		
2008	Phera	Partha Sarathi Jowardar			
2009	Risk	Riingo Banerjee	Amitabh Bhattacharjee		
2009	Trishna	Pritam Jalan	Anshumaan		
2010	Arohan				
2010	Mahanagar@Kolkata	Suman Mukhopadhyay	Chandan Roy Sanyal		
2010	Pahadi Moina	Ramnath Roy			
2010	Rehmat Ali	Partho Ghosh	Mithun Chakraborty		
2011	Abhisandhi	Tarun Chattopadhyay			
2011	Bedeni	Anjan Das			
2011	Jiyo Kaka	Parambrata Chatterjee			
2011	Necklace				
2011	Punarutthan	Hrishi Mukherjee	Priyanshu Chatterjee		
2012	3 Kanya	Agnidev Chatterjee			
2012	Charulata 2011	Agnidev Chatterjee			
2012	Muktodhara	Shibprasad Mukhopadhyay and Nandita Roy			
2012	Om Shanti	Satabdi Roy	Tapas Paul		
2013	A Political Murder	Agnidev Chatterjee			
2013	Alik Sukh	Shiboprosad Mukherjee and Nandita Roy	Debshankar Haldar		
2013	Maati Amar Maa	Dulal Dey	Rachna Banerjee		
2013	Mrs. Sen	Agnidev Chatterjee			
2013	Villain	Tota Roy Chowdhury			
2014	Parapaar	Sanjoy Nag			
2014	Sondhey Naamar Aagey	Rhitobrata Bhattacharya	Arijit Dutt		
2014	Teenkahon	Bauddhayan Mukherji			
2014	Taan	Mukul Roy Chowdhury			
2015	Ek Cup Cha	Noyeem Imtiaz Neyamul	Ferdous, Moushumi	Guest Appearance	
2015	Bela Seshe	Shiboprosad Mukherjee and Nandita Roy	Soumitra Chatterjee		
2015	Rajkahini	Srijit Mukherji	Jaya Ahsan	Won Tele Cine award for Best Actress	
2015	Tadanto	Nitish Roy			
2016	Aagun Pakhi	Subhrajit Mitra	Sabyasachi Chakraborty		
2016	Praktan	Shiboprosad Mukherjee and Nandita Roy	Prosenjit Chatterjee	Won Filmfare Award for Best Actress (Critics)	
2016	Mahanayika	Saikat Bhakat	Indraneil Sengupta		
2016	Maya Mridanga	Raja Sen	Debshankar Haldar		
2016	Rater Rojonigondha	Anup Sengupta			
2016	Teenanko				
2018	Colours of Life	Prakash Bharadwaj	Priyanshu Chatterjee		
2018	Damini	Riingo Banerjee			
2018	Gaheen Hriday	Sohini			
2018	Drishtikone	Kaushik Ganguly	Prosenjit Chatterjee		
2018	Ekti Cinemar Golpo	Alamgir	Arifin Shuvoo, Alamgir	Bangladeshi Film	
2018	Rongberonger Korhi	Ranjan Ghosh			
2019	Mukherjee Dar Bou				
2019	Shah Jahan Regency				
2019	Ahaa Re	Ranjan Ghosh	Arifin Shuvoo	Bangladeshi Film	
2019	Atithi	Sujit Paul			
2019	Lime n Light	Reshmi Mitra			
2020	Bidrohini	Sandip Chowdhury			
2020	The Parcel	Indrasis acharya	Saswata Chatterjee		
2022	Kishmish	Rahool Mukherjee	—	Guest appearance	
2022	Bela Shuru	Shiboprosad Mukherjee and Nandita Roy	Soumitra Chatterjee		
2022	Mahishasur Marddini	Ranjan Ghosh	Saswata Chatterjee, Parambrata Chattopadhyay		
2022	Neel Doriyar Majhi	Panna Hossain			
2022	Prosenjit Weds Rituparna	Samrat Sharma	Prosenjit Chatterjee	Releasing on 25 November	
2023	Maayakumari	Arindam Sil	Abir Chatterjee		
2023	Datta	Nirmal Chakraborty			
2024	Dabaru	Pathikrit Basu			
2024	Ajogyo	Kaushik Ganguly	Prosenjit Chatterjee		
2024	Amar Labangalata	Bappaditya Bandyopadhyay			
2025	Puratawn	Suman Ghosh	Sharmila Tagore, Indraneil Sengupta	Comeback of Sharmila Tagore in Bengali cinema.	
2025	Madam Sengupta	Sayantan Ghosal	Rahul Bose, Ananya Chatterjee		
2025	Bela	Anilavaa Chatterjee	Biswajit Chakraborty		
	Chhuti †	Murari Mohan Rakshit	Saswata Chatterjee		
	Sporsho †	Anonno Mamun and Abhinondon Dutt	Nirob	Indo-Bangladesh joint production film	
	Jam †	Noyeem Imtiaz Neyamul	Ferdous, Purnima, Arifin Shuvoo		
	Gangchil †	Noyeem Imtiaz Neyamul	Ferdous, Purnima		
	Agnibina †	Shamim Ahamed Roni			
	Zokhom †	Apurba Rana			
	Chhoto Maa †	Jakir Hossain Raju			

== Hindi films ==
Key
†	Denotes films that have not yet been released

Year	Title	Director	Co-actor	Note	Ref.
1994	Teesra Kaun?	Partho Ghosh	Chunkey Pandey	Bollywood debut	
1995	Mohini	Hema Malini		Telefilm	
1995	Zakhmi Sipahi	T L V Prasad	Mithun Chakraborty		
1997	Daadagiri	Arshad Khan	Mithun Chakraborty		
1998	Aakrosh	Ramesh J. Sharma			
2000	Kaali Topi Laal Rumaal	B. Vijay Reddy	Mithun Chakraborty		
2002	Sabse Badkar Hum	K. Ravi	Mithun Chakraborty		
2005	Main, Meri Patni Aur Woh	Chandan Arora	Rajpal Yadav		
2005	Swirl	Sreejith Karanavar		Short film	
2006	Unns	Bhupender Gupta	Sanjay Kapoor Sudhanshu Pandey		
2007	Gauri: The Unborn	Akku Akbar	Atul Kulkarni		
2008	Sirf	Rajaatesh Nayar	Parvin Dabas		
2009	Do Knot Disturb	David Dhawan	Ritesh Deshmukh		
2009	Fox	Deepak Tijori	Sunny Deol		
2009	Love Khichdi	Sharmista Basu	Randeep Hooda		
2009	S.R.K	Ajoy Varma			
2010	...And Once Again	Amol Palekar			
2010	Bumm Bumm Bole	Priyadarshan			
2010	Dunno Y... Na Jaane Kyon	Sanjay Sharma			
2010	Life Express	Anup Das			
2010	Main Osama	Faisal Saif			
2010	Mittal v/s Mittal	Karan Razdan	Rohit Roy		
2011	Aagaah: The Warning	Karan Razdan	Atul Kulkarni		
2011	Bas Ek Tamanna	Rahul Kapoor			
2011	Dil Toh Baccha Hai Ji	Madhur Bhandarkar	Ajay Devgn		
2011	Mad — It Can't Be Anyone	Prakash Jaiswal			
2012	Aalaap	Manish Manikpuri			
2012	Overtime	Ajay Yadav			
2013	Calapor	Dinesh P. Bhonsle	Priyanshu Chatterjee		
2014	Kolkata Junction	Anjan Dutt	Kay Kay Menon		
2015	Extraordinaari	Sunanda Shyamal Mitra	Shahbaz Khan		
2016	Six X	Chandrakant Singh	Aasif Sheikh		
2017	Main Khudiram Bose Hun	Manoj Giri			
2021	Bansuri: The Flute	Hari Viswanath			
2023	Hum Tumhe Chahte Hai	Rajann Lyallppuri	Janmejaya Singh		
2024	Political War	Mukesh Modi			
2025	Kaal Trighori	Nitin Vaidya	Arbaaz Khan		

== Odia films ==
Year	Title	Director	Co-actor	Note	Ref.
1991	Kotia Manish Gotiye Jaga	Vijay Bhaskar	Bijay Mohanty	Credited as Chumki	
1993	Bhagya Hate Dori		Bijoy Mohanty		
1994	Gopa Re Badhhuchhi Kala Kanhei	Sadhu Meher			
2003	Katha Deithili Maa Ku	Himanshu Parija	Siddhanta Mahapatra		

== Other language films ==
Year	Title	Director	Co-actor	Language	Notes	Ref.
1995	Ghatotkachudu	S. V. Krishna Reddy		Telugu	Special appearance	
1996	Karnataka Suputra	Vijay	Vishnuvardhan	Kannada		
2013	Kathaveedu	Sohanlal		Malayalam		

== Music video ==
Year	Title	Note	Ref.
2017	Dekha Hobe Ei Banglay		

== Reality Shows ==
Year	Title	Season	Role	Ref.
2016	Home Minister Bouma	1	Anchor	

=== Mahalaya ===
Year	Title	Role	Channel	Note	Ref.
2022	Devi Dasomahabidya	Devi Parvati and Devi Mahisasuramardini	Colors Bangla		
