= Probhu Nosto Hoi Jai =

- English: Lord, I Am Rotting Away
- Directed by: Agnidev Chatterjee
- Release date: 2007
- Country: India
- Language: Bengali

Prabhu Nosto Ho Jai (English: Lord, I Am Rotting Away) is a 2007 Indian Bengali film directed and produced by Agnidev Chatterjee. The entire movie was shot in a black and white setting. The story revolves around four individuals struggling to attain emotional stability. The duration of the movie is approximately 90 minutes. The story was written by Amitabha Chatterjee. The film stars Kunal Mitra as Anupam Chaudhury, father of Jhilmil Chaudhury who is played by Ananya Chatterjee. Anupam's wife, Aaloklata Chaudhury, is played by Locket Chatterjee. Jhilmil's friend, Maitrayee is played by Arunima Ghosh and Moinak Mitra is played by Kaushik Sen. This movie was premiered at the Kolkata Film Festival and was later on screened at the Kerala Film Festival. Because of the sexual nature of its content, this movie is said to possess similarities with another film of Agnidev's known as Charuulata 2011

== Summary ==
The story revolves around a married couple where the husband Anupam Chaudhury has a love for writing poems and novels. He, however, never published any work under his own name and uses his wife's name instead, Aaloklata Chaudhury, to publish his work. His wife gets so caught up in the fame that she starts to take her husband for granted and mistreats him over the years; thus, gradually their marriage descends into misery which leads to Aaloklata having multiple sexual partners. Their daughter, Jhilmil Chaudhury, is brought up in this unhealthy and emotionally strained environment which leads to her having a detached relationship with her father and her mother. Jhilmil's close friend and confidante, Maithrayee, begins to visit her often and gets acquainted to her father whom she falls in love with later on.

== Plot ==
The movie in its entirety is shot in retrospect with the father, Anupam Chaudhury, being placed at the beginning of the movie to talk about his intense and sexual relationship with Maithrayee, his daughter Jhilmil's friend. The scene then switches to the event that Anupam was talking about where Maithrayee is getting intimate with him in his bedroom and Maithrayee revealing that she came from a divorced family and that she has a strained relationship with her mother. As they get intimate, Maithrayee says that she is in love with him and begs him to love her back. Maithrayee also confronts Anupam about him being the ghost writer for his wife, Aaloklata's novels and poems and questions the reason behind choosing to do so. As the movie progresses, Maithrayee confesses that she presumed Anupam to be the cook of the household when she had made a move on him but continued to indulge even after she discovered that he's Jhilmil's father.

Meanwhile, Aaloklata receives a call from one of her publishers and is asked to write a novel that should be explicit and raw, unlike her previous novels that are poetic and conventional in nature. When Aaloklata brought this up with her husband, he refused to write such a novel. Driven by anger, Aaloklata informs her husband the next day that she would be inviting one of the publishers, Moinak Mitra from Mitra and Ghosh Publishers, for dinner and drinks. After dinner, she gets Moinak drunk and insisted that he spend the night and ordered Anupam to get the guest room ready. After Moinak retired to his room, Aaloklata sneaked in later at night and slept with him. The following morning when Anupam entered his room with tea and biscuits, a guilt-ridden Moinak could not tolerate Anupam's unconditional hospitality and indirectly confessed what he did to Anupam. Completely unperturbed after listening to everything, Anupam asked him to get ready for breakfast before he decided to leave.

The plot intensifies as Jhilmil tells Maithrayee that she is four months pregnant and that her political science professor, Dr. Suprathik Dhar who is married with children, is the father. Maithrayee then suggests an abortion but Jhilmil refuses to get one done because it is her first baby and she wishes to keep it. Maithrayee urges Jhilmil to discuss with her parents about the matter. Maithrayee, in turn, reveals about her feelings towards Jhilmil's father to Jhilmil and tells her that she has fallen in love with him. Jhilmil's reaction is one of shock which later transcends to acceptance. As Jhilmil anticipated, her mother, Aaloklata, does not take it well when she told her about the pregnancy and Jhilmil's mother tells her that she needs to get the baby aborted since she cannot afford to have her name tarnished because of such a scandal. Jhilmil refuses and they get into an argument. On the contrary, when Jhilmil and Maithrayee approached Anupam about the issue, he simply offered his support and said that Jhilmil will have to be a single parent but he wouldn't abandon her side. Jhilmil, surprised and happy at the reassurance, mentioned to him that Maithrayee is in love with him and then exits the room to give them privacy.

The plot further intensifies as Anupam ends up inadvertently strangling Maithrayee while intimate and because they were so caught up in the act, Anupam realised only much later on that Maithrayee is no longer breathing. The scene changes to him covering her body and proceeding to sit on the ground and play the Sitar. The movie ends with Jhilmil speaking to the screen, in retrospect, of all the events that took place and mentions that after Maithrayee's death, Anupam was taken to prison where he continued to write endlessly and that Aaloklata was still suffering and living her life. The film ended with her also mentioning that she is 7 months pregnant and that she intends on giving birth to her child and that Maithrayee was a valuable part of her life.

== Cast ==
- Kunal Mitra
- Arunima Ghosh
- Ananya Chatterjee
- Locket Chatterjee
- Kaushik Sen
