= Mahishasur Marddini =

Indian feature film released in 2022

- Mahishasur Marddini Movie Poster
- Directed by: Ranjan Ghosh
- Written by: Ranjan Ghosh
- Produced by: Pawan Kanodia
- Starring: Rituparna Sengupta; Saswata Chatterjee; Parambrata Chattopadhyay; Koushik Kar; Saheb Bhattacharya; Poulomi Das; Sritama Dey; Aryuun Ghosh; Arunima Halder; Abhyuday Dey
- Cinematography: Subhadeep Dey
- Edited by: Amit Pal
- Music by: Avijit Kundu
- Distributed by: RAA Info and Entertainments
- Release date: November 25, 2022 (India)
- Running time: 126 minutes
- Country: India
- Language: Bengali

Mahishasur Marddini – A Night to Remember (মহিষাসুরমর্দ্দিনী) is a 2022 India-Bengali film written and directed by acclaimed director Ranjan Ghosh. It stars Rituparna Sengupta, Saswata Chatterjee and Parambrata Chattopadhyay, and is considered as the director's boldest work till date in which he experiments with form and style, combining the elements of theatre and cinema. The film was produced by AVA Film Productions Pvt. Ltd. and co-produced by Vinayak Pictures.

The film was nominated in a list of Top 50 Indian Feature Films by FIPRESCI-India for their annual jury Award, the Grand Prix 2022.

The film was screened at the Film and Television Institute of India, Jawaharlal Nehru University, Jamia Millia Islamia, University of Hyderabad, English and Foreign Languages University, University of Kerala, SNDT Women's University, Pondicherry University, IIT Bombay (Indian Institute of Technology - Bombay), Indian Institute of Science Education and Research, Kolkata and Tata Institute of Social Sciences.

The Indian People's Theatre Association, Kollam District Committee, Kerala, screened the film in August 2023. Earlier, it was screened at one of the oldest and most prestigious theatre festivals in India, the 21st IHC Theatre Festival, organized by the India Habitat Centre, New Delhi, in September 2022. With that, it became the first Indian feature film to be screened at any theatre festival anywhere in India.

== Theme ==
The film is a single-night, single-location intersectional bundle of tales about guilt-ridden memories, fake appearances of nobility that human beings put on, and how these appearances eventually crumble. Mahishasur Marddini creates a bleak and haunting world that evokes shame and leaves the audience bruised. Mahishasur Marddini is a letter of protest as also an apology to women for the wrongs done to her through the ages that continue even to this day.

It avoids a mechanical plot and the causality of usual plot-driven stories, and is presented in the form of a seven-act play bringing together a collage of moments to establish the idea of a nightmarish world for women. The film explores both the Indian theatre tradition and the Indian aesthetic of cinema by experimenting with the formal elements of both the artforms. The entries and exits of characters, the performances, the dialogues and discourses, the staging and blocking, the use of props, the lighting and shot-taking are all arranged to creatively combine the language of film and the formal elements of theatre.

== Cast ==
- Rituparna Sengupta as Land-lady, Air Force Test Pilot
- Saswata Chatterjee as Ruling Party Politician
- Parambrata Chattopadhyay as Election Strategist
- Koushik Kar as Local Businessman
- Saheb Bhattacharya as Army Major
- Poulomi Das as Army Major's wife, School Teacher
- Sritama Dey as College-going Tenant 1
- Aryuun Ghosh as College-going Tenant 2
- Arunima Halder as College-going Tenant 3
- Abhyuday Dey as College-going Tenant 4
- Pankaj Munshi as Chief Potter
- Bimal Giri as Assistant Potter 1
- Arijit Lahiri as Assistant Potter 2
- Pawan Kanodia as NGO Owner
- Tamal Roy Chowdhury as Mansion Owner

== Scripting and pre-production ==
In an interview, director Ranjan Ghosh had said that the infamous Nirbhaya (2012 Delhi gang rape and murder) incident was the origin of the story. It took him nearly ten years to take notes from his life and his surroundings and form the story, before penning the screenplay. The final draft of the screenplay got ready in 2020 before going into production in 2021.

Pre-production happened over a period of four months from October 2020 till January 2021. The team scouted for an old mansion where the entire story would be set. Extensive recce was done in and around Kolkata before zeroing on an old mansion in Chinsura, a suburb in the Hooghly district of Bengal.

In another interview the director had said that he had done a detailed shot-breakdown of the script along with his cinematographer Subhadeep Dey for over 25 days, in order to shoot the film in just over two weeks, because of budget constraints.

== Principal photography and post-production ==
The film was shot on the ALEXA MINI Camera by cinematographer Subhadeep Dey, an alumnus of the Film and Television Institute of India, and who had earlier shot films like Rajlokkhi o Srikanta and Reunion among others. The first day of the shoot was on 2 February 2021. The film was shot over a period of 15 days. The shoot schedule was hampered because of the second wave of the COVID-19 pandemic. This resulted in a delay of over six months, and the shoot was completed only in August 2021.

The film was edited by Amit Pal who had earlier edited the Festival version of Ghosh's acclaimed food film Ahaa Re. The music production was done by newbie music director Avijit Kundu.

== Film Festival Participation, Release and Critical Response ==
Mahishasur Marddini had a limited theatrical release in Kolkata owing to its experimental format. Reportedly, the audience were disturbed by the dark theme of the film. The film had a total run of 50 days in the city and the suburbs. The film received mostly positive reviews from critics across the country. After its screening in the Asian Cinema Competition section of the 13th Bengaluru International Film Festival, 2022, NDTV critic Saibal Chatterjee wrote that "Mahishasur Marddini is an important film that stares at the rot in the soul of India in the face." He pointed out the director's attempt to "piece together stories of gender discrimination and sexual violence to reveal the sheer gravity of the situation on the ground." and "the unusual feel and texture of the film that combines the grammar of cinema, the methods of proscenium theatre and the interpretative tools of socio-political observation." He commented that the film "succeeds to a great extent while crafting a hard-hitting cautionary narrative." In a critical reading of the film for their magazine E-CineIndia, film historian Dr. Debjani Halder of FIPRESCI-India talked about the "depiction of the politics of patriarchal ideas of imposing the image of a mother goddess on women, a veiled form of exercising male authority." She said, "the gallery is used as a picture frame stage" and the action is observed "through the proscenium arch." She commented on Subhadeep Dey's cinematography and PV Manikumar's colour-correction for creating "a magical visual construction", while adding that editor Amit Pal's edit "improvising the concept of time and space has included a poetic grace to the entire narrative." Senior critic S. Vishwanath gave the film a 4*/5 rating on High on Films. He wrote "Ghosh holds a mirror to the maleficent society" and also exposes "how society remains unconcerned to the untold sufferings of the women." To that end, "Ghosh takes to the theatrical format for his searing and soul searching tale." The film was screened at the 22nd New York Indian Film Festival, 2022. US-based author and indie-film curator Kalpa Shah-Maniar rated the film 4*/5 in the journal, Cinematic Illusions, and wrote that "Mahishasur Marddini is a strongly relevant film with an urgent drama." She further commented on the "consistent performances" by the lead actors Rituparna Sengupta, Saswata Chatterjee, Parambrata Chattopadhyay and the newcomers Abhyuday Dey, Arunima Halder, Sritama Dey, and debutant Aryuun Ghosh. In The Citizen, Critic Shoma A. Chatterji reviewed that "Mahishasura Marddini has attempted an experiment in creating an innovative form of blending a theatrical performance with a full-length feature film." She wrote that the director had tried to "revolutionize how we talk about theatre as not only a medium of words, but that of fully realized productions with visual cues." In her view, the film "offers a classic example of this experiment."

== Film Academia and Legacy ==
Mahishasur Marddini was screened at one of the oldest and most prestigious theatre festivals in India, the 21st IHC Theatre Festival, organized by the India Habitat Centre, New Delhi, in September 2022. With that, it became the first Indian feature film to be screened at any theatre festival anywhere in India. The IHC authorities had said about the selection that "the idea behind this was to make people think about theatre, even though they had not come to watch a play.” The festival took that idea forward with a screening of director Ranjan Ghosh's Bengali film Mahishasur Marddini, followed by a panel discussion on how the movie successfully combined the elements of both the artforms. Actress Rituparna Sengupta, who played the protagonist of the film, said in an interview that it was "a pathbreaking moment in Indian cinema that a feature film that experimented with form and style got selected at such a prestigious theatre festival. The selection validated the team's efforts."

The film became a part of cinema academia because of its experimentation with form, style and narrative. The Indian People's Theatre Association, Kollam District Committee, Kerala, screened the film in August 2023. It was further screened at the Film and Television Institute of India, Jawaharlal Nehru University, Jamia Millia Islamia, University of Hyderabad, English and Foreign Languages University, University of Kerala, SNDT Women's University, Pondicherry University, IIT Bombay (Indian Institute of Technology - Bombay), Indian Institute of Science Education and Research, Kolkata and Tata Institute of Social Sciences. In an interview, the director had mentioned that at all those screenings, the film was received with an enthusiasm by the scholars. It got a standing ovation in Pondicherry after the screening.

== Soundtrack ==
The soundtrack has music composed by Avijit Kundu, who had also scored the background music of the film. The songs were sung by debutant singers Madhuri Dey and Arpita Sarkar. The music was released on 8 November 2022.

No.	Title	Lyrics	Performer(s)	Length
1.	"Aami Mahishasur Marddini"	Subhadeep Kantal	Madhuri Dey	3:07
2.	"Shono Shonai"	Subhadeep Kantal	Arpita Sarkar	3:48
