= Unnati Davara =

Indian model and actress

- Born: Raipur, Chhattisgarh, India
- Occupations: Model, actress
- Known for: Femina Miss India East 2010 winner

Unnati Davara is an Indian beauty pageant contestant, model and actress. In 2010 she won Femina Miss India East title.

== Biography ==
Davara started her career with Femina Miss India 2010, Davara won Femina Miss India East title and became one of the top 10 finalists. During the pageant she also won two sub-titles; Miss Vivacious and Miss Talented.

In 2012 she debuted in acting with a Bengali film named Teen Kanya. The film was directed by Agnidev Chatterjee.

== Filmography ==
Year	Film	Director	Character
2012	Teen Kanya	Agnidev Chatterjee	Damini
2014	Yoddha	Mandeep Benipal	Navdeep
2019	Manikarnika: The Queen of Jhansi	Krish (director)	Munder

== Television ==
Year	Show	Comments
2016	Darr Sabko Lagta Hai	Episode forty one

== Awards ==
- 2010: Pantaloons Femina Miss India East
