= Mohomaya =

Bengali web series

- Release poster
- Genre: Psychological Thriller
- Created by: Sahana Dutta
- Directed by: Kamaleswar Mukherjee
- Country of origin: India
- Original language: Bengali
- No. of seasons: 2
- No. of episodes: 10

Production
- Production company: Missing Screw

Original release
- Release: 26 March – 21 May 2021

Mohomaya is a Bengali web series directed by Kamaleswar Mukherjee. The series started streaming on the Bengali OTT platform Hoichoi. The series featuring Swastika Mukherjee, Ananya Chatterjee and Bipul Patra in the lead roles.

== Plot ==
Rishi whose past is deep ocean of secrets revolving around his deceased mother, Maya. When he meets Aruna, his classmate's mother, Rishi finds the affection he longed for all his life. What initiates as a motherlike bonding soon turns to a compulsive obsession destructing the lives of a perfectly normal family.

== Cast ==
- Swastika Mukherjee as Aruna
- Ananya Chatterjee as Maya
- Bipul Patra as Rishi
  - Ankit Majumder as younger Rishi (Papan)
- Sujan Mukherjee as Suranjan
- Arunava Dey as Miki
- Shweta Chaudhuri as Mithi

== Production ==
With Mohomaya, Kamaleswar Mukherjee made his digital debut. On 3 March hoichoi released the teaser of the series. With the spellbinding soundtrack, instantly draws audience into the story, leaving them with much anticipation.

== Overview ==
Season	Episodes	Originally released
1	5	March 26, 2021
2	5	May 21, 2021

== Season 1 (2021) ==
On 26 March 2021, hoichoi released the complete series with five episodes.

=== Episodes ===
No.	Title	Directed by	Original release date
1	"Toe Ring"	Kamaleswar Mukherjee	26 March 2021
2	"Bhogoban kotha sone na"	Kamaleswar Mukherjee	26 March 2021
3	"Jhumjhumi"	Kamaleswar Mukherjee	26 March 2021
4	"Mrito Jonaki"	Kamaleswar Mukherjee	26 March 2021
5	"Achin Pakhi"	Kamaleswar Mukherjee	26 March 2021

== Season 2 (2021) ==
On 21 May 2021 hoichoi released the part 2 of the series with brand new five episodes.

=== Episodes ===
No.	Title	Directed by	Original release date
1	"Nirbak"	Kamaleswar Mukherjee	21 May 2021
2	"Khorosrota"	Kamaleswar Mukherjee	21 May 2021
3	"Aalta"	Kamaleswar Mukherjee	21 May 2021
4	"Pother Kaanta"	Kamaleswar Mukherjee	21 May 2021
5	"Shesh Drishyo"	Kamaleswar Mukherjee	21 May 2021
