= Mayookh Bhaumik =

American-born Indian classical musician and composer

- Born: New York City, U.S.
- Genres: Indian classical music, EDM, fusion
- Occupations: Musician, composer, producer
- Instruments: Tabla, mridangam, synthesizers
- Years active: 1990s–present
- Awards: National Film Award for Best Music Direction (2012)

Mayookh Bhaumik is an American-born Indian classical musician, composer, and producer. He is known for blending traditional Indian percussion with electronic music and film scores. Bhaumik has performed as a tabla player at various Indian classical music conferences and was the first American-born musician to be featured in several of these venues.

== Early life and education ==
Bhaumik was born in New York. Identified as a child prodigy at the age of three by Ali Akbar Khan, he began training in Hindustani classical music and Carnatic music under Jnan Prakash Ghosh, Sabir Khan, and Zakir Hussain. He also studied the mridangam under Vidwan S. Sekhar and learned Kathak accompaniment from Birju Maharaj.

== Career ==
Bhaumik has performed as an accompanist for several Indian classical and Sufi musicians, including Vilayat Khan, Jasraj, and Nusrat Fateh Ali Khan. He is a regular performer at the Saptak Festival of Music and other major international stages such as the Montreal Jazz Festival.

Bhaumik's work in electronic music involves the integration of Indian classical elements with drum and bass, ambient music, and EDM. He founded the fusion ensemble Black Coffee, which explores these genres. His production style frequently incorporates live looping and synthesized soundscapes layered over traditional tabla talas.

=== Film scoring ===
As a film composer, Bhaumik has scored over 40 films. In 2012, he became the first composer in the history of Bengali cinema to win the National Film Award for Best Original Score for the film Laptop.

== Selected filmography ==
Year	Film	Language	Notes
2009	Dwando	Bengali	
2012	Laptop	Bengali	Won National Film Award
2014	Hrid Majharey	Bengali	
2014	Take One	Bengali	
2022	Bhotbhoti	Bengali	

== Awards ==
- National Film Award for Best Music Direction (Background Score) for Laptop (2012).
- SXSW "Uniquely South Asian Award" (2023) for contributions to the South Asian Diaspora.
