= Ahaa Re =

2019 film by Ranjan Ghosh

- Ahaa Re Movie Poster
- Directed by: Ranjan Ghosh
- Written by: Ranjan Ghosh
- Produced by: Rituparna Sengupta
- Starring: Arifin Shuvoo; Rituparna Sengupta; Amrita Chattopadhyay; Paran Bandopadhyay; Deepankar De; Shakuntala Barua; Bhaswar Chatterjee; Shubhro Sankha Das; Anuvab Pal; Alamgir
- Cinematography: Hari Nair
- Edited by: Rabiranjan Maitra
- Music by: Savvy
- Production company: Bhavna-Aaj-O-Kal
- Distributed by: SSR Cinemas P Ltd
- Release date: 22 February 2019
- Country: India
- Language: Bengali

Ahaa Re is a 2019 Indian drama film written and directed by Ranjan Ghosh. It is the third feature film by the director known for his earlier works Hrid Majharey and Rongberonger Korhi. It features Bangladeshi actor Arifin Shuvoo (in his debut in Indian film), Rituparna Sengupta, Amrita Chattopadhyay, Paran Bandopadhyay, Deepankar De, Shakuntala Barua, and Bangladeshi film actor Alamgir in a special appearance as a restaurant owner. The film is produced by Rituparna Sengupta under her own production banner of Bhavna Aj O Kal.

== Plot ==
Farhaz Chowdhury, a top chef from Dhaka, first falls in love with her cooking and then with Basundhara — a woman who runs a home catering service.

== Cast ==
- Arifin Shuvoo as Farhaz Chowdhury / Raja
- Rituparna Sengupta as Basundhara
- Amrita Chattopadhyay as Shahida, Farhaz's girlfriend
- Paran Bandopadhyay as Atanu Ganguly, Basundhara's father-in-law
- Deepankar De as Abhijit Sen, Farhaz's stepfather
- Shakuntala Barua as Debjani Sen, Farhaz's mother
- Bhaswar Chatterjee as Shomu, Basundhara's Dead Husband.
- Shubhro Sankha Das as Bappa, Basundhara's brother-in-law
- Anuvab Pal as Kamaljeet, Farhaz's friend
- Alamgir as Restaurant Owner

== Production ==
The filming officially began at mid 2018 in Kolkata.

== Costume design and Make-up ==
The film's costumes were designed by Shreyasi Bose. Make-up artists for Rituparna Sengupta were Anup Malakar, Malati Das and Shandha Poddar. Shumon Shaha did the make-up for Arifin Shuvoo. Kishore Das was the make-up artist for the rest of the actors.

== Soundtrack ==
Ahaa Re

Soundtrack album by Ishan Mitra, Arko Mukherjee, Somlata,
- Released: 2019
- Genre: Soundtrack
- Label: Zee Music Bangla
- Producer: Savvy

The soundtrack of Ahaa Re was composed by Savvy.

=== Track listing ===
| No. | Title | Lyrics | Music | Singer(s) | Length |
|---|---|---|---|---|---|
| 1. | "Icchera" | Subhadeep Kantal | Savvy | Ishan Mitra | 3:43 |
| 2. | "Ki Jala" | Ashkor Ali Pandit | Savvy | Arko Mukherjee | 3:52 |
| 3. | "Aay Beheste Ke Jabi Aay" | Kazi Nazrul Islam | Savvy | Somlata Acharya Chowdhury | 4:15 |

== Release ==
The film was released in India on 22 February 2019.

== Reception ==
The movie received positive reviews from critics who mostly praised the acting performances, particularly Rituparna Senguptas portrayal. Thirdadvantagepoint.com listed her performance as the third best performance of the entire year. It was also listed as one of the best performances of the decade. The Times of India wrote in their review, "Another powerful performance comes from the usual suspect, Paran Bandopadhyay, who not only excels at drawing out guffaws, but also touches a chord somewhere by drawing on the inherent maturity of his character to deliver some really touching lines. Subhro's performance, too, manages to linger on in your memory long after the screening gets over. Amrita, who plays Farhaz's Dhaka girlfriend, also does justice to her role despite a short screen time. But Rituparna gives Arifin and Paran Bandopadhyay a run for their money with her mature, measured performance as Basundhara — a woman whose past grief pushes her to put her heart and soul into cooking and caring for her family of three. Bhaskar Chattophadhyay from Firstpost wrote in his review: "Sometimes, even the simplest of stories, if told well, can touch your heart. Filmmaker Ranjan Ghosh's third feature film Ahaa Re is a fine instance of that fact. It's not that Ghosh is telling us a story we haven't heard before. But the way it is told, the setting on which he mounts the tale, and the potent, brilliant, and yet, remarkably restrained performances by his actors are only some of the things that successfully set the film aside as one of the best that I have seen this year so far. Rituparna Sengupta is a treat to watch in this film. You have to see Sengupta in Ahaa Re to believe how much this is true. Every single frame of her cooking a dish, or even preparing to do so, is filled with so much love. Almost as if she is in a silent worship. Love, nourishment, gentleness, fondness – she defines these words with her performance. Her Basundhara is a woman who does not wear her emotions on her sleeves, but there is a scene towards the end of the film, when she can't take it anymore and just breaks down. Keep your handkerchiefs ready.

== Awards and nominations ==
The movie was screened at the New York Indian Film Festival which was held virtually due to the COVID-19 Pandemic. Rituparna Sengupta was nominated for Best Actress.
