= Ke Tumi =

- Directed by: Prasun Banerjee
- Produced by: Prasun Bandyopadhyay
- Starring: Biswajit; Tapas Paul; Rituparna Sengupta
- Release date: 12 September 2008
- Country: India
- Language: Bengali

Ke Tumi (Bengali: কে তুমি "Who are you") is a 2008 Bengali film directed by Prasun Banerjee. It stars Biswajit, Tapas Paul and Rituparna Sengupta.

== Plot ==
Rajesh is a teacher. His wife Shila is killed while driving as she gets involved in an accident. After cremating her, Rajesh comes back home and is told by his maidservant who was very loyal to his wife that his wife had come home when he was away and she had just left before arriving. He is shocked to hear this as he had himself cremated her and identified her by what she was wearing and by certain marks on her body. Soon after, a look alike of Shila turns up at Rajesh's place and claims to be his wife. Rajesh refuses to believe her and informs the police about this imposter. She appears before Rajesh from time to time and he is highly disturbed. The police, who are also eager to solve the case, file a case against Shila. The public prosecutor appearing for the police and Rajesh is the father of Sumi, a student of Rajesh. The imposter turns out to be Capt. Choudhury, a lady officer of the army, a friend of Shila who had taken her test to catch the actual murderer. The murderer turn out to be Sumi, Rajesh's student who had paid certain people to eliminate Shila as she loved Rajesh and the latter kills herself when she learns that Rajesh does not love her.
