= Mama Bhagne (film) =

- Theatrical release poster
- Directed by: Anup Sengupta
- Written by: Manjil Bandyopadhyay
- Screenplay by: Manjil Bandyopadhyay
- Story by: Manjil Bandyopadhyay
- Produced by: Ishika Films Pvt. And Sujay Entertainment Digital Pvt.Ltd
- Starring: Prosenjit Chatterjee; Ananya Chatterjee; Ranjit Mallick; Arpita Mukherjee; Biswajit Chakraborty
- Cinematography: Badal Sarkar
- Edited by: Atish Dey Sarkar
- Music by: Subhayu Bedajna
- Distributed by: Moser Baer
- Release date: 18 September 2009
- Country: India
- Language: Bengali

Mama Bhagne (transl. Maternal uncle and the nephew) is a 2009 Bengali romantic comedy film directed by Anup Sengupta and produced under the banner of Ishika Films. The film features actors Prosenjit Chatterjee, Ranjit Mallick and Ananya Chatterjee in the lead roles. Music of the film has been composed by Subhayu Bedajna. It's an unofficial remake of the Hindi movie Rajaji.

== Plot ==
Raja and his Mama are very close friends. Raja decides to go Kolkata get a job producing fake certificates. He fall in love with Payel and marries her thinking that she is the daughter of millionaire.

== Cast ==
- Prosenjit Chatterjee as a Raja
- Ranjit Mallick as a Raja's Maternal Uncle
- Ananya Chatterjee as Payel
- Arpita Mukherjee as Payel Friend
- Biswajit Chakraborty as Payel's Father
- Raja Chattopadhyay as G.P.(Govinda Purakaysto)
- Shankar Chakraborty
