= Ranjan Ghosh =

Indian filmmaker and screenwriter

- Ranjan Ghosh at the Hrid Majharey premiere in Calcutta in 2014
- Born: Durgapur, West Bengal, India
- Occupations: Screenwriter; Director
- Years active: 2011 – present

Ranjan Ghosh (Bengali: রঞ্জন ঘোষ Rônjôn Ghosh) is an Indian filmmaker and screenwriter, known for his work in the Bengali cinema. He made his debut as a screenwriter in 2011, co-authoring Aparna Sen's Bengali feature film Iti Mrinalini. He made his directorial debut in 2014 with the critically acclaimed Hrid Majharey, a Bengali feature film starring Abir Chatterjee and Raima Sen. Inspired by certain iconic plays of William Shakespeare, it was presented as a tribute on his 450th Birth Anniversary.

His second film Rongberonger Korhi (2018) was an anthology of four short films woven around the theme of money and its relationship with human beings. It received critical acclaim in multiple film festivals.

In 2019, Ghosh released his third feature film Ahaa Re featuring Rituparna Sengupta and Arifin Shuvoo. Asian Movie Pulse listed the film among the 25 all-time great Asian films about food. Ghosh's fourth feature film Mahishasur Marddini - A Night to Remember featuring Rituparna Sengupta was released in 2022. The film was screened at the 21st Habitat Theatre Festival (2022) and Indian People's Theatre Association (2023). It became the first Indian feature film to be screened at any theatre festival in India.

== Early life ==
Brought up in a Bengali family in a satellite township in West Bengal, Ranjan Ghosh studied at St. Xavier's School, Durgapur, and at BC Institution. Thereafter, he moved to Calcutta to take up Physics at Jadavpur University but became a mariner after he received a degree in Nautical sciences from the University of Mumbai. In 2007, Ranjan left his job and joined the Mumbai-based film school Whistling Woods International Institute to study filmmaking. He graduated in 2009 with a major in screenwriting.

== Career ==
=== 2009–2014 ===
While still in his film school, Ranjan worked as a script assistant on the National Film Award winning 2009 Bengali film Antaheen. He later assisted the director Aniruddha Roy Chowdhury on the shoot of the same film.

After graduating in 2009, Ghosh made his screenwriting debut co-authoring the story and screenplay of Iti Mrinalini, a 2011 Bengali film directed by Aparna Sen. The screenplay was a professional assignment in the film school course syllabus. It was the first instance in India that any screenplay emerging from any Indian film institute was actually filmed.

Post Iti Mrinalini, Ghosh collaborated with Prakash Jha to make a loose adaptation of Jha's National Film Award winning 2003 Hindi film Gangaajal. The adapted story and screenplay, penned by Ghosh, was a comment on contemporary Bengal politics with the 1980 Bhagalpur blindings as the backdrop. But the film's production never started.

Ranjan Ghosh made his directorial debut with the critically acclaimed Abir Chatterjee-Raima Sen starrer Hrid Majharey in July, 2014. In 2013, it was filmed in the Andaman & Nicobar Islands. In 2014, it earned a place from "Film London" in its list of best films which are based on Shakespearean plays. The film and its screenplay were included in the UGC Literature Archive through the "Shakespeare in Bengal" project conducted by Jadavpur University.

In 2015, the film was screened at the New York University Tisch School of the Arts and was included in their PhD in Cinema Studies (Shakespeare and Indian Cinema). Also that year, the Oxford, Cambridge and RSA Examinations Board enlisted Hrid Majharey in "Additional References – World/International Adaptations of Othello" for their "A Level Drama and Theatre" course.

In April 2016, the film was featured in the "Bengali Shakespeares" Chapter at the "Indian Shakespeares on Screen", jointly held by the British Film Institute and The University of London in April 2016 in London to mark 400 years of the Shakespeare's demise.

In June 2021, Hrid Majharey became a part of the European Shakespeare Conference, organized by the European Shakespeare Research Association and the National and Kapodistrian University of Athens, Greece. In July 2021, it had a special screening at the 11th World Shakespeare Congress, held by the International Shakespeare Association and the National University of Singapore.

=== 2015–2019 ===
In 2016, Ghosh began the shoot of his second feature-length film Rongberonger Korhi. The first draft of the screenplay was written in 2015 and underwent rewrites till it went into production in September 2016. Initially, these were written as short film projects for the Satyajit Ray Film and Television Institute. Ghosh roped in Aparna Sen as the Creative Consultant on the film that was an anthology of four shorts. In 2017, Rongberonger Korhi was the only Bengali film that year, to be selected as a Market Recommended Film at the Dubai Film Market, in the 14th edition of the Dubai International Film Festival.

In 2018, the film was further screened at the 13th Habitat Film Festival organized by the India Habitat Centre in New Delhi. It won multiple awards including the Best Film (Critics), Best Director (Critics), Jury Special Mention and others at the Telangana Bengali Film Festival. It was screened at the Indian Vista section of the 17th Third Eye Asian Film Festival, Mumbai (2018). Next, the film was screened at the 9th Asian Film Festival in Pune. It was also selected in the "Chitrabharati Competition" section of the 11th Bengaluru International Film Festival (2019), organized by the Karnataka Chalanachitra Academy.

Ahaa Re (2019) starred Rituparna Sengupta and Arifin Shuvoo in the lead roles. It was featured in the "25 Great Asian Films about Food" by the Asian Movie Pulse. The film had won a Jury Special Mention at the Rainbow Film Festival in London and the Audience Choice Award at the Indian Film Festival in Boston. Ghosh was conferred the Best Director award for this film by the Satyajit Ray Film Society, Bengaluru. The film had been featured at international and Indian festivals across London, Kunming, Singapore, Melbourne, New York, Dallas, Boston, Cincinnati, Delhi, Mumbai, Pune, Bengaluru, Hyderabad, and Guwahati among others.

=== 2020–present ===
In April 2020, Ghosh planned to shoot his fourth feature film titled Mahishasur Marddini. Owing to the COVID-19 pandemic, the shoot was cancelled. The filming started in 2021 February and it was completed in August 2021.

The film was screened at the Film and Television Institute of India, Jawaharlal Nehru University, University of Hyderabad, English and Foreign Languages University, University of Kerala, SNDT Women's University, Pondicherry University, IIT Bombay, Indian Institute of Science Education and Research, Kolkata and Tata Institute of Social Sciences.

== Filmography ==
As Screenwriter and Directorial Assistant:

- Antaheen (2009) (scripting assistant)
- Iti Mrinalini (2011) (screenwriter and director's assistant)

As Screenwriter and Director:

Year	Film	Language	Credited as			Ref
Year	Film	Language	Director	Writer	Production Designer	Ref
2014	Hrid Majharey	Bengali	Yes	Yes	Yes	
2018	Rongberonger Korhi	Bengali	Yes	Yes	Yes	
2019	Ahaa Re	Bengali	Yes	Yes	Yes	
2022	Mahishasur Marddini - A Night to Remember	Bengali	Yes	Yes	Yes	
2026	Adamya	Bengali	Yes	Yes	Yes	
