= Mini (2022 film) =

2022 Indian Bengali film

- Release poster
- Directed by: Mainak Bhaumik
- Written by: Mainak Bhaumik and Aritra Sengupta
- Produced by: Rahul Bhanja and Sampurna Lahiri
- Starring: Kamalika Banerjee; Mimi Chakraborty; Mithu Chakraborty; Ayanna Chatterjee
- Cinematography: Pratip Mukherjee
- Music by: Subhadeep Mitra
- Release date: 6 May 2022
- Running time: 114 minutes
- Country: India
- Language: Bengali

Mini is a 2022 Bengali-language drama film directed by Mainak Bhaumik. The film is produced by Rahul Bhanja and Sampurna Lahiri. It stars Mimi Chakraborty, Kamalika Banerjee, and Ayanna Chatterjee in the lead roles. The film was released on 6 May 2022.

== Premise ==
When a young girl's mother falls ill and is admitted to a hospital due to some personal stress, her aunt takes care of her, and soon they develop a strong bond.

== Cast ==
As per the film's end credits:

- Kamalika Banerjee as Tanima, Mini's mother
- Mimi Chakraborty as Titli
- Mithu Chakraborty as Mini's grandmother
- Ayanna Chatterjee as Ritika aka Mini
- Saptarshi Maulik as Deep
- Rudrajit Mukherjee as Rano
- Jyotsna Majumder as Rekha
- Pinky Banerjee as Tumpa
- Apratim Chatterjee as Vishnu
- Sreya Bhattacharya as Richa, Titli's friend
- Senjuti Roy Mukherjee as Mini's Principal
- Dona Mondal as Riya
- Biswajit Ghosh as Som
- Sukanya Paul as Mini's classmate 1
- Sreekanya Dawn as Mini's classmate 2
- Swarit Singh as Sumant
- Ziniya Debnath as Roshni
- Sujata Ghosh as Minakshi
- Nabaneeta Basu Majumder as Mother of classmate 1
- Tanusree Dawn as Mother of classmate 2
- Riya Paul as Natasha
- Sanjay Guha as Doctor
- Chandan Banerjee as a shopkeeper
- Rishan Dhar as Pingu

== Soundtrack ==
Mini

Soundtrack album by Subhadeep Mitra
- Released: 2022
- Genre: Film soundtrack
- Length: 13:53
- Language: Bengali
- Label: Saregama Bengali

Track listing
No.	Title	Singer(s)	Length
1.	"Beshure"	Somlata Acharyya Chowdhury	2:51
2.	"Ador Obhiman"	Shaoni Mojumdar	4:00
3.	"Kotota Raat"	Lagnajita Chakraborty	3:45
4.	"Ei To Tomar"	Pritha Bhattacharya	3:17
Total length:			13:53

== Release ==
=== Theatrical ===
The trailer of the film was released on 8 April 2022. The film had its theatrical release on 6 May 2022.

=== Home media ===
The post-theatrical streaming rights of the film were bought by ZEE5 and the satellite rights of the film was bought by Zee Bangla and Zee Bangla Cinema. It premiered on ZEE5 on December 9, 2022.

== Reception ==
In The Times Of India, Jaya Biswas rated 3/5 as a positive review stating the film "Mini is a one-time watch keeping in mind the actors’ performances". Cinestaan gave it 2 star out of 5.
