= Rongberonger Korhi =

2017 Indian Bengali-language film

- Directed by: Ranjan Ghosh
- Written by: Ranjan Ghosh
- Produced by: Camellia Productions
- Starring: Rituparna Sengupta; Chiranjeet Chakraborty; Ritwick Chakraborty; Soham Chakraborty; Kharaj Mukherjee; Arunima Ghosh; Arjun Chakrabarty; Rwitobroto Mukherjee; Dhee Majumder
- Cinematography: Sirsha Ray
- Edited by: Rabiranjan Maitra
- Music by: Debojyoti Mishra
- Distributed by: Eros International
- Release dates: December 2017 (Dubai International Film Festival); 23 March 2018 (India)
- Running time: 132 minutes
- Country: India
- Language: Bengali

Rongberonger Korhi (transl. Colours of Money) is a 2017 India-Bengali film written and directed by noted Bengali filmmaker Ranjan Ghosh. It is the director's second film, following Hrid Majharey. It was produced by Rupa Datta of Camellia Productions.

Ghosh's mentor, Aparna Sen, was a creative consultant for the film. She reportedly liked the concept of the different colours of money and was impressed with the screenplay.

Rongberonger Korhi is an anthology of four short stories and the cast includes Rituparna Sengupta, Chiranjeet Chakraborty, Ritwick Chakraborty, Soham Chakraborty, Kharaj Mukherjee, Arunima Ghosh, Arjun Chakrabarty.

== Plot ==
The plot includes four short stories, each representing a different colour of money. The following synopsis is resourced from the Habitat Film Festival site.

== Cast ==
All the four stories have three principal characters.

First story

- Arunima Ghosh as Sitarani Murmu, a tribal woman
- Soham Chakraborty as Ramchandra Murmu, a tribal man
- Kharaj Mukherjee as Khagen Chandra Banerjee, a government clerk

Second story

- Arunima Ghosh as Manda, a young wife
- Chiranjeet Chakraborty as Bijoy, an aged husband
- Arjun Chakrabarty as Mithun, a young lover

Third story

- Rituparna Sengupta as an unnamed prostitute
- Ritwick Chakraborty as an unnamed client
- Dhee Majumder as an unnamed pimp

Fourth story

- Rituparna Sengupta as a mother
- Rwitobroto Mukherjee as her son Joga
- Durga idol

== Production ==
=== Development and pre-production ===
The first draft of the screenplay was written in 2015 and underwent rewrites till it went into production in September 2016. Initially, these were written as short film projects for the Satyajit Ray Film and Television Institute (SRFTI).

Pre-production spanned over three months from September 2016 till November 2016. Recce was carried out extensively in Kolkata and the suburbs and in the Burdwan and Birbhum districts for budget-friendly locations.

=== Filiming ===
The film was shot on the ARRI ALEXA MINI Camera by ace cinematographer Sirsha Ray. The first day of the shoot was on 10 December 2016. The film was shot over a period of 10 days, which the director later said he regretted. In interviews with The Statesman and The Moviean, he conceded that he would have preferred a two-week shoot.

== Controversy ==
=== Clash with Hindu Right Wing Group ===
In December 2017, a Hindu group protested against the film and called for its ban because, in one of the four stories, characters were named after Indian god and goddess, Ram and Sita. Activists frin the fringe group, Hindu Jagran Manch, held demonstrations outside the local office of the Central Board of Film Certification (CBFC) on Friday and requested changes in the names of the characters. Director Ranjan Ghosh refused to make any changes, calling the protests an attempt to curb his creative freedom. Ghosh said the film had four separate stories about relationships and there was no mythological connection. The spokesperson for the West Bengal unit of Hindu Jagran Manch, Vivek Singh, had written to the Union Information and Broadcasting minister, Smriti Irani, stating that naming the film’s characters after Ram and Sita would offend Hindus.

The BJP’s West Bengal unit president Dilip Ghosh said the trend of naming film characters after Hindu Gods or revered mythological characters might upset the community.

=== Support from the national and regional media ===
In the clash with the Hindu Right Wing Group, the national and regional media supported freedom of expression.

The Citizen asked "Did not Ram ask Sita to prove her chastity by passing through the fire? Did not Sita find absolution in finding her way back to the earth she sprung from? So, what is wrong if a film names its characters after mythological names? Don’t we name our own children after the names of mythological characters in the epics and after Gods and Goddesses of the Hindu pantheon like Ganesha, Sita, Radha, Krishna and the like? The first axe to fall would then be Mehboob’s classic Mother India where the “mother” in the title was named Radha. Ramesh Sippy’s bumper hit Seeta Aur Geeta should be recalled and renamed according to the wishes of this Right Wing group who have suddenly decided to become “censors beyond the censors.” Should we then, in retrospect, ask for a change in the names of all films where the characters are named after Gods and Goddesses of the Hindu pantheon and of Indian epics?"

Firstpost said "...religion is a low hanging fruit for all kinds of radicalism, and in the absence of any debate, dialogue or civil discussion whatsoever, the names of the film’s characters are being targeted. It is said that there are as many as thirty-three crore gods and goddesses in the Hindu religion. If one were to stop using their names in the arts and literature for fear of retaliation from such self-appointed sentinels of the religion, then there will be no artistic expression left in the country, and our great nation, which was once known all across the globe as an upholder of uninhibited creative freedom, will soon turn into a barren and dark desert of fear and subjugation."

The Indian Express reported the director's point of view that "“This entire thing is a cheap publicity gimmick by this fringe organisation, which wants to hog the limelight. It is piggybacking the film for publicity. It is an attempt to curb the creative freedom of artists,” he added. “It is a love story and there is an element of separation in the film. I will not change the name of my characters and there is a noble thought behind naming the characters. People will come to know about it after watching the film. It has not been done to hurt the sentiment of anyone. On the other hand, no one can dictate what people will be wearing and what they will eat. I will ask the CBFC not to pay heed to the demands of this organisation,” Ghosh said."

The Times of India wrote "When Ritwik Ghatak directed ‘Subarnarekha’, he cast Madhabi Mukherjee in the role of a girl called Sita. Born an orphan, Sita is brought up by her elder brother Ishwar. As the story unfolds, Sita is forced to take up prostitution. By a strange twist of fate, she is one day confronted by the reality of her drunk brother turning up at her brothel as her client. Before the release of this film in 1965, no one said that Ghatak was insulting Hindu sentiments. But 52 years later, the use of Sita’s name for a character played by Arunima Ghosh in Ranjan Ghosh’s ‘Rongberonger Korhi’ has angered the members of the Hindu Jagaran Manch. After verbal and email protests, members of this outfit are giving a deputation to the Central Board of Film Certification (CBFC)."

=== CBFC Certification ===
On 12 January 2018, the Central Board of Film Certification, Kolkata, passed the film without any cuts or modifications, rejecting the demands of Hindu Jagaran Manch. The director praised the CBFC for taking an objective view of the film without any bias and for not succumbing to any pressure. Film scholars also viewed this development as a very positive sign on the behalf of the CBFC.

== Release ==
=== Festival participation ===
Rongberonger Korhi was selected as a Market Recommended Film at the Dubai Film Market of the 14th edition of the Dubai International Film Festival, and was the only Bengali Film of 2017 to achieve. The festival was held from 6–13 December 2017, at Dubai, UAE.

The film was further screened on 26 May 2018, at the 13th edition of the Habitat Film Festival organized by the India Habitat Centre held from 19–27 May 2018 in New Delhi, India.

Rongberonger Korhi was screened at the Telangana International Bengali Film Festival held in Hyderabad between 7–9 December 2018. It won the Best Film (Critics), Best Director (Critics), Best Actor Female (Critics), Best Supporting Actor Male (Popular) and Jury Special Mention for Kharaj Mukherjee.

The film was selected in the Indian Vista section of the 17th Third Eye Asian Film Festival, Mumbai, 2018, between 14–20 December.

Next, the film was screened at the 9th Asian Film Festival, Pune, held at the National Film Archive of India from 24–30 December 2018. It was selected in the Indian Vista section.

Rongberonger Korhi was screened in the Cinema of the World section of the 17th Dhaka International Film Festival held between 10–18 January 2019, in Dhaka. The screenings were at the National Library of Bangladesh auditorium and at the Shilpakala Academy of Bangladesh.

The film was selected in the 'Chitrabharati (Indian Cinema) Competition' section of the 11th Bengaluru International Film Festival, 2019, organized by the Karnataka Chalanachitra Academy and supported by the Government of Karnataka. It was held between 21–28 February.

=== National Film Awards ===
The Times of India reported on 1 January 2018 that Rongberonger Korhi could not be sent for the National Film Awards for the year 2017 owing to the pending CBFC Certification, following the row created by the demonstrations and protests by the Hindu fringe group. The director had reportedly mentioned that the issue at stake was more important than any awards.

=== Theatrical release ===
The film was eventually released on 23 March, and a low key pre-release publicity campaign resulted in a feeble audience response in the opening weekend. It completed a total three-week run in the city theatres and another two-week run in the suburbs.
