= Aamra =

2006 Indian Bengali film

- DVD cover
- Directed by: Mainak Bhaumik
- Produced by: Nitesh Sharma
- Starring: Jisshu Sengupta; Parambrata Chatterjee
- Music by: Mayukh Bhowmik
- Release date: 2006
- Country: India
- Language: Bengali

Aamra (Bengali: আমরা, lit. 'We') is a 2006 Indian Bengali-language film directed by Mainak Bhaumik. The film stars Jisshu Sengupta, Parambrata Chatterjee, and Nilanjana Sharma. The film explores the lives of six characters from diverse backgrounds and their perspectives on love and relationships.

Aamra is described as a film for the youth, about the youth, and created by the youth. It is the first sex comedy in Bengali cinema.

== Plot ==
The story revolves around Amit Roy, Bhasha Chatterjee, Raj Mukherjee, Shreya Ghosal, Tapash Chatterjee, and Sunaina Bannerjee as they navigate their romantic lives. Amit, a filmmaker, reflects on his past relationship with Rupa, a married woman, which ended in a breakup. Tapash, an academic, is involved in an affair with Sunaina, a student. Raj, who is in a rock band and aspires to be a rockstar, was previously in a relationship with Shreya, a school teacher. Bhasha, a homemaker, develops a connection with Amit when she auditions for his film.

As the story progresses, Amit and Shreya reconnect through an online chatroom and go on a date. Raj becomes attracted to Sunaina, while Sunaina starts feeling uneasy with Tapash. Bhasha, suspecting infidelity, decides to divorce Tapash. As each character strives to understand their own feelings and find suitable partners, Sunaina breaks up with Tapash and proposes to Raj. Shreya opts for an arranged marriage, and Bhasha and Amit grow closer. Ultimately, the characters find their ideal partners and resolve their personal conflicts.

The film features a cast where Amit is an established telefilm director, Shreya is a young and attractive teacher, Raj is an aspiring rockstar, and Tapash is a professor. Bhasha, Tapash's wife, aspires to become an actress and develops feelings for Amit during the audition process.

== Cast ==
- Jisshu Sengupta
- Parambrata Chatterjee
- Rudranil Ghosh
- Amarnath Mukherjee
- Ashok Biswanathan
- Pallavi Chatterjee
- Ananya Chatterjee
- Mithu Chakraborty
- Nilanjana Sharma (Sengupta)
- Priyam Dasgupta (Momo)
