= Subarnalata =

- Genre: Drama
- Created by: Tron Videotrix; Sarbari Ghoshal Saurav Sengupta
- Based on: Subarnalata by Ashapoorna Devi
- Written by: Sarabari Ghoshal / Saurav Sengupta
- Directed by: Amitabha Bhattacharya; Bishnupada Maiti; Shakti Guha/>Abira Majumder
- Creative director: Sarbari Ghoshal Saurav Sengupta Joy Chandra Chandra
- Starring: Ananya Chatterjee; Sabitri Chatterjee; Ipshita Mukherjee; Biplab Banerjee; Anirban Guha; Bishwanath Basu
- Theme music composer: Pandit Tanmoy Bose
- Opening theme: Raanga Paaye Koinna Chole Mutuk Mathay Diya..
- Composer: Chandan Roy Chowdhury
- Country of origin: India
- Original language: Bengali
- No. of seasons: 1
- No. of episodes: 671

Production
- Executive producer: Saurav Sengupta Debolina
- Producer: Biswajit Guha (Tron Videotrix)
- Cinematography: Debnath Ganguly
- Editors: Sujit Sau; Shyamali Chanda
- Running time: 21 minutes

Original release
- Network: Zee Bangla
- Release: 26 April 2010 – 16 June 2012

Subarnalata was a Bengali television series that originally aired on Zee Bangla in 2010, and was based on the second part of the book trilogy by Ashapoorna Devi of the same name. It premiered from April 2010 at 6pm and was shifted to 8:30pm from July 2010. During the lock-down imposed in March 2020 due to the COVID-19 pandemic, all shooting at sets was shut. Following huge audience request, Subarnalata began re-telecasted. This Show is 3rd time repeat telecast on Zee Bangla Cinema on 30 June 2024. (Mon - Sun 10.30PM)

== Plot ==
Subarnalata chronicles the life and times of a Bengali Hindu girl called Subaranalata aka Subarno who is brought up in a progressive household by her mother Satyabati, by enrolling her to Bethune School and imparting in her a deep sense of love for the motherland and respect for the freedom fighters who fought the British. However, Subarno is tricked into marrying at the age of 9 (as per the prevalent Hindu norms) into a rich orthodox family. The marriage is held against Satyabati's wishes and her knowledge by her mother-in-law and Subarno's grandmother, Elokeshi. The incident prompts Satyabati to not acknowledge the marriage in front of Subarno's inlaws. Satyabati's reaction infuriates the in-laws of Subarno, that forms the crux of the treatment meted out to Subarno in later days.

The plot mainly revolves around the pathetic circumstances and oppression women of that era were subjected to in orthodox families, where they had no voices of their own. Subarno, a strong-headed, courageous but kind and generous woman, defies all the brutalities of her husband, Prabodh, a hot headed conservative man, who is unable to accept his beautiful wife's progressive thoughts and is always suspicious of her noble intentions. Subarno's kindhearted ways are supported by her eldest brother-in-law Subodh, and elder sister-in-law Susheel and her open-minded husband Kedar babu. She forges a strong bond with her youngest sister-in-law, Raju (Biraaj), who though dislikes Subarno in the initial days after Subarno's entry in the family, but grows fond of her gradually.

The show presents Subarno's realization that to bring about a change, one does not need to wield a weapon like the revolutionaries fighting the British in India but by trying to gradually peel off the harmful traditions by staying within the same society. It documents her daily struggles and turmoils to win the little victories with her perseverance, courage and intelligence and the hardships that she has to go through to achieve them.

== Cast ==
- Ananya Chatterjee as Satyabati / Subarnalata: Satyabati's daughter(After some years Subarnalata) (MejoBou)
- Ipsita Mukherjee as Young Subarnalata: Satyabati's 9 Years old daughter
- Sabitri Chatterjee as Muktokeshi Debi:Prabodh, Subodh, Biraj, Prabhash and Prakash's mother- Subarnalata, Umashasi, Bindu and Giribala's mother in law
- Biswanath Basu as Prabodh: Subarnalata's husband, Muktokeshi's second son- Prabhas's, Prakash's elder brother and Subodh's younger brother
- Saugata Bandhopadhay as young Prabodh- Muktokeshi's child Son, Married in 17 years old.
- Biplab Banerjee as Nabakumar
- Papiya Sen as Sodu Pisi
- Kunal Padhi as Ramkali (Satyabati's father)
- Anirban Guha as Subodh: Muktokeshi's first son, Umashasi's husband- Prakash, Prabhash's and Prabod's elder brother
- Maitreyee Mitra / Ratri Ghatak as Umasashi: Subodh's wife (Baro Bou)
- Ranjini Chattopadhyay as poli
- Nina Chakroborty as Biraj
- Diya Chakraborty as young Biraj
- Avijit Sarkar as Prabhas
- Pritha Chatterjee as Jaya
- Ronit Ganguly as young Prabash
- Sneha Chatterjee as Giribala (Prabhas's wife, SejoBou)
- Biswajit Ghosh Majumder as Prakash
- Arpon Das as Young Prakash
- Antara Pakira Nandi as Bindu (Prakash's wife, ChotoBou)
- Sanjib Sarkar as Jagu Dada
- Chitra Sen as Shyamasundari Debi (Jagu's mother)
- Sumanta Mukherjee as Kedar Babu.
- Debarati Paul as Young Bakul
- Debaparna Chakraborty as Adult Bakul
- Indrasish Roy as Adult Sunirmal
- Rajat Ganguly as Parimal Ghoshal (Sunirmal's father)
- Ahana Ghosh as Young Chanpa/Nalini (a student of the Satyabati's school)
- Sofia Chattopadhyay as Adult Chanpa (Subarnalata's first child)
- Pritha Chatterjee as Jayabati
- Aratrika Roy as Young Parul
- Swastika Ghosh as Young Mallika
- Samata Chatterjee Lahiri as Adult Mallika (Subodh and Umasashi's first daughter).
- Lovely Maitra / Piyali Mukherjee as Wife of Subarnalata's eldest son

== Trivia ==
The title track of Subarnalata was rendered by Bangladeshi musician Anusheh Anadil and was composed by Pandit Tanmoy Bose. The track received critical acclaim for both Anadil and Bose and they were awarded Zee Bangla Gourav award.
