= Prosenjit Weds Rituparna =

2022 Indian Bengali film

- Theatrical release poster
- Directed by: Samrat Sharma
- Screenplay by: Samrat Sharma
- Story by: Samrat Sharma
- Dialogues by: Samrat Sharma
- Starring: Ipsita Mukherjee; Rishav Basu
- Cinematography: Animesh Ghorui
- Edited by: Pronoy Dasgupta
- Music by: Songs: Debdeep Mukherjee; Ranajoy Bhattacharjee; Shovan Ganguly; Score; Shamik Guha Roy; Durnibar Saha; Pranjal Das
- Production companies: Swastik Productions; Neidea Creations
- Release date: 2022
- Country: Indian
- Language: Bengali

Prosenjit Weds Rituparna is a 2022 Indian Bengali-language romantic comedy film directed by Samrat Sharma. The film features Ipsita Mukherjee and Rishav Basu in lead roles, with notable cameos by Prosenjit Chatterjee and Rituparna Sengupta, two iconic figures in Bengali cinema. Released on 25 November 2022, the movie explores themes of love, identity, and celebrity culture, blending humor with emotional depth. It was produced under the banner of Abhinava Dance Company and distributed across West Bengal.

== Plot ==
The story revolves around Rituparna, a young woman obsessed with the Bengali filmstar Prosenjit Chatterjee, who agrees to marry a man named Prosenjit simply because of his shared name with her idol. Meanwhile, her groom-to-be, Prosenjit, struggles with the burden of his famous namesake, having faced ridicule for it throughout his life. The narrative unfolds as a lighthearted exploration of their relationship, weaving in elements of mistaken identity and the influence of celebrity fandom, culminating in a blend of comedy and heartfelt moments.

== Cast ==
- Ipsita Mukherjee as Rituparna
- Rishav Basu as Prosenjit
- Tania Kar
- Bhadra Basu
- Manasi Sinha
- Simoran Upadhyay
- Prosenjit Chatterjee as himself (cameo)
- Rituparna Sengupta as herself (cameo)

== Production ==
The film was the directorial debut of Samrat Sharma, who aimed to pay homage to the legacy of Prosenjit Chatterjee and Rituparna Sengupta, a popular on-screen pair from the 1990s and 2000s Bengali cinema. The title playfully hints at a wedding between the two stars, which sparked initial buzz and speculation among fans. The movie was promoted extensively, including events at Diamond Plaza Mall in Kolkata on 18 November 2022, ahead of its theatrical release.

== Release and reception ==
Prosenjit Weds Rituparna premiered in theaters on 25 November 2022. Critics offered mixed reviews: some praised its nostalgic tribute to Bengali cinema's golden era and the chemistry of its leads, while others felt it fell short of expectations set by its star-studded title. Publications like Anandabazar Patrika highlighted its appeal as a fun, nostalgic ride, whereas Sangbad Pratidin noted its attempt to balance entertainment with a fresh storyline. According to The Times of India review of "Prosenjit Weds Rituparna," the film offers an emotional and entertaining experience for the audience. The performances by Prosenjit Chatterjee and Rituparna Sengupta effectively bring the story to life.
