= Ananya Chatterjee =

Indian film actress

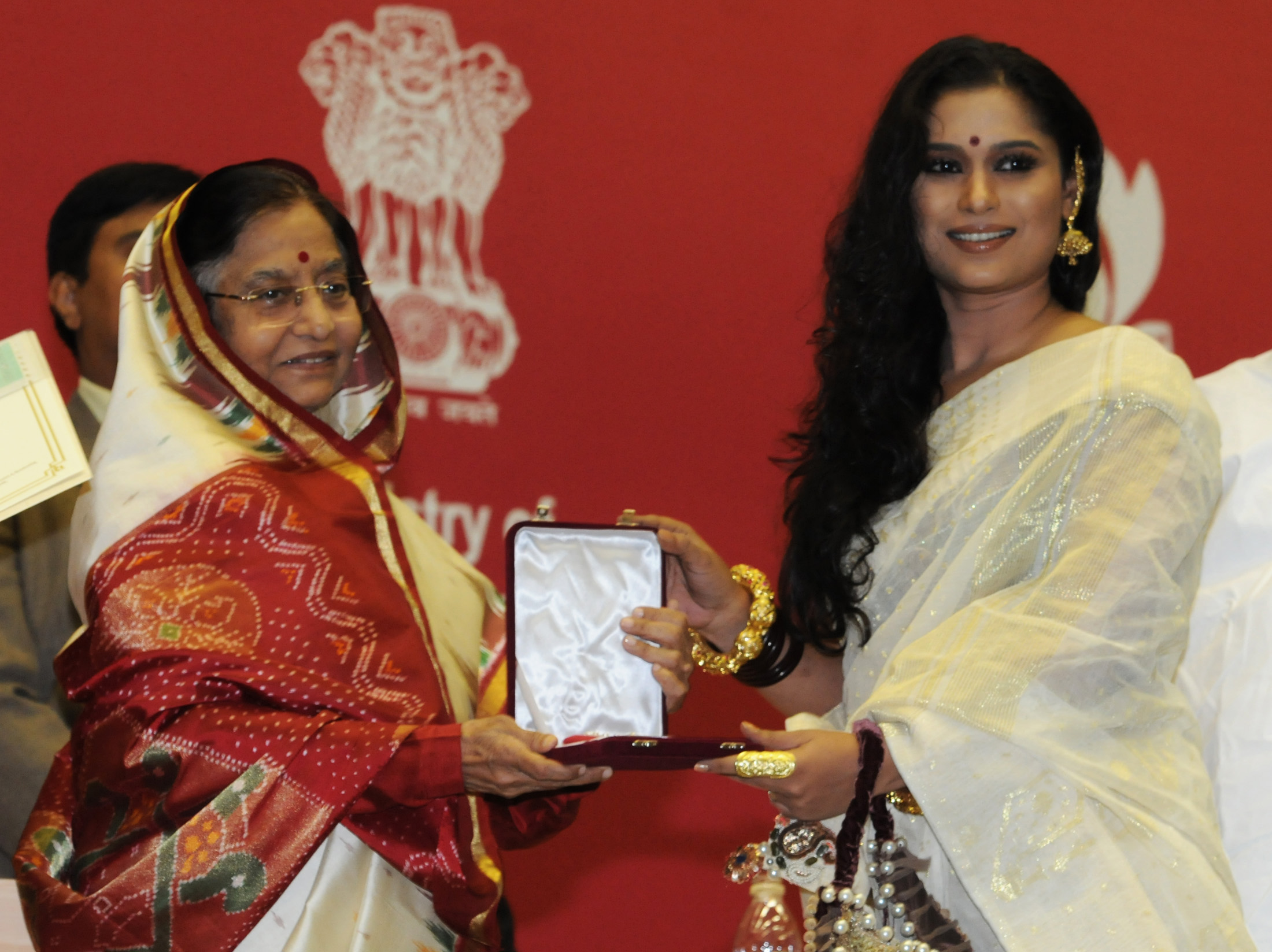
- Chatterjee (right) receiving the National Award from Pratibha Patil (left) at the 57th National Film Awards, 2010
- Born: Kolkata, West Bengal, India
- Education: University of Calcutta
- Occupation: Actress
- Years active: 2001–present
- Spouse: Raj Banerjee (m. 2015; div. 2019)

Ananya Chatterjee is an Indian actress who works in Bengali films. Known for her role in Abahoman which won her a National Award. She started her career as a TV actress. She acted in several TV serials and films, including three directed by Anjan Dutt. Her role as the muse of a married director in Abahoman, directed by Rituparno Ghosh, won her the National Film Award for Best Actress.

== Early life and education ==
Brought up in Kolkata, Chatterjee underwent education at G. D. Birla Centre and passed Class 10 board exams in 1994. Chatterjee studied microbiology at Jogamaya Devi College, an affiliated undergraduate women's college of the University of Calcutta.

== Career ==
Chatterjee was a student in Mamata Shankar's dance institution, when she started her acting career on television, with the TV series Din Pratidin where she acted opposite Rudranil Ghosh, and went to on appear on soap operas like Tithir Atithi, Aleya, and Ananya. Despite having no formal training in acting, her work was appreciated and she became a household name; soon appearing in three telefilms directed by Anjan Dutt, John Johnny Janardan, Ek Din Darjeeling and Amar Baba. Subsequently, she made her feature film debut with Sharan Dutta's thriller Raat Barota Paanch (2005). After appearing in the comedy Aamra (2006) by Mainak Bhaumik, her next important film was debutant director Agnidev Chatterjee's, Probhu Nashto Hoye Jai (Lord, Let the Devil Steal My Soul), which premiered at the 13th Kolkata Film Festival.

In 2009, appearing opposite veteran Soumitra Chatterjee in Suman Ghosh's Dwando she managed to stand her ground and then in Anup Sengupta's Mama Bhagne (2009) where again her performance was reviewed as "stellar". However, it was in Rituparno Ghosh's Abohoman, released in 2010, that established her as an actress of repute, winning her first National Film Award for Best Actress. In the 2012 Bengali film Meghe Dhaka Tara directed by Kamaleswar Mukherjee, Chatterjee played the role of Durga, wife of Nilkantha Bagchi.

She performed the lead role in the popular Bengali serial Subarnolata airing on Zee Bangla.

== Filmography ==
Year	Film	Director	Character
2005	Raat Barota Paanch	Saran Dutta	Shyamali
2006	Aamra	Mainak Bhaumik	Shreya
2007	Probhu Nosto Hoi Jai	Agnidev Chatterjee	Jhilmil Chowdhury
2009	Angshumaner Chhobi	Atanu Ghosh	Souriya Ray
2009	Dwando	Suman Ghosh	Sudipta
2009	Mama Bhagne	Anup Sengupta	Payel
2010	Laptop	Kaushik Ganguly	Shubhaa
2010	Abohomaan	Rituparno Ghosh	Shikha Sarkar/ Srimati Sarkar
2011	Iti Mrinalini	Aparna Sen	Hiya Majumdar
2012	Teen Kanya	Agnidev Chatterjee	Nancy
2013	Anya Na	Parthasarathi Joardar	Ananya
2013	Anwar Ka Ajab Kissa	Buddhadev Dasgupta	Malini
2013	Meghe Dhaka Tara	Kamaleshwar Mukherjee	Durga
2014	Jodi Love Dile Na Prane	Abhijit Guha & Sudeshna Roy	Paromita
2014	Jaatishwar	Srijit Mukherji	Joggesshori
2015	Jogajog	Sekhar Das	Shyamasundari
2017	Tope	Buddhadeb Dasgupta	Rekha (King's wife)
2019	Bhalo Maye Kharap Maye	Tamal Dasgupta	Riya
2021	72 Ghanta	Atanu Ghosh	Sumedha
2025	Shotyi Bole Shotyi Kichhu Nei	Srijit Mukherji	Roopa
2025	Putulnacher Itikatha	Suman Mukhopadhyay	Sen Didi
2025	Annapurna	Anshuman Pratyush	Annapurna
2025	Madam Sengupta	Sayantan Ghosal	Yashodhara
2025	Aap Jaisa Koi	Vivek Soni	Shona
2026	Phool Pishi O Edward	Nandita Roy & Shiboprosad Mukherjee	Putli Bai

== Web series ==
Year	Title	Director	Role	Platform	Notes	Ref.
2021	Mohomaya	Kamaleswar Mukherjee		Hoichoi		
2022	Murder By The Sea	Anjan Dutt		Hoichoi		
2024	Kaantaye Kaantaye	Joydeep Mukherjee		ZEE5		
2026	Gorkyr Maa			Fridaay		

== Other works ==
=== Soap operas ===
- Chena Mukher Sari
- Din Pratidin
- Tithir Atithi
- Aleya
- Manik
- Ananya
- Banhisikha
- Dhyatterika (Zee Bangla)
- Gaaner Oparey (Star Jalsha)
- Kon Se Alor Sopno Niye
- Nana Ronger Dinguli
- Purbopurush
- Kokhono Megh Kokhono Brishti (ETV Bangla)
- Ashombhob (Zee Bangla)
- Subarnalata (Zee Bangla)
- Jay Kali Kalkattawali (Star Jalsha)

=== Telefilms ===
- John Johnny Janardan
- Ek Din Darjeeling
- Amar Baba
- Nir Bhangeni
- Akasher Khoje
- Spandan
- Duoranir Sadh
- Anahuto Atithi
- Bhalobaso
- Sopner naam Bhalobasa
- Amar Praner pore
- Hoyto Tomari jonno
- Gopono Kathati
- Ichamoti
- Sondhebelar Alo
- July
- Sukh
- Aparichito
- Sudhu Eka
- Onno Bhalobasa
- Proshthan Porbo
- Balyobondhu
- Prempotro
- Sonkromon
- Ektuku Icche
- Jongoler Chitronattyo
- Devdas-Paro

=== Short films ===
- Dheu (2000)
- Debi (2015)
- Dui Shalik (2020)

=== Audio drama ===
No Solution (2019)

== Reality shows ==
Year	Show	Role	Channel	Notes	Reference
2006–2007	Ritur Mela Jhum Tara Ra Ra	Celebrity Dance Participant	ETV Bangla	Winner	
2018	Dance Bangla Dance Junior	Judge	Zee Bangla		
2020–2021	Shrimati Champion	Host	Colors Bangla		

== Accolades ==
Year	Award	Category	Film/Show	Result	Ref.
2010	National Film Award for Best Actress	Best Actress	Abohomaan	Won	
2011	Zee Bangla Gourab Samman	Best Actress (Cinema)	Abohoman	Won	
2011	Zee Bangla Gourab Samman	Best Actress (TV)	Subarnalata	Won	
2011	Anandalok Puraskar	Best Actress (TV)	Subarnalata	Won	
2013	Filmfare Award (Bengali)	Best Actor (Female)	Meghe Dhaka Tara	Nominated	
2013	Tele Samman Award		Meghe Dhaka Tara	Won	
2018	Tele Samman Award	Most Popular Actress	Jai Kali Kalkattawali	Won	
2018	Star Jalsha Parivar Awards	Priyo Notun Sodoshyo (Mohila)	Jai Kali Kalkattawali	Won	
2018	Star Jalsha Parivar Awards	Priyo Bou	Jai Kali Kalkattawali	Nominated	
2022	Anandalok Puraskar	Best Actress (OTT)	Mohomaya	Nominated	
2022	Hoichoi Awards	Outstanding First Appearance (Female)	Mohomaya	Won	
