= 3 Kanya =

- Film poster
- Directed by: Agnidev Chatterjee
- Screenplay by: Sudipa Mukhopadhyay
- Story by: Agnidev Chatterjee
- Produced by: Rose Valley Films
- Starring: Rituparna Sengupta; Ananya Chatterjee; Unnati Davara; Rajatava Dutta
- Edited by: Santanu Mukherjee
- Music by: Indradip Dasgupta
- Release date: 2 November 2012
- Country: India
- Language: Bengali

3 Kanya or Teen Kanya (2012) is a Bengali psychological action thriller film written and directed by Agnidev Chatterjee. The film tells a story of the lives of three women. The characters are played by Rituparna Sengupta, Ananya Chatterjee and Unnati Davara.

== Plot ==
The story of the film revolves around the lives of three women– Aparna, Damini and Nancy. Aparna is a journalist. She suspects that her husband is having an affair with Damini, an IPS officer. Aparna's husband is kidnapped. Aparna goes to meet Damini and a relationship between them begins. Nancy is a call-girl who is raped. She lodges a complaint to the local council but it goes in vain. She then approaches a news channel where Aparna is a journalist, Aparna helps her to get justice.

== Cast ==
Main cast

- Rituparna Sengupta as Aparna Dutta
- Ananya Chatterjee as Nancy Sen
- Unnati Davara as Damini Mishra
- Rajatava Dutta as Subhash Sen
- Sudip Mukherjee as Rajatabha Dutta
- Biplab Chatterjee as Biswanath Banerjee
- Shankar Chakrabarty as Kali Babu
- Suman Bannerjee as Arijit Da
- Anindya Banerjee as Vicky
- Joydeep Ckhraborty (as a sweeper)
- Sairity Banerjee
- Prarona Bhatacharjee

Friendly appearance

- Subhasish Mukherjee
- Biswanath Basu
- Arindam Sil
- Vikram Chatterjee

Guest appearance

- Bratya Basu

== Soundtrack ==
All lyrics are written by Srijato; all music is composed by Indraadip Dasgupta.

No.	Title	Lyrics	Singer(s)	Length
1.	"Golemale"	Srijato	Arijit Singh, Monali Thakur
2.	"Kono Ek Din"			4:12
3.	"Yaad Piya Ki"	Srijato	Shreya Ghoshal, Ustad Rashid Khan	4:19
