= Bhalo Maye Kharap Maye =

2019 Bengali film by Tamal Dasgupta

- Theatrical release poster
- Directed by: Tamal Dasgupta
- Starring: Sreelekha Mitra; Ananya Chatterjee
- Release date: 2019
- Country: India
- Language: Begnali

Bhalo Maye Kharap Maye is a 2019 Bengali drama film directed by Tamal Dasgupta. The film is based on a novel of the same name by Suchitra Bhattacharya and was scheduled for release on 13 September 2019 under the banner of Srijita Films and Entertainment. Despite generating significant attention, the film failed to receive critical acclaim upon its release.

== Plot ==
Ria Fernandez, a professional bar dancer, lives in Park Circus, Kolkata with her unemployed alcoholic husband, Shabby, and their baby. One midnight, while returning home, three customers of the bar forcefully abduct Ria and rape her. She fights for justice but loses the case in the lower court. Samiran Sen, a renowned lawyer at the Calcutta High Court, takes up her case, and Ria wins the battle. However, the fact is that Samiran took the case with the intention of gaining fame rather than seeking justice for the assaulted woman. While intoxicated, Samiran confesses this to his wife, Urmi. Urmi realizes the true nature of her husband and acknowledges that her position is no different from that of a bar dancer in a male-dominated society. She decides to leave Samiran.

== Cast ==
- Ananya Chatterjee as Ria Fernández
- Silajit Majumder as Shabby
- Joy Sengupta as Samiran Sen
- Sreelekha Mitra as Urmi Sen
- Arindam Sil
