= Madhur Milan =

- Directed by: Tushar Majumdar
- Produced by: Sajjad Production
- Starring: Prosenjit Chatterjee; Rituparna Sengupta; Abhishek Chatterjee; Biplab Chatterjee
- Music by: Babul Bose
- Release date: 2000
- Country: India
- Language: Bengali

Madhur Milan is a 2000 Bengali romantic drama musical film directed by Tushar Majumdar and produced by Sajjad Production. The film stars Prosenjit Chatterjee, Rituparna Sengupta, Abhishek Chatterjee, and Biplab Chatterjee. The music was composed by Babul Bose.

== Plot ==
Sunita, a young lady who hails from a rich business family and Gopal, a poor boy are in love. Gopal is an excellent singer but struggling. Sunita's family is completely against their marriage.

== Cast ==
- Prosenjit Chatterjee as Gopal/ Babuji in past life
- Rituparna Sengupta as Sunita/ Phoolmoti in past life
- Abhishek Chatterjee
- Biplab Chatterjee as Banwari
- Chinmoy Roy
- Subhendu Chatterjee
- Gita Dey as Phoolmoti's grandmother
- Soma Dey
- Haradhan Banerjee
- Pallavi Chatterjee as Kamli
