= Trishna (2009 film) =

- Poster of Movie Trishna
- Directed by: Pritam Jalan
- Starring: Rituparna Sengupta, Angshuman Gupta
- Release date: 30 January 2009
- Running time: 120 minutes
- Country: India
- Language: Bengali

Trishna (Bengali: তৃষ্ণা) is a 2009 Bengali film directed by Pritam Jalan. The film stars Rituparna Sengupta, Angshuman Gupta (finalist in Grasim Mr India 2006) and Arindam Sil. This film was objected for Vulgurity by West Bengal Film Publicity Act that Rituparna Sengupta was too Skimpy, seductive. However, the West Bengal Film Publicity Act rejected the public presentation of some movie posters of Trishna. The West Bengal Film Publicity Act is basically a local body that gives clearance for films to be released in West Bengal only. Such act does not exist in any other Indian States. This movie is a Bengali remake of Bipasha Basu and John Abraham starrer Hindi film "Jism" The Telegraph commented that "Though almost a scene-by-scene copy of John Abraham-Bipasha Basu’s Jism, Pritam Jalan’s Trishna is nothing more than a sleaze fest with Tolly’s leading heroine 'showing' the way".

== Plot ==
Raja, a professional photographer and a playboy, meets Tiasha at a bar. She is different from the girls he knows and has an electrifying presence; she captivates him. She is sensuous and Raja lusts after her. He starts an affair with her. She tells him that her mother has blood cancer and she doesn't have good relations with her husband who is away. She tells him that Shekhar is not a nice person. Shekhar returns and meets Raja at the bar. Tiasha tells Raja that Shekhar has made a will whereby he has decided to leave half his property to his wife and half to his sister Sumana whom he is close to. But Sumana and Tiasha dislike each other. Raja decides to eliminate Shekhar in order to be with Tiasha.

One night Raja goes to Tiasha's house to kill Shekhar and Shekhar is killed when there is a tussle between them. They dump Shekhar's body into the sea. Meanwhile, Subir and Rana, (Raja's childhood friends) tell Raja to change his ways as they have noticed a change in him lately. Raja is imprisoned on charges of murdering Shekhar as a button of his jacket had been found near the scene of the murder, but he is soon released. He learns that he has been appointed the executor of the new will which Shekhar had made a few days back before his death leaving his entire property to Tiasha. Sumana believes that this will is fake. She meets Raja in private one day and tells him the truth about Tiasha. She had given a locket to Raja which is accidentally left behind at the beach while disposing of Shekhar's body. Subir, the S.P (Raja's friend), who is investigating the case tells him to mend his ways, but he refuses to listen. Tiasha calls Raja one day and asks him to meet at her residence. He refuses to entertain her in the beginning as he had begun to disbelieve her, but complies with her demand. On reaching her residence, he finds a bag in the garden house and realizes that Tiasha must have killed Sumana. Tiasha is nowhere to be seen, so Raja decides to wait for Tiasha and finish her off once she arrives. Subir, Raja's friend also arrives there and conceals himself and watches the proceedings. She arrives soon after and pleads innocence, but Raja refuses to believe her. Tiasha tells him there is proof in the garden house and she goes there, but there is a huge blast. Subir tells Raja later that Tiasha had escaped though Raja had thought her to be dead and she is nowhere to be found. After a year, Tiasha reappears at the same place wearing the same outfit waiting for her next prey.

== Cast ==
- Rituparna Sengupta
- Angshuman Gupta
- Arindam Sil
