= Mukherjee Dar Bou =

2019 Indian Bengali-language film

- Release poster
- Directed by: Pritha Chakraborty
- Written by: Samragnee Bandyopadhyay
- Produced by: Nandita Roy, Shiboprosad Mukherjee
- Starring: Anusuya Majumdar; Koneenica Banerjee; Biswanath Basu; Rituparna Sengupta
- Cinematography: Supriyo Dutta
- Edited by: Moloy Laha
- Music by: Rabindranath Tagore, Indraadip Dasgupta
- Production company: Windows Production
- Release date: 8 March 2019 (India)
- Running time: 127 mins
- Country: India
- Language: Bengali

Mukherjee Dar Bou [lit. Mr.Mukherjee's wife] (2019) is an Indian Bengali film directed by Pritha Chakraborty. This was Chakraborty's debut film as a director. The film tells a story of a Bengali family, the relationship between a mother-in-law and her daughter-in-law. The music of the film was composed by Indraadip Dasgupta.

== Synopsis ==
Mukherjee Dar Bou is a story based on a modern dysfunctional family revolving around the complex and intricate yet caring relationship of a mother-in-law and her daughter-in-law. The story revolves around a Bengali homemaker whose name is not known until the end of the film, and who is mostly referred to as “Mukherjee Dar Bou”. Mukherjee Dar Bou (Aditi) is married for more than ten years and has a daughter, who is six years old. Aditi's married life is usual but it takes a turn when her father-in-law passes away and her mother-in-law finds it difficult to cope with the changed dynamics within the family set-up. It reaches a breaking point when one day the mother-in-law gets angry and throws the rolling pin and the kid, Icche Puron, comes in between and gets hurt. Aditi's friend suggests she take her mother-in-law to a psychologist. Though apprehensive, she takes her mother-in-law to the psychologist by lying about the reality. In this film, various shades of women and their crises have been shown and this movie is about the path of overcoming their different individual crises.

== Cast ==
- Anusuya Majumdar as Shova Rani Mukherjee
- Koneenica Banerjee as Aditi Mukherjee
- Rituparna Sengupta as Aratrika Bhattacharya
- Aparajita Auddy as Putul Das
- Badshah Moitra as Ajitesh
- Biswanath Basu as Shashwata Mukherjee
- Shankar Chakraborty as Putul's Husband
- Richa Sharma as Rahi
- Adolina as Icche Puron Mukherjee

== Release and reception ==
The film released on 8 March 2019 on International Women's Day. Millennium Post, in their review, wrote: "The beauty of the film lies not in dwelling on these scars, but in showing a way how even such stubborn scars can be wiped off with a pinch of understanding and love. It's about repairing human relationships slowly."

== Themes ==
Released on International Woman's day, the central theme of the movie is Feminism. It refers to various cultural phrases and ideas, typically identified as patriarchal. The film also touches upon how these cultural saying and habits are passed through generations of women, without careful examination or prejudice. It is considered one of the landmark movies of the Bengali film industry as it's the first ever Bengali film to celebrate the day by coming up with a story by the women, having female leads.

== Sound Track ==
TITLE	LYRICS	MUSIC	SINGER	LENGTH
O Jibon Tomar Shathe	Dipangshu Acharya	Indraadip Dasgupta	Iman Chakraborty	3:13
Kobe Ashbe	Dipangshu Acharya	Indraadip Dasgupta	Ishaan Mitra	3:59
Khanchar Pakhi	Rabindranath Tagore	Rabindranath Tagore	Nikhita Gandhi	3:59
Himshim	Akash Chakrabarty	Indraadip Dasgupta	Shovon Ganguly	3:31

== Achievements ==
The film bagged the Critics’ Choice film award for Gender Sensitivity. The Times of India gave a four star rating to the film. Times of India in their review wrote: “It’s a story of emancipation — from the invisible shackles that tie most women to an identity that’s not really their own, but of the man in their lives.” https://timesofindia.indiatimes.com/entertainment/bengali/movie-reviews/mukherjee-dar-bou/movie-review/68332602.cms https://planetbollywood.com/wp/news/windows-productions-film-best-critics-choice-award/
