= Hrid Majharey =

2014 film by Ranjan Ghosh

- Directed by: Ranjan Ghosh
- Written by: Ranjan Ghosh
- Produced by: AP Films Pvt Ltd
- Starring: Abir Chatterjee; Raima Sen; Indrasish Roy; Arun Mukherjee; Barun Chanda; Sohag Sen; Tamal Roychowdhury; Tanusree Goswami; Shonali Sanyal; Prasun Chatterjee
- Cinematography: Sirsha Ray
- Edited by: Bodhaditya Banerjee
- Music by: Mayookh Bhaumik
- Distributed by: Piyali Films
- Release date: 11 July 2014 (India)
- Running time: 122 mins
- Country: India
- Language: Bengali

Hrid Majharey (English: Live in my Heart) is a 2014 India-Bengali romantic tragedy film written and directed by debutant Bengali filmmaker Ranjan Ghosh. It was originally presented as a tribute to Shakespeare on the 450th anniversary of his birth in 2014. Its first showing occurred at a British conference about the Bard held in London. In 2015, the movie was screened at the New York University Tisch School of the Arts.

Abir Chatterjee and Raima Sen debuted together in a romantic pairing for the first time in this modern revisiting of the works of William Shakespeare.

== Plot ==
The film begins with a disheveled Abhijit (Abir Chatterjee) entering a room to find Debjani (Raima Sen) lying dead on the bed. The film then describes previous events. Abhijit is a professor of mathematics at St. Xavier's College, Kolkata. He lives with his only sister, Mallika, who is a crime journalist.

Abhijit has a chance meeting with a soothsayer (Sohag Sen), who warns him to stay away from love for his own good, but the warning is ignored by the professor. On a rainy night in Calcutta, he notices a damsel in distress, Debjani. She is stranded, since her taxi has broken down. Abhijit gives Debjani, a trainee heart surgeon, a lift in his car. They date and fall in love. Abhijit, however, faces a problem at his job when an infatuated student proposes to him. He rejects her, so she retaliates. Afterwards, he is initially arrested, and then ostracized by others. Faced with issues at work, he goes to the Andamans, along with Debjani, in search of a new life.

There, they meet Subhro (Indrasish Roy), who is Debjani's younger acquaintance from their high school days. Subhro runs a non-governmental organisation at Port Blair and composes music as his pastime. Subhro and Debjani spend time together, reviving their friendship. At times, Abhijit gets jealous of Subhro's unwavering attention to Debjani. Subhro dies in an accident, leaving Abhijit in a confused state. He begins to question himself about the prophecy of the soothsayer. The film ends on another rainy evening in Port Blair, which in the Andaman Islands.

== Cast ==
- Abir Chatterjee as Abhijit Mukherjee
- Raima Sen as Debjani
- Indrasish Roy as Subhro Sarkar
- Barun Chanda as Professor Sen
- Sohag Sen as Ho Chin Hua
- Arun Mukherjee as Pagla Dashu
- Tamal Roychowdhury as Professor Basu
- Madhuchhanda Ghosh as 'Reba Maashi'
- Tanusree Goswami as Mallika Mukherjee
- Prasun Chatterjee as Indra Halder
- Aditya Sengupta as Amit Mishra
- Sonali Sanyal as Shinjini Mitra
- Breeti Sarkar as Niomi Dey

== Scripting and pre-production ==
The first draft of the screenplay was written in 2008 and underwent rewrites until a producer was hired for the film in 2012. This was an assignment in the scriptwriting syllabus at Whistling Woods International Film Institute, where Ghosh was a screenwriting student from 2007 to 2009.

Pre-production began in October 2012 and ended in January 2013. Reece traveled multiple times to Kolkata and twice to the Andaman Islands to search for filming locations.

== Principal photography and post-production ==
The film was shot on a RED EPIC camera by ace cinematographer Sirsha Ray, who had shot Bollywood movies such as Home Delivery and Aladin and Bengali films including Clerk, Shabdo, Shesher Kabita and Apur Panchali, among others. The first day of the film's shoot was 3 February 2013. The film was shot over a period of 23 days, with 13 days shot in Kolkata, and the remaining 10 days in the Andaman and Nicobar Islands.

Hrid Majharey is one of the two Bengali films (after Sabuj Dwiper Raja in 1979) to be shot in the Archipelagos; it also is the first ever Bengali film and one of the few Indian films to have been shot inside of the Cellular Jail in Port Blair. The crew also filmed at Ross Island, Havelock Islands, Chidia Tapu, Corbyn's Cove Beach, Munda Pahar Beach, Wandoor Beach, Aberdeen Bazaar, the Marine Jetty, and other private and government-owned locations.

The film was edited by Bodhaditya Banerjee and its music production was done by Mayookh Bhaumik, who won at the National Film Awards for his work as a music director.

== Theme ==
Hrid Majharey focuses on topics such as love, jealousy, faith, delusion, destiny and free will. The central theme of the film is that a person's destiny is determined by their character. It talks about a "Self-fulfilling prophecy," wherein a prophecy is made about a person and they, in the process of trying to prevent it from happening, fulfill it. The film is also about how a person's dreams may remain out of their reach.

== Legacy ==
In 2015, the Oxford, Cambridge and RSA Examinations Board included Hrid Majharey in "Additional References - World/International Adaptations of Othello" for the "Heroes and Villains - Othello" section of an A-Level drama and theatre course.

Shakespearean experts consider Hrid Majharey to be a major film from India that has deftly handled the Shakespearean themes, and have included the movie in their list of Top 10 film adaptations of Shakespeare's works since 1949. In their own words, "Over the years, Indian cinema has taken his unforgettable characters and resurrected them, making sure that the Shakespearean dynasty multiplies by the dozen. The ten faces we’ve chosen are pukka Shakespeare-wallahs. They have the Bard’s blood flowing through their veins. Together, they just prove one thing – when anything from Stratford gets stratified in India, the result is always A-one.".

The film was the focus of the "Bengali Shakespeares" segment in an international conference titled "Indian Shakespeares on Screen," which was held in London by the British Film Institute and The University of London in April 2016 to mark 400 years after the Bard's death.

Vidura Magazine, which is published by Press Institute of India, featured Hrid Majharey in its October–December 2016 edition, three years after its theatrical release.

== Soundtrack ==
The soundtrack has music composed by Mayookh Bhaumik, with lyrics by Kaushik Ganguly and Prasenjit Mukherjee. The music was released on 1 July 2014.

No.	Title	Lyrics	Performer(s)	Length
1.	"Emni Korey"	Prasenjit Mukherjee	Kinjal Chattopadhyay	4:17
2.	"Jaa Urey"	Kaushik Ganguly	Kaushiki Chakrabarty	3:04
3.	"Dekhechhi Roop Shagorey"	Traditional Folk	Rajib Das, Ishita Chakravarty (vocals)	5:10
4.	"Tomaay Hrid Majharey Rakhibo"	Traditional Folk	Zeenia Roy	5:50
5.	"Hrid Majharey Theme"	Instrumental	Instrumental	4:07
