= Charuulata 2011 =

2012 film by Agnidev Chatterjee

- Poster
- Directed by: Agnidev Chatterjee
- Based on: Nastanirh by Rabindranath Tagore
- Starring: Rituparna Sengupta; Arjun Chakraborty; Kaushik Sen
- Release date: 2 March 2012 (Kolkata)
- Country: India
- Language: Bengali

Charuulata 2011 is a 2012 Bengali film directed by Agnidev Chatterjee. This film is based on Rabindranath Tagore's 1901 novella Nastanirh.

== Plot ==
Chaiti is the beautiful young wife of newspaper editor Bikramjit, a workaholic who is always busy with his editorial works. In spite of being a highly educated woman, Chaiti has nothing to do and she spends her time with expensive saris, filing nails, and watching TV.

Unhappy with her marriage and after an unfortunate miscarriage, Chaiti befriends Amal to pass time. Amal is good looking and adventurous. From Amal's point of view Chaiti is Charulata 2011.

== Cast ==
- Rituparna Sengupta as Chaiti
- Kaushik Sen
- Dolon Roy
- Arjun Chakraborty as Bikramjit
- Dibyendu Mukherjee as Amal

== See also ==
- Life in Park Street, 2012 Bengali film
