= Rituparna Sengupta =

Indian actress and producer

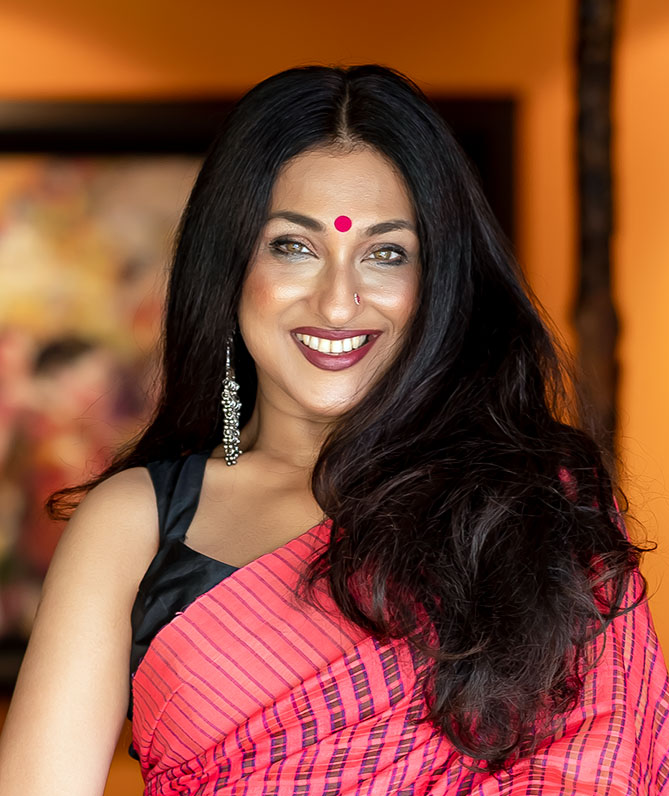
- Rituparna Sengupta in 2020
- Born: 7 November 1970 (age 55); Kolkata, West Bengal, India
- Other name: Chumki
- Education: University of Calcutta
- Occupations: Actress; producer
- Years active: 1988–present
- Debut: Rong Berong (1988)
- Organization: Bhavna Aaj O Kal
- Works: Full list
- Spouse: Sanjay Chakrabarty (m. 1999)
- Children: 2
- Website: www.rituparna.com

Rituparna Sengupta is Indian actress and producer who is known for her work in Bengali, Odia and Hindi cinema. One of the most successful actresses of Bengali cinema, she rode the crest of her box office success in the late 1990s. She has won a National Award, two Filmfare Awards, four BFJA Awards and four Anandalok Awards.

Sengupta made her screen debut opposite Arindam Ganguly in the Bengali fantasy TV series Rong Berong (1988) directed by Bimal Bhowmik and produced by Ratna Ghoshal. Her first film was Bahattar Din Par (1990) opposite Arjun Chakraborty. Throughout her career, she featured in a host of National Award-winning Bengali films such as Shwet Patharer Thala (1992), Lathi (1996), Dahan (1997), Paromitar Ek Din, (2000), Mondo Meyer Upakhyan (2002) and Anuranan (2006). She made her Hindi cinema debut with Partho Ghosh's Teesra Kaun (1994).

== Early life ==
Sengupta was born on 7 November 1970. She was interested in the arts since a young age and learned painting, dancing, singing and handicrafts at a painting school, called Chitrangshu. She studied at Carmel High school, and later graduated in history from Lady Brabourne College. She began studying Modern History for an M.A. at University of Calcutta, but had to interrupt studies to concentrate on her career as an actress.

== Career ==
=== Debut and initial struggle (1988—1990) ===
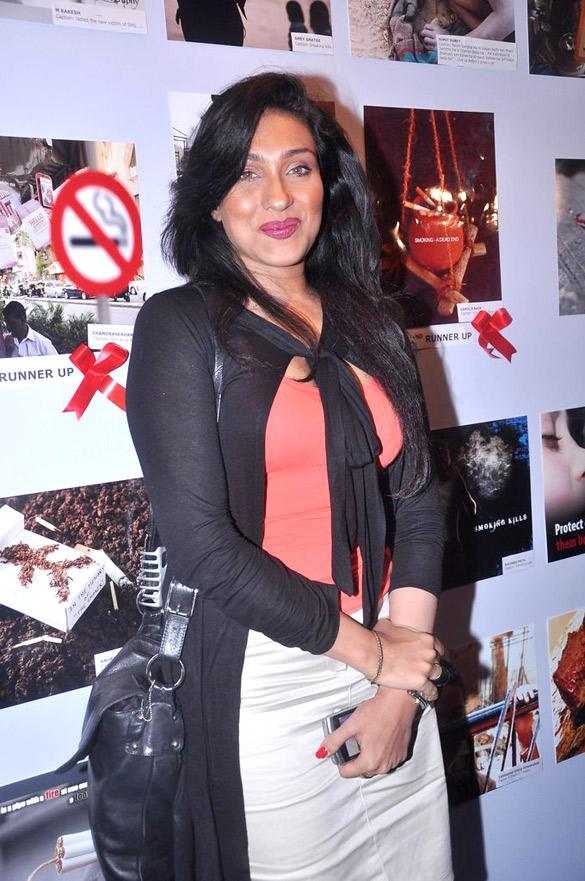
Sengupta at No Tobacco campaign organised by CPAA c. 2012

Sengupta made her screen debut opposite Arindam Ganguly in the Bengali fantasy TV series Rong Berong (1988) broadcast on DD Bangla. Kushal Chakraborty's sister Anindita Paul was her classmate. After her Secondary Examination, she was insisted by Anindita to appear for a screen test for a role in the series. She was finally chosen as the female lead in the second episode Sada Payra (Note: The first episode based on Beauty and the Beast featured Moon Moon Sen as Beauty.) alongside Arindam Ganguly and Gita Dey. The TV series was directed by Bimal Bhowmik and produced by Ratna Ghosal. The episode was an adaptation of the Danish fairy tale The White Dove. She had to play an imprisoned princess shapeshifting into a white dove who falls in love with an imprisoned prince played by Ganguly. Initially her father made objection against her pursuing the role but then gave his consent since the role demanded two-day shoot. She went on to feature in some critically applauded Bengali series such as Seemana Chariye (1989), Shwet Kapot (1989) and Kalpurush (Note: It was her first collaboration with Kaushik Sen. He played the role of Arka.) (1990), produced by Teleframe. Based on Samaresh Majumdar's widely acclaimed novel of the same name, Kalpurush was directed by Raja Dasgupta. She also had a small role in Rathin Dhar's Bengali sitcom Hortoner Golam (1990) that featured Kaushik Banerjee in the titular role. It is based on Monilal Ganguly's Bengali story of the same name. Sengupta featured opposite Arjun Chakraborty in the NFDC film Bahattar Din Par (1990).

=== Breakthrough and success (1991—2007) ===
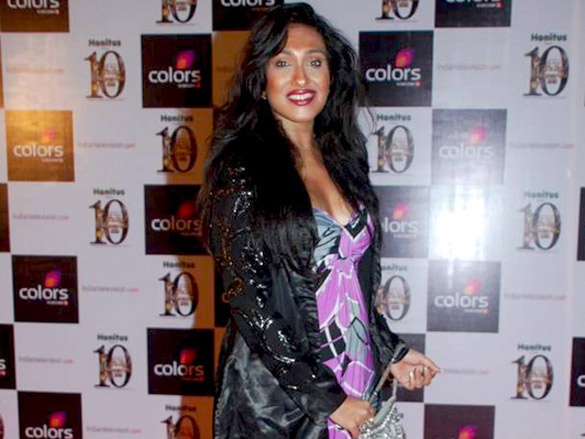
Sengupta at Indian Telly Awards, 2010

Sengupta played the role of Chintan in Jaisa Ka Taisa, a Bengali farce (Note: The farce was based on L'Amour médecin by Molière.) written by Girish Chandra Ghosh. It was staged at Minerva Theatre. Impressed with her performance, film director Shishir Majumdar offered her a role in his Bengali film Shesh Chithi (Note: Delayed release; 1994), starring Soumitra Chatterjee and Tanuja in the lead. Bijay Mohanty who also had a role in this film, advised her to audition for the role of the female lead in Vijay Bhaskar's Odia film Kotia Manish Gotiye Jaga (1991). The film is a remake of Velai Kidaichuduchu (1990). It manifests conflict based on the political sabotage in Sujanpur. Mohanty played the protagonist Jagan Das, an aspiring politician who subdues Naga, the powerful MLA of Sujanpur played by Raimohan Parida. Sengupta successfully auditioned for the female lead the film. She enacted Radha, the love interest of Jagan played by Mohanty. Her father Prabir Sengupta initially disapproved the film as she was required to enact a bathroom sequence alongside Mohanty. Later he changed his mind and approved her to accept the role. (Note: Sengupta's aunt who was a thespian actress mediated in this regard.) She was credited as Chumki in the film. The film became a major financial success.

Following the success of Kotia Manish Gotiye Jaga, Sengupta bagged several roles in Odia and Bengali films. After Gargi Roychowdhury declined the role of Titli opposite Bhaskar Banerjee in Prabhat Roy's National Award winning Bengali film Shwet Pathorer Thala (1992), Sengupta was offered to play the character. She once again collaborated with Bijoy Mohanty in Bhagya Hate Dori (1993). She featured opposite Prosenjit Chatterjee in Vijay Bhaskar's Nag Panchami (1994) and Chiranjeet Chakraborty in Prashanta Nanda's Laal Paan Bibi (1994). Since both the films worked at the box office, producers and directors approached her with meaty roles opposite Chatterjee and Chakraborty. Sengupta made her Hindi cinema debut opposite Chunkey Pandey in Partho Ghosh's thriller Teesra Kaun (1994) which was a debacle at the box office.

Sengupta bagged the female lead in Swapan Saha's Sujan Sakhi (1995) alongside Abhishek Chatterjee essaying the male lead. The film was a remake of Khan Ataur Rahman's Sujon Sokhi (1975). It was a major success at the box office. She featured opposite Chiranjeet Chakraborty in the latter's directorial venture Sansar Sangram (1995). The film retaining a highly melodramatic approach appeased the rural audience of West Bengal. She featured opposite Mithun Chakraborty in Raghuram's Bhagya Debata (1995). The film was a major financial success. She featured in Zee's home-production Mohini (1995), directed by Hema Malini. The telefilm stars Madhu and Sudesh Berry as the protagonists.

Sengupta hit the pinnacle of her professional rivalry with Satabdi Roy in the late 1990s since the two were offered most of the female leads opposite Prosenjit Chatterjee after Debashree Roy vowed not to work with Chatterjee any longer. Sreelekha Mitra claimed that Sengupta had an extramarital affair with Chatterjee, which helped her get most of the female leads opposite Chatterjee. She featured opposite Chatterjee in a string of commercially successful Bengali films such as Abujh Mon (1996), Matir Manush (1997), Mayar Badhon (1997), Moner Manush (1997), Pabitra Papi (1997), Samadhan (1997), Tomake Chai (1997), Baba Keno Chakar (1998), Praner Cheye Priyo (1998), Daay Dayitwa (1999), Madhu Malati (1999), Sindur Khela (1999), Sudhu Ekbar Bolo (1999), Tumi Ele Tai (1999), Aasroy (2000), Madhur Milan (2000) and Sasurbari Zindabad (2000) to name a few.

Some of her hits in Bangladeshi cinema include Sagarika (1998), Tomar Amar Prem (1998), Ranga Bou (1999). In the second year of Shakib Khan's career in 2000, she collaborated with him for the first time in FI Manik's action Palta Hamla: The Counter Attack.

She featured in Aparna Sen's Paromitar Ek Din (2000).

The story also had a sense of loss, betrayal, love, affection, sorrow – there was just so much to portray in that film. That was a huge learning experience for me and I was not even married back then so I had little idea about how a married woman should react in a particular situation and how a mother deals with an autistic child. It was a learning experience. Rina di helped me get in the skin of the character.

— Sengupta on working with Aparna Sen in Paromitar Ek Din (2000)

After her fallout with Prosenjit Chatterjee, she found herself in a very debilitating state.

Swapan Saha cast Sengupta alongside Abhishek Chatterjee, Tapas Paul and Satabdi Roy in his family drama Sukh Dukkher Sansar (2003). The film was a financial success.

In 2004, Sengupta had an Odia Film Katha Deithili Maa Ku with Sidhant Mohapatra only successful Venture of 2004, all other 12 releases in Bengali cinema, all of which became box office debacles generating the common notion among the filmmakers that the actress had lost her market value. Sengupta starred in Sushanta Saha's Sagar Kinare (2004) where she shared silver screen with Debashree Roy for the first time. She featured opposite Rajpal Yadav in Chandan Arora's critically acclaimed Main, Meri Patni Aur Woh (2005). She featured alongside Satabdi Roy and Koel Mallick in Raja Sen's Devipaksha (2004).

=== Setback (2008—2011) ===
Sengupta appeared in a host of films between 2008 and 2011, but only very few of those were commercially or critically successful. She starred as Damini in Suman Mukhopadhyay's Chaturanga (2008) which was the film adaptation of the novel of the same name by Rabindranath Tagore. The Times of India wrote that it was her best performance till date. The film failed to achieve commercial success. She featured in Mon Amour: Shesher Kobita Revisited (2008). The film became a major dud at the box office.

She accepted the role of a woman suffering from a turbulent conjugal relationship in Mahanagar@Kolkata (2010). She featured in Anjan Das' critically acclaimed but commercially unsuccessful film Bedeni (2011).

=== Resurgence and further roles (2012—present) ===
Sengupta featured in Agnidev Chatterjee's Charulata 2011 (2012). It narrates the story of a lonely woman whose workaholic husband does not have much time to spend with her. Eventually she meets a man younger than her and falls for him. She featured in Muktodhra (2012). She featured opposite Tapas Paul in Satabdi Roy's Om Shanti (2012) that also stars Rakhi Sawant in a dance number. Sengupta skipped the premier show of the film as she felt that Sawant had been given more preference than her in the poster of the film while Roy said that Sengupta's grievance was illogical. Sengupta later said that she regretted doing the role. The film received negative review. It was a major financial disaster.

Sengupta featured in Ratul Ganguly's 10 July (2014). The film failed to achieve critical favour and became a box office debacle.

She featured as Begum Jaan in Srijit Mukherji's Rajkahini (2015) and met box office success. Her character in the film is that of an aged prostitute who runs a brothel housing eleven women. The Times of India detected that Sengupta failed to land the coarseness of a rustic prostitute perfectly. News18 India appreciated her performance but deprecated her dubbing to be "a very forced husky baritone."

I have felt disappointed. This was when I didn’t get a National Award for Rajkahini. I had put my heart, blood and sweat into the film and I believe I deserved the award. The film deserved the appreciation. Kangana Ranaut bagged the award for a film like Tanu Weds Manu Returns. I thought the whole process of choosing the best actress was a let-down. I thought to myself that I have done a role, the likes of which I’m not sure if I can pull off again.

— Sengupta on her not winning the National Award for Best Actress for her role in Rajkahini (2015)

She featured opposite Prosenjit Chatterjee in Praktan (2016).

The poster for the Amitabh Bhattacharjee starrer jatra, Ekaler Karnaarjun (2017) claimed Sengupta to be the director. Sengupta negated that it was a misrepresentation while Indrajit Chakraborty, another actor of that jatra claimed that she was the guest director. She featured alongside Roopa Ganguly and Indrani Haldar in Aaro Ekbar (2017). Her Baranda (2017) was commercial disaster.

She won critical favour for her role as Chandrima Mukherjee in Prakash Bharadwaj's Colours of Life (2018). She featured as Sohini in Agnidev Chatterjee's Gaheen Hriday (2018) alongside Kaushik Sen playing Anupam. The film is based on the novel of the same name by Suchitra Bhattacharya. Her performance in the film was appreciated by critics. In Kamaleshwar Mukherjee's Goodnight City (2018) she featured as psychiatrist Abhiri Chatterjee who implores her husband who is a deputy commissioner with the detective department, not to be hard on the protagonist, a murderer whom she believes to be a psychologically distraught person. Her performance failed to win critical favour. The Times of India wrote on her performance, "she shows the compassionate side of her character nicely, the unemotional and professional psychiatrist goes missing every now and then." The film became another box office debacle. She played Kabita, an actress in Alamgir's Ekti Cinemar Golpo (2018). Viewers disliked her romantic collaboration with Arifin Shuvoo who is almost 15 years younger than her. Her performance in the film was deprecated by critics. The film became a major financial disaster.

She featured as a psychiatrist in Pritha Chakraborty's Mukherjee Dar Bou (2019). She had a fallout with the director of the film since the latter never fell into her suggestion to increase her screen time. The film turned out to be a major box office success. In Reshmi Mitra's Lime N Light (2019) she enacted double roles of Sreemoyee Sen, an actress and Archana Saha, a junior artiste. The junior artiste who is a lookalike of Sreemoyee Sen, takes her place after the latter met an accident. The Times of India wrote on her performance, "She is convincing as the naive Archana and confident as the superstar Sreemoyee." The film failed to draw viewers to the hall.

She received further critical acclaim for her role in Ahaa Re (2019). The movie was screened at the New York Indian Film Festival which was held virtually due to the COVID-19 Pandemic. Rituparna Sengupta was nominated for Best Actress. Thirdadvantagepoint.com listed her performance as the third best performance of the entire year. It was also listed as one of the best performances of the decade. The Times of India wrote in their review, "Rituparna gives Arifin and Paran Bandopadhyay a run for their money with her mature, measured performance as Basundhara — a woman whose past grief pushes her to put her heart and soul into cooking and caring for her family of three. Bhaskar Chattophadhyay from Firstpost wrote in his review: "Rituparna Sengupta is a treat to watch in this film. You have to see Sengupta in Ahaa Re to believe how much this is true. Every single frame of her cooking a dish, or even preparing to do so, is filled with so much love. Almost as if she is in a silent worship. Love, nourishment, gentleness, fondness – she defines these words with her performance. Her Basundhara is a woman who does not wear her emotions on her sleeves, but there is a scene towards the end of the film, when she can't take it anymore and just breaks down. Keep your handkerchiefs ready. Asianmoviepulse.com wrote in their review: "Rituparna Sengupta is a splendid actor and portrays the character of Basundhara with subtle emotional traits. The character goes through different shades and the director uses many close shots to capture her facial expressions perfectly."

In 2020 Sengupta starred in the Thriller The Parcel which was well received by critics and audiences. Bhaskar Chattophadhyay from Firstpost gave the film a positive review and called Senguptas performance brilliant: "The performances are superlative, though. Rituparna Sengupta is a strange mix of someone resigned to her fate in some matters, and at the same time, someone who can go to any extent to prevent any harm that might come to her family. By now, I am so used to seeing her excel in her roles, that I often commit the grave crime of overlooking the immense difficulties in playing a character as complicated as the one she does in this film. I am inclined to see that the lion's share of Parcel lies on her shoulders, and she is effortlessly brilliant in it. Rossini Sarkar from Cinestaan wrote in her review: Rituparna Sengupta carries the film on her shoulders, gradually creating her state of depression through perpetual tension, unreasonable outbursts and a haggard look. Her expressions in close-up are outstanding.

In 2022, Sengupta appeared in Belashuru, the sequel to the popular family drama Belasheshe. She will also be starring in her new women-centric crime thriller, Antardrishti directed by Kabir Lal. The latter is shot in four languages wherein Sengupta plays a double role in the Bengali version. Sengupta starred in the role of Bijaya in Nirmal Chakraborty's Datta based on Sarat Chandra Chatterjee's novel of the same name.

== Personal life ==
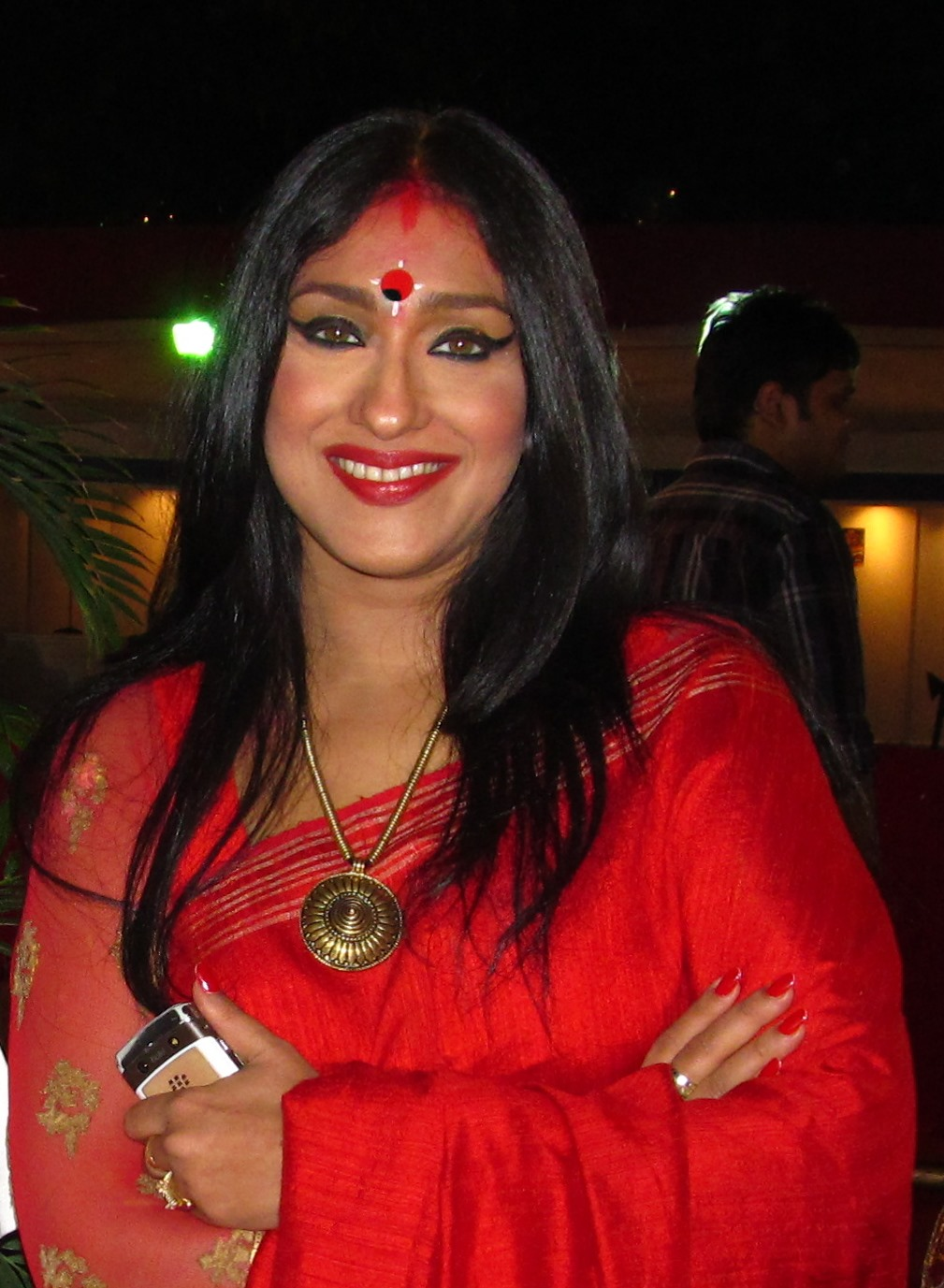
Rituparna Sengupta in Mumbai during Durga Puja in 2012

She married her childhood friend Sanjay Chakrabarti, founder and CEO of MobiApps on 13 December 1999 in Munshigonj and the couple has a son named Ankan and a daughter named Rishona Niya.

Sengupta has a deferential attitude to Debashree Roy whereas her attitude towards Satabdi Roy is oscillating. The relationship between the two got sour during the shooting of Prashanta Nanda's Laal Paan Bibi (1994) when Sengupta literally broke drown into tears after she was denounced for coming late to the set of the film, by Roy who was the bigger star by then. Roy cast Sengupta as the female lead in her directorial venture Om Shanti (2012). Both the actresses were interrogated whether their professional rivalry would affect the making of the film. Both of them denied such rivalry. Sengupta later claimed that she had been given lesser importance in the poster of the film while Roy said that the former's grievance is meaningless. Sengupta was absent at the premier show of the film, which generated the speculation in the media that the duo were no longer in talking terms. In April 2014, the duo were spotted talking again at a quiz contest conducted by Anandabazar Patrika.

== In media ==
In August, 2023, at the press conference of Anonno Mamun's new film Sporsho, Sengupta was interrogated by a Bangladeshi journalist how she can manage to portray the romantic lead opposite a much younger hero at the age of 52. She was infuriated with this interrogation and claimed herself to be evergreen.

Why would audience have problem to see me portraying a romantic lead opposite a young actor when then have no problem watching an elderly actor portraying a romantic lead opposite a young actress?

— Sengupta on how she can manage to portray a romantic lead opposite a younger actor when she herself is 52 year old.

Sengupta further added that people should enjoy watching her portraying romantic lead opposite a much younger hero when they do not have objection while watching an elderly hero portraying romantic lead opposite a young actress. She later claimed that an Indian journalist would have lost his job if he ever had made such interrogation.

Rituparna Sengupta was heavily trolled at the premiere of her film Nevermind (2026) for wearing a fitted purple gown leading to a wider speculation that the actress was gerascophobiac. Social media users targeted the actress, claiming that her choice of clothing did not match her age or body type. Many trolls argued that mature, senior actresses should dress modestly according to their age and body. Some critics felt that instead of highlighting her role as the lead actress and producer of the film, she created an unwanted distraction.

== Controversy ==
On 19 July 2019, Sengupta was interrogated by ED officers about an amount of near about 7 crore that she had received from the Rose Valley Group led by Gautam Kundu.

In the 2020 controversial vlog Let's Expose Face It, Sreelekha Mitra said that Sengupta wanted to play the lead in Tolly Lights that features Mitra as the protagonist. Mitra said that Sengupta made a phone call to Arjun Chakraborty, the director of the film and requested him to cast herself replacing Mitra.

On 21 June 2024, she was summoned by ED for in the connection of Food Smuggling scam.

"I am ashamed to watch the drama of people in the industry. Those who call this event ‘non-political’ to save their own backs, without ripping off the people at the top. And those who make videos playing the conch or crying, they are doing a lot of injustice. They are disrespectful to the victim and her parents, disrespectful to the entire movement. It should be strongly condemned."

— Sreelekha Mitra on the protest conducted by Sengupta and Rachna Banerjee in respect of 2024 Kolkata rape and murder incident

On 15 August 2024, Sengupta posted a video of blowing out a conch shell in favour of justice for the victim of the 2024 Kolkata rape and murder. It was evident in the video that the conch sound was added as the background score and she did not blow the conch shell. The video at once led to public denunciation and Sengupta later deleted the video.

Sengupta joined Reclaim the Night movement but had to leave abruptly as she was denounced by the mob who raised 'go back' slogan against her.

== Awards and honors ==
Year	Award
1993	Kalakar Award for Best Supporting Actress, Swet Pathorer Thala
1995	Bharat Nirman Award
1996	Kazi Nazrul Islam Birth Centenary Award by the Law Society of Calcutta
1997	Kalakar Award for Best Actress, Abujh Mon
1998	Kalakar Special Award for Moner Manush
1998	National Film Award for Best Actress for Dahan
1999	BFJA – Best Actress Award
1999	Anandalok Puraskar for Best Actress for Dahan
2000	Anandalok Puraskar for Best Supporting Actress for Attiya Sajan
2001	Kalakar Award for Best Actress, Sasurbari Zindabad
2004	Kalakar Award for Best Actress, Mondo Meyer Upakhyan
2004	BFJA – Best Actress Award for Alo
2005	Anandalok Puraskar for Best Glamour Queen
2006	BFJA – Best Actress Award for Trishna
2006	Kalakar Award for Best Actress, Dwitiya Basanta
2007	Anandalok Puraskar for Best Actress for Anuranan
2007	Kalakar Award for Best Actress, Batikrami
2008	Kalakar Award for Best Actress, Anuranan
2009	Kalakar Award for Best Actress, Mon Amour
2010	Kalakar Award for Best Actress, Aaynate
2013	BFJA - Best Actress Award for Muktadhara
2014	Filmfare Critics Award for Best Actress, Alik Sukh
2017	Filmfare Critics Award for Best Actress, "Praktan"
2017	Zee Bangla Sonar Sansar Award for Priyo Somporko, "Home Minister Bouma"
2022	Banga Bhushan
2025	WBFJA - Best Actress Award for Ajogyo
2025	Anandalok Puraskar for contribution in Bengali cinema Aalekh Foundation Women Achiever’s Award 2025
2026	Women Empowerment Award
2026	Anandalok Puraskar for Best Actress (Critics) for Korpur

== Bibliography ==
- Prakashan, Aajkaal (1989). Television. Aajkaal.
