= Agnidev Chatterjee =

Bengali film director

- Born: Calcutta, West Bengal, India
- Occupation: Film director

Agnidev Chatterjee is a Bengali film and television director and producer. His films include Babloo Bachelor, Tere Ane Se, Gaheen Hriday, Dark Chocolate, A Political Murder, Mrs Sen, 3 Kanya, Charuulata 2011, and Probhu Nashto Hoi Jai.

Chatterjee started his career with the 1987 Bengali serial Chaudhury Pharmaceuticals. In 2007, Chatterjee made the film Prabhu Nashto Hoi Jai which was premiered at Kolkata Film Festival and screened at the Kerala Film Festival. In 2012, he released the film Charuulata 2011, which dealt with extra-marital relationships. In November 2012, his film Teen Kanya released which tells a story of lives of three women.

== Filmography ==
Year	Title	Note	Ref.
2007	Prabhu Nashto Hoi Jai		
2012	Charuulata 2011		
2012	3 Kanya		
2013	Mrs. Sen		
2013	A Political Murder		
2014	Tere Ane Se	Hindi film; Unreleased	
2016	Dark Chocolate	Dual Language	
2018	Goheen Hriday		
2018	Jihad		
2018	Babloo Bachelor		

== Television director ==
- Chaudhury Pharmaceuticals (Daily soap) (1987)
- "Noukadubi" (Daily soap) (1993)
- "Din Pratidin" (Daily soap) (2001)
- "Ebar Pujo" (Daily soap) (2001)
- "Voter Lorai Parai Parai" (2001)
- "Jhankar" (2001)
- "Nir Khonje Mon" (Daily soap) (2002)
- "Kon She Alor Shopno Nia" (Daily soap) (2003)
- "Kobe Je Kothay" (Daily soap) (2003)
- "Kothay Pabo Tare" (Daily soap) (2003)
- "Sargam"(2007)
- "Shanai" (Daily soap) (2007)
- "Prabhani Ei Samay" (Daily soap) (2007)
- "Kaal" (Daily soap) (2007)
- "Gupto Porar Shupto kotha" (Daily soap) (2008)
- "Ki Ashaye Bandhi Khela Ghar" (Daily soap) (2009)
- "Dadamoni" (Daily soap) (2010)
- "MAN ME HAI VISHWAS" (FOUR EPISODES) (2018)
- "BAJLO TOMAR ALOR BENU" (Daily soap) (2019)
