= Padma (given name) =

Female given name

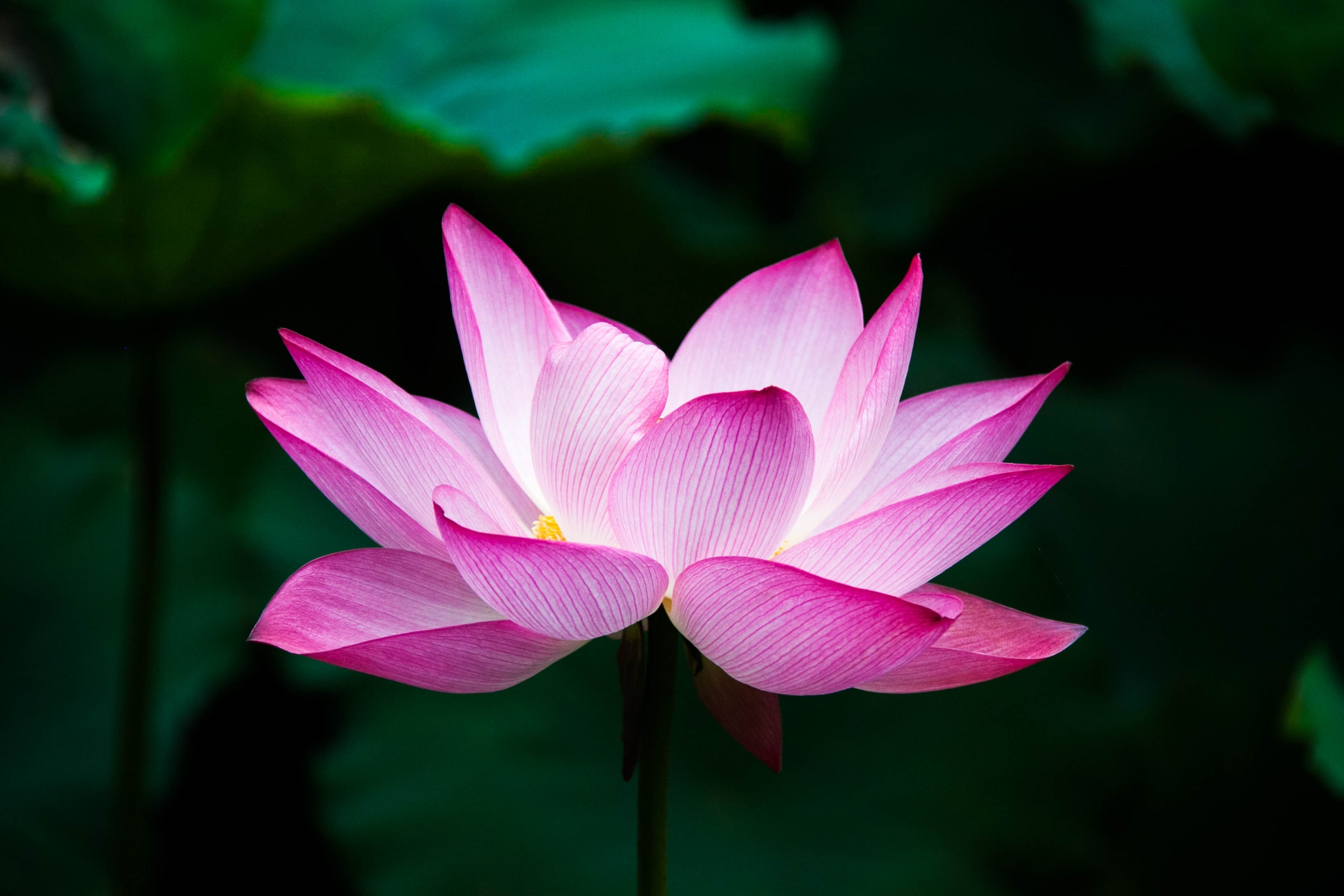
- An Indian lotus flower.
- Gender: Unisex
- Language: Sanskrit

Origin
- Meaning: “Lotus”

Padma is a given name of Sanskrit origin meaning “lotus.” Padma is another name of Lakshmi, the consort of the Hindu god Vishnu. Padma is the consort of Kalki, a future avatar of Vishnu in Hindu eschatology. The lotus flower is symbolic in religions such as Hinduism, Buddhism, and Jainism.

The related name of Star Wars character Padmé Amidala might have been based on the name Padma or on the Sanskrit mantra Om mani padme hum. Padmé is also in use in the Anglosphere as an independent given name.

== Women ==
- Padma (politician) (born 1945), Indian medical doctor and politician
- Padma Desai (1931 – 2023), Indian-American development economist
- Padma Gole (1913–1998), Indian Marathi poet
- Padma Khanna (born 1949), Indian actress, dancer and director
- Padma Lakshmi (née Vaidynathan; born 1970), Indian-born American television personality, model, author, producer, businesswoman, and activist
- Padma Narsey Lal (born 1951), Fijian ecological economist
- Padma Sachdev (1940 – 2021), Indian poet and novelist
- Padma Talwalkar (born 1949), Indian classical vocalist
- Padma Viswanathan, Canadian playwright and fiction writer

== Men ==
- Padma Choling (born 1952), Chinese retired politician of Tibetan ethnicity
- Padma Kant Shukla (1950 – 2013), Indian astrophysicist

== Fictional characters ==
- Padma Patil, a fictional character from the Harry Potter books
- Padma, a fictional character in the Indian films Bishorjan (2017) and Bijoya (2019) played by Jaya A

== See also ==
- Padmé Amidala, a fictional character in the Star Wars franchise
