= 4th Filmfare Awards Bangla =

Indian film awards

- Date: 31 March 2021
- Site: ITC Royal Bengal, Kolkata
- Hosted by: Anirban Bhattacharya; Arpita Chatterjee; Parambrata Chatterjee
- Organized by: The Times Group
- Official website: Filmfare Awards Bangla 2020

Highlights
- Best Film: Vinci Da
- Best Director: Kaushik Ganguly for Jyeshthoputro
- Best Actor: Prosenjit Chatterjee for Gumnaami
- Best Actress: Subhashree Ganguly for Parineeta; Swastika Mukherjee for Shah Jahan Regency
- Best Critic: Robibaar
- Most awards: Nagarkirtan (4)
- Most nominations: Robibaar (10)

Television coverage
- Network: Colors Tv Bangla

The 4th Filmfare Awards Bangla ceremony, presented by The Times Group, honoured the best Bengali language Indian films of 2019. The ceremony was held on 31 March 2021 in Kolkata.

Robibaar led the ceremony with 10 nominations, winning 3 awards including Best Film Critics' (for Atanu Ghosh) and Best Actress Critics' (for Jaya Ahsan). It was followed by Parineeta with 7 nominations, winning Best Actress (for Subhashree Ganguly). Nagarkirtan emerged as the most awarded film, with wins including Best Actor Critics' (for Riddhi Sen).

Swastika Mukherjee received dual nominations for Best Actress and Best Supporting Actress, eventually winning the former (also shared by Subhashree Ganguly).

== Ceremony ==
The ceremony was held at the ITC Royal Bengal, Kolkata. Joy was announced to the title sponsor by Jitesh Pillai, the editor of Filmfare, at a press conference held prior to the ceremony. While Anirban Bhattacharya, Arpita Chatterjee and Parambrata Chatterjee served as the co-hosts, Ishaa Saha, Madhumita Sarcar and Sauraseni Maitra performed at the ceremony.

== Winners and nominees ==
The nominations were announced by Filmfare on 29 March 2021.

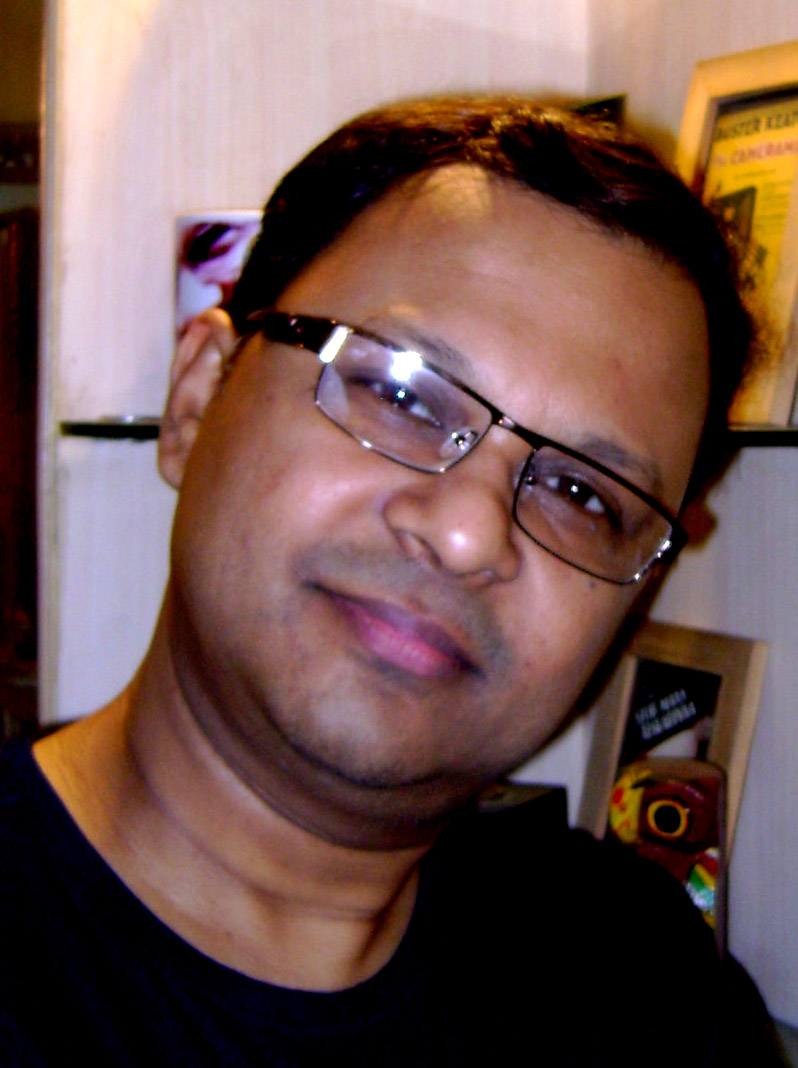
Atanu Ghosh, Best Director Critics

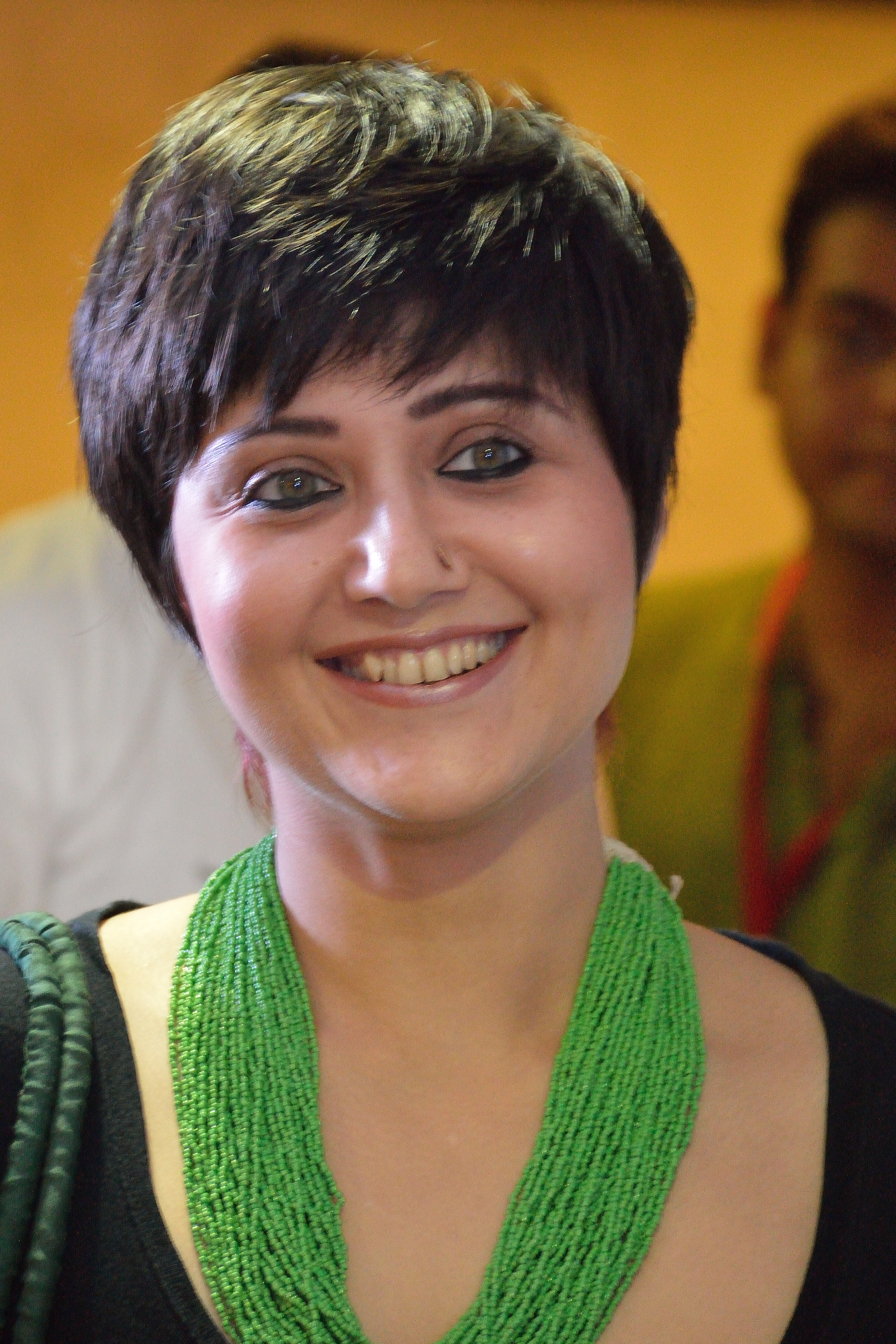
Swastika Mukherjee, Best Actress co-winner

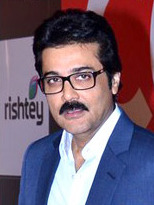
Prosenjit Chatterjee, Best Actor

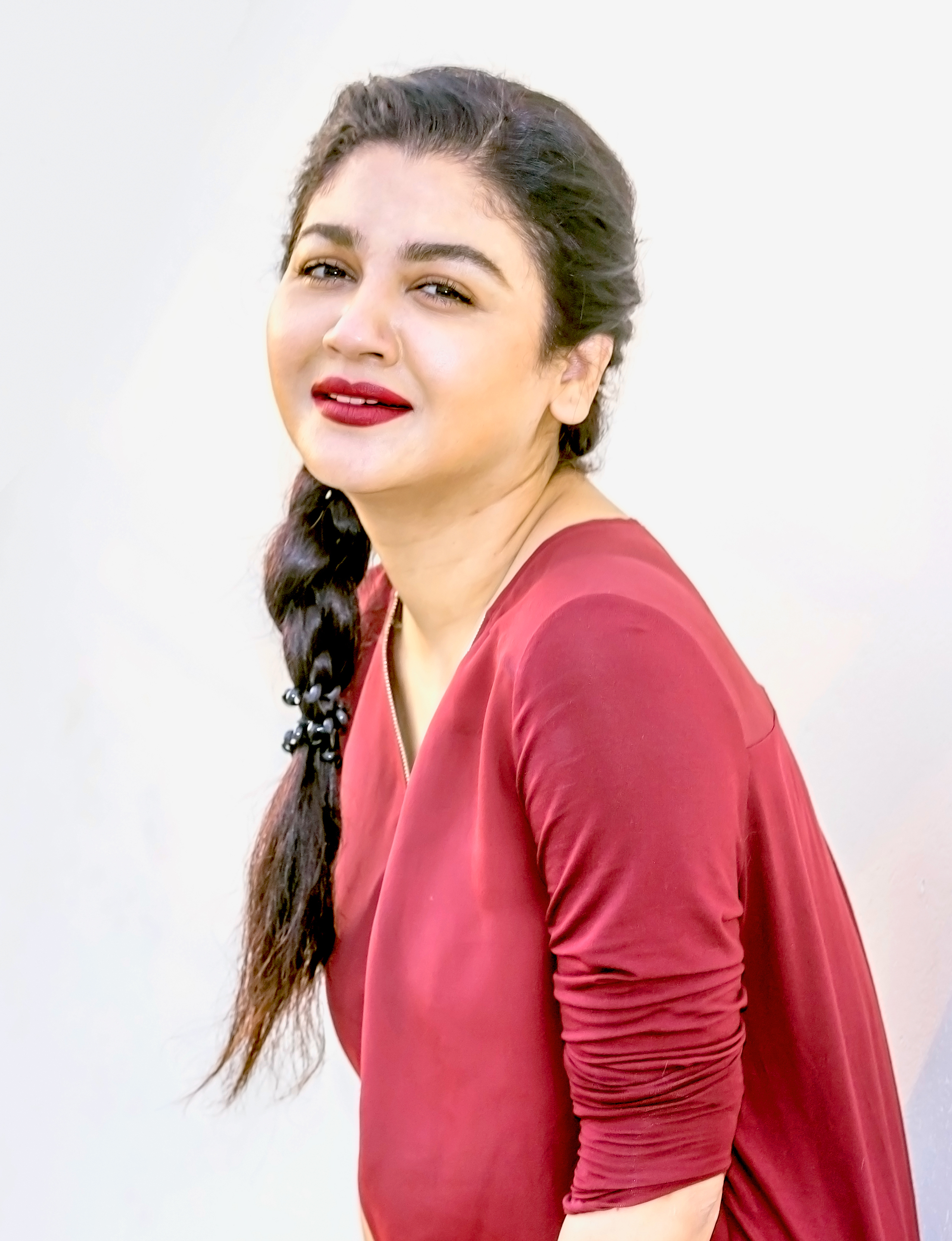
Jaya Ahsan, Best Actress Critics

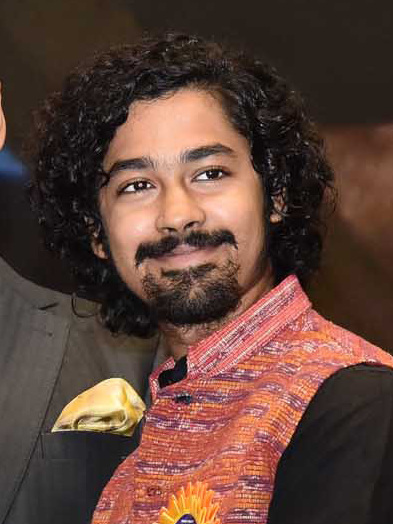
Riddhi Sen, Best Actor Critics

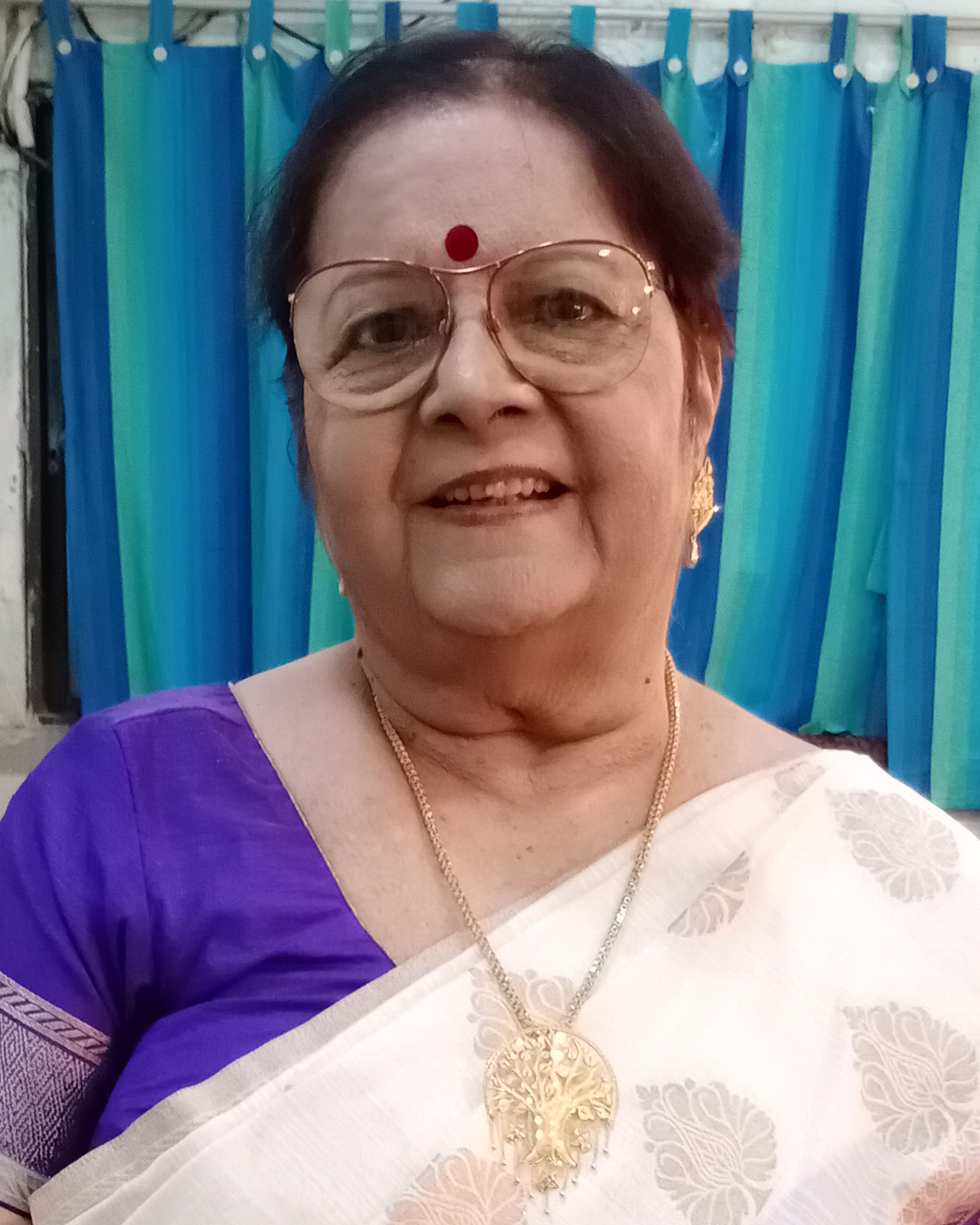
Lily Chakravarty, Best Supporting Actress

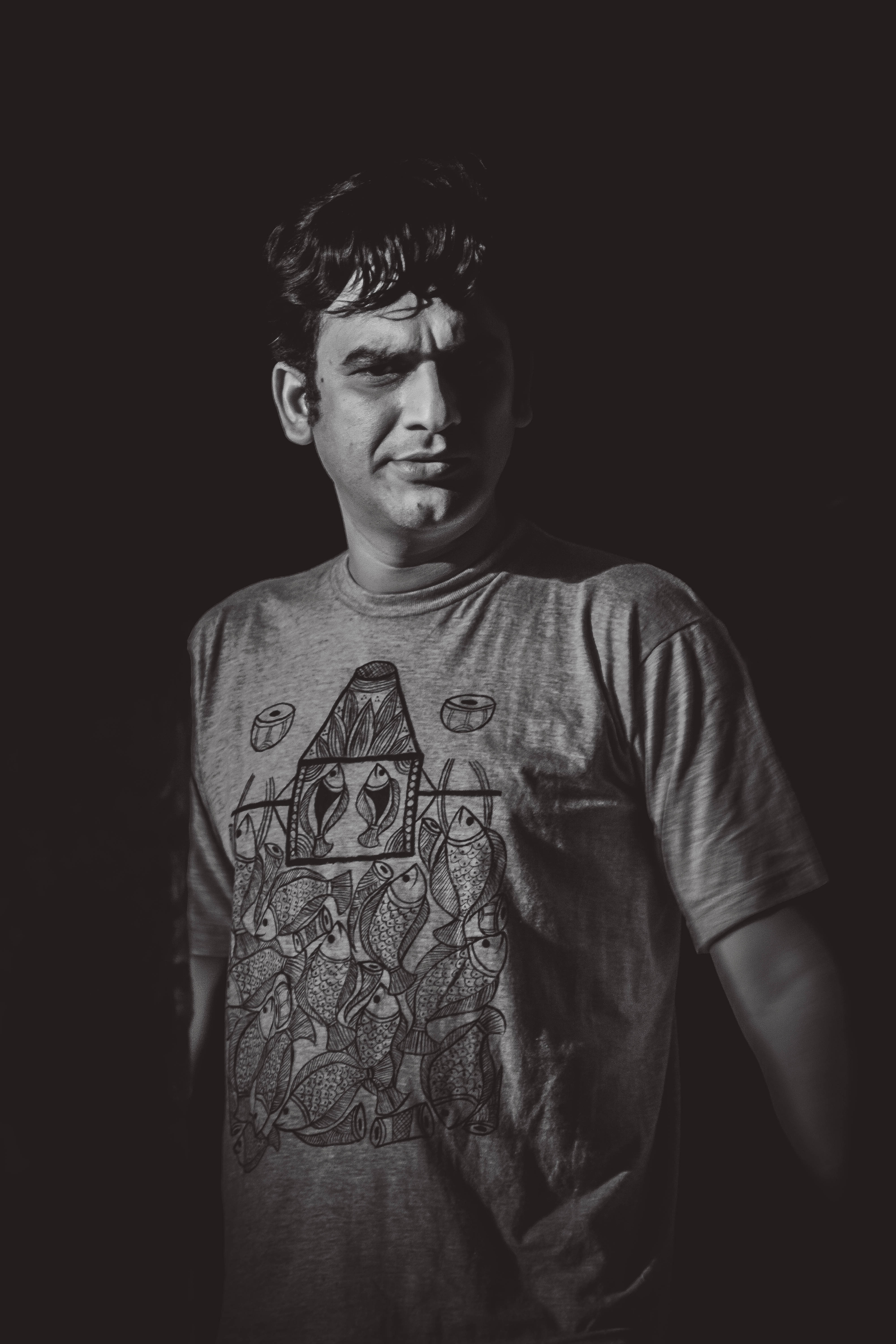
Ritwick Chakraborty, Best Supporting Actor co-winner

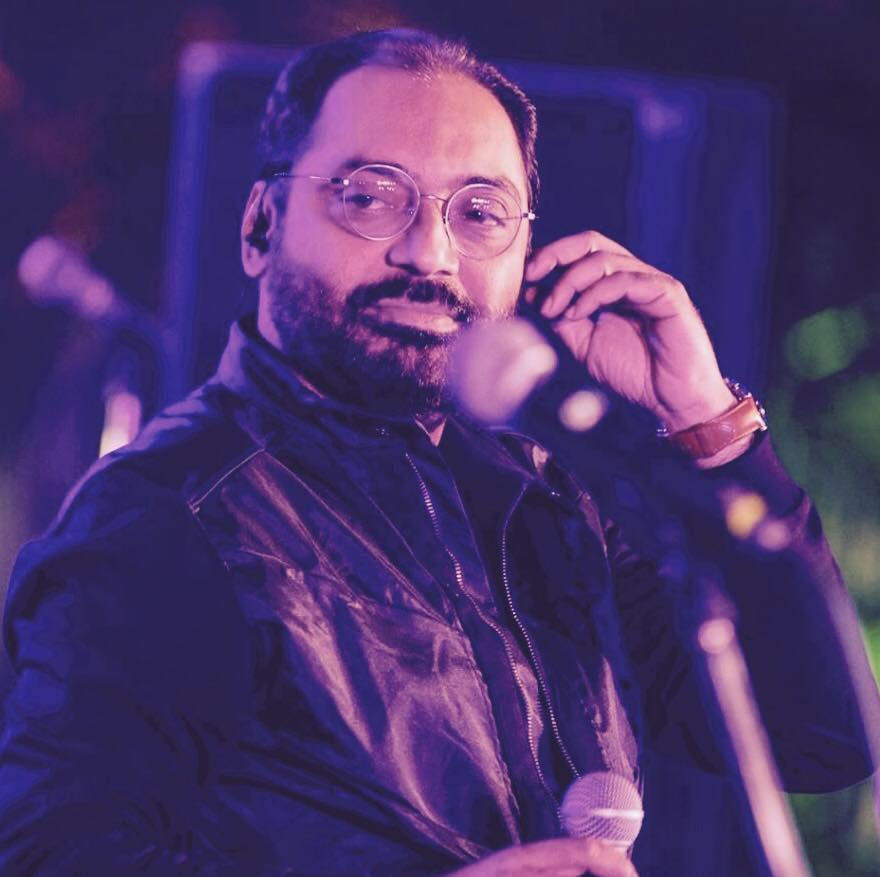
Anindya Chatterjee, Best Music Composer

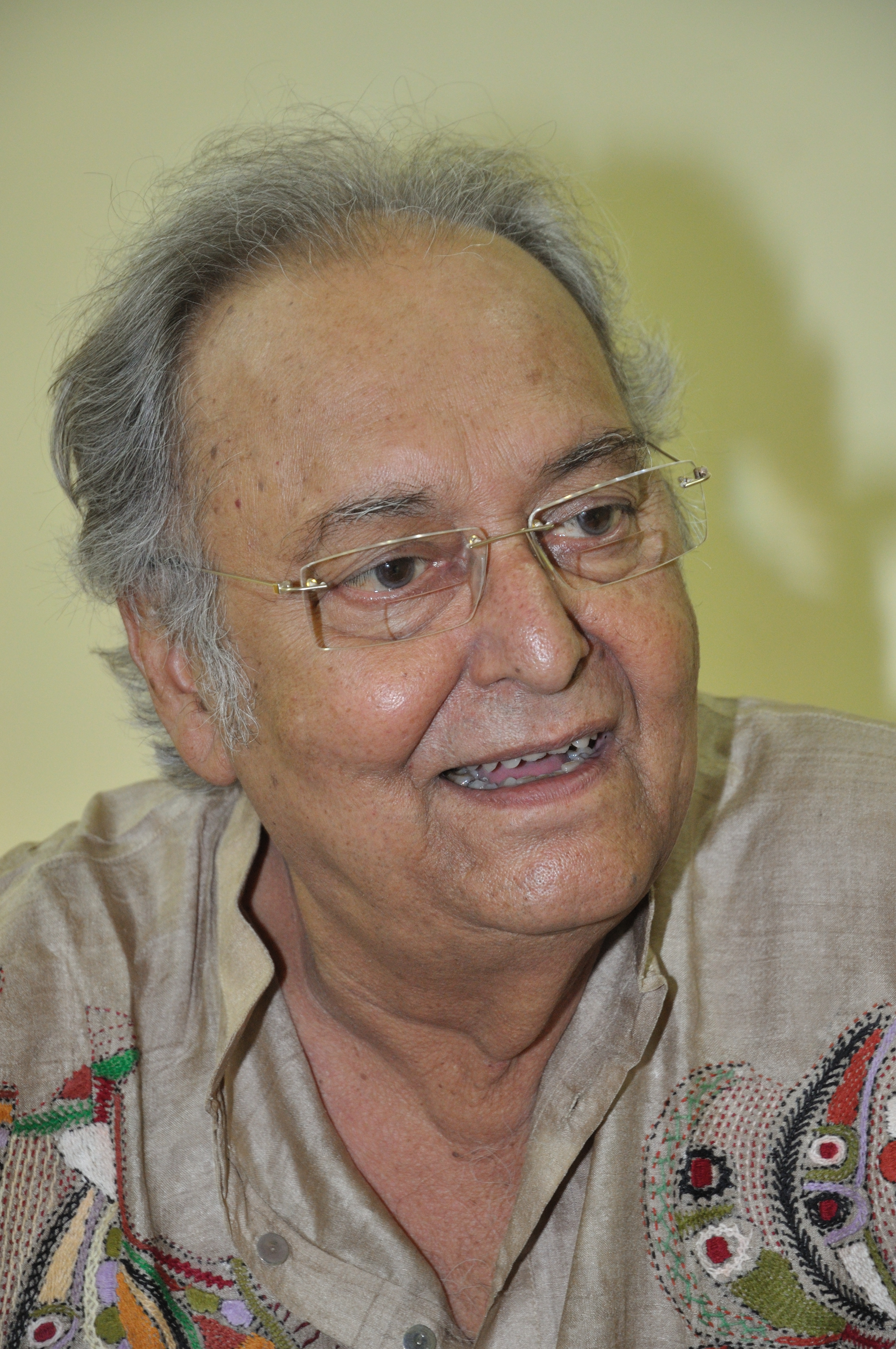
Soumitra Chatterjee, Lifetime Achievement

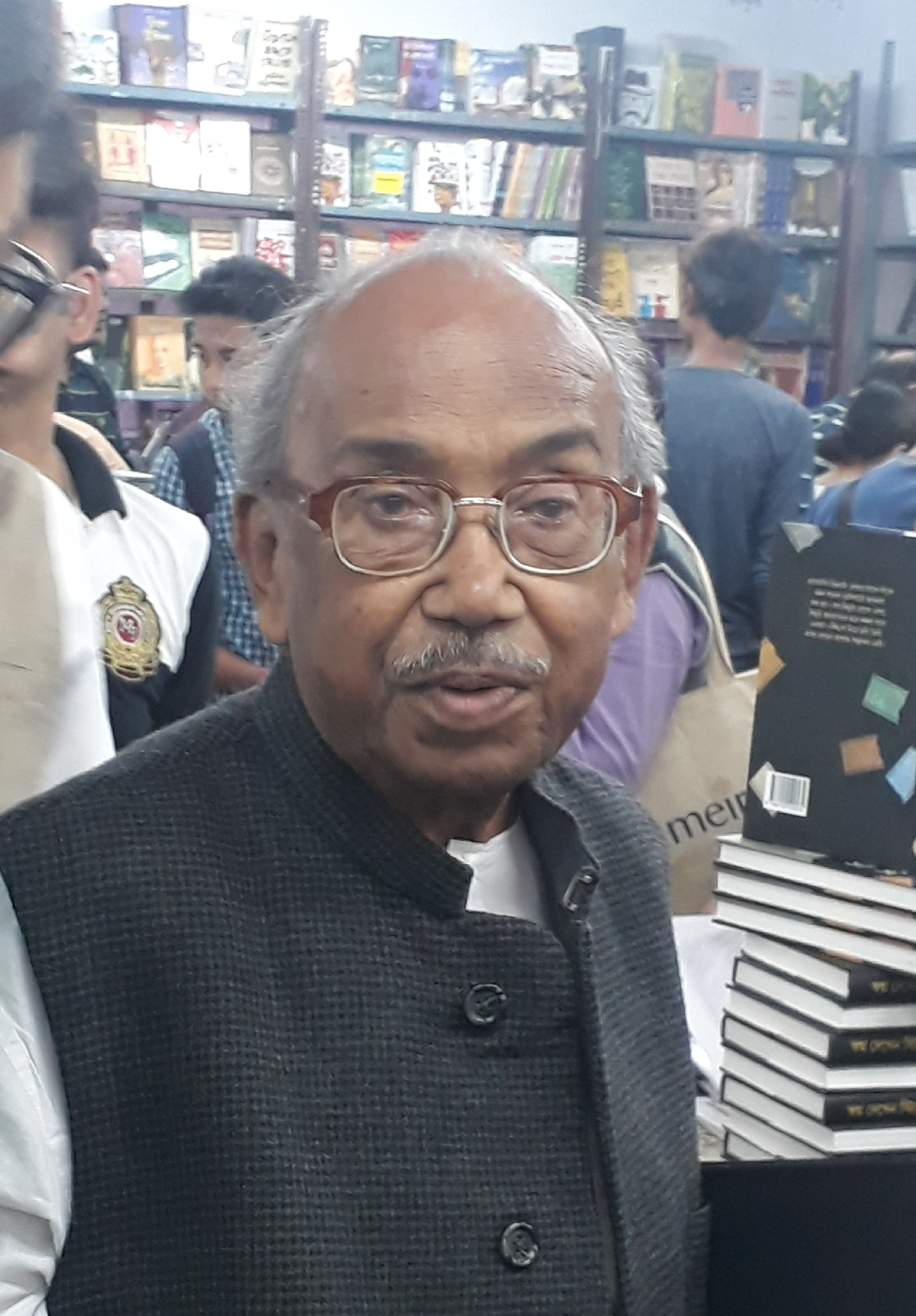
Tarun Majumder, Lifetime Achievement

=== Popular Awards ===
Best Film		Best Director
Vinci Da – Shree Venkatesh Films; Gumnaami – Shree Venkatesh Films; Konttho – Windows Production; Mitin Mashi – Camellia Production; Parineeta – Raj Chakraborty Entertainment; Sanjhbati – Bengal Talkies		Kaushik Ganguly – Jyeshthoputro; Arindam Sil – Mitin Mashi; Leena Gangopadhyay & Saibal Bannerjee – Sanjhbati; Nandita Roy & Shiboprosad Mukherjee – Konttho; Raj Chakraborty – Parineeta; Srijit Mukherji – Gumnaami
Best Actor		Best Actress
Prosenjit Chatterjee – Gumnaami as Subhash Chandra Bose / Gumnaami Baba; Abir Chatterjee – Shah Jahan Regency as Samiran Bose; Dev – Sanjhbati as Chandan Chatterjee (Chandu); Parambrata Chatterjee – Shah Jahan Regency as Rudra Mukherjee; Rudranil Ghosh – Vinci Da as Vinci Da; Shiboprosad Mukherjee – Konttho as RJ Arjun Mullick		Subhashree Ganguly – Parineeta as Mehul Bose; Swastika Mukherjee – Shah Jahan Regency as Kamalini Guha; Koel Mallick – Mitin Mashi as Mitin Mashi; Paoli Dam – Konttho as Preetha A. Mullick; Rituparna Sengupta – Ahaa Re as Basundhara Ganguly
Best Supporting Actor		Best Supporting Actress
Ritwick Chakraborty – Jyeshthoputro as Partho Ganguly; Anirban Bhattacharya – Gumnaami as Chandrachur Dhar; Jisshu Sengupta – Ghawre Bairey Aaj as Sandip Jha; Paran Bandopadhyay – Ahaa Re as Atanu Ganguly; Rahul Banerjee – Rajlokhi O Srikanto as Hukumchand; Rudranil Ghosh – Kedara as Keshto		Lily Chakravarty – Sanjhbati as Sulekha Mitra; Aparajita Ghosh Das – Rajlokhi O Srikanto as Annada; Daminee Benny Basu – Jyeshthoputro as Parul Ganguly; Sauraseni Maitra – Finally Bhalobasha as Ahiri; Swastika Mukherjee – Kia and Cosmos as Dia Chatterjee
Debut Awards
Best Female Debut		Best Debut Director
Ritwika Pal – Kia and Cosmos as Kia Chatterjee		Indraadip Dasgupta – Kedara
Writing Awards
Best Story	Best Screenplay	Best Dialogue
Rudranil Ghosh & Srijit Mukherji – Vinci Da; Atanu Ghosh – Robibaar; Churni Ganguly – Tarikh; Kaushik Ganguly – Jyeshthoputro; Kaushik Ganguly – Nagarkirtan; Ranjan Ghosh – Ahaa Re	Kaushik Ganguly – Nagarkirtan; Atanu Ghosh – Robibaar; Kaushik Ganguly – Jyeshthoputro; Srijato – Kedara; Srijit Mukherji – Vinci Da	Kaushik Ganguly – Jyeshthoputro; Padmanabha Dasgupta – Parineeta; Ranjan Ghosh – Ahaa Re; Shieladitya Moulik – Sweater; Srijit Mukherji – Shah Jahan Regency

=== Critics' awards ===
Best Film (Best Director)
Robibaar – Atanu Ghosh; Ghawre Bairey Aaj – Aparna Sen; Kedara – Indraadip Dasgupta; Nagarkirtan – Kaushik Ganguly; Rajlokhi O Srikanto – Pradipta Bhattacharya
Best Actor	Best Actress
Riddhi Sen – Nagarkirtan as Parimal (Puti); Jisshu Sengupta – Mahalaya as Uttam Kumar; Kaushik Ganguly – Kedara as Narasingha; Prosenjit Chatterjee – Robibaar as Asimava; Ritwick Chakraborty – Rajlokhi O Srikanto as Srikanto	Jaya Ahsan – Bijoya as Padma Haldar & Robibaar as Sayani Sen; Ishaa Saha – Sweater as Tulika (Tuku); Raima Sen – Tarikh as Ira Gupta; Sohini Sarkar – Vinci Da as Jaya A. Bose; Subhashree Ganguly – Parineeta as Mehul Bose
