= Padma (disambiguation) =

The Padma is a major river in Bangladesh.

Padma may also refer to:

== Common meanings ==
- Padma (attribute), the lotus, a symbolic flower repeatedly referred to in Buddhism, Hinduism, and Jainism
- Padma, another name of Lakshmi, the consort of the Hindu god Vishnu
- Padma, the consort of Kalki, a future avatar of Vishnu in Hindu eschatology
- Padma, in the Indian numbering system equal to one quadrillion (10^{15})

== People ==
- Padma (given name)
- Padma Choling (born 1952), Chairman of the Tibet Autonomous Region (TAR), China
- Padma Desai (born 1932), Indian-American development economist
- Padma Gole (1913–1998), Marathi poet from Maharashtra
- Padma Khanna (born 1949), popular actress of Bollywood and Bhojpuri cinema
- Padma Lakshmi (born 1970), a host of the reality TV program Top Chef
- Padma Narsey Lal (born 1951), Fijian ecological economist
- Padma Sachdev (1940–2021), Indian writer, novelist in Dogri
- Padma Kant Shukla (1950–2013), Indian physicist
- Padma Talwalkar (born 1948), Indian classical vocalist
- Padma Viswanathan (born 1968), Canadian playwright
- Padma (politician) (born 1945), Indian politician

== Places ==
- Padma, Hazaribagh (community development block), Jharkhand, India
- Padma, Hazaribagh, Jharkhand, India

== Other uses ==
- Padma Purana, a Hindu religious text, one of the major eighteen Puranas
- Padma Patil, a fictional character from the Harry Potter books
- Padma, a fictional character in the Indian films Bishorjan (2017) and Bijoya (2019) played by Jaya Ahsan

== See also ==
- Padme (disambiguation)
