= Padam =

Padam may refer to:

- Padam, Ladakh, India
- Padam people, of India
- Padam (musical composition), in Carnatic music of South India
- Southern Command (Israel) (Pikud Darom or Padam)

== See also ==
- Padam Padam (disambiguation)
- Padma (disambiguation)
- Pada (disambiguation)
