= Pada =

Pada(s) may refer to:

== Places ==
- Pada (river), Estonia
- Pada, Estonia, a village
- Padar, Indonesia, or Pada, an island
- Padas (federal constituency), Sabah, Malaysia
- Padas River, Malaysia
- Sri Pada or Adam's Peak, a mountain in Sri Lanka

== Other uses ==
- Pada (film), a 2022 Indian Malayalam-language political thriller
- Pada (foot), in Sanskrit grammar, and in Hindu and Buddhist tradition

== See also ==
- Padam (disambiguation)
- Padma (disambiguation)
