= Padmaja =

Padmaja may refer to

- Padmaja, an epithet of the Hindu goddess Lakshmi
- Padmaja Naidu, former Governor of West Bengal, India
- Padmaja Naidu Himalayan Zoological Park, park located in Darjeeling, West Bengal, India
- Padmaja Phenany Joglekar, Hindustani classical singer
- Padmaja Rao, an Indian actress, television director and producer

== See also ==
- Padma (disambiguation)
