= Sardar Barir Khela =

- Film poster
- Bengali: সর্দারবাড়ির খেলা
- Literally: Sardar Barir's Game
- Directed by: Rakhal Sabuj
- Written by: Anan Zaman
- Screenplay by: Anan Zaman
- Produced by: Mir Zahid Hasan
- Starring: Shobnom Bubly; Ziaul Roshan; Shahiduzzaman Selim; Azad Abul Kalam
- Cinematography: Farhad Hossain
- Edited by: Touhid Hossain Chowdhury
- Music by: Sajib Das; Shahriar Rafat
- Production company: Mrittika Chobighor
- Distributed by: Tiger Media
- Release date: 8 May 2026
- Country: Bangladesh
- Language: Bengali

Sardar Barir Khela (Bengali: সর্দারবাড়ির খেলা, lit. 'Sardar Barir's Game') is a 2026 Bangladeshi drama film. Produced by Mir Zahid Hasan under the banner of Mrittika Chobighor. The story, screenplay and dialogues are written by Anan Zaman and directed by Rakhal Sabuj. The lead roles are played by Shobnom Bubly, Ziaul Roshan, Shahiduzzaman Selim, Azad Abul Kalam and Ashiqur Rahman Lyon. The film tells the story of the folk cultural tradition of Lathi khela and the struggling lives of Lathial.

The film, which received a grant from the Government of the People's Republic of Bangladesh in the fiscal year 2022–23, was named 'Pulsiraat', later changed to 'Sardarbarir Khela'. Cinematography by Farhad Hossain, editing by Touhid Hossain Chowdhury . Music by Sajib Das and Shahriar Rafat, and music by Sudip Kumar Deep.

== Cast ==
- Shobnom Bubly as Tarulata
- Ziaul Roshan as Fulbor
- Shahiduzzaman Selim
- Azad Abul Kalam
- Ashiqur Rahman Lyon

== Production ==
The film was shot in various locations in the Indian border area of Nalitabari, Sherpur in 2025.

== Release ==
The film was released in Bangladeshi 23 theaters on 8 May 2026.
