= Shikhandi Kotha =

- Directed by: Mohammad Hannan
- Written by: Anan Zaman
- Produced by: Impress Telefilm Limited
- Starring: Rakhal Sobuj; Jayanta Chattopadhyay; Rokeya Prachy; Mirana Zaman
- Distributed by: Impress Telefilm Limited
- Release date: April 19, 2013
- Running time: 103 Minutes
- Country: Bangladesh
- Language: Bengali

Shikhandi Kotha (Bengali: শিখন্ডী কথা) is a 2013 Bangladeshi drama film directed by Mohammad Hannan and written by Anan Zaman. The film was produced by Impress Telefilm Limited and is based on the life of the third gender.

== Plot ==
Ramela gives birth to a son after having two daughters and Ramzed Molla and Ramela are happy as a result. Ramzed named him Ratan. But Ratan's physical changes later appear as those of a girl. His family refuse to accept his gender identity. He became an obstacle to his sister's marriage and his father scolds him. He then realizes that society will not accept him and joins a Hijra community. There he grows under the supervision of Kali Masi as Ratna.

== Cast ==
- Rakhal Sobuj - Ratan/Ratna
- Jayanta Chattopadhyay - Ramzed Molla
- Rokeya Prachy
- Mirana Zaman

== Awards ==
Meril Prothom Alo Awards

- Critics Choice Awards for Best Director - Mohammad Hannan
- Critics Choice Awards for Best Film Actor - Rakhal Sobuj
