= The Cage (2017 film) =

2017 film

- Film poster
- Bengali: খাঁচা
- Directed by: Akram Khan
- Written by: Akram Khan; Hasan Azizul Haque
- Starring: Jaya Ahsan
- Release date: 22 September 2017
- Country: Bangladesh
- Language: Bengali

The Cage (Bengali: Khacha) is a 2017 Bangladeshi drama film directed by Akram Khan. This film is based on Hasan Azizul Haque's "Ekoi Namer Golpo". It was selected as the Bangladeshi entry for the Best Foreign Language Film at the 90th Academy Awards, but it was not nominated. The screenplay was jointly written by Azad Abul Kalam and Akram Khan. The film was directed by Akram Khan.

== Plot ==
As British colonial rule ends in 1947, a Brahmin family decides to move from the newly formed Dominion of Pakistan to the Dominion of India.

== Cast ==
- Jaya Ahsan as Sarojini
- Azad Abul Kalam as Ambujakkho

== See also ==
- List of submissions to the 90th Academy Awards for Best Foreign Language Film
- List of Bangladeshi submissions for the Academy Award for Best Foreign Language Film
