= Alatchakra: Circle of Desire =

2021 film by Habibur Rahman

- Promotional poster
- Bengali: অলাতচক্র
- Directed by: Habibur Rahman
- Screenplay by: Habibur Rahman
- Based on: Alatchakra by Ahmed Sofa
- Produced by: Rahima Begum
- Starring: Jaya Ahsan; Ahmed Rubel; Mamunur Rashid; Azad Abul Kalam; Nusrat Jahan Jerry
- Narrated by: Ahmed Rubel
- Cinematography: Mazharul Islam Razu
- Edited by: Avijit Arko
- Production company: MISE En SCÈNE
- Distributed by: Jaaz Multimedia
- Release date: 19 March 2021
- Running time: 83 minutes
- Country: Bangladesh
- Language: Bengali
- Budget: ৳ 6 million

Alatchakra (Bengali: অলাতচক্র, romanized: Ôlatcôkrô, lit. 'Wheel of Fire'; also known in English as Circle of Desire) is a 2021 Bengali war–drama film, scripted and directed by Habibur Rahman. It was Rahman's debut feature film and is based on Ahmed Sofa's eponymous autobiographical novel. The film stars Jaya Ahsan, Ahmed Rubel, Mamunur Rashid, Azad Abul Kalam, Shilpi Sarker Apu, Nusrat Jahan Jerry, and Syed Mosharrof in the leading roles. Alatchakra was the first Bengali-language or Bangladeshi film to be released in 3D.

Set during the Bangladesh Liberation War, the film portrays the experiences of Ahmed, a young writer who takes refuge in Kolkata, and his love interest Tayeba, a cancer patient who suffers from leukemia. Alatchakra was produced by Rahima Begum under the banner of MISE En SCÈNE Productions, beginning with initial funding from the Bangladeshi government. The film was released in Bangladesh on 19 March 2021.

== Plot summary ==
The war of liberation is going on in Bangladesh. Meanwhile, Bangladeshi writer Ahmed (Ahmed Rubel) has taken refuge in a boarding house on Boubazar Street in Calcutta as a refugee along with other intellectuals, teachers and cultural activists. Although he wanted to go to the liberation war three times, he was rejected every time. He spends his days writing his diary and looking for a job in Kolkata's various printing media. Apart from watching the activities of Bangladeshi political figures who have taken refuge in Theater Road and other places in Calcutta, he is looking for Tayeba (Jaya Ahsan) who has taken refuge elsewhere in the city. Tayeba was once found at the PG Hospital in Calcutta. Ahmed arrived at the hospital to see admitted Tayeba, who is now sick and fighting leukemia. Tayeba and Ahmed spent their first time outside Bangladesh reminiscing about their time in Dhaka. Ahmed got acquainted with the doctor Maiti (Azad Abul Kalam) while staying in the hospital for more than the allotted time for the visitors. Tayeba wants to bring her a little rice and a small tengra fish curry cooked with cumin and turmeric with no pepper from Ahmed. Doctor Maiti is advised Tayeba to eat rice and fish secretly, otherwise senior doctor Bhattacharya may get angry if he hears. After getting out of the hospital, Dr. Maiti forbade Ahmed to add salt in curry, that Tayeba wanted to eat. It turns out that Ahmed didn't know anything about Tayeba's illness.

At hostel, Nareshda (Gazi Mahtab Hasan), Ahmed's close friend. Returning to boarding, Ahmed told Naresh that he had met Tayeba. Meanwhile, Tayyaba's younger sister Dora (Nusrat Jahan) sees Tayyaba with her husband. Naresh met two students who are going to Dehradun for training to join the war of liberation. Everyone has left their families in Bangladesh in the middle of the war, everyone is passionate about their families. War creates a whirlwind of emotions for their families. Cultural activists living in the boarding go to the Barasat refugee camp to perform. They also do the rehearsal of Munier Chowdhury's play 'Kabar' on the veranda of the hostel. For the next visit to Tayeba Ahmed wants to bring the food she ask for, so he requests Chitta, the hostel's cook to cook Tengra fish curry and rice with turmeric without salt, also paid for grocery and kitchen items. For some reason, Chitta never returned to boarding. Ahmed cooks himself. He goes to see Tayeba again with the cooked food. He went to the hospital and saw that Tayeba's bed had been given to another patient. Later he finds out that Tayeba is no more.

== Cast ==
Apart from the main protagonist in Alatchakra, students of dramatics in various universities have acted in various side characters.

- Ahmed Rubel
- Jaya Ahsan
- Mamunur Rashid
- Azad Abul Kalam
- Shilpi Sarkar Apu
- Nusrat Jahan Jerry
- Syed Mosharrof
- Akram Khan
- Gazi Mahtab Hasan
- Shafiul Alam Babu
- Sadika Parvin Swarna
- Mehraz Roni

== Production ==
Alatchakra is the first Bangladeshi film made in 3D. Habibur Rahman was inspired from Jean-Luc Godard's experimental 3D film Goodbye to Language. The film has got maximum grant of 6 million Taka from the Bangladesh Government in 2018.

=== Screenplay ===
Ahmed Sofa's novel Alatchakra is an autobiography that depicts the struggles of his refugee life in Calcutta during the freedom fight of Bangladesh. The book was first published in 1985. The original novel revolved around two characters- Daniel, a writer and a refugee from Dhaka, and Tayeba, a cancer patient. Novelist Sofa explores the undying affection for each other, the overall ups and downs of their utterly never expressing love relationship, the moral corruption of the politicians cooped up in Calcutta, and the perspectives of different communities with regard to the 1971 war. Habibur Rahman wrote the screenplay over a period of six years, focusing only on the love story of Daniel and Tayeba from the original novel. The protagonist of the novel 'Daniel' is kept as 'Ahmed' in the screenplay. It was one of five screenplays selected for Bangladesh Government grant in 2017.

=== Filming ===
The film was being shot in 3D using 3ality TS5 rig. Mazharul Raju was the cinematographer and Ripon Nath did the audio engineering of the film. The film is the first 3D film in the Bengali language. The shooting began in early 2019, completed in two lots. First lot of shooting was completed in 10 February. second stint was started on June, 22 and ended in December 2019. Story is based on 1970-s Calcutta, though entire principal photography is done in Old Dhaka and Infectious Diseases Hospital of Mymensingh. The post-production work was done in Mumbai amid the COVID-19 pandemic. Mumbai-based Skywork Studios gave the technical support to edit the film's stereoscopic 3D scenes.

== Promotion and release ==
The film was cleared for release by the Bangladesh Film Censor Board on 15 December 2020. The promotion campaign started in February 2021. Lead artists run campaigns through their social media. Shortly followed by releasing the first teaser trailer on 2 March, Jaya Ahsan confirmed the release date via her Facebook account. It was premiered in Dhaka at Star Cineplex on 18 March, later Jaaz Multimedia took the distribution rights and released it nationally on 19 March.

== Accolades ==
List of awards and nominations
Organization	Year	Category	Recipients & nominees	Result	Ref.(s)
Meril Prothom Alo Awards	2021	Best Film Actress (Popular Choice)	Jaya Ahsan	Won	
