= Lathi khela =

Traditional Bengali martial art

Lathi Khela
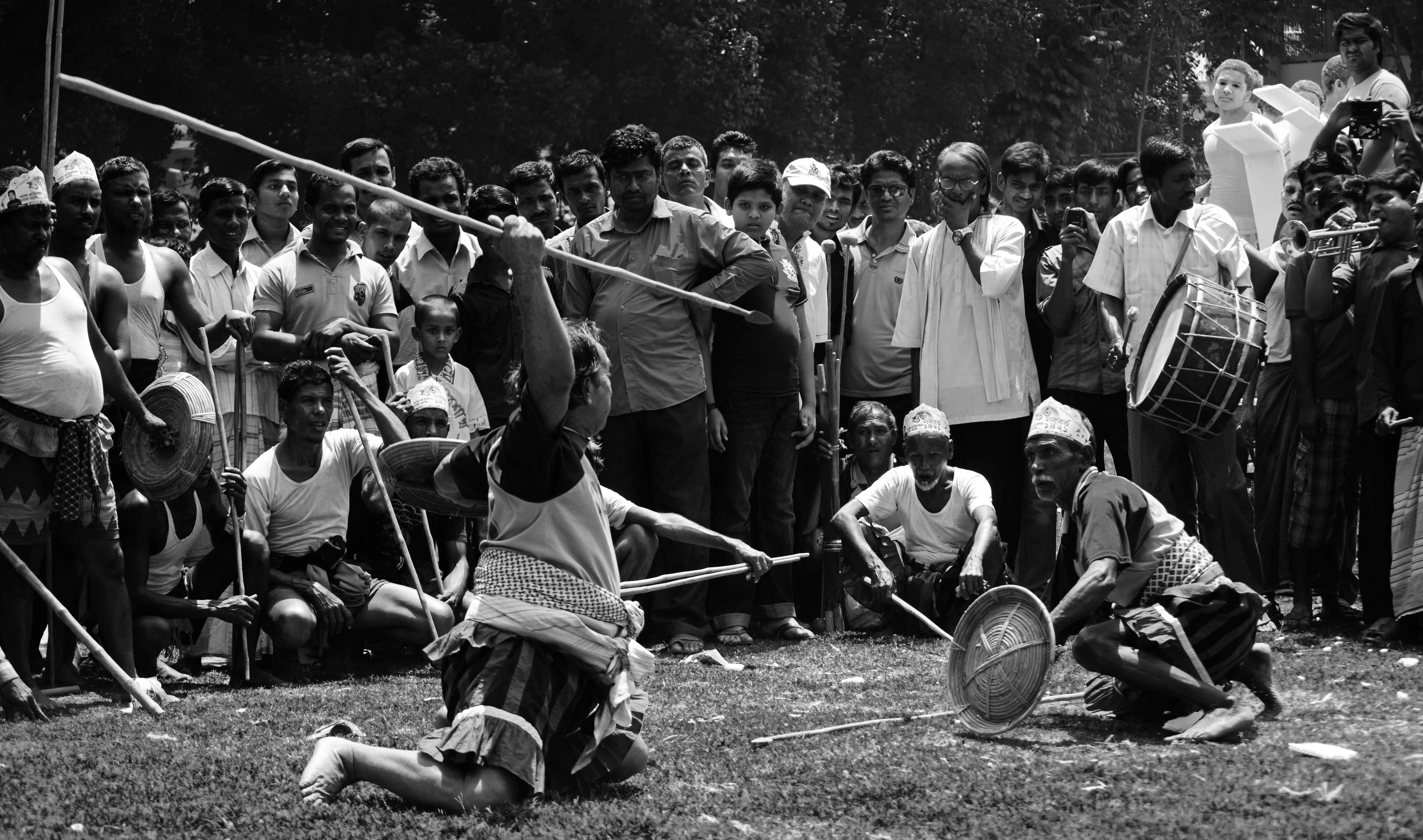
- Lathi khela competition in Bangladesh
- Focus: Stick fighting
- Country of origin: Bangladesh
- Famous practitioners: Pulin Behari Das
- Olympic sport: No
- Meaning: Staffplay

Lathi khela (Bengali: লাঠি খেলা) is a traditional Bengali martial art – a kind of stick fighting practiced in India and Bangladesh. A practitioner is known as a lathial. Lathi khela originated from the Bengal region in the Indian subcontinent.

== Etymology ==
The word lathi is the Bengali word meaning stick, while khela means a sport or game. Therefore, lathi khela translates as a game of sticks.

== Instruments ==
The lathi is normally made of the male bamboo and sometimes bound at short intervals with iron rings. A typical lathi measures 6 to 8 feet (2 to 2.4 m). Some, called bari, are shorter and may be wielded like a baton or bludgeon. In the past, sticks could be paired with shields, as can still be seen in nori bari (mock stick-fight) demonstrations.

== History ==
Rich farmers and other eminent people hired lathial for security and as a symbol of their power. Duels were used as a way to protect or take land and other possessions. A proverb in some South Asian languages is jiski lathi uski bhains meaning "whoever wields the lathi keeps the buffalo". Zamindars (feudal lords) sent groups of lathial to forcefully collect taxes from villagers. Lathi training was at one time included in the Bratachari system of education.

During the 19th century, organisers of the Hindu Mela came together to form a secret society, the Sanjivani Sabha, which manufactured swadeshi matchsticks and cloth woven in swadeshi looms. The Hindu mela also provided considerable exposure to indigenous physical sports. In the first session of the mela, renowned wrestlers in Calcutta were invited and awarded medals. In the following session, competitions for indigenous physical sports such as wrestling and Lathi khela, were organised. Various displays of Indian martial arts and survival techniques were also prominently featured at the mela.

Although Lathi khela is practised in Indian and Bangladeshi villages, urbanization has led to its decline as a rural martial art in recent decades. Until 1989, an annual nationwide lathi khela convention was held in Kushtia, Bangladesh, where troupes from all over the country took part. Due to the drop in practitioners and spectators, the convention is now held once every three years. Even in the districts where lathi troupes once flourished, only several now remain. Today, lathi khela is most often seen during festivals and weddings. Matches are held in West Bengal for certain puja rituals, and a similar sport called chamdi is played during Eid in North Bengal.

== Practice ==
Lathial group performed acts like Baoi Jhak (group fight), Nori Bari (mock fight with sticks), Fala Khela and Dao Khela (mock fight with sharp weapons), and Chhuri dance to music, in the presence of hundreds. These groups may learn the arts of dao khela (machete fighting) and fara khela (sword fighting), both of which are preserved today in the form of mock-fights. Matches are generally one-on-one, but the art includes mock-group fights, or baoi jhak. In lathi the centre of energy is the heart chakra, and practitioners fight in a more upright position.

== See also ==
- Boli Khela
- Lathial
- Lathi charge
- Lathmar Holi
- Sardar Barir Khela
