= Padme =

Padme (compare Sanskrit पद्म padma 'lotus') may refer to:

- Padmé Amidala, a fictional character in the Star Wars franchise
- Om mani padme hum, a mantra particularly associated with the four-armed Shadakshari form of Avalokiteśvara
- Phobos And Deimos & Mars Environment (PADME), a proposed Mars orbiter

== See also ==
- Padma (disambiguation)
- Pad (disambiguation)
