= Azad Abul Kalam =

Bangladeshi actor and director (born 1966)

- আজাদ আবুল কালাম
- Born: 26 October 1966 (age 59)
- Occupations: Actor, director, writer

Azad Abul Kalam (born 26 October 1966) is a Bangladeshi actor, director, writer and activist. He is one of the founders of Prachyanat and Prachyanat School of Acting and Design. He won Meril Prothom Alo Award for Best Playwright (Critics Choice) in 2012, for his television adaptation of Muhammed Zafar Iqbal’s novel, "Sabuj Velvet".

== Career ==
Kalam was associated with the theater group Aranyak since October 1985. His debut stage acting was the in play Nanoker Pala, directed by Abdullah Hel Mahmud. He founded a theater group Prachyanat in 1997.

Kalam acted in television drama plays.

== Works ==
=== Films ===
- Kittonkhola (2000) by Abu Sayeed
- Phulkumar (2002) by Ashique Mostafa
- Lalon (2004) by Tanvir Mokammel
- Meherjaan (2011) by Rubaiyat Hossain
- Guerrilla (2011) by Nasiruddin Yousuff
- Brihonnola (2014) Murad Parvez
- Krishnopokkho (2015) by Meher Afroz Shaon
- Khacha (2017) by Akram Khan
- Alatchakra: Circle of Desire (2021) by Habibur Rahman
- Gunin (2021) by Giasuddin Selim
- Jibon Pakhi (2022) by Asad Sarkar
- Maa (2023)
- Kajolrekha (2024)
- Jole Jwole Tara (2025)
- Tagar (2025)
- Silence: A Musical Journey (2025)
- Ekhane Rajnoitik Alaap Joruri (2026)
- Sardar Barir Khela (2026)
- Thikana Bangladesh (2026) post-production

=== TV ===
- Atoshi (1996) by Mansurul Aziz
- Zindabahar (2022)

=== Web series ===
- Nayan Rahasya (2019)

=== Theatre direction ===
- Circus Circus
- A Man for All Seasons.
- Koinna.
- Raja ... ebong Annanya
- Punorjonma. When We Dead Awaken
- Tragedy of Polashbari.
- Agunjatra.
- Achalayaton.
- Bou-Basanti.
- Half Akhrai.
