= Padam Padam =

Padam Padam may refer to:

- "Padam, padam...", a 1951 song by Édith Piaf
- "Padam Padam" (song), a 2023 single by Kylie Minogue
- Padam Padam (TV series), a 2011 South Korean television series
