= Jaya Ahsan =

Bangladeshi film actress, model, producer and playback singer

- জয়া আহসান
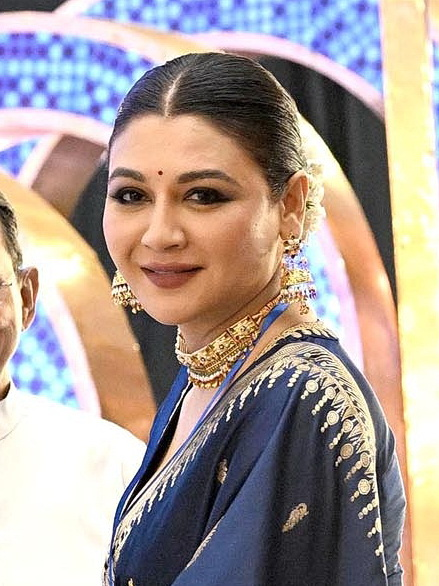
- Ahsan in 2023
- Pronunciation: [d͡ʒɔe̯a aɦsan]
- Born: Jaya Maswood; 1 July; Gopalganj, Dhaka, Bangladesh
- Occupations: Film actress; model; producer; playback singer
- Years active: 1997–present
- Spouse: Faisal Ahsan Ullah (m. 1998; div. 2012)
- Awards: Full list

Jaya Maswood, popularly known as Jaya Ahsan (Note: Bengali: জয়া আহসান, Bengali pronunciation: [d͡ʒɔe̯a aɦsan].) (Bengali: জয়া আহসান, pronounced [d͡ʒɔe̯a aɦsan]; born 1 July), (Note: Ahsan was born on 1 July, but sources disagree over the year. News18.com claims 1972. The Times of India used to list Ahsan's year of birth as 1972, but has since updated it to 1983. In a December 2019 interview, Ahsan described herself as "not more than a day of 37 years".) is a Bangladeshi film actress, model, producer and playback singer. Starting her career as a model and, later, as a film actress, she works mostly in Bangladeshi and Indian Bengali films. She won Bangladesh National Film Award for Best Actress six times for her performances in the films Guerrilla (2011), Chorabali (2012), Zero Degree (2015), Debi (2018), Alatchakra (2021), and The Beauty Circus (2022). She also earned four Filmfare Awards East, Zee Cine Awards, and Meril-Prothom Alo Awards.

== Early life ==
Ahsan was born to A. S. Maswood (d. 2012) and Rehana Maswood in Bangladesh. She has a younger sister and brother. Along with her formal education, she took a diploma course in Rabindra Sangeet and training in classical music. She first appeared on television when she performed in the teledrama Panchami. She modeled for a calendar which caught the eye of Afzal Hossain, who later offered her work on a promotional advertisement for the soft drink Coca-Cola. Afterwards, she left modeling and continued with her studies. She joined the newspaper Bhorer Kagoj, a national daily. After a brief stint at a children's school, she returned to modelling. Thereafter, she worked in Giasuddin Selim's Shongshoy. She also practices crafting and painting, which she demonstrated in art house productions like Enechhi Shurjer Hashi.

== Career ==
=== Television ===
Ahsan first appeared on television in an ad for Coca-Cola in 1997. She debuted her acting career on television through the drama Panchomi, written by Shahidul Haque Khan.

Having begun her career as a model in the late 1990s, Ahsan has since worked in numerous television dramas and serials. She established her reputation as an actress with roles as Monika in Labonyo Probha, Pushpo in Toukir Ahmed and Bipasha Hayat's teleplay Shonkhobash, and in Hatkura. She found Hatkura, set on the edge of a village in Rangpur District, a challenge. "I had to learn the dialect of Rangpur for the role. Actually, I had never been to a village before that. And it was a completely new experience for me", she said. In Channel i's 2010–2011 serial Choita Pagol, she played the role of rural woman Alta. Ahsan said, "Alta is one of my favourite characters. I liked playing the role." Her performance in Mejbaur Rahman Sumon's Tarporo Angurlata Nondoke Bhalobashe also cemented her position as an actress. She portrayed various characters in teledramas including: Sixty Nine (69), Tevaga, Shahortolir Alo, Tarpor Paruler Deen, Amader Choto Nodi, Mayesha, Jostna, Nodi Othoba Roshider Kichu Kolpo Drisyo, Amader Golpo and many more.

Ahsan played the role of a sex worker in the television play Tarporo Angurlata Nando Ke Bhalobashey in 2009.

=== Film ===
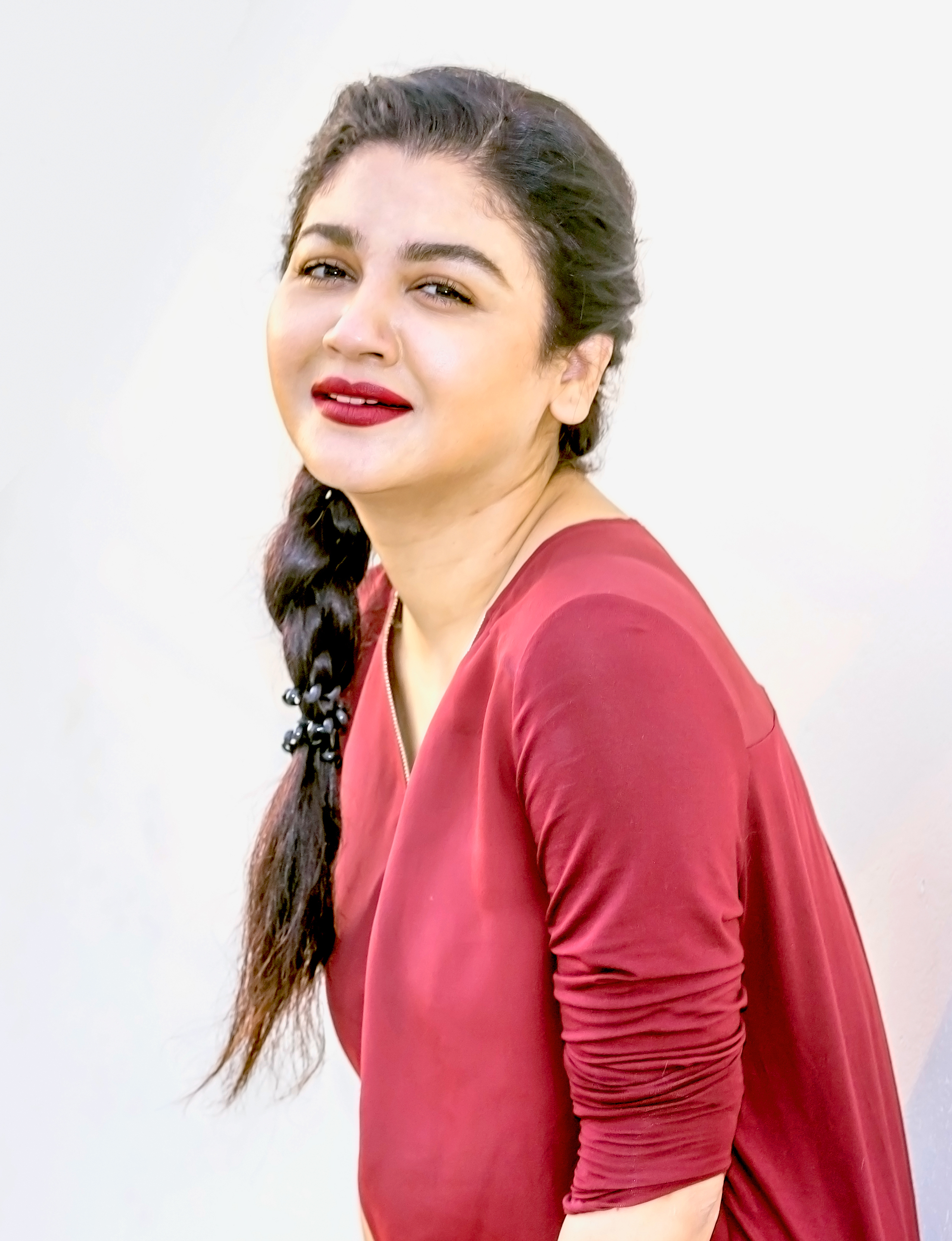
Ahsan in 2017

Ahsan debuted her film career as a guest artiste in the film Bachelor (2004), directed by Mostofa Sarwar Farooki. As the lead actress, she debuted in Nasiruddin Yousuff's film Guerrilla (2011). Adapted from the novel Nishiddho Loban by Syed Shamsul Huq, the film was based on the events of the Bangladesh Liberation War. It narrates the tale of Bilkis Banu, played by Ahsan, a freedom fighter, who actively participates in the Liberation War while searching for her lost husband. The film won National Film Awards in ten categories, including the Best Actress Award for Ahsan.

Ahsan's second film, Chorabali (2012), was an action thriller directed by Redoan Rony. She portrayed Noboni Afroz, a journalist, and won her second National Film Award for Best Actress Award.

In 2013, Ahsan acted in an Indian Bangla film titled Aborto, directed by Arindam Sil. She was nominated for the Filmfare Awards East for Best Debut Performance Female for her role in the film. She also received an official invitation to attend the 66th Cannes Film Festival. In the same year, she appeared in Purno Doirgho Prem Kahini, a Bangladeshi romantic film directed by Shafi Uddin Shafi. It was her first Bangladeshi film in collaboration with Shakib Khan. They both starred in its sequel, Purno Doirgho Prem Kahini 2, released in 2015.

After a one-year break Zero Degree was her next venture. The film is a psychological thriller written and directed by Animesh Aich and was released on 15 January 2015. Ahsan won a National Film Award for best actress for her performance in the film. In 2015, Ahsan worked in two other Indian Bangla films — Rajkahini based on the 1947 east and west Bengal separation directed by Srijit Mukherji and Ekti Bangali Bhuter Goppo, a psycho-horror film directed by Indranil Roychowdhury. Ekti Bangali Bhuter Golpo was set for a world TV premier in Kolkata on 17 May in Zee Bangla Cinema. Jaya's much anticipated Rajkahini starring alongside Rituparna Sengupta, Abir Chatterjee, Parno Mittra, Sohini Sarkar, Rajatava Dutta and many others was released on 16 October 2015.

In 2017, Ahsan acted in Bishorjan alongside Abir Chatterjee and Kaushik Ganguly directed by Kaushik Ganguly himself, for which she received awards including Filmfare Awards (first Bangladeshi to win so), Zee Cine Awards and BFJA Awards for her performance portraying the character of Padma. In the same year, Jaya was honoured with the ABP Ananda Sera Bangali for achievement in acting. Her other two releases that year are Akram Khan's Khacha: The Cage and Manoj Michigan's Ami Joy Chatterjee.

In 2018, Ahsan performed in a courtroom drama Ek Je Chhilo Raja based on the historic Bhawal case directed by Srijit Mukjerji in a star cast including Jisshu Sengupta, Aparna Sen, Anjan Dutt, Rudranil Ghosh and others. She was also seen in Crisscross alongside Mimi Chakraborty and Nusrat Jahan, directed by Birsa Dasgupta. Debi, a film based on Humayun Ahmed's novel, was released on 19 October 2018. It is directed by Anam Biswas, starring Chanchal Chowdhury, Ahsan and Sabnam Faria in the lead roles. The film was produced by Ahsan, as her first production from her production house C Te Cinema. She received her fourth National Film Award for Best Actress and her seventh Meril Prothom Alo Award for Best Film Actress (Critics Choice) for her performance in this film.

In 2019, her first release was Kaushik Ganguly's Bijoya, sequel to Bishorjan for which she won the Tele Cine Awards for Best Actress and Best Jodi alongside her co-star Abir Chatterjee. Then she was seen in Arnab Paul's debut Brishty Tomakey Dilam, a psychological thriller based on split personality disorder. She received the 'Dashobhuja Bangali 2019' award from the St. Xavier's College Calcutta Alumni Association. Next she did Konttho which released on 10 May directed by Nandita Roy and Shiboprosad Mukherjee starring Shiboprosad Mukherjee himself, Paoli Dam where Jaya plays the role of a speech therapist. After that she teamed up with Atanu Ghosh for his movie Bini Sutoy alongside Ritwick Chakraborty. Jaya again worked with Atanu Ghosh next film titled Robibar starring with Prosenjit Chatterjee for the first time. She has finished Soukarya Ghosal's fantasy horror Bhootpori and is shooting for Kaushik Ganguly's next titled Ardhangini starring alongside Churni Ganguly. She wrapped up filming Alatchakra, the first 3D Bengali movie directed by Habibur Rahman based on the novel by Ahmed Sofa. She then worked with Piplu Khan on his first feature film Jaya Aar Sharmin based on the current pandemic.

In December 2023, Ahsan made her Bollywood debut in Kadak Singh, a thriller film by Aniruddha Roy Chowdhury released on Zee5. Hindustan Times regarded her performance in the film as "Outstanding on OTT: Breakout Performance".

In 2025, Jaya Ahsan starred in two Eid-ul-Adha releases—Raihan Rafi's action-thriller Taandob and Tanim Noor's Utshob.

== Playback ==
Ahsan is also a singer and took diploma courses in Indian classical music and Rabindra Sangeet. She did playback in few films, such as "Tomer Khola Hawa" in Dubshatar and "Jongoler Daak" in Mesidona.

== Other activities ==
Ahsan is a craftswoman and a visual-artist, which she demonstrated in art-house movie productions like Enechhi Shurjer Hashi. She was chosen as a brand ambassador for USAID (US Agency for International Development) to help women and children. In 2019, Ahsan was chosen as the brand ambassador of Bangamata U-19 Women's International Gold Cup.

== Personal life ==
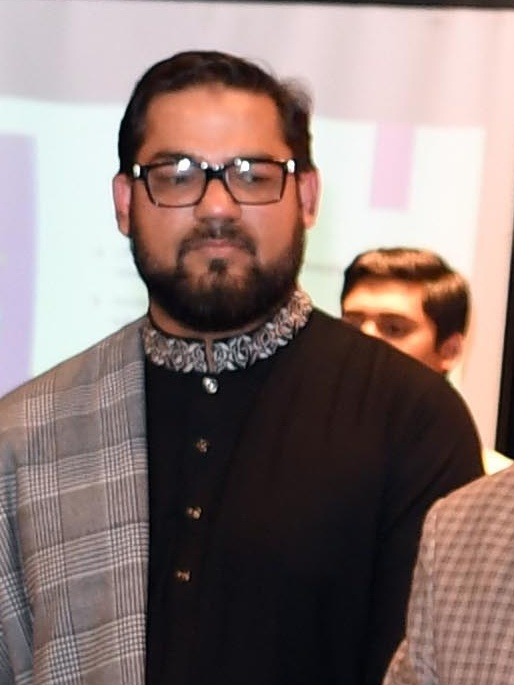
Faisal Ahsan Ullah, Joya's former husband, from whom she adopted her surname.

Ahsan married television model Faisal Ahsan Ullah on 14 May 1998. They appeared together in television commercials and jointly ran an event-management company. The couple divorced in 2012. Joya still uses her ex-husband’s surname, "Ahsan," despite the separation.

Media reports speculated a romantic relationship between Ahsan and director Srijit Mukherji during the filming of Bishorjan (2017). The duo was reported to be dating before Mukherji married actress Rafiath Rashid Mithila in 2019.

== Filmography ==
=== Films ===
Key
†	Denotes films that have not yet been released

Year	Title	Role	Notes	Ref.
2004	Bachelor	Shaila	Special appearance	
2010	Dubshatar	Renuka Rahman	Debut as lead role	
2011	Phirey Esho Behula	Tanima		
2011	Guerrilla	Bilkis Banu		
2012	Chorabali	Noboni Afroz		
2013	Aborto	Charu Sen	Debut Indian Bengali film	
2013	Purno Doirgho Prem Kahini	Zara		
2015	Zero Degree	Saniya		
2015	Ekti Bangali Bhooter Goppo	Amrita Datta	Indian Bengali film	
2015	Rajkahini	Rubina	Indian Bengali film	
2016	Purno Doirgho Prem Kahini 2	Mitu		
2016	Eagoler Chokh	Shibangi	Indian Bengali film	
2016	Bhalobashar Shohor	Annapurna Das	Indian Bengali Short film	
2017	Bishorjan	Padma	Indian Bengali film	
2017	Khacha	Sarojini		
2017	Aami Joy Chatterjee	Dr Aditi Roy	Indian Bengali film	
2018	Putro			
2018	Debi	Ranu	Debut as a producer	
2018	Ek Je Chhilo Raja	Mrinmayee Devi	Indian Bengali film	
2018	Crisscross	Miss Sen	Indian Bengali film	
2019	Bijoya	Padma	Indian Bengali film	
2019	Brishti Tomake Dilam	Brishti	Indian Bengali film	
2019	Konttho	Romilla	Indian Bengali film	
2019	Robibaar	Sayani	Indian Bengali film	
2021	Alatchakra: Circle of Desire	Tayeba		
2021	Binisutoy	Srabani Barua	Indian Bengali film	
2022	The Beauty Circus	Beauty		
2022	Jhora Palok	Labonya Probha Das	Indian Bengali film	
2023	Ardhangini	Meghna	Indian Bengali film	
2023	Dawshom Awbotaar	Moitreyee Ghatak	Indian Bengali film	
2023	Kadak Singh	Naina	Debut Hindi Film	
2024	Peyarar Subash	Peyara		
2024	Bhootpori	Bonolota	Indian Bengali film	
2024	Nakshi Kanthar Jamin	Rehana		
2025	Jaya Aar Sharmin	Jaya	Also as producer	
2025	Taandob	Saira Ali		
2025	Utshob	Jaya Ahsan		
2025	Dear Maa	Brinda Mitra	Indian Bengali film	
2025	Putulnacher Itikatha	Kusum	Indian Bengali film	
2025	Fereshteh	Fereshta	Iran-Bangladesh joint production; also as co-producer	
2026	OCD	Shweta	Indian Bengali film	
2026	Aajo Ardhangini	Meghna Mustafi	Indian Bengali film	
TBA	Mesidona †	TBA	Filming	
TBA	Kalantar †	TBA	Filming; Indian Bengali film	

=== Web series ===
- Paanch Phoron
- Jimmi (2025)

== Television ==
=== Series ===
- Amader Choto Nodi
- Choita Pagol
- Coffee House
- Dorjar Opashe
- Enechhi Shurjer Hashi (2004)
- Labbonno Probha
- Mone Mone
- Manush Badal
- Neer
- Polayon Porbo
- Sixty Nine (69)
- Shonkhobash
- Shomporker Golpo
- Shongshoy
- Tebhaga

=== Telefilms ===
- Amader Golpo
- Americana
- Ami Tomake Bhalobashi
- Aunuposthit Chinho
- Anonto Adhora
- Bikol Pakhir Gaan
- Bhalobashi Tai, Bhalobeshe Jai
- Bumerang
- Cheri-Phuler Name Nam
- Chondrabotir Lottery
- Chor O Novelist
- Daliya
- Denjru
- De Dour
- Ebong Autopor
- Ebong Bonolota Sen
- Ferar Poth Nei, Chilo Na Kono Kale
- Fifth Anniversary
- Gorambhath Athoba Nichok Bhooter Golpo
- Ghum Ghar
- Grohonkal
- Ghum
- Halloween
- Horton-er Bibi
- Hutkura
- Jononir Kanna
- Jostna, Nodi Othoba Roshider Kichu Kolpo Drisyo
- Jaal
- Journey By Boat
- Jontro-Na
- Koyekti Neel Rongpencil
- Kingkortobbo
- Kuashar Bhitor Mrittur Shomoy
- Kuhok
- Maya Athoba Mrittur Galpo
- Madhobi Upakkhan
- Mayesha
- No Mans Land
- Na Komola Na Meherjaan
- Nirjon Shakkhor
- Neel Botam
- Nokkhotro Ghas Chondro Mollikar Raat
- Off Beat
- Obak Sondesh
- Oshomapto Ghor
- Panjabiwala
- Poth Geche Beke
- P.O.Box
- Projapoti
- Raajkonna
- Shohor Tolir Alo
- Shomporker Dana
- Sambala
- Tarpor Paruler Din
- Tarporo Angurlata Nandoke Valobase
- Traceless
- Topur Cycle
- The Facebook

== Awards and nominations ==
National Film Awards

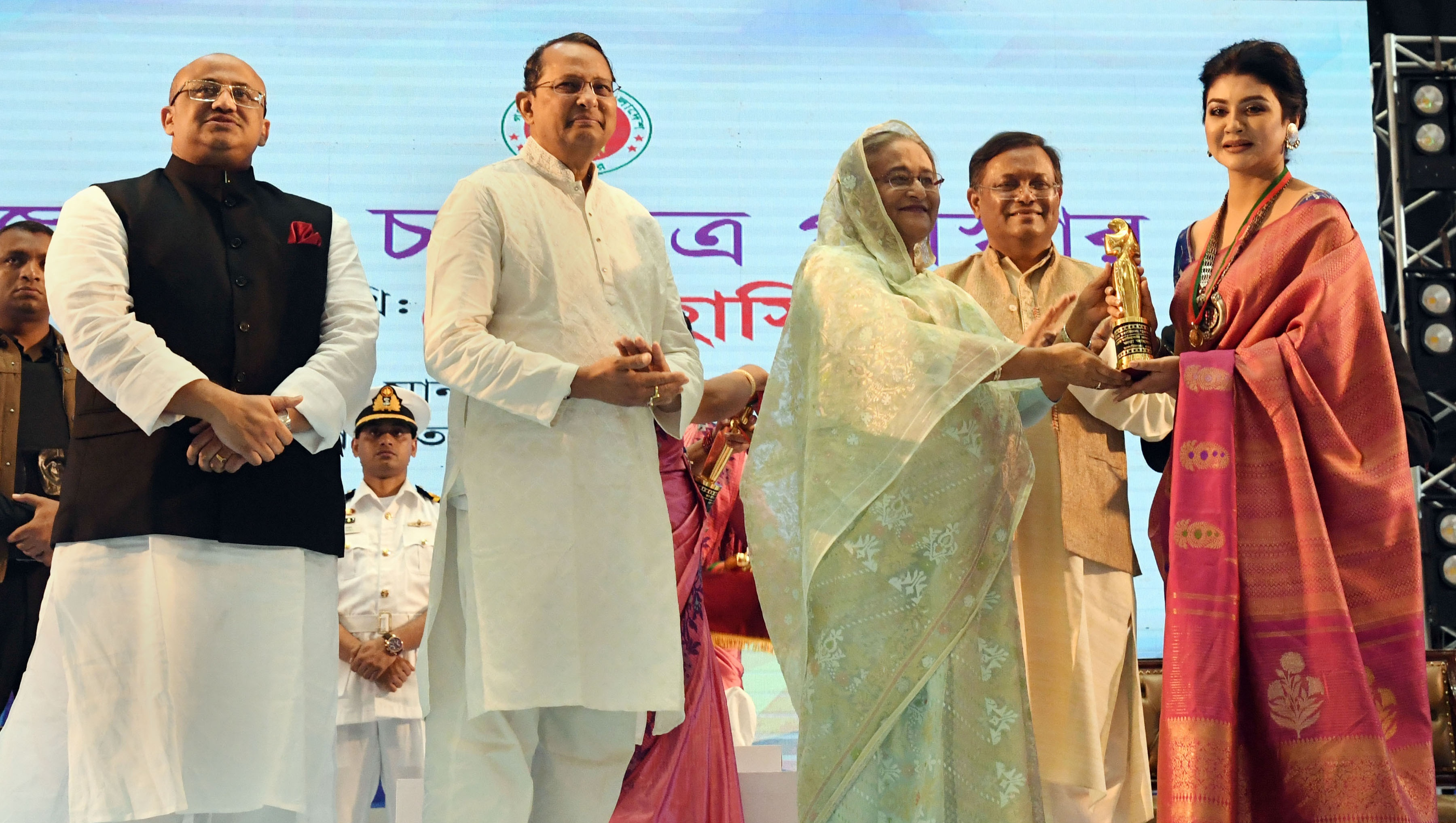
Ahsan receives National Film Awards in 2019 from then prime minister Sheikh Hasina

Year	Category	Film	Result
2011	Best Actress	Guerrilla	Won
2012	Best Actress	Chorabali	Won
2015	Best Actress	Zero Degree	Won
2018	Best Actress	Debi	Won
2022	Best Actress	Beauty Circus	Won

Meril Prothom Alo Awards

Year	Category	Film	Result
2005	Best TV Actress (Public Choice)	Enechi Shurjer Hashi	Nominated
2006	Best TV Actress (Critics Choice)	Hutkura	Won
2007	Best TV Actress (Public Choice)	Shonkhobash	Nominated
2007	Best TV Actress (Critics Choice)	Scriptwritter	Nominated
2009	Best TV Actress (Public Choice)	Tarporo Angurlota Nondoke Bhalobashe	Won
2009	Best TV Actress (Critics Choice)	Bikol Pakhir Gaan	Nominated
2010	Best TV Actress (Public Choice)	Choita Pago	Nominated
2011	Best Film Actress (Critics Choice)	Guerrilla	Won
2011	Best Film Actress (Public Choice)	Guerrilla	Nominated
2011	Best TV Actress (Public Choice)	Choita Pagol	Won
2011	Best TV Actress (Critics Choice)	Koyekti Neel Ronger Pencil	Nominated
2012	Best Film Actress (Public Choice)	Chorabali	Won
2012	Best TV Actress (Public Choice)	Aamader Golpo	Nominated
2012	Best TV Actress (Critics Choice)	Aamader Golpo	Nominated
2013	Best Film Actress (Public Choice)	Purno Doirgho Prem Kahini	Won
2015	Best Film Actress (Critics Choice)	Zero Degree	Nominated
2018	Best Film Actress (Public Choice)	Debi	Nominated
2018	Best Film Actress (Critics Choice)	Debi	Won
2025	Best Actress in Web Series	Jimmi	Won

Bachsas Awards

Year	Category	Film	Result
2011	Best Actress	Guerrilla	Won
2018	Best Actress	Debi	Won

Filmfare Awards Bangla

Year	Category	Film	Result
2013	Best Debutante Female	Aborto	Nominated
2017	Best Actor In A Leading Role (Female)	Eagoler Chokh	Nominated
2018	Best Actor in a Leading Role (Female)	Bishorjan	Won
2018	Critics' Award for Best Actor (Female)	Bishorjan	Nominated
2021	Critics' Award for Best Actor (Female)	Robibaar and Bijoya	Won
2022	Best Actress and Best Actress (Critic)	Binisutoy	Won
2024	Best Supporting Actress	Ardhangini	Won
2025	Best Actor in a Leading Role (Female)	Bhootpori	Nominated

Bengal Film Journalists' Association Awards

Year	Category	Film	Result
2018	Best Actress	Bishorjan	Won
2019	Best Supporting Actress	Ek Je Chhilo Raja	Nominated

Zee Cine Awards

Year	Category	Film	Result
2018	Best Actress (Bengali Films)	Bishorjan	Won

Tele Cine Awards

Year	Category	Film	Result
2015	Best Supporting Role Female	Rajkahini	Won
2019	Best Actress	Bijoya	Won
2019	Best Jodi	Bijoya	Won

International Bangla Film Critic Award

Year	Category	Film	Result
2011	Best Actress	Guerrilla	Won
2017	Best Actress	Bishorjan	Won

ABP Ananda Sera Bangali Award

Year	Category	Result
2017	Achievement in Acting	Won

Dhaka International Film Festival

Year	Category	Film	Result
2011	Best Actress	Guerrilla	Won

Lux Channel i Performance Award

Year	Category	Film	Result
2011	Best Actress (film)	Guerrilla	Won
2011	Best Actress (TV)	Choita Pagol	Won

CJFB Performance Award

Year	Category	Film	Result
2008	Best Actress (TV)	Antorikkho	Won
2009	Best Actress (TV)	Panjabiwala	Won

Charuniram Award

Year	Category	Film	Result
2008	Best Actress (TV)	Antorikkho	Won
2009	Best Actress (TV)	Panjabiwala	Won
2010	Best Actress (TV)	Mayesha	Won

Zee 24 Ghanta Binodoner Sera 24

Year	Category	Film	Result
2026	Best Actress Critics	Putul Nacher Itikotha	Won
