= Anan Zaman =

Bangladeshi playwright and theatre artist

- আনন জামান
- Born: 12 October 1978 (age 47); Golaidanga village, Singair Upazila, Manikganj District, Bangladesh
- Education: Jahangirnagar University,
- Spouse: Shakila Tasmin
- Awards: Bachsas Awards (2013)

Anan Zaman (born 12 October 1978) is a Bangladeshi playwright and theatre artist. His plays include Shikhandi Kotha, Secret of History, and Shrabon Tragedy.

== Early life and education ==
Zaman was born on 12 October 1978 in Golaidanga Village, Singair Upazila, Manikganj District. His father was a teacher. His mother, Taslima Jalal, is a homemaker. In class 8, Zaman formed a theatre platform for youth named Kishore Snejuti Natyagoshthi. He performed his own composition Rudrolila in the form of Jatra Pala. Under the banner of this group, he staged three plays in the form of Jatra Natok which are Shwarther Khela, Samajer Artanad, and Boshonter Nil Nokkhotro. Zaman studied at the Department of Government and Politics, and laster the Department of Drama and Drama Theory at Jahangirnagar University in 1995–1997, studying playwrighting with Selim Al Deen.

== Career ==
Zanan formed a theatre group named Hakim Ali Gayen Theatre in 1996. In 1998 he formed Bunon Theatre in Savar. In 2001, he joined a theatre group, Mahakal Natya somproday as the playwright. He formed Nirabharan Theatre in Singair in 2008.

In 2006, he joined Jahangirnagar University as a teacher in the drama department. While directing plays, he has received the companionship and direct supervision of Acharya Selim Al Deen, Nasir Uddin Yusuf, Azad Abul Kalam and Yusuf Hasan Arko.

He introduced the yearly theatre festival Natgeet GeetNatter Mela from Hakim Ali Gayen Theatre and set up an open platform for theatre performance from the same theatre. He has introduced a fair named Janmo Snajher Sajkaj from Nirabharan Theatre.

He wrote the play Secret of History, about the political situation after the assassination of Bangabandhu Sheikh Mujibur Rahman. In 2002, Mahakal Natya Sampradaya produced his play Shikhandikatha under the direction of Dr. Rashid Harun, a professor at Jahangirnagar University. The play is about the inhuman condition of the transgender community in Bangladesh. In 2015, Dhaka Theatre staged Zaman's play Raikathakata, directed by Ehsanur Rahman. In 2017, his play Shrabon Tragedy was directed by Ashiq Rahman, based on the life of Bangabandhu.

== Film and television ==
Zaman's first film, Biyer Lagna, directed by FI Manik was released in India and Bangladesh in 2006. His television dramas include Ratri Rother Ultopith, Ratrir Khamokha Kheyal, Ashalota O Mando Batasher Galpo, Food station Nineteen Attack, Abbas Mia O Shada Parir Galpo, and Simantahin Pakhi.
