= Padma Kant Shukla =

Indian physicist

- Born: 7 July 1950; Tulapur, U. P., India
- Died: New Delhi, India
- Education: Banaras Hindu University (PhD); Umeå University (PhD)
- Awards: Nicholson Medal for Human Outreach (2005); Gay-Lussac-Humboldt-Prize (2005); Khwarizmi International Award (2009)
- Scientific career
- Fields: Plasma Physics
- Workplaces: Ruhr University Bochum; University of California, San Diego

Padma Kant Shukla (7 July 1950 – 26 January 2013) was a distinguished Professor and first International Chair of the Physics and Astronomy Department of Ruhr-University Bochum in Germany. He was also the director of the International Centre for Advanced Studies in Physical Sciences at Ruhr-University Bochum. He held a PhD in physics from Banaras Hindu University in Varanasi, India and a second doctorate in Theoretical Plasma Physics from Umeå University in Sweden.

== Early life and education ==
Padma Kant Shukla was born in the village Tulapur (near Chunar district Mirzapur) near Varanasi, Uttar Pradesh, India and was educated there. After his PhD in physics from Banaras Hindu University in Varanasi, India at the age of 22, he moved to Umeå University, Sweden in January 1972, and obtained his second doctorate degree in Theoretical Plasma Physics there in 1975. He has lived in Bochum and worked at Ruhr University Bochum, Germany starting January 1973, becoming a German Citizen in 1993. During his marriage life with wife Ranjana Shukla he had three sons.

Shukla has received honorary doctorates from the Prasidium of the Russian Academy of Sciences (Moscow) and the Technical University of Lisbon, Portugal. He is a fellow of the American Physical Society, a fellow of the Institute of Physics (UK), and a corresponding fellow of the Royal Society of Edinburgh (Scotland, UK), a foreign member of the Physics Class of the Royal Swedish Academy of Sciences, the Royal Swedish Academy of Engineering Sciences, and an associate fellow/member of the World Academy for the Advancement of Sciences in the Developing World (Trieste, Italy). He has been awarded the 2005 American Physical Society Dweight Nicholson Medal for the Human Outreach through Physics, a 2011 APS Outstanding Referee, and is recipient of the 2006 Gay-Lussac-Humboldt-Prize from the French Ministry of Education and Research. He is the first laureate of the 22nd Khwarizmi International Award from the IROST, Iran.

== Career ==
Shukla has been a faculty member in the Physics and Astronomy Department at Ruhr-University Bochum, Germany starting January 1973, where he was a Physics Professor and held an International Chair and Directorship of the International Centre for Advanced Studies in Physical Sciences at Ruhr-University Bochum.

Shukla held an adjunct professorship of engineering sciences at the Department of Mechanical and Aerospace Engineering, University of California, San Diego, La Jolla, California, US; an adjunct physics professorship at the Department of Physics & Astronomy, Delhi University, India; visiting professorships at the Department of Physics, Umeå University, Sweden; and at the Scottish Universities Physics Alliance (SUPA) Department of Physics, University of Strathclyde, Glasgow, Scotland (UK). He holds an invited full professorship at GoLP/Centre for Plasma Physics and Nuclear Fusion, Instituto Superior Technico, Technical University of Lisbon, Portugal; an honorary professorship at the School of Chemistry and Physics, University of KwaZulu-Natal, Durban, South Africa..

He was a theoretical plasma physicist with research interests in multidisciplinary sciences including basic and nonlinear physics, nonlinear geophysical flows, atmospheric physics and environmental sciences, soft-condensed matter physics and matter wave solitons, high-energy density physics, nonlinear phenomena in quantum systems, plasma astrophysics and neutrino-plasma physics, plasma-based high-energy charged particle acceleration, intense photon-photon and photon-plasma interactions, and fusion physics. He has published extensively (70 review papers and 1450 papers in more than sixty journals, including Nature, Nature Physics, Reviews of Modern Physics, Physical Review Letters, Physical Review, Physics of Plasmas, Physics Letters A, receiving over 21,200 citations, with the Hirsch Index=62) on various aspects of theoretical and computational plasma physics, as well as numerous novel phenomena involving wave-wave and wave-particle interactions in the physical sciences.

He has coauthored the textbook, Introduction to Dusty Plasma Physics, and edited or co-edited 15 books and several (18) Special Issues of various journals. He was the discoverer of the dust acoustic wave in dusty plasmas and novel attractive force between ions at atomic dimensions in quantum plasmas. He has more than 30 years of experience in committee work both at national and international levels.

Since 1989, Shukla has been a co-organizer/director of the plasma physics activities (Summer Colleges and Workshops in Plasma Physics) at the Abdus Salam International Centre for Theoretical Physics (AS-ICTP), Trieste (Italy), Chairman of the International Advisory Committee of the International Conference on Physics of Dusty Plasmas (ICPDP), and International Advisory Committee member of the International Congress on Plasma Physics (ICPP). He has presented over 130 keynote, plenary, tutorial, and topical lectures in international conferences, including European Physical Society, American Physical Society, ICPP, ICPDP, Summer Colleges and Workshops at the AS-ICTP.

Shukla has contributed to education, and basic and applied physics in developing countries across the globe. He has served (2008-2011) as Chairman of the International Union of Pure and Applied Physics (IUPAP) C.16 Commission on Plasma Physics, and (starting 2008) as Chairman of the Scientific Council of the Emerging Nations Science Foundation (Trieste, Italy), as Editor-in-Chief of J. Plasma Physics (Cambridge University Press, UK), as editorial board member of Physical Review E (American Physical Society), as associate editor of Physics of Plasmas (American Institute of Physics), and was a member of the International Advisory Panel of Plasma Physics and Controlled Fusion (Institute of Physics, Bristol, UK).

== Selected publications ==
- P. K. Shukla and B. Eliasson, "Novel attractive force between ions in quantum plasmas", "Phys. Rev. Lett." '"108"', 165007 (2012) (5 pages); Erratum: PRL 108, 219902(E) (2012); PRL 109, 019901 (E) (2012) (1 page).
- I. Zeba, M. E. Yahia, P. K. Shukla, W. M. Moslem, Electron–hole two-stream instability in quantum semiconductor plasma with exchange-correlation effects; Physics Letters A 376 (2012) 2309–2313.
- P. K. Shukla and B. Eliasson. "Nonlinear collective interactions in quantum plasmas with degenerate electron fluids", "Rev. Mod. Phys." 83, 885-906 (2011). SCI=58 (Source Google Scholar).
- P. K. Shukla and K. Avinash. "Phase coexistence and a critical point in ultracold-neutral plasmas", "Phys. Rev. Lett." 107, 135002 (2011) [5 pages].
- P. K. Shukla and B. Eliasson. "Nonlinear aspects of quantum plasma physics", "Uspekhi Fizicheskikh Nauk" 180, 55–82 (2010) [Eng. Translation]: Phys. Usp 53, 51–76 (2010). SCI=159 (Source Google Scholar).
- P. K. Shukla and B. Eliasson. "Fundamentals of dust-plasma interactions", Rev. Mod. Phys. 81, 25–44 (2009). SCI=213 (Source Google Scholar).
- P. K. Shukla. "A new spin in quantum plasmas", Nature Phys. 5, 92–93 (2009). SCI=58 (Source Google SCholar).
- D. Shaikh and P. K. Shukla. "Fluid turbulence in quantum plasmas", Phys. Rev. Lett. 99, 125002 (2007) [4 pages]. SCI=72 (Google Scholar).
- P. K. Shukla and B. Eliasson. "Formation and dynamics of dark solitons and vortices in quantum electron plasmas", Phys. Rev. Lett. 96, 245001 (4pp) (2006). SCI=156 (Source Google Scholar).
- P. K. Shukla, I. Kourakis, B. Eliasson, M. Marklund and L. Stenflo. "Instability and evolution of nonlinearly interacting water waves", Phys. Rev. Lett. 96, 094501 (2006) [4 pages]. SCI=64 (Source Google Scholar).
- B. Eliasson and P. K. Shukla. "Formation and dynamics of coherent structures involving phase-space vortices in plasmas", Phys. Rep. 422, 225–290 (2006). SCI=60 (Source Google Scholar).
- M. Marklund and P. K. Shukla. "Nonlinear collective effects in photon-photon and photon-plasma interactions", Rev. Mod. Phys. 78, 591–640 (2006). SCI=407 (Source Google Scholar).
- D. Sundkvist, V. Krasnoselskikh, P. K. Shukla, A. Vaivdas, M. Andre, S. Buchert and H. Reme. "In situ multi-satellite detection of coherent vortices as a manifestation of Alfvenic turbulence", Nature (London) 436, 825–828 (2005).SCI= 72 (Source Google Scholar).
- D. Jovanovic and P. K. Shukla. "Magnetic reconnection mediated by lower-hybrid, phase-space vortices", Phys. Rev. Lett. 93, 015002 (2004) [4 pages].
- P. K. Shukla. "Nonlinear waves and structures in dusty plasmas", "Phys. Plasmas" 10, 1619-1627 (2003). SCI=72.
- P. K. Shukla and A. A. Mamun. "Solitons, shocks, and vortices in dusty plasmas", "New J. Phys." 5, 17.1--17.37 (2003). SCI=172 (Source Google Scholar).
- P. K. Shukla and A. A. Mamun. "Introduction to Dusty Plasma Physics", IoP, Bristol, UK (2002). SCI=1250 (Source Google Scholar).
- P. K. Shukla. "A survey of dusty plasma physics", Phys. Plasmas 8, 1791–1803 (2001). SCI=286 (Source Google Scholar).
- P. K. Shukla. "Parametric instability of dust lattice waves in a turbulent plasma sheath", Phys. Rev. Lett. 84, 5328–5330 (2000). SCI=32.
- D. Jovanovic and P. K. Shukla. "Nonlinear model for coherent electric-field structures in the magnetosphere", Phys. Rev. Lett. 84, 4373–4376 (2000). SCI=32.
- Y. Nakamura, H. Bailung and P. K. Shukla. "Observation of ion-acoustic shocks in a dusty plasma", Phys. Rev. Lett. 83, 1602–1605 (1999). SCI=312 (Source Google Scholar).
- P. K. Shukla, R. Bingham, H. A. Bethe, J. M. Dawson, and J. S. Su. "Nonlinear scattering of neutrinos by plasma waves: a ponderomotive force description", Phys. Lett. A 260, 107–110 (1996). SCI=71 (Source Google Scholar).
- A. A. Mamun, R. A. Cairns and P. K. Shukla. "Solitary potentials in dusty plasmas", Phys. Plasmas 3, 702–706 (1996). SCI=148 (Source Google Scholar).
- P. K. Shukla and N. N. Rao. "Coulomb crystallization in colloidal plasmas with streaming ions and dust grains", Phys. Plasmas 3, 1770–1772 (1996). SCI=80.
- A. A. Mamun, R. A. Cairns and P. K. Shukla. "Effects of vortex-like and nonthermal ion distributions on nonlinear dust acoustic waves", Phys. Plasmas 3, 2610–2614 (1996). SCI=223.
- S. I. Popel, S. V. Vladimirov and P. K. Shukla. "Ion-acoustic solitons in an electron-positron-ion plasma", Phys. Plasmas 2, 716–720 (1995). SCI=205.
- P. K. Shukla, G. Birk and Bingham. "Vortex streets driven by sheared flow and applications to black aurora", Geophys. Res. Lett. 22, 671–674, (1995). SCI=71.
- R. A. Cairns, A. A. Mamun, R. Bingham, R. Bostrom, R. O. Dendy, C. M. C. Nairns and P. K. Shukla. "Electrostatic solitary structures in nonthermal plasmas", Geophys. Res. Lett. 22, 2709–2712 (1995). SCI=229.
- M. Nambu, and S. V. Vladimirov and P. K. Shukla. "Attractive forces between charged particulates in plasmas", Phys. Lett. A 203, 40–42 (1995). SCI= 192 (Source Google Scholar).
- P. K. Shukla and R. K. Varma. "Convective cells in nonuniform dusty plasmas", Phys. Fluids B 5, 236–237 (1993). SCI=87.
- R. K. Varma, P. K. Shukla and V. Krishan. "Electrostatic oscillations in the presence of grain charge perturbations in dusty plasmas", Phys. Rev. E 47, 3612–3616 (1993). SCI=306 (Source Google Scholar).
- P. K. Shukla. "Low-frequency modes in dusty plasmas", Physica Scripta 45, 504–507 (1992). SCI=212 (Source Google Scholar).
- P. K. Shukla and V. P. Silin. "Dust ion-acoustic wave", Physica Scripta 45, 508 (1992). SCI=641 (Source Google Scholar).
- P. K. Shukla, M. Y. Yu and R. Bharuthram. "Linear and nonlinear dust drift waves", J. Geophys. Res. 96, 21343–21346 (1991). SCI=129 (Source Google Scholar).
- N. N. Rao, P. K. Shukla and M. Y. Yu. "Dust-acoustic waves in dusty plasmas", Planet. Space Sci. 38, 543–546 (1990). SCI=12978(via Google Scholar).
- P. K. Shukla, N. N. Rao, M. Y. Yu and N. L. Tsintsadze. "Relativistic nonlinear effects in plasmas", Phys. Rep. 138, 1–149 (1986). SCI=327 (Source Google Scholar).
- R. Bharuthram and P. K. Shukla. "Large amplitude ion-acoustic double layers in a double Maxwellian electron plasma", Phys. Fluids 29, 3214–3218 (1986). SCI=70.
- P. K. Shukla and L. Stenflo. "Nonlinear propagation of electromagnetic ion-cyclotron Alfven waves", Phys. Fluids 28, 1576–1578 (1985). SCI=62.
- P. K. Shukla, M. Y. Yu, H. U. Rahman and K. H. Spatschek. "Nonlinear convective motion in plasmas", Phys. Rep. 105, 227–228 (1984). SCI=81 (source Google Scholar).
- G. Murtaza and P. K. Shukla. "Nonlinear generation of electromagnetic waves in a magnetoplasma", J. Plasma Phys. 31, 423–436 (1984). SCI=62.
- P. K. Shukla and L. Stenflo. "Nonlinear propagation of electromagnetic waves in magnetized plasmas", Phys. Rev. A 30, 2110–2112 (1984). SCI=71.
- P. K. Shukla and J. M. Dawson. "Stimulated Compton scattering of hydromagnetic waves in the interstellar medium", Astrophys. J. Lett. 276, L49–L51 (1984). SCI=12.
- R. P. Sharma and P. K. Shukla. "Nonlinear effects at the upper-hybrid layer", Phys. Fluids 26, 87–99 (1983). SCI=63.
- P. K. Shukla, H. U. Rahman and R. P. Sharma. "Alfven soliton in a low-beta plasma", J. Plasma Phys. 28, 125–127 (1982). SCI=64.
- P. K. Shukla. "Modulational instability of whistler-mode signals", Nature (London) 274, 874–875 (1978). SCI=26.
- M. Y. Yu and P. K. Shukla. "Finite amplitude solitary Alfven waves", Phys. Fluids 21, 1457–1458 (1978). SCI=68.
- P. K. Shukla and M. Y. Yu. "Exact solitary ion acoustic waves in a magnetoplasma", J. Math. Phys. 19, 2506–2508 (1978). SCI=104 (source Google Scholar).
