= Bishorjan =

- Directed by: Kaushik Ganguly
- Screenplay by: Kaushik Ganguly
- Story by: Kaushik Ganguly
- Produced by: Opera Movies
- Starring: Abir Chatterjee; Jaya Ahsan; Kaushik Ganguly; Lama Halder
- Cinematography: Souvik Basu
- Edited by: Subhajit Singha
- Music by: Kalika Prasad Bhattacharya
- Release date: April 2017
- Running time: 129 minutes
- Country: India
- Language: Bengali

Bishorjan (transl. Immersion) is a 2017 Indian Bengali-language film written and directed by Kaushik Ganguly, produced by Opera Productions. It stars Abir Chatterjee, and Jaya Ahsan. The story revolves around a love story between a Bangladeshi Hindu widow and Indian Muslim businessman, who one day washes up on the Bangladesh side of the Ichamati river.

The film was officially selected at the 2017 Hyderabad Bengali Film Festival and was released theatrically on 14 April 2017. It was a critical and commercial success. Bishorjan received six Filmfare East Awards, including Best Film, Best Director, Best Story, and Best Actress, as well as Best Feature Film in Bengali at the 64th National Film Awards.

== Plot ==
The film opens as a young Hindu woman refuses to see Durga Bishorjon with her son. Bishorjon is a huge celebration, during which the two Bengals immerse their Durga idols in Ichamati River, which separates them. The young mother recalls memories of a Bishorjon in her past.

After the partition of India, Bengal was divided into East Pakistan (later Bangladesh), and West Bengal, a state in India. Border tensions rise, and the people from either side begin drifting apart. A Hindu widow, Padma, lives in a village on the Bangladeshi side with her aging father-in-law. One day, she saves a West Bengali Muslim man, Nasir, who had nearly drowned in the river during Durga Bishorjon, and cares for him. Nasir's presence in Bangladesh is illegal. To suppress any suspicion of his citizenship, they claim he is her cousin. Ganesh, a middle-aged jamidar man, as well as, an admirer of Padma's, who lives in her village, grows suspicious of Nasir. Padma and Nasir wonder how a river divided people of the same ethnicity and created differences between them.

Padma tries to find a way for Nasir to return to India. He reminds her of her husband, who died from excessive drinking. When Padma hears about Nasirs's girlfriend, Ayesha, she is heartbroken. The two lonely souls fall for each other. Ganesh learns Nasir's identity and decides to keep watch on him. Nasir confesses to Padma that he lied about drowning during Durga Bishorjon, and reveals he has connections to the black market. Padma's father-in-law dies. Nasir worries about Padma's safety as a young widow alone in the village exposed to Ganesh's prying eyes. Padma tells him not to worry and to prepare to return to West Bengal. Ganesh makes a heartfelt confession of love to Padma. He promises to wait for her. Padma arranges Nasir's return to India but needs help. She accepts Ganesh's marriage proposal in exchange for his help in smuggling Nasir back to West Bengal.

The night before Naseer leaves, Padma gets drunk and bares her pain to Nasir. Distraught that Padma has to marry Ganesh because of him, he breaks down. Unable to control their feelings, the two make love. The next day, Padma bids a tearful goodbye to Naseer and sends him away with a gift for Ayesha. Nasir promises to end his business in the black market. Ganesh takes Padma to his house as Nasir leaves. Padma marries Ganesh, and it's Bijoya Doshomi. She refuses to go to see Bishorjon in Ichamati, and her little son leaves with Ganesh without her. At the end of the film it is revealed that her son is Nasir's, as both carry the same birthmark.

== Cast ==
- Jaya Ahsan as Padma
- Abir Chatterjee as Nasir
- Kaushik Ganguly as Ganesh Mandal
- Lama as Lau

== Accolades ==
Award	Category	Recipient(s)	Result
Caleidoscope Indian Film Festival	Best Film Jury	Bishorjan	Won
Caleidoscope Indian Film Festival	Best Actress Jury	Jaya Ahsan	Won
3rd Filmfare Awards East	Best Film	Bishorjan	Won
3rd Filmfare Awards East	Best Film Critics	Kaushik Ganguly	Nominated
3rd Filmfare Awards East	Best Director	Kaushik Ganguly	Won
3rd Filmfare Awards East	Best Story	Kaushik Ganguly	Won
3rd Filmfare Awards East	Best Supporting Actor	Kaushik Ganguly	Won
3rd Filmfare Awards East	Best Screenplay	Kaushik Ganguly	Nominated
3rd Filmfare Awards East	Best Dialogue	Kaushik Ganguly	Nominated
3rd Filmfare Awards East	Best Actress	Jaya Ahsan	Won
3rd Filmfare Awards East	Best Actress Critics	Jaya Ahsan	Nominated
3rd Filmfare Awards East	Best Music Director	Kalika Prasad Bhattacharya	Nominated
3rd Filmfare Awards East	Best Background Score	Indraadip Dasgupta	Nominated
3rd Filmfare Awards East	Best Cinematography	Souvik Basu	Nominated
3rd Filmfare Awards East	Best Production Design	Gautam Basu	Nominated
3rd Filmfare Awards East	Best Sound Design	Anirban Sengupta	Won
Hyderabad Bengali Film Festival	Best Film (Viewers’ Choice)	Bishorjan	Won
Hyderabad Bengali Film Festival	Best Director (Viewers’ Choice)	Kaushik Ganguly	Won
Hyderabad Bengali Film Festival	Best Supporting Actor – Male (Viewers’ Choice)	Kaushik Ganguly	Won
Hyderabad Bengali Film Festival	Best Actor – Female (Viewers’ Choice)	Jaya Ahsan	Won
Hyderabad Bengali Film Festival	Best Actor – Female (Jury)	Jaya Ahsan	Won
International Bangla Film Awards	Best Director Critic Choice	Kaushik Ganguly	Won
International Bangla Film Awards	Best Supporting Actor Critic Choice	Kaushik Ganguly	Won
International Bangla Film Awards	Best Actress Critic Choice	Jaya Ahsan	Won
64th National Film Awards	Best Feature Film in Bengali	Producer: Opera Movies Director: Kaushik Ganguly	Won
West Bengal Film Journalists' Association Awards	Best Film	Producer: Opera Movies Director: Kaushik Ganguly	Nominated
West Bengal Film Journalists' Association Awards	Best Director	Kaushik Ganguly	Won
West Bengal Film Journalists' Association Awards	Best Supporting Actor	Kaushik Ganguly	Won
West Bengal Film Journalists' Association Awards	Best Screenplay	Kaushik Ganguly	Won
West Bengal Film Journalists' Association Awards	Best Actress	Jaya Ahsan	Won
West Bengal Film Journalists' Association Awards	Best Actor In A Comic Role	Lama	Won
West Bengal Film Journalists' Association Awards	Best Music Director	Kalika Prasad Bhattacharya	Won
West Bengal Film Journalists' Association Awards	Best Art Director	Gautam Basu	Won
Zee Cine Bengali Awards	Best Film	Bishorjan	Won
Zee Cine Bengali Awards	Best Actress	Jaya Ahsan	Won

== Sequel ==
Ganguly directed Bijoya, a sequel to Bishorjan, which released on 4 January 2019. Jaya Ahsan and Abir Chatterjee played the lead roles.
