= Robibaar =

Bengali film

- Directed by: Atanu Ghosh
- Written by: Atanu Ghosh
- Screenplay by: Atanu Ghosh
- Story by: Atanu Ghosh
- Produced by: Sandeep Agarwal
- Starring: Prosenjit Chatterjee; Jaya Ahsan
- Cinematography: Appu Prabhakar
- Edited by: Sujoy Datta Ray
- Music by: Debojyoti Mishra
- Release date: 27 December 2019
- Running time: 118 mins
- Country: India
- Language: Bengali

Robibaar (transl. On A Sunday) is a Bengali romance drama film directed by Atanu Ghosh and produced by Sandeep Agarwal. Released on 27 December 2019, it stars Prosenjit Chatterjee and Bangladesh actress Jaya Ahsan. The film was produced under the banner of Echo Entertainment Private Limited.

== Plot ==
Fifteen years after a messy break-up, former lovers Sayani and Asimabha meet again. The wounds haven't healed, and as the day progresses, Sayani, gripped by deep misgivings, tries to leave, again and again. Trust has gone missing between Asimabha and her. The only way the two can now be together is by striking a cut-and-dried, mutually self-serving deal.

== Cast ==
- Prosenjit Chatterjee as Asimabha
- Jaya Ahsan as Sayani
- Shrijato Banerjee as Robi
- Saswati Sinha as Brinda
- Mithun Debnath as Lotkai
