= Bijoya =

2019 Bengali film

- Film poster
- Directed by: Kaushik Ganguly
- Screenplay by: Kaushik Ganguly
- Story by: Kaushik Ganguly
- Starring: Abir Chatterjee; Jaya Ahsan; Kaushik Ganguly; Lama Halder
- Cinematography: Souvik Basu
- Edited by: Subhajit Singha
- Music by: Indraadip Dasgupta; Jalaluddin
- Production company: Opera Movies
- Distributed by: Star Synergy Entertainment
- Release date: 4 January 2019
- Running time: 129 minutes
- Country: India
- Language: Bengali

Bijoya (transl. Victory) is a 2019 Indian Bengali-language film directed by Kaushik Ganguly, produced by Opera Movies and presented by Suparnokanti Karati. It serves as the sequel to Bishorjan (2017) and stars Abir Chatterjee and Jaya Ahsan reprising their roles from the previous film. The movie continues the ending of Bishorjon and explores the story six years later Nasir Ali first met Padma. The film was released on 4 January 2019.

== Plot ==
The movie is six years after Nasir Ali met Padma and returned to India. Bijoya, the film, has a simple story line that takes forward Bishorjon's ending. The movie opens up with Lau very concerned about Ganesh Mandal, and asking questions to the doctor regarding his heart condition. The doctor suggests Padma and Ganesh to go to Kolkata AMRI Hospital for better treatment. After consulting with a doctor at the hospital, she surprisingly meets Nasir who is working there as a pharmacist. The story unfolds as Nasir learns about his son and Ganesh's heart condition.

== Cast ==
- Jaya Ahsan as Padma
- Abir Chatterjee as Nasir Ali
- Kaushik Ganguly as Ganesh Mandal
- Lama Halder as Lau

== Soundtrack ==
Bijoya

Soundtrack album by Indraadip Dasgupta
- Released: 2019
- Recorded: 2018
- Genre: Feature film soundtrack
- Language: Bengali
- Producer: Kaushik Ganguly

The film music & background score composed by Indraadip Dasgupta.

No.	Title	Lyrics	Music	Singer(s)	Length
1.	"Tomar Pasher Desh"	Kaushik Ganguly	Indraadip Dasgupta	Arijit Singh	4:01
2.	"Ekul Bhange Okul Gawre Nazrul Geeti"	Kazi Nazrul Islam	Indraadip Dasgupta	Arko	3:47
3.	"Kalo Megh Akasher Gae"	Jalaluddin	Jalaluddin	Rajib Das (Dohar)	4:44

== Accolades ==
Award	Category	Recipient(s)	Result
Filmfare Awards Bangla	Critics Best Actor In A Leading Role (Female)	Jaya Ahsan Also, for Robibaar	Won
Filmfare Awards Bangla	Best Lyricist	Kaushik Ganguly (Tomar Pasher Desh)	Nominated
Tele Cine Awards	Best Actress	Jaya Ahsan	Won
Tele Cine Awards	Best Jodi	Abir Chatterjee and Jaya Ahsan	Won
