= Padma Gole =

Marathi writer (1913–1998)

- Born: 1913; Tasgaon, Sangli
- Died: 12 February 1998 (aged 84–85)
- Citizenship: Indian
- Occupation: Poet
- Relatives: Vinayakrao Patwardhan, Saraswatibai Patwardhan (parents)
- Writing career
- Pen name: Padma
- Language: Marathi

Padma Gole (1913–1998) was a Marathi poet from Maharashtra, India.

== Early life ==
She was born into a patwardhan family of Tasgaon (District Sangli). Gole was second child of Shrimant Vinayakrao alias Babasaheb Patwardhan and Shrimant Saraswatibai Patwardhan. After Vinayakrao's death in 1923, her mother took all their children to Pune where all siblings took their education. Ms Gole had four siblings Shrimant Kamlini alias Taisaheb Peshawa (1911–1973), Parshuram Vinayakrao Patwardhan (1917–1989), Mangalmurti Vinayakrao alias Bhaiyyasaheb Patwardhan (1920–1980) and Kamalatai Bhave, Jabalpur/Mumbai.

== Career ==
She was one of the many women from rich Indian families who were emboldened by the Gandhian movement to become feminist writers.

Her poetry was heavily influenced by the writings of Ram Ganesh Gadkari, Tryambak Bapuji Thombre, and Yashwant Dinkar Pendharkar. Much of Padma's poetry depicts the domestic lives of Indian middle-class women.

== Poetry collections ==
- Akashwedi (आकाशवेडी)
- Shrawan Megh (श्रावणमेघ)
- Pritipathawar (प्रीतिपथावर)
- Nihar ( निहार)
- Swapnata (स्वप्नता)
- Sakal
