= List of rampage killers (religious, political, or ethnic crimes) =

This is a list of mass or spree killers that were considered by reliable sources to have been motivated by political or religious causes. A mass murderer is typically defined as someone who kills three or more people in one incident, with no "cooling off" period, not including themselves. A mass murder typically occurs in a single location where one or more persons kill several others.

This list does not include serial killers or major figures in politics and government who orchestrated such actions.

== Africa ==
Perpetrator	Date	Year	Location	Country	Killed	Injured	W	Additional notes	Ref.
Mohamed Rashed Daoud Al-Owhali, 21, Jihad Mohammed Ali, 24	7 Aug	1998	Nairobi	Kenya	213	4,500+	F E	Ali committed suicide bombing Al-Owhali sentenced to life without parole	
Abdul Hadi al-Fulani	18 Jan	2017	Gao	Mali	77	120	V E	Committed suicide	
Dhuhulow, Hassan Abdi, 23; Abukar, Ahmed Hassan, 19–23; Said, Mohammed Abdinur, 19–23; Osman, Yahye Ahmed, 14-15	21-24 Sep	2013	Nairobi	Kenya	66	173	F E	All killed by police 1 killed and 2 injured in friendly-fire incident	
Yacoubi, Seifeddine Rezgui, 22 (سيف الدين رزقي اليعقوبي)	26 June	2015	Sousse	Tunisia	38	39	F E	Killed by police	
Two unknown men	24 Aug	2010	Mogadishu	Somalia	30	5+	F E	Both committed suicide	
Mahmoud Shafiq Mohammed Mustafa, 22	11 Dec	2016	Cairo	Egypt	29	47	E	Committed suicide	
Labidi, Yassine, 20; Khachnaoui, Saber, 26	18 March	2015	Tunis	Tunisia	22	42	F	Both killed by police	
Abbas al-Baqir Abbas, 33 (عباس الباقر عباس)	8 Dec	2000	Jarafa	Sudan	22	31	F	Killed by police	
Two unknown men	20 Nov	2015	Bamako	Mali	20	7–9+	F E	Both killed by soldiers	
Niser bin Muhammad Nasr Nawar, 24	11 April	2002	Djerba	Tunisia	19	30+	E	Committed suicide	
Adil El-Atmani, 25	28 Apr	2011	Marrakesh	Morocco	17	25	E	Sentenced to death	
Abdelli, Houssem, 27	24 Nov	2015	Tunis	Tunisia	13	16	E	Committed suicide bombing	
Khumalo, Banda, 38 (Note: Assailant was a member of the military, police, or a comparable force at the time of the rampage.)	4 Dec	1977	Bulawayo	Rhodesia	13	13–16	F	Killed by police	
Hamden Khalif Allah Awad, 27	7 Aug	1998	Dar es Salaam	Tanzania	11	85	E	Committed suicide	
ben Hassan, Adouani Hamouda, 27	18 March	1987	Djibouti City	Djibouti	11	40	E	Sentenced to death	
Khalid Al-Islambuli, 26; Hussein Abbas Mohammed, 21; Atta Tayel Hemeida, 21; Abdel-Hamad Abdel-Salem Abdel-Aal, 31	6 Oct	1981	Cairo	Egypt	11	28	F E	All four were sentenced to death and executed	
Ibrahim Ismail Ismail Mustafa, 33	29 Dec	2017	Cairo	Egypt	10	6	F	Sentenced to death and executed Suspected of other attacks	
Strydom, Barend Hendrik, 23	15 Nov	1988	De Deur & Pretoria	South Africa	8	16	F	Sentenced to death plus 30 years	
Suleiman Mohammed Abdul-Hamid Khater, 24 (سليمان خاطر)	5 Oct	1985	Ras Burqa	Egypt	8	4	F	Sentenced to life imprisonment	
Mohamed, Hamza Hassan, 29	25 Aug	2021	Dar es Salaam	Tanzania	4	9	F	Killed by police	
Nel, Jozef Johannes, 18	14 Jan	2008	Skierlik	South Africa	4	8	F	Sentenced to life imprisonment	

== Americas ==
Perpetrator	Date	Year	Location	Country	Killed	Injured	W	Additional notes	Ref.
McVeigh, Timothy James, 26; Nichols, Terry Lynn, 40	19 April	1995	Oklahoma City, Oklahoma	United States	168–169	680+	E	McVeigh sentenced to death and executed. Nichols sentenced to life imprisonment.	
Berro, Hussein Ibrahim, 21 (ابراهيم حسين برّو)	18 July	1994	Buenos Aires	Argentina	85	300+	E	Committed suicide	
Mateen, Omar Mir Seddique, 29	12 June	2016	Orlando, Florida	United States	49	53	F	Killed by police	
Arellan, John Freddy, 26	7 Feb	2003	Bogotá	Colombia	35	200+	E	Died in the blast	
Muhammad Nur Al-Din Nuer Al-Din, 24	17 March	1992	Buenos Aires	Argentina	29	242	E	Committed suicide bombing	
Crusius, Patrick Wood, 21	3 Aug	2019	El Paso, Texas	United States	23	22	F	Sentenced to life imprisonment	
Rojas Rodríguez, Aldemar José, 57	17 Jan	2019	Bogotá	Colombia	21	68	E	Committed suicide	
Ali Hawa Jamal	19 July	1994	Colón Province	Panama	20	0	E	Committed suicide bombing	
Shamsud-Din Bahar Jabbar, 42	1 Jan	2025	New Orleans	United States	14	57	F V	Killed by police	
Farook, Syed Rizwan, 28; Malik, Tashfeen, 29	2 Dec	2015	San Bernardino, California	United States	14	24	F	Both killed by police	
Hasan, Nidal Malik, 39	5 Nov	2009	Fort Hood, Texas	United States	13	32	F	Sentenced to death	
Bowers, Robert Gregory, 46	27 Oct	2018	Pittsburgh, Pennsylvania	United States	11	6	F	Sentenced to death	
Gendron, Payton Spencer, 18	14 May	2022	Buffalo, New York	United States	10	3	F	Sentenced to life imprisonment	
Essex, Mark James Robert, 23	31 Dec/ 7 Jan	1972–3	New Orleans, Louisiana	United States	9	13	F A	Killed by police	
Roof, Dylann Storm, 21	17 June	2015	Charleston, South Carolina	United States	9	1	F	Sentenced to death	
Taucci Monteiro, Guilherme, 17	13 Mar	2019	Suzano	Brazil	8	11	F	Committed suicide	
Garcia, Mauricio Martinez, 33	6 May	2023	Allen, Texas	United States	8	7	F	Killed by police	
Smith, Roland James, 50–51	8 Dec	1995	New York City, New York	United States	7	4	F A	Committed suicide	
Ratzmann, Terry, 44	12 March	2005	Brookfield, Wisconsin	United States	7	4	F	Committed suicide	
Page, Wade Michael, 40	5 Aug	2012	Oak Creek, Wisconsin	United States	7	3	F	Committed suicide One of the victims died in 2020; attributed to this event	
Watson, Charles Denton, 23; Krenwinkel, Patricia, 21; Van Houten, Leslie, 19; Atkins, Susan, 21	9-10 Aug	1969	Los Angeles, California	United States	7	0	FM	All arrested, sentenced to death and commuted; Atkins died in prison in 2009	
Ramzi Ahmed Yousef, 24; Eyad Ismoil, 21	26 Feb	1993	New York City	United States	6	1042	E	Yousef was sentenced to life in prison; Ismoil was sentenced to 240 years in prison, commuted to 210;; Yousef killed one other person one year later	
Ferguson, Colin, 35	7 Dec	1993	Garden City, New York	United States	6	19	F	Sentenced to 315 years and 8 months to life imprisonment	
Bissonnette, Alexandre, 27	Jan 29	2017	Quebec City, Quebec	Canada	6	19	F	Sentenced to life imprisonment	
Christopher, Joseph Gerard, 25	22 Dec–1/18 Jan	1980/1981	New York, Buffalo, & Rochester, New York Fort Benning, Georgia	United States	6	6	M	Sentenced to 60 years to life in prison Killed 6 and injured 1 other in 1980	
Hastings, Louis D., 39	3 March	1983	McCarthy, Alaska	United States	6	2	F	Sentenced to 634 years in prison	
Franklin, Joseph Paul, 30	8/15/25 June	1980	Cincinnati, Ohio; Johnstown, Pennsylvania; Pocahontas County, West Virginia	United States	6	0	F	Sentenced to death and executed	
McCree, Clifton, 41	9 Feb	1996	Fort Lauderdale, Florida	United States	6	0	F	Committed suicide One of the victims died in 2006; attributed to this event	
Tsarnaev, Tamerlan Anzorovich, 26; Tsarnaev, Dzhokhar Anzorovich, 19	15-19 Apr	2013	Boston, Watertown, & Cambridge, Massachusetts	United States	5	297–500+	FEV	Tamerlan was fatally ran over by his brother; Dzhokhar was convicted and remains on death row One victim died in 2014, attributed to this event Tamerlan is suspected of murdering three other people	
Aldrich, Anderson Lee, 22	19–20 Nov	2022	Colorado Springs	United States	5	19	F	Sentenced to life imprisonment	
Johnson, Micah Xavier, 25	7 July	2016	Dallas, Texas	United States	5	11	F	Killed by police	
Sanford, Thomas Jacob, 40	28 Sep	2025	Grand Blanc Township, Michigan	United States	4	8	F A	Killed by police	
French, Kenneth Junior, 22	6 Aug	1993	Fayetteville	United States	4	7	F	Sentenced to life imprisonment	
Lambright, Donald Martin, 30	5 April	1969	Harrisburg	United States	4	15	F	Committed suicide	
Rodrigues Castiglioni, Gabriel, 16	25 Nov	2022	Aracruz	Brazil	4	11	F	Sentenced to 3 years' compulsory detention	
Veltman, Nathaniel, 20	6 Jun	2021	London, Ontario	Canada	4	1	F	Sentenced to life in prison	
Anderson, David Nathaniel, 47 Graham, Francine, 50	10 Dec	2019	Jersey City, New Jersey	United States	4	3	F	Both killed by police	
Kurbegovic, Muharem, 31	6 Aug	1974	Los Angeles	United States	3	36	E	Sentenced to life in prison	
Diagne, Ndiaga, 53	1 March	2026	Austin, Texas	United States	3	15	F	Killed by police	
Lortie, Denis, 25	8 May	1984	Quebec City, Quebec	Canada	3	13	F	Sentenced to life imprisonment	
Legan, Santino William, 19	28 July	2019	Gilroy	United States	3	11	F	Committed suicide	
Dear, Robert Lewis, 57	27 Nov	2015	Colorado Springs, Colorado	United States	3	9	F	Found mentally unfit to stand trial	
Barrientos, Juan Fernando, 70	5–6 May	2024	Buenos Aires	Argentina	3	8	A	Sentenced to life imprisonment	
Liam Vazquez, Caleb, 18	18 May	2026	San Diego	United States	3	1	F	Committed suicide	
Palmeter, Ryan Christopher, 21	26 Aug	2023	Jacksonville, Florida	United States	3	0	F	Committed suicide	

== Asia ==
Perpetrator	Date	Year	Location	Country	Killed	Injured	W	Additional notes	Ref.
Hossein Takb'alizadeh, 20, Faraj Bazrkar, Fallah Mohammadi, Yadollah Mohammadpur	19 Aug	1978	Abadan	Iran	377-470	223+	A	Takb'alizadeh was executed in 1980; his three accomplices died in the fire	
Abdul Rahman al-Logari, 25	26 Aug	2021	Kabul	Afghanistan	181	150+	E	Committed suicide	
Two unknown men	22 Sep	2013	Peshawar	Pakistan	127	250	F E	Both committed suicide	
Ra'ed Mansour al-Banna, 32	28 Feb	2005	Hillah	Iraq	127	130	E	Committed suicide	
Dellosa, Redondo Cain, 31	27 Feb	2004	Corregidor or El Fraile	Philippines	116	0–9	E	Sentenced to life in prison for a separate case	
Kim Hyon-Hui, 25 (김현희) Kim Sung-il (김승일), 70	29 Nov	1987	Moscos Islands	(Myanmar) Burma	115	0	E	Sung-il committed suicide; Hyon-Hui was sentenced to death but pardoned	
Yunus Emre Alagöz, 25; Ömer Deniz Dündar, 22	10 Oct	2015	Ankara	Turkey	109	500+	E	Committed suicide bombings	
Ahmad Jafar Qasir, 19	11 Nov	1982	Tyre	Lebanon	89–102	55	E	Committed suicide car bombing	
Mohammad-Reza Kolahi, 22–23	28 June	1981	Tehran	Iran	74	30+	E	At large in the Netherlands until his murder in 2015	
Boboev, Abdurakhoan	4 March	2022	Peshawar	Pakistan	62	196	F E	Committed suicide	
Shahwani, Bilal, 25	24 May	2026	Quetta	Pakistan	47+	98+	E	Committed suicide bombing	
Two unknown men	3 Aug	2018	Gardez	Afghanistan	46	70+	F E	One killed by security One committed suicide	
Bulgarov, Rakim, Osmanov, Vadim, Unknown	28 June	2016	Istanbul	Turkey	45	230+	F E	Two committed suicide; one killed by security	
Dar, Adil Ahmad, 22	14 Feb	2019	Lethapora	India	40	35	E	Committed suicide bombing	
Abdukadi, Ablet; Ablipiz, Nurahmat; Mahmat, Memtimin; Memtimin, Memet; Memet, Raghimjan	22 May	2014	Ürümqi	China	39	90+	E V	Four committed suicide boming, surviving bomber sentenced to death	
Ibragimov, Ahmed, 43 (Ибрагимов, Ахмед)	8 Oct	1999	Mekenskaya, Chechnya	Russia	34+	20+	F	Killed by angry mob	
Şeyh Abdurrahman Alagöz, 20	20 July	2015	Suruç	Turkey	33	104	E	Committed suicide	
Two unknown men	1 Aug	2017	Herat	Afghanistan	33	66	F E	Both committed suicide	
Two unknown men	6 March	2020	Kabul	Afghanistan	32	82	F E	Both killed by police	
Khan, Yasir, 25–26	6 Feb	2026	Islamabad	Pakistan	31	170+	F E	Committed suicide bombing	
Kurban, Abdurehim; Abiti, Ahmed; Shartar, Mangshar; Tursun, Almira; Tohti, Patigul	1 March	2014	Kunming	China	31	143	M	Four killed by police; surviving assailant and three accomplices sentenced to life imprisonment	
Abdel-Basset Odeh, 25	27 March	2002	Netanya	Israel	30	160	E	Committed suicide	
Farooq, Ashraf Ali Mohammed; Yasin, Murtuza Hafiz	24/25 Sep	2002	Gandhinagar	India	30	80+	F E	Both killed by police	
Muhammad Zain al-Abidin Abu Uthman	22 June	2025	Damascus	Syria	30	54	F E	Committed suicide	
Goldstein, Baruch Kappel, 37 (ברוך קופל גולדשטיין)	25 Feb	1994	Hebron, West Bank	State of Palestine	29	125	F	Killed by surviving victims	
Abdulbaki Sömer, 27	17 Feb	2016	Ankara	Turkey	29	60	E	Committed suicide car bombing	
Two unknown men	12 Nov	2003	Nasiriyah	Iraq	28	103	F E	Both killed by a soldier	
Fahd Suleiman al-Qabba, 23	26 June	2015	Kuwait City	Kuwait	27	227	E	Committed suicide	
Okamoto, Kōzō; Okudaira, Tsuyoshi; Yasuda, Yasuyuki	30 May	1972	Lod	Israel	26	80	F E	One killed by accomplice; one committed suicide; one sentenced to life imprisonment and released after 13 years	
Bilal	27 Dec	2007	Rawalpindi	Pakistan	24	91	F E	Committed suicide	
Two unknown men	6 Sep	1986	Istanbul	Turkey	22	6	F E	Both died	
Jaradat, Hanadi Tayseer Abdul Malek, 28	4 Oct	2003	Haifa	Israel	21	51	E	Committed suicide	
Asadbek Madiyarov, 24	21 March	2024	Kandahar	Afghanistan	21+	50+	E	Died in the explosion	
Rahama Tullah		1980s/70s	Possibly Kabul	Afghanistan	21	47	E	Sentenced to death and executed	
Ahmed Ibrahim Al-Mughassil, 28; Ali Saed Bin Ali El-Hoorie, 30	25 June	1996	Khobar	Saudi Arabia	19	498	E	Both at large	
Ali Jan	11 Oct	2016	Kabul	Afghanistan	18	36	F E	Killed by police	
Ibrahim al-Thawr, Abdullah al-Misawa	12 Oct	2000	Aden	Yemen	17	37	E	Both committed suicide	
Kurbanjan Hemit, 28 (库尔班江·依明提); Abdurahman Azat, 33 (阿不都热合曼·阿扎提)	4 Aug	2008	Kashgar	China	16	16	MVE	Both sentenced to death and executed	
Bales, Robert, 38	11 March	2012	Najeeban & Alkozai	Afghanistan	16	6	FMA	Sentenced to life imprisonment Also killed a dog and cow	
Gurbanov, Oktay	19 March	1994	Baku	Azerbaijan	14	49	E	Died in the blast	
Two unknown men	24 Nov	2002	Jammu	India	14	45	F E	Both committed suicide	
Unknown	20 July	2001	Sheshnag	India	13–14	14–15	F E	Killed by police	
Aslanov, Lezghin Azer, 30	3 July	1994	Baku	Azerbaijan	13	42	E	Extradited from Russia to Azerbaijan in 1994 and sentenced to life imprisonment	
Hamed Badakhshan, 23	26 Oct	2022	Shiraz	Iran	13	40+	F	Killed by police	
Asmar Latin Sani, 26	5 Aug	2003	Jakarta	Indonesia	12	150	E	Committed suicide	
Yaşa, Eylem, 32	7 June	2016	Fatih, Istanbul	Turkey	12	51	E	Died in the bombing	
Two unknown men	30 March	2002	Jammu	India	11	20	F E	Both committed suicide	
Harphul Singh	23 July	1930	Tohana	British Raj	11–15	4	F A	Sentenced to death and executed Killed five people two years earlier	
Kulekbaev, Ruslan Alpysbayuly, 26 (Кулекбаев, Руслан Алпысбаевич)	17/18 July	2016	Almaty	Kazakhstan	10	10	F	Sentenced to death	
Tha'ir Kayid Hamad, 22 (ثائر كايد حماد)	3 March	2002	Ofra, West Bank	State of Palestine	10	6	F	Sentenced to life imprisonment	
Two unknown men	13 May	2017	Gwadar	Pakistan	10	1	F	Unsolved	
Ekmekjian, Levon, 25 (Լեւոն Էքմէքճեան); Sarkissian, Zohrab, 24 (Զօհրապ Սարգիսեան)	7 Aug	1982	Ankara	Turkey	9	72	F E	Sarkissian killed by police Ekmekjian sentenced to death and executed	
Two unknown men	17 Dec	2017	Quetta	Pakistan	9	57	F E	One killed by security One committed suicide	
Unknown	6 Aug	2002	Nunwan	India	9	31	F E	Killed by police	
Zhou Lanpu, (周兰普)	29 May	1981	Handan	China	9	15	FMV	Sentenced to death and executed	
Mohsin Yahya Munassar Al-Hilali, 38 (محسن يحيى منصر الهلالي)	30 July	2003	Mish'al	Yemen	9	1	F	Sentenced to death	
Masashi Daidōji, 26	30 Aug	1974	Tokyo	Japan	8	376+	E	Sentenced to death and died in prison from natural causes	
Unknown soldier	8 Nov	1988	Jessore	Bangladesh	8	50	F	Committed suicide	
Two unknown men	7 Oct	2005	Mong	Pakistan	8	20	F	Unsolved	
Punchi Banda Kandegedera	25 Feb	1936	Colombo	Ceylon	8	10	F	Sentenced to death	
Muhammad Chalaf Sahar, Rajab Muhammad, Hassan Muhammad	1 Oct	2024	Jaffa	Israel	7	17	FM	Killed	
Abu Lu'lu'a	31 Oct or 3 Nov	644	Medina	Rashidun Caliphate	7–10	3–6	M	Either was executed or committed suicide	
Ami Popper, 21 (עמי פופר)	20 May	1990	Rishon LeZion	Israel	7	11	F	Sentenced to seven consecutive life terms; Later reduced to 40 years in prison	
Ahmed Daqamseh, 26 (أحمد الدقامسة)	13 March	1997	Island of Peace	Jordan	7	6	F	Sentenced to 20 years in prison	
Kariyev, Maksat Kokshkinbaevich, 34 (Кариев, Максат Кокшкинбаевич)	12 Nov	2011	Taraz	Kazakhstan	7	3	F E	Committed suicide	
Khairi Musa Alqam, 21 (خيري موسى علقم)	27 Jan	2023	East Jerusalem	State of Palestine	7	3	F	Killed by police	
Omar Rub; Yousef Rub	28 Nov	2002	Beit She'an	Israel	6	34	F E	Both killed by police	
Abdul Salaam Sadek Hassouneh, 24 (عبد السلام صادق حسونة)	17 Jan	2002	Hadera	Israel	6	33	F E	Committed suicide	
Melod Najah (ميلود نجاح)	25 Nov	1987	Kiryat Shmona	Israel	6	7	F E	Killed by soldiers	
Uday Abu Jamal, 22 (عدي أبو جمل); Ghassan Muhammad Abu Jamal, 32 (غسان محمد أبو جمل)	18 Nov	2014	Jerusalem	Israel	6	7	FM	Both killed by police	
Two unknown men	12 March	2002	Matzuva	Israel	6	1	F E	Both killed by soldiers	
Unknown	29 April	2024	Guzara	Afghanistan	6	1	F	Escaped	
Unknown	23 Sep	2018	Shar-e-Safa	Afghanistan	6–8	?	F	Killed by soldiers	
Abdallah Ahmed Yahia Zeid Ghassan (عبد الله يحيى غسان)	March 5	2004	Dhamar	Yemen	5	30	F E	Committed suicide	
Ansari, Aftab; Nasir, Jamiluddin	22 Jan	2002	Kolkata	India	5	20	F	Both sentenced to death	
Ahmed Jassim Ibrahim, 24–25 (احمد جاسم ابراهيم)	12 June	2009	Baghdad	Iraq	5	12	F E	Killed by security	
Two unknown men	20 June	2002	Itamar, West Bank	Israel (de facto); State of Palestine (de jure)	5	10	F	Both killed by soldiers	
Two unknown men	13 March	2013	Srinagar	India	5	10	F E	Both killed by police	
Shuja al-Dosari, 20 (شجاع الدوسري)	16 Oct	2015	Saihat	Saudi Arabia	5	9	F	Killed by police	
Two unknown men	12 Dec	2004	Philadelphi Route, Gaza Strip	State of Palestine	5	6	F E	Both killed by soldiers	
Ayman Mohamed Hassan Mohamed, 23 (أيمن محمد حسن محمد)	25 Nov	1990	Eilat	Israel	4	27	F	Sentenced to 12 years	
Natan-Zada, Eden, 19 (עדן נתן-זדה)	4 Aug	2005	Shfar'am	Israel	4	12	F	Killed by angry mob	
Khaled Muhammad Musa Makhamra, 21 (خالد محمد موسى مخمر); Muhammad Ahmad Musa Makhamreh, 21 (محمد أحمد موسى مخامرة)	8 June	2016	Tel Aviv	Israel	4	7	F	Both sentenced to life imprisonment	
Weisgan, Asher, 42	17 August	2005	Shilo	Israel (de facto) State of Palestine (de jure)	4	1	F M	Sentenced to life imprisonment Later committed suicide in jail	
Ibrahim Mohammed Hasuna, 20 (إبراهيم محمد محمود حسونة)	5 March	2002	Tel Aviv	Israel	3	35	FME	Killed by police	
Ebrahim Nemer, 30 (ابراهيم نمر); Murad Nemer, 38 (مراد نمر)	30 Nov	2023	Jerusalem	(Israel)	3	16	F	Killed by soldiers Terminated a pregnancy	
Ibrahim al-Akri, 38 (إبراهيم العكاري)	5 Nov	2014	Jerusalem	Israel	3	13	MV	Killed by police	
Hazem, Raad, 28 (رعد غانم)	7 April	2022	Tel Aviv	Israel	3	11	F	Killed by police	
Hussein Qaqawa, 31	10 Feb	2023	East Jerusalem	Israel	3	4	V	Killed by police	

== Europe ==
Perpetrator	Date	Year	Location	Country	Killed	Injured	W	Additional notes	Ref.
Zadgorski, Petar Abadzhiev, Petar; Pavlov, Asen; Petrov, Nikola	16 April	1925	Sofia	Bulgaria	213	500+	E	Abadzhiev, Pavlov, and Petrov escaped to the Soviet Union; Zadgorski was captured, sentenced to death and executed	
Dalerjon Mirzoyev, 32; Saidakrami Rachabalizoda, 30; Shamsidin Fariduni, 25; Muhammadsobir Faizov, 19	22 March	2024	Moscow	Russia	151	609	FME	Sentenced to life imprisonment	
Lahouaiej-Bouhlel, Mohamed Salmene, 31	14 July	2016	Nice	France	86	434	F V	Killed by police	
Breivik, Anders Behring, 32	22 July	2011	Oslo & Utøya	Norway	75	241	F E	Sentenced to 21 years in prison Two more died trying to escape	
Lindsay, Germaine Maurice, 19; Mir Hussain, Hasib, 18; Tanweer, Shehzad, 22; Khan, Mohammad Sidique, 30	7 July	2005	London	United Kingdom	52	784	E	All committed suicide bombings	
Masharipov, Abdulkadir, 28	1 Jan	2017	Istanbul	Turkey	39	79	F	Sentenced to life imprisonment	
Yevyolev, Magomed, 20	24 Jan	2011	Moscow	Russia	37	173	E	Committed suicide bombing	
El Bakraoui, Ibrahim, 29; Laacharoui, Najim, 24; El Bakraoui, Khalid, 27	22 March	2016	Brussels	Belgium	32	340	E	All committed suicide bombings	
Morral Roca, Mateu, 25	31 May / 2 June	1906	Madrid	Spain	30	100+	F E	Committed suicide	
Abedi, Salman Ramadan, 22	22 May	2017	Manchester	United Kingdom	22	239	E	Committed suicide bombing 778 others suffered psychological damage	
Osman Omarov, 31; Abdusamad Amadziev, 32; Gadzhimurad Kagirov, 28; Dalgat Daudov, 42 or 43; Ali Zakarigaev, 35	23 June	2024	Dagestan	Russia	22	45	F A	Killed by police	
Guzy, Antoni	28 Aug	1939	Tarnów	Poland	20	35	E	Summarily executed during the Invasion of Poland	
Fieschi, Giuseppe Marco, 44	28 July	1835	Paris	France	18	22	F	Sentenced to death and executed Also killed a horse	
Abouyaaqoub, Younes, 22	17 Aug	2017	Barcelona	Spain	15	131	M V	Shot and killed by police on August 21	
Jalilov, Akbarzhon, 22	3 April	2017	Saint Petersburg	Russia	15	108	E	Committed suicide	
Lardanchet, Jean-Pierre, 36; Friedli, André, 39	15/16 Dec	1995	Vercors	France	14	0	FMO	Both committed suicide	
Köhler, Gundolf, 21	26 Sep	1980	Munich	West Germany	12	211	E	Killed by the explosion	
Amri, Anis Ben Othman, 24	19 Dec	2016	Berlin; Milan	Germany; Italy	12	55	FMV	Killed by police One of the victims died in 2021 after sustaining injuries from debris during the emergency response	
Kouachi, Saïd, 34; Kouachi, Chérif, 32	7 Jan	2015	Paris	France	12	11	F	Both killed by police	
Rathjen, Tobias, 43	19 Feb	2020	Hanau	Germany	11	4	F	Committed suicide Terminated a pregnancy One of the victims died in 2026; attributed to this event	
Sonboly, David, 18	22 July	2016	Munich	Germany	9	4	F	Committed suicide	
Adnan, Mohamed Sozad, 21	11 July	1988	Cruise ship City of Poros	Greece	8	98	F E	Committed suicide	
Butt, Khuram Shazad, 27; Redouane, Rachid, 30; Zaghba, Youssef, 22	3 June	2017	London	United Kingdom	8	48	M V	All three were killed by police	
Merah, Mohammed (محمد مراح), 23	11–22 March	2012	Toulouse & Montauban	France	7	6	F	Killed by police	
El-Husseini, Mohamad Hassan, 25	18 Jul	2012	Burgas	Bulgaria	6	32	E	Committed suicide bombing	
Two unknown men	14 Dec	1998	Peć	(Serbia and Montenegro) FR Yugoslavia	6	15	F	Unsolved	
Two unknown men	18 June	1994	Loughinisland, Northern Ireland	United Kingdom	6	5	F	Unsolved	
Two unknown men	2 July	1976	Antrim, Northern Ireland	United Kingdom	6	3	F	Unsolved	
Shafik al-Arid, 22; Talal Khantourah, 21	5 Aug	1973	Athens	Greece	5	55	F E	Pleaded guilty	
Masood, Khalid, 52	22 March	2017	London, England	United Kingdom	5	49	MV	Killed by police	
de Saint-Régeant, Pierre Robinault, 32	24 Dec	1800	Paris	France	5	26	E	Sentenced to death and executed	
Coulibaly, Amedy, 32	7–9 Jan	2015	Montrouge & Porte de Vincennes	France	5	11	F	Killed by police	
Chekatt, Chérif, 29	11 Dec	2018	Strasbourg	France	5	11	FM	Killed by police	
Two unknown men	5 Feb	1992	Belfast, Northern Ireland	United Kingdom	5	9	F	Unsolved	
Elosegi, José Javier Zabaleta; Irujo, Juan María Tapia	3 Nov	1980	Zarautz	Spain	5	5	F	Elosegi sentenced to 200 years in prison Irujo sentenced to 66 years in prison	
Diab, Hassan, 26 (accused)	3 Oct	1980	Paris	France	4	46	E	Convicted in absentia, facing extradition for the 1980 Paris synagogue bombing	
Fejzullai, Kujtim, 20	2 Nov	2020	Vienna	Austria	4	23	FM	Killed by police	
Lakdim, Redouane, 25	23 March	2018	Carcassonne & Trèbes	France	4	15	FM	Killed by police	
Tanis, Gökmen, 37	18 March	2019	Utrecht	Netherlands	4	6	F	Sentenced to life imprisonment	
Fuchs, Franz, 45	5 Feb	1995	Oberwart	Austria	4	0	E	Also injured dozens in other attacks Sentenced to life imprisonment Committed suicide in jail	
Copeland, David James, 22	17/24/30 April	1999	London	United Kingdom	3	140	E	Sentenced to six concurrent life sentences Terminated a pregnancy	
Stone, Michael Anthony, 32	16 March	1988	Belfast, Northern Ireland	United Kingdom	3	60+	F E	Sentenced to 682 years in prison	

== Oceania ==
Perpetrator	Date	Year	Location	Country	Killed	Injured	W	Additional notes	Ref.
Tarrant, Brenton Harrison, 28	15 March	2019	Christchurch	New Zealand	51	40	F	Sentenced to life without parole	
Akram, Naveed, 24 (accused); Akram, Sajid, 50	14 Dec	2025	Sydney	Australia	15	39	F	Sajid was killed; Naveed was taken into custody	
Mullah Abdullah, 60; Gool, Badsha Mahommed, 40	1 Jan	1915	Broken Hill, New South Wales	Australia	4	7	F	Both killed by police	
Unknown	13 Feb	1978	Sydney, New South Wales	Australia	3	11	E	Evan Pederick, 22, confessed to planting the bomb and was convicted of involvement in the attack but was released from prison	
Train, Nathaniel, 46 Train, Gareth, 47; Train, Stacey, 45	12 Dec	2022	Wieambilla, Queensland	Australia	3	1	F A	All killed by police	

== Abbreviations and footnotes ==
The W-column gives a basic description of the weapons used in the murders

F – Firearms and other ranged weapons, especially rifles and handguns, but also bows and crossbows, grenade launchers, flamethrowers, or slingshots
M – Melee weapons, like knives, swords, spears, machetes, axes, clubs, rods, rocks, or bare hands
O – Any other weapons, such as bombs, hand grenades, Molotov cocktails, poison and poisonous gas, as well as vehicle and arson attacks

A – indicates that an arson attack was the only other weapon used
V – indicates that a vehicle was the only other weapon used (vehicle as a weapon)
E – indicates that explosives of any sort were the only other weapon used
P – indicates that an anaesthetising or deadly substance of any kind was the only other weapon used (includes poisonous gas)
