= List of terrorist incidents in 2002 =

This is a timeline of incidents in 2002 that have been labelled as "terrorism" and are not believed to have been carried out by a government or its forces (see state terrorism and state-sponsored terrorism).

== Guidelines ==
- To be included, entries must be notable (have a stand-alone article) and described by a consensus of reliable sources as "terrorism".
- List entries must comply with the guidelines outlined in the manual of style under MOS:TERRORIST.
- Casualty figures in this list are the total casualties of the incident including immediate casualties and later casualties (such as people who succumbed to their wounds long after the attacks occurred).
- Casualties listed are the victims. Perpetrator casualties are listed separately (e.g. x (+y) indicate that x victims and y perpetrators were killed/injured).
- Casualty totals may be underestimated or unavailable due to a lack of information. A figure with a plus (+) sign indicates that at least that many people have died (e.g. 10+ indicates that at least 10 people have died) – the actual toll could be considerably higher. A figure with a plus (+) sign may also indicate that over that number of people are victims.
- If casualty figures are 20 or more, they will be shown in **bold**. In addition, figures for casualties more than 50 will also be **underlined**.
- Incidents are limited to one per location per day. If multiple attacks occur in the same place on the same day, they will be merged into a single incident.
- In addition to the guidelines above, the table also includes the following categories:

0 people were killed/injured by the incident.
1–19 people were killed/injured by the incident.
20–49 people were killed/injured by the incident.
50–99 people were killed/injured by the incident.
100+ people were killed/injured by the incident.

== List ==
Total incidents listed: 62

Date	Type	Deaths	Injuries	Location	Details	Perpetrator(s)	Part of
January	Attack attempt	0	0	Singapore	Singapore embassies attack plot foiled.	Jemaah Islamiyah	
January 17	Shooting	6 (+1)	33	Hadera, Israel	Bat Mitzvah massacre: A Palestinian gunman opened fire on a Bat Mitzvah celebration.	Al-Aqsa Martyrs' Brigades	Second Intifada
January 22	Shooting	5	20	Kolkata, India	2002 attack on American cultural centre in Kolkata: Gunmen on motorcycles opened fire on guards at the American Center, killing five people.	HuJI	
January 25	Suicide bombing	0 (+1)	25	Tel Aviv, Israel	2002 Tel Aviv outdoor mall bombing: 25 people were wounded when a Palestinian suicide bomber detonated explosives outside a cafe on a pedestrian mall near the old central bus station.	Palestinian Islamic Jihad	Second Intifada
January 27	Suicide bombing	1 (+1)	140	Jerusalem, Israel	Jaffa Street bombing: A female Palestinian suicide bomber blew herself up, killing 2 and injuring 140. The terrorist, identified as a Fatah member, was armed with more than 10 kilos of explosives.	Fatah	Second Intifada
February 16	Suicide bombing	3 (+1)	27	Karnei Shomron	Karnei Shomron Mall suicide bombing: Two teenagers were killed and about 30 people were wounded, six seriously, when a suicide bomber blew himself up at a pizzeria in a shopping mall. A third person subsequently died of his injuries. The Popular Front for the Liberation of Palestine claimed responsibility for the attack.	Popular Front for the Liberation of Palestine	Second Intifada
March 2	Suicide bombing	11 (+1)	50+	Jerusalem, Israel	Yeshivat Beit Yisrael massacre: 11 people were killed and over 50 were injured, 4 critically, in a suicide bombing near a yeshiva where people had gathered for a bar mitzvah celebration. The terrorist detonated the bomb next to a group of women waiting with their baby carriages for their husbands to leave the nearby synagogue. The Fatah Al-Aqsa Martyrs Brigade took responsibility for the attack.	Fatah; Al-Aqsa Martyrs Brigade	Second Intifada
March 5	Shooting	3 (+1)	15	Tel Aviv, Israel	Seafood Market attack: Three people, including Druze police officer Salim Barakat was killed when a terrorist opened fire on two adjacent restaurants.		Second Intifada
March 9	Suicide bombing	11 (+1)	54	Jerusalem, Israel	Café Moment bombing: 11 people were killed and 54 injured, 10 of them seriously, when a suicide bomber exploded in the crowded Moment cafe. Hamas claimed responsibility for the attack.	Hamas	Second Intifada
March 12	Ambush	6 (+2)	1	Matzuva, Israel	Matzuva attack: Two Islamic Jihad members opened fire on Israeli civilians traveling along a road.	Islamic Jihad	Second Intifada
March 20	Suicide bombing	7 (+1)	27	Afula, Israel	Umm al-Fahm bus bombing: Four soldiers and three others were killed, and about 30 wounded, several seriously, in a suicide bombing of an Egged bus. The Islamic Jihad claimed responsibility for the attack.	Islamic Jihad	Second Intifada
March 21	Suicide bombing	3 (+1)	86	Jerusalem, Israel	King George Street bombing: Three people were killed and 86 injured, 3 of them seriously, in a suicide bombing in the center. The terrorist detonated the bomb, packed with metal spikes and nails, in the center of a crowd of shoppers. The Fatah Al-Aqsa Martyrs' Brigades claimed responsibility for the attack.	Al-Aqsa Martyrs' Brigades	Second Intifada
March 27	Suicide bombing	30 (+1)	140	Netanya, Israel	Passover massacre: A Palestinian suicide bomber kills 30 and injures 140 during Passover festivities in a hotel.	Hamas	Second Intifada
March 29	Suicide bombing	2 (+1)	28	Jerusalem, Israel	Kiryat HaYovel supermarket bombing: Two people were killed and 28 injured, two seriously, when a female suicide bomber blew herself up in a supermarket. The Fatah Al-Aqsa Martyrs' Brigades took responsibility.	Fatah; Al-Aqsa Martyrs' Brigades	Second Intifada
March 30	Shooting, suicide bombing	11 (+2)	20	Jammu, India	2002 Raghunath temple attacks: Two suicide attackers open fire on the Raghunath Temple before blowing themselves up. This was the first of two attacks on this temple in 2002.	Lashkar-e-Taiba	Insurgency in Jammu and Kashmir
March 31	Suicide bombing	16 (+1)	40+	Haifa, Israel	Matza restaurant suicide bombing: A Hamas suicide bomber kills 15 and injures over 40.	Hamas	Second Intifada
April 10	Suicide bombing	8 (+1)	22	Kibbutz Yagur, east of Haifa, Israel	Yagur Junction bombing: Eight people were killed and 22 injured in a suicide bombing on an Egged bus. Hamas claimed responsibility for the attack.	Hamas	Second Intifada
April 11	Truck bombing	19 (+1)	30+	Djerba, Tunisia	Ghriba synagogue bombing: A natural gas truck fitted with explosives is driven into a synagogue by an al-Qaeda member, killing 20 and wounding more than 30.	al-Qaeda	Insurgency in the Maghreb
April 12	Suicide bombing	6 (+1)	104	Jerusalem, Israel	2002 Mahane Yehuda Market bombing: Six people were killed and 104 wounded when a female suicide bomber detonated at the entrance to Mahane Yehuda open-air market. The Al-Aqsa Martyrs' Brigades claimed responsibility.	Al-Aqsa Martyrs' Brigades	Second Intifada
May 2	Mortar bombing	119	98	Colombia	Bojayá massacre: FARC launches a mortar bomb against a church during combat with AUC, killing at least 117 civilians, 48 of whom were children.	FARC	Colombian conflict
May 6	Assassination	1	0	Hilversum, Netherlands	Assassination of Pim Fortuyn: Right wing politician Pim Fortuyn is assassinated by far left extremist Volkert van der Graaf who said he was worried about Fortuyn getting in power and targeting immigrants and Muslims as scapegoats .	Volkert van der Graaf	Terrorism in Netherlands
May 7	Suicide bombing	15 (+1)	57	Rishon LeZion, Israel	Sheffield Club bombing: 16 people were killed and 55 wounded in a suicide bombing in a crowded game club, which caused part of the building to collapse. Hamas claimed responsibility for the attack.	Hamas	Second Intifada
May 8	Bombing	13 (+1)	40	Karachi, Pakistan	The 2002 Karachi bus bombing kills eleven Frenchmen and two Pakistanis	Al-Qaeda (suspected)	Terrorism in Pakistan
May 9	Bombing	44	133	Kaspiysk, Russia	2002 Kaspiysk bombing: A bomb explosion in Dagestan kills at least 42 people and injures 130 or more during Victory Day festivities.	Shariat Jamaat	Second Chechen War
May 13	Sabotage	12	80	Jaunpur, India	Jaunpur train crash: Twelve people are killed when Islamic extremists cut rails to a train.	Students Islamic Movement of India	Terrorism in India
May 14	Shooting	31	47	Kaluchak, India	2002 Kaluchak massacre: Three LeT militants open fire on a tourist bus filled with mainly Indian Army personnel and their families.	Lashkar-e-Taiba	Insurgency in Jammu and Kashmir
May 19	Suicide bombing	3 (+1)	59	Netanya, Israel	Netanya Market bombing: Three people were killed and 59 injured, 10 seriously, when a suicide bomber, disguised as a soldier, blew himself up in a market. Both Hamas and the PFLP took responsibility for the attack.	Hamas; PFLP	Second Intifada
May 23	Car bombing	0	0	Tel Aviv, Israel	Pi Glilot bombing attempt: Disaster was averted when sprinklers put out a fire after a diesel truck was detonated in a gas depot. The bombing could have caused a chain reaction, killing thousands of people.	Hamas	Second Intifada
June 5	Car bomb	17 (+1)	38	Afula, Israel	Megiddo Junction bus bombing: 17 people were killed and 38 injured when a car packed with explosives struck an Egged bus at the Megiddo Junction. The bus, which burst into flames, was completely destroyed. The terrorist was killed in the blast. The Islamic Jihad claimed responsibility for the attack.	Islamic Jihad	Second Intifada
June 11	Suicide bombing	1 (+1)	15	Herzliya, Israel	2002 Herzliya shawarma restaurant bombing: A 14-year-old girl was killed and 15 others were wounded when a Palestinian suicide bomber set off a pipe bomb at a restaurant.	Al-Aqsa Martyrs' Brigades	Second Intifada
June 14	Suicide car bombing	12 (+1)	51	Karachi, Pakistan	2002 U.S. consulate attack in Karachi: A car bomb at US Consulate kills 12	Al-Qaeda (suspected)	
June 18	Suicide bombing	19 (+1)	74+	Jerusalem, Israel	Patt Junction Bus bombing: A Hamas suicide bomber detonates himself on a bus. The attack kills 19 people and wounds over 74.	Hamas	Second Intifada
June 19	Suicide bombing	7 (+1)	50	Jerusalem, Israel	2002 French Hill suicide bombing: Seven people were killed and 50 injured, three critically, when a suicide bomber blew himself up at the French Hill bus stop. The Fatah Al-Aqsa Martyrs' Brigades claimed responsibility for the attack.	Fatah; Al-Aqsa Martyrs' Brigades	Second Intifada
June 20	Shooting	5 (+2)	10	Itamar	2002 Itamar attack: Two PFLP gunmen raid an Israeli settler house and kill a mother and three of her children and wound two other children. They also kill an Israeli commando before they are killed by Israeli forces. Eight more Israelis were wounded during the attack.	PFLP	Second Intifada
July 4	Shooting	2 (+1)	0	Los Angeles, United States	2002 LAX shooting: An Egyptian gunman opens fire at an El Al ticket counter in Los Angeles International Airport, killing two Israelis before being killed himself.	Hesham Mohamed Hadayet	Israeli–Palestinian conflict
July 13	Massacre	29	~30	Jammu, India	2002 Qasim Nagar massacre: 29 Hindus are massacred by Islamic extremists in the suburb of Qasim Nagar	Lashkar-e-Taiba	Insurgency in Jammu and Kashmir
July 16	Bomb, shooting	9	20	Bnei Brak–Emmanuel, Israel	2002 Immanuel bus attack: Nine people were killed and 20 injured in a terrorist attack on a bus traveling from Bnei Brak to Emmanuel. An explosive charge was detonated next to the bullet-resistant bus. The terrorists waited in ambush, reportedly wearing Israeli army uniforms, and opened fire on the bus. While four terror organizations claimed responsibility for the attack, it was apparently carried out by the same Hamas cell which carried out the attack in Emmanuel on December 12, 2001.	Hamas	Second Intifada
July 17	Suicide bombings	5 (+2)	40	Tel Aviv, Israel	Neve Shaanan Street bombing: Five people were killed – two Israeli and three foreign workers – and about 40 were injured, four seriously, in a double suicide bombing on Neve Shaanan Street near the old central bus station. The Islamic Jihad claimed responsibility for the attack.	Islamic Jihad	Second Intifada
July 31	Bombing	9 (+1)	100+	Israel	Hebrew University bombing: Nine people were killed and 85 wounded, 14 of them seriously, when a bomb exploded in the Frank Sinatra student center cafeteria on the Hebrew University's Mt. Scopus campus. The explosive device was planted inside the cafeteria, which was gutted by the explosion. Hamas claimed responsibility for the attack.	Hamas	Second Intifada
August 4	Suicide bombing	9 (+1)	50	Meron, Israel	Meron Junction Bus 361 attack: Nine people were killed and some 50 wounded in a suicide bombing of an Egged bus at the Meron junction in the Galilee. Hamas claimed responsibility for the attack.	Hamas	Second Intifada
August 19	Shootdown	127	20	Khankala, Russia	2002 Khankala Mi-26 crash: A group of Chechen rebels shoot down a Russian helicopter carrying over 140 soldiers over a minefield. This event is the deadliest incident in helicopter aviation history,	ChRI	Second Chechen War
September 5	Suicide car bombing	30	167	Kabul, Afghanistan	2002 Kabul bombing: A suicide bomber detonated a car bomb.	Taliban	War in Afghanistan
September 10	Train derailment	130+	150+	Rafiganj, India	A train derailment kills 130 people in the Rafiganj rail disaster. Naxalite terrorism is suspected.	Naxalites (suspected)	
September 19	Bombing	6 (+1)	70	Tel Aviv, Israel	Allenby Street bus bombing: Six people were killed and about 70 wounded when a terrorist detonated a bomb in a bus opposite the Great Synagogue. Hamas claimed responsibility for the attack.	Hamas	Second Intifada
September 25	Raid	30 (+2)	80	Ahmedabad, India	Akshardham Temple attack: Two terrorists belonging to the Jaish-e-Mohammed group raid the Akshardham temple complex, killing 30 people and injuring many more.	Jaish-e-Mohammed	
October 2–21	Bombings	11	180	Zamboanga City, Philippines	The Zamboanga bombings kills 11 and wounds about 180.	Abu Sayyaf (suspected)	Moro conflict
October 2–24	Shootings	10	3	Beltway, United States	Beltway sniper attacks: John Allen Muhammad and Lee Boyd Malvo conduct a series of sniper attacks in several locations throughout the Baltimore-Washington Metropolitan Area from October 2 until they were arrested on October 24. The attacks killed 10 and wounded 3 others. They were later found to have killed seven other people and wounded seven more across the nation over the past several months.	John Allen Muhammad and Lee Boyd Malvo	
October 6	Bombing	1	12	Off of Aden, Yemen	Limburg tanker bombing: One crew member was killed and 12 other crew members were injured in a bombing of a ship carrying 397,000 barrels of crude oil.	Al-Qaeda	
October 8	Shooting	1 (+2)	1	Faylaka Island, Kuwait	Faylaka Island attack: Two Kuwaitis opened fire on U.S. Marines conducting a training exercise. The two attackers and one marine were killed.	Al-Qaeda; Taliban	
October 11	Bombing	6 (+1)	166	Vantaa, Finland	Myyrmanni bombing: A bomb kills 7 people including the perpetrator and wounds 166 people at a shopping mall.	Petri Gerdt	
October 12	Bombings	202 (+2)	209	Bali, Indonesia	The 2002 Bali bombings kill 202 people, mostly western tourists and local hospitality staff.	Jemaah Islamiyah	
October 21	Car bomb	14 (+2)	50	Wadi Ara to Hadera, Israel	Karkur junction suicide bombing: 14 people were killed and some 50 wounded when a car bomb containing about 100 kilograms of explosives was detonated next to an intercity bus. The bus had pulled over at a stop when the suicide bomber, driving a jeep, approached from behind and exploded. The Islamic Jihad claimed responsibility for the attack.	Islamic Jihad	Second Intifada
October 23–26	Hostage crisis	133 (+40)	700+	Moscow, Russia	The Moscow theater hostage crisis kills 133 hostages and some 40 terrorists upon rescue.	Riyad-us Saliheen Brigade of Martyrs; Islamic International Brigade; Special Purpose Islamic Regiment	Second Chechen War
October 30	Bombings	1	3	Soweto, South Africa	2002 Soweto bombings: Eight bombings target a mosque, the Nan Hua Temple as well as railways and petrol stations across the city. One woman is killed and her husband and two other people were injured. A group calling itself "Warriors of the Boer Nation" claimed responsibility.	Warriors of the Boer Nation	
November 21	Suicide bombing	11 (+1)	50+	Jerusalem, Israel	Hamas orchestrates the Jerusalem bus 20 massacre. 11 people were killed and over 50 wounded when a suicide bomber detonated on a crowded bus.	Hamas	Second Intifada
November 24	Shooting, suicide bombing	14 (+2)	45	Jammu, India	2002 Raghunath temple attacks: Two suicide attackers open fire on the Raghunath Temple before blowing themselves up. This was the second of two attacks on this temple in 2002.	Lashkar-e-Taiba	Insurgency in Jammu and Kashmir
November 27	Shooting	6 (+2)	34	Beit She'an, Israel	2002 Beit She'an attack: Two Palestinians opened fire on a Likud polling station.	Al-Aqsa Martyrs' Brigades	Second Intifada
November 27	Suicide car bombing	0 (+1)	0	Gaza, Israel	A suicide bomber from the Popular Front for the Liberation of Palestine rammed a car bomb into an empty building near Gaza's main Erez crossing terminal to Israel killing only himself.	PFLP	Second Intifada
November 28	Bombing, attempted shootdown	13 (+3)	80	Mombasa, Kenya	2002 Mombasa attacks: An Israeli hotel is bombed, killing 13 people (10 Kenyans and 3 Israeli tourists). At nearly the same time, two missiles were fired at an Israeli plane taking off nearby but missed.	Al-Qaeda (suspected)	
December 2	Bombing	2	50	Mumbai, India	2002 Mumbai bus bombing: A bomb placed under a seat of a B.E.S.T. bus explodes and kills two people.	Lashkar-e-Taiba (suspected)	
December 21	Train derailing	20	80	Kurnool, India	Kurnool train crash: Islamic extremists derail a train and kill 20 people.	Lashkar-e-Taiba	
December 27	Car bombings	83 (+3)	210	Grozny, Russia	2002 Grozny truck bombing: The truck bombing of the Chechen parliament kills 83 people.	Riyad-us Saliheen Brigade of Martyrs	Second Chechen War

== See also ==
- List of terrorist incidents
- List of Palestinian suicide attacks
- List of Palestinian rocket attacks on Israel, 2001–2006
