= Sajal =

Sajal (سجل) is a given name in Asia and may refer to:

- Sajal Aly (born 1994), Pakistani actress and model
- Sajal Barui (born c. 1977), Indian criminal
- Sajal K. Das, American scientist and engineer
- Sajal Nag, Indian historian
