= Pirmin Treku =

Basque-born ballet dancer, teacher and choreographer (1930–2006)

- Born: Fermín Aldabaldetreku Arruti; March 13, 1930; Zarautz, Gipuzkoa, Spain
- Died: July 13, 2006 (aged 76); San Sebastián, Spain
- Other names: Pirmin Trecu
- Occupations: Ballet dancer, teacher, choreographer
- Years active: 1945–1990s
- Career
- Former groups: Sadler's Wells Ballet / The Royal Ballet; Grupo de Bailado do Porto

Pirmin Treku (born Fermín Aldabaldetreku Arruti; 13 March 1930 – 13 July 2006) was a Basque-born Spanish ballet dancer, teacher and choreographer. Under the stage name Pirmin Trecu (later Basque-ised as Treku), he became a principal dancer with Sadler's Wells Ballet (later The Royal Ballet) in London, where he was especially noted for his interpretation of the Boy in Andrée Howard's La Fête étrange and for leading roles in works by Ninette de Valois, Frederick Ashton, John Cranko, Kenneth MacMillan and George Balanchine.

A child refugee from the Spanish Civil War, Treku was evacuated from the Basque Country to Britain in 1937 aboard the ship Habana and grew up in exile in England. He trained on scholarship at the Sadler's Wells Ballet School under de Valois and a generation of Russian and European émigré teachers, and in 1948 was reportedly the first foreign-born dancer to be engaged at principal rank by Sadler's Wells Ballet.

After a knee injury ended his stage career in 1961, Treku settled in Porto, Portugal. There he founded the Academia de Bailado Clássico Pirmin Treku and the Grupo de Bailado do Porto (later known as the Companhia de Bailado do Porto), which became important centres for classical ballet in northern Portugal. Over four decades of teaching he trained several generations of Portuguese dancers, including future members and artistic leaders of the Companhia Nacional de Bailado and Ballet Gulbenkian.

== Early life ==
Treku was born on 13 March 1930 in the San Pelayo neighbourhood of Zarautz, Gipuzkoa, in Spain's Basque Country. His father was a prominent Basque nationalist; the family name, Aldabaldetreku, is of rural Basque origin.

During the Spanish Civil War, the seven-year-old Fermín and his two older sisters were among some 4,000 Basque children evacuated from Bilbao to Southampton in May 1937, aboard the ship Habana as part of the “niños de la guerra” (Basque war children) exodus. The children were housed in colonies in southern England; the Aldabaldetreku siblings were placed in a home in Kent, while their parents went into exile in France and Latin America.

Growing up in Britain, he initially studied drawing and the fine arts. In the mid-1940s, after seeing a performance of Ashton's ballet Les Patineurs, he decided to pursue dance and presented himself for an audition with Dame Ninette de Valois, founder of the Sadler's Wells Ballet. De Valois recognised his potential and arranged a scholarship for him at the Sadler's Wells Ballet School in London.

At this point he adopted the more manageable stage name “Pirmin Trecu” (later written “Treku” in Basque settings), explaining that English colleagues found “Aldabaldetreku” too long and difficult to pronounce. His formal training brought him into contact with teachers such as Lydia Kyasht, Olga Preobrajenska, George Goncharov, Vera Volkova and Tamara Karsavina, who coached him in roles from works like Fokine’s Carnaval and Les Sylphides.

== Career with Sadler’s Wells and The Royal Ballet ==
=== Training and early career ===
Treku entered the Sadler’s Wells Ballet School in 1944 and made his stage debut the following year with the Sadler’s Wells Theatre Ballet, the junior touring company. In 1947, at the age of 17, he was promoted to the main Sadler’s Wells Ballet company at the Royal Opera House, Covent Garden.

His rise within the company was rapid. In 1948 he was elevated to principal dancer, and contemporary accounts describe him as the first foreign-born dancer to be contracted at the company’s highest rank. In the post-war “golden age” of the company he danced alongside figures such as Margot Fonteyn, Robert Helpmann and Michael Somes, and worked closely with resident choreographers including Ashton and de Valois.

=== Repertory and notable roles ===
Treku's most celebrated role was the Country Boy in Andrée Howard's La Fête étrange, based on Alain-Fournier's novel Le Grand Meaulnes. He first danced the role with Sadler's Wells Theatre Ballet in the late 1940s and later at Covent Garden, where critics praised the mixture of adolescent awkwardness and lyricism he brought to the part. La Fête étrange remained closely associated with him, and he chose it for his farewell performance in 1961, after which he was presented on stage with a laurel crown by his colleagues.

He was also noted for his dramatic character work. In de Valois's The Rake’s Progress he created the title role of the Libertine in the early 1950s, a performance remembered for its strong dramatic profile. With his Basque–Spanish background he was frequently cast in works with Spanish colour: he enjoyed particular success as the Miller in Léonide Massine's The Three-Cornered Hat, where reviewers highlighted his rhythmic precision and authentic Spanish style.

Alongside these roles, Treku danced much of the classical repertory, including the Bluebird in The Sleeping Beauty, the Nutcracker Prince in The Nutcracker, Franz in Coppélia, the Swan Lake pas de trois and the peasant pas de deux in Giselle. He appeared in premieres or early casts of works by Cranko (Sea Change, Pastorale, Prince of the Pagodas), MacMillan (Danses Concertantes, Anon), Ashton (Ondine) and Balanchine (Trumpet Concerto).

Despite being relatively small in stature for a male dancer, he was admired for his clean classical line, strong jumps and dramatic intensity. Obituaries in later years described him as an “exceptional figure” among Spanish male dancers and as a compelling danseur noble of the Royal Ballet's mid-century period.

=== Retirement from the stage ===
In 1961, after approximately fifteen seasons in London, a chronic injury to his right knee forced Treku to retire from performing while still in his early thirties. His final appearance with The Royal Ballet was in La Fête étrange at Covent Garden, closing a stage career that had taken him from refugee child to principal dancer at one of the leading ballet companies of the time.

== Teaching and career in Portugal ==
Immediately after his retirement, Treku decided to devote himself to teaching. Although de Valois encouraged him to remain in London as an instructor, he preferred to return to the Iberian Peninsula on his own terms and declined to settle in Francoist Spain, where he still felt in exile. In 1961 he accepted an invitation from the private Escola Parnaso, an arts-oriented school in Porto, to teach classical ballet, and he moved to the city that would become his home for more than four decades.

In 1963 he founded his own school in Porto, the Academia de Bailado Clássico Pirmin Trecu (later standardised as Pirmin Treku). The academy offered a rigorous classical curriculum modelled on British training, and Treku affiliated it with the Imperial Society of Teachers of Dancing (ISTD), entering students for ISTD examinations and regularly inviting examiners from the United Kingdom to evaluate them in Porto. He also took selected pupils abroad to international summer courses such as the Yorkshire Ballet Seminars so that they could work with visiting international teachers.

Over the following decades the academy became one of the principal centres for classical ballet in northern Portugal, noted for its disciplined training and for sending students into professional careers. Among Treku's pupils were future members of the Companhia Nacional de Bailado (CNB), Ballet Gulbenkian and overseas companies. His long-time assistants Bárbara Guedes and Maria José Rodrigues, themselves former students, eventually assumed direction of the school as his health declined in the early 2000s.

=== Grupo de Bailado do Porto ===
In 1974 Treku founded the Grupo de Bailado do Porto, a semi-professional ensemble intended to give performance opportunities to his advanced students and other local dancers at a time when most professional ballet activity in Portugal was concentrated in Lisbon. The group – often described as a forerunner of the Companhia de Bailado do Porto – toured regionally and presented a mixed repertory of classical and contemporary works through the 1970s and 1980s.

Under Treku's artistic direction, the company staged full-length or abridged productions of The Nutcracker (O Quebra-Nozes), Coppélia, Les Sylphides, Giselle and Swan Lake, often with the assistance of guest choreographers and répétiteurs from abroad. Treku also created original works for the Porto ensemble, including Foz 1900, Concerto de Aranjuez, Amanhecer and Noite, and choreographed dance scenes for opera productions such as La traviata, Orfeo ed Euridice and Dido and Aeneas. The group remained active into the early 1990s, after which its activities diminished as national institutions such as the CNB consolidated their presence.

== Later years and death ==
In 1991 Treku underwent a heart transplant but continued to teach and to supervise his school's activities for many years afterwards. Around 2003 he returned more permanently to Zarautz, although he maintained close ties with Porto and with the academy that bore his name.

Shortly before his death, the Casa de la Danza in Logroño (Spain) named him an Amigo de Honor (“Honorary Friend”) in recognition of his long career in dance. Treku died of heart failure in San Sebastián (Donostia) on 13 July 2006, aged 76, after complications related to an infection; Basque and Spanish sources record San Sebastián as the place and 13 July as the date of death, although one English obituary erroneously reported 12 July in Madrid.

== Legacy ==
Treku's influence is visible in the generations of dancers trained at his Porto academy. Notable alumni include Luísa Taveira, a former principal dancer and later artistic director of the Companhia Nacional de Bailado; as well as dancers who worked with Ballet Gulbenkian, CNB and companies in Germany and Italy. Former students and colleagues often emphasised both the discipline and the human warmth of his teaching, describing him as “Basque to the core” yet an “English gentleman” in bearing, shaped by his years in London.

After his death, his school and the city of Porto organised tribute events. On 15 May 2007 the Casa da Música hosted the gala Obrigada, Pirmin Treku, featuring around 120 students and guest artists and including archival film of his performances. In 2012 the Photomuseum in Zarautz mounted the exhibition Bizitza dantzan, dantza bizitza (“Life dancing, dance life”), displaying photographs, programmes and documents from his career as a dancer and teacher.

The Academia de Bailado Clássico Pirmin Treku continues to operate in Porto, celebrating “decades of passion for dance” and maintaining the classical training tradition he established. In the Basque Country, retrospective articles and exhibitions have presented him as a “lost son” whose international career unfolded largely abroad but whose story forms part of the wider history of the Basque war children.

== Name ==
Treku's birth name was Fermín Aldabaldetreku Arruti. During his years in Britain, he was professionally credited as Pirmin Trecu, a shortened stage name adopted for ease of pronunciation. After settling in Portugal and reconnecting with Basque cultural circles, the spelling “Treku” became standard, and his school and later tributes generally use this Basque form.
