= Mikenskaya shooting =

1999 mass shooting in Chechnya

- Mikenskaya (Chechnya)
- Location: 43.6673°N 45.3822°E; Mikenskaya, Chechnya
- Date: 8 October 1999; 27 years ago
- Target: Russians
- Attack type: Mass murder, mass shooting
- Weapon: Kalashnikov rifle
- Deaths: 35+ (including the perpetrator)
- Injuries: 20+
- Perpetrator: Achmed Ibragimov
- Motive: Russophobia (alleged)

The Mikenskaya shooting was a mass murder committed during the Second Chechen War, where at least 34 Russian inhabitants of the village Mikenskaya were killed by Achmed Ibragimov, a Chechen, on 8 October 1999. Ibragimov escaped the village but was captured two days later and handed over to relatives of his victims, who publicly lynched him in the village square. The attack resulted in the majority of ethnic Russian families in Mikenskaya leaving the village. It was the deadliest mass shooting by a lone gunman in Russia's modern history.

== Massacre ==
On 8 October, a battle between Chechen government rebels and the Russian Army occurred in the Mikenskaya area. After the battle had ceased, people came out of their hiding places, and Ibragimov first approached a group of people sitting on a bench, and after briefly talking with them he took out a Kalashnikov rifle and shot four of them. Ibragimov, who was reportedly drunk, then went through the village and shot those whom he recognized as being Russians, while sparing those who were Chechens. After taking a bicycle from one of his victims, he methodically rode to houses occupied by Russians, called out their inhabitants, and shot them. Whenever he wounded his victims, he would kill them by shooting them again in the head.

The victims were left lying in the streets, in yards, and in their homes. In less than an hour, Ibragimov had killed at least 34 Russian inhabitants of the village, aged from 10 to 89 years. He fled when he ran out of ammunition, though two days later, he was captured by Chechen rebels and handed over to the village elders. Without going through a trial, he was handcuffed to a pole at the village square, where he was beaten to death with iron rods by two Russian brothers whose parents he had killed. Ibragimov's corpse was then left lying in the street since the local mullahs forbade to bury him.

== Perpetrator ==
Ahmed Ibragimov (Russian: Ахмед Ибрагимов) was born in 1956, and was a native of Mikenskaya, Chechnya, a village about 30 miles northwest of Grozny. During the privatization after the collapse of the Soviet Union in the early 90s, he acquired some farm machinery and worked as a driver, later on running a small shop, and at one point was also the local postman. Ibragimov had a brother who was killed in the First Chechen War, and at the time of the killings he was living in Chernokozovo. In August 1999, the Second Chechen War began, and on 1 October the Russian Federation invaded Chechnya as part of the conflict.

The reason for the shooting apparently was the villagers' refusal to dig trenches, and actions of the Russian forces. Ibragimov, according to one villager, stated that "Russians are killing Chechens, so now I am going to kill Russians." Various higher death tolls have been reported, ranging from 35 (34 Russians and a Meskhetian Turk), and 39, to up to 41, and it was also reported that he had shot 42 Russians and five Chechens.

Ibragimov reportedly had already killed several members of a family named Allenov in another village called Alpatovo a few days prior, though this claim may be erroneously referring to a previous massacre committed by Chechen militants in that same village.

=== Victims ===
==== Individuals ====
Furthermore, the following persons were killed:

- Peter Atarshikov (Петр Атарщиков)
- Zoya Filippovna Andriyenko (Зоя Филипповна Андриенко) - Teacher at a local school.
- Victor Kakezov (Виктор Какезов)
- Mariya Ivanovna Maslova (Мария Ивановна Маслова)
- Ekaterina Ivanovna Pyltsina (Екатерина Ивановна Пыльцина) - Secretary for the village council.
- Dmitri Radchenko (Дмитрий Радченко)
- Mrs. Tatarenko (Татаренко) and her two sons, one of whom, Kolya Tatarenko, was 10 years old.

==== Families ====
Among those killed were up to four members of the following families:

- Drobilov (Дробилов)
- Radchenko (Радченко)
- Fedosov (Федосов)
- Pletnev (Плетнев)

== Aftermath ==
On 21 December 1999, Chechen President Aslan Maskhadov was summoned by the North Caucasus branch of the Russian General Prosecutor's Office to be questioned about the shooting and other atrocities that had occurred in Chechnya since 1991. The bodies of Ibragimov's victims were exhumed by Russian investigators, who were trying to examine the circumstances of the shooting. The shooting resulted in the majority of ethnic Russian families in Mikenskaya leaving.

== See also ==
- List of rampage killers (religious, political, or ethnic crimes)
