= Eden Natan-Zada =

Israeli soldier and mass-murderer (1986–2005)

- עדן נתן-זדה
- Eden Natan-Zada
- Born: 9 July 1986; Israel
- Died: 4 August 2005 (aged 19); Shefa-Amr, Israel
- Cause of death: Lynching

Details
- Date: 4 August 2005; 21 years ago
- Locations: Shefa-Amr, Israel
- Killed: 4
- Injured: 12
- Weapon: M16 rifle

Eden Natan-Zada (Hebrew: עדן נתן-זדה; 9 July 1986 – 4 August 2005) was an Israeli deserter who opened fire in a bus in Shefa-Amr in northern Israel on 4 August 2005, killing four Arab citizens of Israel and wounding twelve others. He was restrained, disarmed and cuffed when he tried to reload to prepare for another round of shooting. After he was restrained and handcuffed, he was beaten to death by the crowd, as recorded on video. It has been inferred that the shooting was a personal protest against the Israeli government's disengagement plan, since an orange ribbon was found attached to Natan-Zada's pocket (orange was an emblem color of anti-disengagement activism). Natan-Zada was absent without leave and in hiding from the IDF at the time of the shooting.

== Early life ==
Natan-Zada was born to an Israeli Jewish family that had immigrated to Israel from Iran and Yemen. Natan-Zada's parents describe him as having been a "bright and studious Israeli schoolboy" prior to his becoming involved with the Jewish extremist Kahanism movement, to which he was introduced via the Internet. He then began spending weekends in Kfar Tapuach, an Orthodox West Bank settlement. During his national service in the Israel Defense Forces (IDF), Natan-Zada deserted the army and hid in Kfar Tapuach to avoid further service. According to Matthew Gutman of The Jerusalem Post, Kfar Tapuach "became the unofficial headquarters of the Jewish terrorist group Kahane Chai in 1990," but supporters deny the existence of a Kahane headquarters.

In a letter left behind after his desertion, Natan-Zada expressed dismay to his parents over the disengagement plan, saying "Just as I couldn't carry out an order that desecrates the Sabbath, I cannot be part of an organization that expels Jews." He added the anti-pullout slogan "Jews don't expel Jews" to his letter, and concluded the message with the words: "I will consider how I will continue to serve."

His mother claims that prior to the shooting she alerted the IDF and other security services that her son was still in possession of his military-issued weapon. "We told everyone he's AWOL, that he could do something with his gun. We begged them to take away his gun. He also asked them to take his gun. The army destroyed my child. The army destroyed my life." According to The New Republic, an army psychiatrist warned that he wasn't fit for weapons or uniform, but his professional judgment was awaiting approval by a panel of medical experts. A "former chief of staff of the IDF" had reportedly "speculated that the killer's parents might have a chance to win damages in court for neglect by the army of the welfare of their son."

In April 2005, Natan-Zada was arrested during a Kach protest at the Temple Mount in Jerusalem.

== Shefa-Amr attack ==
2005 Shefa-Amr attack
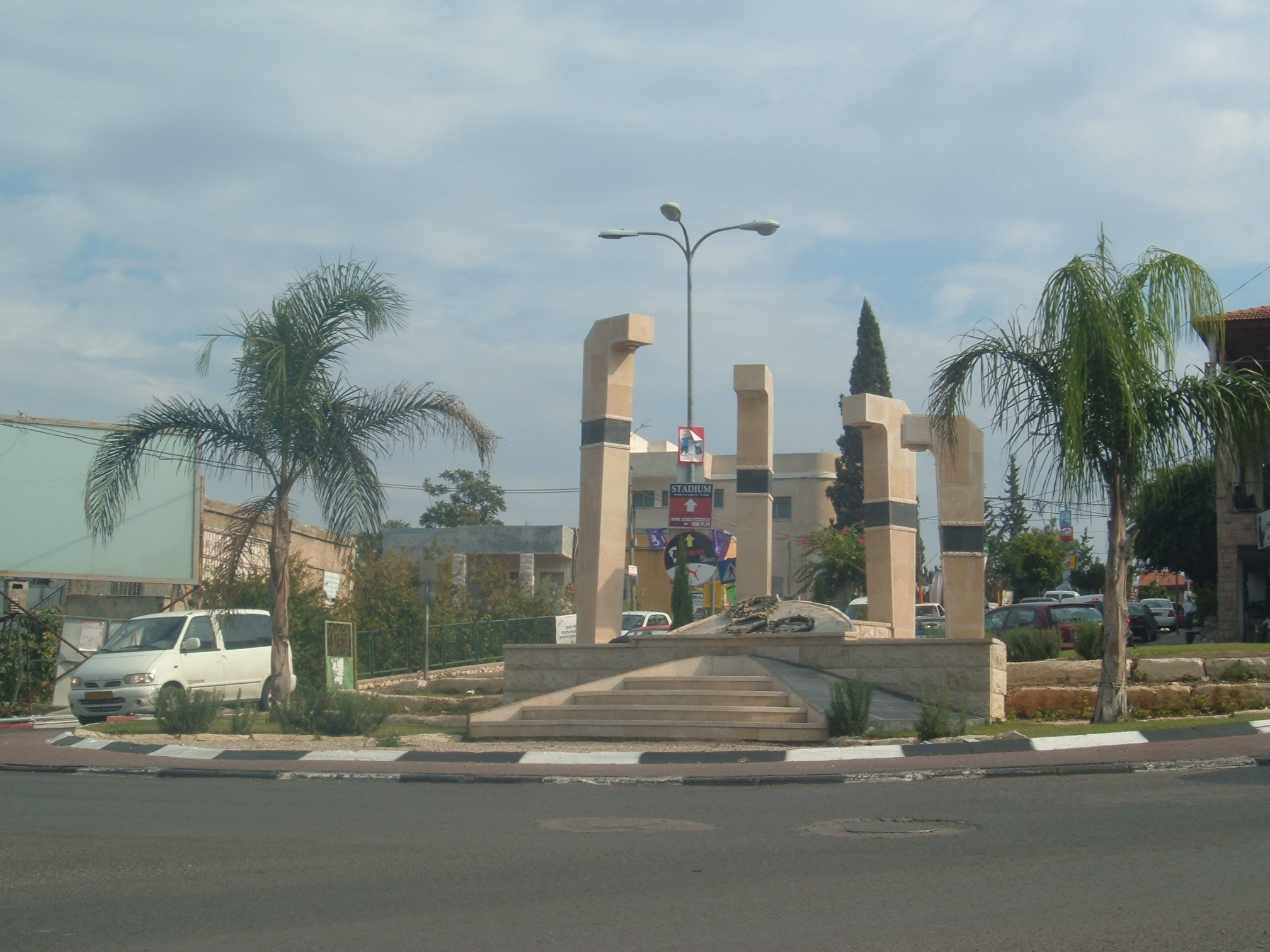
- the memorial to the victims of the 2005 Shefa-Amr attack
- Location: Shefa-Amr, Israel
- Date: 4 August 2005
- Attack type: Shooting attack
- Deaths: 5 (including the perpetrator)
- Injuries: 12
- Perpetrator: Eden Natan-Zada

Natan-Zada boarded the Shefa-'Amr-bound bus on Thursday, 4 August 2005. He was dressed in full IDF uniform, carrying his IDF-issued M16 rifle, and, according to observers, wearing the skullcap, beard, and sidelocks of an observant Jew, as well as an orange ribbon hanging from his pocket. According to witnesses, the bus driver was initially surprised to see a religiously observant Jewish soldier making his way to Shefa-'Amr (an overwhelmingly Arab city) via public bus, so he asked Natan-Zada if he was certain he wanted to take his current route. Upon arriving in Shefa-'Amr's primary Druze neighborhood, Natan-Zada stood up and approached the front door as if to disembark the bus. When the door opened, Natan-Zada turned around and shot the driver. He then fatally shot a man sitting behind the driver, and fired into the rest of the bus, killing two young women and wounding twenty-one passengers. When he paused to reload his weapon, a passenger grabbed the barrel of his gun, sustaining burn injuries, and he was subdued by streetgoers gathered around the scene of the bus shooting. When the police arrived at the scene he was tied up but still alive, but the small force of police officers on the scene could not prevent the crowd from lynching him, and nine police officers were injured attempting to protect him. It took the police four hours to remove his body from the scene.

The four victims were Hazar Turki and Dina Turki, two sisters in their early twenties, and two men, Michel Bahus (the driver) and Nader Hayek; all were Arab citizens of Israel. The wounded were rushed to Rambam Medical Center in Haifa. In the days after the attack, 40,000 people attended a funeral service in honor of the victims in the town. The two sisters were buried in an Islamic cemetery, and the two men in the local Christian cemetery.

=== Claim that authorities were aware of Natan-Zada's intentions ===
In March 2010, a lawyer representing some of the lynch suspects discovered security forces aerial footage of the scene prior to, during and after Natan-Zada's attack and after the lynching of Natan-Zada and accused the Israeli government of prior knowledge of Natan-Zada's intentions. At the time, the police denied it had aerial support and some have claimed a conspiracy theory that the government was trying to delegitimize the anti-disengagement movement by provoking an extremist act or setting up Natan-Zada.

== Reactions ==
Then Prime Minister of Israel Ariel Sharon condemned Natan-Zada's actions unequivocally, calling them "a reprehensible act by a bloodthirsty Jewish terrorist," and "a deliberate attempt to harm the fabric of relations among all Israeli citizens." Vice Premier Shimon Peres and Interior Minister Ophir Pines-Paz visited the bereaved families. "Your pain is the pain of the entire State of Israel. We will not allow crazy men and terrorists to harm your life here," Peres told the families. Sharon's government consistently referred to the shooting as "an act of terrorism," language usually reserved for Palestinian suicide bombers.

== Investigation and trial ==
The Israel Police opened a criminal investigation into Zada's lynching.

The High Follow-Up Committee for Arab Citizens of Israel called on the government to refrain from investigating the death of Eden Natan-Zada. Arab Knesset member Mohammad Barakeh, a Shefa-'Amr resident himself, warned that protests could erupt if police probe Zada's lynching: "Normally when someone stops a terrorist from continuing to kill he is considered a hero, but in this case it is the heroes who are sitting on the defense stand". However, Shefa-'Amr's security officer, Jamal Aliam, told Army Radio that Zada had been attacked by dozens of people after he had been handcuffed and subdued by police.

Eventually, on 13 June 2006, five suspects in the lynching were arrested, one who was already serving a prison sentence was brought in for questioning, and a seventh suspect turned himself in after learning he was wanted by police. The police said: "We're responsible for maintaining the law, and you can't take the law into your own hands even when it concerns a terrorist who murdered innocent people, even though he made a heinous terrorist act". Two suspects were subsequently released. There was general support for their arrest and even left-wing activist Yossi Beilin said: "Israel can't put up with a lynch made on a handcuffed person even if his actions are heinous and unforgivable. It's a combined interest of both Jews and Arabs that Israel won't close its eyes to such behaviour". The Arab Knesset members however demanded their release and called their arrest a crime.

On 7 June 2009, twelve Arab citizens were indicted over the lynching in the Haifa District Court. Seven were charged with attempted murder. In March 2010, Maher Talhami, their defense lawyer, stated that recently discovered aerial footage of the bus, recorded by an Israeli drone before, during and after the attack took place indicates that Israeli defense officials were aware of Natan-Zada's intentions.

In July 2013, the seven defendants charged with attempted murder were acquitted of that charge, but four were convicted of attempted manslaughter and two were convicted of aggravated battery, while one was exonerated entirely. The sentencing took place on 28 November 2013. Three were sentenced to two years in prison, while one was sentenced to 20 months, one to 18 months, and one to 11 months.

== Burial controversy ==
Natan-Zada's funeral was a controversial matter. Jewish law requires a swift burial, but nationwide outrage against his attacks left his body without a willing resting place for two days.

An initial agreement between IDF officials and the Natan-Zada family would have allowed burial in a military cemetery, but with no military honors such as a 21-gun salute or placement of the Israeli flag upon his coffin. However, Meir Nitzan, the mayor of Rishon LeZion, intervened before the funeral. The morgue which housed Natan-Zada's body, Abu Kabir Forensic Institute, refused to release the body to friends and fellow Kahane activists to bury, resulting in a bitter protest.

Residents of Kfar Tapuach were divided on the issue. Kfar Tapuach resident Moshe Meirsdorf said Natan-Zada's connection to the community "has been destructive for us. We totally reject everything he did." Meirsdorf claimed that Natan-Zada and other extremist youth were not official community members, despite the fact that Natan-Zada had legally updated his address to Kfar Tapuach. "He was never accepted by the absorption committee," said Meirsdorf, whose wife is a member of the committee. Others supported Natan-Zada, including four teenagers from Tapuach who were arrested following the incident. Most locals, however, voiced opinions in line with Tapuach leader David Haivri, who expressed pain over the loss of Natan-Zada and emphasized the tragedy of his death.

Some Israeli media outlets initially suggested that Natan-Zada be buried in the West Bank settlement of Kiryat Arba, where Baruch Goldstein, who committed the Cave of the Patriarchs massacre 11 years earlier, is buried. Natan-Zada's body resided for two days in the Abu-Kabir morgue, pending an appeal to Prime Minister Sharon by his parents. On 7 August 2005, the Prime Minister's Bureau overruled Meir Nitzan's ban against burial in Rishon LeZion, and decreed that Zada should be buried in the civilian cemetery there. He was buried in the Gordon neighborhood. Because of the delays, Natan-Zada was buried two days after Jewish law allows. Three of the hundreds of mourners at the burial were arrested with administrative arrest orders, including "New Kach" leader Efraim Hershkovits, American citizen Saadia Herskof, and former Kach activist Tiran Pollack's son Gilad.

== Victim compensation ==
After the event, the Israeli Defense Ministry, then under the leadership of Shaul Mofaz, ruled that the four Arab citizens shot dead were not victims of terror because their killer was not part of a terrorist organization, and are thus not entitled to the usual compensation for life lost due to terror attacks. According to Mayan Malkin, a spokeswoman with the Israeli Defense Ministry, an attacker must be a member of the "enemy forces" against Israel to be considered a terrorist under the law. Instead, they received payment "beyond the letter of the law," as a lump-sum payment, as opposed to the lifelong monthly annuity given to the families of terror victims. Representatives of the Arab community in Israel condemned the decision, with Mohammed Barakeh, an Arab member of the Israeli parliament, saying that the "…decision raises a strong scent of racism, which distinguishes between a Jewish terrorist and an Arab terrorist." On 19 July 2006, the Israeli government, under the administration of Ehud Olmert, changed the "Compensation Law for Victims of Hostile Acts" to include anyone victimized by violence stemming from the Israeli-Arab conflict. As a result of this change, the victims and families of Natan-Zada became eligible for terror compensation.

== See also ==
- Mohammad Barakeh
- 2005 Shilo shooting
