= Zarautz =

- Municipality
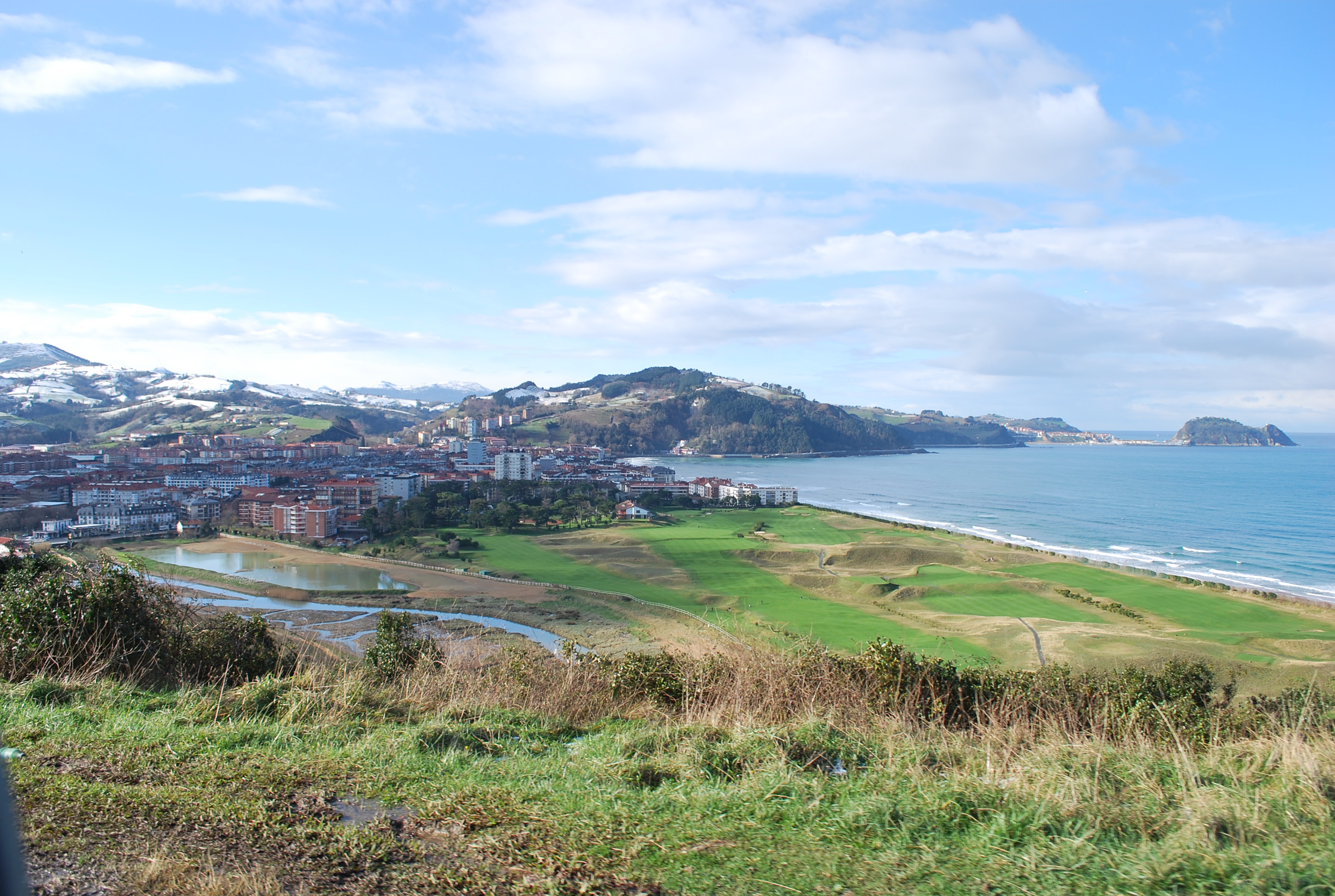
- Zarautz

- Coat of arms

- Location in Spain Zarautz (Spain)
- Coordinates: 43°17′11″N 2°10′29″W
- Country: Spain
- Autonomous Community: Basque Country
- Province: Gipuzkoa
- Eskualdea: Urola Kosta

Government
  - Mayor: Xabier Txurruka Fernández (EAJ-PNV)

Area
  - Total: 14.8 km^{2} (5.7 sq mi)
- Elevation (AMSL): 4 m (13 ft)

Population (2025-01-01)
  - Total: 23,496
  - Density: 1,590/km^{2} (4,110/sq mi)
- Time zone: UTC+1 (CET)
  - Summer (DST): UTC+2 (CEST (GMT +2))
- Postal code: 20800
- Area code: +34 (Spain) + 943 (Gipuzkoa)
- Website: Official website

Zarautz (Basque: [s̻aɾaut͡s̻], Spanish: Zarauz) is a coastal town located in central Gipuzkoa, Basque Country, in Spain. It is bordered by Aia to the east and the south and Getaria to the west, located about 15 kilometres (9.3 mi) west of Donostia/San Sebastián. It has four enclaves limiting the aforementioned municipalities: Alkortiaga, Ekano, Sola, and Arbestain. As of 2014, Zarautz has a population of 22,890, which usually swells to about 60,000 in the summer.

The Palace of Narros, located adjacent to Zarautz's 2.8 km (1.7 mi) long beach, is where Queen Isabella II and Fabiola of Belgium once spent their summer holidays. The beach is known for being the longest in the Basque Country and one of longest of the Cantabrian cornice.

The Mayor of Zarautz since 2015 has been Xabier Txurruka (Basque Nationalist Party).

== History ==
- 1237: The site is founded as a town and its Navarrese charters confirmed by king Fernando III of Castile.
- 1857: The beginning of the Industrial Revolution in Zarautz, thanks to the enterprise "Fabril Linera". An era of economic growth and development begins.
- 1936: The Civil War begins and Zarautz overwhelmingly supports the Republican cause.
- 1936: The province falls to Falangist forces in the Spanish Civil War, who carry out reprisals against the Basque nationalists.

At the end of the 19th century, and the beginning of the 20th century, the popularity of Zarautz as a luxury tourist destination grew, and many well-known people began to holiday there: Umberto II of Italy, Marlene Dietrich, Jackie Kennedy... A number of lavish houses and mansions sprang up, particularly along the beach. Nowadays, many of these buildings have become public buildings or have been demolished and replaced by chic apartment buildings.

During the 1970s and 1980s, Zarautz became a more affordable destination, and is now perhaps best known for its surfing and water sports.

== Infrastructure and transport ==
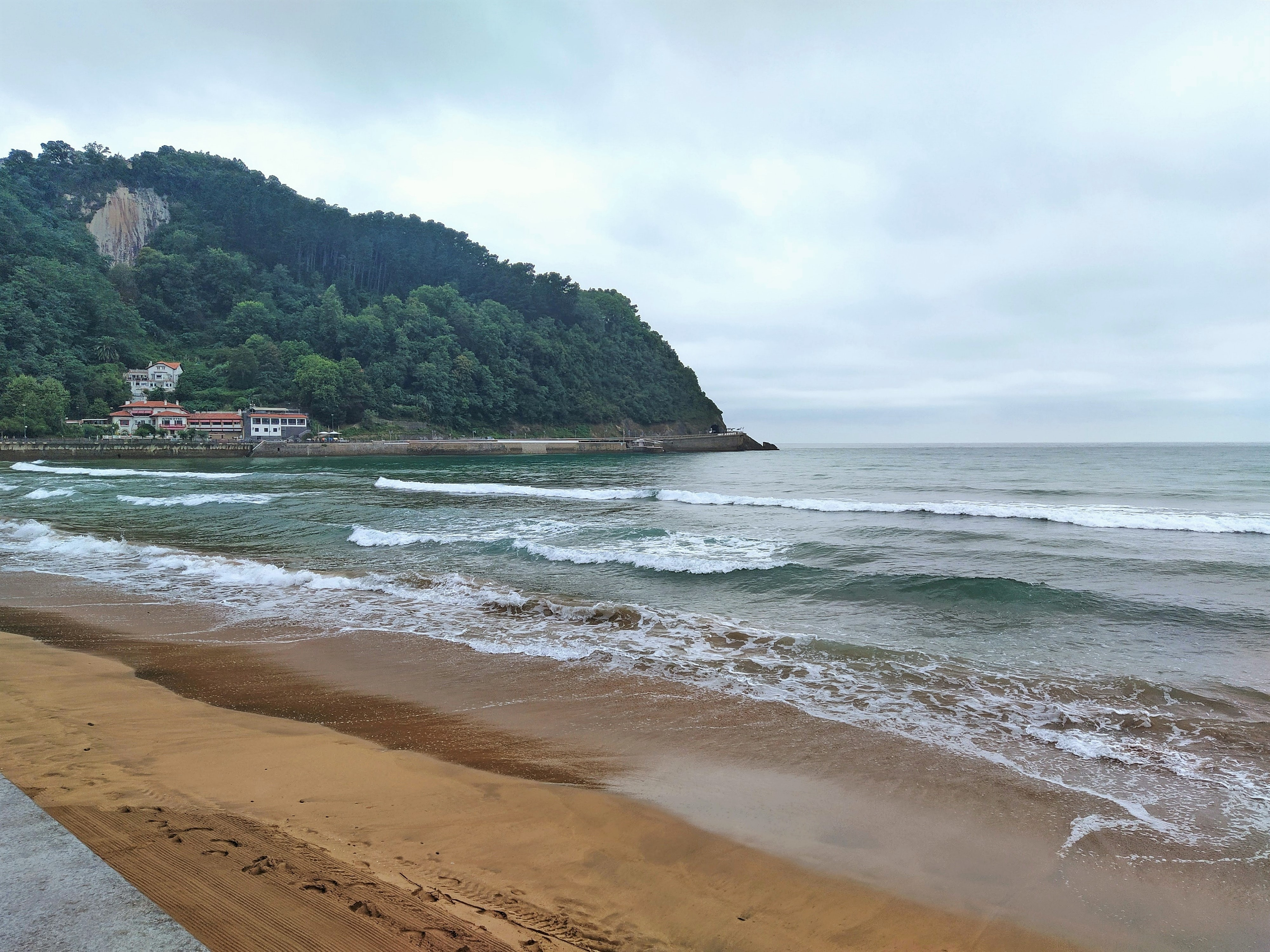
Zarautz beach

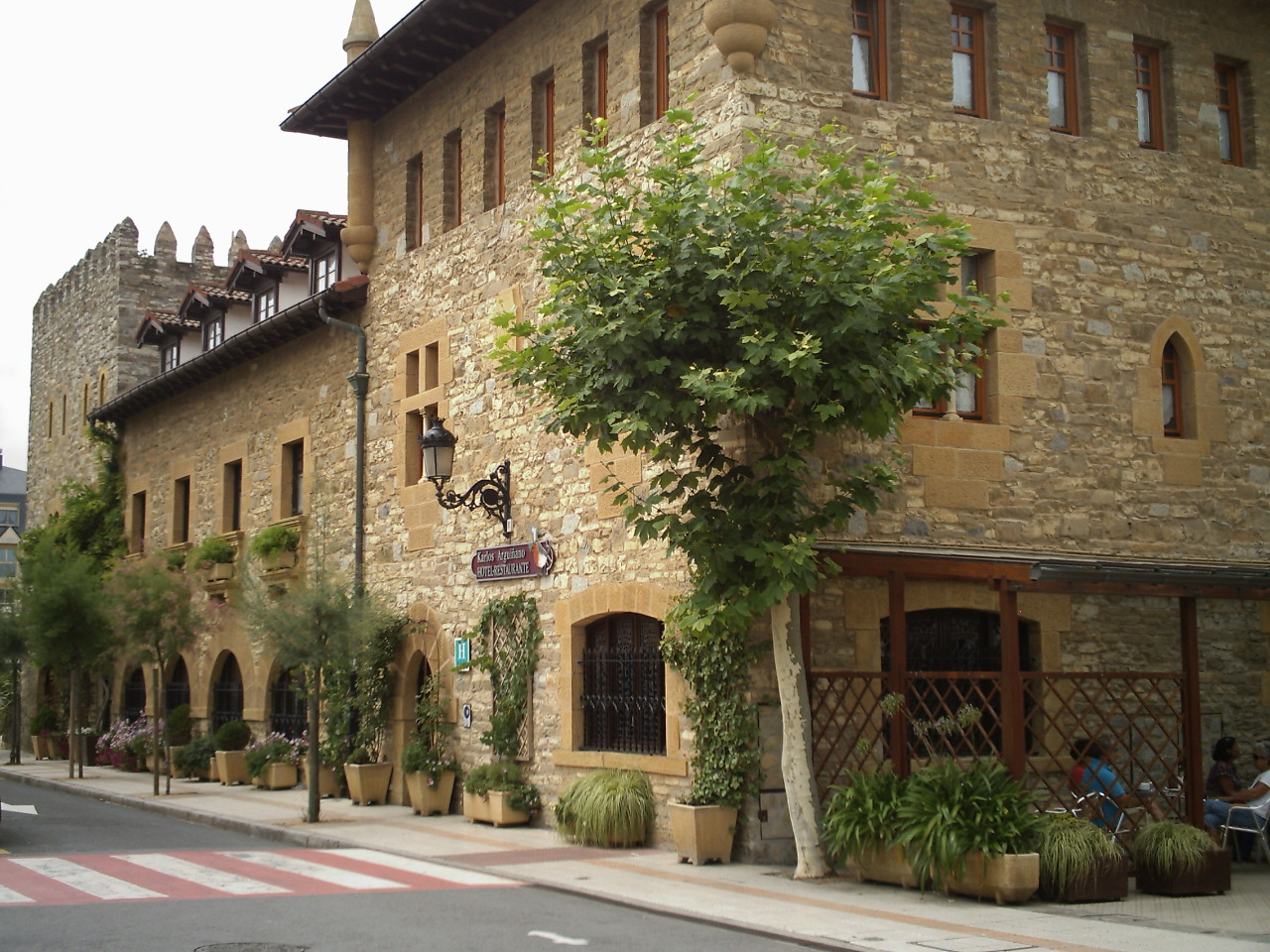
Karlos Arguiñano's hotel-restaurant

=== Road ===
Zarautz is connected to the European road network and to the rest of Spain by the A8 motorway.

=== Gastronomy ===
As it is tradition in the Basque Country, gastronomy is a very important part of Zarautz. Many restaurants can be found in Zarautz, offering traditional as well as modern fine cuisine. Zarautz is home town of one of the most famous cooks in Spain, Karlos Arguiñano, whose hotel and restaurant can be found right in front of the beach. He also created a prestigious cooking school called Aiala. As in all cities around The Basque Country, there are a lot of gastronomical societies in Zarautz. They are very traditional and called Txoko in Basque.

=== Public transport ===
Zarautz has two railway stations, and trains (Euskotren Trena) connect it with San Sebastian and Bilbao.

Zarautz has two bus lines operating within the town.

=== Museums ===
There are two museums in Zarautz, the Photomuseum and the Art and History Museum of Zarautz. In "Dorre Luzea" there are frequent art exhibitions. The town also has many other picture galleries.

=== Churches ===
There are three main churches in Zarautz and many other smaller churches. Santa Maria la Real is the main church, with a very interesting altar piece and a Romanesque structure. Santa Clara is also quite interesting, built in a baroque style. Finally, Franciscanos church, which has been virtually rebuilt, features a very interesting library.

== Recreation ==
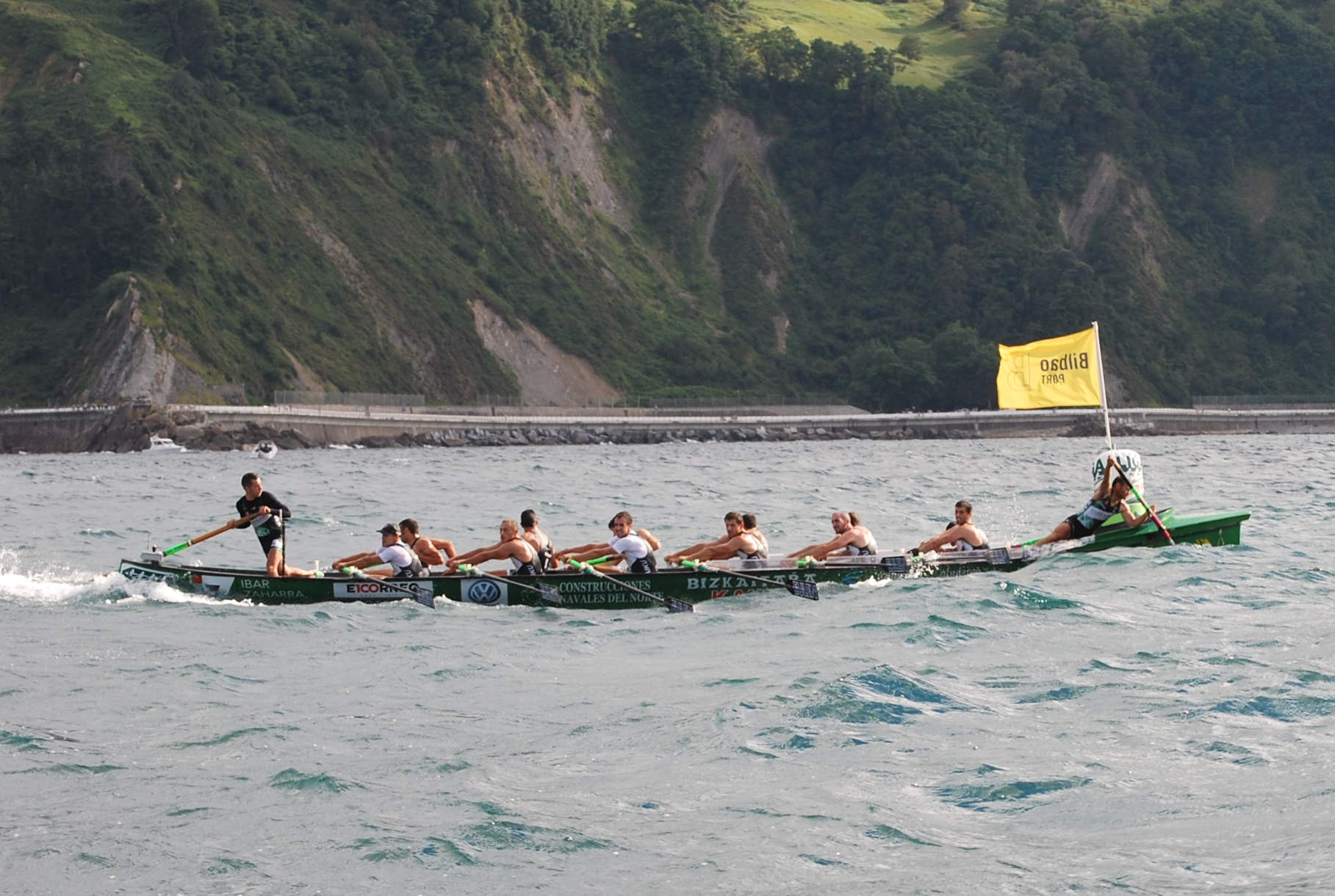
Rowing competition in Zarautz

Zarautz has sporting facilities, such as an old Golf Club. But Zarautz is also known as a surfing destination. Over the last few years, it has become popular among surfers, and even a number of surfing schools have been established (Zarautz, Pukas).

== Sport ==
Zarautz is the birthplace of the Basque Weightlifting Federation as well as the Gipuzkoa Weightlifting Federation. Since 1968 weightlifting (ZKEhalterofilia) has been one of the sports that can be practiced at the local sports club (Zarautz Kirol Elkartea). Since then, every summer an international weightlifting event has taken place in the town. At first, very famous athletes took part in that competition such as Serge Reding and Alain Terme to name a few. In recent times, the event has become a club competition in which the French champion Girondins de Bordeaux has won most of the top prizes.

Zarautz is a prominent surfing destination in Spain, featuring a 2.5 km (1.6 mi) beach with multiple peaks suitable for various skill levels. The town has produced several Spanish surfing champions and serves as a host venue for the World Surf League Qualifying Series.

== Twin towns and sister cities ==
- Cardano al Campo, Italy
- Pontarlier, France
- El Hagounia, Morocco

== Notable people ==
- Pirmin Treku (1930–2006), ballet dancer, teacher and choreographer

== See also ==
- 1980 Zarautz attack, an ETA attack which killed five people in the town.
