= IDF outpost bombing attack (December 2004) =

Attack on the border checkpoint in Rafah

2004 IDF outpost bombing attack
- Part of the Second Intifada militancy campaign
- The attack site marked with a red dot.
- Location: IDF outpost near the Philadelphi Route, Southern District, Israel
- Date: 12 December 2004
- Attack type: Bombing attack, Shooting attack
- Deaths: 5 IDF soldiers (+ 2 attackers)
- Injuries: 6 IDF soldiers
- Perpetrators: Hamas and Fatah claimed joint responsibility

The 2004 IDF outpost bombing attack was an integrated attack carried out on 12 December 2004 by a Palestinian militant squad of the Izz al-Din al-Qassam military wing of Hamas and the Fatah Hawks (a military wing of Fatah) at an Israel Defense Forces outpost located on the border between the Gaza Strip and Egypt.

Five Bedouin IDF soldiers from the Desert Patrol Battalion were killed in the attack and six others were injured, and the outpost was destroyed. Two Palestinian militants were also killed during the attack.

== Preparations for the attack ==
Long before the attack occurred, Palestinian militants drilled an 800 m (2,600 ft) long tunnel which began from a hidden location within Palestinian homes located near the security fence between the Gaza Strip and Egypt. From there the tunnel went under the border fence and reached a small Israeli military outpost located between the Gaza Strip and Egypt. The militants planted 1.5 metric tons of explosives directly below the outpost.

== The attack ==
On Sunday, 12 December 2004, at about 17:45 pm, the militants detonated two powerful explosions in two different locations, within a few minutes of each other. These explosions caused extensive damage and injured 11 soldiers.

Immediately after the explosions, two Palestinian militants stormed the outpost and began opening fire at the Israeli soldiers stationed at the outpost. The attackers managed to kill two IDF soldiers before they were killed themselves.

Rescue Forces were summoned to the site assisted by helicopters, whom attempted to rescue the wounded. At this point a third explosion occurred within the outpost, which was an apparent attempt to get casualties among the rescue forces although it didn't cause any casualties or injuries.

Due to the continuous heavy barrage of mortar fire, the IDF rescue forces were only able to rescue the injured after a long while.

Five Bedouin IDF soldiers from the Desert Patrol Battalion were killed in the attack and six others were injured. Total destruction was caused to the outpost in the attack.

=== Victims ===
- Sergeant Adham Shehadeh, 20, from Tur'an
- Sergeant Sa'id Jahaja, 19, from Ar'arat an-Naqab
- Sergeant Aref Azbargah, 20, from Kuseife
- Sergeant Tareq al-Ziadna, 20, from Rahat
- Sergeant Hussein Abu Leil, 23, from Ein Mahil

== The perpetrators ==
Hamas and Fatah claimed joint responsibility for the attack.

== Israel's reaction ==
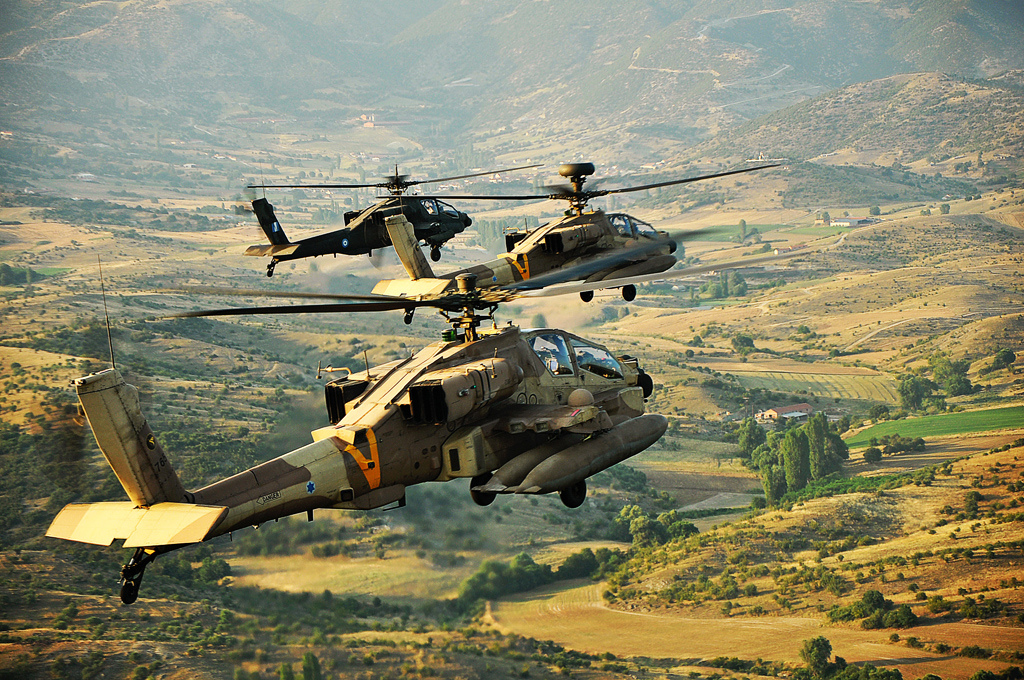
Three Israeli Apache helicopters flying over Greece during a joint military exercise.

Following the attack, the IAF (Israel Air Force) sent two Apache attack helicopters fired "at least six" missiles into Gaza city. The IAF targeted at least two buildings used by terrorists to manufacture weapons.
