= Aracruz =

Aracruz may refer to:

- Aracruz Celulose, a Brazilian manufacturer of pulp and paper
- Aracruz, Espírito Santo, a municipality in the state of Espírito Santo, Brazil
