= 2005 Shilo shooting =

Murder of four Palestinians

- Part of the Israeli disengagement from the Gaza Strip
- Location: Near Shilo, West Bank
- Date: 17 August 2005; After 5:00 P.M. (UTC+02:00)
- Target: Palestinians
- Weapon: M16 rifle
- Deaths: 4
- Perpetrator: Asher Weisgan
- Motive: Disruption of the Israeli disengagement

The 2005 Shilo shooting was the murder of four Palestinian laborers in the West Bank on 17 August 2005. Israeli driver Asher Weisgan killed the men in an effort to derail the Israeli disengagement from the Gaza Strip.

== Shooting ==
Asher Weisgan (born 1967/1968) was a resident of Shvut Rachel and a driver for Palestinian laborers near the West Bank Israeli settlement of Shilo, Mateh Binyamin. On 17 August 2005, sometime after 5:00 P.M., Weisgan used a knife to steal a security guard's M16 rifle, and then killed four Palestinians before turning himself in to security. Weisgan was well-acquainted with the men, having known and eaten with them for years.

The fatalities of the shooting were Mohammed Mansour (aged 48) and Bassam Tauase (aged 30), both from Nablus; Halil Salah (aged 42) from Qalqilya; and Osama Moussa Tawafsha (aged 33) from Sanjil. Another man, Ruhi Qassam, was only wounded by Weisgan.

Saying he had no regrets about his actions, Weisgan had wanted to spur an Arab reprisal, thereby engaging the Israel Defense Forces, and preventing the further removal of Israelis from their homes in the Gaza Strip and northern West Bank (as part of the Israeli disengagement from the Gaza Strip).

== Trial ==
Weisgan was convicted of murder.

On 27 September 2006, Weisgan was sentenced by the Jerusalem District Court to pay restitution of US$236,000 (equivalent to $376,907 in 2025), and to four back-to-back life sentences plus twelve years. According to Israeli human rights groups, convictions were rare for Israelis who commit crimes in the West Bank. Imprisoned in Ayalon Prison, Weisgan died from suicide by hanging in his cell on 22 December 2006.

== See also ==
- Eden Natan-Zada – Israeli soldier and mass-murderer (1986–2005)
