= 1980 Zarautz attack =

Mass shooting by ETA in Gipuzkoa, Spain

- Part of the Basque conflict
- Location: 43.28663°N 2.175213°W; Zarautz, Spain
- Date: 3 November 1980; 23:50 (UTC+1)
- Target: off-duty civil guards
- Attack type: Mass shooting, firearm attack
- Deaths: 5
- Injuries: 5
- Perpetrator: ETA
- No. of participants: 6

The 1980 Zarautz attack was a mass shooting gun attack by the Basque separatist organisation ETA which occurred on 3 November 1980 in the Basque town of Zarautz in Gipuzkoa. The targets were several off duty civil guards belonging to the traffic department, who were drinking in a bar in the town. The attack was the second deadliest of 1980, the year when ETA killed more people than any other.

== Background ==
Three previous ETA attacks in the town had resulted in fatalities. On 18 October 1975, a civil guard was killed. He was the last person to be killed by ETA during the dictatorship of Francisco Franco. ETA attacks had also resulted in one fatality on 5 July 1978 and 16 May 1980.

The attacks came a day after protests, organised by the main political parties in the Basque country, had seen 15,000 people turn out "against terrorism and for peace." The rallies had been organised following an increase in political violence, particularly the killing of the university professor Juan de Dios Doval, a member of the local executive committee of the Union of the Democratic Centre (at that time the governing party of Spain.)

== The attack ==
According to testimonies at the subsequent trial of an ETA member, an ETA commando unit had spent October watching the comings and goings of civil guards at the Aizea bar in Zarautz.

The attack occurred just before midnight. Five off duty civil guards, belonging to the local traffic department, were drinking in the Aizea bar, along with at least 20 other people. Shortly before midnight, two individuals, armed with machine guns, entered the bar. After shouting slogans in support of ETA such as "Gora ETA" they sprayed the civil guards with bullets. The attack was rapid, lasting less than ten seconds. Four of the civil guards were killed, with the other injured. Two waiters and another three customers were injured in the attack. One of the customers died the following morning, having been hit in the head and throat by bullets. The ETA members then escaped in a Renault 18, driven by an accomplice. Another three ETA members were involved in the attack, helping the participants to escape.

== Reactions ==
In response to the attack, 3000 protested against ETA violence the following day, while the local council passed a motion condemning the attack. The two councillors of Herri Batasuna, the party closest to ETA, abstained. However, both condemned the attack in a personal capacity and one of them quit the party in protest.

== Trials and convictions ==
On 17 March 1988, Juan María Tapia Irujo was sentenced to 66 years in prison for participation in the attack. Tapia's testimony resulted in José Javier Zabaleta Elosegi, alias “Baldo”, being sentenced to 200 years in prison for participation in and authorship of the attacks. An appeal filed against Baldo's sentence was rejected in 2003.
