= 2002 attack on American cultural centre in Kolkata =

Islamic terrorist attack in India

Coordinates: 22.5512931°N 88.3493367°E

- Location of West Bengal in India
- Location: Kolkata, Kolkata district, West Bengal, India
- Date: 22 January 2002
- Deaths: 5
- Injuries: 20
- Perpetrator: Harkat-ul-Jihad al-Islami (Claimed Responsibility)

Four police constables and a private security guard of US Marine were killed and 20 other people injured when, on 22 January 2002, Islamic militants attacked an American cultural centre in Kolkata, India. The centre houses a library and the American consulate's public affairs section, which includes the press and cultural teams.

== Attack on the American Centre, Kolkata ==
Two motorcycle-borne attackers, draped in shawls, sped up to the American Centre building at about 6:15 IST, refusing to stop at checkpoints and began shooting at police guards from an AK-47 assault rifle who returned fire. Four of the dead were Kolkata police constables while one of the dead belonged to a private security agency Group Four. The constables killed in the attack were identified as Pijush Sarker, Ujjal Burman, Suresh Hembram and Anup Mondal and belonged to the 5th battalion of Kolkata Armed Police.

== Claim of responsibility ==
Two groups claimed responsibility for the attack. A Harkat-ul-Jihad al-Islami (HUJI) member, Farhan Malik, owned responsibility and said the attack was in protest against "the evil empire of America", while another person claiming to be a member of Asif Raza Commandos, a gang with ties to radical Islamic groups, claimed responsibility. Malik was also wanted in connection with the kidnapping a Kolkata shoe baron Partha Pratim Roy Barman, who was later released on a ransom of ₹37.5 million.

== Investigation and subsequent encounters ==
Four days after the attack, two men — Salim and Zahid — were killed in an encounter with police in Hazaribagh, Jharkhand. The police had come to know about the involvement of Aftab Ansari in the American Centre attack from the dying declarations of Salim and Zahid.

== Arrest, deportation, and conviction ==
On 23 January 2002, Aftab Ansari (alias Farhan Malik), prime suspect in the attack, was arrested in Dubai. On 9 February 2002, he was deported to India. Ansari was in possession of Pakistani travel documents with his passport number J872142, being issued in Lahore in February 2000, in the name of Shafiq Mohammad Rana. On 28 April 2005, a Special CBI Court found Ansari and six others guilty for the attack.

== Sentencing and appeals ==
Aftab Ansari and Jamiluddin Nasir were sentenced to death under Section 121 of the Indian Penal Code for waging war against the state. The others sentenced along with Ansari were Rehan Alam, Musharat Hussain, Adil Hasan, Hasrat Alam and Shakir Akhtar. On 5 February 2010, the Calcutta High Court upheld the death sentence of Ansari and Nasir but commuted the capital punishment awarded to three others to seven years imprisonment.

== See also ==
- Sajal Barui
- Bowbazaar Bomb Blast 1993
- List of terrorist incidents, 2002
