= Sajal Barui =

Indian criminal

Sajal Barui in 1997.

Sajal Barui (Bengali: সজল বারুই) is a convicted criminal who is serving a life sentence in prison for the murder of his father, stepmother, and half-brother. He committed the murders at the age of sixteen, on 22 November 1993 in Kolkata, India. The murders made headlines in the Kolkata press due to the gruesome nature of the crimes and because Barui and his accomplices were minors at the time.

== Early childhood ==
Sajal Barui's father, Subal Barui, abandoned his first wife, Neoti Barui, by whom he bore a son, and had a relationship with another woman, Minati. Sajal was conceived out of this affair. After a few years, his father returned to his first wife and took Sajal along with him. Sajal did not see his biological mother after the age of eight. After his arrest, he recounted how he had often been burned with burning cigarettes and hot irons in his childhood by his step-mother and elder step-brother

== The murders ==
On the night of 22 November 1993, Sajal and five of his friends, all of them teenagers, (between the age of 16–17 years) arrived at his residence in North Kolkata. Finding his stepmother alone, the group gagged her and tied her up to a chair. A similar fate befell his stepbrother when he arrived home, and his father, shortly before midnight. Sajal and one of his accomplices, Ranjit, initially tried to murder the three victims by strangling them, but only the stepmother succumbed. Unable to kill his father and stepbrother, Sajal and Ranjit hacked and stabbed them to death. The entire ordeal took nearly three hours.

After committing the crimes, on Sajal's directions, his friends cleaned their weapons with mustard oil and neatly organised them on the table. Exhausted with the exertion, they ate a few Bengali sweets from the refrigerator, and left a few coins on the table as "payment" for the food, an idea that had occurred to Sajal from watching a television programme.

Before Sajal's friends left, they tied him up to a chair and gagged him, to give the appearance that he was a victim too. Initially, he was able to allay suspicions. However, the Kolkata Police became suspicious, since he showed no signs of a struggle or any other injuries. Upon interrogation, he confessed to committing the murders and detailed the crimes. Later, the Calcutta High Court reduced the sentence to life imprisonment.

== Escape ==
Initially Sajal Barui had been serving his sentence at the Dum Dum Cantonment, but he was moved to Midnapore Central Jail in July 2000 due to "administrative problems". In 2001, while serving his prison sentence, Sajal Barui showed signs of an alleged kidney ailment and was transferred to Calcutta National Medical College and Hospital for examination. On 15 September 2001 he escaped from the hospital and was at large until early 2003. On the night of his escape, Sajal Barui hosted a beer party to which he invited the two police constables that had been put on guard to watch him. He often offered beer to the constables after it had been smuggled in by his girlfriend, so they did not suspect his motives. On that night, however, he spiked the two bottles of beer with sleeping pills and watched them fall asleep. He then walked out of the hospital unhindered.

== As a fugitive ==
After escaping from the police, Sajal Barui emailed a friend in Mumbai and fled there. He married there and returned to Kolkata, leaving his wife in Asansol. He committed a number of crimes under various aliases. Police officers of the Phoolbagan and Maniktala Police Stations of Calcutta were nearly successful in recapturing Sajal Barui in early 2003, after they were able to trace his girlfriend and set up a sting operation to recapture him. However, Sajal Barui did not show up for the arranged rendezvous. Sajal Barui then took refuge in the den of a local criminal known as Hathkata Bishu (Bengali for one-armed Bishu) in Lake Town, Kolkata. He worked with Bishu, under the alias Kamal, and was responsible for a robbery in the Ultadanga area of Kolkata. As the search for Kamal intensified, Sajal Barui, migrated to Jamboni, in West Midnapore district, to work for Rajeev Meti, a local criminal.

== Recapture ==
In late February 2003, a criminal who went by the name of Sheikh Raju was arrested for petty theft in the Jamboni area of West Midnapore district and was brought to Midnapore Central Jail. On 16 May 2003, after masquerading as Sheikh Raju for almost three months, this criminal was positively identified as Sajal Barui by a jailer who had met him earlier when he was serving his life sentence at the Alipore Central Jail in Kolkata.

On recapture, Sajal Barui was sent to the Presidency Jail in Dumdum. Here, he formed a network with the terrorist Aftab Ansari, the prime accused in the 2002 terrorist attack on the American Center in Kolkata, and Debashish Chakraborty, a criminal convicted of killing his girlfriend and attempting to kill his mother. Soon after this criminal nexus was discovered, Sajal Barui was shifted back to the Alipore Central Jail. Debashish Chakraborty was moved to Midnapore Central Jail, from which he escaped on 28 May 2005, only to be recaptured two days later. After serving some time in jail Sajal Barui was released in August 2010. In June 2011, he was arrested on charges of robbery. Barui was found guilty & was sentenced to imprisonment. He was released from prison in 2017. No further news of Barui has been obtained by the media since then.
