= 2005 Mong shootings =

Mosque attack in Punjab, Pakistan

Coordinates: 32.582001°N 73.487122°E

- Location of Mandi Bahauddin District, Punjab, Pakistan
- Location: Mong, Mandi Bahauddin, Punjab, Pakistan
- Date: 7 October 2005
- Target: Ahmadi Muslims
- Attack type: Shooting
- Deaths: 8
- Injuries: 20
- Motive: Sectarian violence among Muslims (Persecution of Ahmadis)

On 7 October 2005, a shooting attack took place at an Ahmadi mosque in Mong, Punjab, Pakistan, in which eight worshippers were killed and twenty were wounded during Namaz service. The two gunmen and their getaway driver were never identified.

== Background ==
The Ahmadiyya movement was started in 1889 and follows the teachings of Mirza Ghulam Ahmad who they believe was sent by God as a prophet and the Promised Messiah and Imam Mehdi prophesied in Islam "to end religious wars, condemn bloodshed and re-institute morality, justice and peace". It is estimated there are between three and four million Ahmadis in Pakistan.

The Ahmadiyya Muslims have previously been targeted by Sunni groups, while they have also suffered discrimination in Pakistan in the past, most significantly during the Lahore riots of 1953. They were declared non-Muslim in Pakistan in 1973 by Zulfikar Ali Bhutto and were legally banned from identifying themselves as such in 1984 during General Zia-ul-Haq's Islamisation as per Ordinance XX, despite Ahmadis calling themselves Muslim and following the rituals of Islam.

In August 2005, authorities closed down the offices of 16 publications run by followers of the sect in a Punjab city for "propagation of offensive material".

At the time of the attack, Mong, a village of around 18,000 residents in Mandi Bahauddin District, had a community of 150 Ahmadis.

== Attack ==
Three men riding on a motorcycle holding guns, came into Mong Rasul on Friday morning, during the second day of Ramadan. Two of the perpetrators, wearing black hoods and armed with automatic firearms, went inside the mosque and started firing immediately on the crowd of around forty worshippers. The attackers managed to escape after the attack. The leading imam, Sadiq Hussain Sherazi, stated that he escaped death by playing dead upon hearing the gunshots.

Two people were killed at the scene while six others died at hospitals the same day. Two critically injured people were transported to Lahore for treatment.

== Response ==
District police chief Waqar Haider stated a search was ongoing in the area around Mong, but he declined to speculate on the gunmen's identities. According to what a witness told Ahmadi author Qasim Rahid, police showed up several hours after the killing and "made no effort" to find the killers. Amnesty International stated that:

Police investigations of previous targeted killings of Ahmadis in Pakistan have been slow or have not taken place at all. In many cases the perpetrators have not been brought to justice. Amnesty International believes that the government's consistent failure to investigate attacks and killings of members of religious minorities fails to discourage further human rights abuses against such groups.

Interior Minister Aftab Sherpao stated: "We condemn this attack. Any act of violence in which innocent people are killed should be condemned."

Human rights groups have stated that Ahmadis have constantly suffered persecution in Pakistan and Shahbaz Bhatti, head of the All Pakistan Minorities Alliance, said the government had failed to protect minorities.
