= 1977 Bulawayo shooting =

Crime in Rhodesia

- Location: Bulawayo, Rhodesia
- Date: December 4, 1977; 7:00 – 7:30 p.m.
- Target: Shona people
- Attack type: Mass murder, spree shooting, mass shooting, active shooter incident, and workplace violence
- Weapon: Shotgun
- Deaths: 13
- Injuries: 13–16
- Perpetrator: Banda Khumalo
- Motive: Racism

The 1977 Bulawayo shooting was a spree shooting that occurred at two locations in Bulawayo, Rhodesia, on December 4, 1977. That day, Banda Khumalo, a 38-year-old off-duty policeman, shot 13 people to death and injured 13 to 16 others before being killed by a fellow police officer.

== Motive ==
Khumalo, a detective sergeant of the elite Special Branch security force, was a Ndebele, one of Rhodesia's two primary ethnic groups. He once had an argument with Shona people—the other major ethnic group—which motivated his shooting.

== Shootings ==
The first shooting occurred at 7:00 p.m. at a house in Mzilikazi Township. There, Khumalo shouted, "One bullet, one Shona," before fatally shooting two men and two women and injuring a fifth man with a shotgun. Some sources state that he also used a rifle.

Approximately 30 minutes later, Khumalo opened fire at houses in the Ross Police Camp, killing nine people and wounding up to 15 others. Among the dead were five children and three black policemen. Police then formed a cordon around the camp and a marksman shot the gunman to death.

== See also ==
- List of rampage killers in Africa
