= Matzuva attack =

Terrorist attack

- Part of the Second Intifada militancy campaign
- The attack site
- Location: 33°3′48″N 35°09′0″E; Near kibbutz Matzuva, Israel
- Date: March 12, 2002; 24 years ago
- Attack type: Ambush, mass shooting
- Weapons: Small arms, hand grenades
- Deaths: 5 Israeli civilians and 1 Israeli soldier (+2 attackers)
- Injuries: 1 Israeli civilian
- Perpetrator: Islamic Jihad claimed responsibility

The Matzuva attack was an attack on March 12, 2002, in which two Islamic Jihad militants who infiltrated Israel from Lebanon opened fire on civilian vehicles traveling on the Shlomi-Matzuva road. After killing a shepherd who was out with his flock, the militants, who were dressed in Israeli military uniforms and hid in underbrush, ambushed cars on the road, killing four motorists. The victims included a woman and her teenage daughter from Kibbutz Hanita. The militants were killed in a gunbattle with responding Israeli troops in which an Israeli officer was also killed. Afterwards scans of the area were carried out to ensure no more militants had infiltrated.

Initially, Israeli intelligence officials believed that the attack was organized by Hezbollah, although Hezbollah did not confirm this.

== See also ==
- 2000–2006 Shebaa Farms conflict
