= Matzuva =

Kibbutz in Western Galilee, Israel

Matzuva: מַצּוּבָה (Hebrew)

Hebrew transcription(s)
  - Official: Mazzuva
  - Unofficial: Matzuba
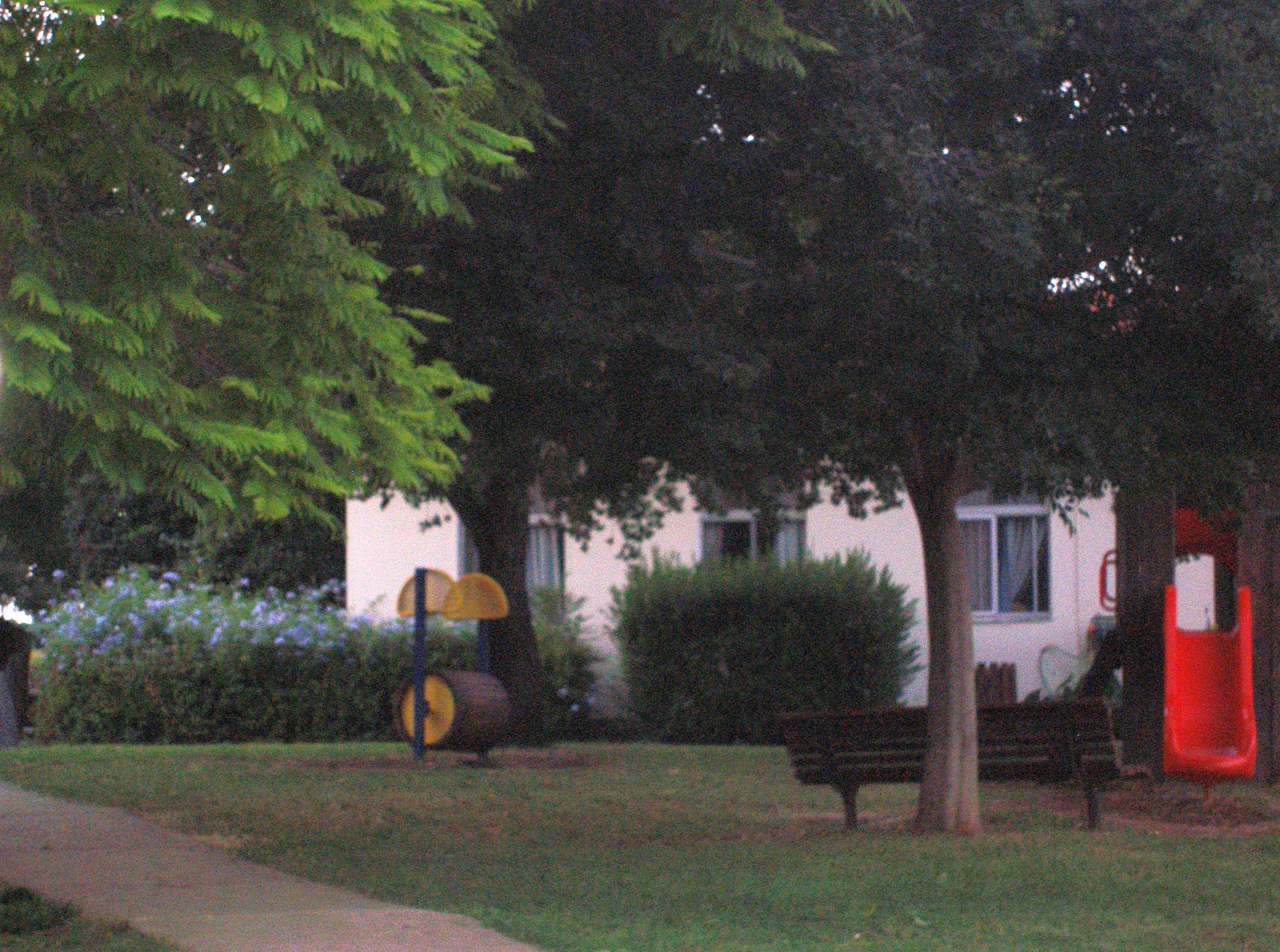

- Location within Northwest Israel Location within Israel
- Coordinates: 33°3′48″N 35°9′30″E
- Country: Israel
- District: Northern
- Subdistrict: Acre
- Council: Mateh Asher
- Affiliation: Kibbutz Movement
- Founded: 1940
- Founder: German, Czechoslovak, and Austrian Jewish members of Maccabi Hatzair
- Population (2024): 1,196

Matzuva (Hebrew: מַצּוּבָה), also known as Metzuba, is a kibbutz in the Western Galilee in northern Israel. Located to the south of the development town of Shlomi, it falls under the jurisdiction of Mateh Asher Regional Council. In 2024 it had a population of 1,196.

== Etymology ==
The settlement was named after the nearby Byzantine-period town of Pi-ha-Masuba, a place mentioned in the Tosefta (Shevi'it 4:8-ff.) and in the 3rd-century Mosaic of Rehob. The ancient Christian town was thoroughly destroyed in 613 or 614, never to regain its former size and wealth, but the name survived throughout the Early Muslim, Crusader, and into the Mamluk period. The remains of Byzantine-era Pi Metzuba, whose location was known from previous surveys, were actually discovered in 2020 along the road connecting Shlomi and Hanita, about two kilometers north of Matzuva.

The name is believed to have been derived from mṣwbh, a Semitic root, meaning 'pyramid' or 'pyramidal pile'.

== History ==
The process towards the founding of the kibbutz began with a group of immigrants from Germany, Czechoslovakia, and Austria, members of the Maccabi Hatzair youth movement, who came to Mandatory Palestine in 1934. In 1937, the group underwent hakhshara in Degania Alef and built an agricultural settlement near Hadera. In 1939, the group moved to Hanita, where they were joined by other recent immigrants who had come to Palestine through the Youth Aliyah program via Aliyah Bet ships, and had undergone hakhshara in Kfar HaHoresh.

On 9 February 1940, the kibbutz was erected in its current location, and was named for the nearby ruins. In its early days, the kibbutz suffered from malaria and lack of water. Some of its members worked outside the kibbutz in land development and forestry through the JNF. As such, the kibbutz began cultivating mushrooms in nearby caves. With the assistance of the ATA company and a German benefactor, a textile factory was set up on the kibbutz in 1943.

After the end of the Second World War, a large group of Hungarian Maccabi Hatzair members who had survived the Holocaust arrived to the kibbutz. On 16 June 1946, during the Night of the Bridges operation, wounded Palmach operatives were evacuated to the kibbutz, before being sent to nearby Hanita due to fear of the British military. As the kibbutz members refused to identify themselves, several were arrested and held in Acre Prison for two weeks.

According to the 1947 UN Partition Plan, Matzuva was intended to be in the territory of the designated Arab state. In late March 1948, kibbutz members bore witness to the Yehiam convoy attack. The kibbutz was under siege during the 1948 Arab-Israeli War until the surrounding area of the Galilee was conquered by Israeli forces in Operation Ben-Ami. Once the siege had been broken, the kibbutz's children were evacuated to a youth village in Kiryat Bialik, returning at the end of 1948 following Operation Hiram.

After the 1948 Arab–Israeli War, Matzuva expanded onto land near the Arab village of al-Bassa, which was depopulated in the war.

On March 12, 2002, two Arab gunmen carried out a deadly attack near Matzuva, killing six Israelis and shattering the calm that had prevailed along Israel's northern border since the withdrawal from Lebanon in May 2000. The attackers, disguised in Israeli military uniforms, first shot a shepherd near the kibbutz's pastureland, then ambushed passing cars on the Cabri–Shlomi road, killing four motorists including a woman and her 17-year-old daughter from Hanita. The gunmen were eventually killed in a gun battle with Israeli troops, though an Israeli officer also died. The attack was claimed by the Al Aksa Martyrs Brigades.

== Economy ==
Due to economic problems, the kibbutz textile factory closed down in 2003.

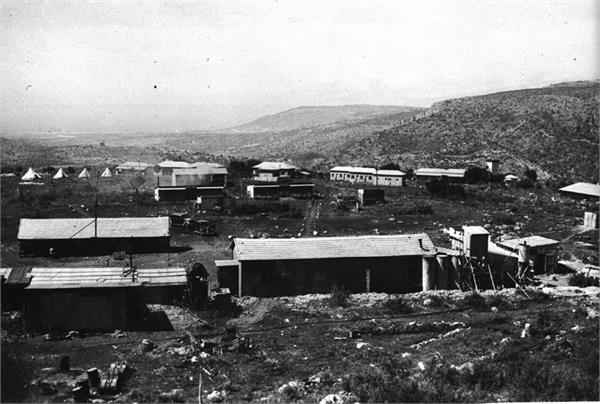
Matzuva 1942

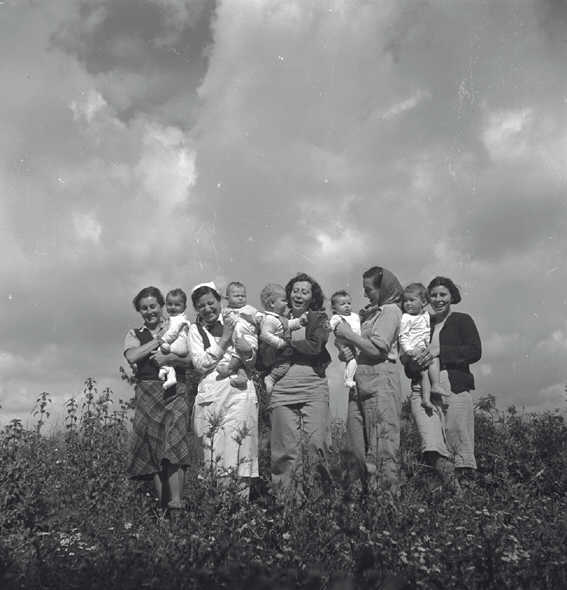
Matzuva 1943 JNF photograph

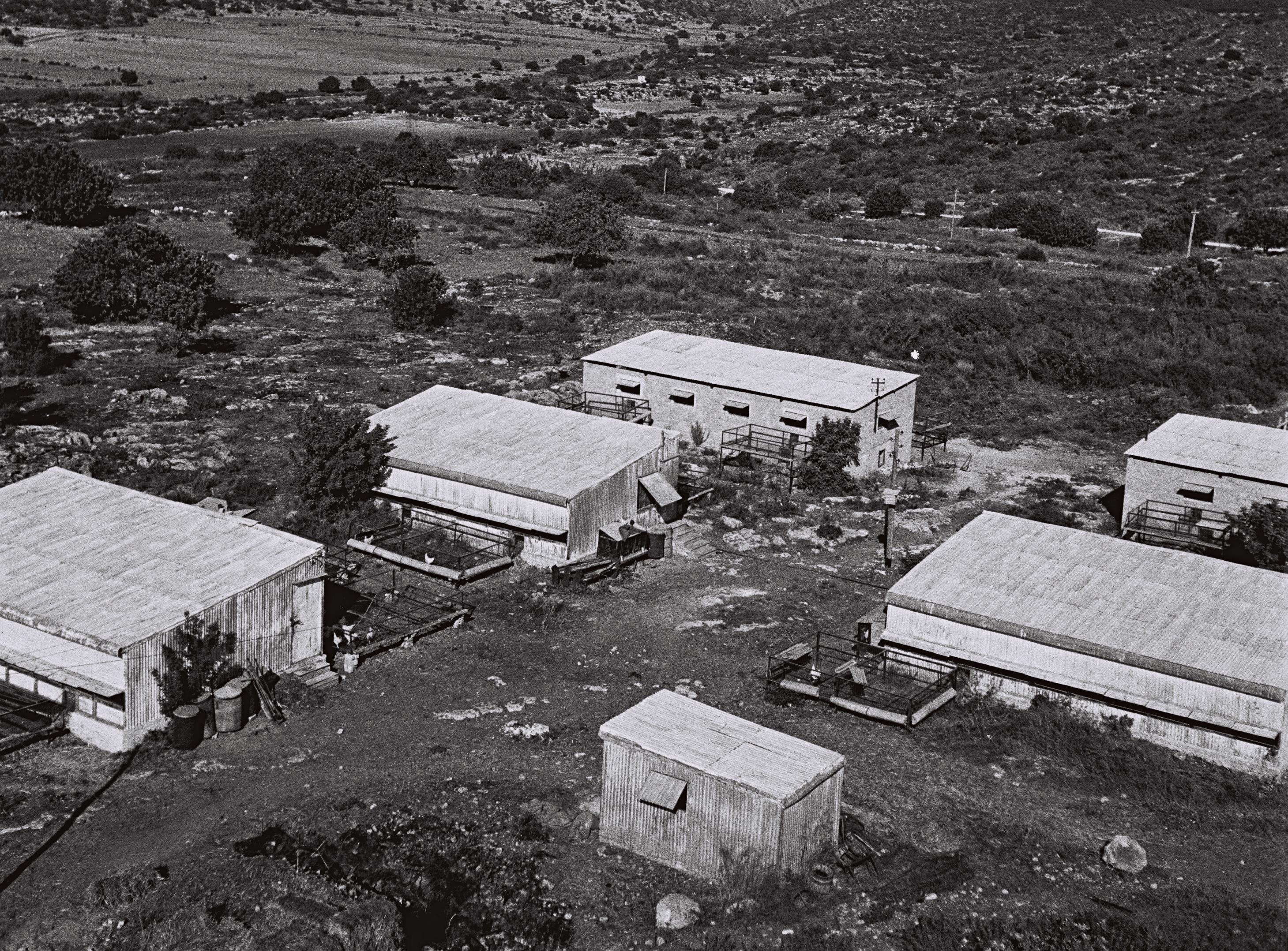
Kibbutz Matzuva, 1946

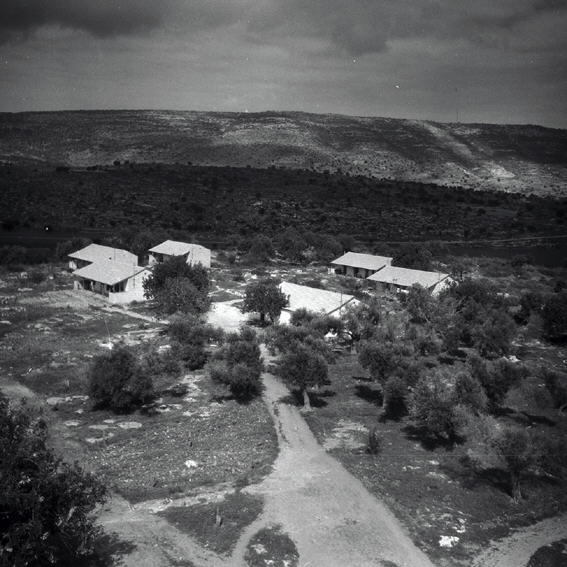
Matzuva 1947

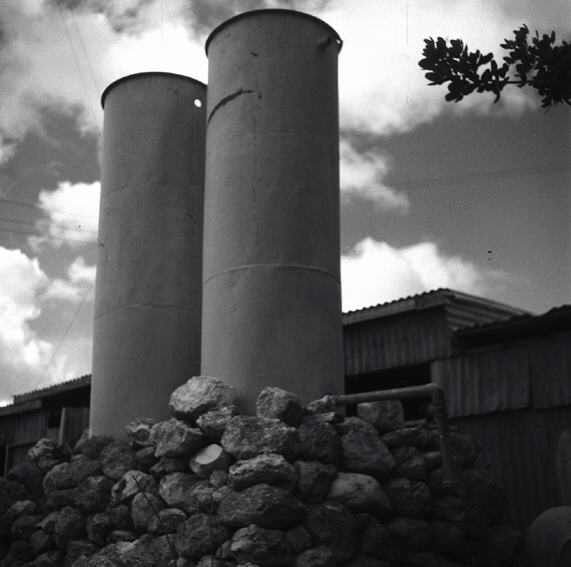
Matzuva water tanks & fortress 1947

== See also ==
- Matzuva attack, a 2002 cross-border terrorist attack
