= List of ETA attacks =

This page is a list of attacks undertaken (or believed to have been undertaken) by Euskadi Ta Askatasuna (ETA), a paramilitary and armed Basque separatist group, mainly in Spain. The list includes attacks by all the branches and divisions that ETA had through its history, as well as some kale borroka attacks. Important failed attacks are also included.

Since 1961, ETA conducted many attacks against a variety of targets. Because these attacks number in the hundreds over a span of more than 45 years, not all can be included here. This incomplete list may include attacks noted for being the first of their kind made by the organization, first in a particular area, notability of targets, large number of victims, unique method of attack, or other historic significance. The list is of those attacks described above between 1961 and 2011.

== Overview ==
ETA deaths by status of victim
Status	No.
Civilian	343
Members of security forces	486
of whom:
Guardia Civil	203
Cuerpo Nacional de Policía	146
Spanish Army	98
Policia Municipal	24
Ertzaintza	13
Mossos d'Esquadra	1
French National Police	1
Total
829 people killed

The number of people killed by ETA is sometimes disputed. The Spanish Interior Ministry, the Basque government, and major news agencies state that 829 people were killed in ETA attacks. Some victims' organizations such as the Asociación de Víctimas del Terrorismo and the Colectivo de Víctimas del Terrorismo en el País Vasco place the death toll of ETA's victims at 952, including in the list Iberian Revolutionary Liberation Directory's victim Begoña Urroz (regarded by some sources as ETA's first victim) and several unresolved attacks, and the Hotel Corona de Aragón fire.

From 1968 until 2002, there were more than 3,300 ETA attacks, which also left more than 2,000 people injured.

== Chronology ==
=== 1961–1969 ===
- July 18, 1961: In the organization's first known attack, ETA activists unsuccessfully attempt to derail trains carrying Franco supporters to commemorative celebrations in San Sebastián.
- September 24, 1965: An ETA unit intercepts and robs a bank courier.
- April 1967: ETA activists assault the Banco Guipuzcoano in Villabona, taking over one million pesetas in ETA's first direct bank robbery.
- December 1967: An ETA squad attempts to blow up buildings in Eibar and Elgoibar (both in Gipuzkoa). During the getaway, an exchange of gunfire with the members of the Guardia Civil at a roadblock wounds two of the ETA activists.
- June 7, 1968: Two ETA activists, Txabi Etxebarrieta and Iñaki Sarasqueta, kill Guardia Civil member José Pardines at a roadblock. It is the first death attributed to ETA. Following the incident, the two ETA activists are shot at another roadblock. Etxebarrieta is killed, while Sarasqueta is wounded.
- August 2, 1968: An ETA squad shoots and kills Melitón Manzanas, commander of the Francoist political police division in San Sebastián, as he returns to his home in Irun (Gipuzkoa). It is ETA's first planned assassination. The Franco government declares a "state of exception" in the province the next day.

=== 1970–1979 ===
Luis Carrero Blanco

- January 17, 1972: ETA kidnaps Lorenzo Zabala Suinaga, the ethnic Basque director of a factory where striking workers were recently fired. ETA demands that the factory make concessions to its workers. These conditions are largely met on January 22, the strikers return to work, and Zabala is found unharmed in a rural area on the night of January 24.
- August 29, 1972: ETA activists kill Galdakao policeman Eloy Garcia in a shootout.
- January 16, 1973: An ETA commando kidnaps Navarran industrialist Felipe Huarte from his home. ETA demands 50 million pesetas and concessions to striking workers at a factory owned by Huarte. With payment of the ransom and resolution of the labor dispute, Huarte is released on January 26.
- January 31, 1973: ETA activists assault a powder magazine near Hernani (Gipuzkoa) and take 3,000 kilograms of explosives, later hiding them in the same "safe house" near San Sebastián where Felipe Huarte had been kept.
- December 20, 1973: Prime Minister Admiral Luis Carrero Blanco is killed along with his driver and a bodyguard when ETA detonates explosives under his passing vehicle on a Madrid street as Carrero Blanco returns from Mass. The tunnel in which the explosives were placed had been prepared over nearly two years
- September 13, 1974: The Cafetería Rolando bombing. Located near the Dirección General de Seguridad (Directorate-General of Security) and another police building, the explosion inside the cafe kills and wounds an unclear number of patrons (reported as nine and fifty-six, respectively, by The New York Times). ETA officially denies responsibility, but several leftists are arrested and charged with the crime later claim the organization provided the explosives and expertise for the bombing.
- December 18, 1974: An ETA squad unsuccessfully attempts to steal 25 million pesetas from a factory near Urduliz, wounding two members of the Guardia Civil while escaping.
- December 28, 1974: ETA activists rob the Banco de Bilbao in Vitoria, taking six million pesetas.
- March 30, 1975: A police inspector named José Diaz Linares is killed in San Sebastián by ETA.
- April 22, 1975: A policeman named Morán is killed by ETA in Algorta.
- May 14, 1975: ETA kills a Guardia Civil lieutenant in Guernica.
- October 5, 1975: Three agents of the Guardia Civil are killed when an ETA bomb destroys their vehicle while on patrol in the mountains of Gipuzkoa.
- November 24, 1975: In the organization's first attack since the death of Franco on November 20, ETA assassinates Antonio Echeverría, the mayor of Oyarzun (Gipuzkoa) and alleged police informer.
- January 15, 1976: ETA activists kidnap José Luis Arrasate, son of a Basque industrialist, from his home in Berriz. The family is unable to pay the ransom, and amid condemnation from various Basque groups, Arrasate is released unharmed on February 15.
- February 1976: Victor Legoburu, mayor of Galdakao and alleged police informer, is killed by ETA.
- March 18, 1976: ETA kidnaps and kills Angel Berazadi, a Basque industrialist.
- April 1976: ETA claims responsibility for the killings of two Spanish policemen in Southern France. Later in the month, the group electrocutes guardia civil Miguel Gordo Garcia when he attempts to remove a booby-trapped Basque flag in Barakaldo.
- October 4, 1976: Assassination of Juan María de Araluce Villar. In a daytime machine gun attack on the streets of San Sebastián, ETA activists kill Juan María De Araluce Villar, president of the Provincial Assembly of Gipuzkoa and member of the Council of the Realm, along with his driver and three police guards. Ten bystanders are wounded.
- October 8, 1977: In Guernica, ETA gunmen kill Augusto Guillermo Unceta Barrenechea, president of the Provincial Assembly of Biscay, along with two guardia civil who had been escorting him.
- May 9, 1978: In Pamplona, a bomb concealed in a streetlight explodes as a Guardia Civil vehicle passes, killing agent Manuel Lopez Gonzalez.
- September 25, 1978: ETA gunmen kill two guardia civiles in San Sebastián, then hijack a taxi while making their escape.
- October 22, 1978: ETA gunmen ambush four civil guards, killing three of them and wounding the fourth in an attack in Getxo.
- 3 January 1979: ETA gunmen shoot at point-blank range and kill general Constantino Ortín, military governor of Madrid.
- July 28, 1979: three bombs in Barajas Airport and Atocha and Chamartín train stations, kill 7 people and injured a further 100. The attacks came a day after attacks in Bilbao and San Sebastian had killed four people.

=== 1980–1989 ===
- February 1, 1980: 6 Civil Guards are killed in an ambush at Ispaster after their convoy was attacked with guns and grenades. 2 ETA members are also killed by a grenade they had thrown. This was the deadliest incident of 1980.
- April 16, 1980: 2 Civil Guards are killed after the border post they were manning was attacked with gunfire.
- May 15, 1980: 3 Policía Nacional officers are shot dead by an ETA gunman at a cafe in San Sebastián.
- July 13, 1980: In an ambush in Orio, ETA attempts a repeat of the attack in Ispaster earlier in the year and kills 2 Civil Guards. However a subsequent gunfight results in the death of 2 ETA members.
- September 20, 1980: 4 civil guards are killed in attack in a bar in Markina
- October 3, 1980: 3 police officers are killed after their car was strafed with gunfire in Durango.
- October 4, 1980: Three unmasked gunmen murder 3 Civil Guards minutes before the start of a cycling race that was to have kicked off a local fiesta in Agurain/Salvatierra, Àlava The murders received particular notoriety because the local priest, Ismael Arrieta Pérez de Mendiola, provided details to help the terrorists plan the attack. Father Ismael received 10 years in prison for each of the 3 murders (which the Supreme Court of Spain later reduced to 18 years).
- November 3, 1980: ETA's second deadliest attack of the year sees 5 people, four of them civil guards, killed in a gun attack in a bar in Zarautz
- May 7, 1981: 3 members of the Spanish military are killed after a bomb was placed on top of their vehicle in Madrid.
- 1981: A bomb exploded in the hull, near the boiler area of the Spanish destroyer Marqués de la Ensenada (D-43) while anchored in the port city of Santander, Cantabria, Spain.
- March 23, 1982: An ETA gun attack kills 2 police inspectors and a civilian in Sestao.
- September 14, 1982: ETA's deadliest attack of the year occurs in Rentería, where they ambush and kill four police officers.
- May 28, 1983: 2 Civil Guards were killed by gunmen in Pamplona while guarding a post office.
- April 13, 1984: A booby trap bomb in a car kills 2 policemen in Pamplona. Earlier in the day a retired army commander was shot dead by ETA gunmen, also in Pamplona.
- December 7, 1984: A bomb hidden in a car detonates as a military convoy passes in the town of Galdakao. 2 soldiers and a civilian are killed.
- May 22, 1985: 2 off-duty policemen are shot dead near San Sebastián.
- May 30, 1985: A 14-year-old boy and a policeman are killed by a bomb in Pamplona.
- September 1985: A car bomb in Madrid kills an American citizen and wounds 16 Civil Guards.
- February 6, 1986: Rear Admiral Cristóbal Colón de Carvajal y Maroto and his driver; the Rear Admiral, descended from Cristóbal Colón.
- June 17, 1986: 3 members of Spanish army are shot dead inside a car while driving through Madrid.
- July 14, 1986: Plaza República Dominicana bombing. A car bomb on República Dominicana square in Madrid explodes at the passing of a small bus carrying young Civil Guards, killing 12 of them and injuring 50 people.
- January 30, 1987: A car bomb by the Plaza del Pilar in Zaragoza explodes at the passing of a military bus carrying personnel and teachers of the General Military Academy, killing 1 officer and the bus driver and injuring more than 40, some critically.
- June 19, 1987: Hipercor bombing: A car bomb explodes in the underground car park of an Hipercor supermarket in Barcelona, killing 21 civilians, mostly women (one pregnant) and several small children, and injuring 45.
- July 14, 1987: A roadside bomb explodes beside a Civil Guard patrol in Oñate, killing 2.
- August 6, 1987: A bomb kills 2 policemen in Vitoria.
- September 9, 1987: A car bomb detonates outside the Civil Guard headquarters in Guernica. 2 Civil Guards are killed.
- December 11, 1987: Zaragoza barracks bombing: 250 kg of explosives inside a car bomb explode next to the Civil Guard's Barracks in Zaragoza, killing 11 people, including 5 children and injuring 88.
- April 15, 1988: 2 policemen are shot dead in Vitoria.
- August 21, 1988: A car bomb in Estella kills 2 police officers.
- September 10, 1988: 2 police men of the anti-terrorism brigade are shot dead in Izurtza.
- November 22, 1988: A bomb outside a Civil Guard building in Madrid kills 2 civilians, one of whom was a 2-year-old child.
- May 8, 1989: A booby-trap bomb kills 2 policemen in Madrid.
- May 24, 1989: A car bomb in Bilbao killed 2 officers of the National Police and 1 Ertzaintza.
- June 26, 1989: A large bomb exploded outside a Civil Guard barracks in the town of Llodio, thirteen miles from Bilbao.
- July 19, 1989: A commander and colonel in the Spanish army are shot dead by gunmen in Madrid.
- September 12, 1989: Anti-terrorist prosecutor from the Audiencia Nacional Carmen Tagle is shot dead in front of her home.
- October 1989-July 1990: ETA attacks in the Netherlands.

=== 1990–1999 ===
==== 1990 ====
- January 27: A small bomb explodes outside a bar near Pamplona.
- January 30: A bomb hidden in a bicycle explodes in Bilbao, killing a police officer.
- February 5: A bomb, hidden in a garbage bag, was defused outside a civil guard barracks in Ortuella.
- February 6: A booby-trap bomb was placed under a police officer's car in Ortuella. The device was defused.
- February 27: A parcel bomb severely injures the president of the Audiencia Nacional.
- February 28: A parcel bomb seriously injures a post office worker.
- March 1: A retired lieutenant was severely injured after being shot in the head in San Sebastian.
- March 3: A grenade was fired at the civil guard barracks in Amorebieta, but failed to explode.
- March 6: Police intercept a letter bomb sent to the Interior Minister.
- March 14: A prison official was shot dead in San Sebastian.
- April 4: A civil guard cook was shot dead near San Sebastian.
- April 6: A gunman shoots dead a drug trafficker and his wife while they are leaving a bar in San Sebastian.
- April 7: in Lekunberri 6 grenades are launched at a civil guard barracks at 10-minute intervals, injuring 2 guards. A booby trap bomb planted at the launch site injured another 2 officers and killed a sniffer dog.
- April 19: A letter bomb seriously injures an official for the Seville Expo '92.
- April 23: A letter bomb moderately injured a prison official. A second package was sent to the Ministry of Justice but was defused.
- May 9: The Tour of Spain cycling event was disrupted by 2 bomb explosions near the race route. No one was injured.
- May 16: A parcel bomb returned from Seville was defused in Burgos.
- June 3: A former police officer was shot dead in Pamplona.
- June 10: A civilian is shot dead in Algorta.
- June 13: A retired army colonel was shot dead in San Sebastian.
- June 18: A bomb explodes under the car of a police officer.
- June 20: A bomb was defused under the car of a police officer.
- June 25: A gun battle along the river Irati leaves 2 ETA members and a civil guard dead.
- June 28: A retired army captain was shot dead in San Sebastian.
- July 7: A police officer lost both his legs in an under car booby-trap bomb in Barakaldo.
- July 12: In Algorta a remote control bomb seriously injured a civil guard.
- August 12: 4 grenades were fired at the civil guard barracks in Zarautz.
- August 14: A bomb explodes on the León-Gijón railway line.
- August 14: A bomb placed under a police officer's car was defused in San Sebastian.
- August 17: A second bomb explodes on a railway line.
- August 17: A car bomb damages the central police station in Burgos. 48 people were lightly injured.
- August 21: An ETA member is killed by his own bomb in Oiartzun.
- August 28: Two bars are damaged by bombs in San Sebastian.
- August 30: A parcel bomb addressed to a civil guard colonel was defused in Intxaurrondo.
- August 31: A bomb destroys a boat docked at a navy port in San Sebastian.
- September 1: A civilian and a police officer are killed by a car bomb in Bilbao.
- September 9: Two explosions occur at an oil refinery in Tarragona.
- September 11: A car bomb wounds 17 outside a civil guard barracks in Cartagena.
- September 16: A bomb lightly wounded two police officers in Bilbao.
- September 18: A gunfight erupts between a police patrol and an ETA group preparing to kill an alleged drug dealer. 1 ETA gunman is killed.
- September 22: 3 grenades are fired at the police headquarters in San Sebastian.
- September 26: A bomb is found planted under a police vehicle in Basauri.
- September 27: A bomb explodes in Renteria.
- October 6: A bar owner was shot dead in Plentzia.
- October 17: A 50-kilogramme car bomb was defused outside a car dealership in San Sebastian.
- October 23: A 70 kilogramme car bomb was defused near a civil guard barracks in Pesues.
- November 2: 2 grenades were thrown at the civil guard barracks in Balmaseda.
- November 8 : In Pasaia 2 policemen were wounded by a bicycle bomb.
- November 18: A van bomb in Santurce kills 2 policemen.
- November 23: A car bomb explodes outside a civil guard barracks in Sant Carles de la Ràpita.
- December 1: A bomb explodes in bar in San Sebastian.
- December 8: A car bomb explodes in the town of Sabadell (Barcelona) killing 6 Policía Nacional officers and injuring 10 people, including two other police officers. The officers died when a car bomb went off as the officer's van passed.
- December 9: A bomb explodes in a military barracks in San Sebastian.
- December 13: A newspaper seller, accused of being a police informer, is shot dead in San Sebastian.
- December 14: A policeman is killed by a bomb in Amorbieta.
- December 14: In San Sebastian a police officer was lightly injured after a bomb exploded while he was refueling his car.
- December 15: A civilian was lightly injured after a bomb exploded outside a police station in Basauri.
- December 17: A letter bomb seriously injures a woman at her home in Madrid after her husband had stolen the package from a sorting office.
- December 20: 12 people are injured after a car bomb explodes near a military barracks in Valencia.
- December 27: A letter bomb sent to a construction company is defused by police.
- December 28: A car bomb is defused outside a civil guard headquarters in Durango.

==== 1991 ====
- January 1: Police carried out a controlled explosion on a bomb in a post office in Vitoria.
- January 2: Colonel Luis Garcia Lozano was shot dead in his office in San Sebastian.
- January 8: In Bilbao a woman and her 11-year-old daughter were injured when a bomb exploded underneath the van they were in. Their family was alleged by ETA to be involved in drug trafficking.
- January 9: An alleged drug trafficker was seriously injured by a bomb placed under his van. He died 2 days later.
- January 10: In the third such attack in as many days, a man was seriously injured by an under car booby trap bomb in San Sebastian.
- January 18: A bomb explodes in a block of buildings in San Sebastian.
- January 22: A small bomb exploded in a bank in Pamplona.
- January 31: A former civil guard was shot dead in Bilbao
- February 4: 2 bombs exploded in San Sebastian.
- February 5: a building inhabited by police officers and their families in San Sebastian was evacuated after a small bomb exploded beside it.
- February 14: a navy patrol boat was sunk by a bomb in Hondarribia. There were no reported injuries. In another incident a bomb placed in a Telefónica building in San Sebastian was defused.
- February 15: a car bomb exploded outside of a prison in Malaga. No significant damage was caused and 10 people suffered minor injuries.
- February 19: a small bomb damaged an excavator working on a highway project in Pamplona.
- February 21: a bank in Pamplona suffered minor damage from a bomb.
- March 2: 5 civil guards and a civilian were injured after a large truck bomb exploded outside of a refinery in Somorrostro.
- March 3: 5 cars were damaged by fire after a bomb exploded at a Renault dealership in San Sebastian.
- March 4: In Valencia José Edmundo Casañ, the regional delegate of the construction company Ferrovial, was shot dead in his office. Approximately 15 minutes later elsewhere in the city a car bomb was defused by police.
- March 7: a car bomb caused significant damage after it exploded outside the headquarters of the construction company Fomento de Construcciones y Contratas in Madrid. There were no injuries.
- May 29: A car bomb loaded with 70 kg of explosives is detonated inside the Civil Guard's Casa Cuartel in Vic (Barcelona), which was located next to a school. 10 people are killed (4 of them children) and 44 are injured. The day after the bombing, two members of the ETA cell which carried out the attack, were killed by the Civil Guard in a raid on a house at Lliçà d'Amunt, near Barcelona.
- May 30: A police officer was seriously injured in Bilbao after a bomb planted under the driver's seat of his car detonated.
- June 5: Lieutenant Aguilar Prieto, a member of the Air Force, was killed after a bomb detonated under his car in Madrid. 4 teenagers standing at a bus stop near by were injured. In Italy the office of Iberia in Milan and the Spanish school in Bologna were damaged by bombs.
- June 12: 2 policemen are killed trying to defuse a bomb in Madrid.
- June 13: Civil Guard Ricardo Ríos was shot dead while sitting in his car in Trápaga. The victim was waiting on his son leaving school when he was shot.
- June 23: A 50 kilogram car bomb exploded outside of a police station in Madrid injuring 5 officers. Dozens of homes and cars nearby were damaged in the blast.
- June 25: A police officer escaped death whenever a bomb planted onto his car detached from it in Basauri.
- June 28: A prison guard, 2 inmates and a civilian are killed by parcel bomb in a Seville prison.
- July 1: A parcel bomb, similar to the one sent to a Seville prison a few days prior, detonates in Madrid. 2 police officers attempting to defuse the devise are killed. A third dies a few days later.
- July 6: 2 incendiary devices detonate inside of tour buses used by Spanish tourists in Rome. There are no injuries.
- July 27: A car bomb detonated in San Sebastian as a police vehicle passed. While major damage was caused to the surroundings, no injuries were reported. In a separate attack earlier in the day a car bomb detonated outside of a Civil Guards barracks in Irún. 4 Guards and 12 family members were lightly injured in the blast.
- July 28: A Civil Guard was killed and another was injured by a bomb in Getxo. The two Guards were inside of an unmarked vehicle whenever a car bomb exploded as they passed.
- August 2: Two businessmen were injured by a parcel bomb in Madrid. The construction firm they both worked for had been contracted to build a highway between San Sebastian and Pamplona.
- September 16: in the Mutxamel bombing, ETA attempts to repeat the Vic bombing, with a car bomb attack on the Civil Guard barracks in Mutxamel near Alicante, but the car bomb fails to hit its target. After being towed away as an abandoned vehicle, the car bomb explodes, killing a tow truck driver and two policemen.
- October 23: 2 civil guards are shot dead inside a bar in San Sebastian.
- November 7: In Erandio one child is killed by a car bomb.
- December 13: In Barcelona 2 national policemen are shot dead.

==== 1992 ====
- January 15: University of Valencia Professor, Manuel Broseta Pont, is shot dead by ETA in the gardens in front of the University on the Avenida de Blasco Ibañez, Valencia
- January 16: 2 non-commissioned officers are shot dead in Barcelona.
- February 6: in their deadliest attack of the year, an ETA car bomb kills 4 soldiers and 1 civilian employee of the army in Plaza de la Cruz Verde, 200 metres from the army headquarters in Madrid.
- August 17: 2 civil guards are shot dead while shopping in Oyarzun.

==== 1993 ====
- June 21: A car bomb explodes at the passing of a military van at the junction of López de Hoyos and Joaquín Costa streets in Madrid, killing 6 soldiers, 1 civilian and injuring 20 people.

==== 1994 ====
- April 18: A passer-by was killed and eight people wounded in Barcelona when ETA men fired two mortars targeting a military headquarters on La Rambla.
- April 28: José Benigno Villalobos Blanco a Corporal First of Guardia civil is shot dead in back at entrance of his house building in Trapagarán, Biscay.
- July 19: An army lieutenant is killed by a bomb in Madrid. His driver and a passerby are also killed by the blast.

==== 1995 ====
- 1995: Assassination plot on King Juan Carlos of Spain failed.
- April 19: Unsuccessful attempt to kill José María Aznar, the leader of Spain's right-wing opposition and future Prime Minister. A car bomb loaded with 40 kg of explosives is detonated at the passing of his official car. He is saved by his vehicle's armor plating but a bystander is killed in the blast.
- December 11: A car bomb explodes at the passing of military van in the Vallecas district of Madrid, killing 6 civilians who worked for the Army. The explosion also left 17 people injured and great damage around the area.

==== 1996 ====
- January 17: Abduction of José Antonio Ortega Lara, civil servant in a prison in Logroño. ETA demands the relocation of imprisoned ETA members for the restoration of his freedom. Ortega Lara is rescued by the police 532 days later on July 1, 1997. This has been the longest kidnapping ever in Spain.
- July 20: Bombs at Reus Airport injured 35 people, mostly British tourists.

==== 1997 ====
- July 10: Abduction of Basque councillor Miguel Ángel Blanco, prompting six million Spaniards to join mass demonstrations against ETA. The organization asks the government to relocate all imprisoned ETA members in prisons closer to the Basque Country in 48 hours. When the government does not accept this demand, Miguel Angel Blanco is shot and dies on July 13.

==== 1998 ====
- 30 January: A PP councillor and his wife are shot dead at a restaurant in Seville.

==== 1999 ====
- December 21–22: The Spanish Civil Guard intercepts a Madrid-bound van driven by ETA members and loaded with 950 kg of explosives near Calatayud (Zaragoza); the next day, another van loaded with 750 kg is found not far from there. The incident is known as "la caravana de la muerte" (the convoy of death). Shortly after 9/11, ETA confirmed their plan had been to use those 1,700 kg to blow down Torre Picasso (online report with video in Spanish).

=== 2000–2011 ===
==== 2000 ====
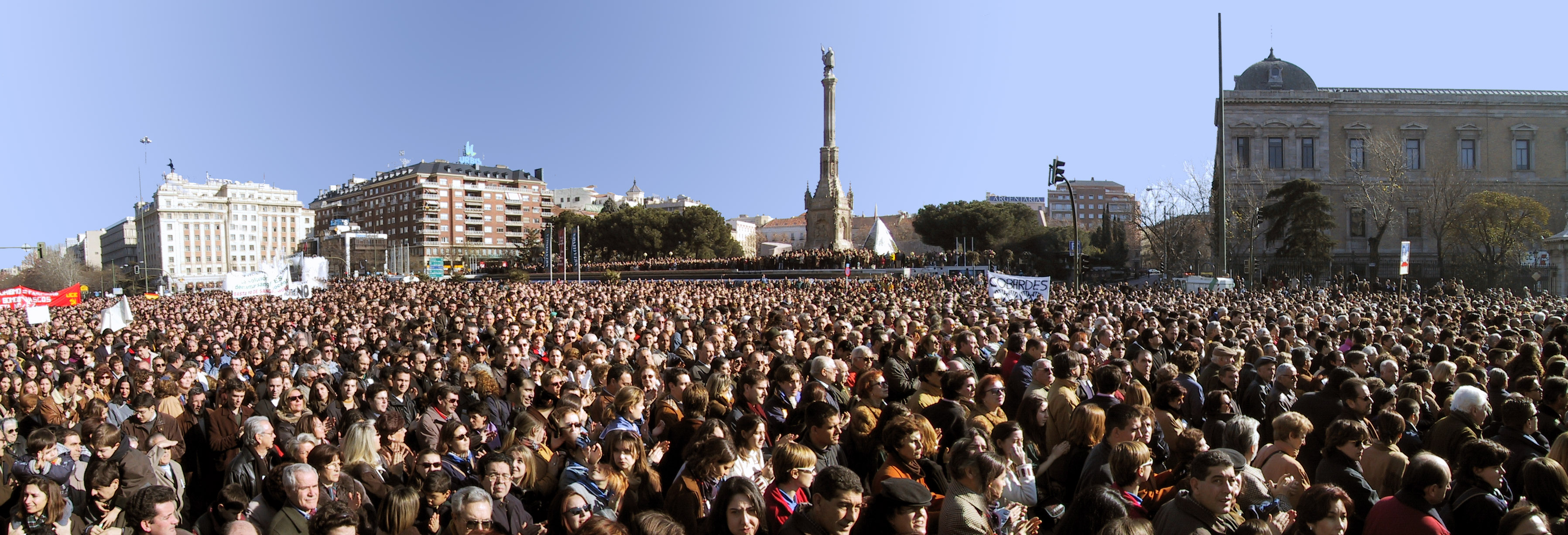
Demonstration in Madrid against the killing of Pedro Antonio Blanco Garcia

- January 21: ETA ends a 19-month lull in their guerrilla war with two massive car bombs in Madrid that kill Spanish army officer Pedro Antonio Blanco Garcia. Four people were reported injured, including one child. No injuries were reported for the second blast. A police officer was reported to have died in a shootout after the attack.
- February 22: An ETA car bomb kills the secretary general of the Socialist Party for the Basque province of Álava, Fernando Buesa Blanco, and his bodyguard. The bomb was detonated as they walked past in a university campus in Vitoria.
- March 6: A car bomb loaded with 30 kg of explosives goes off at the passing of a Civil Guard patrol in San Sebastián. 7 people were injured.
- March 21: A homemade bomb explodes in front of the house of journalist Pedro Briongos. The explosion caused damage to the building but no injuries.
- March 27: ETA tries to kill Spanish National Radio journalist Carlos Herrera with a letter bomb sent to his office in Seville. The device was defused by police.
- May 7: José Luis López de la Calle, a journalist and contributor to the Basque edition of the Madrid-based daily El Mundo is shot dead outside his home in Andoain.
- June 4: José María Pedrosa Urkiza, People's Party town councillor for Durango, is shot dead by ETA members.
- July 7: Ertzaintza officers defuse a bomb attached to the car of a businessman in the town of Ordizia, Gipuzkoa.
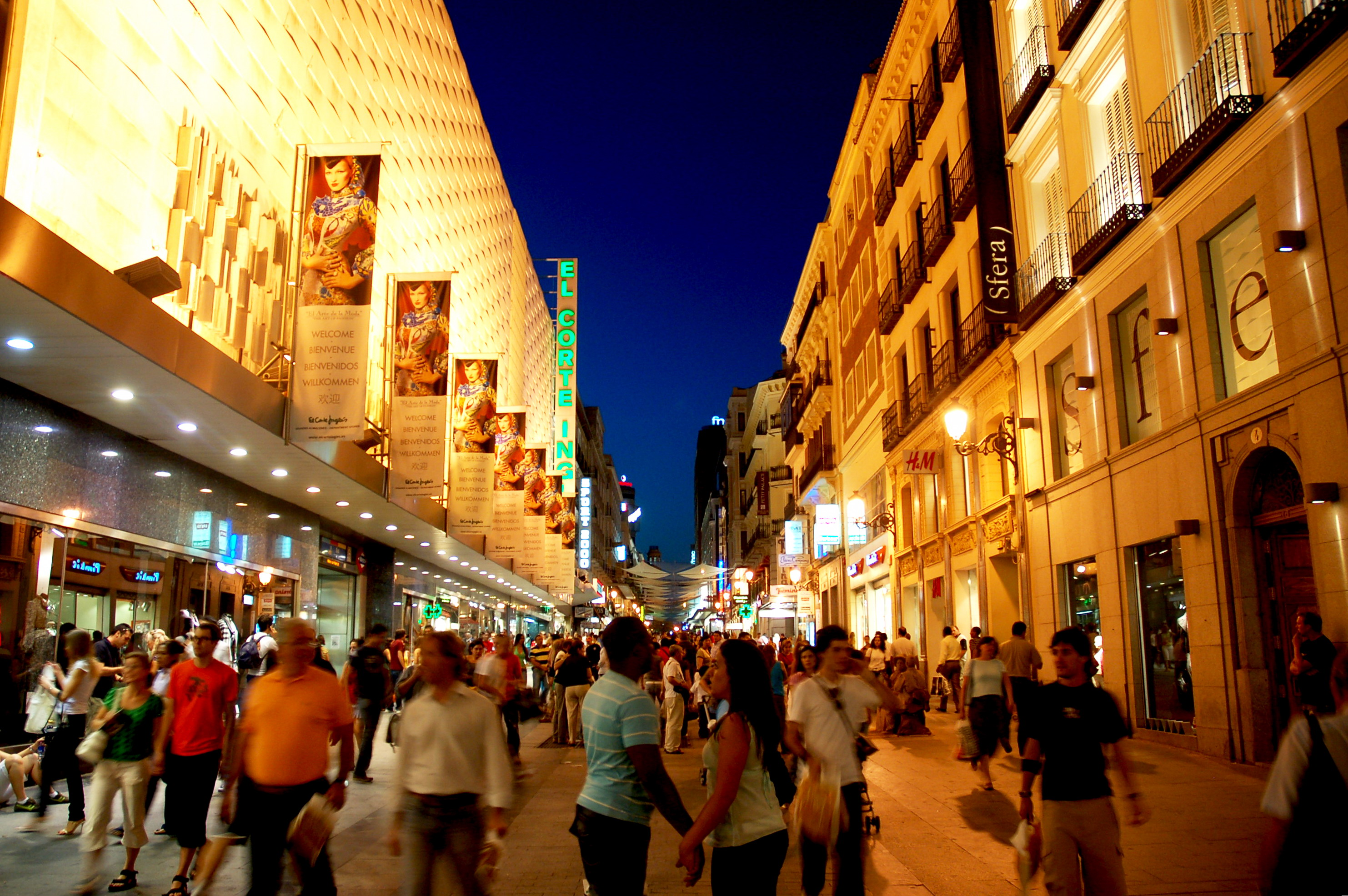
  The July 12, 2000 car bomb caused great damage to El Corte Ingles and FNAC shopping centers in Preciados street of Madrid
- July 12: A car bomb goes off in the center of Madrid injuring 12 people. The explosion was an attempt to kill police officers, as the device exploded 10 minutes before the scheduled time and officers were still clearing off the area.
- July 15: A local People's Party politician, Jose Maria Martin Carpena, is shot dead in the city of Málaga, Andalusia.
- July 16: A car bomb explodes in a Civil Guard barracks in the town of Ágreda, Soria slightly injuring one person and causing great damage.
- July 18: ETA sets off a powerful bomb in a shopping centre in Vitoria. No one was injured in the attack, which also destroyed the headquarters of a bank.
- July 19: A bomb is found attached to a car belonging to senior Socialist politician Jose Asenjo in the city of Málaga. The bomb safely detonated by police.
- July 20: A car loaded with explosives is defused by police in Málaga after a warning call from ETA.
- July 24: A car bomb explodes in Getxo and damages the house of People's Party Senator Pilar Aresti. 4 people were injured in the attack.
- July 26: Police defuse a bomb attached to the car of People's Party councillor Agustín Ramos Vallejo in Durango.
- July 27: A 1,5 kg bomb explodes in a bank machine in Vitoria.
- July 29: ETA members shot dead Socialist politician Juan María Jáuregui in Tolosa, Gipuzkoa. A car bomb, used to run away, exploded hours later in Villabona.
- August 7: Four members of ETA die when a bomb exploded in their car in Bilbao. Police suspected they were taking the vehicle loaded with explosives to use as a car bomb somewhere in the city.
- August 8: A car bomb explodes in Zumaia, Gipuzkoa killing José Maria Korta Uranga, the president of an employers' organization. Later that day, a car bomb exploded in Madrid, injuring 11 people.
- August 9: ETA gunmen kill Spanish lieutenant Francisco Casanova Vicente in Pamplona. Tension rises in Spain with anti and pro-ETA demonstrations and riots.
- August 20: A car bomb in the town of Sallent de Gallego, Huesca kills two young Civil Guards.
- August 24: A series of bombs go off at several Basque companies offices. A total of 6 bombs exploded in the towns San Sebastián, Irun and Lazkao.
- August 29: People's Party councillor Manuel Indiano Azaustre is shot dead inside his sweet shop in Zumárraga, Gipuzkoa.
- September 10: A bomb explodes in a discothèque in Itziar, Gipuzkoa, causing great damage to the building. No one was injured.
- September 14: Former Socialist politician José Ramón Recalde survives after being shot in the head in San Sebastian.
- September 16: Police defuse eight grenade launchers in Hernani, Gipuzkoa where King Juan Carlos, José María Aznar and German Chancellor Gerhard Schroder were visiting a local museum.
- September 21: People's Party councillor Jose Luis Ruiz Casado is shot dead in Sant Adrià del Besòs, Barcelona.
- October 7: Police safely explode a bomb placed under the car of a Spanish officer in Seville.
- October 8: Police safely explode another bomb placed under the car of a Spanish officer in Seville.
- October 9: Police defuse a bomb placed inside the car of a Spanish officer in Seville. That same day, judge Luis Portero is shot dead in Granada.
- October 16: Military doctor Antonio Muñoz Cariñanos is shot dead in his office in Seville.
- October 21: Police safely defuse a bomb attached to the car of Juan Antonio Gallastegui, politician linked to Electronic Arts.
- October 22: A car bomb explodes in Vitoria, killing prison official Máximo Casado Carrera. Later that day, lawyer José María Muguruza Velilla received a parcel bomb at his home in San Sebastian, which was later defused by police.
- October 30: A car bomb loaded with 20 kg of explosive goes off in the center of Madrid, killing Supreme Court judge Francisco Querol Lombardero. 3 other people died in the explosion, including a bus driver hit by the blast. 64 other people were injured in ETA's deadliest attack in years.
- November 2: A car bomb explodes at the Avinguda Diagonal avenue in Barcelona, injuring a security officer and a municipal officer.
- November 10: A bomb fails to go off in front of the house of two journalists, Aurora Intxausti and Juan Palomo, in San Sebastian.
- November 11: A booby trap bomb explodes outside a police barracks in San Sebastian, injuring 10 police officers.
- November 21: Former Socialist health minister Ernest Lluch is shot dead in a Barcelona car park. Earlier that day, a bomb had caused great damage to an estate agency in Guernica, Biscay and grenades had been thrown at a Civil Guard barracks in Irún. One of the grenades injured a policeman and another hit a children's school. Police defused a car bomb next to the barracks.
- December 5: Police defuse a bomb placed in front of a court house in Eibar, Gipuzkoa.
- December 14: A car bomb explodes in Viladecavalls, Barcelona, killing People's Party councillor Francisco Cano Consuegra.
- December 18: ETA tries to kill a professor by placing a bomb inside an elevator at the University of the Basque Country in Lejona, Biscay.
- December 20: A municipal police officer is shot dead in the center of Barcelona.
- December 27: A bomb explodes in a social security office in San Sebastian. No one was injured.
- December 31: A car loaded with 160 kg of dynamite is defused by police in Seville after a warning call from ETA.

==== 2001 ====
- January 9: A bomb fails to explode in Zarautz, Gipuzkoa when Partido Popular members were paying tribute to a councillor killed by ETA.
- January 10: Two 6 kg (13 lb) backpack bombs explode in the city of Girona. No one was injured but there was great damage to a government building.
- January 15: A small bomb goes off outside an Ertzaintza-related union office in Bilbao.
- January 20: Two homemade bombs explode outside the houses of two Ertzaintza officers in Bilbao. No one was injured.
- January 22: Civil Guard officers deactivate a massive car bomb placed by ETA in Getxo, Biscay.
- January 24: Police defuse a bomb placed by ETA under the car of a Spanish army worker in Zizur Mayor, Navarre.
- January 26: A car bomb in a suburb of San Sebastian kills a navy cook and injures two people.
- January 31: Two Civil Guards escape death after a bomb targeted at them explodes in Pasaia, Gipuzkoa. No one was injured.
- February 3: A post office in San Sebastián is destroyed by the throwing of dozens of molotov cocktails.
- February 12: A car bomb loaded with 40 kg (88 lb) of dynamite fails to explode in Madrid. According to Spanish press, the attack was targeted at an important almirant of the Spanish army.
- February 18: The son and wife of a Socialist councillor in Getxo, Biscay are slightly injured after molotov cocktails are thrown at their house.
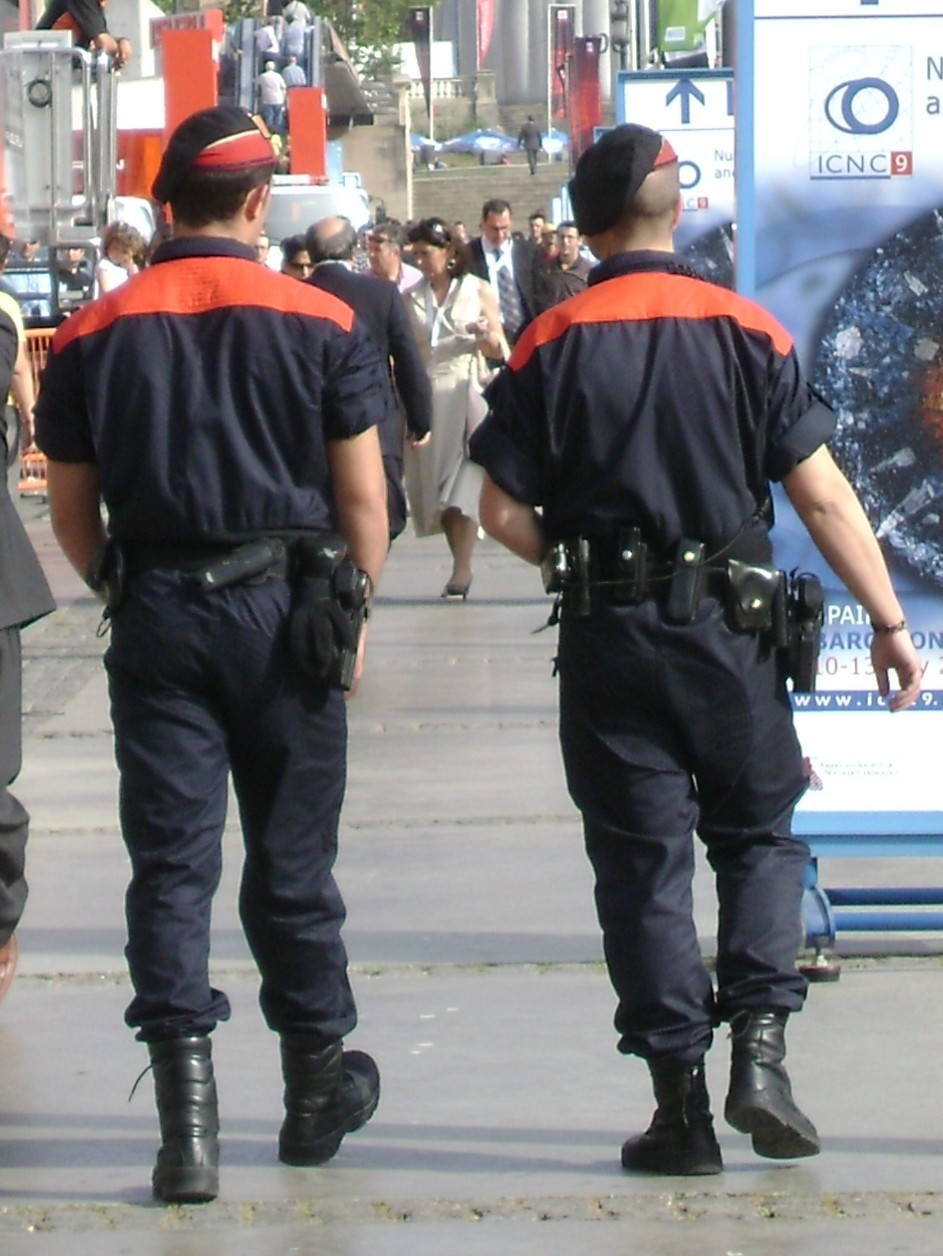
  The March 17 car bomb was the first and last time that ETA killed a Catalan policeman
- February 22: Two commuting electrical workers are killed by a car bomb explosion in San Sebastián. The blast seriously injured the supposed target, a Socialist town councillor. Three other people were also injured. That same day, the suspected head of the ETA commandos, Txapote, was arrested in France.
- February 23: Three bombs explode inside a local youth office in the town of Zumárraga, Gipuzkoa. The devices caused minor damage to the building.
- February 28: Police deactivate a bomb in Cintruénigo, Navarre. The same day, a bomb explodes inside a post office in Hernani, Gipuzkoa. No one was injured.
- March 9: ETA members stole more than 1.6 tons of explosives and 20,000 detonators from a warehouse in the French city of Grenoble, Isère.
- March 10: A car bomb kills an Ertzaintza officer in Hernani. Hours later, a bomb went off at a post office in Beasain, Gipuzkoa. No one was injured.
- March 17: A car bomb in front of a hotel in Roses, Girona kills a Mossos d'Esquadra police officer. 3 other people were injured.
- March 18: Police safely detonate a car bomb in Gandia, Valencia. The blast caused great damage to a nearby hotel.
- March 20: ETA gunmen kill the deputy mayor of Lasarte-Oria, Gipuzkoa and member of the Socialist party Froilán Elespe Inciarte.
- March 28: Two bombs are detonated on the steps of Tolosa and Azpeitia court houses, both in Gipuzkoa. No one was injured.
- April 1: A homemade bomb explodes in the court house of Abadiño, Biscay. No one was injured.
- April 15: A bomb explodes at the house of a UPN councillor of Villava, Navarre. No one was injured.
- April 21: A 4 kg (8.8 lb) bomb explodes in front of the house of two Partido Popular councillors for the towns of Hondarribia and Irun, both in Gipuzkoa.
- May 2: Ertzaina safely detonates a bomb found in an industrial park in Urnieta, Gipuzkoa.
- May 6: Senior Popular Party member Manuel Jimenez Abad is shot dead in Zaragoza.
- May 12: A car bomb explodes in front of a bank headquarters in Madrid, injuring 13 people. The blast caused great damage to the area.
- May 15: A journalist is injured after opening a letter bomb sent to his home in Zarautz, Gipuzkoa.
- May 19: A bomb exploded at the house of a Socialist party member in Vitoria. No one was injured.
- May 23: Police defuse a bomb placed under the car of a security guard of the University of the Basque Country.
- May 24: Santiago Oleaga Elejabarrieta, the officer of newspaper El Diario Vasco is shot dead in San Sebastián.
- June 3: At least fifty hooded people in Bergara place homemade bombs, flaming bombs and throwing rockets and molotov cocktails. No one was injured.
- June 7: A small bomb explodes near a Peugeot car dealership in San Sebastian.
- June 10: A car bomb loaded with 40 kg of dynamite goes off in Logroño, injuring two people and causing great damage.
- June 16: Ertzaina police officers defuse a bomb placed in a Socialist party office in Elgoibar, Gipuzkoa.
- June 21: A powerful car bomb explodes in front of a bank headquarters in San Sebastian, following a warning call from ETA. The explosion heavily damaged the building, but caused no injuries.
- June 28: A parcel bomb placed on a bicycle explodes in Madrid, injuring at least 10 people, including a retired general who died one month later.
- July 10: A 40 kg (88 lb) car bomb explodes in the center of Madrid, killing a police officer and injuring 12 people.
- July 14: A van bomb explodes in Leiza, Navarre, killing Navarrese People's Union councillor Jose Javier Múgica. Hours later, an Ertzaintza officer is shot dead in Leaburu.
- July 24: An ETA militant accidentally blows herself up in Torrevieja, Alicante. The blast injured seven people.
- July 26: Police defuse a car bomb with 53 kilograms (117 lb) of explosive at the airport of Málaga.
- July 27: A powerful homemade bomb explodes in front of the house of a senior Spanish lieutenant in Vitoria. No one was injured.
- August 3: A small bomb explodes on a railway track in La Roda, Albacete. No one was injured.
- August 5: Two Ertzaintza officers are injured in Portugalete after being attacked with Molotov cocktails and stones.
- August 15: Two dynamite bombs explode on a high-speed railway track in Ciudad Real. That same day, a homemade bomb exploded in front of an Ertzaintza officer house in San Sebastián.
- August 16: Police defused two bombs placed in front of a bank headquarters in San Sebastian.
- August 18: A massive car bomb explodes near a hotel in Salou, Tarragona. No one was injured.
- August 27: A car bomb loaded with 50 kilograms (110 lb) of explosive goes off on the second floor of Terminal 2 Madrid-Barajas Airport car park, causing only material damage.
- September 2: A home-made bomb explodes in an electronics store owned by an officer of the Ertzaintza in Vitoria. No one was injured.
- September 18: A bomb explodes in front of a social security office in San Sebastian. No one was injured.
- September 28: A 30 kg (66 lb) bomb explodes inside a discothèque in Lacunza, Navarre. No one was injured, after a warning call from ETA.
- October 1: A car bomb loaded with 40 kg of explosive goes off in front of a court house in Vitoria, injuring one person.
- October 12: A car bomb explodes in Madrid, injuring 12 people. The bomb, which exploded at night, was supposed to go off during a military parade that morning.
- November 6: A car bomb explodes loaded with 25 kg (55 lb) of explosive goes off in Madrid, injuring 100 people. The bomb was targeted at Juan Junquera, secretary general of the Spain's scientific police, who was only slightly injured. The blast also caused great damage around the area.
- November 7: Judge Jose Maria Lidón Corbi is shot dead in Getxo.
- November 20: Two Ertzaintza officers are injured as they tried to remove a booby-trapped banner with a pro-ETA slogan in Bilbao.
- November 23: Two Ertzaintza officers are shot dead in Beasain, Gipuzkoa.
- December 1: Two bombs explode in industrial parks of Arrankudiaga and Amorebieta, both in Biscay.
- December 28: A 5 kg (11 lb) bomb explodes in front of a telecommunications provider building in Arrigorriaga, Biscay. No one was injured.

==== 2002 ====
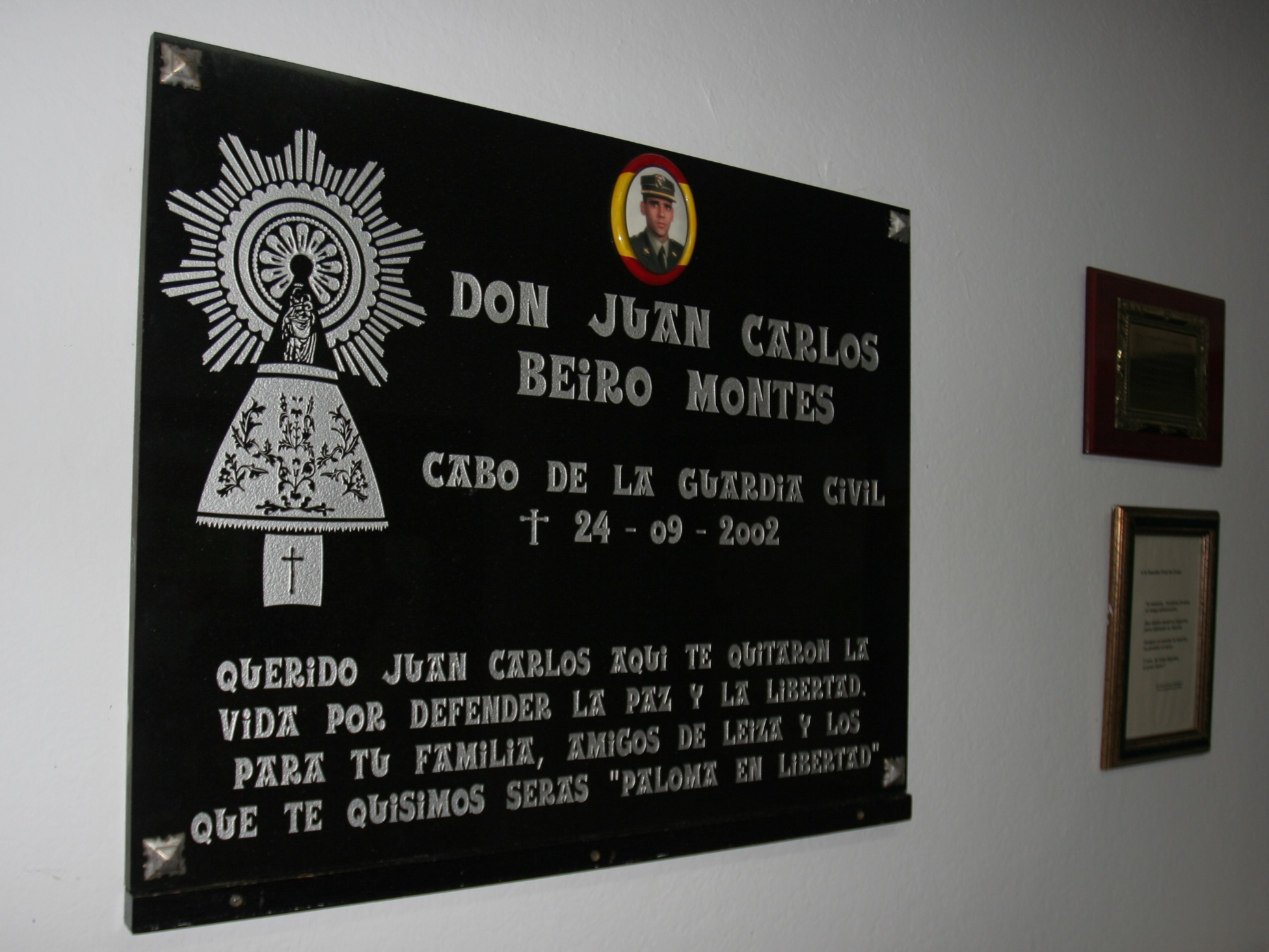
A plaque to Beiro Montes.

- January 12: ETA sets off a car bomb carried with 15–20 kg of explosive in a Shopping mall in Bilbao which caused no injured but great damage. The organization made a warning call to newspaper Gara just 15 minutes before the blast. Later that day, a bomb exploded in a house owned by an Ertzainta in the neighborhood of Añorga, San Sebastian without causing any injuries.
- August 4: Car bomb explodes outside the Civil Guard's casa cuartel in Santa Pola and kills two people, a six-year-old girl and a 54-year-old man, and injuring 40 people.
- August 9: The 2002 Torrevieja bombing. ETA placed an explosive in the toilets of a hamburger restaurant, located a few meters from a tourist office, the Alicante town of Torrevieja. No one died or was injured, although it caused serious material damage.
- September 24: bomb planted at the Civil Guard post on Navarrese-Gipuzkoan border near Berasategi kills Juan Carlos Beiro Montes, head of the Leitza Guardia Civil unit.

==== 2003 ====
- February 8: A senior police officer is shot dead in the town of Andoain, Gipuzkoa.
- February 18: A 6 kg bomb placed in front of an Ertzaintza police officer house in Murueta, Biscay is defused by police.
- May 30: A car bomb explodes in Sangüesa, Navarre, killing two police officers and injuring 2 people.
- June 14: A car bomb loaded with 30 kg of explosive is defused by police in Bilbao.
- June 19: A 5 kg bomb explodes in a power transmitter in Iurreta, Biscay. No one was injured.
- June 23: A powerful bomb explodes in a hotel in Getxo, Biscay after a warning call from ETA. No one was injured, but the hotel was heavily damaged.
- July 1: A car bomb loaded with 15 kg of explosive is defused by police in Bilbao. The attack was a failed attempt to kill police officers with booby traps.
- July 6: A bomb goes off in front of a transportation company in Bedia, Biscay. No one was injured.
- July 13: Police defuse a bomb placed by ETA inside a hotel in Pamplona.
- July 22: Two bombs explode in hotels in the cities of Alicante and Benidorm, injuring 13 people, among them police officers and foreign tourists.
- July 24: A bomb goes off in front of a court house in Estella, Navarre. 1 person was injured.
- July 27: A car bomb exploded in a parking lot at Santander Airport. No one was injured after a warning call from ETA.
- July 31: A 5 kg bomb placed in front of a transportation company in Azkoitia, Gipuzkoa is defused by police. Hours later, a bomb explodes in a car dealership in Lejona, Biscay. No one was injured.
- August 14: Police defuse a 20 kg rucksack bomb in Briviesca, Burgos. A passer-by had spotted a suspicious package and called police.
- September 14: ETA members ambush two Ertzaintza police officers in an Álava road after faking a car accident. An ETA member died during a shootout with the officers.
- October 12: Two bombs explode in Irun, Gipuzkoa causing great damage but no injuries.
- October 18: An army barracks in Aizoáin, Navarre is hit by two grenades. None of them exploded.
- December 23: A small bomb placed under a railway track in Zaragoza explodes, causing minor damage to a train.
- December 24: ETA attempts to blow 50 kg of explosives inside Madrid's busy Chamartín Station on Christmas Eve. Police thwarted the attempt when they stopped an ETA member trying to load 28 kg of explosives into a Madrid-bound train in San Sebastián. Another bomb with over 20 kg of explosives was then found inside a second train passing near Burgos, on its way to Madrid.
- December 26: Police defuse a 2 kg bomb placed by ETA under a railway track in Samper de Calanda, Teruel.

==== 2004 ====
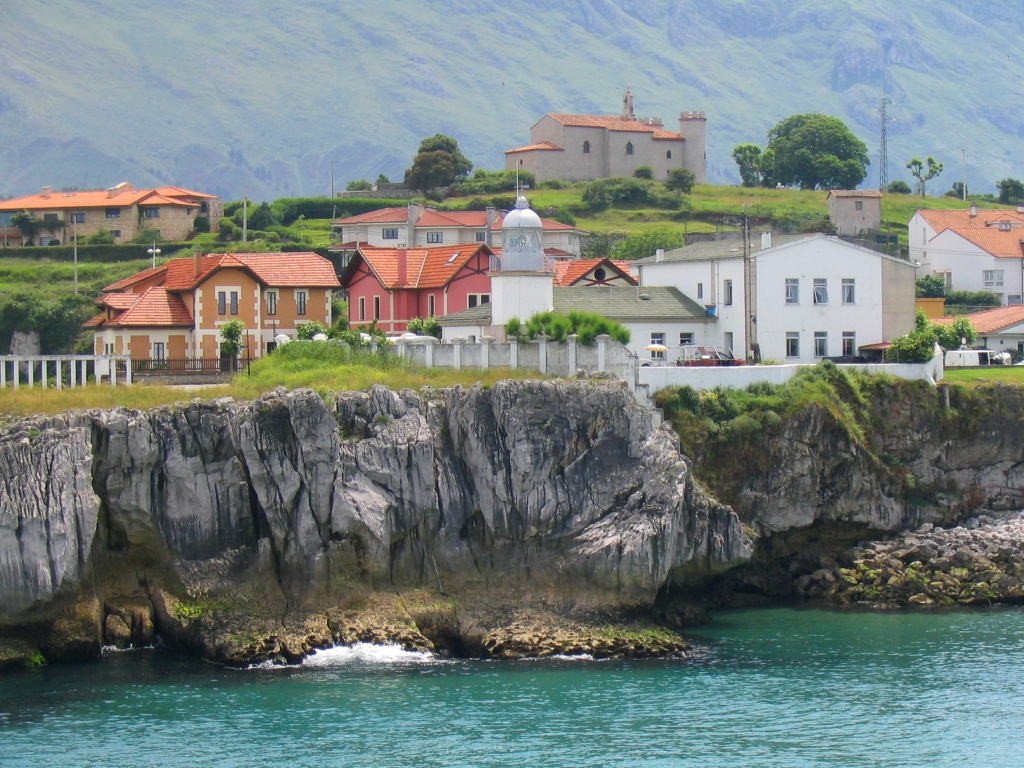
ETA usually attacked the north of Spain with small bombs during its summer campaigns. In the picture, Llanes.

- August 7: Two small bombs planted by ETA explode in San Vicente de la Barquera (Cantabria) and Ribadesella (Asturias). No one was injured.
- August 12: Two bombs exploded in the cities of Gijón and Santander, injuring one person.
- August 15: A small bomb goes off in Llanes (Asturias) without causing injuries.
- August 21: Two ETA bombs go off in the towns of Sanxenxo and Baiona (Galicia), injuring three people.
- August 28: ETA plants two bombs in the Galician cities of Santiago de Compostela and A Coruña. The second bomb failed to explode.
- September 15: A small bomb planted by ETA goes off in an electricity substation in the town of Irún. No one was injured.
- September 27: ETA militants send a videotape to Gara, a Basque newspaper based in Gipuzkoa, in which the militants state that ETA would continue to fight for Basque self-determination and that ETA would "respond with arms against those who deny us through the force of arms." This videotape represented ETA's first major public statement since the 11 March Madrid train bombings.
- December 3: ETA had bombs in 5 petrol stations in the Madrid area. Due to a telephoned warning, the areas were evacuated and no one was injured.
- December 6: On Spanish Constitution Day, ETA detonated seven bombs in bars, cafes and town squares across Spain.
- December 12: The Real Madrid Santiago Bernabéu stadium football Stadium was evacuated due to a phone-in bomb threat on behalf of ETA. The bomb—expected to blow up at 9:00 p.m.—does not explode, and the 69,000 spectators of the match are safely evacuated by the Spanish Police at 8:45 p.m.

==== 2005 ====
- February 9: ETA exploded a car with 30 kg of chlorate. The car was placed to the side of the building of Steria Iberica and Bull España, in Madrid. The blast resulted in 42 people with minor injuries.
- February 27: A small bomb exploded at a resort hotel in Villajoyosa after a telephoned warning. The building was evacuated and no one was injured. The explosion damaged only a small house near the residence's swimming pool.
- September 24: ETA suspected of a car bomb attack in the northern Spanish province of Avila.
- November 19: ETA claimed responsibility for attacks on five business in the Basque region for "refusing to provide financial aid for Basque Freedom." Businesses affected by the bombings were La Rioja Alta SL Distributor of Haro, Beistegui Hermanos, El Coto de Rioja, Transport Azkar, and Angulas Anuinaga. No injuries were reported.
- December 6: On Spanish Constitution Day, ETA detonated five bombs along Madrid highways. No injuries were reported. Also, in northern Spain, Santander Airport was closed following a threat of an attack using grenade launchers.
- December 18: ETA detonated a bomb inside an eel cannery in Irura, Gipuzkoa. No injuries were reported although the cannery suffered extensive damage. The police reports that the bombing is part of an extensive extortion campaign of ETA to Basque business owners.
- December 21: ETA detonated a bomb inside a van in the back alley of a nightclub in Santesteban, Navarre. No injuries were reported. The nightclub suffered extensive structural damages and some buildings around it suffered damages too.

==== 2006 ====
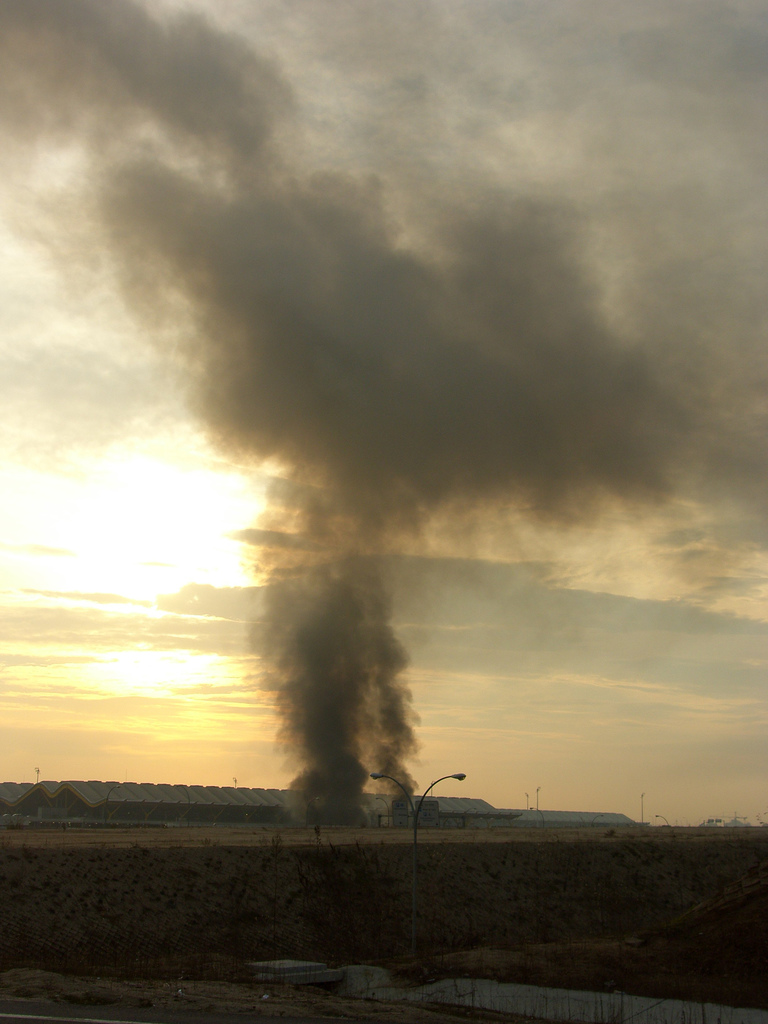
Madrid Barajas Airport Bombing

- January 5: Two small 6 kg bombs exploded at a hotel in the village of Sos del Rey Católico, Zaragoza causing only minor damage and no injuries.
- January 7: A small bomb planted by ETA goes off in an electricity substation in the town of Borau, Huesca. No one was injured.
- January 22: A bomb explodes in a party office owned by Spanish Socialist Workers' Party (PSOE) in the town of Nanclares de la Oca, causing damage only to the building.
- January 26: ETA detonates a 10 kg bomb beside the court of justice of Balmaseda and another 5 kg one in the premises of Correos postal service in Etxebarri, both in Biscay, causing material damages and no personal injuries.
- January 29: A rucksack packed with explosives next to a job centre in Santutxu, Bilbao went off. One policeman was injured in the attack.
- February 1: After a warning call from ETA, a bomb goes off in a postal office in Etxebarri (Biscay).
- February 14: A car bomb loaded with 40 kg of explosive went off at a discothèque in Urdax, Navarre, causing damage but no injuries as police had cleared the area after a warning call from ETA.
- February 16: A bomb explodes in an industrial area in Trapagaran, Biscay, after a warning call from ETA. No one was injured in the attack.
- February 22: A bomb explodes in an industrial park near Bilbao. The bomb caused damage to many buildings.
- February 26: Two people are injured when a bomb exploded in a bank cash machine in the city of Vitoria.
- February 27: A bomb placed exploded at a courthouse in town of Mungia, Biscay. A passer-by spotted a suspicious package and called police. The bomb exploded before they were able to clear off the area and injured one policeman.
- February 28: A bomb exploded outside a labour ministry building in the town of Mutriku, Gipuzkoa. No one was injured.
- March 7: ETA detonated a bomb outside the offices of the fascist Spanish Falange organisation in Santoña, Cantabria. One man was injured. That same day two bombs exploded in two banks in .Plentzia. No one was injured.
- March 5: Following the February deaths of two ETA members Igor Miguel Angulo Iturrate, aged 32, (due to an apparent suicide by hanging) and Ricardo Sainz Olmos, aged 41, (as a result of an apparent heart attack), Batasuna together with the union Langile Abertzaleen Batzordeak call a day of protest and general strike in the Basque Country on March 9. On the morning of the strike, ETA detonates several bombs near highways, causing no injuries.
- March 22: ETA declares a "permanent ceasefire" that started on 24 March 2006 at 00:00 (23:00GMT).
- December 30: A van bomb containing 500 to 800 kilograms explodes at terminal T4 of Madrid-Barajas Airport. Two Ecuadorian immigrants (Diego Armando Estacio Civizapa and Carlos Alonso Palate), who were napping inside their cars in the parking garage were killed, and 26 others were injured. The low casualties were due to police intervention.
- March 5: One civilian was kidnapped in armed attack by ETA near Saint-Jean-de-Luz, in the Basque province of Labourd (Lapurdi), France. On December 30, the victim was released by his captors.

==== 2007 ====
- June 5: ETA announces that the ceasefire is over.
- July 25: Two small bombs explode along the Tour de France route in just outside the small town of Belagua, Navarre, Spain. No one was injured.
- August 24: A van bomb explodes in front of Civil Guard's cuartel in Durango, Biscay, injuring 2 Civil Guard officers.
- August 24: Three civilians including one child were kidnapped by suspected ETA militants in the tourist town of Messanges in the Landes department in Nouvelle-Aquitaine in south-western France.
- August 25: A van bomb explodes in an olive grove in Castellón. No one was injured. The van was supposed to be used for an attack in Valencia.
- September 2: A small bomb explodes in Fuenmayor, La Rioja. No one was injured.
- September 11: A massive car bomb fails to go off outside regional Defense ministry in Logroño.
- September 24: A 5 kg bomb explodes in front of an Ertzaintza police station in Zarautz, Gipuzkoa. No one was injured.
- October 9: A car bomb explodes in the La Pena area of Bilbao, injuring one.
- December 1: Two Civil Guards are shot dead in the French town of Capbreton, Aquitaine.
- December 24: A bomb explodes in front of a Socialist party office in Balmaseda, Biscay. No one was injured.

==== 2008 ====
- February 8: Two backpack bombs each loaded with 15 kg of explosive go off in front of a courthouse in Bergara, Gipuzkoa.
- February 23: Following a warning call an 8 kg bomb explodes in a TV transmitter station on the outskirts of Bilbao. Another bomb was hidden in the area, targeted at policemen.
- February 29: A bomb explodes in a Socialist party office in the town of Derio, Biscay. No one was injured.
- March 7: An ETA gunman kills Isaías Carrasco, former town councillor for Mondragón, Gipuzkoa two days before the General Elections.
- March 21: A car bomb explodes outside a Civil Guard barracks in Calahorra, Rioja, injuring one policeman lightly and causing extensive property damage.
- March 30: Two small bombs exploded near Azpeitia, Gipuzkoa with minor damage near a television transmitter. No one was injured.
- April 12: A small bomb explodes in a television transmitter in Lapoblación, Navarre. No one was injured.
- April 17: A powerful bomb explodes outside the office of Spanish Socialist party in Bilbao, causing serious damage to the building and injuries to 7 Ertzaintza officers.
- April 19: A bomb explodes in front of an office of the Socialist party in Elgoibar, Gipuzkoa. No one was injured in the attack, which caused great damage to the building.
- May 1: On the International Workers' Day, three bombs explode in labour institutions offices in San Sebastian and Arrigorriaga, Biscay.
- May 12: Two small bombs damage construction equipment in a construction site in Hernani, Gipuzkoa for the region's new Basque Y high-speed train network.
- May 14: A van bomb explodes in a Civil Guard barracks in Legutiano, Álava, killing one policeman and injuring 4.
- May 19: A car bomb explodes in Getxo, Biscay. A boat club suffered great damage, but no one was injured after a warning call from ETA.
- June 1: A powerful bomb explodes in the headquarters of a construction company in Zarautz, Gipuzkoa. Two people were slightly injured.
- June 8: A 5 kg bomb explodes at the presses of newspaper El Correo in Zamudio, Biscay. There was no warning call, but no one was injured.
- July 4: A bomb explodes in a television transmitter in Urdingain, Álava. No one was injured.
- July 20: Five small bombs exploded in the seaside towns of Laredo and Noja in Cantabria. One person was injured. Earlier that day, a bomb exploded in a bank office in Getxo, Biscay. No one was injured.
- July 28: A small bomb explodes at a highway building site in Orio, Gipuzkoa. No one was injured.
- July 29: A bomb goes off in the beach resort of Torremolinos, Málaga. No one was injured.
- August 17: Two small bombs explode in the beach resorts of Guadalmar and Benalmádena, both in Málaga. A third bomb, placed under a bridge, was defused by police. No one was injured.
- September 21: A car bomb explodes next to a bank headquarters in Vitoria. No one was injured. Hours later, another car bomb exploded in front of an Ertzaintza station in Ondarroa, injuring 11 people.
- September 22: A car bomb goes off outside a military residence in Santoña, Cantabria, killing a Spanish officer and injuring 7 people.
- October 4: A 5 kg rucksack bomb explodes in a courthouse in Tolosa, Gipuzkoa. No one was injured in the attack, which damaged the building.
- October 25: A powerful bomb explodes in a train station in Berriz, Biscay. Another train station in Amorebieta was also attacked that day. Police blamed the attacks on ETA related groups. No one was injured.
- October 30: A powerful car bomb explodes at the University of Navarra in Pamplona, Navarre. 21 people were injured in the attack.
- November 20: A bomb explodes in a television transmitter in Bilbao. No one was injured.
- December 3: ETA gunmen kill businessman Ignacio Uría Mendizábal in Azpeitia, Gipuzkoa. Uría's company was working on the Basque Y.
- December 31: A van bomb with 100 kg of explosives exploded in front of the Basque public broadcaster EITB in Bilbao following a warning call from ETA.

==== 2009 ====
- January 16: A bomb went off in the early hours of the morning at a TV repeater station at Hernani, Gipuzkoa. The Basque Government reported no injuries in the blast at 1am, and that the material damage was still being evaluated. Hours later it was discovered it was a failed attempt to kill police officers with booby traps. Two other bombs, which weighed 10 and 4 kilograms respectively, had been hidden near the access road to the booster station. Cables reaching the road would have set the explosives off had anyone stepped on them. A third bomb was also found.
- February 4: Police found an ETA car carried with a small amount of explosives in the Spanish city of Salamanca. Police suspect activists wanted to explode the car in order to remove their fingerprints. The find came one day after police found an arms cache in the Basque Country where agents carried out a controlled explosion on site in order to prevent a possible booby trap.
- February 7: Kale borroka (youth groups linked to ETA) attacks again: a bus is burnt in the Northern city of Amurrio and a small explosion destroys a train in Errentería (Gipuzkoa).
- February 9: A powerful van bomb planted by ETA exploded near a trade fair complex in northeast Madrid. Local news reports said no one was killed or injured and that the Red Cross had received a warning call from ETA. The explosion of the van left a crater one metre (three feet) deep and damaged more than 30 vehicles, a police statement said. It was heard throughout the district. The attack followed the decision by the Spanish Supreme Court to exclude two Basque political parties ("Demokrazia Hiru Milloi" and "Askatasuna") from the regional elections which were held three weeks later. The two parties are said to have connections with ETA.
- February 21: A Basque Nationalist Party batzoki in Cruces/Gurutzeta, Barakaldo is damaged after a bomb exploded at 00:10 in front of the building. No injuries were reported in an attack similar to others carried out by youth groups linked to ETA. Minutes later another office in San Sebastian was also attacked with a small fire.
- February 23: Two bombs exploded in the Basque Country in less than 24 hours.
  - A rucksack packed with around 10 kg worth of explosives explodes outside the Basque Socialist Party headquarters in Lazkao, Gipuzkoa after a warning call from ETA. The blast took place at 03:00, causing major damage to the local but no injuries were reported. Two hours before some molotov cocktail were thrown at two banks in Tolosa, Gipuzkoa.
  - Another bomb explodes in front of a batzoki in Gasteiz minutes before midnight causing minimal damage to the building. Police again blamed youth groups linked to ETA for the bomb.
- March 1: Molotov cocktail attacks on a court and several banks in the town of Amorebieta. The attacks caused minor damage and no injuries.
- March 26: A bomb carried with 2 kg of explosive device is detonated in Amorebieta, Biscay suspected to be the work of ETA. The explosion caused minor damage but no fatalities or injuries. The bomb was planted on the wall that surrounds a businessman's chalet. The unidentified businessman is on a list of individuals who are "at risk" of being targeted by ETA.
- May 6: Two bombs at booster stations in Castro Urdiales, Cantabria caused material damage and no injuries. A nearby school had to be evacuated.
- June 19: A car bomb explodes in Arrigorriaga near Bilbao, Biscay, killing an officer of the Policía Nacional. Though no claims were made, it is suspected to be the handiwork of ETA. It is the first attack since lehendakari Patxi López assumed office on May 7, 2009.
- July 10: After the arrest of three top ETA members, a powerful bomb explodes in a Spanish Socialist Workers' Party local office in Durango, causing extensive damage to the building and the surroundings. No one was injured or killed in the attack.
- July 29: A car bomb exploded outside a Guardia Civil barracks in the Northern Spanish city of Burgos. The attack injured 65 people, including women and children, and caused the collapse of the building's facade. ETA's claimed responsibility for the attack some days later, although confirmed they made several warning calls to police, something that the Spanish government denies.
- July 30: A car bomb exploded outside a Guardia Civil office in Calvià, Mallorca, killing two members of the Guardia Civil, Carlos Sáenz de Tejada and Diego Salva Lezaun. ETA was blamed for the attack and the authorities 'sealed' all entry and exit points to the island to stop the bombers' escape. Another explosive device was found under a policeman's car in the same town some hours later and deactivated by police.
- August 9: Four bombs exploded at a bars, restaurants and shopping area in the capital of Mallorca following a telephone call from ETA warning of imminent blasts in Palma. Government sources said the blasts caused minor injuries though nobody was seriously hurt. The explosives were planted on the same day of the Calvià attack.
- October 16: After the arrest by the Spanish government of several Basque politicians, a bus, several cars and three banks are attacked by petrol bombs in the northern cities of Bilbao and Ondarroa. The attacks were blamed on the kale borroka, youth groups related to ETA.
- November 27: A bomb explodes inside a Getxo metro station. The blast took place at 2:40am and heavily damaged the building. Minutes before a bus was attacked and destroyed in Markina, Biscay. The previous day an explosive device went off in front of a local newspaper office in Pamplona. The attacks came hours after the arrest of 34 youth Basques by the Spanish police forces.

==== 2010 ====
- February 17: A small bomb goes off in front of an employment institute office in Vitoria.
- March 16: An officer of the French Police Nationale is killed in a shootout with ETA members in Dammarie-lès-Lys, near Paris.
- April 12: 14 train stations around Gipuzkoa and Biscay are attacked by groups of young independentists.
- April 16: A small bomb exploded at an agency of Telefonica in Llodio. Groups linked to ETA were blamed.
- May 9: Two small explosive devices explode in the home of a judge and a security guard in San Sebastián.
- June 23: ETA said it had planted four bombs to roads and railways in the city of Valencia. No bombs were found.
- August: Violence spreads along the Basque Country after a series of coordinated kale borroka attacks. Several trash containers and a building are burnt in Ondarroa on August 7, dozens of trash containers are burnt in the town of Zarautz on August 11 leaving two police officers injured, a petrol bomb is thrown at a post office in Zalla on August 13, two trucks working on a TAV-related project are burnt and destroyed in Andoain on August 16, several trash containers are burnt in the cities of Azkoitia and Vitoria on August 17, more trash containers are burnt in Vitoria on August 18, eight trash containers and several cars are burnt in the city of Bilbao and petrol bombs are thrown in Amorebieta on August 20. An explosive device went off in Bilbao on August 21.
- September 16: A small bomb goes off in an industrial zone of Vitoria, causing damage but no injuries. It is believed to be a kale borroka attack, youth groups linked to ETA.
- December 20: A commando of ETA hides about 7,000 smart cards and plastic supports format card, and seven specialized printers and several printing software in a business located in Bourg-de-Péage in France.

==== 2011 ====
- April 9: An officer of the Police Nationale is shot by two members of ETA who refused to stop at a police checkpoint in the town of Valliere, Limousin. Another shoot-out followed the first incident, without injuring anyone. The two members were arrested the following day after another gunbattle. No one was injured.
