= List of terrorist incidents in 1980 =

This is a timeline of incidents in 1980 that have been labelled as "terrorism" and are not believed to have been carried out by a government or its forces (see state terrorism and state-sponsored terrorism).

== Guidelines ==
- To be included, entries must be notable (have a stand-alone article) and described by a consensus of reliable sources as "terrorism".
- List entries must comply with the guidelines outlined in the manual of style under MOS:TERRORIST.
- Casualty figures in this list are the total casualties of the incident including immediate casualties and later casualties (such as people who succumbed to their wounds long after the attacks occurred).
- Casualties listed are the victims. Perpetrator casualties are listed separately (e.g. x (+y) indicate that x victims and y perpetrators were killed/injured).
- Casualty totals may be underestimated or unavailable due to a lack of information. A figure with a plus (+) sign indicates that at least that many people have died (e.g. 10+ indicates that at least 10 people have died) – the actual toll could be considerably higher. A figure with a plus (+) sign may also indicate that over that number of people are victims.
- If casualty figures are 20 or more, they will be shown in **bold**. In addition, figures for casualties more than 50 will also be **underlined**.
- Incidents are limited to one per location per day. If multiple attacks occur in the same place on the same day, they will be merged into a single incident.
- In addition to the guidelines above, the table also includes the following categories:

0 people were killed/injured by the incident.
1–19 people were killed/injured by the incident.
20–49 people were killed/injured by the incident.
50–99 people were killed/injured by the incident.
100+ people were killed/injured by the incident.

== List ==
Date	Type	Dead	Injured	Location	Details	Perpetrator	Part of
17 January	Bombing	3	5	Dunmurry, Northern Ireland	An incendiary bomb planted on a train by the Provisional IRA prematurely detonated and set the train on fire, killing 3 and wounding 5.	Provisional IRA	The Troubles
20 January	Bombing	4	10	Alonsotegi, Spain	A Spanish unionist paramilitary called the Grupos Armados Españoles bombed a bar that was known as a meeting place for Basque nationalists.	Grupos Armados Españoles	Basque conflict
25 January	Siege	5	5	Pretoria, South Africa	Silverton Bank Siege: members of an Umkhonto we Sizwe (MK) unit were confronted by the police while "on their way to carry out a mission". They entered a bank where they held customers hostage. This was followed by a shoot-out with the police in which two civilians and the three MK operatives were killed.	Umkhonto we Sizwe	Internal resistance to apartheid
1 February	Shooting, grenade	6 (+2 attackers)	0	Ispaster, Spain	Basque group ETA kills 6 Civil Guards in a gun and grenade attack. 2 ETA members are killed by grenades they threw.	ETA	Basque conflict
27 February – 27 April	Siege	1 (an attacker)	5	Bogotá, Colombia	17 members of the 19th of April Movement held 60 hostages at the Dominican embassy for 2 months before escaping to Cuba. The only fatality was a young militant killed by police on the first day of the siege.	M-19	Colombian conflict
7–8 April	Shooting, hostage-taking	3 (+5 attackers)	16	Misgav Am, Israel	Five Palestinian terrorists from the Iraqi-backed Arab Liberation Front penetrated Kibbutz Misgav Am at night and entered the nursery. They killed the kibbutz secretary and an infant boy. They held the rest of the children hostage, demanding the release of about 50 terrorists held in Israeli prisons. The first raid of an IDF infantry unit was unsuccessful, but a second attempt, a few hours later, succeeded, and all the terrorists were killed. Two kibbutz members and one soldier were killed, four children and 11 soldiers were injured.	Arab Liberation Front	Israeli–Palestinian conflict
30 April – 5 May	Shooting	5	2	London, England	The Iranian Embassy siege took place after six armed men stormed the Iranian embassy in South Kensington. The gunmen, members of an Iranian Arab group campaigning for Arab national sovereignty in the southern region of Khuzestan, took 26 people hostage—mostly embassy staff, but also several visitors as well as a police officer who had been guarding the embassy. They demanded the release of Arab prisoners from prisons in Iran and their own safe passage out of the United Kingdom. Prime Minister Margaret Thatcher's government quickly resolved that safe passage would not be granted, and a siege ensued. Over the following days, police negotiators secured the release of five hostages in exchange for minor concessions, such as the broadcasting of the hostage-takers' demands on British television. However, a breakdown in negotiations led to the gunmen killing an embassy employee, forcing the government to send in SAS commandos to storm the embassy, rescuing all but one hostage who was killed by the gunmen during the assault and killing five of the six hostage-takers.	Democratic Revolutionary Front for the Liberation of Arabistan	Arab separatism in Khuzestan
13 July	Shooting, ambush	2 (+2 attackers)	3	Orio, Spain	Several members of ETA shoot and ambush a group of Civil Guards, killing two and injuring three. The guards managed to kill two of the attackers.	ETA	Basque conflict
27 July	Grenade	1	20	Antwerp, Belgium	A member of the Abu Nidal Organization throws two hand grenades into a group of Jewish schoolchildren waiting for a bus stop, killing one and wounding twenty. Said Al Nasr was found guilty and sentenced to life in prison.	Said Al Nasr; Abu Nidal Organization	Israeli–Palestinian conflict
31 July	Shooting	2	2	Athens, Greece	Two members of the Armenian Secret Army for the Liberation of Armenia attacked a Turkish family near the Turkish embassy. The father and 14-year-old daughter were killed while the mother and 16-year-old son were seriously wounded.	ASALA	
2 August	Bombing	85	200+	Bologna, Italy	Three members of the neo-fascist group Nuclei Armati Rivoluzionari detonate a time bomb at Bologna Central Station.	Nuclei Armati Rivoluzionari	Anni di piombo
5 August	Shooting	2	11	Lyon, France	Two members of the Armenian Secret Army for the Liberation of Armenia stormed the Turkish Consulate and opened fire, killing a doorman and a French visitor.	ASALA	Terrorism in France
22 August	Bombing	2	3	Hamburg, West Germany	Three members of the neo-Nazi Deutsche Aktionsgruppen attacked a Vietnamese refugee accommodation, killing two men. The attackers and the DA's founder, Manfred Roeder, are tried and given prison sentences.	Deutsche Aktionsgruppen	
20 September	Shooting	4	0	Markina-Xemein, Spain	Four members of Basque separatist group ETA kill four Civil Guards at a bar.	ETA	Basque conflict
26 September	Bombing	12 (+1 attacker)	213	Munich, West Germany	A bomb at the Oktoberfest fairgrounds in Theresienwiese kills 12, including the alleged bomber Gundolf Köhler, a member of the neo-Nazi Military Sport Group Hoffman, and injures 213.	Gundolf Köhler	
3 October	Bombing	4	46	Paris, France	A motorcycle bomb kills four people and injures over forty at the rue Copernic synagogue. Authorities blamed the Popular Front for the Liberation of Palestine..	PFLP	Israeli–Palestinian conflict
20 November	Shooting	5	5	Zarautz, Spain	Two ETA members open fire on Civil Guards in a bar with machine guns. Four guards and a civilian are killed and 5 other people are wounded.	ETA	Basque conflict
31 December	Bombing	20	85	Nairobi, Kenya	At least 15 people were killed and 85 injured in a bombing at the Jewish-owned Norfolk Hotel. The bomber was a member of the Popular Front for the Liberation of Palestine.	PFLP	Israeli–Palestinian conflict

== See also ==
- List of terrorist incidents
