= 1980 Markina attack =

Terrorist incident in Spain

- Part of the Basque conflict
- Location: Markina-Xemein, Spain
- Date: 20 September 1980; 1440 (UTC+2)
- Target: Civil Guards
- Attack type: Mass shooting, gun attack
- Deaths: 4
- Perpetrator: ETA
- No. of participants: 4

The 1980 Markina attack was a mass shooting gun attack by the Basque separatist organisation ETA which occurred on 20 September 1980 near the Basque town of Markina (Spanish: Marquina). The targets were a group of off-duty civil guards who were having lunch in a bar in the town. Four civil guards were killed. The attack was one of the deadliest of 1980, the year when ETA killed more people than any other.

== Background ==
The shootings were the first ETA attack since the Spanish government had survived a vote of confidence and the first since the Basque Nationalist Party had agreed to return to the Spanish parliament after a short dispute. The civil guards who would be killed in the attack were responsible for guarding the Esperanza y Cia Arms factory. Seven months earlier, ETA had ambushed and killed six civil guards who had been guarding weapons in transit from the factory in an attack near Ispaster.

== Attack ==
The bar normally served around 20 customers during lunchtimes and was popular with civil guards, as it was only 200 metres from their barracks in the town. The main entrance was normally closed at lunchtimes after the bar had filled, with a back entrance available for latecomers. At 14:40, only eight people were present in the bar, including two bar workers, two postal workers and the four civil guards, when a man aged around 25 entered the bar and had a drink before leaving. Shortly after, Laura Arrieta Larreate, the 15-year-old daughter of the bar owners, who had been clearing tables, answered a knock at the back door. Three men then entered the bar and, after proceeding quickly to the table where the civil guards were eating, produced machine guns and shot the civil guards in the head and throat. All of the guards were killed instantly. The men then escaped in a car, whose owner was later found bound and gagged near a hill in the town of Elgóibar. His car had been hijacked at gunpoint by four men one hour before the attack. The subsequent forensics sweep of the bar, found numerous shell casings of parabellum ammunition, a type favoured by ETA according to the security forces.

== Arrests and convictions ==
One of those accused of involvement in the attack was Jose Ramón Foruria Zubialdea, alias "Foru," who was accused of supplying information to the Eibar commando unit of ETA, including a plan of the bar. Foru had fled from Spain to Venezuela in 1982 after the arrest of a cousin who he feared might reveal his cooperation with ETA. He was then extradited to Spain in September 2003. Foru admitted having supplied information to ETA but denied involvement in the Markina attack. Found guilty, he was sentenced to forty years in prison. However, he was released in August 2011 on grounds of ill health, suffering from bladder cancer.

In 1984, Jaime Rementería Beotegui was found guilty of participation in the attack, fined 60 million pesetas, and sentenced to prison. Having been in prison since August 1983, he was released in January 2004. Fidel González García, who lent his car to the perpetrators to travel to the area and housed them for several days, before and after the attack, received the same sentence. Two others, Jose Carlos Garcia Ramirez and Angel Maria Recalde Goicoechea, were acquitted in the same trial.
