= 2002 Torrevieja bombing =

Bombing by Basque separatists in Toerrevieja, Spain

- Part of Basque conflict
- Location: Torrevieja, Spain
- Date: 9 August 2002 (UTC+02:00)
- Attack type: Bombing
- Weapon: Bomb
- Deaths: 0
- Injuries: 0
- Perpetrator: ETA

On 9 August 2002, the Basque separatist organization, ETA, placed an explosive in the toilets of a hamburger restaurant, located a few meters from a tourist office, in the Alicante town of Torrevieja. No one died or was injured, although it caused serious material damage.

ETA claimed responsibility for the attack through a call to the Basque newspaper Gara, and the group also said it had placed a bomb on the beach in Santa Pola, which was found days later in palm trees.

== See also ==
- List of ETA attacks
