= Oyarzún =

Oyarzún or Oyarzun is a surname. Notable people with the surname include:

- Alain Oyarzun (born 1993), Spanish professional footballer
- Aureliano Oyarzún (1858–1947), Chilean physician and anthropologist
- Carlos Oyarzun (born 1981), Chilean professional road cyclist
- Diego Oyarzún (born 1993), Chilean professional footballer
- Elías Oyarzún (born 1988), Chilean handball player
- Enrique Oyarzún Mondaca (1860–1849), Chilean politician, lawyer, President of the Senate of Chile
- Juan Carlos Oyarzún (1951–2021), Argentine politician
- Leonor Oyarzún (1919–2022), Chilean family therapist, First Lady of Chile (1990–1994)
- Luis Oyarzún (footballer) (born 1982), Chilean former footballer
- Luis Oyarzún Peña, Chilean writer and aesthetician
- María Eugenia Oyarzún (born 1936), Chilean journalist, writer, and former diplomat
- María José Oyarzún (born 1980), Chilean teacher, member of the Chilean Constitutional Convention
- Mila Oyarzún (1912–1982), Chilean writer, poet and human rights activist
- Nelson Oyarzún (1943–1978), Chilean football manager
- Román Oyarzun Oyarzun (1882–1968), Spanish political activist, publisher, diplomat, entrepreneur, historian
- Víctor Oyarzún (born 1980), Chilean footballer

== See also ==
- Estadio Municipal Nelson Oyarzún Arenas, stadium located in Chillán, Chile
- Spanish name for Oiartzun, a town and municipality in the Basque Country
