= Ispaster =

- Municipality
- Ispáster
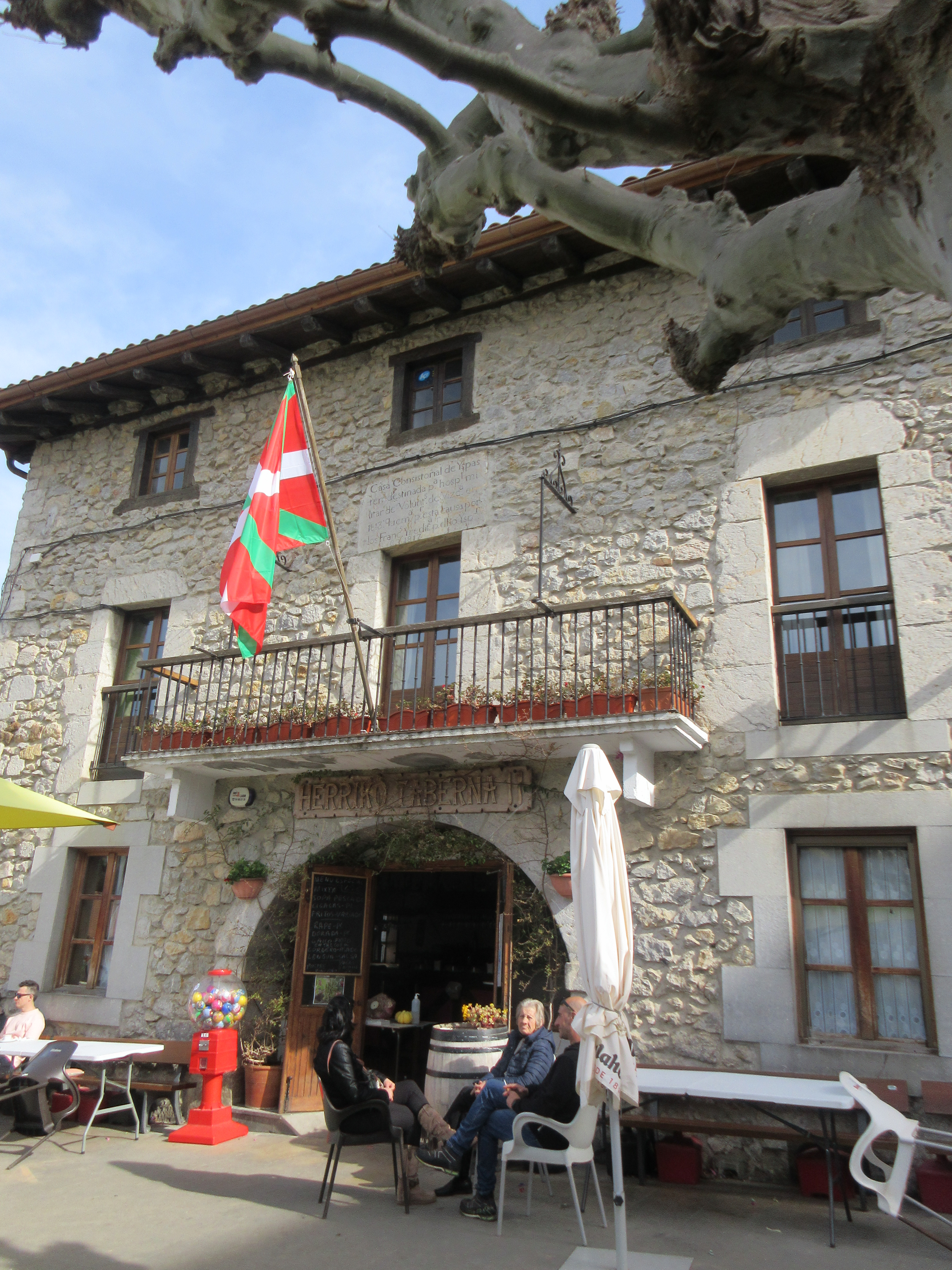
- Town hall

- Coat of arms

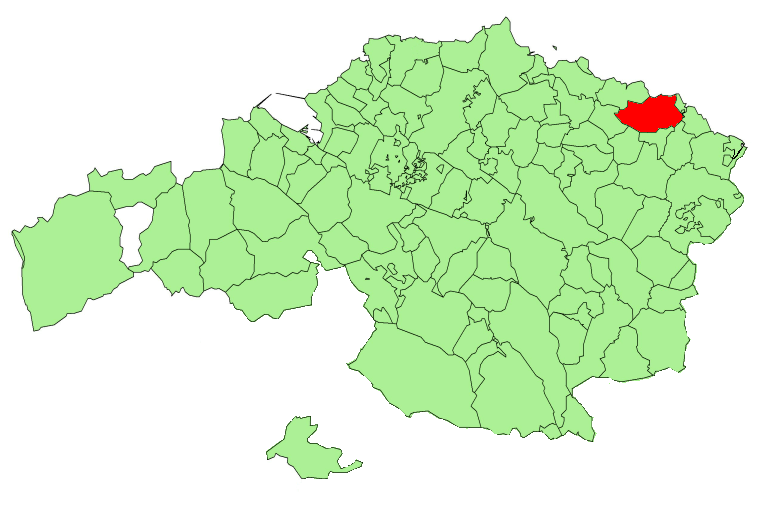
- Location of Ispaster in Biscay

- Location in Spain
- Coordinates: 43°21′46″N 2°32′35″W
- Country: Spain
- Autonomous community: País Vasco
- Province: Biscay
- Comarca: Lea-Artibai

Government
  - Mayor: Jesús María Lekerikabeaskoa Arrillaga (PNV)

Area
  - Total: 22.62 km^{2} (8.73 sq mi)
- Elevation: 110 m (360 ft)

Population (2025-01-01)
  - Total: 721
  - Density: 31.9/km^{2} (82.6/sq mi)
- Demonym: Ispastertarra
- Time zone: UTC+1 (CET)
  - Summer (DST): UTC+2 (CEST)
- Postal code: 48280
- Website: Official website

Ispaster is a town and municipality located in the province of Biscay, in the autonomous community of Basque Country, northern Spain. According to the 2019 census, it has 735 inhabitants.

== Prehistory ==
The first archaeological artifacts were found in the caves of Kobeaga II and Kobeaga I. The first, located a few kilometers away from the sea, a small group in Mesolithic dedicated to important activity settled as fishing. This settlement, formed by a population of men who fished Mollusca, was founded around 3500 BCE, according to the investigations made by Apellaniz in 1973. The second cave, Kobeaga I, located in the same area as the first, were used as a funeral enclosure during the Bronze Age. In this locality are in addition other deposits without excavating, such as Otoyo'ko Jentilkoba, Jentilkoba de Iparretxe and Urtiaga. The first documented mentions of the municipality of Ispaster date from year 1334, in an order of Alfonso XI.

== History ==
Ispaster is located in a coastal hill, alternating between low and sandy areas to cliffs. The first signs of human occupation are in diverse cavities where a small group lived on fishermen-recolectores during the Mesolithic. Others served like funeral enclosures from the Neolithic. At the beginning of the early modern period, a constructive explosion takes place that turns the municipality in Biscay's best equipped one in gothic-Renaissance popular architecture.

== Events ==
The Grand Prix Ayuntamiento de Ispaster is held in Ispaster.

== See also ==
- 1980 Ispaster attack
