= Esperanza y Cia =

Spanish weapons manufacturing company

Esperanza y Cia, SA (Ecia)
- Type: Joint stock company
- Industry: Defence
- Founded: 1925
- Founder: Juan Esperanza Salvador
- Defunct: 1994
- Headquarters: Markina-Xemein, Vizcaya, Basque Country, Spain
- Products: Explosives, Electro-optical devices
- Net income: 1,760 million peseta (1978)
- Number of employees: 223 (1991)

Esperanza y Cia, SA (Ecia) was a defense equipment manufacturer based in the city of Markina-Xemein in province of Vizcaya, Basque Country, Spain. From its origins, Ecia had focused primarily on the design and manufacture of mortars and their ammunition.

== History ==
The arms factory, Esperanza y Cia SA (Ecia) was founded in 1925 by prominent businessman Juan Esperanza Salvador (1860–1951). Esperanza-Salvador was one of the co-founders of Astra-Unceta y Cia SA. Ecia utilised the expertise which Esperanza-Salvador and Juan Pedro Unceta had previously accumulated in Eibar and Gernika, later known as Astra-Unceta, through the signature "Esperanza and Unceta".

Its first activity was the manufacture of guns, under patent from Alkartasuna Eibar, and then designed his own semi-automatic pistol (known as ECIA) and a light machine gun. The company moved to Marquina in 1933. During the Civil War, the company was controlled by the Basque Government, which moved the factory to Derio to move it away from the front and then to Bilbao. After the war the company returned to Marquina. In the 1940s production capabilities reached new levels with the development of lines of infantry mortars and their ammunition, the products that the company would prosper on. During the Second World War, Ecia would supply arms to Germany, though an attempt to supply arms to Egypt was rejected.

In 1978, the company was the largest arms exporter in Spain, ahead of another Basque firm, Explosivos Alaveses. At that time there were seven companies from Basque Country among the top ten Spanish weapons manufacturers.

In 1980, a convoy carrying military company material was attacked by a command of the separatist organization ETA, and the six civil guards who were escorting him were killed in the attack. In 1985 ETA also murdered José Martínez Parens, then the head of security for the company.

The arms industry entered a deep crisis in the 1980s, due to a decline in domestic and foreign demand. Under the new name, Esperanza y Cia Explosives, entered into partnership with Unión Explosivos Río Tinto, which grew up to 40% of the shares, and managed to survive through projects like the Euromortar.

In January 1986, it was alleged that the company had been provided military technology by Israeli companies, which Ecia denied. Ecia reputedly used loyalist prisoners of war from the Spanish Civil War as slave labour. Its reputation also suffered from the connection with the sale of arms to war-torn countries like Iraq or Iran, and even for the terrorist attacks suffered by their stocks and managers.

It did not help the situation of its main shareholder, ERT, which declared bankruptcy in 1992, as Esperanza Y Cia. closed its main plant in Markina in 1994. A small part of its research units were integrated into Alaveses Explosives-Expal, which would also cease to operate in 2004. Another 20 workers founded Ecia-Xemein in Markina in June 1995 to manufacture metal parts.

== Products ==
=== Firearms ===
In the late 1920s, Ecia manufactured prototypes of a double-action pistol and a machine-gun. An ECIA Model 1927 machine gun, with a rate of fire of 180 rounds per minute, was displayed at the Expedition of War Material taken from the Enemy in San Sebastián.

=== Mortars ===
Ecia manufactured mortars since the company's founding in 1925, though after the Civil War, it became the company's speciality. Customers using modern Ecia mortars include, among others, Guatemala and Chile. As well as manufacturing the weapons themselves, Ecia manufactured high explosive, smoke, and illumination rounds for its products, as well as training ammunition, anti-personal and anti-armour ammunition, and ammunition for 122 mm and 82 mm mortars.

==== Valero 60mm model 1926 ====
Entered into Spanish service by royal order on 4 May 1926.

- Caliber: 60 mm

==== Valero 50mm model 1932 ====
Entered into Spanish service by order on 6 September 1932.

- Caliber: 50 mm
- Ammunition weight: 780 g
- Range: from 50 to 1000 m
- Weight: 7 kg

==== Valero 81mm model 1933 ====
Entered into Spanish service by order on 24 May 1933, replacing the 1926 60mm modelas battalion weapon.

- Caliber: 81 mm
- Ammunition weight: 4 kg
- Maximum range: 3250 m
- Weight: 63 kg
- Tube length: 1.2m

==== 120mm "Franco" ====
Began manufacture in 1942.

- Caliber: 120mm
- Weight: 85 kg
- Maximum range: 6400 m
- Firing Rate: 3 shots / minute

==== Valero-Ecia 1942 models ====
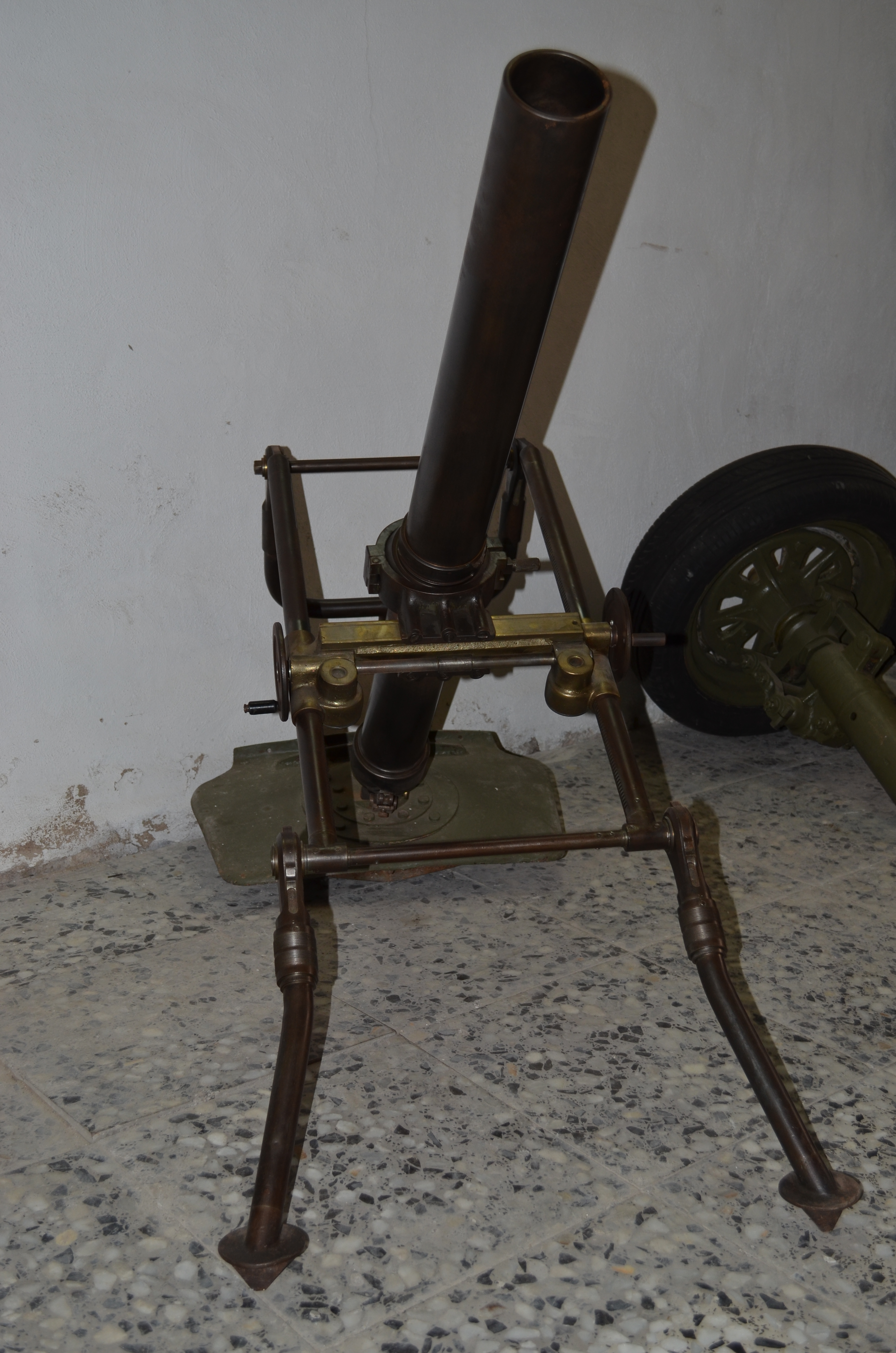
Valero-Ecia 81mm mortar 1942 model.

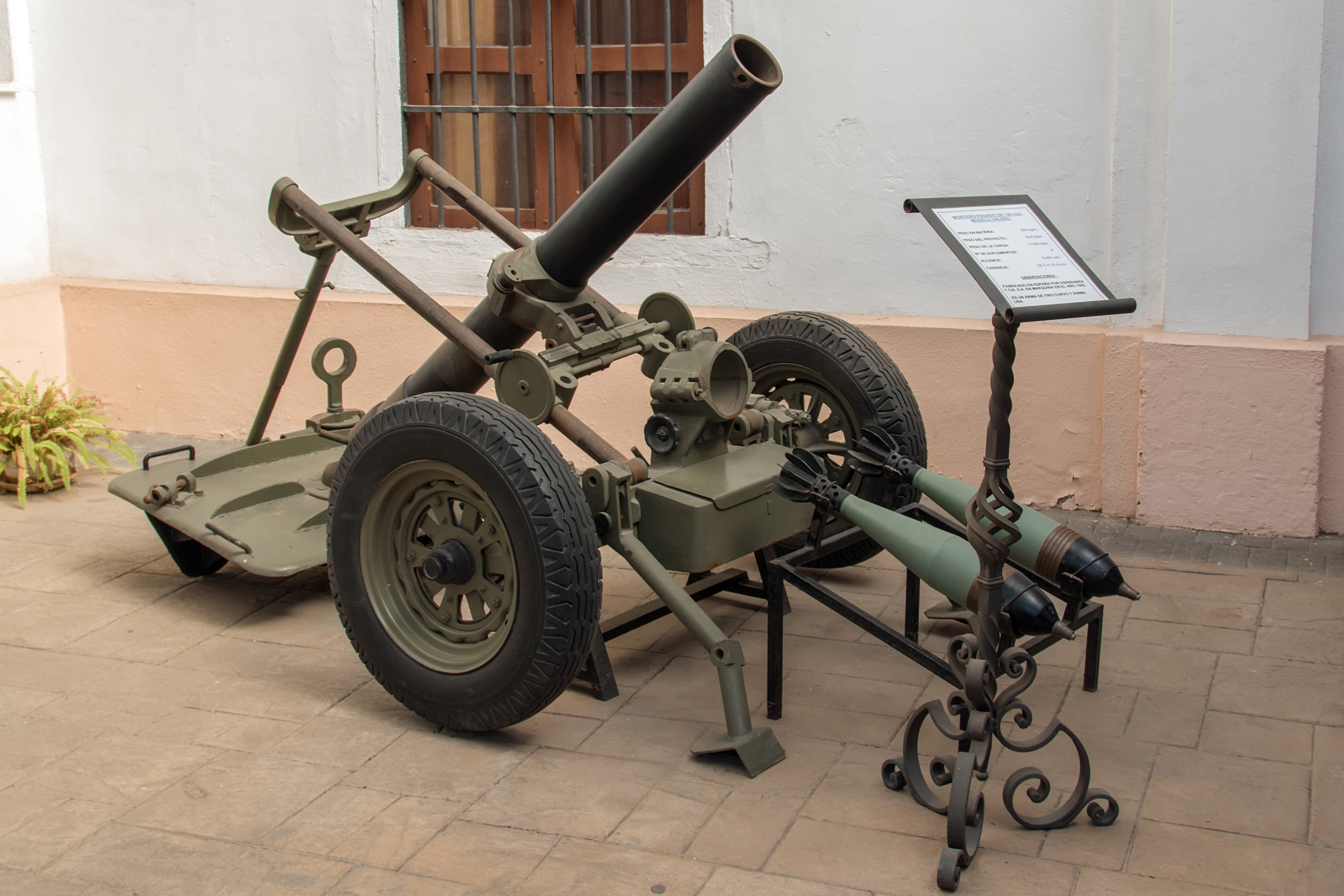
Valero-Ecia 120mm mortar 1942 model.

An 81mm caliber and a 120mm caliber model was produced from 1942.

==== Ecia models 1951 ====
Three types of Ecia models replaced the Valeros previously in service, improving on weight. 60mm, 81mm and 120mm variants were produced.

===== Ecia model 1951 81mm =====
Transported by four individuals or a mule, or used on vehicles.

- Caliber: 81 mm
- Ammunition weight: 3,935 kg (breaker) 4,154 kg (smoke)
- Range: from 200 to 3145m
- Fire Rate: 10 to 30 shots / minute
- Elevation: 49.5° to 89.5°
- Position weight: 66.37 kg

===== Ecia model 1951 120mm =====
Transported by being towed.

- Caliber: 120mm
- Ammunition weight: 16.55 kg (breaker) 17.7 kg (smoke)
- Range: 600 to 6400m
- Fire Rate: 5 to 10 shots / minute
- Elevation: 49.5 ° to 89.5 °
- Position weight: 321.62 kg
- Tube length: 1m

==== Ecia Models C, C-2 and L 60mm ====
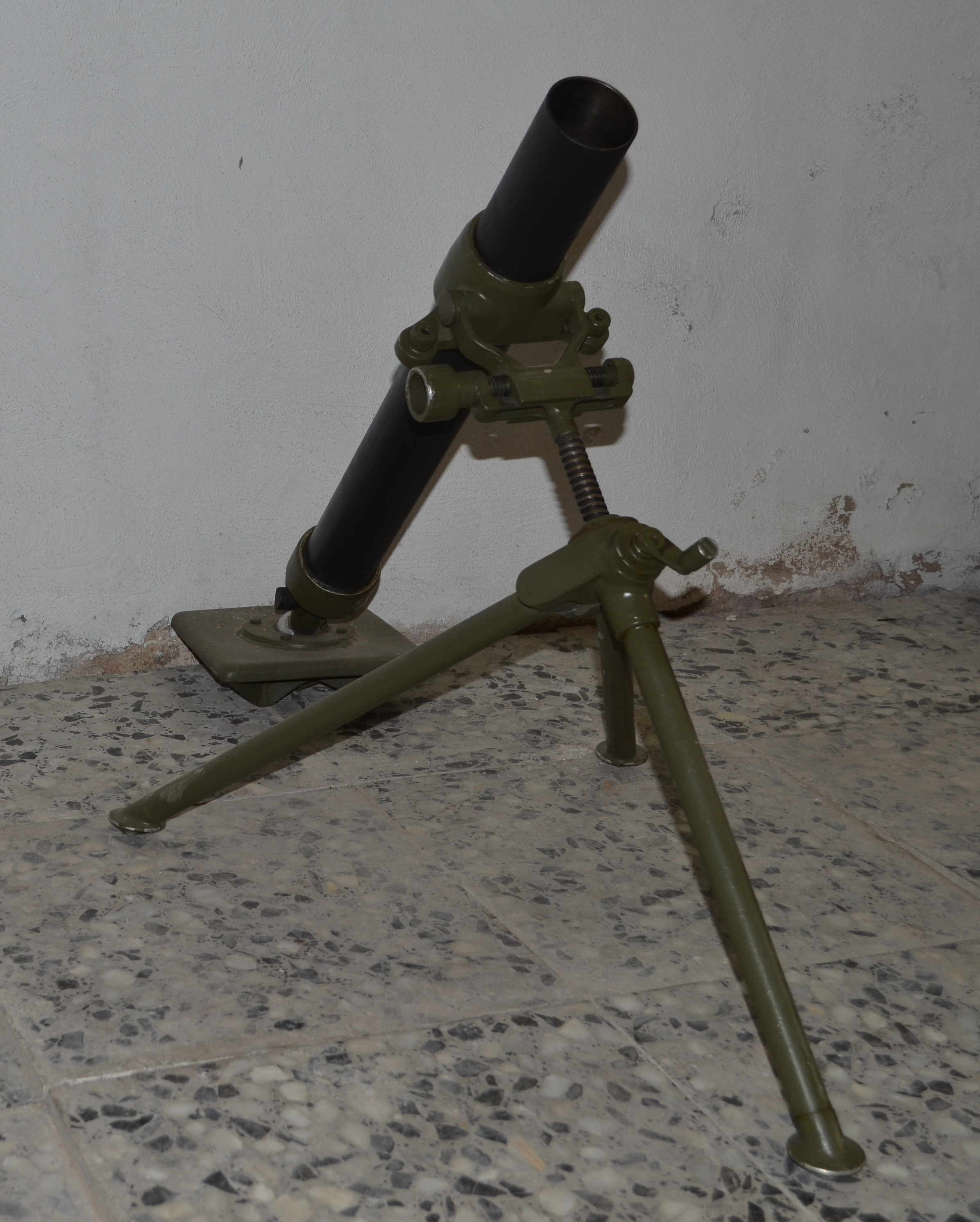
Ecia 60mm model L.

Also called the "Commando", the C model was designed for special operations units. The C-2 variant was used on vehicles, whilst the L had a bipod to increase its range to 2000m. Their low weight allowed them to be utilised by a single individual.

- Caliber: 60mm
- Ammunition weight: 1,428 kg (explosive, smoke) 1,966 kg (illuminant)
- Maximum range: 1060 m (C, C-2) 2100 m (L)
- Firing rate: 30 shots / minute
- Elevation: 49.5 ° to 89.5 °
- Weight in position: 5 kg (C) 10 kg (L)
- Tube length: 650mm

==== ECIA Models L and L1 81mm ====
These mortars were equipped with a tripod instead of the usual bipod. They could be transported, dismounted, by a team of three.

- Caliber: 81.35 mm
- Ammunition weight: 4.13 kg (N) 3.2 kg (NA)
- Maximum range: 4100 m (L) 4500 m (L)
- Firing Rate: 15 shots / minute
- Weight in position: 43 kg (L) 45 kg (L1)
- Tube length: 1.15m (L) 1.45m (L1)

==== ECIA Model L 105mm ====
Larger mortar with a circular base, designed to be transported which mounted on a two-wheeled trailer.

- Caliber: 105mm
- Ammunition weight: 9.2 kg (HE)
- Maximum range: 7050 m
- Firing Rate: 12 shots / minute
- Position weight: 105 kg
- Shipping weight: 239 kg
- Tube length: 1.5m

==== ECIA Model SL and L 120mm ====
Transported in a two-wheeled trailer.

- Caliber: 120mm
- Ammunition weight: 16,745 kg (N-HE) 13,195 kg (L-HE)
- Maximum range: 5000m (L / N-HE) 5940m (L / L-HE) 5700m (SL / N-HE) 6660m (SL / L-HE)
- Firing Rate: 12 shots / minute
- Position weight: 123 kg (SL) 213 kg (L)
- Shipping weight: 257 kg (SL) 316 kg (L)
- Tube length: 1.6m

==== ECIA L65/120 ====
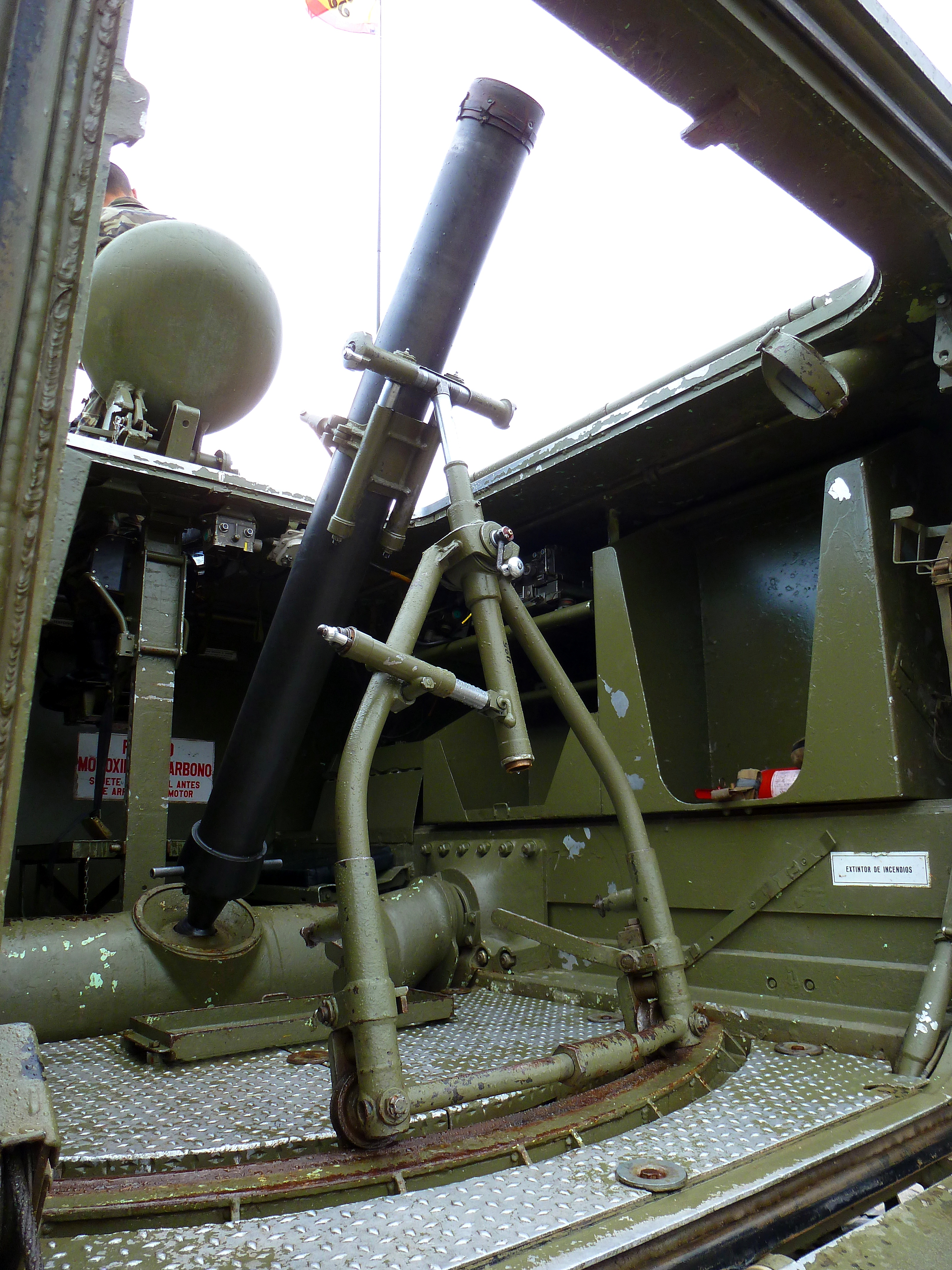
ECIA L-65/120 mortar of the Spanish Army on a M-113.

== See also ==
- Astra-Unceta y Cia SA - another company founded by Juan Esperanza Salvador.

== Bibliography ==
1. ↑ Historicó de Biskaia
2. ↑ El Mundo 12 de febrero de 1999 Expal fabrica bombas de aviación para Turquía
