= Orio, Spain =

Orio
- Municipality
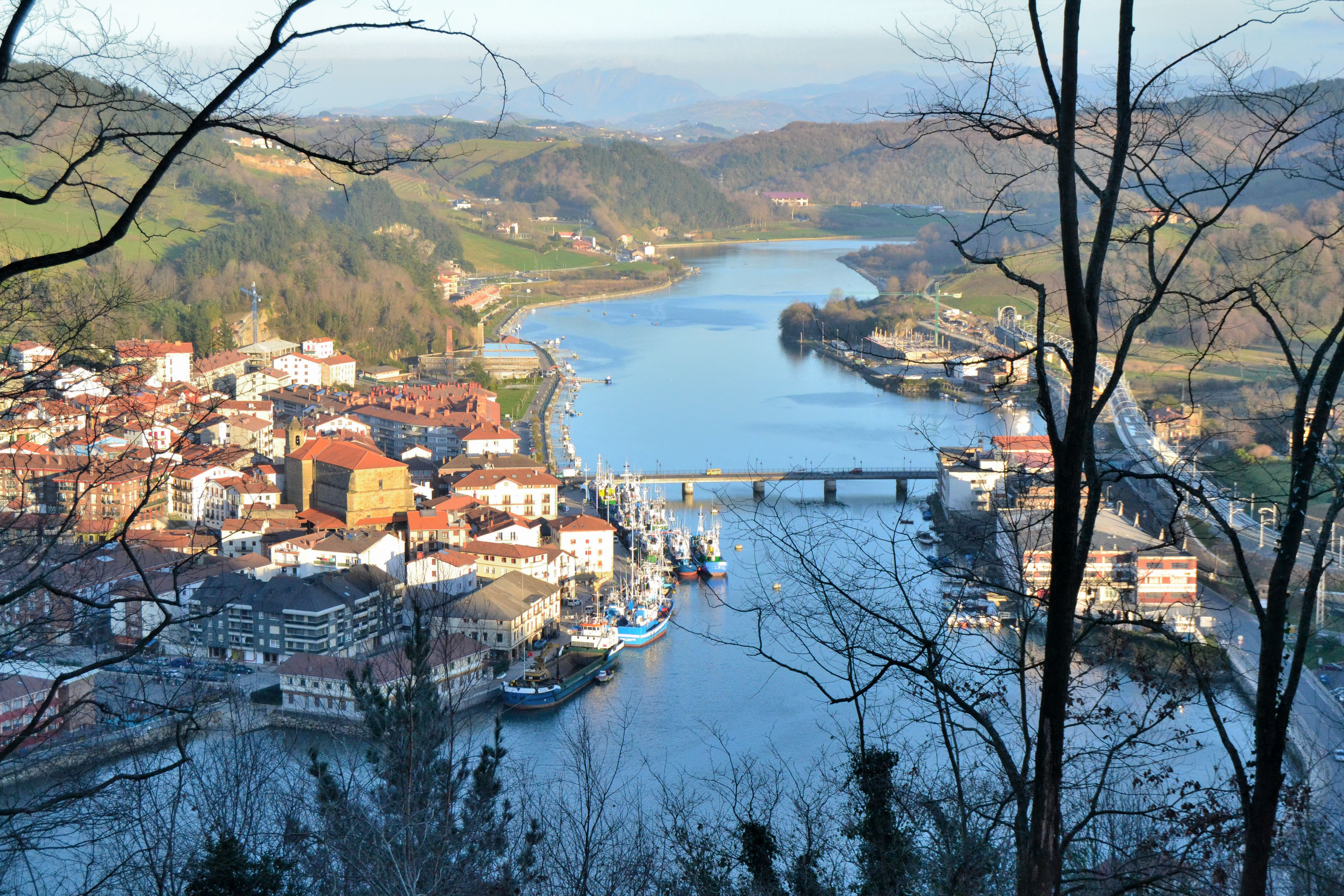
- View of Orio

- Coat of arms

- Location of Orio within the Basque Country Location of Orio within Spain
- Coordinates: 43.278°N 2.126°W
- Country: Spain
- Autonomous community: Basque Country
- Province: Gipuzkoa
- Comarca: Urola Kosta

Government
  - Mayor: Anuska Esnal Oliden

Area
  - Total: 9.81 km^{2} (3.79 sq mi)
- Elevation: 1 m (3.3 ft)

Population (2025-01-01)
  - Total: 6,184
  - Density: 630/km^{2} (1,630/sq mi)
- Time zone: UTC+1 (CET)
  - Summer (DST): UTC+2 (CEST)
- Postal code: 20810
- Website: www.orio.eus/

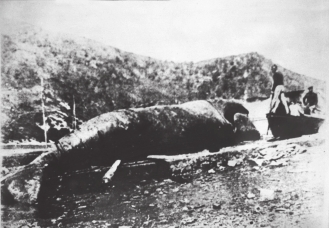
The Orio whale

Orio is a fishing town located in the province of Gipuzkoa in the Basque Autonomous Community, northern Spain, with the town nucleus lying on the river Oria, roughly one mile away from its mouth by the Bay of Biscay. Orio had a population of 5,901 inhabitants as of 2016.

Traditionally a town attached to the sea and the fishing industry, this sector is losing ground to the more profitable and less demanding tourism, rapidly developing after marshes between the town and the beach were drained with a view to building up new tourist oriented housing. The most widely known and conspicuous sport activity in Orio is the rowing regatta typical of the Basque and Cantabric coastal area, featuring a team represented by the yellow colour.

The town is served by Euskotren Trena's coastal line, the N-634 road and the A-8 motorway (since 2010).

A festival representing the last catch of North Atlantic right whales within Basque whaling in 1901, have been held on every 5 years. This catch also reflected in a folk poem popularized by singer-songwriter Benito Lertxundi.

== Geography ==
Orio is located on the coast of Gipuzkoa, in the Beterri region. The town is located next to the last meadow of the river Oria, before its mouth (river mouth), in the Bay of Biscay.

The territory of the municipality of Orio is 9.81 km². The river Oria sets the southern and western boundaries between Orio and Aia, on the right bank of Orio and Aia, on the left. It is curious that both sides of the Oria River are under the jurisdiction of Oriente, although the river is bounded by two municipalities, traditionally because Orio has controlled the river.

From the North, the Cantabrian Sea borders the border, with the majority of the coastline of Orio formed by cliffs. Specifically, the only humble coastline of the area is located on the right bank of the river on the Antilla beach. The northeastern part of the municipality forms the Talaimendi mountain, with a peak of Kukuarri (362m).

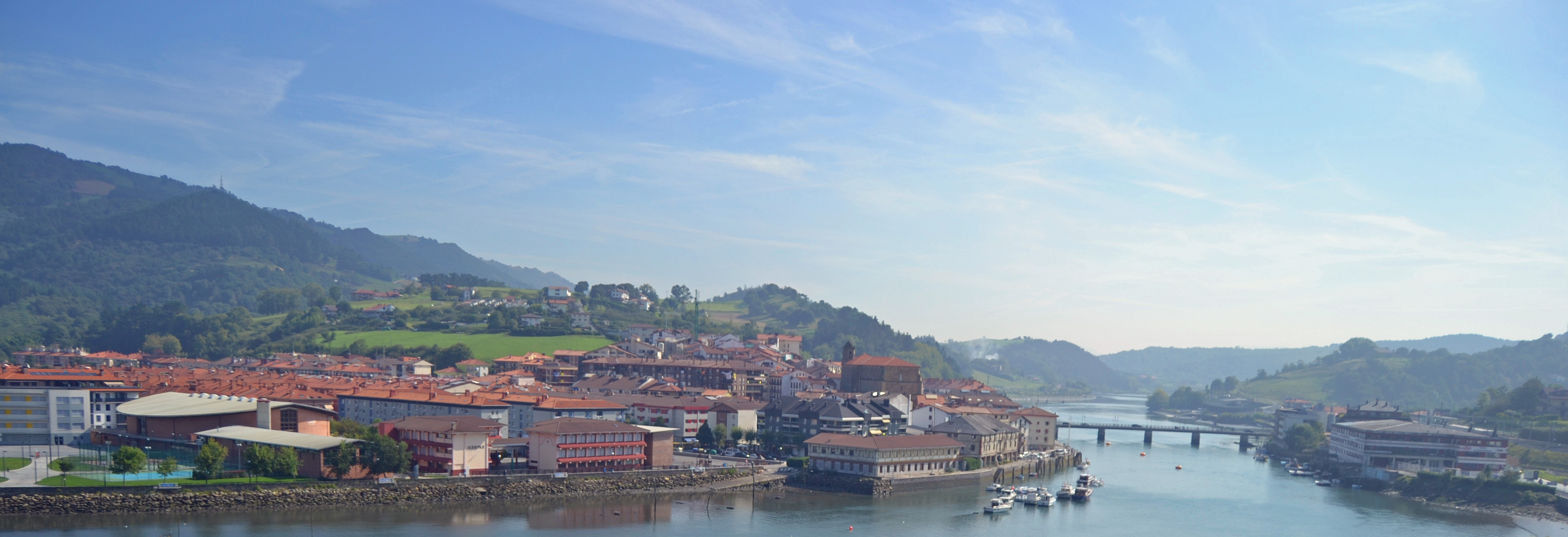
Panoramic view of Orio, the Orio estuary and the Orio bridge

== See also ==
- 1980 Orio ambush
