= 1980 Orio ambush =

Terrorist incident in Spain

- Part of the Basque conflict
Date	13 July 1980
Location	Orio, Spain
Result	Inconclusive

Belligerents
(Basque Country (autonomous community)) ETA	Spain: Civil Guard

Strength
5–8	8+

Casualties and losses
2 killed	2 killed

The 1980 Orio ambush was a gun and grenade attack by the Basque separatist organisation ETA which occurred on 13 July 1980 near the Basque town of Orio. The targets were a convoy of civil guards who had just finished their shift guarding the nearby munitions factory. Two civil guards were killed and three injured, while two ETA members were killed after the civil guards starting the new shift came to the assistance of their colleagues.

== The attack ==
On the day of the attack, ETA hijacked a car in Lasarte, threatening the owner, Claudio Rivera, with death if he informed the police before 16:00.

The attack occurred at 14:05 on a Sunday afternoon. ETA had carried out a similar attack earlier in the year, killing six civil guards in an ambush at Ispaster. The civil guards, having just finished their shift at the munitions factory, were driving to their barracks in three official vehicles. The ETA unit, waiting near the bridge at the main road, launched grenades at the vehicles and subjected them to crossfire, killing two of the guards and wounding three. Another group of civil guards, who had arrived at the munitions factory to begin their shift, heard the shooting and rushed to assist their colleagues. Opening fire on the ETA unit, with the terrain advantage caused by the elevation of the factory, they managed to kill two ETA members after an exchange of gunfire. The remaining ETA members fled down the mountain.

== Aftermath ==
ETA military claimed responsibility for the attack. The vehicle which they had used was later found abandoned in San Sebastián. The vehicle's owner, Claudio Rivera, was subsequently detained by police for refusing to cooperate. Police searching the scene found shell casings which corresponded to those used in CETME and Remington guns. They also found three grenades which had failed to explode and a fourth which had not been used, as well as false identity documents.

Local festivals taking place in Barakaldo were suspended in tribute to the ETA members killed, while councillors of ETA's political wing, Herri Batasuna, organised localised strikes.
