= 1980 Ispaster attack =

Terrorist incident in Spain

1980 Ispaster ambush
- Part of the Basque conflict
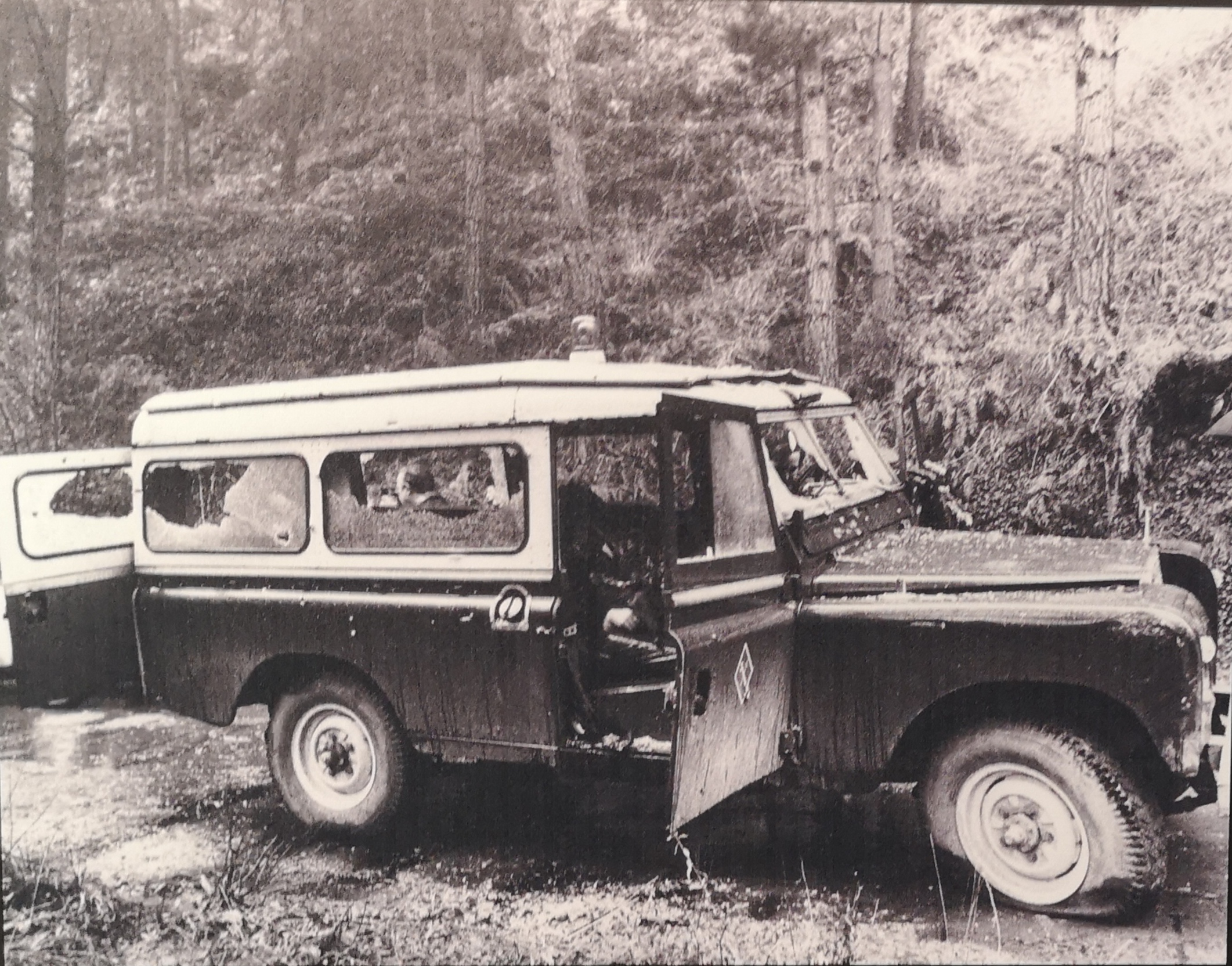
- Land Rover destroyed in the attack
Date	1 February 1980
Location	Ispaster, Spain
Result	ETA victory

Belligerents
(Basque Country (autonomous community)) ETA	Spain: Civil Guard

Strength
8–11	6

Casualties and losses
2 killed	6 killed

The 1980 Ispaster attack was a gun and grenade attack by the Basque separatist organisation ETA which occurred on 1 February 1980 near the Basque town of Ispaster. The targets were a convoy of civil guards who were escorting workers and weapons from the nearby Esperanza y Cia Arms factory to Bilbao. A total of six civil guards were killed, while two ETA members were killed by hand grenades that they had thrown. The attack was the deadliest of 1980, the year when ETA killed more people than any other.

== The attack ==
The attack occurred on a Friday morning. ETA had observed similar convoys from the factory and planned their ambush based on information that they had gathered. The convoy consisted of four vehicles, the first carrying technicians, the third mortar devices produced by the factory and the second and fourth vehicles carrying three civil guards each. The vehicle left the factory at 7:30 am and at approximately 8:15 am, had to slow down at a part of the road which consisted of numerous bends. The ETA members had chosen a spot near a small hill, where they were hidden from view by dense vegetation. After allowing the vehicle carrying the factory workers to pass, ETA launched a grenade at the second vehicle, causing it to be stuck in a layby and then attacked the civil guard's vehicles with assault rifles, machine guns and grenades, firing over 100 shots. In order to ensure that no civil guards survived, the ETA members approached the vehicles and threw a hand grenade into the first civil guard's vehicle. When they repeated this with the second vehicle, two ETA members, Gregorio Olabarría Gorrotxategui Bengoa and Javier Argote, were killed as a result of injuries suffered when they failed to escape in time before the grenades exploded. One of these was subsequently found 6 kilometres away from the attack, having apparently been moved there by his comrades. At 8:45 am, a man had approached a bar near the scene and had asked in Basque for medical assistance.

The drivers of the third vehicle, which had been trapped between the civil guard's vehicles, were allowed to go free and ordered to go down the hill by the ETA members, where they eventually reached a main road. The weapons in the third vehicle were seized by the ETA team.

Having been alerted by a local resident who had heard the gunfire and explosions, the police arrived on the scene at 9:00 am and found a large quantity of grenades, 9 millimetre ammunition and guns of Belgian origin.

== Reactions ==
The attack took place at a time when devolution of power to the Basque autonomous region was imminent, with the first elections taking place one month later. The attack was condemned by the Basque General Council, the forerunner of the modern Basque government, and most of the region's main parties like the Basque Nationalist Party, Spanish Socialist Workers' Party (PSOE), Euskadiko Ezkerra and the Union of the Democratic Centre (UCD).

During the funeral of one of the ETA members killed in the attack, Gregorio Olabarría, the priest gave a homily attacking ETA violence. For this he was heckled by some of those attending the funeral who shouted slogans in support of the group such as "Gora ETA!"

There were also disturbances at the funeral of the six civil guards. Protestors shouted insults at Government ministers, who had to be protected by a police cordon. Members of the press and the PSOE were not allowed to attend the funerals, though members of the UCD and Popular Alliance were in attendance.

== Arrests and judicial processes ==
On 25 June 1982, five people, Francisco Esquisavel, Angel Recalde, Jesús Trocaola, Juan Ramón Ibarlueca, Ana Guerenabarrena and María Isabel Mendiola appeared in court accused of having participated or cooperated in the attack. Esquisavel and Recalde were accused of direct participation while Trocaola was accused of having sheltered ETA fugitives who had taken part. Mendiola was accused of having driven a get away car for one of those involved in the attack while Ibarlueca and Guerenabarrena were accused of having cleaned away blood stains from a car used.

In 1984, Jaime Rementería Beotegui was found guilty of participation in the attack, fined 60 million pesetas, and sentenced to prison. Having been in prison since August 1983, he was released in January 2004. Francisco Esquisavel was also found guilty of participation and was released from prison in 2002 after 22 years incarceration.

In 1999, the only outstanding case was settled. Jose Luis Ansola Larranaga ("Peio the Elder") was acquitted of involvement in the attack on the basis of lack of evidence. The Chief Prosecutor, Eduardo Fungairiño, and the Association of Victims of Terrorism had alleged that Ansola had been the author of the operation and had requested 174 years in prison for him.

== Subsequent attacks ==
On 13 July 1980, ETA attempted to repeat the tactics of the Ispaster attack with an ambush at Orio. However, after killing 2 civil guards, the ETA unit was counter-attacked by civil guards, resulting in the deaths of two ETA members.
