= Aditi Roy =

Indian filmmaker and screenwriter

- Education: Jadavpur University
- Occupations: Film director; Screenwriter
- Years active: 2011–present

Aditi Roy (pronounced [ɔditi rae̯]) is an Indian director and screenwriter who primarily works in the Bengali film, television and OTT industries. She is known for directing socially themed dramas, including the web series Bodhon, Noshtoneer, Lojja and the romantic drama series Parineeta, all of which were streamed on Hoichoi.

== Early life and education ==
Roy developed an interest in journalism and filmmaking at an early age. Her father was a photojournalist, and she began handling cameras while she was young. She graduated with a BSc in Political Science from the Jadavpur University. For her MSc, she got enrolled in International Relations at the university but left the course midway to pursue a career in cinema.

Roy subsequently completed her master's degree in Film Studies from Jadavpur University in 2002. In the same year, she also completed a diploma in Mass Communication from the university. She later studied film direction at Roopkala Kendro in Kolkata. Her diploma film was screened at the Kolkata Film Festival in 2007.

== Career ==
=== 2010—2021: Film debut and early career ===
Roy began her professional career by making short films, small documentaries, fund-raising films for various non-governmental organisations and some corporate films. She also served as the creative head in few daily television soap operas. She later moved to feature films and streaming productions.

Roy made her feature-film directorial debut with Abosheshey (2011). She developed the film together with writer Neel B. Mitra, with whom she had previously worked in various short films and corporate films. It stars Roopa Ganguly, Raima Sen and Ankur Khanna in the lead roles. The film passed through multiple drafts from 2008 before it began production in 2010. It was screened at the 16th International Film Festival of Kerala and the 2012 New York Indian Film Festival. The film also received the Network for the Promotion of Asian Cinema Award for Best Asian Film at the 16th IFFK in 2011.

In 2015, she directed the television film Onnyo Basanto. It was released on Zee Bangla Cinema as a Zee Originals film. In 2019, she directed the short film Bhalobashar Shohor – Saayori. In 2019, Roy directed the Bengali film Daawat-e-Biryani starring Sauraseni Maitra, Jayant Kripalani and Suhasini Mulay.

=== 2022-present: Web series and commercial success ===
In 2022, Roy made her streaming productions directorial debut with the Bengali web series Bodhon, streamed on Hoichoi. Its second season, Bodhon 2, was released in 2023. It explored issues such as witch-hunting, women trafficking, caste discrimination and honour killing. Later that year, she directed the series Noshtoneer, which was streamed on Hoichoi. The series follows a woman whose family life is disrupted after an unexpected incident involving a MeToo allegation.

In 2024, she directed Parineeta, a Bengali web series based on Sarat Chandra Chattopadhyay's novel of the same name. The series starred Gaurav Chakrabarty and Debchandrima Singha Roy in the lead roles. Unlike the original novel, the adaptation was set against the backdrop of the Partition of Bengal. She also directed Lojja, which was released on Hoichoi later that year. Starring Priyanka Sarkar, the series deals with verbal abuse within a marriage and its impact on the victim.

In 2025, she directed Lojja 2, the second season of Lojja. In the same year, she directed the crime thriller Anusandhan, starring Subhashree Ganguly. It is about an journalist who faces life risk while investigating a crime syndicate. In 2026, she directed the mystery thriller Kuheli, which centres on a police investigation into the death of a senior police officer.

== Filmography ==
Year	Film	Director	Screenwriter	Language	Notes	Ref.
2011	Abosheshey	Yes	No	Bengali	Marked her directorial feature film debut	
2015	Onnyo Basanto	Yes	No	Bengali	Zee Originals film released directly on Zee Bangla Cinema	
2019	Daawat-e-Biryani	Yes	No	Bengali		

== Web series ==
Year	Web series	Director	Screenwriter	Platform	Language	Notes	Ref.
2022	Bodhon	Yes	No	Hoichoi	Bengali	Directorial debut in web series	
2023	Noshtoneer	Yes	No	Hoichoi	Bengali		
2023	Bodhon 2	Yes	No	Hoichoi	Bengali		
2024	Parineeta	Yes	No	Hoichoi	Bengali	Based on the eponymous novel by Sarat Chandra Chattopadhyay	
2024	Noshtoneer 2	Yes	No	Hoichoi	Bengali		
2024	Lojja	Yes	No	Hoichoi	Bengali		
2025	Anusandhan	Yes	No	Hoichoi	Bengali		
2025	Lojja 2	Yes	No	Hoichoi	Bengali		
2026	Kuheli	Yes	No	Hoichoi	Bengali		
