= Noshtoneer (TV series) =

Indian Bengali web series

- Release poster
- Based on: MeToo movement
- Written by: Samragnee Bandyopadhyay
- Dialogues by: Samragnee Bandyopadhyay
- Screenplay by: Samragnee Bandyopadhyay
- Directed by: Aditi Roy
- Starring: Sandipta Sen; Shoumo Banerjee
- Theme music composer: Subhadeep Guha
- Composer: Subhadeep Guha
- Country of origin: India
- Original language: Bengali
- No. of seasons: 2
- No. of episodes: 12

Production
- Cinematography: Aalok Maiti
- Editor: Subhajit Singha
- Camera setup: Single-camera
- Running time: 19-32 minutes
- Production company: Shree Venkatesh Films

Original release
- Release: 2023 – present

Noshtoneer (transl. Broken Nest) is an Indian Bengali social drama web series directed by Aditi Roy. Written by Samragnee Bandyopadhyay, the series has been produced under the banner of Shree Venkatesh Films. The series stars Sandipta Sen and Shoumo Banerjee in the lead roles while Angana Roy, Rooqma Ray, Anindya Chatterjee and Ushasi Ray play other pivotal roles.

The series is inspired from the MeToo movement. Subhadeep Guha has composed the music as well as the background score of the series. Subhajit Singha has done the cinematography while Aalok Maiti has handled the editing. Two season of the series are streaming on the Bengali OTT platform Hoichoi.

== Overview ==
Rishabh Gangopadhyay is a college professor. One day, Godhuli Basak, his former student, accuses him of sexual harassment and exploitation. Godhuli says that she and Rishabh had been in a consensual relationship, but he suddenly stopped keeping contact with her when she became pregnant. She also claims that she is pregnant with his child and seeks his support.

Everyone gets to know about this incident. This causes Rishabh's reputation, career and marriage to come under pressure. His wife Aparna initially stands beside him, believing that he is innocent. But as more details about the affair are exposed, Aparna begins to lose her faith in their marriage.

Godhuli struggles without the support she had expected from Rishabh. Her condition later deteriorates and she dies in hospital. Rishabh gets bail but by his relationship with Aparna has deteriorated. Aparna decides to end their marriage.

== Cast ==
- Sandipta Sen as Aparna Gangopadhyay
- Shoumo Banerjee as Prof. Risabh Gangopadhyay, Aparna's husband
- Angana Roy as Godhuli Basak, Risabh's former student
- Rooqma Ray as Namrata, Aparna's friend
- Anindya Chatterjee as Soumyo, Namrata's partner
- Rahul Dev Bose as Ritam, Soumyo's brother
- Lokenath Dey as Lawyer Akhilesh Pradhan
- Nabonita Malakar as Ritam's wife
- Ushasi Ray as Surma, a neighbour

== Episodes ==
Series	Episodes	Originally released
1	6	9 June 2023
2	6	26 July 2024

=== Season 1 (2023) ===
No.	Title	Directed by	Written by	Original release date
1	"Roopkatha Noy"	Aditi Roy	Samragnee Bandyopadhyay	9 June 2023
2	"Suyorani Duyorani"	Aditi Roy	Samragnee Bandyopadhyay	9 June 2023
3	"Tanaporen"	Aditi Roy	Samragnee Bandyopadhyay	9 June 2023
4	"Rajar Asukh"	Aditi Roy	Samragnee Bandyopadhyay	9 June 2023
5	"Jogajog"	Aditi Roy	Samragnee Bandyopadhyay	9 June 2023
6	"Rani Kahini"	Aditi Roy	Samragnee Bandyopadhyay	9 June 2023

=== Season 2 (2024) ===
No.	Title	Directed by	Written by	Original release date
1	"Bhalobashar Mrittyu"	Aditi Roy	Samragnee Bandyopadhyay	26 July 2024
2	"Bishphool"	Aditi Roy	Samragnee Bandyopadhyay	26 July 2024
3	"Shotyi Kichu Nei"	Aditi Roy	Samragnee Bandyopadhyay	26 July 2024
4	"Shesh Upohaar"	Aditi Roy	Samragnee Bandyopadhyay	26 July 2024
5	"Khunje Phiri Takey"	Aditi Roy	Samragnee Bandyopadhyay	26 July 2024
6	"Khela Bhangar Khela"	Aditi Roy	Samragnee Bandyopadhyay	26 July 2024

== Marketing ==
An announcement teaser was revealed on 21 June 2023. The trailer of the first season of Noshtoneer was released on 23 May 2023. The trailer of second season, Noshtoneer 2, was released on 16 July 2024.

== Reception ==
=== Critical reception ===
==== Season 1 ====
Priyam Marik of The Telegraph reviewed the series and opined "Noshtoneer deserves a watch. Director Aditi Roy knows that the show’s purpose is to generate a debate, not to decide it; to represent a movement, not to reduce it to moments that trade understanding for attention." She appreciated the character development of the lead actors, Sandipta's seasoned performance, the topic chosen by the director, the attempt to focus on a broader perspective and its storyline which focuses neither on the accused nor on the victim. But she bemoaned the presence of multiple loopholes in the last episode, below average cinematography, dated background score, not-so-fitting dialogues, lack of sufficient dramatic tension and the easy solutions to the crises.

Sandipta Bhanja of Sangbad Pratidin reviewed the series and wrote "Director Aditi Roy and story writer Samragnee Bandyopadhyay have wrapped up Noshtoneer while keeping that question alive. The series knocks on the door of society to challenge outdated, trashy notions like "a household is happy due to the virtues of a woman" and "women are women's worst enemies." She praised the performance of the lead cast as well as the supporting actors but bemoaned the slow pace in the first three episodes.

Shamayita Chakraborty of OTTplay rated the series 3/5 stars and noted "Noshtoneer is a one-time watch. Do not watch it for any social messages. But watch it to see the resilience of women when they are wronged – both when they win and when they lose." She applauded the well written characters, the performance of all the actors, the usage of Rabindra Sangeet as a background element for conveying unspoken emotions, and the display of the conflict in a women's emotions. But she criticized the lack of sharp dialogues, the lack of eye-catching moments, serial-fication of the storytelling, the unnecessary slow motion shots of Sandipta's character and the melodramatic touch in her acting.

Souvik Saha of Cine Kolkata rated the series 2/5 stars and wrote "Noshtoneer benefits from Sandipta Sen’s star performance and effectively addresses the #MeToo theme. The direction captures the struggles faced by individuals and families, although some scenes lack subtlety and realism." He praised Sandipta's performance, the direction, the display of #MeToo theme, well written characters, the portrayal of the struggles faced by affected families, the usage of Rabindra Sangeet to convey emotions and the performance of the supporting actors but criticized the performances of Shoumo and Angana, unnecessary slow motion shots, exaggerated household chores and the lack of finesse on some scenes.

==== Season 2 ====
Sandipta Bhanja of Sangbad Pratidin reviewed the series and wrote "Noshtoneer 2 has once again knocked on our doors to challenge outdated societal stereotypes like "a home is happy only by the virtues of a woman..." or "women are women's worst enemies"." She appreciated the pace throughout the six episodes, Sandipta's layered performance, the message delivered on women independence and dignity, the writing, the direction and the suspense maintained throughout the last few episodes.

=== Audience reception ===
Noshtoneer received significant viewership on Hoichoi. According to reports, the series became one of the most-viewed original series on the platform. Hoichoi stated that the series' performance also caused a major growth in their number of subscribers.
