= Paap (TV series) =

Indian Bengali web series

- Release poster
- Genre: Drama, Thriller
- Directed by: Anupam Hari, Joydeep Mukherjee
- Country of origin: India
- Original languages: Bengali; Hindi
- No. of seasons: 2
- No. of episodes: 10

Production
- Production company: SVF

Original release
- Release: 2 October 2019 – 4 June 2021

Paap (English: Sin) is an Indian Bengali-language family drama-murder mystery directed by Anupam Hari which started streaming on popular Bengali OTT platform hoichoi from 2 October 2019. The series stars Puja Banerjee who made her debut in Bengali web series through this web series. The series also features Saheb Bhattacharya, Solanki Roy, Rahul Banerjee, Ishani Das, Rajat Ganguly, Bhaswar Chattopadhyay, Rupsa Dasgupta, Priyanka Mondal, Indrajit Chakraborty in the key roles.

Durga Puja is the most important festival for Bengalis, where all the family members meet and enjoy this precious festival together. The actual meaning of the Bengali word ‘Paap’ is ‘Sin’. The series is based on an ancient Durga Puja celebration of a family, where all members and relatives of the family have come to become a part of the celebration. Meanwhile, an unwanted guest comes who had a mysterious past life and have some long-kept secrets about the family. At the same time, two dead bodies are discovered in the house and the puja house becomes a crime scene and there are many mysteries to unveil.

== Cast ==
- Puja Banerjee as Parboni 'Paru'/ Rubina
- Saheb Bhattacharya as Chhoton Chowdhury
- Rahul Banerjee as Inspector Monojit Halder/Nabin Chandra Das
- Ishani Das as young Paru
- Bhaswar Chattopadhyay as Srimonto Chowdhury 'Tublu' a.k.a. Mejda
- Solanki Roy / Mishmee Das as Tiya Chowdhury
- Roopsha Dasgupta as Bidisha Chowdhury
- Priyanka Mondal as Sneha
- Angana Roy
- Indrajit Chakraborty as Dhiman Chowdhury'Bablu' a.k.a. Borda
- Rajat Ganguly as Baikunto Chowdhury a.k.a. Natun Mesho

== Episodes ==
Season	Episodes	Originally released
1	5	October 2, 2019
2	5	June 4, 2021

== Season 1 (2019) ==
On 28 September 2019 on the day of Mahalaya, hoichoi released the trailer of the series.Paap was released on 2 October 2019 with five episodes.

=== Season 1 Episodes ===
No.	Title	Directed by	Original release date
1	"Suchipatra"	Anupam Hari	2 October 2019
2	"Agontuk"	Anupam Hari	2 October 2019
3	"Aro Aghat"	Anupam Hari	2 October 2019
4	"Mukhobondho"	Anupam Hari	2 October 2019
5	"Porbo Ek"	Anupam Hari	2 October 2019

== Season 2 (2021) ==
On 4 June 2021 hoichoi released the second season of the original web series. The second season has been called as the "Antim Pawrbo" (Last Chapter). In this season hoichoi released five new episodes. In this season, the cast almost remained same like the first season except Tiya, which is now played by Mishmee Das while Solanki Roy in first. Also, this time the season is directed by Joydeep Mukherjee.

=== Season 2 Episodes ===
No.	Title	Directed by	Original release date
1	"Bohurupi"	Joydeep Mukherjee	4 June 2021
2	"Chabikathi"	Joydeep Mukherjee	4 June 2021
3	"Sondhikhon"	Joydeep Mukherjee	4 June 2021
4	"Obhisondhi"	Joydeep Mukherjee	4 June 2021
5	"Uposonghar"	Joydeep Mukherjee	4 June 2021
