= Nirbhaya (film) =

2021 Bengali- language drama film

- নির্ভয়া
- Directed by: Anshuman Pratyush
- Produced by: Anshuman Pratyush
- Starring: Hiya Dey; Gaurav Chakrabarty; Priyanka Sarkar
- Production company: Pratyush Productions
- Release date: 12 November 2021
- Country: India
- Language: Bengali

Nirbhaya is an Indian Bengali language drama film written and directed by Anshuman Pratyush. The film is produced by Amrik Entertainment Space and Pratyush Productions. The film stars Gaurav Chakrabarty, Priyanka Sarkar, Sabyasachi Chakrabarty, Sreelekha Mitra and Shantilal Mukherjee in key roles. The film was released on 12 November 2021.

Nirbhaya is a courtroom drama that calls attention to the need to improve the laws and the judicial system to support rape survivors who are minors.

== Cast ==
- Hiya Dey as Piyali
- Gaurav Chakrabarty as Hrithik Dutt
- Priyanka Sarkar as Aratrika Dutt
- Shantilal Mukherjee as Ritobrato
- Sreelekha Mitra as Volunteer worker
- Sabyasachi Chakrabarty as Justice

== Soundtrack ==
No	Title	Artist	Length
1	Mene Newa Jay Naki	Pratik Kundu	2:46
2	Pagol Mon	Pratik Kundu	2:24
3	Onek Kotha Baki	Pratik Kundu & Akriti Kakkar	4:33
4	Jawkhon Eka Lage	Ananya Chakraborty	3:54
