= Maya Satya Bhram =

2026 Indian Bengali film

- Theatrical release poster
- Directed by: Samik Roy Choudhury
- Written by: Samik Roy Choudhury
- Produced by: Indrani Chattopadhyay; Sanat Chattopadhyay; Samik Roy Choudhury
- Starring: Sanat Chattopadhyay; Priyanka Sarkar; Soham Majumdar; Alexandra Taylor
- Cinematography: Prosenjit Koley
- Edited by: Sanglap Bhowmik
- Music by: Tamal Kanti Haldar
- Production companies: Pinrin Film Production; White Hole Creations
- Release date: August 28, 2026 (India)
- Running time: 134 minutes
- Country: India
- Language: Bengali

Maya Satya Bhram (Bengali pronunciation: [maː.jaː sə.t̪jə bʱɾəm]; transl. Illusion Truth Confusion) is an 2026 Indian Bengali-language psychological thriller, written and directed by Samik Roy Choudhury. It stars Soham Majumdar, Priyanka Sarkar and Sanat Chattopadhyay in lead roles alongside Alexandra Taylor, Paran Bandopadhyay and Debesh Roychowdhury in supporting role. The film premiered at the 2026 New York Indian Film Festival.

== Synopsis ==
Two chilling disappearances in the past seven months have cast a shadow over the Prafulla Nagar police station in Kolkata, shaking its very foundations. The first victim is Totoro, the eight-year-old son of Sub-Inspector Sanjay Konwar. The second is Sara, a Swedish film production assistant and researcher, who had travelled to India to study shamans. At first blush, the two cases appear unrelated—until a disturbing investigation connects them both to a mysterious and enigmatic figure known as Trilokadarshi Baba.

Sara had been interviewing Trilokadarshi for four days before vanishing without a trace. Her research, meticulously documented on her laptop, soon emerges as a critical lead. As Sanjay listens to the haunting recordings, his wife, Urmila, stumbles upon a televised exposé branding Trilokadarshi as a fraudulent mystic. But as Sanjay delves deeper into the shaman’s past through a biographical interview, he unearths something far more unsettling—something that defies conventional understanding and threatens to unravel the fabric of reality itself.

== Cast ==
- Sanat Chattopadhyay as Trilokadarshi Baba
- Priyanka Sarkar as Urmila Konwar, Inspector Sanjay Konwar’s wife
- Soham Majumdar as Inspector Sanjay Konwar
- Alexandra Taylor as Sara Nilsen, a Swedish film production assistant
- Paran Bandopadhyay as Sarkar Dadu
- Debesh Roychowdhury as Aghori
- Subhrajit Dutta as Kana Prasen
- Sreya Bhattacharyya as Srestha Mondal
- Soumya Majumdar as Young Adult Tilu (Trilokadarshi Baba)
- Sankhadeep Banerjee as Young Tilu

== Production ==
=== Development and Casting ===
Following the success of his previous film Beline, writer-director Samik Roy Choudhury conceptualized and wrote the script for Maya Satya Bhram during a retreat in the mountains. Priyanka Sarkar was ultimately cast alongside Soham Mojumdar, who secured the male lead after several other prominent actors were approached.

=== Filming ===
Pre-production for the project, which included extensive cast workshops and brainstorming sessions, was already underway by November 2024. Principal photography was scheduled to begin shortly after, with the production team planning to continue shooting through the New Year period.

== Official Selection ==
- Cannes Film Festival, 2026
- Premier at New York Indian Film Festival, 2026
- Indian Film Festival of Melbourne, 2026

=== Winner ===
- Best Film, Best Cinematography and Best Actor won at Montreal Independent Film Festival, 2026

== Soundtrack ==
The soundtrack of this film has been composed by Tamal Kanti Haldar and the lyrics have been penned by Pralay Sarkar.

No.	Title	Lyrics	Singer	Length
1	Khukumonir Be	Pralay Sarkar	Lagnajita Chakraborty	03:26
2	Ar Koto Poth	Tamal Kanti Halder	Rupam Islam	03:47
3	Khabar Pabo Koi	Pralay Sarkar	Silajit Majumder	03:16
4	Mayadesh	Pralay Sarkar	Timir Biswas and Shrestha Das	03:57
5	Lukochuri	Tamal Kanti Halder	Tamal Kanti Halder	04:24
6	Khabar Pabo Koi/Sutton Sutton	Pralay Sarkar	Silajit Majumder and Lagnajita Chakraborty	03:43
7	Sroter Taane	Tamal Kanti Halder	Riyan Halder	02:19
