= Prem Shots =

2026 Indian Bengali web series

- Genre: New-age romance; Drama
- Written by: Neha Anand; Victor Mukherjee; Meghatithi Banerjee
- Directed by: Srimanta Sengupta
- Starring: Bonny Sengupta; Angana Roy; Shreya Gupto; Debdutta Raha
- Country of origin: India
- No. of episodes: 6

Production
- Producers: Prantik Basu; Neha Anand
- Production company: Maverixx Production

Original release
- Network: ZEE5
- Release: 24 July 2026

Prem Shots is a 2026 Indian Bengali language romantic drama web series directed by Srimanta Sengupta. It stars Bonny Sengupta and Angana Roy in their first on-screen pairing, with Shreya Gupto and Debdutta Raha in supporting roles. The six-episode series premiered on ZEE5's Bangla platform on 24 July 2026.

== Plot ==
Sylva who is a graphic designer ends her engagement to Rhiju rather than enter into a marriage arranged by her family. Later in Kolkata, she meets Ayush who is a cafe owner who has kept his distance from serious relationships since his breakup with Madhurima. Ayush discovers that someone connected to Sylva's past has been watching her. His attempts to identify the person draw both of them into unresolved parts of their lives. Sylva's history with Rhiju resurfaces, while Ayush is forced to confront his past with Madhurima, testing their relationship as they try to move forward together.

== Cast ==
- Bonny Sengupta as Ayush
- Angana Roy as Sylva
- Shreya Gupto as Madhurima
- Debdutta Raha as Rhiju
- Rajat Ganguly as Ayush's father
- Anindya Sain as Neel
- Nandini Dutta as Aditi, Ayush's former girlfriend
- Jeet Sundar as Tanmoy
- Aratrika Sen as Rusha
- Shinjinee Chakraborty as Sohini
- Ayendri Roy as Tanaya

== Episodes ==
No.	Title	Directed by	Written by	Original release date
1	"Arnica"	Srimanta Sengupta	Meghatithi Banerjee, Samragnee Bandyopadhyay & Victor Mukherjee	24 July 2026
While catering his former girlfriend Aditi's wedding reception, Ayush meets Sylva, a graphic designer, and the two spend the evening together before she leaves without giving him a way to reach her. Later that night, two men attack Ayush on an isolated road.
2	"Match/Unmatch"	Srimanta Sengupta	Meghatithi Banerjee, Samragnee Bandyopadhyay & Victor Mukherjee	24 July 2026
Ayush and Sylva meet again after being matched by mistake on a dating app. An unidentified man is shown observing Sylva, and a misunderstanding complicates their renewed contact.
3	"Red Flag Bride"	Srimanta Sengupta	Meghatithi Banerjee, Samragnee Bandyopadhyay & Victor Mukherjee	24 July 2026
A flashback shows Sylva ending her engagement to Rhiju. In the present, she has an anxiety attack linked to that memory, and Ayush tells her she is being watched by someone. Following an incident at her apartment, Ayush encounters something that leaves him shaken.
4	"Pookie Prem"	Srimanta Sengupta	Meghatithi Banerjee, Samragnee Bandyopadhyay & Victor Mukherjee	24 July 2026
A flashback shows the beginning of Ayush's relationship with Madhurima three years earlier. In the present, Madhurima asks him not to tell Sylva about their history. Following a break-in at Sylva's home, Ayush works to identify who has been following her, and the episode ends by revealing who is responsible.
5	"Ex Factor"	Srimanta Sengupta	Meghatithi Banerjee, Samragnee Bandyopadhyay & Victor Mukherjee	24 July 2026
A flashback set eleven months earlier shows Rhiju's reaction to Sylva ending their engagement and his intention to win her back. In the present, Ayush and Sylva continue investigating who has been monitoring her, and further details connect Rhiju to her past relationships. Their progress is interrupted by an unexpected arrival.
6	"Last Shot"	Srimanta Sengupta	Meghatithi Banerjee, Samragnee Bandyopadhyay & Victor Mukherjee	24 July 2026
Rhiju's role in the surveillance of Sylva is revealed, and Ayush and Sylva begin to repair strained family relationships. A secret from Ayush's own past then comes to light, and Sylva has to decide how to respond to it.

== Reception ==
The Times of India described Prem Shots as a contemporary romantic series centred on Generation Z's approach to relationships and personal independence. The review praised the lead performances, particularly those of Bonny Sengupta and Angana Roy, and commended the series' modern storytelling."

Reviewing the series for Sangbad Pratidin, Swati Chattopadhyay Bhowmik wrote that Prem Shots explores the outlook and relationships of Generation Z and challenges several conventional Bengali social stereotypes. The review also commended the performances of Bonny Sengupta and Angana Roy, along with the series' writing and cinematography.
