= Priyanka Sarkar =

Indian Bengali actress

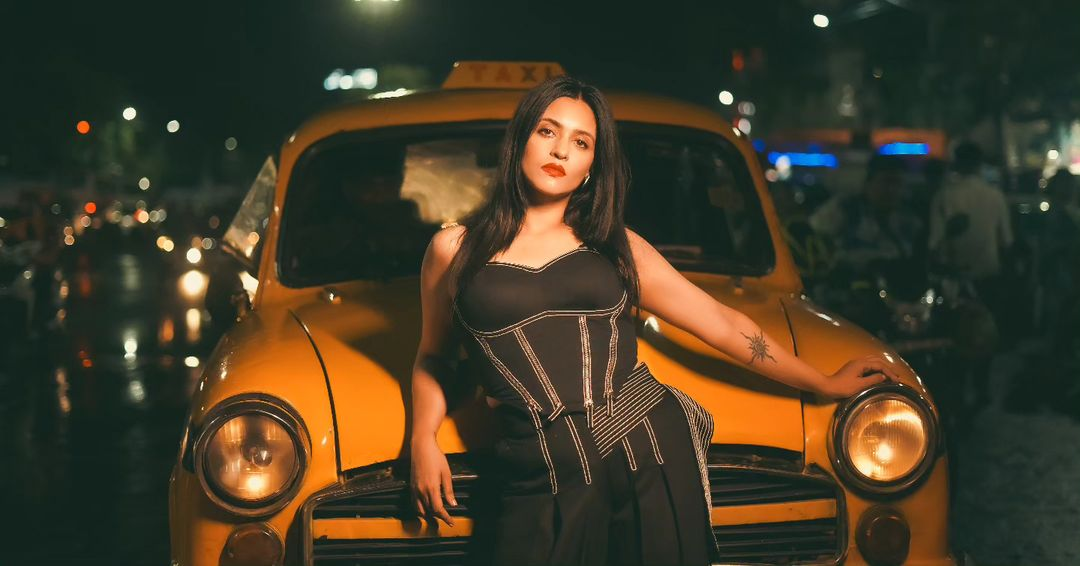
- Sarkar in 2024
- Born: 31 December 1990 (age 35); Kolkata, West Bengal, India
- Occupation: Actress
- Spouse: Rahul Banerjee (m. 2010; died 2026)
- Children: 1

Priyanka Sarkar (born 31 December 1990) is an Indian film and television actress who mostly works in Bengali films. She started her career working in the Bengali television industry in 2003 while she was only 12 years old. Later she worked in several serials like Swapner Rong Nil, Aastha, Khela, and Nana R angar Dinguli as a teenager. Her first big screen venture was Dadar Adesh (2005) alongside Prasenjit Chatterjee. Her big career breakthrough came when she got the opportunity to star in the movie Chirodini Tumi Je Amar as the leading actress. The film released in 2008 and went on to become one of the biggest blockbusters in the Bengali film industry.

== Personal life ==
Sarkar was born on 31 December 1990 in West Bengal, India. She married actor Rahul Banerjee in 2010 and has a son named Shohoj since 2013. They separated in 2017 and reunited in 2023, living together till Banerjee's untimely death whilst filming in Talsari beach by drowning, on 29 March 2026, at the age of 42.

== Career ==
Sarkar debuted with the film Dadar Adesh (2005). Her breakthrough performance came in Chirodini Tumi Je Amar (2008), in which she was paired opposite Rahul Banerjee. The film was well received by audiences.

== Filmography ==
Key
†	Denotes films that have not yet been released

Year	Film	Role	Director	Notes
2005	Dadar Adesh	Titli Roy	Anup Sengupta	
2008	Chirodini Tumi Je Amar	Pallavi	Raj Chakraborty	
2009	Ei Prithibi Tomar Aamar	Purnima	Swapan Saha	
2009	Risk	Mithie	Riingo Banerjee	
2009	Bhalobasha Zindabad	Kushum	Reshmi Mitra	
2009	Kano Kichu Kotha Bolona	Rajashree	Swapan Saha	
2010	Love Circus	Riya	Dulal Bhowmick	
2010	Shono Mon Boli Tomay		Pradip Saha	
2010	Pratidwandi	Sharmila	Anup Sengupta	
2010	Bor Bou Khela		Jagannath Guha	
2010	Game		Sudipto Ghatak, Ajay Singh	
2010	Hangover	Herself	Prabhat Roy	
2010	Run	Megha	Swapan Saha	
2010	Jodi Ekdin	Nikita Choudary	Riingo Banerjee	
2011	Get 2 Gether	Riya	Arindam Chakraborty	
2011	Kagojer Bou	Ketuki	Bappaditya Bandopadhyay	
2011	Moubone Aaj	Payel	Raja Sen	
2012	Na Hannyate		Riingo Banerjee	
2012	Hemlock Society	Hiya	Srijit Mukherji	
2013	Damadol	Riya	Manoj Michigan	
2013	Hoi Choi	Tupur	Debarati Gupta	
2013	A Political Murder		Agnidev Chatterjee	
2014	The Royal Bengal Tiger	Aparna	Rajesh Ganguly	
2014	Obhishopto Nighty	Jhumi	Birsa Dasgupta	
2015	Swade Ahlade		Arindam Sil	
2015	13 No. Tarachand Lane		Kamaleshwar Mukherjee	
2015	Rajkahini	Lata	Srijit Mukherji	
2015	Byomkesh Bakshi	Indira	Anjan Dutt	
2015	Abby Sen	Sreeroopa	Atanu Ghosh	
2015	Arshinagar	Mrs. Gupta / Herself	Aparna Sen	
2016	Tadanto		Nitish Roy	
2016	Jenana		Barshali Chatterjee	
2016	It's Basonto		Aditya Roy Banerjee	
2016	9 No. Peyara Bagan Lane		Pallab Mukherjee; Ratri Ghatak	
2016	Pichutaan		Ayan Chakraborty	
2016	Selfie'r Phande	Srabani	Manas Basu	
2016	Byomkesh O Chiriyakhana	Banalakshi	Anjan Dutt	
2016	Romantic Noy		Rajib Choudhury	
2017	Ghostana		Saptarshi Majumdar	
2017	Ping		Saptarshi Majumdar	
2017	Baje Chobi		Arnab Paria	
2017	Amar Sahor	Dipayan Jenny	Sourav Chakraborty, Samadarshi Dutta, Priyanka Sarkar, Sampurna Lahiri, Shilajit Majumdar, Rudranil Ghosh	
2017	Amar Aponjon	Piya	Raja Chanda	
2017	Chaamp	Shwati	Raj Chakraborty	
2017	Jawker Dhan		Sayantan Ghosal	
2017	Chaya O Chobi	Moumita	Kaushik Ganguly	
2017	Cockpit	Afreen Hamidi	Kamaleshwar Mukherjee	
2018	Kaya-The Mystery Unfold		Rajib Chowdhury	
2018	Hoyto Manush Noy		Koustav Bhattacharya and Arunava Gangopadhyay	
2018	Kabir	Damayanti	Aniket Chattopadhyay	
2018	E Tumi Kemon Tumi		Nehal Dutta	
2018	Sultan: The Saviour	Disha	Raja Chanda	
2018	Bhagshesh		Maahirii Bose	
2018	Aaleya		Dr. Humayun Kabir	
2018	Crisscross	Suzy	Birsa Dasgupta	
2018	Byomkesh Gotro	Emily	Arindam Sil	
2019	Bibaho Obhijaan	Malati	Birsa Dasgupta	
2019	Bornoporichoy	Malini Chatterjee	Mainak Bhowmick	
2020	Hridoy Jurey	Nilima	Rafique Sikder	Debut in Bangladeshi film
2021	Pratighat		Rajiv Kumar Biswas	Zee5 Release
2021	Nirbhaya	Aratrika	Anshuman Pratyush	
2022	Kolkatar Harry		Rajdeep Ghosh	
2022	Toke Chhara Banchbo Na		Sujit Mondal	
2023	Manobjomin	Kuhu	Srijato	
2023	Abar Bibaho Obhijaan	Malati	Soumik Halder	
2023	Kurban	Hijol	Saibal Mukherjee	
2024	Aahalya		Abhimanyu Mukherjee	
2024	Robins Kichen		Bappa	
2025	Mrigaya: The Hunt		Abhirup Ghosh	
2026	Phera	Palash's ex-wife	Pritha Chakraborty	
2026	Maya Satya Bhram		Samik Roy Choudhury	
2026	Bike Ambulance Dada †	TBA	Vinay M Mudgil	Filming
2026	Khalnayak †	TBA	Vicky Zahed	Filming; Bangladeshi film

== Television ==
- Aastha
- Khela (Zee Bangla)
- Raat Bhor Brishti (Zee Bangla)
- Nana Ranger Dinguli
- Ebar Jalsha Rannaghare
- Mahanayak
- Ebar Jalsha Rannaghare (season 2)
- Abhyamangal (Mahalaya special TV program for Star Jalsha)
- Sun Bangla Super Family (reality game show for Sun Bangla)

== Web series ==
Year	Series	OTT	Character	Ref.
2017–2021	Hello!	Hoichoi	Deboleena Shome / Neena	
2019	Rahasya Romancha Series	Hoichoi		
2022	Mahabharat Murders	Hoichoi	Ruksana Ahmed	
2024	Lojja	Hoichoi	Jaya Sinha	
2023	Chhotolok	Zee5	Mallika Das	
2025	Lojja 2	Hoichoi	Jaya Sinha	
2026	Taarkata	ZEE5	Chhanda	
2026	Kuheli	Hoichoi	DSP Agni Basu	
