= Ganoshotru =

- Official poster
- Genre: Crime thriller
- Based on: Real criminal cases from West Bengal
- Directed by: Samik Roy Choudhury; Modhura Palit; Sayan Dasgupta; Abhirup Ghosh; Srimanta Sengupta
- Starring: Paoli Dam; Rudranil Ghosh; Ayush Das; Debopriyo Mukherjee; Subrata Dutta
- Country of origin: India
- Original language: Bengali
- No. of episodes: 5

Original release
- Network: ZEE5

Ganoshotru is an Indian Bengali-language crime thriller anthology web series. The series presents five standalone stories based on real criminal cases from West Bengal, exploring the circumstances that led ordinary individuals to commit crimes. It is directed by Samik Roy Choudhury, Modhura Palit, Sayan Dasgupta, Abhirup Ghosh, and Srimanta Sengupta, and stars Paoli Dam, Rudranil Ghosh, Ayush Das, Debopriyo Mukherjee, and Subrata Dutta. The series is scheduled to premiere on 31 October 2025 on ZEE5.

== Premise ==
Each episode dramatizes the rise and downfall of a figure drawn from Bengal's criminal history, weaving together factual details and creative storytelling. The narratives include portrayals of Troilokya Devi, considered one of India's first documented female serial killers; Hubba Shyamal, a Hooghly-based gangster; Sajal Barui, convicted of parricide; "Chainman", notoriously known for killing with bicycle chains; and Rashid Khan, linked to the 1993 Bowbazar blast.

== Cast ==
- Paoli Dam as Troilokya Devi
- Rudranil Ghosh as Hubba Shyamal
- Ayush Das as Sajal Barui
- Debopriyo Mukherjee as The Chainman
- Subrata Dutta as Rashid Khan

== Development ==
Each episode was helmed by a different director—Madhura Palit (Troilokya Devi), Sayan Dasgupta (Rashid Khan), Samik Roy Choudhury (Sajal Barui), Abhirup Ghosh (The Chainman), and Srimanta Sengupta (Hubba Shyamal).

== Release and marketing ==
The motion poster of Ganoshotru was released on 19 October 2025. The series is scheduled for release on 31 October 2025 on ZEE5.
