= Parineeta (2024 TV series) =

2024 Indian Bengali web series

- Release poster
- Based on: Parineeta by Sarat Chandra Chattopadhyay
- Developed by: Sarbari Ghosal
- Screenplay by: Sarbari Ghosal
- Story by: Sarbari Ghosal
- Dialogues by: Sarbari Ghosal
- Directed by: Aditi Roy
- Starring: Debchandrima Singha Roy; Gaurav Chakrabarty
- Theme music composer: Indraadip Dasgupta
- Country of origin: India
- Original language: Bengali
- No. of seasons: 1
- No. of episodes: 6

Production
- Cinematography: Ramyadeep Saha
- Editor: Subhajit Singha
- Camera setup: Single-camera
- Running time: 24-30 minutes
- Production company: Shree Venkatesh Films

Original release
- Release: 15 August 2024

Parineeta is a 2024 Indian Bengali romantic drama web series directed by Aditi Roy. It has been adapted by Sarbari Ghosal from Sarat Chandra Chattopadhyay's novel Parineeta. The series stars Debchandrima Singha Roy and Gaurav Chakrabarty in the lead roles. It has been produced under the banner of Shree Venkatesh Films. The timeline of the series has been set in 1905-1908 during the Partition of Bengal, which is different from the original timeline of 1914-1915 mentioned in the novel.

Principal photography was done within a short schedule of 17 days. It was the second web series that was released as a part of Hoichoi's Best of Bengal series. Indraadip Dasgupta has composed the background score of the series while Rabindra Sangeets have been used as the songs in the soundtrack. Ramyadip Saha has done the cinematography while Subhajit Singha has handled the editing. The series is streaming on the Bengali OTT platoform Hoichoi from 15 August 2024.

== Synopsis ==
Lalita is a young orphan who lives with her uncle Gurucharan and his family. She shares a close but complicated bond with Shekhar, the younger son of their neighbour Nabin Roy. Shekhar's family is also fond of Lalita, especially his mother Bhuvaneshwari.

Things change when Girin, a relative of Gurucharan's neighbour, arrives at their house. Girin helps Gurucharan financially and also takes an interest in Lalita's future. His growing presence makes Shekhar jealous. So he and Lalita gets married secretly.

Gurucharan, influenced by Girin, adopts Brahmoism. As Shekhar struggles with jealousy and his own doubts, he begins treating Lalita badly. Hurt by his behaviour, Lalita leaves for Monghyr with her family. The rest of the story follows the misunderstandings between the two and how they eventually overcome them.

== Cast ==
- Gaurav Chakrabarty as Shekhar, the younger son of Nabin Roy
- Debchandrima Singha Roy as Lalita, an orphan who lives with her uncle
- Debdut Ghosh as Gurucharan, Lalita's uncle
- Lokenath Dey as Nabin Roy, Gurucharan's neighbour
- Pushpita Mukherjee as Bhuvaneshwari, Nabin's wife
- Arpan Ghoshal as Girin, Gurucharan's neighbour Charu's relative
- Mimi Dutta as Shekhar's sister-in-law

== Episodes ==
No.	Title	Directed by	Written by	Original release date
1	"Bohu Juger Opaar Hotey"	Aditi Roy	Sarbari Ghosal	15 August 2024
2	"Purano Shei Diner Kotha"	Aditi Roy	Sarbari Ghosal	15 August 2024
3	"Shuk Sari"	Aditi Roy	Sarbari Ghosal	15 August 2024
4	"Michhey Obhiman"	Aditi Roy	Sarbari Ghosal	15 August 2024
5	"Robey Na Goponey"	Aditi Roy	Sarbari Ghosal	15 August 2024
6	"Tumi Sondharo Meghomala"	Aditi Roy	Sarbari Ghosal	15 August 2024

== Production ==
Debchandrima said that she spent a month wearing a saree at home to get accustomed to her character in the series. She also practiced the way people spoke during the period depicted in the story. She repeatedly went through the script as well as the original novel on which the series is based.

== Marketing ==
The teaser of Parineeta was released on 20 July 2024. The trailer of the series was released on 5 August 2024. The trailer launch event was held at the Nat Mandir, Shobhabazar in North Kolkata.

== Reception ==
=== Critical reception ===
Shamyita Chakraborty of OTTplay rated the series 3/5 stars and opined "Parineeta is a pure love story presented on an engaging platter. It's well made and arguably Aditi's best series on Hoichoi." She appreciated the director's attempt to present her own version of Parineeta which she termed as "engaging and entertaining", the costume design, the set design, the lighting, the cinematography, the music, the non-linear storyline, the performance of the lead duo but beamoned the below par dialogue writing and few forced expressions.

Agnivo Niyogi of The Telegraph reviewed the series and wrote "Director Aditi Roy avoids over-dramatisation and opts for a more restrained approach that respects the source material. Through a meticulous recreation of the period’s cultural and political milieu, Hoichoi's Parineeta is able to transport viewers to the early 20th century." She applauded the series for adding elements of the then anti-colonial movement into the storyline of the original novel and the performances of Gaurav and Debchandrima.

Snigdha Dey of Aajkal reviewed the series and noted "To break apart from the familiar story of a timeless novel which has found its way onto the big screen several times and tell it in a different way takes courage. Aditi Roy has shown that courage." She praised the director's prudence in adding a new touch despite maintaining the original storyline, the new backdrop, realistic character portrayals, the sets, the clothes, Gaurav's performance and the performance of the supporting cast but bemoaned the excessive number of songs, and Debchandrima's weak diction and below par acting.

Archi Sengupta of Leisure Byte rated the series 3.5/5 stars and wrote "Hoichoi's series based on Sarat Chandra Chattopadhyay’s novel is a well-done affair that looks at the events of the novel in a different light. Although the series is one episode too long with the stolen glances, not talking clearly and whatnot, it’s an interesting addition that is both engaging and enraging to watch."
