= Hubba (film) =

2024 Indian Bengali-language film

- Directed by: Bratya Basu
- Written by: Bratya Basu
- Produced by: Firdausul Hasan; Probal Halder
- Starring: Mosharraf Karim; Indraneil Sengupta
- Cinematography: Soumik Haldar
- Edited by: Sanglap Bhowmik
- Music by: Prabuddha Banerjee
- Production company: Friends Communication
- Distributed by: PVR Inox Pictures; Jaaz Multimedia
- Release date: 19 January 2024
- Country: India
- Language: Bengali

Hubba is a 2024 Indian Bengali-language biographical action crime film written and directed by Bratya Basu. Produced by Firdausul Hasan and Probal Halder under the banner of Friends Communication, It stars Mosharraf Karim in the titular role, alongside Indraneil Sengupta in lead roles, while Loknath Dey, Anujoy Chatterjee, Zinnia Roy and Asmita Mukherjee play another pivotal roles, with Kanchan Mullick in a special appearance. It revolves around the evolution of Bimal Das alias Hubba who later becomes a notorious gangster of Hooghly.

Hubba is based on the life of the Hooghly based gangster Shyamal Das aka Hubba Shyamal, while the character in the film was portrayed as Hubba Bimal and Hooghly respectively. Principal Photography commenced in September 2022 with a sporadic in Kolkata, Hooghly and Howrah, while wrapped up in November 2022. Music of the film is composed by Prabuddha Banerjee, while Soumik Halder handled its cinematography and Sanglap Bhowmik edited the film. It marks Basu's second collaboration with Karim.

Hubba was released on 19 January 2024 simultaneously in West Bengal and Bangladesh.

== Synopsis ==
Hubba revolves around the life of Hubba Bimal, a notorious gangster from Konnagar, West Bengal who earned the moniker 'Dawood Ibrahim of Hooghly.' The film delves into Shyamal's multifaceted life, spanning criminal activities such as murder, brawls, drug smuggling, and even his brief foray into politics between 2004-2005.

== Cast ==
- Mosharraf Karim as Shyamal Das a.k.a. Hubba Shyamal
  - Gambhira Bhattacharya as Young Shyamal
- Indraneil Sengupta as Dibakar Sen, Police Officer
- Loknath Dey as Bokaro Bapi
- Anujoy Chatterjee as Umesh Mahato, Hubba's most trusted sidekick
- Zinnia Roy as Tapasi, Hubba's 1st wife
- Asmita Mukherjee as Mitali, Hubba's 2nd wife
- Sumit Kumar Roy as Sumon
- Raj Rakhal as Chandan Saha a.k.a. Chikuya
- Shantanu Ganguly as Joydeb
- Abhi Sengupta as Balai
- Atanu Sarkar as the security of Hubba's flat in Konnagar
- Kanchan Mullick as Special appearance

== Release ==
Hubba was released on 19 January 2024. The film's trailer, released on 23 December 2023, has captured widespread attention.

== Reception ==
=== Critical reception ===
Hindustan Times rated the film 4.5 out of 5 stars and wrote "The acting of Mosharraf Karim and Indraneil Sengupta is absolutely perfect. The background score, songs and raw action scenes keeps the audience tightly bound to their seats." He praised the director for successfully depicting the true stories, keeping the commercial tone intact. Anandabazar Patrika wrote "Hubba is the desi story of a desi gangster. Although there is evident weakness in the acting of other characters and some loopholes in the story, the action scenes were worthy." The Times of India rated the film 3 out of 5 stars and praised the performance of Mosharraf for bringing the character to live. He said "The screenplay, cinematography, ruthlessness and background score makes it worthy watch."
