= Shei Je Holud Pakhi =

2018 Bengali web series

- Release poster
- Genre: Musical Thriller
- Directed by: Anirban Mallik (Season 1), Joydeep Mukherjee (Season 2)
- Music by: Raja Narayan Deb
- Country of origin: India
- Original language: Bengali
- No. of seasons: 2
- No. of episodes: 15

Production
- Production company: Eyewash Production

Original release
- Release: 30 June 2018 – 14 April 2021

Shei Je Holud Pakhi is a musical thriller Bengali web series directed by Anirban Mallick.

This series marked Tridha Choudhury's come back in the Bengali entertainment industry after two years. In this web series, she played the central character of Vaidehi. The series also stars Saswata Chatterjee in a pivotal role.

The first season was released on the Bengali OTT platform Hoichoi on 30 June 2018. The second season — Shei Je Holud Pakhi 2 was released on 14 April 2021 on Hoichoi.

== Synopsis ==
The story centers around Somnath Maitra, a police officer who lost his daughter Mitil five years ago. Now he is trying to connect to his daughter through the lead singer of Band Euthanasia, Vaidehi. Vaidehi promises him that the last song of her concert will be Mitil's song but she breaks her promise and later goes out for her regular drive after the concert. Somnath follows her only to witness her car crash. The media accuses him for her death.

== Cast ==
- Tridha Choudhury as Vaidehi/Ida
- Saswata Chatterjee as Inspector Somnath Maitra
- Gourab Chatterjee as Dipto
- Bidipta Chakraborty as Karuna, Vaidehi's mother.
- Sudip Mukherjee as Commissioner of Police Sudeep Chatterjee
- Kaushik Sen as Diganto Basu (Season 2)
- Rupanjana Mitra as Inspector Anuradha (Season 2)
- Chandrayee Ghosh as Jonaki Ganguli (Season 2)
- Prantik Banerjee as Rik Chatterjee (Season 2)
- Somraj Maity as Onir
- Indranil Mullick as Bingo
- Angana Roy as Mitil
- Debdut Ghosh as Pramatha Chowdhury
- Arnab Banerjee as Birsa
- Shoumo Banerjee as Inspector Kaushik
- Manasi Sengupta as Suhina
- Arunava Dey as Tito/Suman Debnath

== Episodes ==
Series	Episodes	Originally released
1	7	30 June 2018
2	8	14 April 2021

== Season 1 (2018) ==
The first season of Shei Je Holud Pakhi started streaming on hoichoi on 30 June 2018 with 7 episodes.

No.	Title	Directed by	Original release date
1	"Golpo Amar Phurolo"	Anirban Mallik	30 June 2018
2	"Ichchamrityu"	Anirban Mallik	30 June 2018
3	"Moyna Todonto"	Anirban Mallik	30 June 2018
4	"Girgiti"	Anirban Mallik	30 June 2018
5	"Rongbodoler Holi"	Anirban Mallik	30 June 2018
6	"Aaj tobe khoma koro"	Anirban Mallik	30 June 2018
7	"Ekshalikh"	Anirban Mallik	30 June 2018

== Season 2 (2021) ==
On 14 April 2021 hoichoi released the second season of the series with brand new eight episodes.

No.	Title	Directed by	Original release date
1	"Kalo Shomuddur"	Joydip Mukherjee	14 April 2021
2	"Boka Bhalobasha"	Joydip Mukherjee	14 April 2021
3	"Tomay Gaan Shonabo"	Joydip Mukherjee	14 April 2021
4	"Jonaki"	Joydip Mukherjee	14 April 2021
5	"Group Photograph"	Joydip Mukherjee	14 April 2021
6	"Aswathama"	Joydip Mukherjee	14 April 2021
7	"Pitriporichoy"	Joydeep Mukherjee	14 April 2021
8	"Golpo Ebar Phurolo"	Joydeep Mukherjee	14 April 2021
