= Hubba Shyamal =

Indian gangster and crime boss (1966–2011)

- Das wearing a white kurta and sunglasses.
- Born: Shyamal Das c. 1966; Konnagar, Hooghly, West Bengal, India
- Disappeared: May 29, 2011
- Died: June 2, 2011 (aged 44–45); Rishra, Hooghly
- Cause of death: Stabbed
- Body discovered: Baidyabati
- Other name: "Dawood Ibrahim of Hooghly"
- Years active: 1980–2011
- Television: Hubba, Ganoshotru
- Conviction: Murder (26 counts)
- Accomplices: Ratan Ray; Benarasi Bapi; Ramesh Mahato (formerly)
- Time at large: Late 1990s

Details
- Victims: 52+
- State: West Bengal
- Killed: 30+
- Weapons: Chopper; Revolver
- Date apprehended: December 21, 2005; October 23, 2008; February 20, 2011
- Imprisoned at: Uttarpara Police Station; Dankuni Police Station

Shyamal Das (Note: English: /shæmʌll dɑːs/ Sham-ull Das Bengali: [ʃæmol das] Sham-ol Das) (1966 – June 2, 2011), more popularly known as "Hubba Shyamal" (Note: English: /həbbɑː/ Hub-ba Bengali: [hu̯bba] Hoob-ba) was an Indian gangster, crime boss, murderer, rampage killer and convicted criminal from Hooghly district in West Bengal. He started committing serious crimes from the 1980s which include murder, robbery, theft, extortion and drug trafficking of many victims. He was known as the "Dawood Ibrahim of Hooghly". He was involved in the real estate business and also ran a gang. His biographical film named Hubba was directed by Bratya Basu. His gang's crimes materialized in the districts of Hooghly, Howrah and North 24 Parganas and also the capital Kolkata. His gang consisted of more than a hundred members when he was alive. Das was originally from ward no. 2 of Konnagar. He was known for his unique style of 'Poite Cut'. (Note: 'Poite Cut' can be defined as a cut from a knife or sharp weapon from a victim's left shoulder to the right side of the waist or from the right shoulder to the left side of the waist, employed periodically as the style by Hubba Shyamal.) His body was discovered in a canal in Baidyabati in 2011.

Das started his career by robbing train wagons. He later performed critical murders, drug trafficking and assets theft from closed factories. He recruited many skilled henchmen into his gang. He fled Konnagar after being convicted of multiple murders and crimes. While out, Das had informers present in Konnagar and Rishra who gave him police info secretly. He became a millionaire in the meantime from robberies and stealing and from his real estate business. For many years, he controlled the markets and lands of south Hooghly while remaining out of sight. Other than Hooghly, he operated secondarily in Howrah, (Note: Includes Howrah railway station and the district.) Kolkata and North 24 Parganas district. Das was not found or charged until his first arrest in 2005 in Kolkata, where he stayed for 2 years. He was detained a total of three times, once in 2008 and 2011, getting out using bail all three times.

== Career ==
=== Early life ===
'Hubba' Shyamal Das was born in Konnagar city of Hooghly district in a rented house in 1966. (Note: He was about 45 at the time of his death in 2011.) His father worked in a cotton factory. Das only wanted to study till third grade and rarely went to school after that. He would spend his time sitting beside railway lines and watching freight trains pass. He would help his mother weave cloth as she worked as a textile weaver. He dropped out of school at fifth grade. When he was 14, he smoked bidi and bought drugs. He told his father that he would rather rob wagons of freight trains rather than do labor work and started robbing wagons from 16. He first robbed machines from a nearby Imperial Chemical Industries factory in the night.

=== 1984–Mid 1990s ===
==== First murder and forming of the gang ====
In 1984, an employee of the factory was returning with his bicycle, carrying a bag of money. Das asked him to hand all of the money over. When he refused, Das stabbed him with a knife and ran away with the money. The locals reported to the local police station. Das temporarily fled the area being pressured and suspected. Das had to leave the neighborhood for a long time after the police raided his house in the mid-80s. He sent a letter to an eighth grade girl, Tapsi, he had a relationship with, who lived natively in Konnagar. He took her away from her home at night after one or two years and they married in the local temple (mandir).

By the 1990s, Das's main motive was to rob assets from closed industrial factories in the area, forming his own gang for making things easier. Ramesh Mahato used to work as a paid writer. He met Das at a gambling site, formed friendship and he became the second most important person in the gang after Das. The third most important was Benarasi Bapi, originally from Varanasi, who Das met at a criminal hideout in Liluah and was immediately recruited into the gang. Another criminal was Nepu Giri, a criminal from the start, he became a hired professional killer for Das, he followed Das's killing orders without any hesitation.

==== Bindal Paper Mill ====
Das made a choice that he would return to his authentic house in Konnagar, in the mid-90s with his now-large gang. He had planned to rob a recently closed Bindal Paper Mill, valuing well over one lakh rupees. He took a different method of stealing than how he normally would, letting other criminals under surveillance from his gang members steal the goods and bring them to Shyamal Das. He marked that anyone could rob material anytime from the factory, but it must go to Das. Shyamal Das sold the stolen (smuggled) goods to the market at half the then market-price. A market seller had wanted to rise the price from ₹150 (half of then market-price) to ₹200. Das shot him in the chest twice with a revolver stating he was no one to control the market. He was listed 'missing' by police.

=== Mid 1990s–2003: Control over Konnagar and Rishra ===
==== Shyamal–Bagha conflict (war) ====
Das sold thousands of tons of illegal goods from factories, making him a millionaire. His next target was to make him the 'don' of Hooghly and Howrah. Das was opposed by a former member of his gang, Bagha. In the late nineties (1997 to 1999), gang wars commenced between the gang of Bagha and the gang of Das. Both sides fought for the entire control of Konnagar, resulting in numerous killings and deaths of gang members of both sides. Some of the murders would reach newspapers. Two members of Das were killed by Bagha's gang. Das entered the hideout and controlled territories of Bagha and killed four gang members and burnt down their houses. Bagha escaped. The police from then took multiple crucial measures like raids and car searches. Shyamal was nowhere to be found, and was one of the only ones in his gang to not be caught in the nineties, he ranked number one on police lists.

After his disappearance, even, for undercover officers, his related people were always ready to inform Das of the news and he would know about police in a small moment of time. The local vendors, sellers and businessmen began to keep surveillance on the police officers who patrolled the area (Konnagar-Rishra), using various codenames to refer to the ranks of the officers. Some cops alleged that Shyamal's members were present inside the police forces.

==== Out of Konnagar and Rishra ====
Das was known as the 'Robin Hood' of Konnagar and Rishra, as he supposedly helped poor and needy people and gave money to people when needed, this was a hoax, Das actually spent no money. By keeping this rumor running, Das made a name of himself and had engaged more people to inform him when something went wrong. Das handed monthly salaries to people who provided him information. There were also many people who worked as informing him without any money given. Das used them to spread the rumors about his donations and helpfulness. While in exile, Das never told anyone where he would, how much money he spent gambling and whether he was sober or not. He never told anyone his exact plans, for telling time (when he went), he gave a range of time and not the exact, or would not go or go another time sometimes. A man informed the local SPDO of Das's plans. Das went to his house and killed him in front of his mother. He later dismembered his body and threw it in front of the Rishra rail crossing.

By the time mobile phones were in circulation, Das used with critical measurements and caution. He had learned that police could find out the location of the user just by using their signal to connect to a mobile tower. Normally he kept 2 phones with himself and 4 others for his accomplices. He used each one for no more than 2 hours at a time. No one knew what phone he used, when it was last used and where he used it. He always kept in mind that maybe the police were listening to him and tracking him.

==== In real estate business ====
Having everything well set, Das then entered the real estate business and worked also as a land promoter. At that time, many buildings were being built in south Hooghly and vacant property was being sold fast. When both Das and Mahato decided about a plot of land, they thought of buying it, building an apartment on it, and selling it for a high price. In the first case, the landowner did not agree with the price Das had offered. Das pulled out a pistol and coerced him to give up the land. Das said that he could make huge profits from selling his apartment if it appeared in advertisements on newspapers. He subsequently started building on the land.

When someone wanted to build an apartment in his area, ₹50 to ₹70 per square foot would had to be commissioned to Das. (Note: Das only had regulations for apartments/ flats, not residential houses.) If someone didn't have the money to build an apartment, he would lend them money, with a three percent return per month, for one hundred months. The materials for building were supplied by associates of Das who specialized in the construction materials sector. He hired an engineer to measure land accurately, then providing funds and himself kept track of money. Once the money sources were properly set, Das bought luxury cars and rented many apartments in the capital Kolkata, temporarily, their location only known by his close people. In these flats, sometimes he would host parties with treats and alcohol. He started wearing high quality clothes, shoes, sunglasses, mainly White Kurtis and pajamas from the best cloth makers from Kolkata. He had two girls, one from his first wife Tapsi and one from his second wife Mitali. Das enrolled them in Abhijit English medium school in Kolkata.

A disagreement happened between Das and Mahato. Das said having enough money and control, the emphasis should have been on the crime syndicate. He had enough influence and did not want to get tangled in situations unless absolutely necessary. Besides, the police already had numerous charges filed in his name. By creating a 'Robin Hood' image, next he wanted to enroll his name in the municipal candidates list. Mahato said that the syndicate can remain as-is, Das would be keeping an eye on the gang, and also the business. The theft from factories and coercion of people and gang actions would had to be decided frequently. Otherwise the control of the gang and its areas and the real estate would lose its power and slip out of control. He opposed to Das joining politics. The local and Kolkata Police in the meantime had gained the help of Crime Investigation Department of India, forming a special branch to monitor and track Shyamal Das. Hubba Shyamal did not stop his custom of changing phones or its SIM cards.

==== Hooghly industrial belt massacre ====
Das conducted his operation for many years on the Hooghly industrial belt. Sisir Chakraborty, a Communist Party of India (Marxist) leader, issued orders to him and his gang. Chakraborty and Das were primary enemies of Manas Roy Chowdhury. Das set out to kill Roy Chowdhury and his gang. In the Hooghly industrial region, more than 50 gang members and criminals died in a gang war, with Das's gang believed to have slaughtered about 30 victims, bringing charges upon Das. Roy Chowdhury was assassinated in 2003. Shyamal Das, Benarasi Bapi and some other criminals killed him using a chopper in a market near Konnagar railway station.

=== 2003–2005: Kolkata ===
==== Dispute with promoter and going to Kolkata ====
Das tended to avoid conflict and wars after the 2003 Hooghly industrial belt massacre. In December 2005, a promoter did not agree with Shyamal to give away his land. This promoter was connected to higher authorities. He refused to give up his land, even when Das forced him to, and kept it free from having any projects built on it. Das went to the site manager of that land and shot him, then threatened to kill all of the promoter's family. The CID recorded a one-and-a-half-minute recording on a cell phone where Das informed his associate he was thinking of exploding the promoter's house. The CID and local police organized a meeting. The SP Hooghly were informed to always keep notice. The SP Howrah's force was sent to discover and inquire about the promoter's plot of land in undercover. The local police were to keep track and try to uncover any of possible Das's calls at any given time.

==== Hiding in Kolkata ====
On December 21, 2005, the Deputy inspector general of police (DIG) received a call from the branch that kept record of his calls. In the call, the officer repeated from the tapped call that Das was planning to go to Baguiati the next day in the second half of the day (12 p.m. to 12 am). The call was of someone named Tanmoy from Guptipara. The SP from Hooghly found that there was no one named Tanmoy in Guptipara, informing the DIG. Sources asserted that the location was presumably somewhere between Keshtopur and Baguiati; In the house of a promoter in that area Das in the previous year passed by that house frequently. The sources identified the house. In the next dawn, the source accompanied by a police group would go to see the apartment in undercover, and the location of the nearest tower of Das's calls would be monitored by the dedicated branch. This was called 'Operation Shyamal'.

Four police teams assembled in the dawn, one in Ultodanga, one in Keshtopur, one in Baguiati and one in the Netaji Subhas International Airport with two cars. About at 10:30 am, a call came from a promoter in Bali to one of his SIM cards. It was answered by one of his members. The tower was identified to be of Dunlop, Kolkata, and remained that until 2:30 pm. The changing areas indicated that phone was facing southwards. Another SIM of Das turned on, showed he was still in Dunlop. It was perceptible that Das was somewhere in Dunlop and the first SIM was of a member who was going south, or the opposite.

By 3:15 pm, the second phone had relocated to Dakhineshwar. A call was picked up on it whose voice was not of Das. He called the first phone, which was being used by Hubba Shyamal in Madhyamgram. The two cars from the airport went to the location. By 4:15 pm, the phone was shown to have entered the airport sector. It went towards Rajarhat, where the DIG's car was going.

==== First arrest and trial of Das ====
Das was heading towards Salt Lake (Bidhannagar). The phone location remained at Bidhannagar for three hours. He hung up any calls without listening. Himadri pointed out that he might be watching a film in the city center. The two police cars stopped at the city center. The film he was watching, Kalyug would end around 7:30. The officers were in their desired places. The film having ended, the audience exited and the officers began identifying their faces. An officer shouted 'Shyamalda'. Das, in the crowd looked back, and stopped along with his companion Benarasi Bapi. The DIG and Himadri pointed pistols at the two. The DIG informed the SP of North 24 Paragans of Das's arrest. His arrest was on television and newspapers by the next day.

The three were arrested by the CID in Salt Lake City Center-1. At the time Das had committed at least 26 murders and was charged by the CID for shooting a 24-year-old a few days ago. After this, police were sent to buildings affiliated with Das and his gang.

Before Das's was trialed in the Calcutta High Court, the police gathered some witnesses for his murder charges to go against Das. When the trial began, the witnesses turned against the state and denied any statements previously made by them. Thereby joining Hubba Shyamal's side. Das was arrested, but his gang at-large still persisted, and would not have taken their allegations kindly. The witnesses refused to identify the suspect (Das) in the test identification parade. Das having gained a lot of money from his business, spent on famous private lawyers. He was granted bail after being imprisoned for a bit more than a year by the Court of Calcutta which he paid and used to free himself. He returned to Hooghly after bailing.

=== 2005–2011: Return to Hooghly ===
When Das returned in Hooghly, he found the gang was under the leadership of Ramesh Mahato during his absence. Mahato had pulled a large number of members from Das's gang into his own crime syndicate group. Both the gangs were still working together. Mahato was no longer under the leadership of Das. During 2007 to 2010, Mahato and Das frequently engaged in disagreements and arguments. Das did not actively trust Mahato after his own gang formed.

==== Second arrest ====
Hubba Shyamal was again arrested on October 23, 2008, along with Laldeo Chowdhury near Makla railway crossing in Uttarpara city of Hooghly. More than 20 charges were made against Das in different police stations. He was again granted bail by the Calcutta High Court and released.

==== Nomination for municipal candidate and turning into politics ====
Das posted a nomination to become the councilor/leader in ward no. 2 of Rishra Municipality. For posting the nomination, he went to the Shrirampore administrative building with a motorcade of 50–60 cars backed up by a hundred motorcycles going along as a feat. Das repealed the nomination in 2011. The nomination was filed on April 29, 2009, from the Konnagar Municipality. Das arrived there with about his 150 supporters, wearing a white kurta and sunglasses.

==== Third arrest ====
Shyamal Das was arrested for a third time in front of a hotel near Grand Trunk Road in Jagannathpur of Dankuni on February 20, 2011. This time there were 52 charges against Das, with 26 of them being of murder. Upon being informed, officers from the Dankuni police station went to the specified location to apprehend Das. Das was caught in possession of a revolver and nine rounds of ammo. He arrived there by a vehicle. He was charged for grand theft auto (car theft) and for organizing a riot in a municipal building. Das was given bail and was released subsequently.

== Death ==
Das had gone with Mahato to his apartment in Rishra to settle a dispute on May 29, 2011. Mahato drove him to his apartment. Before stepping inside, Das asked his associates who were accompanying him to not go inside with him. Das said to him "(Ramesh) Will you kill me now that I am alone?," (Note: Translated into English from Bengali.) not seriously. Das saw his trusted associates were present in the room holding knives and pistols in their hands, among them was Nepu Giri. He was surrounded by them. Das was unable to reach for the 9mm pistol he had. Mahato said to him, "Look, Shyamal, it is no longer possible to work together. If we separate, then either you will kill me, or I will kill you." Mahato told Giri to kill him shortly before leaving the apartment.

Hubba Shyamal had gone missing since May 29, 2011. His family sensed a criminal gang abduction behind his missing status. His cellphone was also turned off. His brother and wife had filed a missing report to the Konnagar police on May 30. Police believed that Das and his gang were still active in the area. Serampore police was actively trying to track the status of Das. Das's wife had sent a letter about the missing gangster to the Chief Minister of West Bengal stating Ramesh Mahato had abducted him.

Das's body was found floating in the water of a canal in Baidyabati. His neck, stomach and face was found cut by knives. The police suspected Nepu Giri, his associate, to have killed Das, as it was his style. The police had also suspected Ramesh Mahato, who was said to have worked with Giri and was the last person Das had met. Police said that Das had left his house to meet with Mahato over settling a dispute. Police arrested the gangster Ramesh Mahato as behind the killing of Shyamal Das. Saying that he and his gang wanted to control the Hooghly and Howrah industrial belts and become a powerful entity coming from Shyamal Das. Some criminals claim that Nepu Giri had also been in the apartment of Mahato and had assassinated him.

Being found on June 2, 2011, the police took out his body from water and sent it for postmortem in the Srirampur Walsh Hospital in Serampore. Das's family members, who were staying in Konnagar at their house, were subsequently informed of the incident. They went to the hospital and identified the body to belong to 'Hubba' Shyamal Das.

== In popular culture ==
=== Book ===
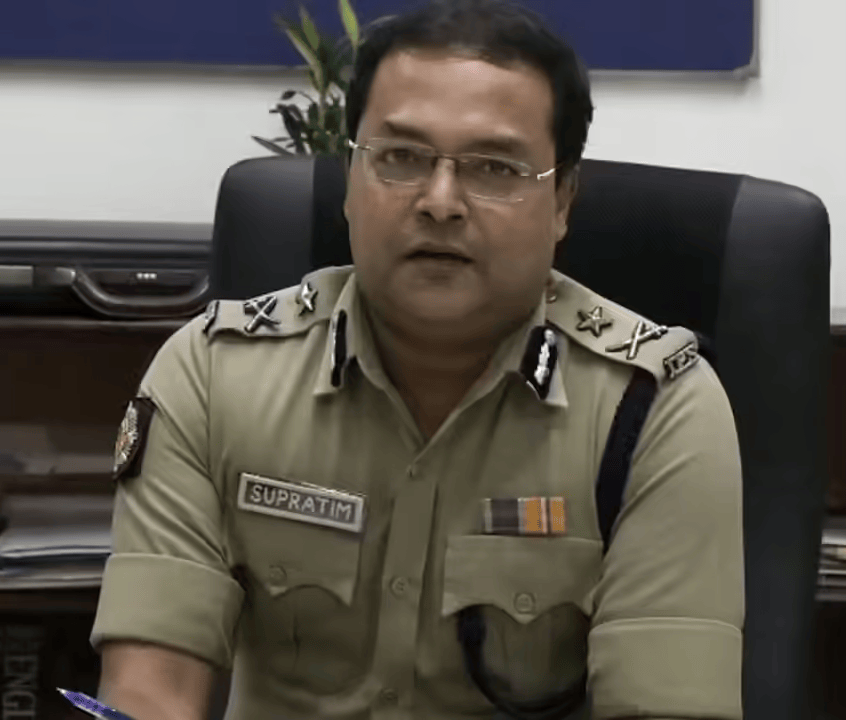
IPS Supratim Sarkar

Abar Goyendapith (2020): Written by Indian Police Service officer Supratim Sarkar. It is a book with the first biographical chapter being of Hubba Shyamal (page 1–26), written in accounts of police-provided sources and some given by Das's close associates or former members of Das's gang. Director Bratya Basu started the production of the film Hubba reading his life history in the book, featuring an adaptation. Sarkar gathered his arrest and major crimes details from the Criminal Investigation Department (CID) and the Deputy Inspector Generals (DIG) of various districts. Abar Goyendapith demonstrates his early life, rise, growth as a gangster in Hooghly and arrest in Salt Lake of Kolkata. Supratim Sarkar as of March 2024 was the Additional Director General of south Bengal. Hubba Shyamal's biography in the book chapter named 'Shyamalda, bhalo achen?' was one of the ten instances of criminal cases written by Sarkar. It is also known as Goyendapith Lalbazar. (Note: English title: "Again in the detective's lair" (Abar Goyendapith))

=== Film ===
Hubba (2024): Directed by Indian Bengali politician and actor Bratya Basu. It is a biographical film of Das. Hubba Shyamal was played by Bangladeshi actor Mosharraf Karim. It was produced by Firdausul Hasan. The film's shooting started in September 2022. Indraneil Sengupta served as the CID officer Dibakar Mitra. The film is partly political. Basu based Hubba's cast on the cast of his previous film Dictionary (2021). Basu described it as a blend of crime and comedy and exploration of politics and crime in Bengal. It was the second film directed by Basu that was produced by Hasan, after Dictionary. Hubba was produced by Friends Communication. The shooting ended in early November 2022. Mitra in the film acts by the law to stop Hubba Shyamal from performing heinous crimes which Shyamal does throughout the film. Basu said the film to have captured outdoor and indoor shots in a way that shows Bengali culture advance for 30–40 years. During production, Basu was concerned over any leaks. Central Board of Film Certification rated it 'A' (Adults Only) for its brutal and intense scenes. A 40-second teaser for the film was released on August 11, 2023. Basu approached another actor before picking Sengupta who was not ready to get clean shaven. He presented the film script to Karim, who agreed upon reading it. Hubba gives a brief show of Das's early life and rise, beginning majorly from the year 2005 with Sengupta attempting tracking Das, when Das's location in Kolkata was figured. Some scenes were a reference to gangster films Sarkar and Vaastav: The Reality. Benarasi Bapi is portrayed by Loknath Dey. Hubba Shyamal's name is changed into (Hubba) Bimal/Bimol. It is an adaptation of Abar Goyendapith by Supratim Sarkar.

=== Television ===
Hubba Shyamal is a flamboyant gangster who escaped justice despite his crimes – portraying him was both intriguing and intense. Through Ganoshotru, I aimed to bring authenticity and depth, as every episode is intricately woven to feel gripping and real.

— Rudranil Ghosh, talking about his role in Ganoshotru.

Ganoshotru (2025): Ganoshotru is a television series of five episodes portraying five different convicted criminals and murderers from West Bengal, each represented by a different actor and director. The fifth and last episode depicts Hubba Shyamal, portrayed by Rudranil Ghosh and directed by Srimanta Sengupta. Rudranil Ghosh tried in the series to bring authenticity and detail and depth into his role. The episode focuses on him killing a man and his mother using his style 'poite cut,' likely the man who informed the SPDO of Das's plans. Shifting to his arrest in Kolkata, his name being called by a police officer. The episode ends with his death in Mahato's apartment. The others portrayed in the series are Sajal Barui, Kamruzzaman Sarkar (Chainman), Troilokya Tarini and Rashid Khan (terrorist).

== Accomplices ==
=== Ratan Ray (1975–2012) ===
Ratan Ray lived near the Rishra police station and joined the gang of Shyamal Das when Das was operating in the Hooghly industrial belt region, becoming a major associate and aid of Das. Ray joined the gang as an ordinary member and slowly became close to Das, acting as a hitman and a known criminal employed by Shyamal Das. He made another new gang in Rishra, serving as an extension of Hubba's criminal organization. He executed rivals on the commands of Das, and those trying to sabotage him, including a party leader. Ray committed multiple murders, including the ones Das was convicted for. He was discovered dead submerged in a pond in Rishra. Police stating he was killed while drinking alcohol by his friends.

=== Ramesh Mahato ===
Ramesh Mahato was a former accomplice and partner in crime of Das. He joined Das's gang in around the mid to late 1980s when he collected iron scraps. He became partners with Ray from the time of him running the real estate business. Police said that while Ray wanted to leave his crimes and emerge as a businessman, Mahato wanted to remain in the crime network. Over the years, Mahato pulled some members from Hubba's gang into working for him, including Nepu Giri. Police suspected him of being linked to the killing of party leader Tapas Dutta. Mahato was arrested in 2016 for the murder of Surjit Gupta, living in Dankuni. His family said that he had purchased some land which Mahato's gang did not like, and on his way home in the evening, Gupta was killed by Mahato's gang. He was the right-hand man of Shyamal Das and took over his controlled areas after Das died. His influence consisted of Bally, Belur, Uttarpara, much of Hooghly, Howrah and Bardhaman district. He was charged with 20 counts of murder and 50 counts of extortion in the three districts. His trial happened in the Chinsurah Court and was denied getting parole or bail.
