= Lojja =

Indian Bengali drama series

- Release poster
- Genre: Social Drama
- Created by: Samragnee Bandyopadhyay
- Written by: Samragnee Bandyopadhyay
- Screenplay by: Samragnee Bandyopadhyay
- Directed by: Aditi Roy
- Starring: Priyanka Sarkar; Anujoy Chattopadhyay; Indrasish Roy; Saoli Chattopadhyay; Anindita Bose; Dipankar Dey
- Theme music composer: Subhadeep Guha
- Composer: Subhadeep Guha
- Country of origin: India
- Original language: Bengali
- No. of seasons: 2
- No. of episodes: 12

Production
- Cinematography: Alok Maity - Season 1; Ramyadip Saha - Season 2
- Editor: Subhajit Singha
- Production company: Shree Venkatesh Films

Original release
- Release: 2024 – present

Lojja (transl. Shame) is an Indian Bengali social drama web series directed by Aditi Roy and written by Samragnee Bandyopadhyay. Produced by Shree Venkatesh Films, the series deals with the themes of household verbal abuse, accompanying societal judgement and a woman's struggle to regain her lost dignity.

The series stars Priyanka Sarkar in the lead role while Anujoy Chattopadhyay, Saoli Chattopadhyay, Indrasish Roy, Anindita Bose and Dipankar Dey play other pivotal roles. Subhadeep Guha has composed the background score of the film. Two seasons of the series has been released till date and both of the seasons have aired on the Bengali OTT platform Hoichoi.

== Overview ==
Lojja focuses on how verbal abuse can have profound impact on an individual. While physical abuse is commonly fought against, many are not aware of verbal abuse and they are falling prey to them. Jaya, a victim of verbal abuse, slowly loses trust from her husband, in-laws, her only daughter and even her own mother and sister. She fights not only an abusive husband, but the whole society itself. Pushed to a limit after false allegations of her close friend's murder, she transforms from a timid and demure woman and decides to stand up for herself and regain her dignity.

== Cast ==
- Priyanka Sarkar as Jaya Sinha
- Anujoy Chattopadhyay as Partha Sinha, Jaya's husband
- Srija Halum as Jaya and Partha's only daughter
- Indrasish Roy as Shourjya Roy, Jaya's close friend
- Koneenica Banerjee as a psychologist
- Indrajit Mazumder as Jaya's elder brother
- Namita Chakraborty
- Sneha Chatterjee as Jaya's elder brother's wife
- Kheyali Dastidar
- Saoli Chattopadhyay as Mou Mitra, Jaya's colleague
- Anindita Bose as Sneha Roy, Shourjya's wife and Partha's lawyer (Season 2)
- Dipankar Dey as Amartya Sengupta, Jaya's lawyer (Season 2)

== Episodes ==
=== Overview ===
Series	Episodes	Originally released
1	6	22 March 2024
2	6	11 April 2025

=== Season 1 (2024) ===
No.	Title	Directed by	Written by	Original release date
1	"Grihoprobesh"	Aditi Roy	Samragnee Bandyopadhyay	March 22, 2024
2	"Kotha"	Aditi Roy	Samragnee Bandyopadhyay	March 22, 2024
3	"Ami Pagol Noi"	Aditi Roy	Samragnee Bandyopadhyay	March 22, 2024
4	"Khanchay Bondi"	Aditi Roy	Samragnee Bandyopadhyay	March 22, 2024
5	"Lojja Kore"	Aditi Roy	Samragnee Bandyopadhyay	March 22, 2024
6	"Atmasamman"	Aditi Roy	Samragnee Bandyopadhyay	March 22, 2024

=== Season 2 (2025) ===
No.	Title	Directed by	Written by	Original release date
1	"Doibo picnic"	Aditi Roy	Samragnee Bandyopadhyay	April 11, 2025
2	"Shorbonash-er ashay"	Aditi Roy	Samragnee Bandyopadhyay	April 11, 2025
3	"Nirjatoner lingo hoy na"	Aditi Roy	Samragnee Bandyopadhyay	April 11, 2025
4	"Ke apan ke por"	Aditi Roy	Samragnee Bandyopadhyay	April 11, 2025
5	"Lojja amar noy"	Aditi Roy	Samragnee Bandyopadhyay	April 11, 2025
6	"Nijer kachhe phera"	Aditi Roy	Samragnee Bandyopadhyay	April 11, 2025

== Production ==
=== Announcement ===
The second season was announced on 28 February 2025 along with 13 other web series in SVF's Golper Parbon 1432. On 25 March 2025, the first individual announcement for the series was done. On 26 March 2025, an announcement video was released. It revealed that Jaya will be fighting a more isolated battle in the second season, with no one by her side as she is falsely accused of the murder of her close friend, Shourjya.

=== Filming ===
The filming of the second season was started in January 2025 and completed by March 2025. The first season has been mostly shot in Kolkata. Major parts in the second season have also been shot in Kolkata with a few scenes being shot at Bolpur.

== Themes ==
- Verbal and psychological abuse

In our society, although physical domestic violence is spoken about, verbal abuse and its psychological effects are often not spoken about. The series shows how Partha constantly verbally abuses and demeans Jaya in front of the family, friends and even in the public places. Often common in our society, verbal abuse is looked over. But in the series, Partha crosses the thin line between a joke and verbal abuse as well as the boundaries of marital relationship. It shows the devastating effects of mental trauma and stress that verbal abuse can have on the victim.

- Societal judgement and stigma

In our society, women are often asked to adjust; not just by her in-laws, but also by a woman's own family members, even her mother. In the series, it is shown that how the society as well as her own mother asks Jaya to adjust, because after all her in-laws are open minded since they allow her to work even after marriage. It is told to her that, Partha is essentially a good human being from his heart, just a little ill-tempered and bad mouthed. Its good that at least, he is not physically abusing her. If a woman keeps contact with her male friend even after her marriage, her character and loyalty is questioned. The series shows how societal norms add up to increase the mental agony of a silent sufferer of verbal abuse, like Jaya.

== Marketing ==
=== Season 1 ===
The trailer of the first season of Lojja was released on 12 March 2024. It shows how a divorcee woman is questioned about her character and the adjustments which she is asked to make, despite constant psychological gaslighting and verbal abuse from her husband, who is apparently "short tempered, but good from heart" for the society.

=== Season 2 ===
The trailer for the second season of Lojja, titled as Lojja 2 was released on 2 April 2025. It displayed a transformation in Jaya's character - from a timid, introverted woman facing verbal domestic abuse in the first season to becoming a resilient fighter who has nothing to lose, after her friend Shourjya's death.

== Reception ==
=== Critical reception ===
==== Season 1 ====
Shamayita Chakraborty of OTTplay rated the series 3/5 stars and highlighted "Lojja is evidently, a part of Hoichoi’s social responsibility shows. While it has its usual problems, watch it for the heartbreak, empathy, and Priyanka and Anujoy’s performance." She praised it for highlighting the issues of verbal abuse, gaslighting, social conditioning, and Priyanka and Anujoy's acting. But criticized the rushed ending and the writing of the characters, for having almost no shades. She also bemoaned the show for following a typical Hoichoi Originals success formula, which created a lack of creative nuance.

Poorna Bnaerjee of The Times of India rated the series 3/5 stars and praised Priyanka Sarkar and Anujoy Chatterjee for their acting. But she bemoaned "The director makes it a bit too monotonous and predictable at the same time, by showing the constant abuse that Jaya goes through. The lack of character building beyond their apparent good/evil in virtually every character makes this drama extremely stereotypical and highly foreseeable. That takes away from the essence of suspense that holds the audiences’ attention through the six episodes."

Agnivo Niyogi of The Telegraph reviewed the series and wrote "Priyanka plays Jaya with a raw vulnerability and quiet strength that makes the character’s journey from a shy, submissive homemaker to one who stands up for herself quite convincing. Anujoy Chattopadhyay brings Partha to life with chilling authenticity but this spiteful, manipulative character devoid of any remorse feels quite black-and-white." He also criticised the series for its formulaic nature of storytelling storytelling.

Suparna Majumder of Sangbad Pratidin reviewed the series and highlighted "Can the piercing words that once escape from the mouth and wound the mind be forgotten? No." She praised the director and writer for bringing up the unspoken issue of verbal abuse in our society, Priyanka Sarkar's acting and the performance of the remaining cast but bemoaned the continuity issues between certain scenes.

Mohona Biswas of OneIndia rated the series 4/5 stars and opined "Priyanka's fluent performance as Jaya is bound to catch the attention of the audience. Anujoy's performance as Partha is also equally impressive. Director Aditi Roy has portrayed a strange reality in this character." She applauded the makers for addressing the grave issue of verbal abuse and insult through this series. Archi Sengupta of Leisure Byte reviewed the series and shared "The problem is the fact that the creators of this series made a series that is extremely in-your-face and works hard to make a spectacle of Jaya’s woes, so much so that it feels gimmicky. But, it leaves much to be desired, especially with a sad ending that doesn’t answer any questions that it starts off with."

==== Season 2 ====
Agnivo Niyogi of The Telegraph reviewed the series and noted "This is Priyanka Sarkar’s series and she owns the screen without once needing to raise her voice." He added "Verbal abuse — often dismissed as just words — is positioned here not as the prelude to violence, but as violence itself. The series makes space for the quieter cruelties that women endure — a backhanded compliment meant to wound." He applauded the way in which the series positions abuse not as a single act but as a systemic design but he bemoaned Chattopadhyay's portrayal of Partha, the excessive verbal signposting in the dialogues and the underexplored flashbacks.

Dolonchapa Dasgupta of Anandabazar Patrika rated the series 7/10 stars and wrote "As a series, Lojja is nothing special, but the scriptwriter and director deserve praise for their choice of the subject. Despite having plenty of loopholes, it speaks the story of victim women. It has been unnecessarily prolonged, which has weakened the script and thr series has lost its original purpose." She praised Dipankar Dey's performance and the outside courtroom scene at the end but bemoaned Priyanka's acting as monotonous and criticized the ending for not being practical.

Sandipta Bhanja of Sangbad Pratidin reviewed the series and praised Aditi Roy for her direction, Samragnee Mukhopadhyay for the writing, and Priyanka and Anujoy's acting skills. She also applauded the presence of Dipankar De, but bemoaned the over explanatory dialogues in certain scenes and the excessive use of the word "verbal abuse" in Anujoy's dialogues. Parama Dasgupta of Aajkal reviewed the series and praised the subject of the series, screenplay, dialogues and praised the director and writer duo for exposing the mental taboos deeply instilled in our society. She applauded the performance of the whole cast but criticized the loopholes in certain parts of the series and the hurried ending.

Shatakshi Ganguly of IWMBuzz rated the series 3/5 stars and wrote "Lajja 2 is a well-intentioned but undercooked dish. It has flavour, thanks mainly to Priyanka’s grounded performance and attempts a bold conversation. However, with characters that lack depth and a narrative that forgets to breathe, it remains a series that could have been so much more. It raises its voice, yes, but it doesn’t quite roar." She praised it for the unapologetic display of verbal abuse and its effects but bemoaned its character crafting.

== Remake ==
A report by OTTplay mentioned that Disney+ Hotstar is in talks with Hoichoi to purchase the Hindi remake rights of the film.
