= Kuheli (TV series) =

2026 Indian Bengali thriller series

- Release poster
- Written by: Koel Sreejib
- Screenplay by: Koel Sreejib
- Directed by: Aditi Roy
- Composer: Nabarun Bose
- Country of origin: India
- Original language: Bengali
- No. of seasons: 1
- No. of episodes: 7

Production
- Cinematography: Ramyadip Saha
- Editor: Subhahit Singha
- Camera setup: Single-camera
- Running time: 19—27 minutes
- Production company: Good Grip Films

Original release
- Release: 14 May 2026

Kuheli is a 2026 Indian Bengali crime thriller web series directed by Aditi Roy. Written by Koel Sreejib, it has been produced by Green Grip Films. The series stars Priyanka Sarkar, Susmita Dey, Ridhima Ghosh, Angana Roy and Kaushik Sen in the lead roles. The series is about a murder investigation of a police officer by her colleague. It marked the OTT debut of television actress Susmita Dey.

Principal photography took place in North Bengal in February 2024, with most scenes being filmed in around Darjeeling. Some of the scenes were shot in Sikkim and Kolkata. Nabarun Bose composed the music of the film. Ramyadip Saha did the cinematography while Subhajit Singha handled the editing. The series was streamed on the Bengali OTT platform Hoichoi on 15 May 2026.

== Overview ==
The series is set in the town of Kuheli and follows the investigation into the murder of police officer SP Rana Singha. DSP Agni Basu is assigned to investigate the case and finds that Rana was killed by someone known to him. The investigation brings suspicion on Rana's widowed wife Radhika and her two sisters, Debika and Ishika. As Agni looks into their relationships with Rana, details about their past connections to him are unveiled. The series follows the investigation as Agni tries to find out who was responsible for Rana's death.

== Cast ==
- Priyanka Sarkar as DSP Agni Basu
- Susmita Dey as Radhika Singha
- Ridhima Ghosh as Debika Dutta, Radhika's elder sister
- Angana Roy as Ishika Roy, Radhika's younger sister
- Kaushik Sen as SP Rana Singha, Radhika's husband
- Subhrajit Dutta as Sikander, Rana's drinking partner
- Durbar Sharma as Constable Harin Hati, Agni's assistant
- Anindya Chatterjee as Ishika's husband
- Indrajit Chakraborty as Debika's husband

== Episodes ==
No.	Title	Directed by	Written by	Original release date
1	"Kuheli tey Laash"	Aditi Roy	Koel Sreejib	May 14, 2026
2	"Swaran Sabha"	Aditi Roy	Koel Sreejib	May 14, 2026
3	"Bicycle Kick"	Aditi Roy	Koel Sreejib	May 14, 2026
4	"Charitraheen Meye Kukur"	Aditi Roy	Koel Sreejib	May 14, 2026
5	"Narkol Tel"	Aditi Roy	Koel Sreejib	May 14, 2026
6	"Purono Chhobi"	Aditi Roy	Koel Sreejib	May 14, 2026
7	"Happy Anniversary Rana"	Aditi Roy	Koel Sreejib	May 14, 2026

== Marketing ==
The teaser of Kuheli, titled as "Train to Kuheli", was released on 27 March 2026. It introduced all the lead characters in the series. The trailer was released on 30 April 2026. A second trailer was released on 11 May 2026.

== Reception ==
=== Critical reception ===
Parama Dasgupta of Aajkal reviewed the series and wrote "Kuheli is captivating among the five other well-known murder mysteries of Bengali OTT. In addition, in this series, directed by Aditi Roy, the mountain slopes and picture-like scenes captured in drone shots have provided excellent accompaniment." She praised the strong screenplay, lack of unnecessary dialogues and subplots, Aditi Roy's direction, the editing, the performance of the actors and the chemistry between the three sisters but bemoaned Angana's overacting in certain scenes, unnecessary rowdiness in Priyanka's character and the lack of proper backstories for the characters.

Swati Chatterjee Bhowmik of Sangbad Pratidin reviewed the series and opined "Kuheli maintains the thrill throughout. Every actor has adapted to his character wonderfully. Kaushik, Sushmita, Angana, Ridhima, Shubhrajit, Priyanka and Durbar have kept the audience hooked in the series with their impeccable performances. Nabarun Bose's background music is appropriate." She appreciated the performance of the actors, the cinematography, the editing, the background score and the usage of mist to add an element of mystery but bemoaned the presence of loopholes in the plotline, dented screenplay, rushed episodes and the unnecessary cliffhanger at the climax.
