= Angana Roy (Bengali actress) =

Indian TV actress (born 1998)

- Occupation: Actress
- Years active: 2018–present
- Known for: Alo, Tansener Tanpura, Paap

Angana Roy is an Indian actress who primarily works in the Bengali and Hindi film industry. In 2003, she made her Bengali debut with the film Alo. She has also played roles in Bengali web series such as Shei Je Holud Pakhi, Paap, Tansener Tanpura, and Mohomaya.

== Career ==
At the age of five, in 2003, Roy started her career with movie Alo, directed by Tarun Majumdar. After a long break, in 2018 she came back with the webseries Shei Je Holud Pakhi. After that she acted in a web series, Paap. In 2020, she played the character of Rohini in the webseries Tansener Tanpura. She is best known for her portrayal in the series. In 2022, she played the role of Rajlokkhi in the webseries Srikanto. She is going to be seen as a lead actress in the movie Lukochuri. Other than these, she has also acted in movies and webseries like Homecoming, Mrs. Undercover, Mohomaya and others. She has recently done a music video named Ga Chhunye Bolchhi with Anupam Roy.

== Filmography ==
=== Films ===
Year	Film	Director	Notes
2003	Alo	Tarun Majumder	
2019	Homecoming	Soumyajit Majumder	
2021	Lukochuri	Shieladitya Moulik	
2024	Pariah	Tathagata Mukherjee	
2026	Winkle Twinkle	Srijit Mukherji	
2027	Made in Kolkata	Mainak Bhaumik	
2027	Shekor	Bratya Basu	

=== Television ===
- Tumi Ashe Pashe Thakle as Parvati/Paro (2023–2024) (Star Jalsha) (replaced by Rooqma Ray)

=== Web series ===
Year	Series	OTT	Notes
2018	Shei Je Holud Pakhi	Hoichoi	
2019	Paap	Hoichoi	
2020	Tansener Tanpura	Hoichoi	
2021	Mohomaya	Hoichoi	
2022	Srikanto	Hoichoi	
2023	Indubala Bhaater Hotel	Hoichoi	
2026	Prem Shots	Hoichoi	
2026	Kuheli	Hoichoi	

=== Music video ===
Year	Title	Co-actor	Music by	Ref.
2022	Ga Chhunye Bolchhi	Rwitobroto Mukherjee	Anupam Roy	
