= Samik Roy Choudhury =

Indian Bengali filmmaker

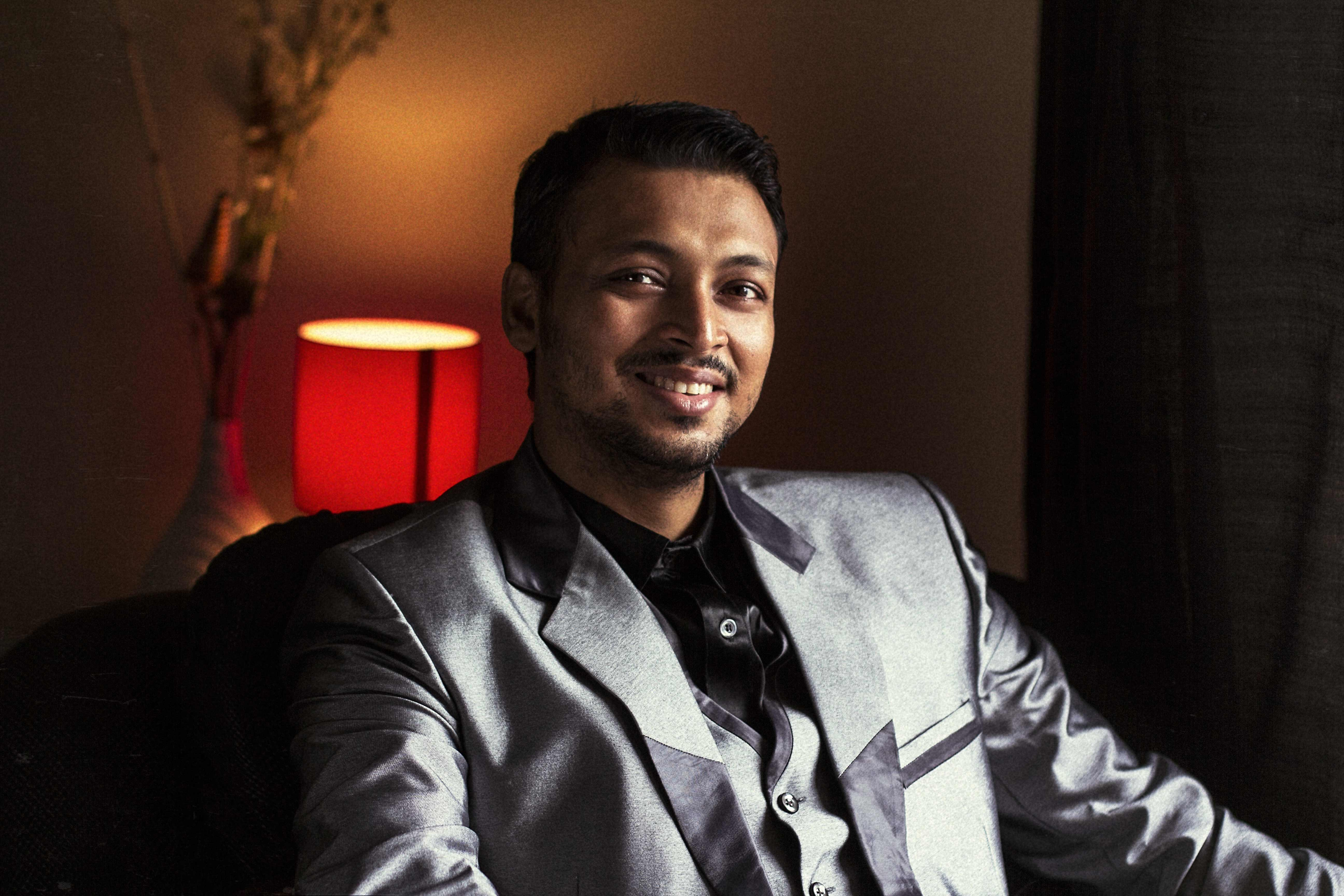
- Born: Samik Roy Choudhury; Kolkata
- Occupations: Film director, visual effects artist
- Known for: Filmmaking, VFX and Writing
- Notable work: Beline, Night at the Museum: Battle of the Smithsonian
- Awards: Filmfare East 2025 for Best Debut Director Best Director at Third Eye 21st Asian Film Festival 2025 Best Film Critic award at Anandalok Puraskar ABP 2025

Samik Roy Choudhury (Bengali: শমীক রায় চৌধুরী) is an Indian Bengali filmmaker.

== Introduction ==
Samik was born in the city of Calcutta into a Bengali middle-class family. Starting his career as a visual effects artist, he was drawn into independent filmmaking. He is known for his thought provoking film Beline(2024) which stirred not only the mind of the Bengali film audiences but eminent film makers too. All reviews were positive and the ratings were all in favour of the film. Among all his short Films Okiagari, Sex everywhere, Vanichi Vani and Yesterday was mostly celebrated. His debut feature film D Major (2016) was written, directed and produced by him. D Major was honored at FOG film festival '16, Kolkata International Film Festival 2016, Indian world Film Festival 2018. He worked on Night at the Museum: Battle of the Smithsonian (2009), The Mummy: Tomb of the Dragon Emperor (2008) and Alvin and the Chipmunks: Chipwrecked (2011) and on many others as a visual effects technical director. Choudhury also directed the music video like Daniken, Mukhosh, Stobdho Jibon, Janla, Sanghoti Jaanai and a few more, in which Daniken, Janla and Saghoti Jaanai featured the singer Rupam Islam. His work as a dialogue writer, VFX supervisor, lyricist and associate director on the same 2010 Manoj Michigan movie 89 proves his versatile talent. His film Okiagari, which stars Mir Afsar Ali premieres at 26th KIFF on January 15, 2021.

== Filmography ==
- Maya Satya Bhram (2026)
- Beline (2024)
- Okiagari (2021)
- Daniken [MV] (2017)
- D Major (2016)

== Shortfilm ==
- Yesterday (2016)
- Vanichi Vani (2013)
- Loner Lost (in)Sanity [Short] (2011)
- Blood Honour Bleeds [Short] (2011)
- For a Change [Short] (2011)
- The Mummy: Tomb of the Dragon Emperor [As Matchmove TD] (2008)
- Night at the Museum: Battle of the Smithsonian [As Matchmove TD] (2009)
- Cirque du Freak: The Vampire's Assistant [As Matchmove TD] (2009)
- Alvin and the Chipmunks: The Squeakquel [As Matchmove TD] (2009)
- Yogi Bear [As Matchmove TD] (2010)
- Alvin and the Chipmunks: Chipwrecked [As Lighting TD] (2011)
- 89 (As Dialogue writer and VFX supervisor) (2015)
- Ganoshotru
