= Partition of Bengal =

Partition of Bengal may refer to the partition of the Bengal region on two occasions:

- Partition of Bengal (1905), a reorganization within India
- Partition of Bengal (1947), a consequence of the Partition of India
